= French jazz =

Style of music

Jazz music has been popular in France since the 1920s. Its international popularity peaked in the 1930s, and it has been continually enjoyed since.

== History ==
Following World War I, a number of American expatriates settled in Paris and began to build up a jazz scene. France did not suffer from racial discrimination as much as the US, so a mixture of musical styles from different cultures began to emerge.

As with Brazil, the French were at first concerned it was too American of an influence before "making it their own". Although in the case of the French, the adjustment proved faster, as by the 1930s, jazz had become acceptable. Between the 1930s and 1950s, the biguine, a style of jazz from the French Caribbean was popular among dance orchestras. Lacking recognition at home, several biguine artists from Martinique moved to mainland France, where they achieved greater popularity in Paris, especially in the wake of the colonial exhibition in 1931. Early stars like Alexandre Stellio and Sam Castandet became popular in Paris. An important event in that it is the creation of the Quintette du Hot Club de France in 1934. This is among the most significant jazz groups in European history.

Starting in the late 1940s, the Le Caveau de la Huchette would become an important place for French and American jazz musicians. Many American jazz artists have lived in France from Sidney Bechet to Archie Shepp. For example, Sidney Bechet settled in France in 1949 and played with Claude Luter and André Réwéliotty. These Americans would have an influence on French jazz, but at the same time, French jazz had its own inspirations as well. For example, Bal-musette had some influence on France's form of Gypsy jazz. Similarly, the violin, and to an extent the guitar, were traditionally more popular in French jazz than American. Related to that, Jean-Luc Ponty and Stéphane Grappelli are among the most well-respected violinists in the history of jazz. That stated, the violin is also popular in Eastern European jazz.

== French jazz musicians ==
- Claude Bolling
- Stéphane Belmondo
- André Ceccarelli
- Dante Agostini
- Sophie Alour
- Franck Amsallem
- Josephine Baker
- Michel Benita
- Médéric Collignon
- Benoit Delbecq
- Christian Escoudé
- Laika Fatien
- Richard Galliano
- Guy Lafitte
- Jef Gilson
- Beb Guérin
- Christian Jacob
- Jean-Marc Jafet
- Jean-François Jenny-Clark
- Michel Graillier
- Biréli Lagrène
- Géraldine Laurent
- Nguyên Lê
- Boris Vian
- Claude Nougaro
- Michel Legrand
- Éric Le Lann
- Didier Lockwood
- Stéphane Grappelli
- Jean-François Jenny-Clark
- François Jeanneau
- Double Six
- Henri Texier
- Georges Arvanitas
- Bernard Lubat
- Laurent de Wilde
- Jacques Loussier
- Sylvain Luc
- Ibrahim Maalouf
- Pierre Michelot
- Laurent Cugny
- Alain Mion
- Xavier Desandre Navarre
- Émile Parisien
- Vincent Peirani
- Daniel Humair
- Erik Truffaz
- Stéphane Belmondo
- Guillaume Perret
- Dominique Pifarély
- Jean-Michel Pilc
- Jean-Luc Ponty
- Michel Portal
- Jo Privat
- Manu Katché
- Alain Jean-Marie
- Django Reinhardt
- Henri Renaud
- Louis Sclavis
- Bernard Peiffer
- André Hodeir
- Jacky Terrasson
- Henri Texier
- Scott Tixier
- Baptiste Trotignon
- Erik Truffaz
- René Urtreger
- Maurice Vander
- Christian Vander
- Barney Wilen
- Antoine Hervé
- Bojan Zulfikarpašić

== Jazz festivals in France ==
- Banlieues Bleues in Seine-Saint-Denis
- Blues Passions Cognac in Cognac
- Europa Jazz Festival in Le Mans
- Festival International Django Reinhardt in Samois sur Seine
- La Défense Jazz Festival in Paris
- Jazz à Porquerolles in Porquerolles
- Jazz à Sète in Sète
- Jazz à Toulon in Toulon
- Festival de jazz d'Orléans in Orléans
- Jazz à Juan in Antibes
- Jazz aux Remparts in Bayonne
- Jazz à Vienne in Vienne
- Jazz en tête in Clermont-Ferrand
- Jazz in Marciac in Marciac
- Jazz sous les pommiers in Coutances
- Jazz à Saint-Germain-des-Prés in Paris
- Swing in Deauville in Deauville
- Les Rendez-vous de l'Erdre along the Erdre river
- Jazz sur son 31 in Toulouse
- JVC Jazz Festival in Paris
- Festival de jazz de La Rochelle in La Rochelle
- La Villette Jazz Festival in Paris
- Les nuits du Jazz in Nantes
- Musiques Métisses in Angoulème
- Musiques de Jazz et d'ailleurs in Amiens
- Nancy Jazz Pulsations in Nancy
- Nice Jazz Festival in Nice
- Paris Jazz Festival in the Bois de Vincennes
- Reims Jazz Festival in Reims
- Sons d'hiver in Val-de-Marne
- Tourcoing Jazz Festival in Tourcoing
- Uzeste Musical in Uzeste

== Tribute ==
In 1970, Walt Disney Pictures paid humorous tribute to French jazz of the 1930s with its hit cartoon The Aristocats, who performed their standard song Everybody Wants to Be a Cat ("Tout le monde veut devenir un cat") during a jam session in Paris with a view of the Eiffel Tower.
