= Sylvain Beuf =

French jazz saxophonist, composer, and arranger

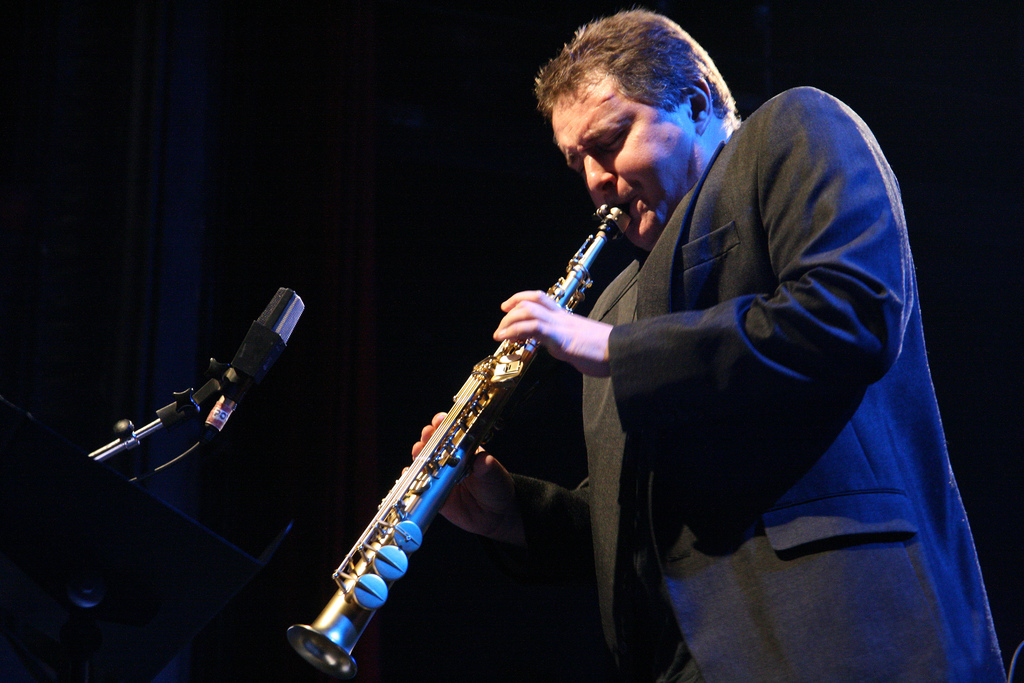
Sylvain Beuf

Sylvain Beuf (born April 6, 1964, Paris) is a French jazz saxophonist, composer, and arranger.

Beuf studied classical music in Orsay and jazz music at CIM with Jean-Claude Fohrenbach, Bernard Maury, and Claude Tissendier among others. He is a prolific composer and leads ensembles of several sizes which play regularly at international jazz festivals. In 1993, he won the Django Reinhardt award for French musician of the year. He is now the director of the jazz department at the conservatoire de Versailles.

Musicians he has worked with include Martial Solal, René Urtreger, Michel Legrand, Daniel Humair, Henri Texier, Richard Galliano, the collective Zhivaro, André Ceccarelli, Aldo Romano, Pierre de Bethmann, Michel Marre, Maurice Vander, Gérard Badini, the ensemble Océan, Moutin Réunion, Patrice Caratini, Andy Emler, Franck Amsallem, Ivan Paduart, Gordon Beck, Alain Jean-Marie, Bojan Z, Billy Hart, Jean-Michel Pilc, Emmanuel Bex, Sylvain Luc, Stéphane Huchard, Éric Le Lann, Baptiste Trotignon, Minino Garay, and Jean Pierre Como.

== Discography ==
- 1991 : Parcours, Quintet des frères Moutin (Blue Line) - with Louis and François Moutin, Marianne and Simon Spang-Hanssen.
- 1993 : Impro Primo (RDC Records) - Sylvain Beuf Quartet with Bojan Z, Christophe Wallemme and Stéphane Huchard
- 1999 : La danse des internotes (RDC Records) - Sylvain Beuf Quintet with Manuel Rocheman, Christophe François Verly and Jean-Pierre Arnaud
- 2001 : Soul Notes (Naïve) - Sylvain Beuf Quintet and Manuel Rocheman, Christophe Wallemme, François Verly and Laurent Robin
- 2001 : Sylvain Beuf Trio (Naïve) with Diégo Imbert and Franck Agulhon
- 2004 : Octovoice (Naïve) with E Bex, L Moutin, Th Peala, L Saltiel, L Littardi, V Puesh, B Jacquot.
- 2004 : Trio Expérience (RCD) with F Agulhon and D Imbert
- 2007 : Mondes parallèles with Franck Agulhon, Damien Argentieri, André Ceccarelli, Frédéric Delestré, Diego Imbert, Denis Leloup, Laura Littardi, Michel Perez, Jérôme Regard
- 2010 : Joy (Such Prod/Harmonia Mundi) with Franck Agulhon (d), Diego Imbert (b), Pierrick Pedron (as), Denis Leloup (tb) and Jean-Yves Jung (p), live at Jazz Club de Dunkerque.
- 2012 : Electric Excentric (Such Prod/Harmonia Mundi) with Manu Codjia, Philippe Bussonnet, Julien Charlet, Alex Tassel, Nicolas Folmer, Thomas Guei and Thomas Beuf
- 2015 : Plénitud (Impro Primo Records/Socadisc) with Manu Codjia, Philippe Bussonnet, Julien Charlet and Laurent Coulondre.
