= Bernard Lubat =

French jazz multi-instrumentalist

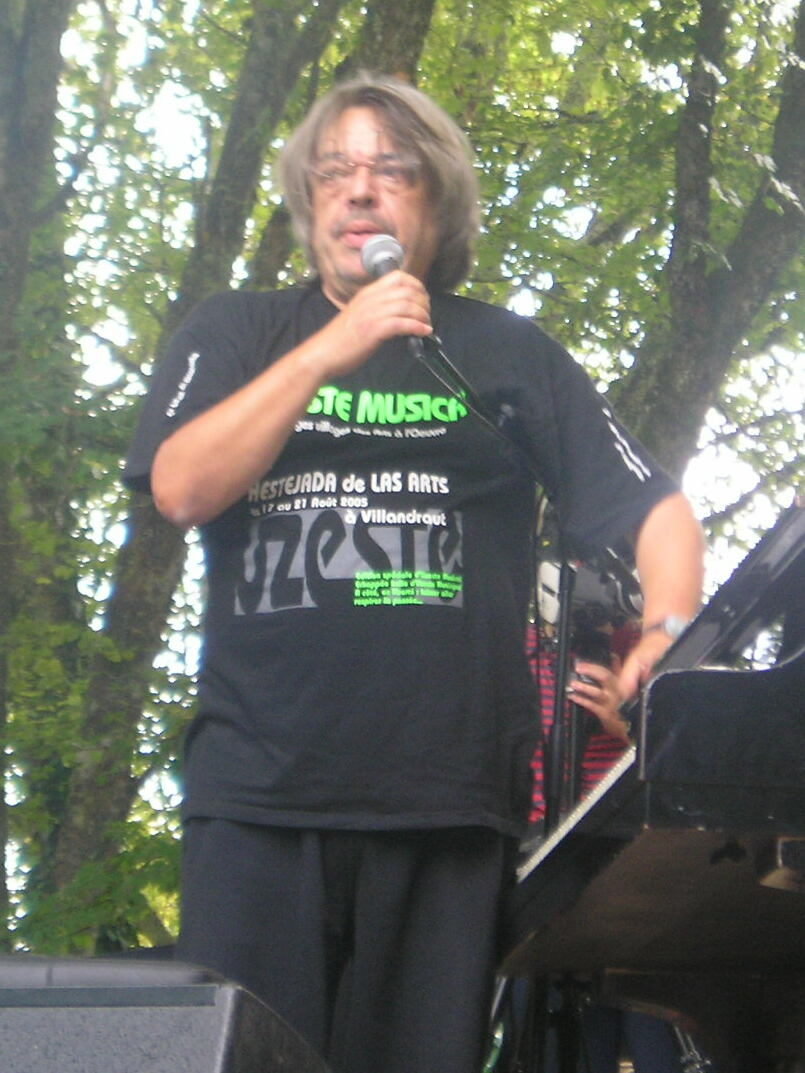
- Bernard Lubat in 2006

Background information
- Born: July 12, 1945 (age 80); Uzeste, France
- Genres: Jazz

Bernard Lubat (born July 12, 1945, Uzeste) is a French jazz drummer, pianist, singer, percussionist, vibraphonist, and accordionist.

== Early life and career ==
Lubat grew up in a musical family (his father played trumpet) and he received formal training at the Bordeaux Conservatory and the Paris Conservatory. He worked with Jef Gilson in 1964-1965 and was a vocalist with Les Double Six in 1965; later in the decade he drummed for the Paris Jazz All Stars, Roger Guerin, and the Swingle Singers. He also worked as a session musician, for Hubert Rostaing among others. He began a long-term association with Michel Portal in 1969 and played increasingly in avant-garde idioms, though he continued working in more traditional styles with Dexter Gordon, Stan Getz, and Eddy Louiss, among others. He was awarded the Prix Django Reinhardt in 1972.

During his life he played with a lot of artists, jazz giants and entertainer giants. He played notably with Dalida, Aznavour, Claude François, Yves Montand, Sacha Distel, and also Salif Keita, Manu Dibango, Max Roach, René Thomas, Alby Cullaz, Michel Graillier, Jean-Luc Ponty, Sylvain Luc, Mimi Perrin, Pierre Michelot, Martial Solal, Michel Portal, Jean-François Jenny-Clark, Roland Kirk, Dexter Gordon, Bud Powell, Archie Shepp, Kenny Clarke, Cecil Taylor, Nathan Davis, Stan Getz, Didier Lockwood, Stéphane Grappelli, Hermeto Pascoal, Richard Galliano, Claude Nougaro, Joao Gilberto, Paco Sery, Eddy Louiss, Vanina Michel, Yves Carbonne, Michel Macias, François Corneloup, Eric Le Lann, Jacques di Donato, Sigfried Kessler, Daniel Humair, Christophe Monniot, Francis Bourrec, Géraldine Laurent, Henri Texier, André Ceccarelli, Luther François, Maurice Vander, Louis Sclavis, Dominique Pifarély, Marc Perrone, René Urtreger, Dante Agostini, Mino Cinelu, Jacques Higelin, Han Bennink, Dizzy Gillespie, Beb Guérin, Sonny Stitt, La Velle, Jo Privat, Georges Moustaki, Jean-Marie Machado, Joëlle Léandre, Sam Rivers, Philippe Deschepper, Paco Charlery, Bernard Brancard, Jean-Michel Pilc, Misha Mengelberg, Pino Minafra, Jack Dejohnette, Coleman Hawkins, Wayne Dockery, Ben Webster, Michel Petrucciani, Modern Jazz Quartet, Don Cherry, Bernadette Lafont, etc...
