= Prix Django Reinhardt =

Annual award for French jazz musicians

The Prix Django Reinhardt is an award granted by the French Académie du Jazz to the best French jazz musician of the year. It is named after Django Reinhardt. The prize is determined by a jury of jazz journalists, producers, and musicians.

In 2006 the double CD 50 ans Prix Django Reinhardt (with booklet) was released for the prize's 50th anniversary.

== Winners ==
- 2024: Robinson Khoury
- 2023: Grégory Privat
- 2022: Leïla Olivesi
- 2021: Thomas de Pourquery
- 2020: Sophie Alour
- 2019: Hugo Lippi
- 2018: Baptiste Herbin
- 2017: Fred Nardin
- 2016: Paul Lay
- 2015: Airelle Besson
- 2012: Émile Parisien
- 2011: Nguyên Lê
- 2010: Sylvain Luc
- 2009: Stéphane Guillaume
- 2008: Médéric Collignon, Géraldine Laurent
- 2007: Pierre Christophe
- 2006: Pierrick Pedron
- 2005: François Moutin, Louis Moutin
- 2004: Pierre de Bethmann
- 2003: Jacky Terrasson
- 2002: Bojan Zulfikarpašić (Bojan Z)
- 2001: Baptiste Trotignon
- 2000: Jean-Michel Pilc
- 1999: Sophia Domancich
- 1998: Manuel Rocheman
- 1997: Daniel Huck
- 1996: Simon Goubert
- 1995: Emmanuel Bex
- 1994: Lionel Belmondo, Stéphane Belmondo
- 1993: Laurent de Wilde, Sylvain Beuf
- 1992: Richard Galliano
- 1991: Jean-Loup Longnon
- 1990: Hervé Sellin
- 1989: Laurent Cugny
- 1988: Louis Sclavis
- 1987: Marc Ducret
- 1986: Zool Fleischer
- 1985: Antoine Hervé
- 1984: Marc Bertaux
- 1983: Éric Le Lann
- 1982: Michel Petrucciani
- 1981: François Couturier
- 1980: François Jeanneau
- 1979: Alain Jean-Marie
- 1978: Michel Graillier
- 1977: Henri Texier
- 1976: Christian Escoudé
- 1975: Joseph Dejean
- 1974: Jean-François Jenny-Clark
- 1973: Alby Cullaz
- 1972: Bernard Lubat
- 1971: Ivan Jullien
- 1970: François Guin
- 1969: Michel Roques
- 1968: Michel Portal
- 1967: Jean-Luc Ponty
- 1966: Gilbert Rovère
- 1965: Jean-Louis Chautemps
- 1964: Eddy Louiss
- 1963: Pierre Michelot
- 1962: Maurice Vander
- 1961: René Urtreger
- 1960: Georges Arvanitas
- 1959: Roger Guérin
- 1958: Barney Wilen
- 1957: Christian Chevallier
- 1956: Martial Solal
- 1955: Guy Lafitte
