= Jean-Loup Longnon =

French jazz trumpeter and composer

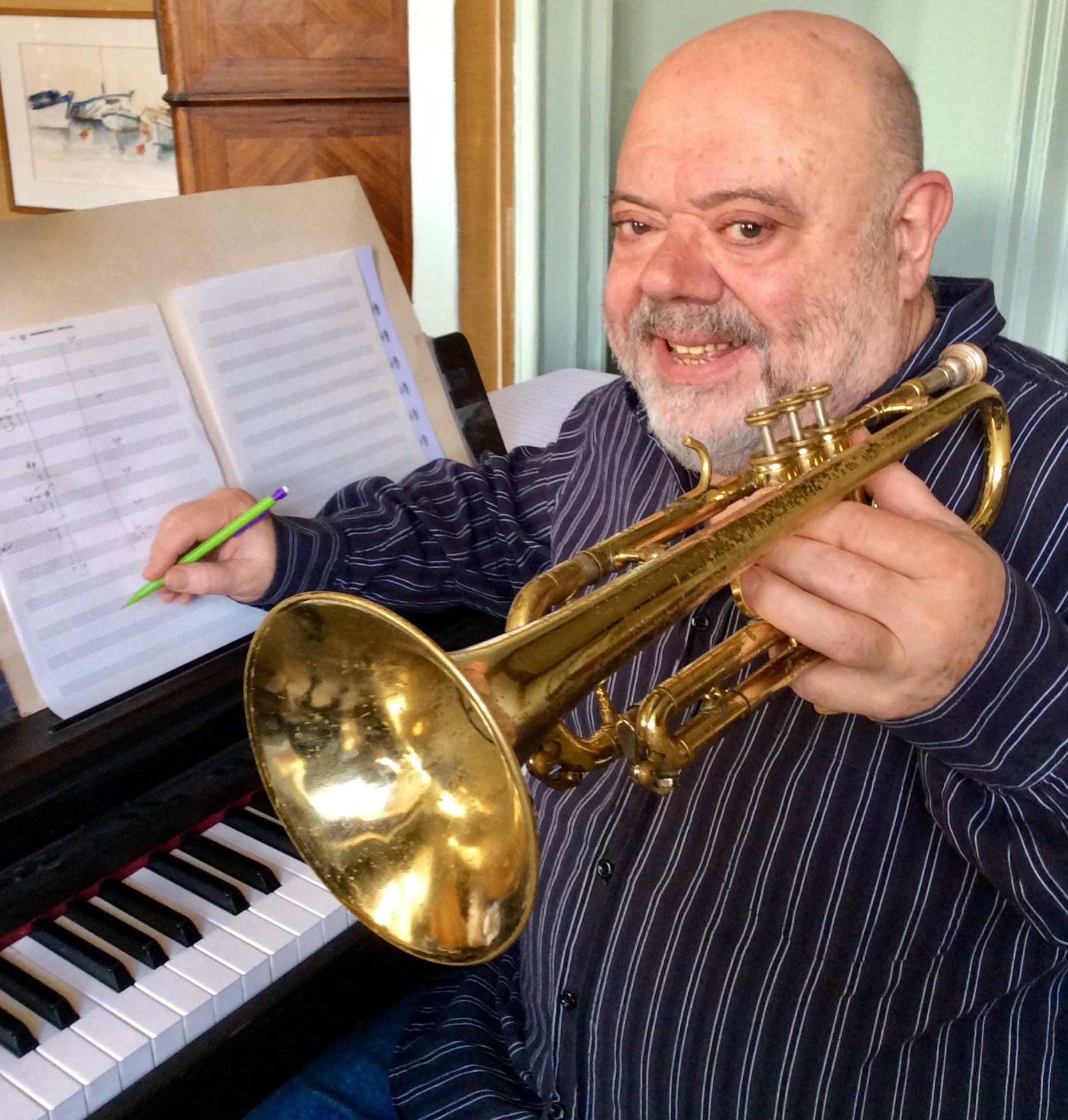

Jean-Loup Longnon (born February 2, 1953, Paris) is a French jazz trumpeter, composer, and arranger. He is the nephew of Guy Longnon.

Longnon comes from a family of writers and musicians and first studied piano and cello, but at the age of 15 he turned to jazz, where he learned to play by listening to recordings of musicians such as Dizzy Gillespie. Early in his career he played with groups such as the Jazzerinos and the Dixie Cats, and soon after with Milt Buckner, Chris Woods, Rhoda Scott, and Jef Gilson. He led a big band and played for years with his own small groups, and has worked with Roger Guerin, Eric Le Lann, Michel Legrand, Daniel Huck, Kenny Clarke, Martial Solal, Stéphane Grappelli, Michel Petrucciani, Eddy Louiss, Dizzy Gillespie, Wynton Marsalis, Randy Brecker, Clark Terry, and Stan Getz. In 1999 he released the live recording Bop Dreamer, recorded at the jazz festival in Marciac (Pygmalion Records, with his septet, with two trumpets and two tenor saxophones). Cyclades (JMS / Sony, 1992) was inspired by the Greek islands and involved more than 90 musicians. With the pianist Louis Mazetier, he recorded the album Just Friends, which explored bebop and stride piano.

As a composer, he is influenced by classical composers such as Claude Debussy, Maurice Ravel, Henri Dutilleux, Igor Stravinsky, Francis Poulenc, and Darius Milhaud, as well as Brazilian music.

Longnon won the Prix Django Reinhardt of the French Académie du Jazz (as well as their Boris Vian Prize) in 1991 and in 1995 the Django d'Or as the best French jazz musician.

== Discography ==
With Benny Golson

- Domingo (Dreyfus, 1992)
- “Encore du bop???” (JMS/Sony), a big-band album featuring his arrangement of Billy Strayhorn's Lush Life. (2012)
