= Banlieues Bleues Festival =

Jazz festival in Seine-Saint-Denis, France

Banlieues Bleues
- Genre: jazz et musique cousines (world music, electronic music)
- Dates: Last weekend of April and first weekend of May
- Locations: Seine-Saint-Denis, France
- Years active: 1984 – present
- Website: www.BanlieuesBleues.org

Banlieues Bleues Festival is a jazz music festival held in Seine-Saint-Denis. it was founded by Jacques Pornon, and the artistic director is Xavier Lemettre. Suburbs Blue is a jazz festival held every year in March / April in Seine-Saint-Denis, France . The concerts are spread across various locations in Seine-Saint-Denis. The festival is run by an association, funded by the department of Seine-Saint-Denis and the Regional Directorate of Cultural Affairs of Ile-de-France.

The programming is original, and leaves an important place in the creation, although it also hosts US headliners such as McCoy Tyner, and John Zorn in 2012, and Miles Davis in 1988.

== History ==
The festival banlieues Bleues was founded in 1984, changed its name first as jazz en Aulnoye and was then under the new name of several communes of the department aligned. So, among other things occurred Max Roach and Dizzy Gillespie as a duo in March 1989 at the Maison de la Culture de la Seine in Bobigny on. In 1990, Eddy Louis's a 70-member Multicolor Feeling Fanfare -Orchester together.

Since 2006 the festival venue in La Dynamo is in Pantin discharged for game forms of jazz and improvised music; more events in 15 municipalities of the department as Aubervilliers, Gonesse, Le Blanc-Mesnil, Saint-Ouen, Stains or Tremblay-en-France instead. Many live recordings of the festival appeared as DVD and audio. The long-time organizer Jacques Pornon was 2001, the line to Xavier LEMETTRE from.

Funding for the Festival of the General Council of Seine-Saint-Denis, the cantons, the Conseil régional of the region Île-de-France and the Ministry of Culture. banlieues Bleues, which has since become one of the largest music festivals in the Paris region, is 2012 with performances by artists such as McCoy Tyner, Joe Lovano, Nicole Mitchell, François Corneloup, Bruno Chevillon, Bernard Lubat, Marc Ribot, Romano / Sclavis / Texier, Bojan Z and Nguyên Lê instead. The Art Ensemble of Chicago celebrates be there 35th anniversary. Furthermore, the plays Orchestre National de Jazz under the direction of Claude Barthélemy.

Among the artists concerted in the banlieues Bleues Festival include Rabih Abou-Khalil, Akchoté Noël, Jean-Jacques Avenel, Han Bennink, Tim Berne, Peter Brötzmann, Avery Brooks, Taylor Ho Bynum, Jacques Coursil, Vincent Courtois, Benoît Delbecq, Dave Douglas, Paul Dunmall, Andy Emler, Roberto Fonseca, Bill Frisell, Fred Frith, Alfred Harth, Mary Halvorson, Yaron Herman, Susie Ibarra, Soweto Kinch, Stéphane Kochoyan, Peter Kowald, The Last Poets, Yusef Lateef, Jean-Marie Machado, Hugh Masekela, Christophe Marguet, Joe McPhee, David Murray, Michel Petrucciani, Michel Portal, Ernst Reijseger, Yves Robert, Archie Shepp, Esperanza Spalding, Cecil Taylor, Henry Threadgill, Claude Tchamitchian, Assif Tsahar, Robert Irving III Fred Van Hove, Vienna Art Orchestra and David S. Ware.
