= André Ceccarelli =

French jazz drummer (born 1946)

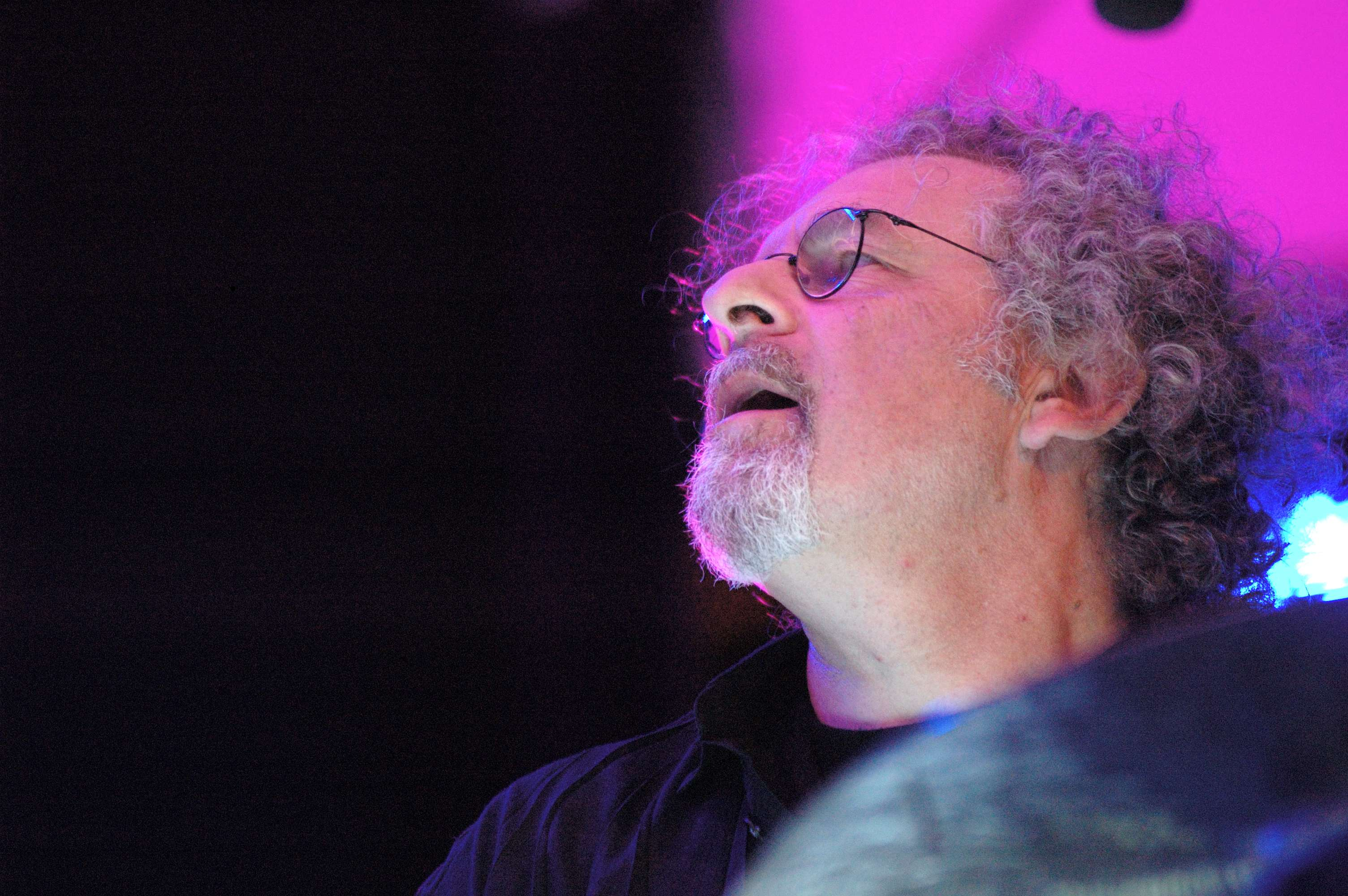
- André Ceccarelli, 2007

Background information
- Born: 5 January 1946 (age 80); Nice, France
- Genres: Jazz, rock
- Occupation: Musician
- Instrument: Drums
- Years active: 1962–present

André "Dédé" Ceccarelli (born 5 January 1946) is a French jazz drummer.

== Biography ==
After learning to play the drums from his father, Ceccarelli started out playing in the salons of the Hotel Royal Nice Promenade des Anglais at the age of fifteen, where he played with some musicians at tea dances on weekends. He was spotted by a lady who was the wife of John Tosan, and was presented to the brothers John Rob alias Jean-Claude and James Fawler alias Gerard Roboly, and on their request participated on rehearsals with the French band rock Les Chats Sauvages, who was looking for a new drummer, and was hired at age 16 in May 1962, which corresponds to the beginning of his long career.

After almost two years, several tours and many recordings with this band, he left in January 1964 to resume the position of drummer in the band the Casino Sporting Club Monaco, and playing with many entertainers in the studio and on tour, including Claude François, he turned to jazz. He had always wanted to be able to play with the jazz greats of the time, and could do so when becoming an active studio musician.

From the late 1960s, he collaborated with arranger and trumpeter Ivan Jullien, with whom he recorded the album including 'Synthesis' (1978). It also participates in the short-lived group Troc (1972) with Jannick Top and Alex Ligertwood and signs two fusion style albums, one on the label Bingow, recorded between 1972 and 1973, the other for the Carla label in 1977. In 1974, he played in the orchestra of Jean-Claude Naude and participated in the album A New Kind of Band.

In 1979, he began a career in the United States alongside Bunny Brunel and Chick Corea, and met Dee Dee Bridgewater in 1987, with whom he continued a long-lasting collaboration. He founded the 'Trio Sud' with Sylvain Luc and Jean-Marc Jafet in 2000.

He has been recorded as a leader since 1976, and released the album Avenue Des Diables Blues (2005) within his own trio.

Ceccarelli is the sponsor of the festival Jazz at Any Time that started in 1998 in Saint-Rémy-lès-Chevreuse and the Nice Jazz Festival in 2013.

He has worked with Aretha Franklin, Tina Turner, Dee Dee Bridgewater, Sting, Enrico Rava, Kenny Wheeler, Niels-Henning Ørsted Pedersen, Jean-Luc Ponty, Stéphane Grappelli, Didier Lockwood, Chick Corea, Joey DeFrancesco, John McLaughlin, Biréli Lagrène, Christian Escoudé, Philippe Catherine, Nguyên Lê and Sylvain Luc.

== Awards and honours ==
- 1998: Great Jazz Award, Sacem (French copyright management society), lifetime achievement

== Discography ==
=== As leader ===
- Ceccarelli/Chantereau/Padovan/Pezin: CCPP (Flamophone, 1975)
- Rythmes (Music de Wolfe, 1976)
- Ceccarelli (Carla, 1977)
- Andre Ceccarelli (JMS, 1981)
- Project One (Sonotec, 1985)
- Made in Sax (Patchwork, 1986)
- Rock (Patchwork, 1986)
- Africa (Patchwork, 1986)
- Masters with Rene Urtreger (Carlyne Music, 1987)
- New Music (MCT, 1988)
- Rock for Everytime (MCT, 1989)
- Dansez Sur Moi (Phonogram, 1990)
- Hat Snatcher (Phonogram, 1992)
- 3 Around the 4 (Verve, 1994)
- From the Heart (Verve, 1995)
- West Side Story (BMG, 1997)
- 61:32 (BMG, 1999)
- Carte Blanche (Dreyfus, 2004)
- Avenue Des Diables Blues (Dreyfus, 2005)
- Golden Land (CAM Jazz, 2007)
- Sweet People (CAM Jazz, 2009)
- Le Coq et La Pendule: Hommage a Claude Nougaro (Plus Loin Music, 2009)
- Ultimo (Universal, 2012)
- Twelve Years Ago (Bonsai Music, 2013)
- Inedits et Incontournables (Just Looking, 2013)
- Twenty 20 (Bonsai Music, 2014)

With Troc

- Troc (Cy 1973)
- Troc 2011 (Universal/EmArcy 2011)
- Crosstalk (Just Looking, 2015)

=== As sideman ===
With Dee Dee Bridgewater

- Keeping Tradition (Verve, 1993)
- Love and Peace: A Tribute to Horace Silver (Verve, 1995)
- Dear Ella (Verve, 1997)
- This Is New (Verve, 2002)

With Sacha Distel

- My Guitar and All That Jazz (Carrere, 1983)
- Dedicaces (Carrere, 1992)
- Jouent Ray Ventura (Carrere, 1993)

With Ivan Jullien

- Porgy and Bess (Riviera, 1971)
- Secret Service (Riviera, 1972)
- L'Orchestre (Bingow, 1983)
- Studio Davout (Continuo, 2018)
- Live At Nancy Jazz Pulsations (Mimetik, 2019)

With Bireli Lagrene

- Standards (Blue Note, 1992)
- Live in Marciac (Dreyfus, 1994)
- Blue Eyes (Dreyfus, 1998)
- Just the Way You Are (Dreyfus, 2007)

With Francis Lai

- Baby Sitter (Digitmovies, 2010)
- Salaud, On T'Aime (Absilone, 2014)
- Un + Une (Absilone, 2015)

With Didier Lockwood

- 1.2.3.4 (JMS, 1987)
- For Stephane (Ames, 2008)
- Open Doors (Ames/Okey/Sony, 2017)

With Eddy Mitchell

- Live Au Palais Des Sports 1977 (Barclay, 1978)
- Paris (RCA, 1986)
- Sur La Route de Memphis (PolyGram, 2015)

With Janko Nilovic

- Giant (Z International 1972)
- Un Homme Dans L'Univers (Montparnasse, 1978)
- Jazz Impressions 1 (Montparnasse, 2000)
- Jazz Impressions 2 (Montparnasse, 2000)

With Enrico Pieranunzi

- Seaward (Soul Note, 1996)
- Live in Paris (Challenge, 2005)
- Tales from the Unexpected (Intuition, 2015)
- Menage a Trois (Bonsai Music, 2016)
- European Trio (Casa Del Jazz, 2016)
- Monsieur Claude (Bonsai Music, 2018)

With Henri Salvador

- Henri (EMI, 1985)
- En Public (Disc'Az, 1982)
- Des Gouts et Des Couleurs (EMI, 1989)

With Yves Simon

- Vol. 1 Au Pays Des Merveilles de Juliet (RCA Victor, 1973)
- Respirer, Chanter (RCA Victor, 1974)
- Un Autre Desir (RCA Victor, 1977)
- Intempestives (Barclay, 1999)

With others

- Sophie Alour, Time for Love (Music from Source 2017)
- Georges Arvanitas, Pianos Puzzle (Saravah, 1970)
- Natacha Atlas, Myriad Road (Decca/Mi'ster 2015)
- Brian Auger, Live Oblivion Vol. 2 (Disconforme 1998)
- Charles Aznavour, Jazznavour (EMI, 1998)
- Stefano di Battista, Jazzitaliano Live 2006 (Casa Del Jazz, 2006)
- Gilbert Becaud, Becaud (Pathe, 1978)
- Pierre Bensusan, Wu Wei (Rounder 1994)
- Claude Bolling, Paris Lounge Toot Suite (Musicware, 2007)
- Flavio Boltro, Joyful (Bonsai Music, 2012)
- Bunny Brunel, Touch (Warner Bros., 1979)
- Bunny Brunel, Cafe Au Lait (Brunel Music, 2004)
- Philip Catherine, Babel (Elektra, 1980)
- David Christie, Love Is The Most Important Thing (Jupiter 1977)
- Alec R. Costandinos, Winds of Change (Casablanca, 1979)
- Nicole Croisille, C'Est Ma Vie Panda (DP 1978)
- Nicole Croisille, Jazzille (CY 1987)
- Natalie Dessay, Nougaro: Sur L'Ecran Noir De Mes Nuits Blanches (Sony Classical 2019)
- Yves Duteil, Sans Attendre (Inca, 2001)
- Jacques Dutronc, Dutronc Au Casino (Columbia, 1992)
- Jacques Dutronc, Breves Rencontres (Columbia, 1995)
- Christine Delaroche, Au Feminin (Eurodisc, 1978)
- Kellylee Evans, Nina (Plus Loin Music, 2010)
- Antonio Farao, Woman's Perfume (CAM Jazz, 2008)
- Antonio Farao, ASTA Passers of Time (Bonsai Music, 2019)
- Raphael Fays, Gipsy New Horizon (Sonopresse, 1979)
- Liane Foly, Les Petites Notes (Virgin, 1993)
- Liane Foly, Sweet Mystery (Virgin, 1993)
- Aretha Franklin, What You See Is What You Sweat (Arista, 1991)
- Michel Fugain, Capharnaum (Able, 1982)
- France Gall, Dancing Disco (Atlantic, 1977)
- Richard Galliano, French Touch (Dreyfus, 1998)
- Richard Galliano, New Jazz Musette (Ponderosa, 2016)
- Gipsy Kings, Somos Gitanos (Columbia, 2001)
- Stephane Grappelli, + Cordes (Festival 1978)
- Stephane Grappelli, Legrand Grappelli (Verve, 1992)
- Jimmy Gourley, Jimmy Gourley and the Paris Heavyweights (52e Rue Est, 1984)
- Johnny Hallyday, Je T'aime, Je T'aime, Je T'aime (Philips, 1974)
- Francoise Hardy, Parentheses (Virgin, 2006)
- Tom Harrell, Sail Away (Musidisc, 1991)
- Antoine Herve, Tutti (Flat & Sharp 1985)
- Francois Jeanneau, Ephemere (Owl, 1977)
- Francois Jeanneau, Terrains Vagues (Owl, 1983)
- Michel Jonasz, La Nouvelle Vie (Atlantic, 1981)
- Michel Jonasz, Michel Jonasz (Atlantic, 1981)
- Patricia Kaas, Scène de vie (CBS, 1990)
- Bernard Lavilliers, Les Barbares (Barclay, 1976)
- Bernard Lavilliers, Voleur de Feu (Barclay, 1986)
- Sara Lazarus, It's All Right with Me (Dreyfus, 2006)
- Maxime Le Forestier, No. 5 (Polydor, 1978)
- Michel Legrand, Parisian Blue (Alfa, 1998)
- Michel Legrand, Legrand Nougaro (Capitol/Blue Note, 2005)
- Eric Le Lann, Night Bird (JMS, 1983)
- Eric Le Lann, Joue Piaf Trenet (Musidisc, 1990)
- David Linx, Rock My Boat (Naive, 2011)
- David Linx, 7000 Miles (Sound Surveyor Music, 2017)
- Sylvain Luc, Trio Sud (Dreyfus, 2002)
- Sylvain Luc, Organic (Dreyfus, 2011)
- Tania Maria, Live (Medley 1979)
- Christian Morin, Christian Morin (Disc'Az, 1982)
- Nana Mouskouri, Hollywood Chansons de Mes Films Preferes (Philips, 1993)
- Milton Nascimento, Belmondo & Milton Nascimento (B.Flat 2008)
- Claude Nougaro, Ami Chemin (Barclay, 1983)
- Claude Nougaro, La Note Bleue (Blue Note, 2004)
- Shahin Novrasli, Emanation (Jazz Village 2017)
- Olivier Ker Ourio, Magic Tree (Plus Loin Music, 2010)
- Jean Claude Petit, The Best of All Possible Worlds (WEA, 1980)
- Jean-Luc Ponty, Ponty/Grappelli (America, 1973)
- Michel Portal, Turbulence (Harmonia Mundi, 1987)
- Baden Powell, Notes over Poetry (Far Out, 2017)
- Aldo Romano, Chante (Dreyfus, 2005)
- Charlotte Rampling, Comme une Femme (Inca, 2002)
- Francois Rabbath, Au Palais Des Sports Moshe (Naim, 1971)
- Francois Rabbath, Live Around the World (Red Mark, 1992)
- Enrico Rava, Tribute to Mingus (Adda, 1992)
- Demis Roussos, Souvenirs (Philips, 1975)
- Kayna Samet, Entre Deux Je Voix Publik, (Barclay/Universal 2005)
- Dany Saval, Penelope Conte Musical (Trema, 1978)
- Gilbert Sigrist, Numero 1 (Celluloid, 1989)
- Martial Solal, Martial Solal Big Band (Gaumont, 1981)
- Martial Solal, Big Band (Cy, 1984)
- Toots Thielemans, Chez Toots (Private Music 1998)
- Tina Turner, Love Explosion (United Artists, 1979)
- Kenny Wheeler, California Daydream (Musidisc, 1992)

== Bibliography ==
- Jean Chalvidant et Hervé Mouvet, La Belle Histoire des groupes de rock français des années 60, Paris, Éditions Fernand Lanore, 2001, 191 p. In French (ISBN 978-2-8515-7219-6)
- Music Story 2013 article Loïc Picaud. In French
