= Richard Galliano =

French accordionist of Italian heritage (born 1950)

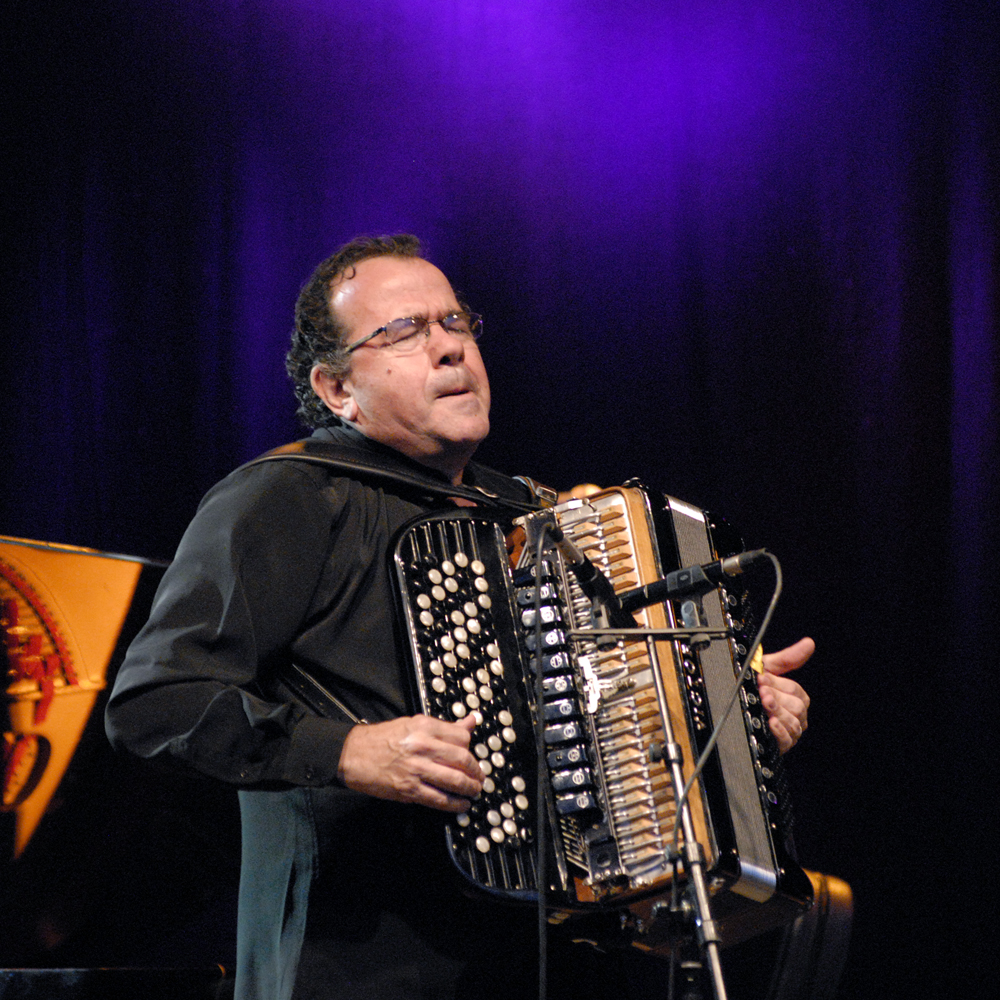
- Galliano performing in Stockholm, July 2009

Background information
- Born: 12 December 1950 (age 75); Cannes, Alpes-Maritimes, France
- Genres: Jazz, tango, Classical
- Occupation: Musician
- Instrument: Accordion
- Years active: 1964–present
- Labels: Deutsche Grammophon, Resonance, Dreyfus, CAM Jazz, Milan
- Website: Official site

Richard Galliano (born 12 December 1950 in Cannes, Alpes-Maritimes) is a French accordionist of Italian heritage.

== Life and career ==
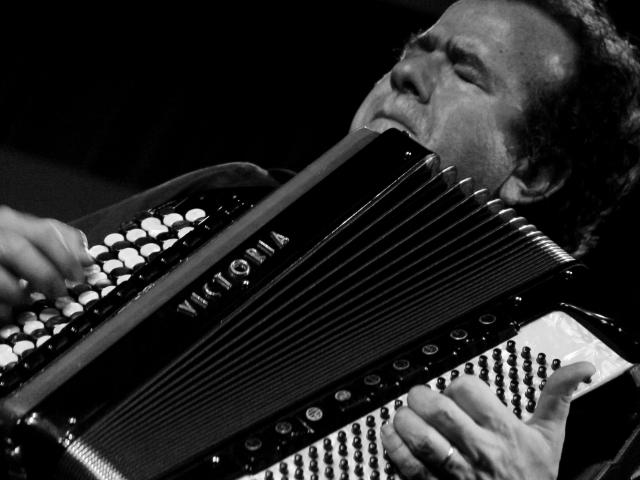
Photo by Andrea Colombara

He was drawn to music at an early age, starting with the accordion at 4, influenced by his father Luciano, an accordionist originally from Italy, living in Nice.

After a long and intense period of study (he took up lessons on the trombone, harmony, and counterpoint at the Academy of Music in Nice), at 14, in a search to expand his ideas on the accordion, he began listening to jazz and heard records by the trumpet player Clifford Brown. "I copied all the choruses of Clifford Brown, impressed by his tone and his drive, his way of phrasing over the thunderous playing of Max Roach". Fascinated by this new world, Richard was amazed that the accordion had never been part of this musical adventure. In this period, Galliano won twice the first prize in the "world accordion cap competition" which took place in Spain (1966) and France (1967). In the Spanish competition, the participants' duty work was "Chaconne" by the Israeli accordionist Yehuda Oppenheimer. Galliano and Oppenheimer kept up their musical collaboration and personal friendship until Oppenheimer's death in 2012.

Some later collaborations include Astor Piazolla, George Mraz, Brigitte Fontaine, Al Foster, Juliette Gréco, Charles Aznavour, Ron Carter, Chet Baker, Enrico Rava, Stefano Bollani, Martial Solal, Miroslav Vitouš, Trilok Gurtu, Jan Garbarek, Paolo Fresu, Michel Petrucciani, Michel Portal, Eddy Louiss, Biréli Lagrène, Sylvain Luc, Renaud Garcia-Fons, Ivan Paduart, Anouar Brahem, Wynton Marsalis, and Toots Thielemans. He was a key member of Claude Nougaro's band for several years as a pianist and accordionist.

== Awards and honors ==
- 1993: Prix Django Reinhardt from the Académie du Jazz
- 121022 Galliano, asteroid.

== Discography ==
=== As leader ===
- Spleen (CY, 1985)
- Panamanhattan with Ron Carter (Dreyfus, 1991)
- Flyin the Coop with Jimmy Gourley (52 Rue Est, 1991)
- New Musette (Label Bleu, 1991)
- Ballet Tango with Astor Piazzolla (Milan, 1992)
- Leprest-Galliano Voce a Mano (Saravah, 1992)
- Solo in Finland (Siesta Solo, 1992)
- Blues Sur Seine (La Lichere, 1992)
- Coloriage (Egea, 1992)
- Viaggio (Dreyfus, 1993)
- Laurita (Dreyfus, 1995)
- New York Tango (Dreyfus, 1996)
- Blow Up (Dreyfus, 1997)
- French Touch (Dreyfus, 1998)
- Concerts Inedits (Dreyfus, 1999)
- Passatori (Dreyfus, 1999)
- Face to Face with Eddy Louiss (Dreyfus, 2001)
- Piazzolla Forever (Dreyfus, 2003)
- Ruby My Dear (Dreyfus, 2005)
- Luz Nega (Milan, 2006)
- Solo (Dreyfus, 2007)
- If You Love Me (CAM Jazz, 2007)
- Live in Marciac 2006 (Milan, 2007)
- Love Day: Los Angeles Sessions (Milan, 2008)
- Ten Years Ago (Milan, 2008)
- Paris Concert (CAM Jazz, 2009)
- Bach (Deutsche Grammophon, 2010)
- Nino Rota (DeutscheGrammophon, 2011)
- Tango Live Forever (Milan, 2012)
- Vivaldi (Deutsche Grammophon, 2013)
- Sentimentale (Resonance, 2014)
- Tangaria (Milan, 2014)
- Au Bresil (Milan, 2014)
- La Vie en Rose (Milan, 2015)
- New Jazz Musette (Ponderosa, 2016)
- Mozart (Universal, 2016)
- Aria (Jade/Universal, 2017)
- An Evening with Ron Carter, Richard Galliano (In+Out, 2017)

=== As sideman ===
With Andre Ceccarelli

- Andre Ceccarelli (JMS, 1981)
- Carte Blanche (Dreyfus, 2004)
- West Side Story (BMG, 1997)

With Paolo Fresu

- Mare Nostrum (ACT, 2007)
- Mare Nostrum II (ACT, 2016)
- Mare Nostrum III (ACT, 2019)

With Claude Nougaro

- Plume D'Ange (Barclay, 1977)
- Nougaro 77 Enregistrement Public (Barclay, 1977)
- Nougaro 79 Enregistrement Public (Barclay, 1979)
- Assez! (Barclay, 1980)
- Chansons Nettes (Barclay, 1981)
- Au New Morning (Barclay, 1982)
- Ami Chemin (Barclay, 1983)

With Michel Portal

- Turbulence (Harmonia Mundi, 1987)
- Musiques De Cinemas (Label Bleu, 1995)
- Concerts (Dreyfus, 2004)

With Enrico Rava

- Rava L'Opera Va (Label Bleu, 1993)
- Italian Ballads (Venus, 1996)
- Chanson (Platinum, 2002)

With others

- Graeme Allwright, Sings Brassens (Philips, 1985)
- Dick Annegarn, Freres? (Socadisc 1986)
- Dick Annegarn, Chansons Fleuves (Nocturne, 1990)
- Eduard Artemyev, Urga (Philips, 1991)
- Avi Avital, Between Worlds (Deutsche Grammophon, 2014)
- Charles Aznavour, Jazznavour (EMI, 1998)
- Pierre Bachelet, Pierre Bachelet (AVREP, 1992)
- Claudio Baglioni, Oltre (CBS, 1990)
- Chet Baker, Salsamba (Musica 1981)
- Gerard Berliner, Le Vertige Des Fleurs (Flarenasch, 1992)
- Anouar Brahem, Khomsa (ECM, 1995)
- Angelo Branduardi, Il Ladro (Polydor, 1990)
- Francis Cabrel, Sarbacane (CBS, 1989)
- Adriano Celentano, C'e Sempre Un Motivo Clan (Celentano/Universal, 2012)
- Diego el Cigala, Dos Lagrimas (Edge Music, 2009)
- Michel Delpech, Les Voix du Bresil (Guy Cloutier, 1991)
- Kurt Elling, Passion World (Concord Jazz, 2015)
- Thomas Fersen, Le Jour du Poisson (Tot Ou Tard 1997)
- Liane Foly, Les Petites Notes (Virgin, 1993)
- Liane Foly, Sweet Mystery (Virgin, 1993)
- Brigitte Fontaine, L'un N'empeche Pas L'autre (Polydor, 2011)
- Michael Gibbs, Europeana Jazzphony No. 1 (ACT, 1995)
- Marla Glen, This Is Marla Glen (Vogue, 1993)
- Jean Guidoni, Vertigo Paradoxe (Polygram, 1995)
- Francois Jeanneau, Terrains Vagues (Owl, 1983)
- Michel Jonasz, La Nouvelle Vie (Atlantic, 1981)
- Manu Katche, It's About Time (BMG/Ariola, 1991)
- Joachim Kuhn, Birthday Edition (ACT, 2014)
- Maxime Le Forestier, Passer Ma Route (Polydor, 1995)
- Thierry Le Luron, Chante Thierry Feeries Les Chansons du Palais Des Congres (Disc'Az, 1980)
- Bireli Lagrene, Gipsy Project (Dreyfus, 2001)
- Nils Landgren, The Moon, The Stars and You (ACT, 2011)
- Bernard Lavilliers, Les Barbares (Barclay, 1976)
- Eddy Louiss, Multicolor Feeling Fanfare (Nocturne, 1989)
- Malicorne, Balancoire en Feu (Elektra, 1981)
- Wynton Marsalis, From Billie Holiday to Edith Piaf Live in Marciac (Harmonia Mundi, 2010)
- Gabriele Mirabassi, Cambaluc (Egea, 1997)
- Les Rita Mitsouko, Systeme D (Delabel, 1993)
- Les Rita Mitsouko, L'integrale (Because Music, 2019)
- Moustaki, Moustaki (Blue Silver, 1986)
- Clarence Penn, Saomaye (Verve 2002)
- Astor Piazzolla, Famille d'artistes (BMG/Milan, 1989)
- Julie Pietri, Le Premier Jour (CBS, 1987)
- Steve Potts, Pearl (CC, 1990)
- Dominique Probst, Riches, Belles, Etc (Pink Sky, 1998)
- Louis Sclavis, Danses et Autres Scenes (Label Bleu, 1997)
- Francesca Solleville, Chants D'Exil et De Lutte (Le Chant du Monde, 1975)
- Maurice Vander, L'Amour Trop Fort (Perspective, 1980)
