= Baptiste Trotignon =

French jazz pianist and composer

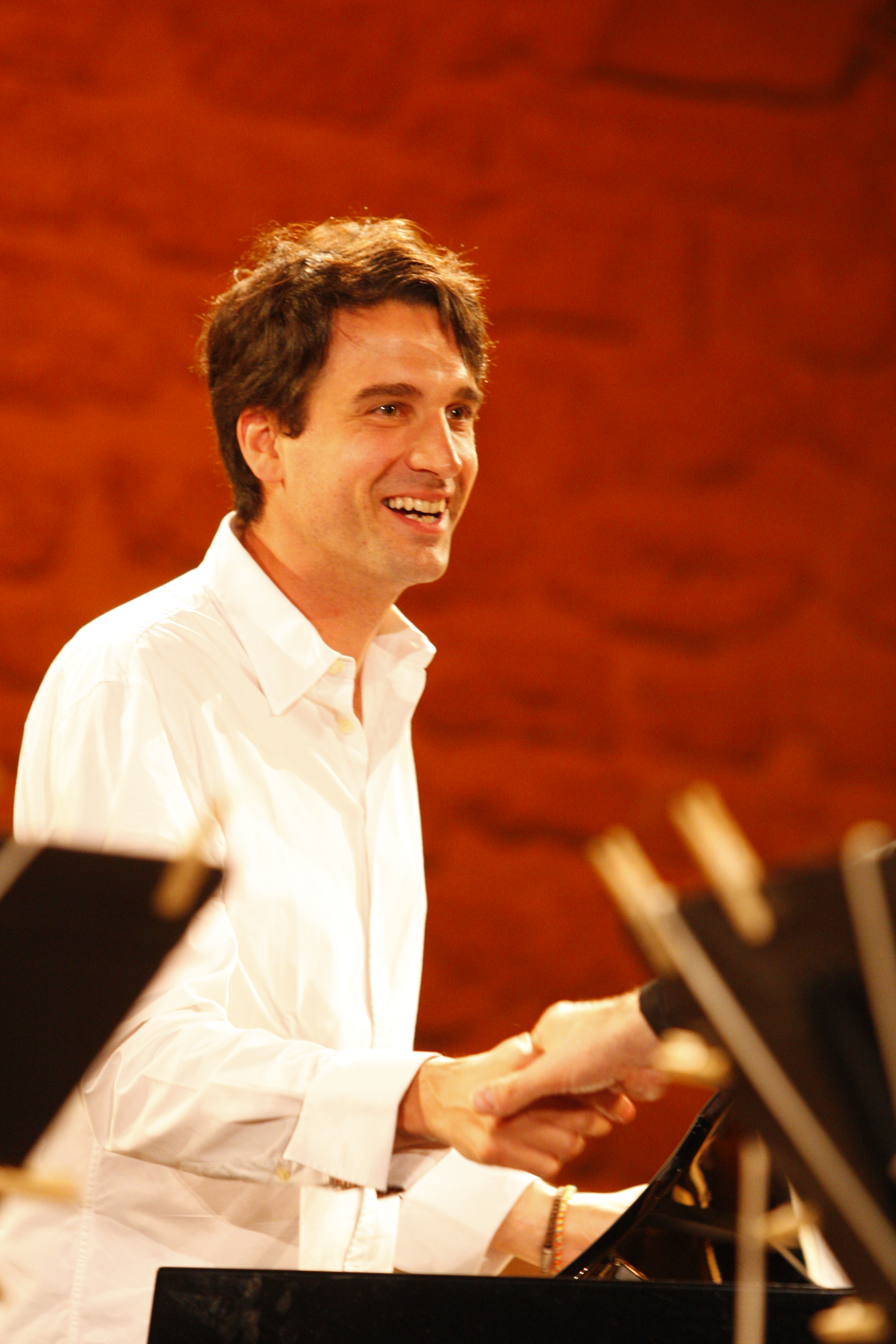

Background information
- Born: 1974 (age 51–52); Paris, France
- Genres: Jazz
- Occupation: Musician
- Instrument: Piano
- Years active: 1990s–present
- Website: baptistetrotignon.com

Baptiste Trotignon (born 1974) is a French jazz pianist and composer.

== Life and career ==
Trotignon was born near Paris in 1974. He started playing the violin at the age of 6 and the piano three years later. His first solo piano album was 2003's Solo. Trotignon composes music and plays "interpretations of music from Led Zeppelin and [Bob] Dylan to Edith Piaf".

== Playing style ==
The Daily Telegraph's Ivan Hewett wrote on the originality of Trotignon's style in 2009 that "Any references are only subliminally present in a style that's very much his own. He has certain favourite devices such as rapid-fire repetitions of single notes, and machine-gun alternations of the hands". The Guardian's John Fordham, commenting on a Trotignon duo concert with percussionist Minino Garay stated that the pianist's playing contained "startling chordal exclamations, plaintively romantic lyricism and [...] a collage of liquid lines and stuttering drumlike invitations to his partner".

== Discography ==
=== As leader or co-leader ===
Year recorded	Title	Label	Personnel/Notes
2000	Fluide	Naïve	Trio
2001	Sightseeing	Naïve	Trio with Clovis Nicolas (bass), Tony Rabeson (drums); reissued 2005
2003	Solo	Naïve	Solo piano
2005	Solo II	Naïve	Solo piano
2005	Trotignon/El-Malek	Naïve	Quartet co-led by David El Malek (tenor sax), with Darryl Hall (bass), Dré Pallemaerts (drums)
2006	Flower Power	Naïve	Trio with Aldo Romano, Rémi Vignolo (bass)
2007	Fool Time	Naïve	Quartet co-led by David El Malek, with Darryl Hall, Dré Pallemaerts
2009	Share	Naïve	Trio with Matt Penman (bass), Otis Brown III or Eric Harland (drums), guests Mark Turner (tenor sax), Tom Harrell (flugelhorn)
2010	Suite...	Naïve	Quartet with Mark Turner, Jeremy Pelt (trumpet), Matt Penman, Eric Harland; one trio track with Thomas Bramerie (bass), Franck Agulhon (drums)
2012	Song, Song, Song	Naïve	Duos and trios with Minino Garay (perc), Thomas Bramerie (bass) a.o. plus strings (trio or quartet), Jeanne Added, Melody Gardot, Christophe Miossec, Monica Passos (vocals)
2013	Dusk Is a Quiet Place	Naïve	Duo with Mark Turner
2014	Hit	Naïve	Trio with Thomas Bramerie (bass), Jeff Ballard (drums)
2015	Different Spaces	Naïve	Piano concerto written by Trotignon, played by Nicholas Angelich with the Orchestre National Bordeaux Aquitaine conducted by Paul Daniel
2016	Chimichurri	Okeh	Duo with Minino Garay (cajón, percussion)
2017	Ancestral Memories	Okeh	Quartet co-led by Yosvany Terry (saxophones, chekeré), with Yunior Terry (bass), Jeff "Tain" Watts (drums)
2019	You've Changed	Sony Classical	Solo piano, duos with Joe Lovano, Avishai Cohen, Ibrahim Maalouf, Thomas de Pourquery, Vincent Ségal, Camélia Jordana
2022	Anima	Alpha Classics	With Orchestre Victor Hugo conducted by Jean-François Verdier
2022	Symphonie du ponant	Coop Breizh	With Didier Squiban, Orchestre National de Bretagne
2022	Body and Soul	Paradise Improvisé	Solo piano
2023	Brexit Music	Paradis Improvisé	Trio, with Matt Penman, Gregory Hutchinson
2024	Pianoforte	Artwork Records	Quartet with Éric Legnini, Pierre de Bethmann, Bojan Z
2024	Piano voix	Tôt ou tard	Duo with Arthur Teboul

=== As sideman ===
Year recorded	Leader	Title	Label
1995	Jean-Luc Chevalier	Hommage à Jaco	Seventh Records
1998	Claudia Solal	My Own Phoolosophy	Soundhills
2001	Christian Brun	French Songs	Elabeth
2001	Pierrick Pédron	Cherokee	Elabeth
2002	Doudou Gouirand	Les Racines Du Ciel	RDC Records
2002	Moutin Reunion Quartet	Power Tree	Shai - Dreyfus/USA
2002	Bill Mobley & The Space Time Big Band New Light	Bill Mobley & The Space Time Big Band New Light	Space Time Records
2003	Jerome Barde	Melodolodie	Sunnyside
2003	OLH Orchestra/Geoffroy Tamisier & Kenny Wheeler	G Meets K	Yolk records
2003	Hervé Krief	Paradis artificiels	NextMusic
2003	Moutin Reunion Quartet	Red Moon	Nocturne
2004	Rick Margitza	Bohemia	Nocturne
2004	André Ceccarelli	Carte blanche	Dreyfus Jazz
2006	Aldo Romano	Chante	Dreyfus Jazz
2007	Stefano di Battista	Trouble Shootin'	Blue Note
2008	Jean Fauque	13 aurores	
2008	Franck Agulhon	Solisticks/2	
2009	André Ceccarelli	Sweet People	(CamJazz)
2011	Aldo Romano	Inner Smile	
2012	Jacques Schwarz-Bart	Art of Dreaming	(Aztec Musique)
2013	Marc Miralta & Perico Sambeat	Flamenco Reunion	(Contrabaix)
2014	Mélanie Dahan	Keys	
2014	Minino Garay	Vamos	
2017	Kate Lindsey	Thousands of miles	
