= Bojan Zulfikarpašić =

Serbian jazz pianist

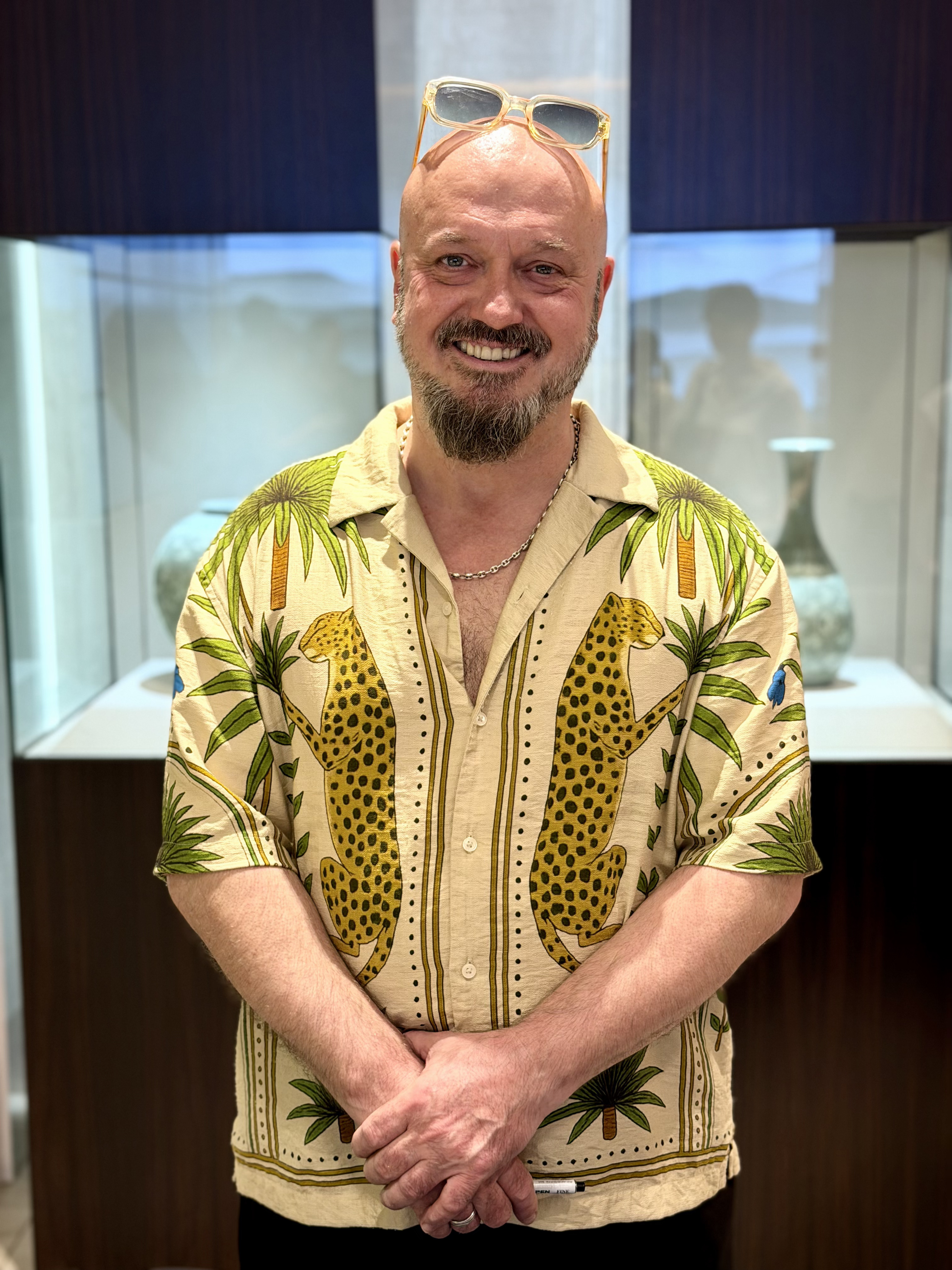
- Bojan Z after a performance at the Korean Cultural Center in Budapest in June, 2026

Background information
- Born: 2 February 1968 (age 58); Belgrade, Serbia
- Genres: Jazz
- Occupation: Musician
- Instrument: Piano
- Years active: 1988–present
- Website: bojanz.com

Bojan Zulfikarpašić (Serbian Cyrillic: Бојан Зулфикарпашић), known professionally as Bojan Z. (born February 2, 1968) is a Serbian jazz pianist.

== Early life ==
He started playing and studying piano at the age of 5 in music school "Kosta Manojlović" in Zemun. As a teenager, he started playing in bands on Belgrade jazz scene, where he received an award as the Best Young Jazz Musician of Yugoslavia award in 1989. Since 1988 Bojan moved to Paris, France, where he developed a successful career as a pianist, composer and producer.

== Later life and career ==
In 1986 studied with Clare Fischer at the Blue Lake Fine Arts Camp in Michigan. He was influenced by the traditional Balkan music playing in an army orchestra during his military service in former Yugoslavia, which would influence all his subsequent work. He moved to Paris in 1988, playing with Henri Texier, Michel Portal, Noël Akchoté, and Julien Lourau.

In 1993, he recorded the debut album with his Bojan Z Quartet, followed by Yopla!. In 1999, he was engaged in Koreni (Roots) with Karim Ziad from Algeria, Kudsi Erguner from Turkey, and Vlatko Stefanovski from Macedonia. On Transpacifik (2003) he started collaborating with Scott Colley and Nasheet Waits, and continued on Xenophonia (2006) with Ben Perowsky and Ari Hoenig, as well as Frenchman Remi Vignolo. He often uses the combination of acoustic piano with Fender Rhodes electric piano, often playing them simultaneously, and recently is claimed to be the inventor of "Xenophone", a hybrid instrument, based on the customized Fender Rhodes electric piano. It can be heard on Xenophonia.

He won the Victoires du Jazz prize in France in 2007 for Xenophonia and in 2013 for Soul Shelter as the Best Albums of the Year.

In 2002, Zulfikarpašić was granted the title of Chevalier de l'ordre des Arts et des Lettres by the French government, and he received the Prix Django Reinhardt for Musician of the Year from the Académie du Jazz. In 2005, he was granted the Hans Koller European Jazz Prize as the Best European Jazz Musician.

== Personal life ==
He was born to a Bosniak mother, while his father comes from the prominent Bosnian family Zulfikarpašić, who originate from Foča in Bosnia and Herzegovina.

== Discography ==
- Bojan Z Quartet (Label Bleu, 1993)
- Yopla! (Label Bleu, 1995)
- Koreni (Label Bleu, 1999)
- Solobsession (Label Bleu, 2001)
- Transpacifik (Label Bleu, 2003)
- Xenophonia (Label Bleu, 2006)
- Humus (EmArcy/Universal, 2009)
- Soul Shelter (Universal, 2012)
- Duo (2birds1stone, 2015)
- Housewarming (Nwog, 2015)

=== As sideman ===
With Henri Texier

- An Indian's Week (Label Bleu, 1993)
- Mosaic Man (Label Bleu, 1998)
- Mad Nomad(s) (Label Bleu, 2002)
- Strings' Spirit (Label Bleu, 2002)

With Julien Lourau

- The Rise (Label Bleu, 2001)
- Fire (Label Bleu, 2005)
- Forget (Label Bleu, 2005)

With others

- Claude Barthelemy, Sereine (Label Bleu, 2000)
- Jean-Jacques Birge, Sarajevo (Suite) (L'Empreinte Digitale, 1994)
- Matt Darriau, Matt Darriau Paradox Trio With Bojan Z. (Felmay, 2010)
- Angelo Debarre, Caprice (Hot Club, 1998)
- Madame Piano, Predeli (ITMM, 1997)
- Malouma, Nour (Marabi, 2007)
- Amira Medunjanin, Amulette (World Village, 2011)
- Amira Medunjanin, Silk & Stone (World Village, 2014)
- Nguyen Le, Purple (ACT, 2002)
- Oktobar 1864, Oktobar 1864 (Jugodisk, 1987)
- Michel Portal, Dockings (Label Bleu, 1998)
- Michel Portal, Bailador (Universal, 2010)
- Nils Wogram, Work Smoothly (Nwog, 2018)
