= Jean-François Verdier =

French clarinetist and conductor

Jean-François Verdier is a French clarinetist and conductor.

Verdier graduated from the Conservatoire de Paris. He has been a soloist with the Paris Opera since 1996. He was a soloist with the Orchestre national du Capitole de Toulouse. He has taught at the Paris Conservatory since 1997.

Considered one of the best European clarinettists and the winner of several international performance prizes, Verdier is also active as a conductor: from 2008 to 2010 he led the Orchestre national de Lyon, and has served as a guest conductor for multiple symphonies, including the Opéra national de Paris and Opéra Bastille.
