= Daniel Huck =

French jazz reedist and singer (1948–2026)

Daniel Huck (22 March 1948 – 25 April 2026) was a French jazz reedist and singer.

Huck started on trombone but abandoned it in his teens, switching to alto saxophone when he was nineteen and working on the waitstaff at the Parisian club Jazzland. He played with the Famous Melody Boys (1968), Jean-Pierre Morel (1969-1973), the Jazzomaniacs (1970-1971), and Gilbert Leroux (1974). In the latter half of the 1970s he worked extensively with the Anachronic Jazz Band, Olivier Franc and Raymond Fonseque, touring with the latter as an accompanist for Cat Anderson and Bill Coleman in 1979. In the early 1980s Huck worked with Philippe Baudoin, Emmanuel Hussenot, and the Hot Antic Jazz Band. He also founded a group called Slapscat (1981-1987) in honor of Slim Gaillard, which went on to play with Gaillard himself when he toured France. Huck worked intermittently with Eddy Louiss from the late 1980s through the end of the 1990s. He won both the Prix Sidney Bechet (1982) and the Prix Django Reinhardt (1997).

Huck died on 25 April 2026, at the age of 78.

== Sources ==
- Howard Rye, "Daniel Huck". The New Grove Dictionary of Jazz. 2nd edition, ed. Barry Kernfeld.
