= Uzeste =

- Commune
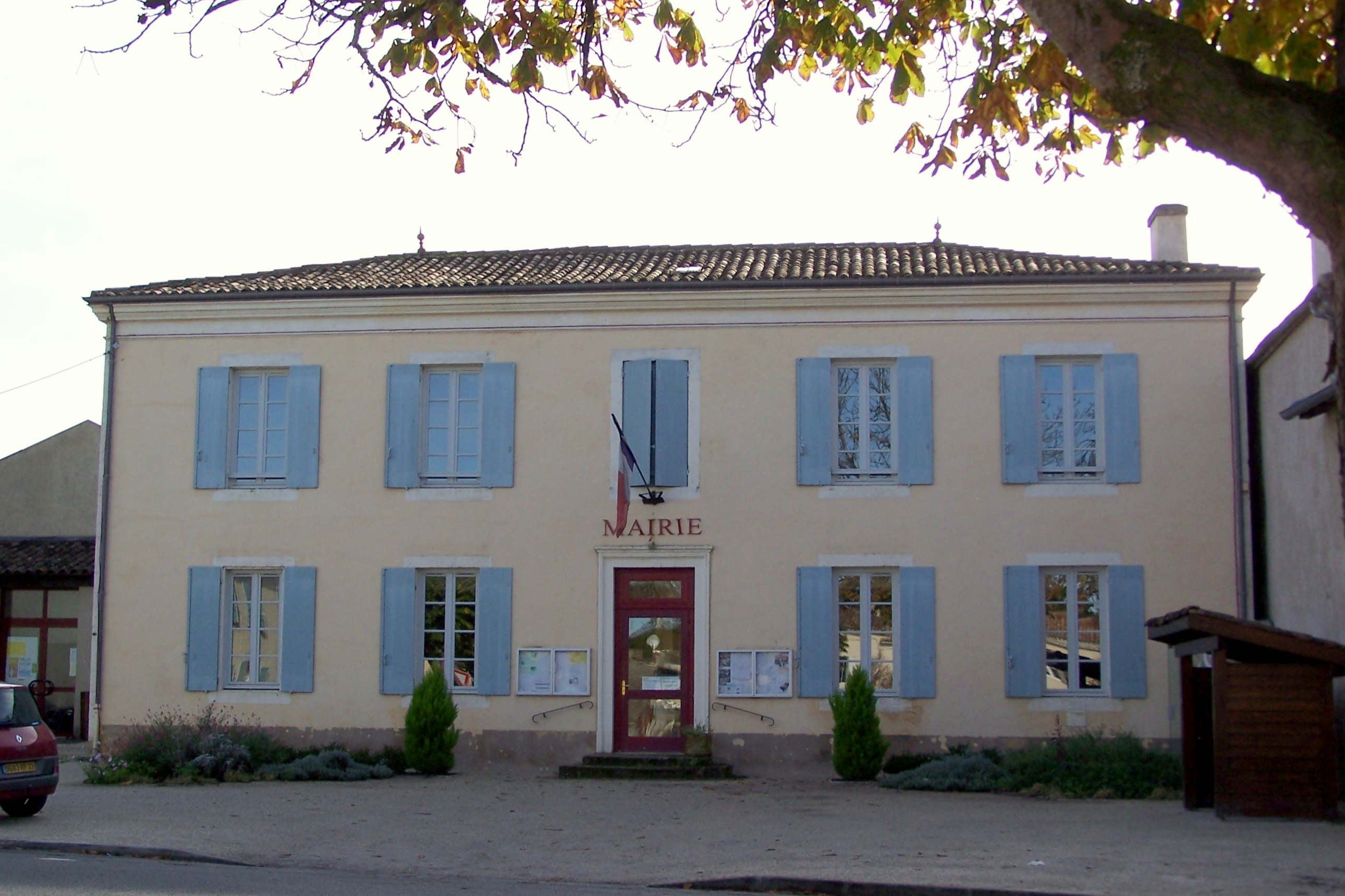
- The town hall in Uzeste
- Location of Uzeste
- Location within France Location within Nouvelle-Aquitaine
- Coordinates: 44°26′33″N 0°19′21″W
- Country: France
- Region: Nouvelle-Aquitaine
- Department: Gironde
- Arrondissement: Langon
- Canton: Le Sud-Gironde

Government
  - Mayor (2020–2026): Éric Douence
- Area^{1}: 26.05 km^{2} (10.06 sq mi)
- Elevation: 68 m (223 ft)
- Highest elevation: 104 m (341 ft)
- Lowest elevation: 24 m (79 ft)
- Population (2023): 462
  - Density: 17.7/km^{2} (45.9/sq mi)
- Time zone: UTC+01:00 (CET)
  - Summer (DST): UTC+02:00 (CEST)
- INSEE/Postal code: 33537 /33730
- ^{1} French Land Register data, which excludes lakes, ponds, glaciers > 1 km^{2} (0.386 sq mi or 247 acres) and river estuaries.

Uzeste (French pronunciation: [yzɛst]; Occitan: Usèste) is a commune in the Gironde department in Nouvelle-Aquitaine in southwestern France. Pope Clement V is buried in the village church.

== Population ==
Historical population
Year	Pop.	±% p.a.
1968	445	—
1975	405	−1.34%
1982	410	+0.18%
1990	351	−1.92%
1999	416	+1.91%
2007	443	+0.79%
2012	413	−1.39%
2017	430	+0.81%
2023	462	+1.20%
Source: INSEE

== See also ==
- Communes of the Gironde department
