= Géraldine Laurent =

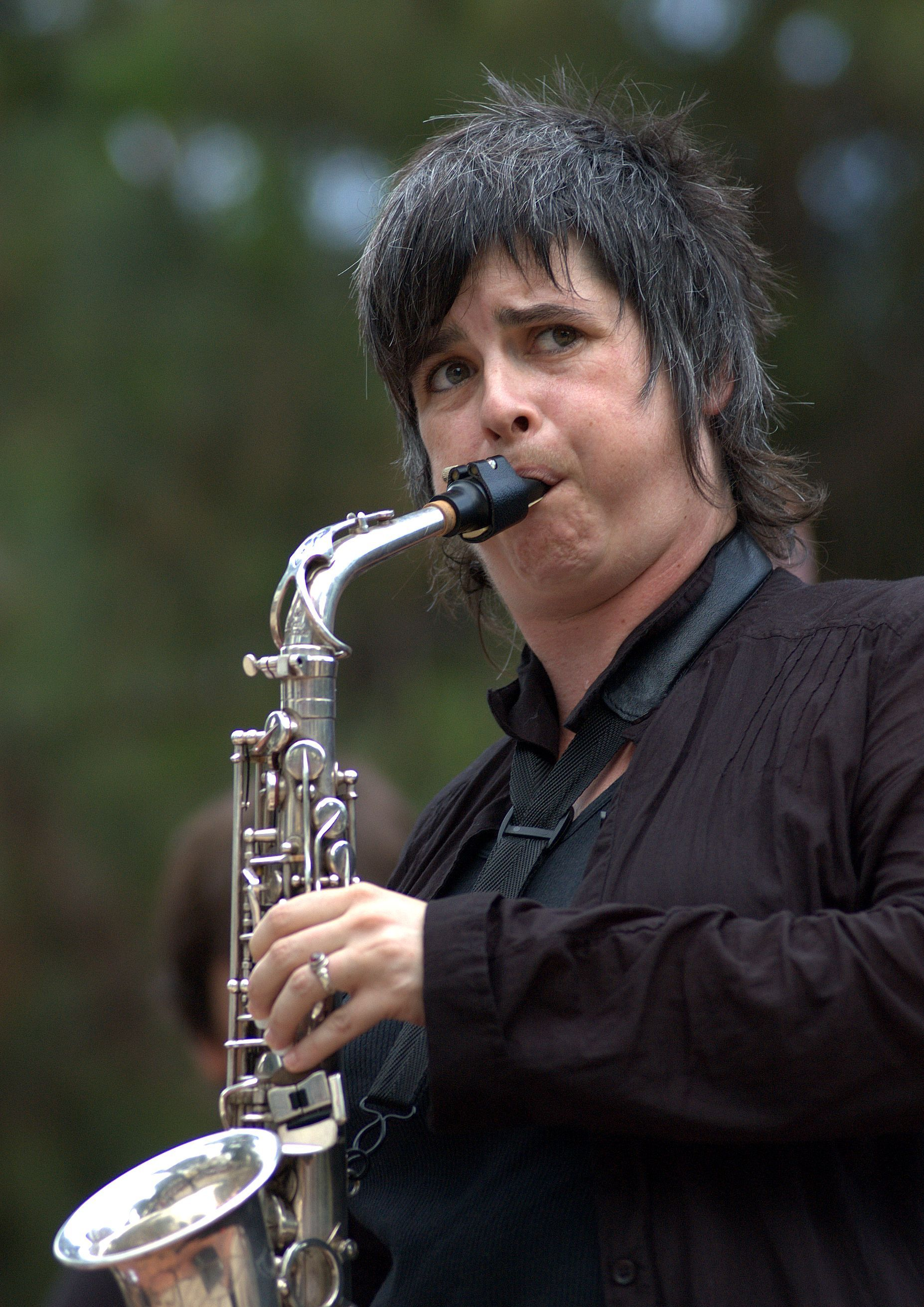
Géraldine Laurent

Géraldine Laurent (born 18 January 1975) is a French jazz alto saxophonist.

Laurent studied classical piano at the Niort conservatoire before changing to alto saxophone at the age of 12. She has been a member of the Christophe Joneau quartet. Along with her main trio with Yoni Zelnik and Laurent Bataille, she also had a trio with Hélène Labarrière et Éric Groleau, concentrating more on free improvisation. She prefers to play jazz standards to original compositions and cites John Coltrane, Wayne Shorter, Sonny Rollins and Eric Dolphy among her influences.

== Discography ==
=== As leader ===
- 2007: Time Out Trio, with Yoni Zelnik and Laurent Bataille (Dreyfus Jazz, Sony bmg)
- 2015: At Work

=== With Aldo Romano ===
- 2008: Just Jazz, with Aldo Romano, Henri Texier, Mauro Negri
- 2010: Complete Communion to Don Cherry, with Romano, Texier, Fabrizio Bosso

=== With Christophe Joneau ===
- 2003: Lavaud Gelade, Christophe Joneau Quartet

=== With Charles Bellonzi ===
- 2006: Abracadadrums, with Charles Bellonzi, Eric Prost, Frédéric d'Oelsnitz, François Gallix (DBA Productions)
