= Académie du Jazz =

The Académie du jazz (English: Jazz Academy) is a non-profit French association created in 1954, which annually awards the best artists and the best musical productions in the world of jazz. The founding president was violinist André Hodeir followed by journalist Maurice Cullaz, radio producer Claude Carrière, and currently François Lacharme. Honorary presidents have included novelist Jean Cocteau, composers Georges Auric and Henri Sauguet, music critic Charles Delaunay, violinist Stéphane Grappelli, pianist Martial Solal and Frédéric Charbaut, co-founder of the Festival Jazz à Saint-Germain-des-Prés.

== Award categories ==
The Oscar

Prize awarded from 1954 to 1975 for best jazz album of the year.

Prix Django Reinhardt

- Prize awarded since 1955 for the French jazz musician of the year. It is named after French musician Django Reinhardt.

Prix Sidney Bechet

- Prize awarded between 1969 and 2002 for the best French jazz musician in traditional style. It was named after jazz musician Sidney Bechet.

Grand Prix de l'Académie du jazz

- Prize awarded since 1972 for the best jazz album of the year.

Prix Boris Vian or Prix du Disque Français

- Prize awarded for the best jazz album of the year by a French musician. It is originally named after French writer Boris Vian in 1972. In 2004, it was replaced by the Prix du Disque Français.

Prix Bill Coleman or Prix du Jazz Classique

- Prize awarded for the best classical jazz album from 1973 to 1988. It was originally called the Prix du meilleur disque de Jazz Classique. It was renamed after American jazz trumpeter Bill Coleman in 1980, and is now known as Prix du Jazz Classique.

Prix Fats Waller or Prix de la Meilleure Réédition ou du Meilleur Inédit

- Prize awarded since 1993 for the best reissue or new release of previously unpublished jazz recordings. It was originally named after American jazz pianist Fats Waller from 1958 to 1992. In 1993 and 1994, it was awarded the productions of the classical and traditional jazz. From 2000 to 2006, it was named Prix Maurice Cullaz after French jazz critic Maurice Cullaz.

Prix Billie Holiday or Prix du Jazz Vocal

- Prize awarded since 1973 for the best vocal jazz album. It was originally named after American jazz singer Billie Holiday until 2004.

Prix Mahalia Jackson

- Prize awarded for the best gospel album from 1972 to 2002. It was named after American gospel singer Mahalia Jackson.

Prix Big Bill Broonzy or Prix Blues

- Prize awarded since 1967 for the best blues album. It was originally named after American blues musician Big Bill Broonzy until 2004.

Prix Otis Redding or Prix Soul

- Prize awarded since 1967 for the best R&B/Soul album. It was originally named after American soul singer Otis Redding until 2004.

Prix Bobby Jaspar or Prix du Musicien Européen

- Prize awarded for best European jazz musician. It was originally named after Belgian saxophonist Bobby Jasper.

Prix Charles Delaunay or Prix du Livre de Jazz

- Prize awarded since 1985 for the best jazz book. It was originally called Le Prix du Livre de Jazz. It was renamed after French jazz critic Charles Delaunay from 1988 to 2004.

In Memoriam

- Prize previously awarded for posthumous releases.
