= Sylvain Luc =

French jazz musician (1965–2024)

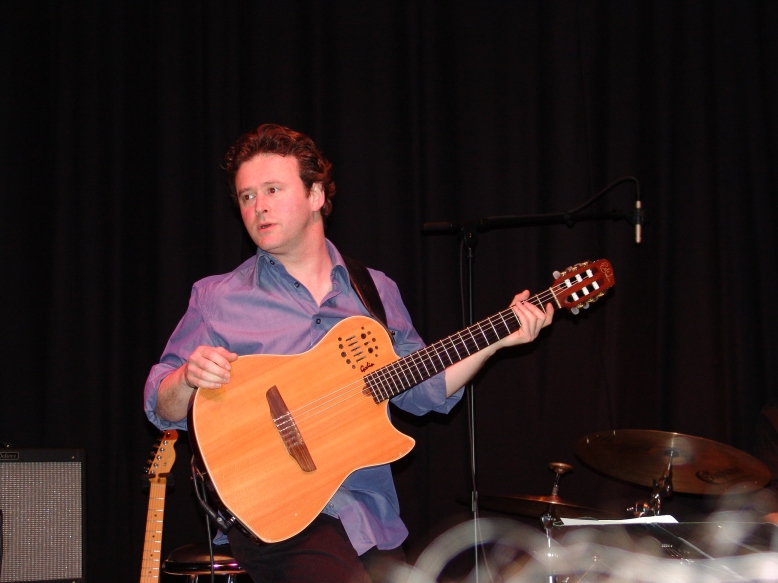
- Luc at the Club Jazz Dunkerque

Background information
- Born: 7 April 1965; Bayonne, France
- Died: 13 March 2024 (aged 58)
- Genres: Gypsy jazz, swing, jazz fusion
- Occupation: Musician
- Instrument: Guitar
- Years active: 1977–2024
- Label: Dreyfus
- Website: www.sylvainluc.fr

Sylvain Luc (7 April 1965 – 13 March 2024) was a French jazz guitarist.

Luc toured regularly but rarely appeared in high-profile jazz festivals. He was particularly attracted to duets, but was also seen in trios (his own, plus Trio Sud, and on tour in 2009 with Steve Gadd and Richard Bona) and rarely with larger groups. His best-known works are the two duet albums with Biréli Lagrène, with whom he toured many times.

== Biography ==
=== Childhood and musical studies ===
Luc was born in Bayonne, France, the youngest of three brothers. He mastered the guitar, cello, violin, and mandolin as a child. His two elder brothers (Gérard, the eldest, playing the accordion and Serge, playing drums) were both musicians who regularly played in balls. At the age of 4, he laid his hands on a toy guitar with only three strings left on it and was allowed to accompany his brothers on rehearsals. Even at such a young age, he was able to play accurate chords. As a result, he started touring with his brothers playing balls at a very early age.

Being immersed in a musical environment, he was regularly in touch with other musicians. One of them, the late Joe Rossi (who taught accordion to his elder brother Gérard), suggested that he to listen to (and offered him an LP of) Joe Pass (Portraits of Duke Ellington). This, and other encounters at his parents' home (in particular guitar player Michel Ducau-Lucart, who offered him his first guitar), led him to listen to, and appreciate, jazz music.

At age 9 he performed for the first time on an album with his brothers (Elgarrekin), and played in the first part of a concert of Joe Dassin with a local group. He also entered the conservatoire of Bayonne. While the guitar is his instrument of choice, there were no courses for the guitar at the conservatoire, so he chose to study cello instead, and gained a taste for classical music. Luc commented that his study of the cello helped him build strength in his fingers which was beneficial for guitar.

At age 12, he performed on a second album with his brothers, Oinakarin. He also became proficient with other instruments along the way, including the mandolin, the violin and the bass.

=== Beginning of solo career ===
At age 15, Luc formed a jazz group called the "Bulle Quintet," and quickly gained recognition. Two years later, in 1982, he and his group were elected laureate of the international festival of San Sebastian.

Luc quickly became the most sought-after guitarist and bassist in the Basque region and began to tour regularly. In 1985, he met Marie-Ange Damestoy and became her guitarist, arranger and composer. Two years later, in 1987, they were nominated revelation of the Printemps de Bourges.

=== Paris and after ===
In 1988, he settled in Paris and became an arranger, composer and accompanist to many different French artists, including Catherine Lara, Michel Jonasz, all while being the bassist for the Richard Galliano trio.

In 1999, he founded Trio Sud with André Ceccarelli and Jean-Marc Jafet, an ensemble with which he received the French Music Award for Jazz as best group of the year in 2003. After 2006, he worked in quartets with Didier Lockwood, Victor Bailey and Billy Cobham. In 2009 he toured across Europe with Steve Gadd and Richard Bona.

Among the musicians he played with are Al Jarreau, Dee Dee Bridgewater, Michel Legrand, Erkan Oğur, Richard Bona, Steve Gadd, Biréli Lagrène, Renaud Garcia-Fons, Elvin Jones, Wynton Marsalis, Stéphane Belmondo, Manu Katché, Michel Portal, Bobby Thomas Jr., Andy Sheppard, Jacky Terrasson, André Ceccarelli, Jean-Marc Jafet, Alain Caron, Didier Lockwood, John McLaughlin, Bernard Lubat, Lokua Kanza, Richard Galliano, Steve Lukather, Billy Cobham, Victor Bailey, Dario Chiazzolino, Larry Coryell, Al Di Meola, and Tommy Emmanuel.

== Death ==
Luc died of a heart attack on 13 March 2024 on Charles Friedel street in the 20th arrondissement of Paris at the age of 58. His funeral was held on 26 March at the crematorium of the Père-Lachaise cemetery where he was cremated; he was buried two days later at the Saint-Pierre cemetery in Marseille.

== Instruments ==
Luc mostly played Godin Multiac guitars, both the nylon and steel string versions. He also, but less frequently, played with the Godin 5th Avenue series (he is seen with a black 5th Avenue guitar on his album Standards). He also played classical guitars.

== Style ==
Luc mostly played fingerstyle, even with a steel string guitar, and sometimes used a plectrum, often switching during the course of a single song.

Luc sometimes detuned the sixth (and even fifth) strings of his guitars (sometimes up to an octave below normal), both to emulate a bass sound while accompanying and to accompany himself in solos.

== Discography ==
=== As leader ===
- Piaia (Transat, 1993)
- Petits deja... with Louis Winsberg (Bleu Citron, 1994)
- Terre Indigo with Catherine Lara (PolyGram, 1996)
- Duet with Bireli Lagrene (Dreyfus, 1999)
- Ameskeri with Stephane Belmondo (Shai, 1999)
- Piaia Naia with Francis Lassus (Disques Concord, 1999)
- Sud with Trio Sud (Dreyfus, 2000)
- Nahia (Pygmalion, 2000)
- Trio Sud (Dreyfus, 2002)
- Solo Ambre (Dreyfus, 2003)
- Joko (Dreyfus, 2006)
- Young and Fine with Trio Sud (Dreyfus, 2008)
- Standards (Dreyfus, 2009)
- Organic with Andre Ceccarelli (Dreyfus, 2011)
- Roots & Wings with Phil Abraham (Challenge, 2014)
- Giu' La Testa with Stefano di Battista (Just Looking, 2014)
- La Vie En Rose with Richard Galliano (Le Chant du Monde, 2015)
- D'une Rive a L'autre with Marylise Florid (Jade, 2019)
- 2.0 with Stephane Belmondo (Naive, 2019)
- By Renaud Letang (Just Looking Productions, 2021)

=== As sideman ===
With Andre Ceccarelli

- 61:32 (BMG, 1999)
- Carte Blanche (Dreyfus, 2004)
- Ultimo (EmArcy/Universal, 2012)
- Twelve Years Ago (Bonsai Music, 2013)

With others

- Charles Aznavour, Jazznavour (EMI, 1998)
- Gerard Berliner, Heureux (Une Musique, 1997)
- Richard Bona, The Ten Shades of Blues (EmArcy/Universal, 2009)
- Patrick Bruel, Juste Avante (RCA, 1999)
- Edith Butler, Madame Butlerfly (Kappa, 2003)
- Richard Galliano, New Jazz Musette (Ponderosa, 2016)
- Jean Guidoni, Aux Tourniquets Des Grands Cafes (Malambo, 1990)
- Jean Guidoni, Vertigo Paradoxe, (Polygram, 1995)
- Francoise Hardy, Le Danger (Virgin, 1996)
- Jacques Higelin, Aux Heros De La Voltige (EMI, 1994)
- Jean-Marc Jafet, Live Au Parc Floral (RDC, 1996)
- Jean-Marc Jafet, Mes Anges (Cristal, 2004)
- Jairo, Live Bataclan (Malambo, 1988)
- Lokua Kanza, 3 (RCA, 1998)
- Lokua Kanza, Plus Vivant (EmArcy/Universal, 2005)
- Catherine Lara, Melomanie (Guy Cloutier, 1997)
- Catherine Lara, Aral (XXL, 1999)
- Philippe Leotard, A L'amour Comme a La Guerre (Chansons) (Gorgone, 1990)
- Linda Lewis, Second Nature (Sony, 1995)
- Didier Lockwood, Onztet De Violon Jazz (JMS, 1994)
- Didier Lockwood, For Stephane (Ames, 2008)
- Vincent Peirani, Gunung Sebatu (Zig Zag, 2010)
- William Sheller, Avatars (Mercury, 2008)
- Fabienne Thibeault, Martin De Touraine (A.D.L., 1996)
- Trio Chemirani, Invite Accords (Croises, 2011)
