= Maurice Vander =

French jazz keyboardist (1929–2017)

- Born: Maurice Camille Gustave Vanderschueren; June 11, 1929; Vitry-sur-Seine, France
- Died: February 16, 2017 (aged 87) Montmorillon
- Genres: Jazz
- Occupation: Musician
- Instruments: Accordion; piano

Maurice Vanderschueren, better known as Maurice Vander (11 June 1929 in Vitry-sur-Seine – 16 February 2017 in Montmorillon), was a French jazz keyboardist.

Vander worked in the 1950s with Don Byas, Django Reinhardt, Bobby Jaspar, Jimmy Raney, Stephane Grappelli, Chet Baker, and Kenny Clarke. He won the Prix Django Reinhardt in 1962. In the 1960s he was a session musician for Roger Guerin, Pierre Gossez, and Boulou Ferré, and played with Claude Nougaro and Ivan Jullien. He played with Baker again in the late 1970s and with Johnny Griffin; his later work included performing and recording with Clarke, Richie Cole, Art Farmer, and Benny Powell.

Vander is the adoptive father of Christian Vander.
