= Sophie Alour =

French jazz musician and composer

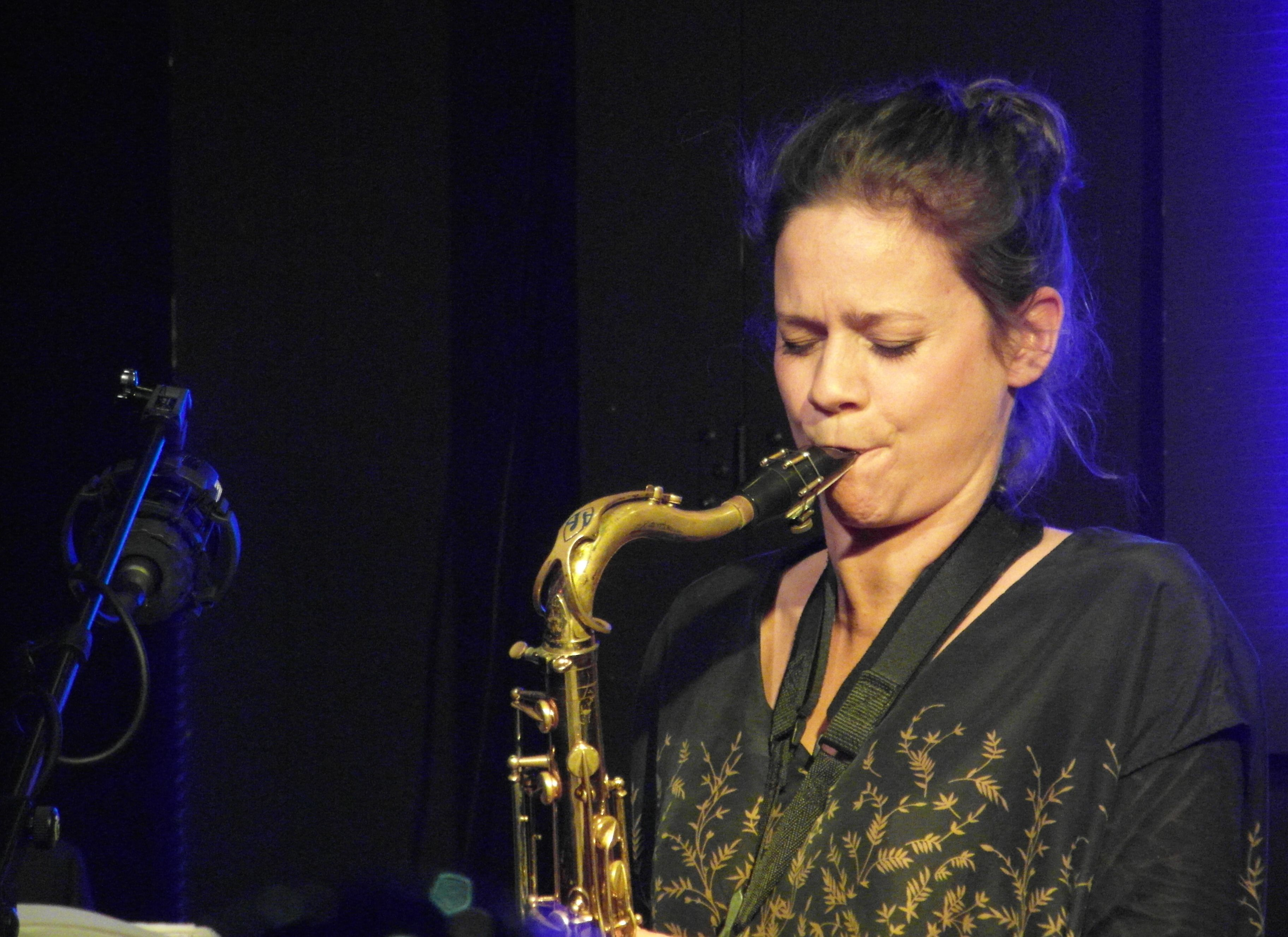
- Sophie Alour in 2013

Background information
- Born: 24 December 1974 (age 51); Quimper, France
- Genre: Jazz
- Occupation: Musician
- Instruments: Tenor saxophone, soprano saxophone, clarinet
- Website: sophiealour.com

Sophie Alour (born 24 December 1974) is a French jazz musician who plays saxophone, clarinet, and flute.

== Biography ==
Alour started playing the clarinet at the music school in Quimper, when she was 13 years of age. When she was 19, she started to play saxophone, for the most part self-taught, supplemented with courses at CIM in Paris, and IACP.

In 2000 she was part of establishing the "Vintage Orchestra", with Fabien Maria, Thomas Savy, Jerry Edwards and Yoann Loustalot (the album ''Thad'' in 2005). In 2001, she founded a sextet with Stéphane Belmondo and played in the band "Manita" with Jean-Daniel Botta, in a big band, with Christophe Dal Sasso who released the album "Ouverture" (with Stéphane and Lionel Belmondo, who appeared at Nocturne) and played at the Marciac Festival in 2004 with Quartet, to Rhoda Scott (who recorded Lady Quartet a live recording in Sunset (2009), and at Jazz à Vienne (2010). The same year she played at the Jazz à Vienne, participated in a project with Aldo Romano and played in a big band with Wynton Marsalis.

In 2005 she released her first solo album "Insulaire" at Nocturne, mainly with her own compositions, and with guitarist Hugo Lippi, Emmanuel Bex, Stéphane Belmondo on the team. In Elektro-Big with Benjamin Roy came "DJ Killer" and "Be Where You Are" (2006), with pianist Alexandre Saada. In 2007, the album "Uncaged" followed, with pianist Laurent Coq, guitarist Sébastien Martel, Yoni Zelnik on upright bass and Karl Jannuska on drums. In 2010, she released her trio album, Opus 3,, in 2012 the quintet album La géographie des rêves (with Stéphan Caracci vibraphone, Yoann Loustalot trumpet and flugel horn, Alour on bass clarinet, clarinet and tenor saxophone, Nicolas Moreaux and Frédéric Pasqua drums). In 2011 she played on the album Prétextes by Christophe Dal Sasso. In 2013, the Shaker album came with organist Frederic Nardin and drummer Frédéric Pasqua.

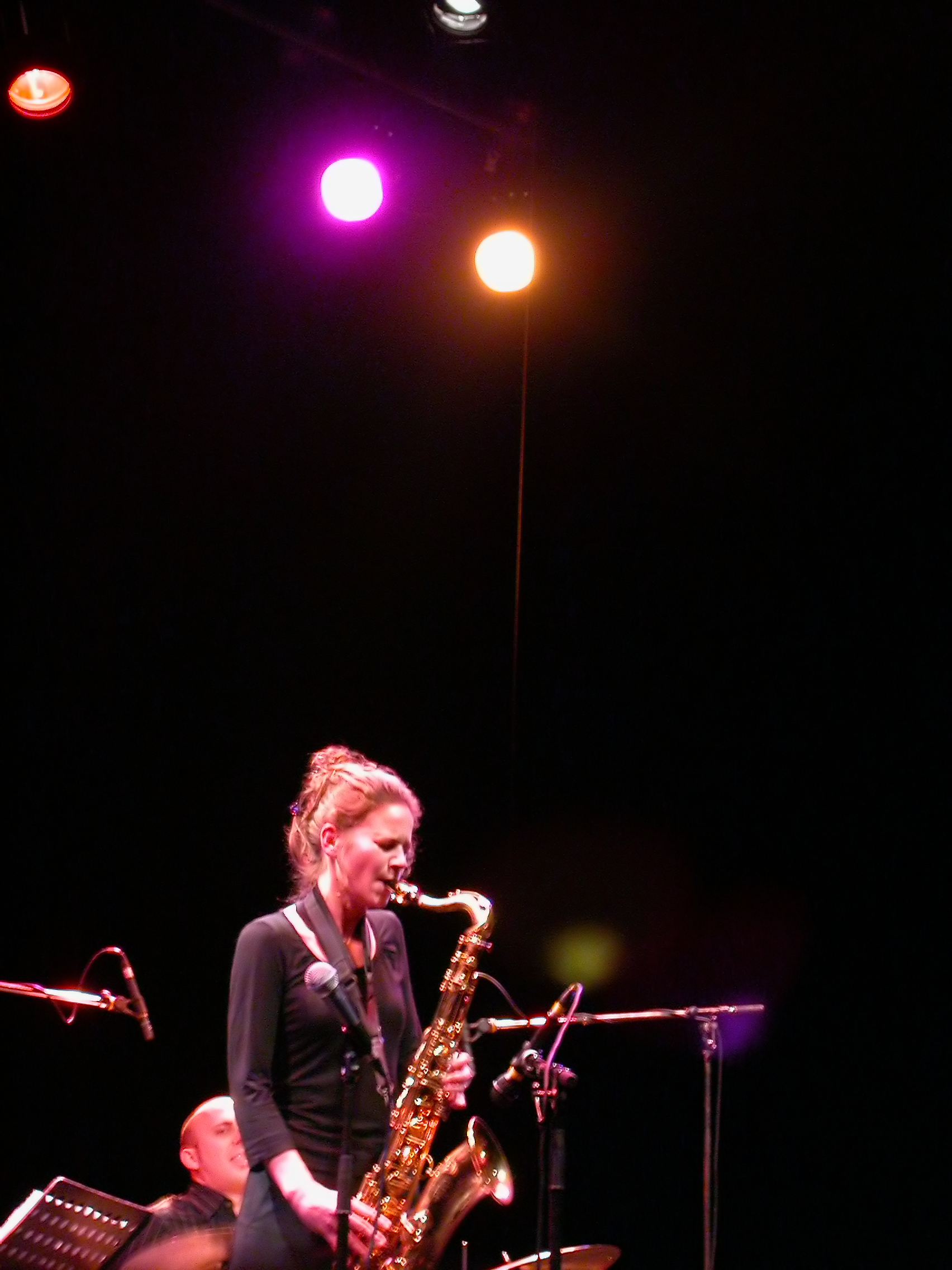
Sophie Alour (Révélation Jazz à Juan 2005)

== Honors ==
- 2007: Awarded the French Django d’Or talent award.

== Discography ==
- 2005: Insulaire (Nocturn)
- 2007: Uncaged (Nocturn)
- 2009: Opus 3 (Plus Loin Music)
- 2011: La Géographie Des Rêves (Naïve)
- 2013: Shaker (Naïve)
- 2017: Time For Love (Music From Source)
- 2020: Joy (Music From Source)
- 2021: Enjoy (Music From Source)
- 2023: Le temps virtuose (Music From Source)
