= René Urtreger =

French bebop pianist (1934–2026)

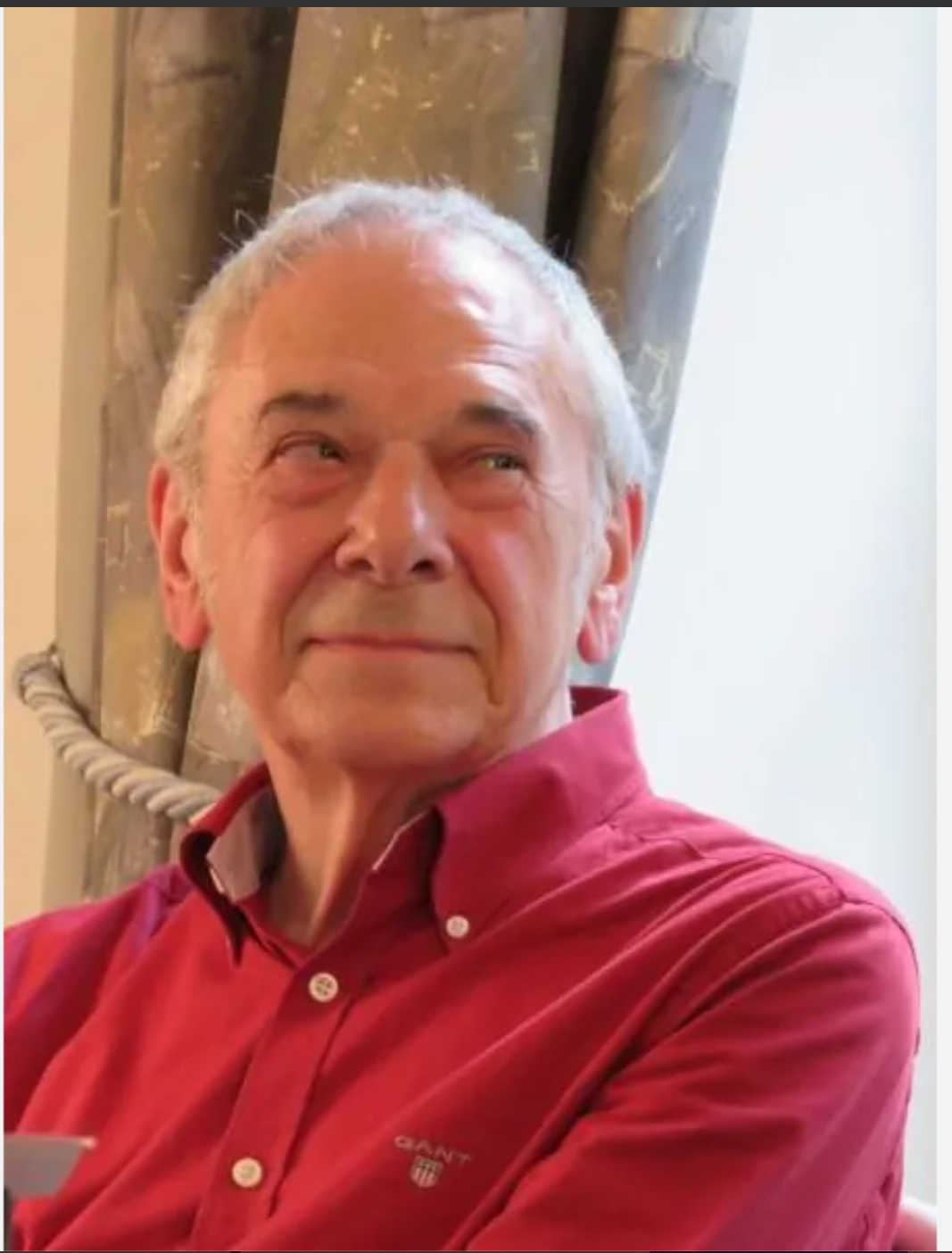
- Urtreger in 2024

Background information
- Born: 6 July 1934; Paris, France
- Died: 16 July 2026 (aged 92)
- Genre: Bebop
- Occupations: Musician; composer
- Instrument: Piano
- Label: Fontana

René Urtreger (6 July 1934 – 16 July 2026) was a French bebop pianist.

== Early life ==
Urtreger was born in Paris on 6 July 1934, the son of Polish-Jewish immigrants, and began his piano studies at the age of four, studying privately first, and then at the Conservatory. He studied with an orientation toward jazz, playing in a small Parisian club, the Sully d'Auteuil. Conducted by Hubert Damisch, the Sully boasted an orchestra of talented students including Sacha Distel and Jean-Louis Viale. In 1953, Urtreger won first prize in a piano contest for amateurs, and from that moment decided to be a professional musician.

== Later life and career ==
In a Parisian concert in 1954, he accompanied two great American expatriates: saxophonist Don Byas and trumpeter Buck Clayton. Their collaboration in the "Salon de Jazz" became one of the most highly requested French performances by the American musicians that toured the French capital.

After serving in the military from 1955 to 1957, Urtreger would play in a club on the left bank of the Seine, the famous Club Saint-Germain. Again he collaborated with two jazz masters: Miles Davis and Lester Young. His work so impressed the latter that Urteger accompanied Young for a short tour of Europe in 1956. In December 1957, he was part of Davis's group which recorded the soundtrack to the film Ascenseur pour l'échafaud (Elevator to the Gallows).

In the late 1950s he worked with the likes of Lionel Hampton, Stan Getz, Chet Baker, Dexter Gordon, Sonny Rollins and Ben Webster among others. Shortly thereafter, he broadened his focus to accompany other artists of other genres, largely due to financial necessity. His canon of jazz work is still widely regarded as sensitive with a full, dense sound of swing. The Academie du Jazz of France formally recognized his accomplishments in 1961 with the Prix Django Reinhardt for outstanding jazz artist of the year.

He subsequently provided soundtracks for films by Claude Berri among others.

In 1977, he reappeared on the Paris jazz scene with the intention to resume his career. His renaissance was as a small-ensemble accompanist, with Lee Konitz, Aldo Romano or Barney Wilen. His 1980 performance at the Antibes Jazz Festival was an important performance of his later career. He was also featured at "Le Jazz Cool, Le Jazz Hot: A Celebration of Modern Jazz in Los Angeles and France" at the Getty Museum in Los Angeles (November 2007).

In an interview, Urtreger said, "Jazz is supposed to be a music of improvisation, of madness".

== Death ==
Urtreger died on 16 July 2026, at the age of 92.

== Awards ==
- Grand Prix SACEM (1997)
- Grand Prix du Disque (2000)
- Victoire de la Musique, Category Jazz, for the album HUM (2000)
- Honorary Victoire de la Musique for his Overall Contribution (2005)
- Officer of the Order of Arts and Literature (2006)

== Discography ==
=== As leader ===
- Joue Bud Powell (Barclay, 1955)
- Rene Urtreger Trio (Versailles, 1957)
- Jazz Piano International with Derek Smith, Dick Katz (Atlantic, 1958)
- Hum! with Daniel Humair, Pierre Michelot (Vega, 1960)
- Les Double Six (Columbia, 1961)
- Pianos Puzzle (Saravah, 1970)
- Recidive (Sonopresse, 1978)
- Urtreger Michelot Humair with Pierre Michelot & Daniel Humair (Carlyne, 1979)
- En Direct D'Antibes (Carlyne, 1980)
- Jazzman (Carlyne, 1985)
- Masters with Niels-Henning Orsted Pedersen (Carlyne, 1987)
- Serena (Carlyne, 1990)
- Didi's Bounce (Saravah, 1991)
- Move (Black and Blue, 1997)
- Et Maintenant with Jean-Pierre Cassel (Kiron Musik, 2000)
- Onirica (Sketch, 2001)
- Tentatives (Minium/Discograph, 2006)
- Something to Live For with Isabelle Georges (Elabeth, 2006)
- Live (Atelier Sawano, 2007)
- 75 (Carlyne, 2009)
- Rene Urtreger Yves Torchinsky Eric Dervieu (Carlyne, 2014)
- Premier Rendez-Vous with Agnes Desarthe (Naive, 2017)

=== As sideman ===
With Chet Baker

- Brussels 1964 (Landscape, 1992)
- Chet Baker and His Quintet with Bobby Jaspar (Barclay, 1959)
- Chet Baker in Paris 1955-1956 (Blue Star, 1975)
- Chet Baker, Rene Urtreger, Aldo Romano, Pierre Michelot (Carlyne, 1989)

With Miles Davis

- Ascenseur Pour L'Echafaud (Fontana, 1958)
- Jazz Track (Columbia, 1959)
- The Complete Amsterdam Concert (Celluloid, 1984)

With Claude Francois

- A L'Olympia (Philips, 1969)
- J'y Pense et Puis J'oublie (Mercury, 2014)
- Une Petite Larme M'a Trahi (Mercury, 2014)

With Stan Getz

- With European Friends (LRC, 1985)
- In Paris 1958-1959 (Royal, 1987)
- Pennies from Heaven (Eclipse, 1990)
- Sweetie Pie (Philology, 1992)

With Lester Young

- Le Dernier Message de Lester Young (Barclay, 1959)
- Lester Young in Paris (Verve, 1960)
- Prez in Europe (HighNote, 2002)

With others

- Elek Bacsik & Stephane Grappelli, Europa Jazz (Europa Jazz 1982)
- Gary Burton, Live in Cannes (Jazz World, 1995)
- Gary Burton, No More Blues (TKO Magnum 2000)
- Kenny Clarke, Plays Andre Hodeir (Philips, 1956)
- Henri Crolla, Stephane Grappelli, Notre Ami Django Hommage de Ses Compagnons (Vega, 1958)
- Nathan Davis, Peace Treaty (SFP, 1965)
- Anne Ducros, Piano, Piano (Dreyfus, 2005)
- Hubert Fol, You Go to My Head (Barclay, 1956)
- Jimmy Gourley, Jimmy Gourley and the Paris Heavyweights (52e Rue Est, 1984)
- Stephane Grappelli, Stephane Grappelli (Gitanes Jazz, 1991)
- Lionel Hampton, Crazy Rhythm (EmArcy, 1955)
- Lionel Hampton, Jam Session in Paris (EmArcy, 1955)
- Michel Hausser, Up in Hamburg (Columbia, 1960)
- Michel Hausser, Vibes + Flute (Columbia, 1960)
- Bobby Jaspar, Bobby Jaspar and His All Stars (EmArcy, 1956)
- Didier Lockwood, For Stephane (Ames, 2008)
- Stuff Smith & Stephane Grappelli, Stuff and Steff (Barclay, 1965)
- Rene Thomas, The Real Cat (Gitanes Jazz, 2000)
