= Michel Portal =

French composer, saxophonist and clarinetist (1935–2026)

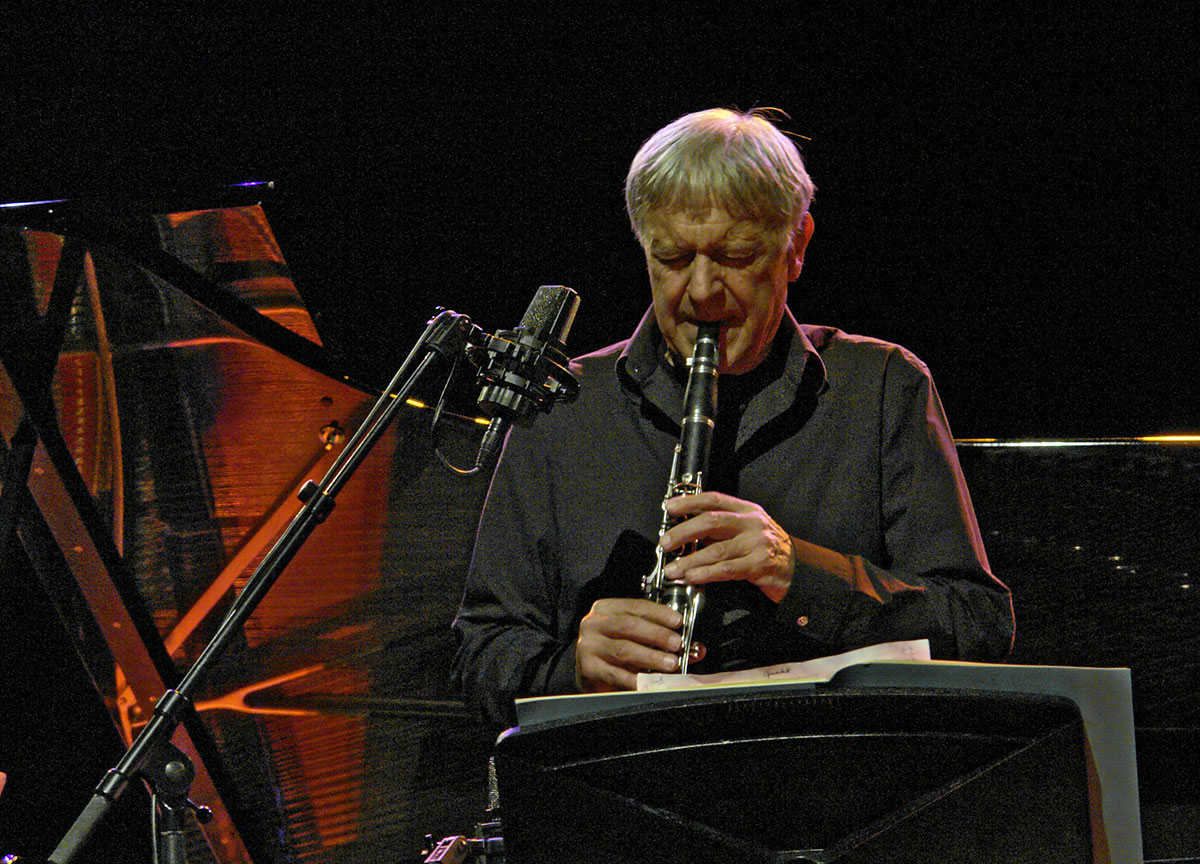

Background information
- Born: 27 November 1935; Bayonne, France
- Died: 12 February 2026 (aged 90) Paris, France
- Genres: Jazz; classical; avant-garde music; film music
- Occupations: Musician; composer
- Instruments: Saxophone; clarinet; bandoneon
- Years active: 1950s–2026
- Labels: Label Bleu; Harmonia Mundi; EMI Classics; Universal France

Michel Portal (27 November 1935 – 12 February 2026) was a French composer, saxophonist and clarinetist. He played both jazz and classical music and is considered to be "one of the architects of modern European jazz".

== Early life ==
Portal was born in Bayonne on 27 November 1935. His family was musical and there were several instruments in his house when he was growing up. His interest in jazz began after hearing it on the radio after World War II. He studied clarinet at the Conservatoire de Paris and conducting with Pierre Dervaux.

== Career ==
Portal "gained experience in light music with the bandleaders Henri Rossotti and (in Spain in 1958) Perez Prado, as well as with the drummer Benny Bennett (1960), Raymond Fonsèque (1963), Aimé Barelli, and, for many years, the singer Claude Nougaro". Portal co-founded the free improvisation group New Phonic Art. During 1969, Portal played on a recording of Karlheinz Stockhausen's Aus den sieben Tagen.

Portal began scoring music for films in the 1980s. He has won the César Award for Best Music Written for a Film three times.

== Death ==
Portal died in Paris on 12 February 2026, at the age of 90.

== Discography ==
=== As leader ===
- Johannes Brahms: Sonates pour clarinette et piano, op. 120 with Georges Pludermacher (Harmonia Mundi, 1969)
- Our Meanings and Our Feelings (Pathé, 1969)
- Alors!!! with John Surman, Barre Phillips, Stu Martin and Jean-Pierre Drouet (Futura, 1970)
- Splendid Yzlment (CBS, 1972)
- À Châteauvallon: No, No but It May Be (Le Chant du Monde, 1973)
- Francis Poulenc: Sonatas (EMI, 1973)
- ¡Dejarme solo! (Cy, 1979)
- Arrivederci / Le Chouartse with Pierre Favre and Léon Francioli (Hat Hut, 1981)
- L'Ombre Rouge (Musiques pour le film de Jean-Louis Comolli) (Saravah, 1981)
- Le Retour de Martin Guerre / Balles perdues (RCA 'Ciné Music', 1983)
- Les Cavaliers de l'orage (RCA 'Ciné Music', 1984)
- Bras de fer O.S.T. (Trema, 1985)
- Men's Land (Label Bleu, 1987)
- Turbulence (Harmonia Mundi, 1987)
- 9–11 pm Town Hall with Daniel Humair, Martial Solal, Joachim Kühn, Jean-François Jenny-Clark and Marc Ducret (Label Bleu, 1988)
- Mozart: Concerto pour clarinette with Vienna Chamber Orchestra and Philippe Entremont (Harmonia Mundi, 1989)
- Festival de Lille – Novembre 1990 with David Liebman, Trilok Gurtu, Mino Cinélu (Marianne, 1990)
- Brahms: Sonates pour clarinette et piano / Trio pour piano, clarinette et violoncelle with Mikhaïl Rudy and Boris Pergamenschikow (EMI Classics, 1993)
- Any Way (Label Bleu, 1993)
- Mozart: Quintette avec clarinette, K. 581 / Trio "Des Quilles", K. 498 with Gérard Caussé, Jean-Philippe Collard and Cherubini Quartet (EMI Classics, 1995)
- Musiques de cinémas (déjouées avec des amis Jazzmen) (Label Bleu, 1995)
- Dockings (Label Bleu, 1998)
- Rencontre – Duos pour clarinettes (by Haydn, Mozart, Rousseau, Yost and C. Ph. E. Bach) with Paul Meyer (EMI Classics, 1998)
- Fast Mood with Martial Solal (BMG France/RCA Victor, 1999)
- Burundi with Stephen Kent and Mino Cinélu (PAO, 2000)
- Minneapolis (Universal France, 2000)
- Minneapolis – We Insist! (Universal Fr, 2002)
- Concerts (Dreyfus, 2004)
- Birdwatcher (Universal Fr/Sunnyside, 2007)
- Bailador (EMI Classics, 2010)
- Radar (Intuition, 2016)
- Eternal Stories (Erato, 2017)
- MP85 (Label Bleu, 2021)

=== As sideman ===
With Barbara

- Barbara No. 2 (Philips, 1965)
- Le Soleil Noir (Philips, 1968)
- Barbara chante Barbara (Philips, 1978)
- L'Aigle Noir (Philips, 1981)

With Richard Galliano

- Laurita (Dreyfus, 1995)
- Blow Up (Dreyfus, 1997)
- French Touch (Dreyfus, 1998)
- Concerts inédits (Dreyfus, 1999)

With Laurent Korcia

- Danses (Naïve, 2004)
- Doubles jeux (Naïve, 2006)
- Laurent Korcia (Naïve, 2008)

With Musique Vivante

- Luciano Berio: Laborintus 2 per voci, strumenti e registrazione (Harmonia Mundi/Arcophon, 1969)
- Karlheinz Stockhausen: Aus den sieben Tagen (Harmonia Mundi/Arcophon, 1969)
- Pierre Boulez: Domaines (Harmonia Mundi, 1971)
- Vinko Globokar: Ausstrahlungen / Fluide / Atemstudie (BASF/Harmonia Mundi, 1972)

With others

- Susanne Abbuehl, Compass (ECM, 2006)
- Jean-Louis Agobet: Génération / Feuermann / Ritratto Concertante / Phonal with Orchestre philharmonique de Strasbourg (Timpani/Radio France, 2005)
- Gilbert Amy, Shin Anim Sha Ananim (Erato, 1987)
- Michel Béroff: The Five Piano Concertos / Overture on Hebrew Themes (EMI, 1988)
- Claude Bolling, Jazzgang Amadeus Mozart (Philips, 1965)
- Michel Colombier, Wings (A&M, 1971)
- Thomas Dutronc, Frenchy (Blue Note, 2020)
- Serge Gainsbourg, Gainsbourg Percussions (Philips, 1964)
- Jef Gilson, Enfin! (L'Échiquier, 1964)
- Jef Gilson, Jef Gilson à Gaveau (SFP, 1965)
- Michel Hausser, Holiday for Vibes and Cembalet (Columbia, 1964)
- Antoine Hervé, Road Movie (Nocturne, 2006)
- André Hodeir, Anna Livia Plurabelle (Philips, 1966)
- Daniel Humair, Quatre fois trois (Label Bleu, 1997)
- Mauricio Kagel, Exotica (Deutsche Grammophon, 1972)
- Gidon Kremer & Piazzolla, Hommage a Piazzolla (Nonesuch, 1996)
- Sylvain Luc, Joko (Dreyfus, 2006)
- Pierre Michelot, Round About a Bass (Mercury, 1963)
- Ibrahim Maalouf, 10 ans de Live! (Mi'ster, 2016)
- Sunny Murray, Sunny Murray (Shandar, 1971)
- Claude Nougaro, Claude Nougaro (Philips, 1966)
- Bernard Parmegiani, Pop'eclectic (Plate Lunch, 1999)
- Vincent Peirani, Thrill Box (ACT, 2013)
- Jean-Luc Ponty, Jazz Long Playing (Philips, 1964)
- Jean Luc Ponty and Daniel Humair, La Sorcellerie à travers les âges / Gravenstein (Communication, 1977)
- Raimon, Raimon (Fonomusic, 1992)
- Raimon, T'adones amic...? (Le Chant du Monde, 1974)
- Pascal Rogé, Chamber Music (Decca, 1989)
- Aldo Romano, Il Piacere (Owl, 1979)
- Alan Silva, Seasons (BYG, 1971)
- Jacky Terrasson, Gouache (Universal, 2012)
- Henri Texier, An Indian's Week (Label Bleu, 1993)
- François Tusques, Free Jazz (Mouloudji, 1965)
- Vienna Art Orchestra, All That Strauss (TCB, 2000)
- Miroslav Vitouš, Remembering Weather Report (ECM, 2009)
