= Éric Le Lann =

French jazz trumpeter (born 1957)

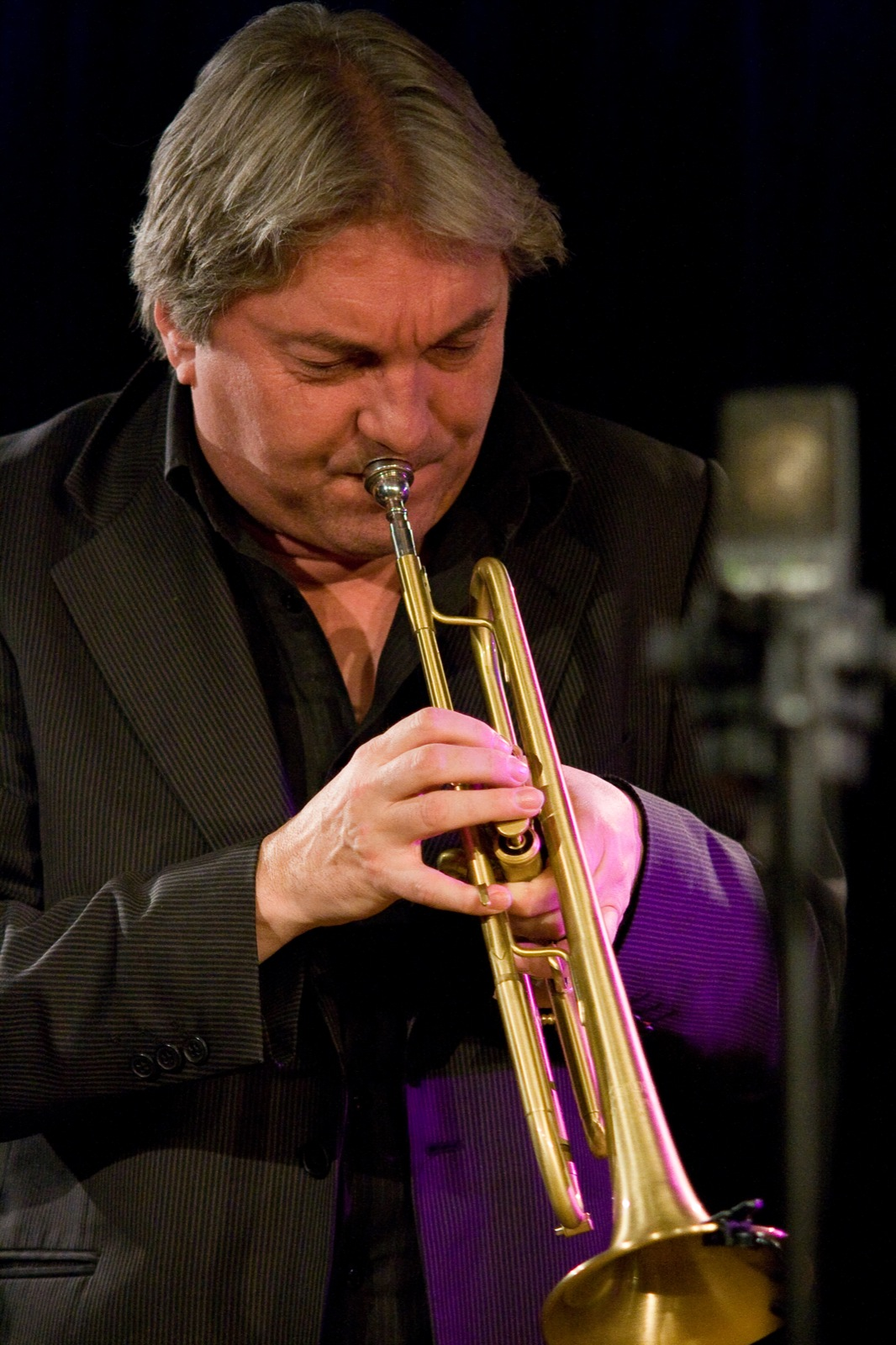

Background information
- Born: November 4, 1957 (age 67)
- Origin: Brittany, France
- Genres: Jazz
- Instruments: Trumpet

Éric Le Lann (born 1957 in Brittany) is a French jazz trumpeter.

He moved to Paris in 1977 where he had his professional debut and gained notice in 1980. He has worked with Aldo Romano, Henri Salvador, and others. He also did music for films including those of Bertrand Tavernier. In 2005 he and guitarist Jean-Marie Ecay did an album in tribute to Antonio Carlos Jobim. His daughter is French actress Lola Le Lann.
