= Claude Nougaro =

French jazz singer (1929–2004)

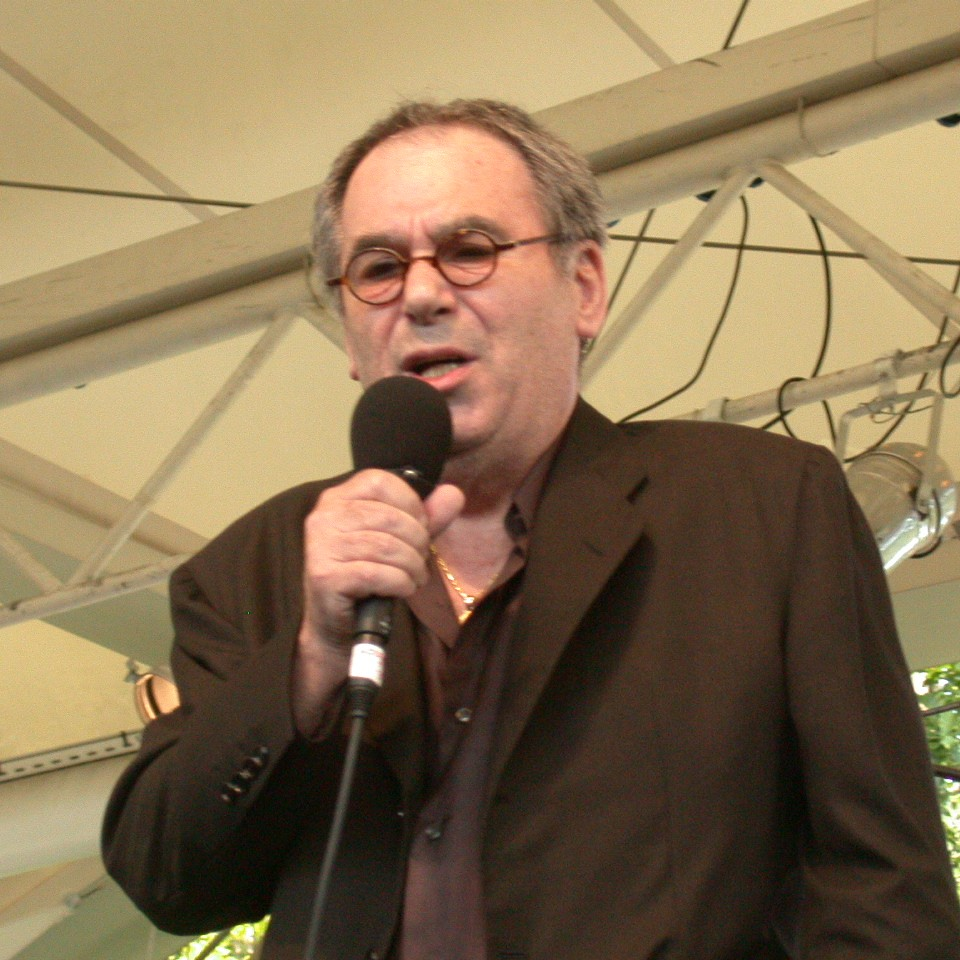
- At the Paris Jazz Festival, June 2003

Background information
- Born: 9 September 1929; Toulouse, Occitanie, France
- Died: 4 March 2004 (aged 74) Paris, France
- Genres: Jazz
- Occupations: Singer, poet, songwriter, painter
- Website: nougaro.com

Claude Nougaro (French pronunciation: [klod nuɡaʁo], Occitan: Claudi Nogaròu; 9 September 1929 – 4 March 2004) was a French jazz singer and poet.

== Life and career ==
Claude Nougaro was born on 9 September 1929 in Toulouse to a respected French opera singer, Pierre Nougaro, and a piano teacher, Liette Tellini. His maternal grandparents were Italian; his grandfather was born in Livorno, Tuscany and his grandmother in San Damiano d'Asti, Piedmont. He was raised by his grandparents in Toulouse where he heard Glenn Miller, Édith Piaf and Louis Armstrong (among others) on the radio. In 1947 he failed his baccalaureat and began a career in journalism, writing for various journals including Le Journal des Curistes at Vichy and L'Echo d'Alger. At the same time he wrote songs for Marcel Amont ("Le barbier de Belleville", "Le balayeur du roi") and Philippe Clay ("Joseph", "La sentinelle"). He met Georges Brassens, who became his friend and mentor.

In 1949, he performed his military service in the Foreign Legion at Rabat, Morocco.

He sent his lyrics to Marguerite Monnot, Édith Piaf's songwriter, who put them to music. ("Méphisto", "Le Sentier de la guerre"). He started to sing for a livelihood in 1959 in a Parisian cabaret in Montmartre, the Lapin Agile.

In 1962, he decided to sing his works himself: "Une petite fille" and "Cécile ma fille" (dedicated to his daughter, born in 1962, and to his wife Sylvie, whom he met at the Lapin Agile). These songs made him immediately known to a larger public, which he had already started to penetrate by participating in the concerts of Dalida. A car accident immobilised him for several months in 1963. The following year he travelled to Brazil, and sang in prestigious halls: the Olympia and the Théâtre de la Ville in Paris, and the Palais d'Hiver in Lyon. Following the death of his friend Jacques Audiberti in 1965 Nougaro wrote, in homage, the song "Chanson pour le maçon". The events of May 1968 inspired him to the torrential "Paris Mai", a plea for life, which would be banned from the airwaves. The same year he recorded his first live album at the Olympia: Une soirée avec Claude Nougaro.

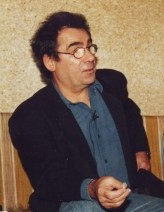
Nougaro in the 1980s

His career continued normally, punctuated by success: Le jazz et la java, Tu verras, Île de Ré, Armstrong, Toulouse, Petit taureau. But in 1984, his recording company did not renew his contract. Nougaro left for New York, seeking inspiration, and while there wrote and recorded a self-financed disc, Nougayork, whose resounding success was a surprise. In 1988 Victoires de la musique rewarded him with "best album" and "best artist", and between 1993 and 1997 he released three new albums.

His health deteriorated after 1995, when he underwent a heart operation. In 2003, his condition left him unable to appear at the Festival du Verbe at Toulouse. From 1998 to 2004 he devoted himself more to concerts and festivals, apart from an album in aid of children suffering from AIDS. Having undergone further surgery in early 2004, he died of cancer in March, at the age of 74.

== Discography ==
=== Studio albums ===
- 1958 : Claude Nougaro (President album)
- 1962 : Claude Nougaro
- 1964 : Claude Nougaro n°2
- 1966 : Bidonville
- 1967 : Petit taureau
- 1971 : Sœur âme
- 1973 : Locomotive d'or
- 1974 : Récréation
- 1975 : Femmes et famines
- 1976 : Plume d'ange
- 1978 : Tu verras
- 1980 : Assez !
- 1981 : Chansons nettes
- 1983 : Ami-chemin
- 1985 : Bleu blanc blues
- 1987 : Nougayork
- 1989 : Pacifique
- 1993 : Chansongs
- 1997 : L'Enfant phare
- 2000 : Embarquement immédiat

=== Live albums ===
- 1969 : Une soirée avec Claude Nougaro (L'Olympia, 2LP)
- 1977 : Nougaro 77 (L'Olympia, 2LP)
- 1979 : Nougaro 79
- 1982 : Au New Morning
- 1989 : Zénith made in Nougaro
- 1991 : Une voix dix doigts (2CD)
- 1995 : The best de scène (2CD)
- 1999 : Hombre et lumière (recorded in Toulouse, 2CD)
- 2002 : Au Théâtre des Champs-Elysées (2CD)

== Posthumous releases ==
- 2004 : La Note bleue
- 2008 : Claude Nougaro (album Président)

== Writings ==
- L'ivre de mots (2002)
- Fables de ma fontaine (2003)

Preceded by Johnny Hallyday	Victoires de la Musique; Male artist of the year 1988	Succeeded by Francis Cabrel
