= Henri Texier =

French jazz double bassist

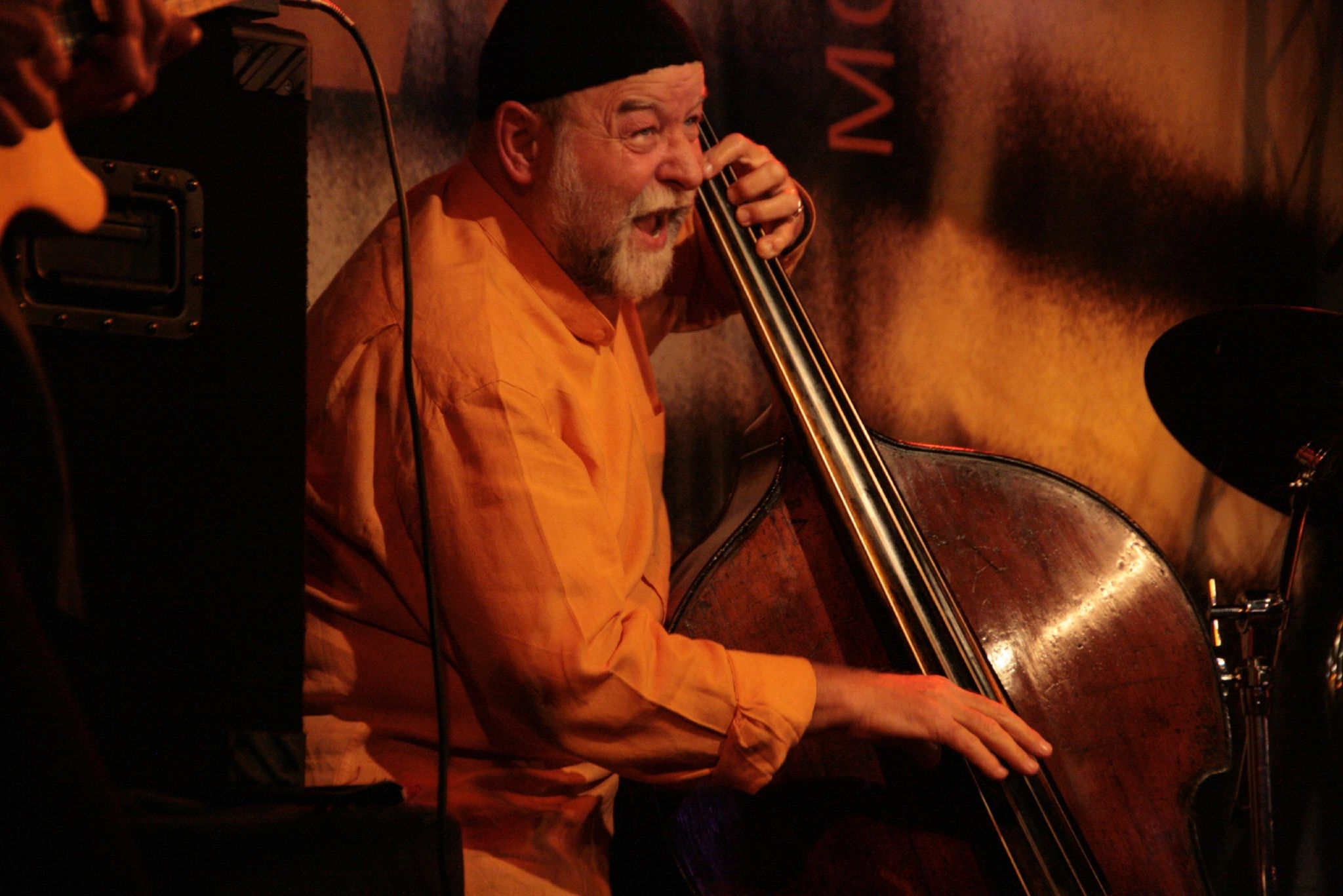

Background information
- Born: 27 January 1945 (age 81); Paris, France
- Genres: Jazz
- Occupation: Musician
- Instrument: Double bass
- Years active: 1960s-present

Henri Texier (French: [ɑ̃ʁi tɛksje]; born 27 January 1945) is a French jazz double bassist.

At the age of sixteen, fascinated by the double bass, Texier became a self-taught bassist, crediting Wilbur Ware most as an influence. He formed his first group with Georges Locatelli, Alain Tabar-Nouval, Jean-Max Albert, and Klaus Hagel, inspired by the music of Don Cherry and Ornette Coleman. In spite of an almost absence of recorded documents this group represents one of the first expressions of free jazz in France (1965).

From 1968 to 1972, Texier was a member of Phil Woods and his European Rhythm Machine, along with George Gruntz, Gordon Beck and Daniel Humair. Throughout the 1970s, Texier remained active in Europe on the jazz scene, performing with musicians such as John Abercrombie and Didier Lockwood, among others. In 1982, he formed a quartet with Louis Sclavis. With the trio Romano-Sclavis-Texier, he collaborated in three albums having for theme Africa as seen by the photographer Guy Le Querrec: Carnet de routes, Suite africaine and African Flashback.

== Discography ==
=== As leader ===
- Total Issue with Total Issue (United Artists, 1971)
- Amir (Eurodisc, 1976)
- Humair Jeanneau Texier (Owl, 1979)
- Varech (JMS, 1979)
- A Cordes et a Cris (JMS, 1979)
- Akagera with Daniel Humair, Francois Jeanneau (JMS, 1980)
- La Companera (Caratini, 1983)
- Paris-Batignolles with Joe Lovano (Label Bleu, 1986)
- Eric Barret/Aldo Romano/Henri Texier (Carlyne, 1988)
- Izlaz (Label Bleu, 1988)
- Colonel Skopje (Label Bleu, 1989)
- Up Date 3.3 with Daniel Humair, Francois Jeanneau (Label Bleu, 1990)
- The Scene Is Clean (Label Bleu, 1991)
- An Indian's Week (Label Bleu, 1993)
- Tresse with Pietro Tonolo, Aldo Romano (SplascH, 1993)
- Carnet de Routes with Romano Sclavis (Label Bleu, 1995)
- Respect (Label Bleu, 1997)
- Le Coffret JMS (JMS, 1998)
- Mosaic Man (Label Bleu, 1998)
- Carnet de Routes Suite African with Romano Sclavis (Label Bleu, 1999)
- Remparts D'Argile (Label Bleu, 2000)
- Strings' Spirit (Label Bleu, 2002)
- Mad Nomads (Label Bleu, 2002)
- Holy Lola (Normal, 2004)
- Vivre (Label Bleu, 2004)
- African Flashback with Romano Sclavis (Label Bleu, 2005)
- Alerte a L'Eau Water Alert (Label Bleu, 2006)
- Love Songs Reflexions (Label Bleu, 2008)
- Canto Negro (Label Bleu, 2011)
- 3+3 with Romano Sclavis (Label Bleu, 2012)
- At L'Improviste (Label Bleu, 2013)
- Sky Dancers (Label Bleu, 2016)
- Dakota Mab Live at Theater Gutersloh (Intuition, 2016)
- Sand Woman (Label Bleu, 2018)
- Chance (Label Bleu, 2020)
- Heteroklite Lockdown (Label Bleu, 2022)

=== As sideman ===
With Aldo Romano

- Just Jazz (Dreyfus, 2008)
- Complete Communion to Don Cherry (Dreyfus, 2010)
- Desireless (Musica Jazz 2010)
- Liberi Sumus Live Au Triton (Le Triton 2014)

With Randy Weston

- African Cookbook (Polydor, 1969)
- Niles Littlebig (Polydor, 1969)
- Randy Weston's African Rhythms (Comet, 2002)

With Phil Woods

- Alive and Well in Paris (Pathe, 1968)
- At the Montreux Jazz Festival (MGM, 1970)
- Phil Woods and His European Rhythm Machine (Pierre Cardin, 1970)
- At the Frankfurt Jazz Festival (Embryo, 1971)

With others

- Georges Arvanitas, Michel Graillier, Pianos Puzzle (Saravah, 1970)
- Claude Barthelemy, Jaune et Encore (Cobalt, 1979)
- Jean-Jacques Birge, Sarajevo Suite (L'Empreinte, 1994)
- Art Farmer, What Happens? (Campi, 1968)
- Claudio Fasoli, Ten Tributes (RAM, 1995)
- Claudio Fasoli, Trois Trios (SplascH, 1999)
- Jef Gilson, Enfin! (Club de L'Echiquier, 1963)
- Jef Gilson, Jean-Luc Ponty, OEil Vision (Club de L'Echiquier, 1964)
- Jimmy Gourley, Graffitti (Promophone, 1977)
- Michel Godard & Jean-Marc Padovani, Comedy (Big Noise, 1987)
- George Gruntz, 2001 Keys Piano Conclave (Atlantic, 1974)
- Henri Guedon, Afro Temple (Le Chant du Monde, 1984)
- Slide Hampton, Mellow-dy (LRC, 1992)
- Daniel Humair, Surrounded 1964 & 87 (Blue Flame, 1987)
- Francois Jeanneau, Ephemere (Owl, 1977)
- Francois Jeanneau, Terrains Vagues (Owl, 1983)
- Bill Keith, Bill Keith & Jim Collier (Hexagone 1979)
- Lee Konitz & Martial Solal, European Episode (Campi, 1969)
- Lee Konitz & Martial Solal, Impressive Rome (Campi, 1969)
- Guy Lafitte, Blues (Vega, 1969)
- Guy Lafitte, Blues in Summertime (RCA Victor, 1971)
- Julien Lourau, The Rise (Label Bleu, 2001)
- Joe Lovano, Worlds (Label Bleu, 1990)
- Colette Magny, Chansons Pour Titine (Le Chant du Monde, 1983)
- Colette Magny, Feu et Rythme & Un Juif a La Mer Un Palestinien Au Napalm (Scalen'Dis 1992)
- Patrice Meyer, Racines Croisees (Music'Al 1982)
- Patrice Meyer, Dromadaire Viennois (FMR, 1986)
- Jean-Marc Padovani, Demain Matin (Metro, 1983)
- Henri Renaud, Blue Cylinder (PSI, 1970)
- Catherine Ribeiro, Libertes? (Fontana, 1975)
- Larry Schneider, So Easy (Label Bleu, 1988)
- Hal Singer, Soul of Africa (Kindred Spirits, 2008)
- Martial Solal, Locomotion (PSI, 1974)
