= Paris Jazz Festival =

Jazz festival in France

Coordinates: 48.838°N 2.444°E

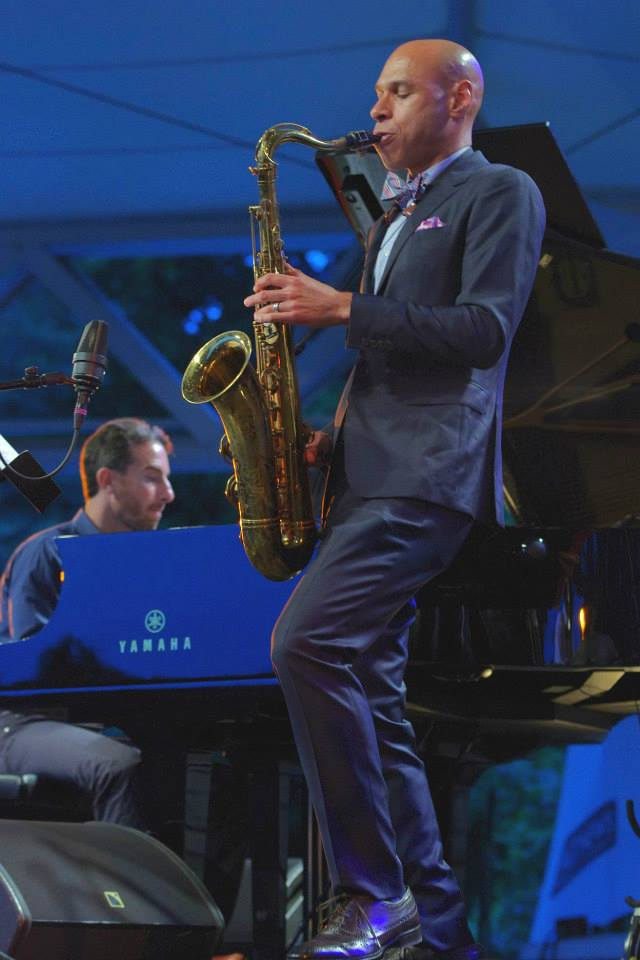
- Joshua Redman performing at the Paris Jazz Festival in 2014
- Genre: Jazz
- Dates: June–July
- Locations: Parc floral de Paris, Paris, France
- Years active: 1994–present
- Founders: Franck Marchal and Olivier Bastardie
- Attendance: 100,000
- Website: festivalsduparcfloral.paris

Paris Jazz Festival is a jazz festival in Paris, France, established in 1994.

== History ==
The Paris Jazz Festival was founded in the spring of 1994 by Franck Marchal and Olivier Bastardie. It was meant from the start to become a major event in the heart of Paris.

Initially known under the name À fleur de Jazz (a reference to its botanical garden setting, the festival rapidly met with a large popular success, obtaining the support of jazz aficionados and nature lovers. It featured the elite of international jazz, with performances by Didier Lockwood, Trilok Gurtu, Brad Mehldau, Lionel and Stéphane Belmondo, Richard Bona among others. Adopting the name Paris Jazz Festival in 1998, it gathered momentum on the occasion of the 1999 edition with the inauguration of the Delta, a covered outdoor stage with a seating capacity of 1,500 people, and standing capacity of 5,000.

It has been placed into the hands of different promoters since 2003:

- 2003–2005: François Peyratout and Reno Di Matteo (Nemo Productions)
- 2006-2008: Jean-Noël Ginibre (Loop Productions) and Enzo Sarin (Enzo Productions
- 2009-2014: Pierrette Devineau and Sebastian Danchin (CC Production)
- 2015 : Pierrette Devineau and Sebastian Danchin (CC Production) with Franck Marchal (Comptoir du Son)

== Editorial policy ==
The editorial policy of the Paris Jazz Festival has evolved over the years. At first featuring jazz artists traveling Europe on summer tours, it began centering its program on the promotion and influence of the French jazz scene since 2009. The Victoires du Jazz (the equivalent in France of the Grammy Awards) chose the Paris Jazz Festival in 2012 and 2014 as the official site for their annual ceremony. In 2013, the festival tested for the first time at a major event the Wave Field Synthesis system, a spatial audio rendering technique, characterized by the creation of virtual acoustic environments.

The Paris Jazz Festival is the flagship of the Musical Summer at Parc Floral, a global event including young audience festival Pestacles and classical music festival Classique au Vert. The Paris Jazz Festival opens its doors every Saturday and Sunday afternoon in June and July. Concerts, workshops, attractions and exhibitions are accessible free of charge, although a small entrance fee is required from park visitors.

Since 2011, night concerts have been taking place on specific weekends, in addition to the afternoon concerts. A second stage known as the Jazz Barge, set up on the park lake, has been offering additional concerts since 2012. The festival also includes in its program specific creations commissioned by the artistic management of the PJF. On the closing night of the 2013 edition, an original score, composed by Patrice Caratini and played by the 17-piece Caratini Jazz Ensemble, accompanied the screening of Body and Soul (1925), the silent masterpiece of African-American director Oscar Micheaux.

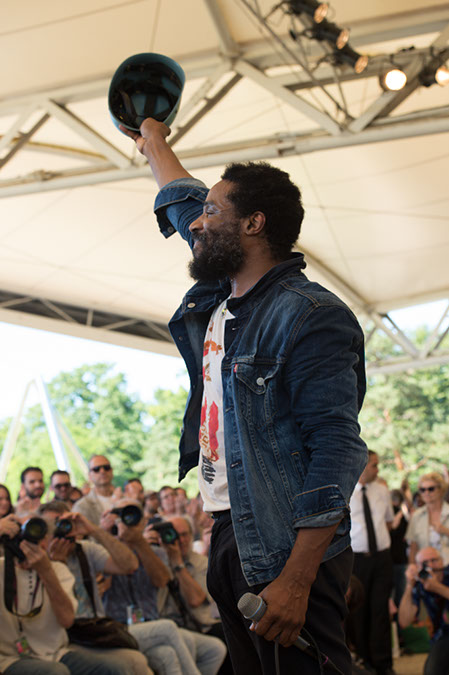
Cody Chesnutt at Paris Jazz Festival in 2014

== Performers ==
- 1994 Alain Bouchet, Belmondo Big Band, Belmondo Quintet, Sylvain Beuf, Emmanuel Bex, Boto & Novos Tempos, Carl Schlosser, Anne Ducros, Les Étoiles, Daniel Humair, Stéphane Kochoyan, Laborde Quartet, Didier Lockwood and Francis Lockwood, Meschinet Quartet, Daniel Mille, Naturel Quintet, Kim Parker, Olivier Ker Ourio, Verras/Barret/Benita/Romano, Vox Office
- 1995 African Project, Belmondo Quintet Pierre Blanchard, Bojan Z, André Ceccarelli, Richard Galliano, Michele Hendricks, Lokua Kanza, Rosa King & Upside Down, Biréli Lagrène, Didier Lockwood, Daniel Mille, Jean‐Jacques Milteau, Onztet de Violon Jazz, Pan à Paname, Michel Pellegrino, Prysm, Renaudin Groupe, Rhoda Scott, Jeffery Smith, Webetoys, Zoomtop Orchestra
- 1996 Stefano di Battista, Belmondo Quintet, Sylvain Beuf, Bex'tet, Andre Ceccarelli, Christian Escoudé, Galliano/Humair/Jenny-Clark, Simon Goubert, Antoine Hervé, Jean-Marc Jafet, Stephane Kochoyan, Éric Le Lann, Didier Lockwood, Julien Lourau Groove Gang, Daniel Mille, Naturel Quintet, Palatino (Romano/Benita/Fresu/Ferris), Le POM, Portal/Humair/Jenny-Clark, Bertrand Renaudin, Francois Theberge, Toukouleur (Claude Terranova), Patrick Verbeke, Barney Wilen
- 1997 David Sanchez, Leon Parker, Steve Wilson, Didier Lockwood, Antoine Hervé, Prysm, Joey Calderazzo/Sylvain Gagnon/Jeff Watts Trio, Martial Solal, Eric Watson, Enrico Pieranunzi, Philippe Le Baraillec, Paolo Fresu, Antonio Hart, Danilo Perez, Lorraine Desmarais, Laurent De Wilde, Bireli Lagrène, Henri Texier, Stefano Di Battista, Flavio Boltro, Erik Truffaz, Enrico Rava, Aldo Romano, Louis Winsberg, Brad Mehldau
- 1998 James Carter, Trilok Gurtu & The Glimpse, Brad Mehldau, Terence Blanchard, Dino Saluzzi, Marc Johnson, Mingus Big Band, Laurent De Wilde, Eddie Henderson, Michel Portal, Martial Solal, Didier Lockwood, Jack DeJohnette, Roy Haynes/John Patittuci/Danilo Perez, Kenny Garrett, Mike Stern, Helen Merrill, Aziza Mustapha Zadeh, Philip Catherine, Julien Lourau Groove Gang, Nana Vasconcelos, Daniel Humair, Romano/Sclavis/Texier, Bobo Stenson, Paul Motian Electric Be Bop Band
- 1999 Milt Jackson, Dee Dee Bridgewater, Franck Avitabile, Stefano Di Battista, Elvin Jones, Steps Ahead, Carla Bley, Dianne Reeves, Donald Brown, Johnny Griffin, Roy Hargrove, Michel Portal, Al Foster, Ahmad Jamal, Claude Bolling
- 2000 Joshua Redman, Jan Garbarek, Roy Hargrove, Charles Lloyd, Tom Harrell, Benny Golson, John Scofield, Dal Sasso/Belmondo, Trilok Gurtu, Jacky Terrasson, Steve Grossman, Michel Portal & Richard Galliano, Romano/Sclavis/Texier, Didier Lockwood, Courtney Pine, Paco Séry, Ray Barretto, Sphere, Lucky Peterson, Nicholas Payton, Monk Tentet, Fred Wesley, Rodney/Turner/Heering, Elvin Jones, Lizz Mac Comb, Erik Truffaz
- 2001 Claude Nougaro, Salif Keita, Rissell Malone, Cesária Évora, Olu Dara, Bugge Wesseltoft, Didier Lockwood, Marcio Faraco, Battista/Romano/Vitous, Tania Maria, Jean-Jacques Milteau, Mina Cinelu, Omara Portuondo, Art of the Quartet, Dee Dee Bridgewater, Chick Corea, Dave Brubeck, Wayne Shorter, Remember Shakti, Brecker Brothers, Laurent De Wilde, Maceo Parker
- 2002 Philip Catherine, Richard Galliano & Eddy Louiss, Sylvain Luc & Stéphane Belmondo, Joe Zawinul, Giovanni Mirabassi, Kenny Garrett, Bojan Z, Julien Lourau, Olivier Témime, Autour du Blues avec Francis Cabrel & Paul Personne, Claude Barthélémy, Michel Portal/Bernard Lubat/André Minvielle, David Linx & Diederik Wissels, Romano/Sclavis/Texier, Renaud Garcia-Fons, Bireli Lagrène, Médéric Collignon, Daniel Humair, Emmanuel Bex/Glenn Ferris/Simon Goubert, Didier Lockwood & Raghunat Manet, Stefano Di Battista, Jacky Terrasson, Khalil Chahine & Olivier Ker Ourio, Charles Lloyd, Stefano Bollani, Mingus Big Band, Christian Escoudé & Eric Le Lann, Scofield/Lovano/Holland/Foster, Baptiste Trotignon, Herbie Hancock/Michael Brecker/Roy Hargrove, Esbjorn Svensson Trio, Erik Truffaz, Didier Squiban, Dee Dee Bridgewater, Sylvain Bœuf, Aldo Romano, Denis Badault & Olivier Sens, NoJazz, Nathalie Loriers, Ray Barretto, Anne Ducros, Marcus Miller
- 2003 Benjamin Moussay, Aldo Romano, Louis Winsberg, Belmondo Hymne au Soleil, Toots Thielemans & Kenny Warner, Yves Robert, Louis Sclavis, Gérard Curbillon & Daniel Mille, Marcio Faraco, Strasax, Rabih Abou Khalil, Marc Ducret & Christophe Monniot, Delbecq Ambitronix, Trio Sud, Flavio Boltro, Wayne Shorter, Jean-Philippe Viret, Daniel Scannapieco, Joe Lovano & Richard Galliano, David El Malek, Dianne Reeves & Stefano Di Battista, Patrice Caratini, AJT Guitar Trio, Zimmerman/De Pourquery, Ceux Qui Marchent Debout, Bill Frisell, Susanne Abbuehl, Laurent De Wilde, Stéphane Huchard, Norbert Lucarain, Cubanismo
- 2004 Xavier Richardeau, Stacey Kent, Paolo Fresu & Dhafer Youssef, Bugge Wesseltof, Baptiste Trotignon, Enrico Rava, Jean-Michel Pilc, François Dumont d'Ayot, Kurt Elling, Mirabassi/Ferris/Boltro, André "Dédé" Ceccarelli, Gabor Gado Group, Erik Truffaz, Emler/Tchamitchian/Echampard, Fred Pallem & Friendz, Stephan Oliva Quintet, Vienna Art Orchestra, Pierre de Bethmann, Michael Brecker, Jason Moran, Kurt Rosenwinkel, Joshua Redman & Brad Mehldau, Como "Scenario", Esbjorn Svensson Trio, Amp Fiddler, Magic Malik, Moutin Reunion Quartet, Abbey Lincoln, Bojan Z, Chris Potter, Christophe Wallemme, Orquesta Aragon
- 2005 Daby Touré, Rokia Traoré, Marcia Maria, Tania Maria Viva Brasil Quartet, Laurent Coq Trio, Nguyên Lê, Alain Jean-Marie/Henri Texier/Aldo Romano, Henri Texier Strada Sextet, Olivier Témime, Django Bates Human Chain (guest: Josefine Lindstrand), Guillaume de Chassy/Daniel Yvinec/André Minvielle, Brussels Jazz Orchestra ft Philip Catherine & Bert Joris, Stefan Orins, Le Grand Orchestre de Tango de Juan Jose Mosalini, Las Ondas Marteles, Julien Lourau, Sara Lazarus, Steps Ahead ft Michael Brecker, Mike Mainieri, Mike Stern, Richard Bona, Steve Smith, Pierrick Pédron, Stefano Di Battista, The Bad Plus, Brian Blade, Omar Sosa, Jimmy Bosch ft Mercadonegro Orchestra, Elisabeth Kontomanou, Madeleine Peyroux, Eric Bibb, Terry Callier, Stéphane Belmondo, Hermeto Pascoal, Goran Kafjes, Nils Petter Molvaer
- 2006 Musica Nuda, Stacey Kent, Mina Agossi, Curtis Stigers, Vinicius Cantuaria, Susheela Raman, Mario Canonge, Sixun, Jean-Philippe Viret, Avishai Cohen, Benjamin Moussay, Eric Legnini, NoJazz, Roy Hargrove RH Factor, Captain Mercier, Soul Survivors, Patrick Verbeke, Jean-Jacques Milteau, Kenny Wayne, Buddy Guy, Misja Fitzgerald-Michel, Sangam feat Charles Lloyd, Nicolas Genest, Tuck & Patti, Charlier-Sourisse Quartet, Sarah Morrow, Bojan Z, Kenny Garrett, Belmondo & Yusef Lateef Sextet, Ahmad Jamal, Richard Galliano, Hamilton de Holanda, Didier Lockwood
- 2007 Tony & Mizikopéyi Big Band, Christophe Del Sasso Big Band, ONJ Electrique, Hurlak, Thomas Dutronc, Boulou et Elios Ferré, Christian Escoudé, Faya Dub, Richard Bona, Tigrand Hamasyan, Rabih Abou Khalil, Brice Martin, Philippe Catherine, Stéphane Guillaume, Toku, Sophie Alour, Franck Amsallem, Jef Nive, Pierre de Bethmann, Giovanni Mirabassi, Gerri Allen, Ricky Ford, Dave Holland, Kurt Rosenwinkel, Conrad Herwig, Brian Lynch, Denis Colin, Diane Schuur, Robin McKelle, Joe Sample, Randy Crawford, Daniel Humair, Wynton Marsalis, Chucho Valdes
- 2008 Ji Mob, Erik Truffaz, Zuco 103, Caravan Palace, Oddarrang, Jim Tenor & Kabu Kabu, Skakcsi Trio & Tony Lakatos, Tomasz Stanko, Armenia Folk Quintet, Jef Lee Johnson, Henri Texier, Stéphane Kochoyan, Romane, Niño Josele, Son of Dave, James Taylor, New Master Sounds, Martha High & Shaolin Temple Defenders, Take the Coltrane Quartet, Al Foster feat Steve Grossman, Donald Brown & Bill Mobley, Wallace Roney, Tumi and the Volume, Mayra Andrade, Sing for Freedom, Angélique Kidjo, Raul Midon, Dianne Reeves, SF Jazz Collective, Steve Coleman, David Murray, Stefano Di Battista
- 2009 Guillaume Orti, Robin Verheyen, Bill Carrothers, Maria Schneider, Brussels Jazz Orchestra, Diederik Wissels, Octurn, Sam Tschabalala, Wasis Diop, Stéphane Huchard, Ablaye & the Links, Cheick Tidiane Seck, Gianluca Petrella, Rita Marcitulli, Antonello Salis, Fabrizio Bosso, Open Gate Trio (Bearzatti, Gouvert, Bex), Musica Nuda, Roland Tchakounté, Joe Louis Walker, Phil Reptil, Jean-Jacques Milteau, Médéric Collignon, Vienna Art Orchestra, Radio String Quartet, Jean-Christophe Cholet, Costel Nitescu, Bojan Z, Bireli Lagrène, Kocani Orkestar, Vincent Courtois, Alban Darche et le Gros Cube, Émile Parisien, Jean-Marie Machado, Jean-Philippe Viret, Richard Galliano avec Richard Bona, Gonzalo Rubalcada et Clarence Penn, Bumcello feat Nathalié Natiembé, Erik Truffaz feat Christophe
- 2010 Jonas Knutsson, Mathilde Renault, Niels Petter Molvaer, Jan Garbarek, Edouard Ferlet, Airelle Besson, Fabrice Moreau, Anne Paceo, Géraldine Laurent, DAG Trio (Domancich, Avenel, Goubert), Carine Bonnefoy New Large Ensemble, Harrison Kennedy, N'Dambi, Amar Sundy, Eric Bibb, Das Kapital, Joachim Kühn, Hyperactive Kid, Alexander Von Schlippenbach, Aki Takase, Louis Sclavis, Andy Emler, Thomas de Pourquery, Bernard Lubat, Youn Sun Nah, Ulf Wakenius, David Linx, Maria Joao, Zohar Fresco, Hagiga, David El-Malek, les élèves du Conservatoire Edward Saïd de Ramallah, Oriental Music Ensemble, Anouar Brahem, Anthony Joseph, The Z Syndicate, Sandra Nkaké, Richard Bona, Daniel Goyonne, Isabelle Olivier, Christophe Monniot, Enrico Pieranunzi, Richard Galliano
- 2011 Thomas Enhco, Yaron Herman, Benjamin Moussay, Bojan Z, Michel Portal, Charlier-Sourisse Quartet, Push Up, Ceux Qui Marchent Debout, Sly Johnson, Damiano – Sarzier – Risso, Fred Pallem & le Sacre du Tympan, Surnatural Orchestra, Ping Machine, Stéphane Guillaume, Andy Emler, Eddy Louiss, Gutbucket, Mighty Mo Rodgers, Daniel Mille, Trilok Gurtu, Yves Rousseau, Isabelle Olivier, Tania Maria, Youn Sun Nah, Renaud Garcia Fons, David Murray, Harold Lopez-Nussa, Omar Sosa, Gaïa Cuatro, Ballaké Sissoko, Vincent Segal, Jean-Philippe Viret, Antoine Hervé
- 2012 Daniel Humair, Jean-François Zygel, Jacques Gamblin et Laurent De Wilde Sextet, Hadouk Trio, Gueorgui Kornazov/Codjia/Tamisier, Bireli Lagrène, Enrico Rava, Airelle Besson & Nelson Veras, Ibrahim Maalouf, Musiques à Ouïr, Régis Huby & Maria-Laura Baccarini, Lisa Simone, Gregory Porter, Maceo Parker, Oxmo Puccino, Yom, Alain Jean-Marie, Leïka, Stéphane Belmondo, Laurent Dehors, Keb' Mo', Eric Legnini & Hugh Coltman, Maryse Ngalula & Jean-Rémy Guédon, Mulatu Astatke, Eric Seva, Chloé Cailleton, Edouard Ferlet, Orchestre National du Jazz, Oihana, Lisa Doby, Keith B Brown, Xavier Dessandre-Navarre
- 2013 Mozdzer/Danielsson/Fresco, Yom, Stéphane Galland, Guillaume Perret, Céline Bonacina, Elina Duni, Malted Milk, Milteau/Galvin/Robinson/Smyth, Mouton Réunion Quartet, Manu Katché, Edmar Castañeda, Roberto Fonseca, Flora Théfaine, Trombone Shorty, Marcus Wyatt, Hugh Masakela, Quai N° 5, Francesco Bearzatti, Patrice Caratini Jazz Ensemble, Big Daddy Wilson, Patrice Héral, Yilian Cañizares, Blue Gene, Pierrick Pédron, Sofie Sörman & Armel Dupas, Marcel & Solange, Mathis Haug, Kumquat, Hugues Mayot, Didier Ithursarry & Kristof Hiriart, Smadj
- 2014 Colin Vallon, Paolo Fresu, Franck Tortiller, Didier Lockwood, Thierry Eliez, André Ceccarelli, David Enhco, Kamilya Jubran & Sarah Murcia, François Thuillier, Viret/Séva/Godard, Kyle Eastwood, Cody Chestnutt, Zalindé, Ablaye Cissoko & Volker Goetze, Manu Dibango, Mark Eliyahu, Bombay Offshore, Slime, Snarky Puppy, Daniel Mille & Sylvain Luc, Olivier Ker Ourio & L'Orkès Péï, Sébastien Boisseau & Mathieu Donarier, Pierre de Bethmann, Marc Ducret, Théo Ceccaldi, Didier Levallet, Tigran Hamasyan, Debademba, Mondogift, Faada Freddy, Fatoumata Diawara & Roberto Fonseca, Ensemble Art Sonic, Jean-Charles Richard, Émile Parisien & Vincent Peirani, Joshua Redman
