= Alain Jouffroy =

French writer and poet

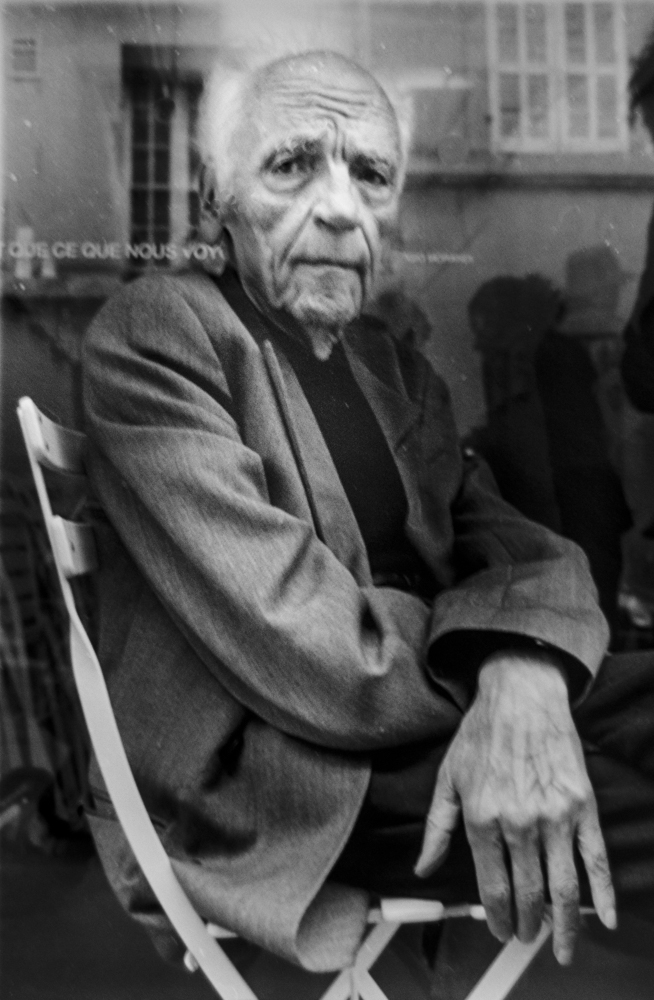
- Alain Jouffroy in April 2010
- Born: 11 September 1928; Near Parc Montsouris, Paris, France
- Died: 20 December 2015 (aged 87); Paris, France
- Occupations: Poet, writer
- Writing career
- Notable awards: Prix Goncourt 2007

Alain Jouffroy (11 September 1928 – 20 December 2015) was a French writer, poet and artist.

Jouffroy was born near Parc Montsouris, Paris. He was the first advocate of an Art Strike and formed the L'Union des Ecrivains during the strikes of May 1968 in France with Jean-Pierre Faye. He was also a great influence on the Zanzibar Group—part of the French new wave who took part in the Paris demonstrations at this time.

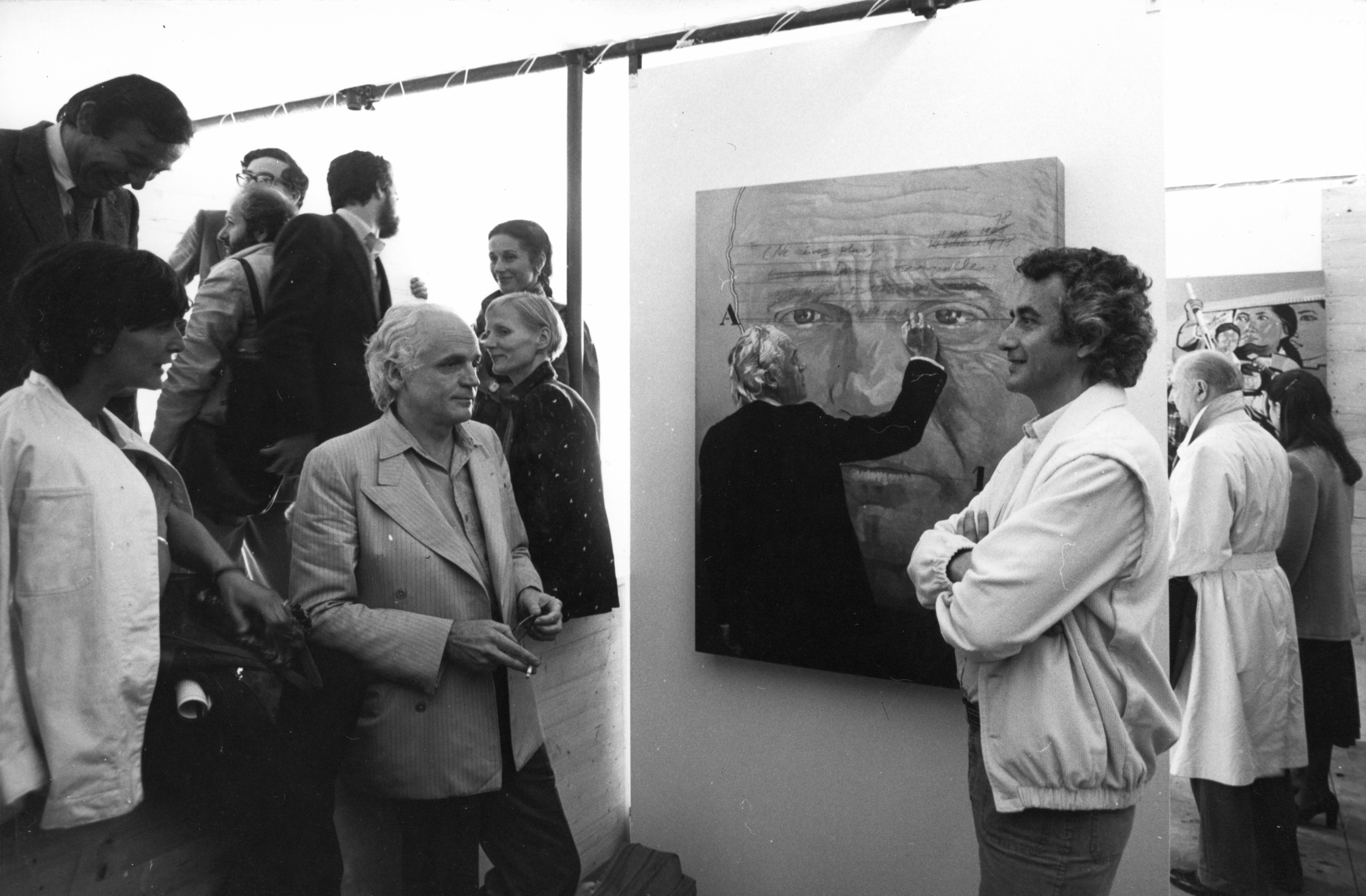
Alain Jouffroy and Herman Braun-Vega at the 39th Venice Biennalein 1980.

He won the Prix Goncourt for poetry in 2007.

== Filmography ==
Year	Title	Role	Notes
1967	La collectionneuse	Writer	
1968	Fun and Games for Everyone		
1969	Détruisez-vous		(final film role)
