= Music in Paris =

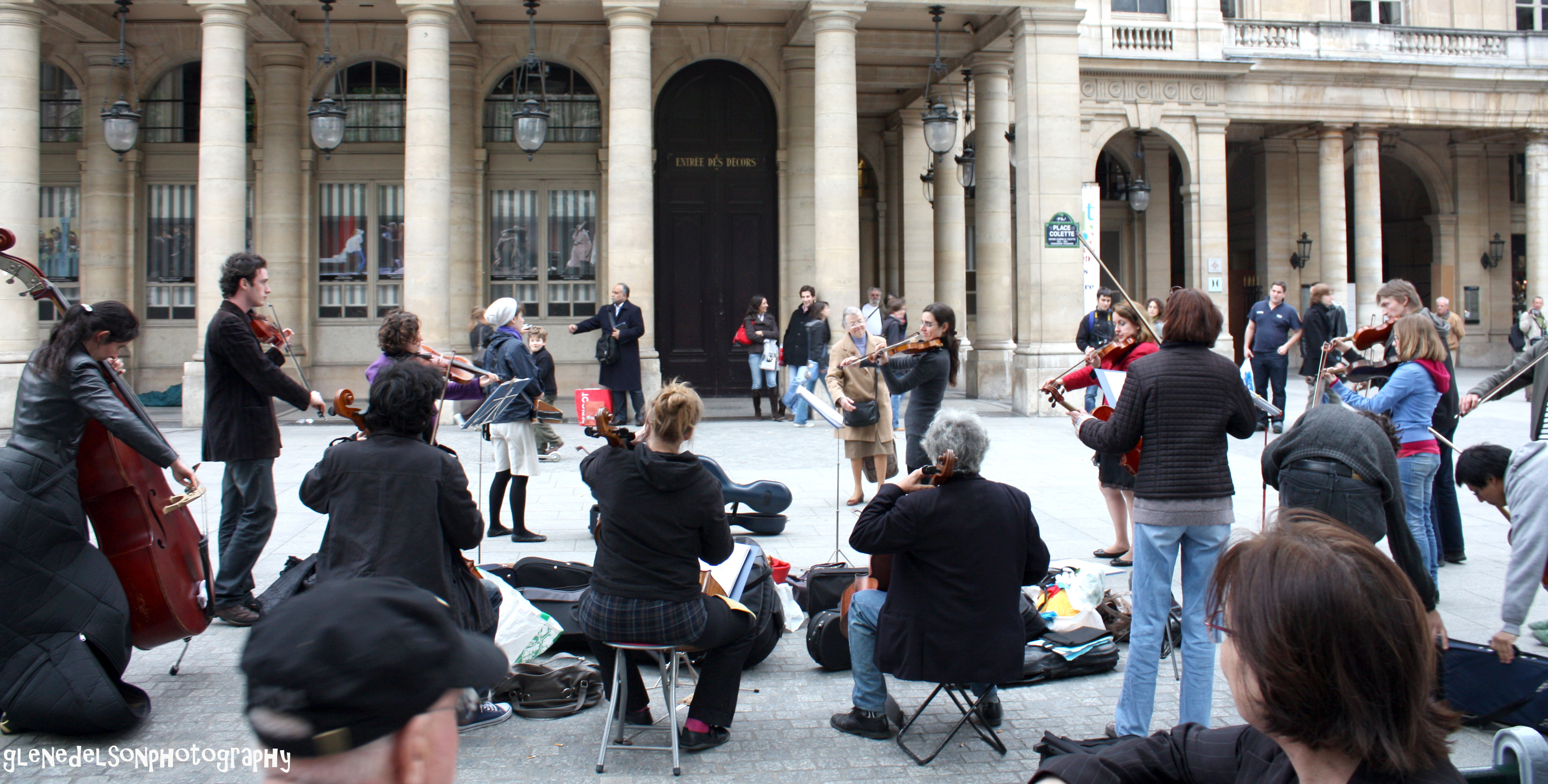
Music school students play on a Paris square

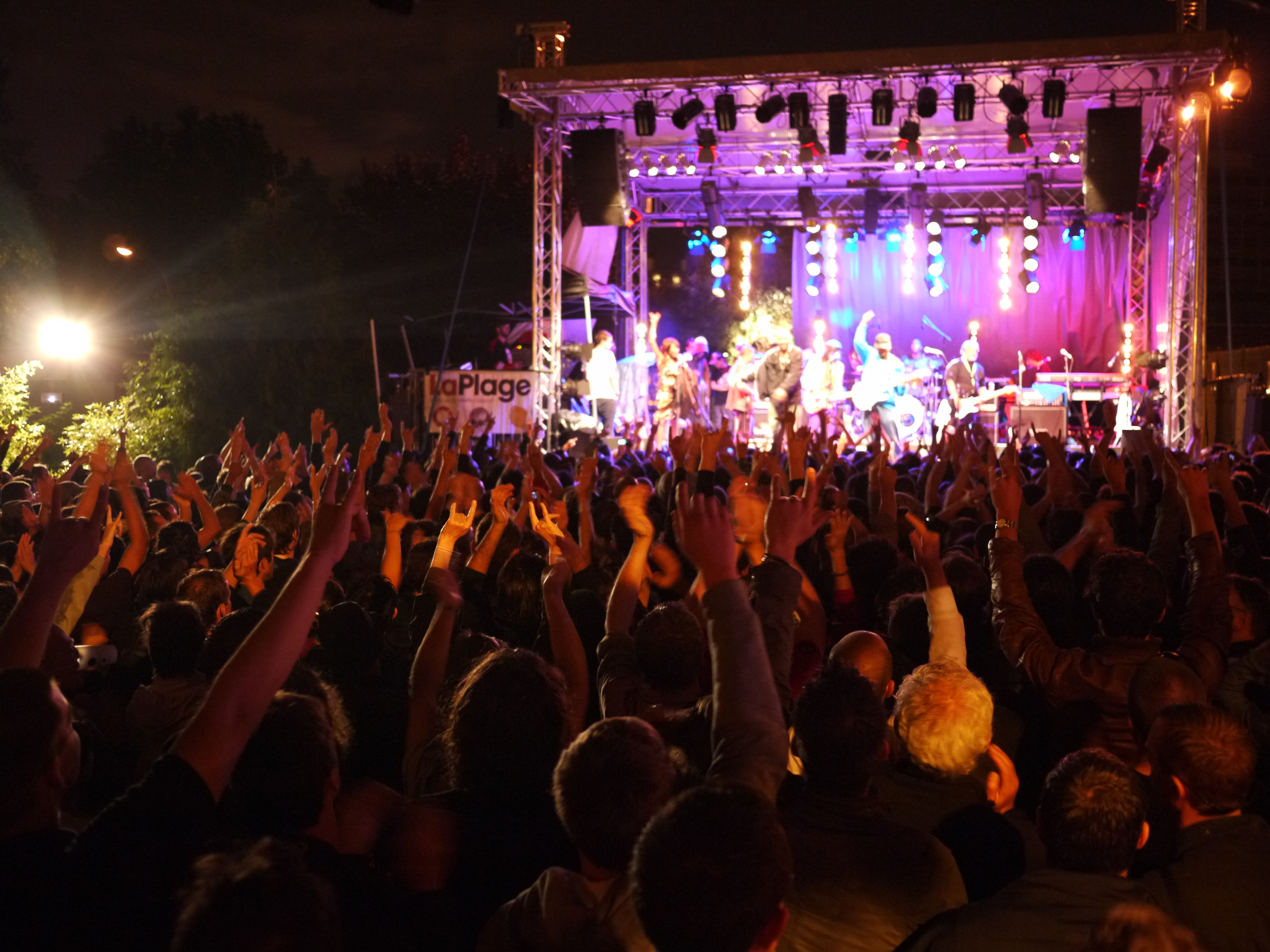
Concert at a Paris club, LaPlage de Glazart

Music in the city of Paris, France, includes a variety of genres, from opera and symphonic music to musical theater, jazz, rock, rap, hip-hop, the traditional Bal-musette and gypsy jazz, and every variety of world music, particularly music from Africa and North Africa. such as the Algerian-born music known as Raï. Leading musical institutions include the Paris Opera, the Orchestre de Paris, and the Paris Conservatory, the first state music conservatory in Europe. The Cité de la Musique at La Villette is home of the new Paris Symphony Hall, the Conservatory, a museum of musical instruments, and Le Zenith, a major venue for popular music. Many of the churches in Paris have magnificent historic organs, and often host concerts. The city is also known for its music halls and clubs.

== Paris Opera ==
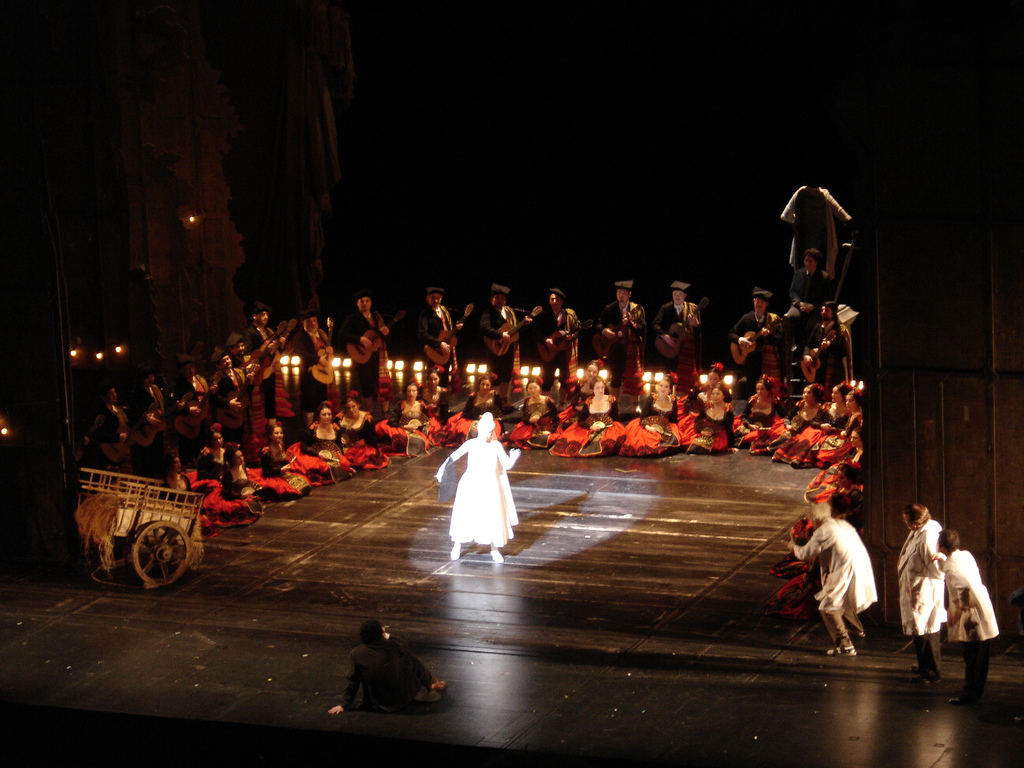
A performance of Tales of Hoffmann at the Opera Bastille (2007)

The Paris Opera, officially called the Opéra National de Paris founded in 1669, is the oldest and most famous opera company of France. It mainly produces operas at its modern 2700-seat theatre Opéra Bastille which opened in 1989, and ballets and some classical operas at the older 1970-seat Palais Garnier which opened in 1875. Small scale and contemporary works are also staged in the 500-seat Amphitheatre under the Opéra Bastille. The company's annual budget is in the order of 200 million euros, of which 100 million come from the French state and 70 million from box office receipts. With this money, the company runs the two houses and supports a large permanent staff, which includes the orchestra of 170, a chorus of 110 and the corps de ballet of 150. Each year, the Opéra presents about 380 performances of opera, ballet and other concerts, to a total audience of about 800,000 people (of whom 17% come from abroad), which is a very good average seat occupancy rate of 94%. In the 2012–13 season, the Opéra presented 18 opera titles (two in a double bill), 13 ballets, 5 symphonic concerts and two vocal recitals, plus 15 other programmes. The company's training bodies are also active, with 7 concerts from the Atelier Lyrique and 4 programmes from the École de Danse.

== Paris Opera Ballet ==
The Paris Opera Ballet (French: Ballet de l'Opéra de Paris) is the oldest national ballet company in the world, founded in 1669, just after the Opera; and many European and international ballet companies, can trace their origins to it. Many famous romantic ballets, including Giselle and Le Corsaire, were first danced by the Paris Opera company. The Paris Opera has had many different official names during its long history but since 1994 has been called the Opéra National de Paris (Paris National Opera). The company presents ballet primarily at the Palais Garnier. The director of the Paris Opera Ballet until his resignation in February 2016 was Benjamin Millepied.

== Orchestre de Paris ==
The stage of the Philharmonie de Paris at La Villette, main venue of the Orchestre de Paris

The Orchestre de Paris was established in 1967, following the dissolution of the Orchestre de la Société des Concerts du Conservatoire, when conductor Charles Munch was called on by the Minister of Culture, André Malraux to create a new orchestra in Paris. Previous musical directors included and Herbert von Karajan was hired as an interim music advisor from 1969 to 1971. Later musical directors music include Sir Georg Solti, Daniel Barenboim, and Semyon Bychkov.

The main venue of the Orchestre de Paris is the Philharmonie de Paris in the Cité de la Musique, in the Parc de la Villette in the 19th arrondissement. The hall, designed by Jean Nouvel, was inaugurated in 2015. The orchestra has 119 musicians, and will be giving fifty concerts during the 2015–2016 season. The musical director since 2010 is Paavo Järvi. He will be replaced in September 2016 by Daniel Harding.

== Classical music and dance ==
Paris has several other important orchestras and venues for classical music and dance. The Lamoureux Orchestra, officially known as the Société des Nouveaux-Concerts, founded by Claude Lamoureux in 1881, has had an illustrious role in Paris music. It gave the first performances of Claude Debussy's Nocturnes (1900 and 1901) and La mer (1905). The current artistic director is Pierre Thilloy, and it performs both classical and new works. Performances are held at the Théâtre du Châtelet, the Théâtre des Champs-Élysées, and sometimes at the Grand Rex movie theater, an art deco landmark in the city.

Radio France is the home of two professional symphony orchestras. The Orchestre National de France, founded in 1934, specializes in French music and tours frequently abroad. It plays regularly at the Théâtre des Champs-Élysées, and its concerts are broadcast on French national radio. Its music director since 2008 is Daniele Gatti.

The Orchestre Philharmonique de Radio France, founded in 1937, performs both contemporary and classical music. It has 141 members, and performs at the auditorium of the Maison de la Radio France. Its musical director is Mikko Franck. Its concerts are broadcast on radio and television throughout Europe. Radio France also has a choral group, the Choeur de Radio France, the only professional symphonic choir in France, which performs classical, traditional and modern choral works, and also broadcasts regularly on French radio and TV. It is directed by Sofi Jeannin.

The Salle Pleyel is another important concert venue for classical music. It was home of the Orchestre de Paris until 2015.

== Cité de la Musique ==
The Cité de la Musique (City of Music), is a complex of musical institutions that was created beginning in the 1990s in the Parc de la Villette in, the 19th arrondissement, a former industrial area near the edge of the city. The project was conceived by President François Mitterrand as a means to create a new cultural center in a working-class neighborhood outside the city center. It was designed by the architect Christian de Portzamparc and opened in 1995. The Paris Conservatory of Music was transferred there in September 1990. and a large hall for rock concerts and other events, Le Zenith, was opened in . The jewel of the ensemble, the Philharmonie de Paris, the home of the Orchestre de Paris, designed by architect Jean Nouvel, was inaugurated in 2015.

== Music in the cathedral and churches ==
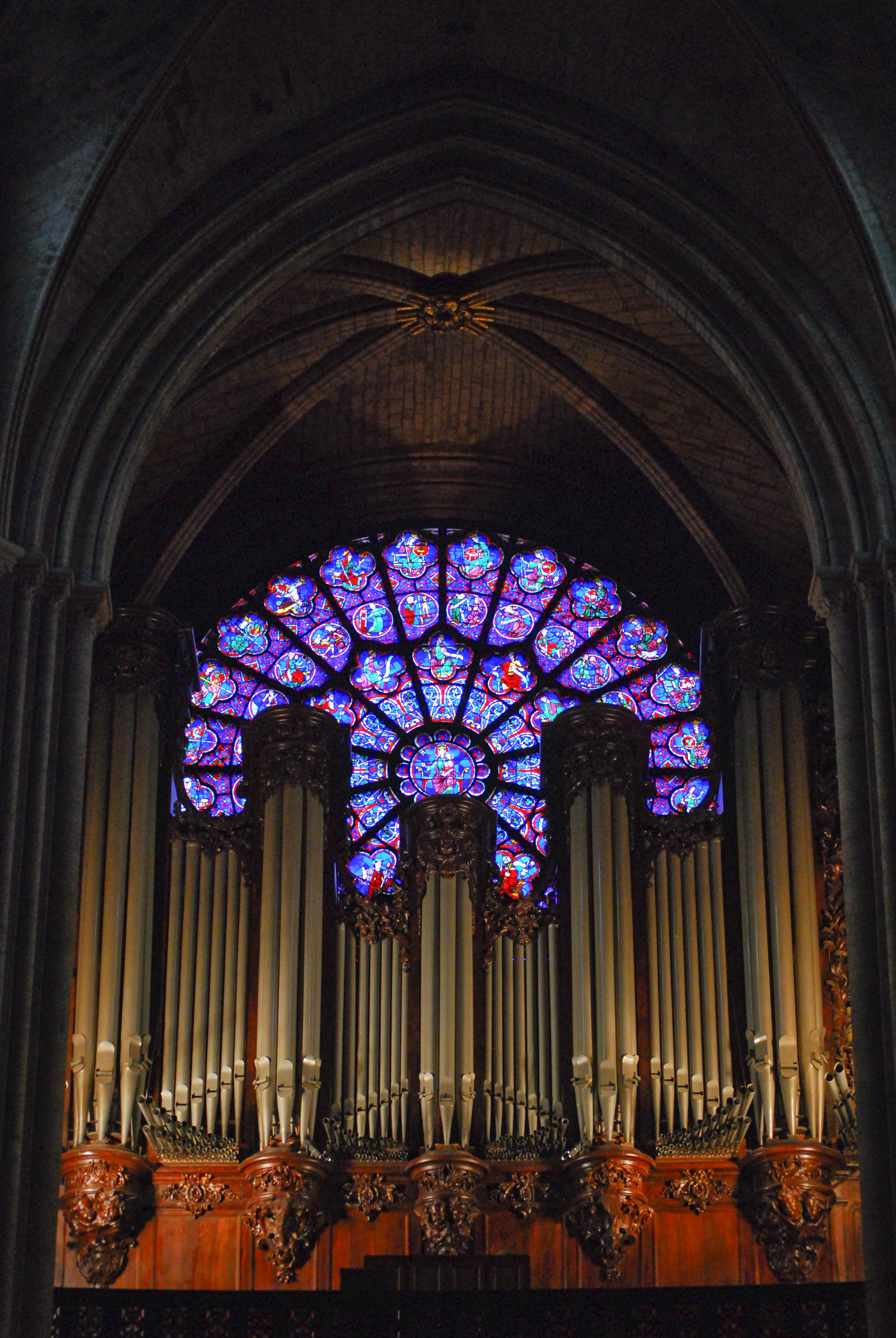
The organ of the Cathedral of Notre-Dame de Paris

The most famous organ in Paris is that of the Cathedral of Notre-Dame de Paris. It was made in the 18th century by the noted builder François-Henri Clicquot. Some of Clicquot's original pipework in the pedal division continues to sound from the organ today. The organ was almost completely rebuilt and expanded in the 19th century by Aristide Cavaillé-Coll.

The position of titular organist ("head" or "chief" organist) at Notre-Dame is one of the most prestigious organist posts in France, along with the post of titular organist of Saint Sulpice in Paris, Cavaillé-Coll's largest instrument.

The organ has 7,374 pipes, with ca 900 classified as historical. It has 110 real stops, five 56-key manuals and a 32-key pedalboard. In December 1992, a two-year restoration of the organ was completed that fully computerized the organ under three LANs (Local Area Networks). The restoration also included a number of additions, notably two further horizontal reed stops en chamade in the Cavaille-Coll style. The Notre-Dame organ is therefore unique in France in having five fully independent reed stops en chamade.

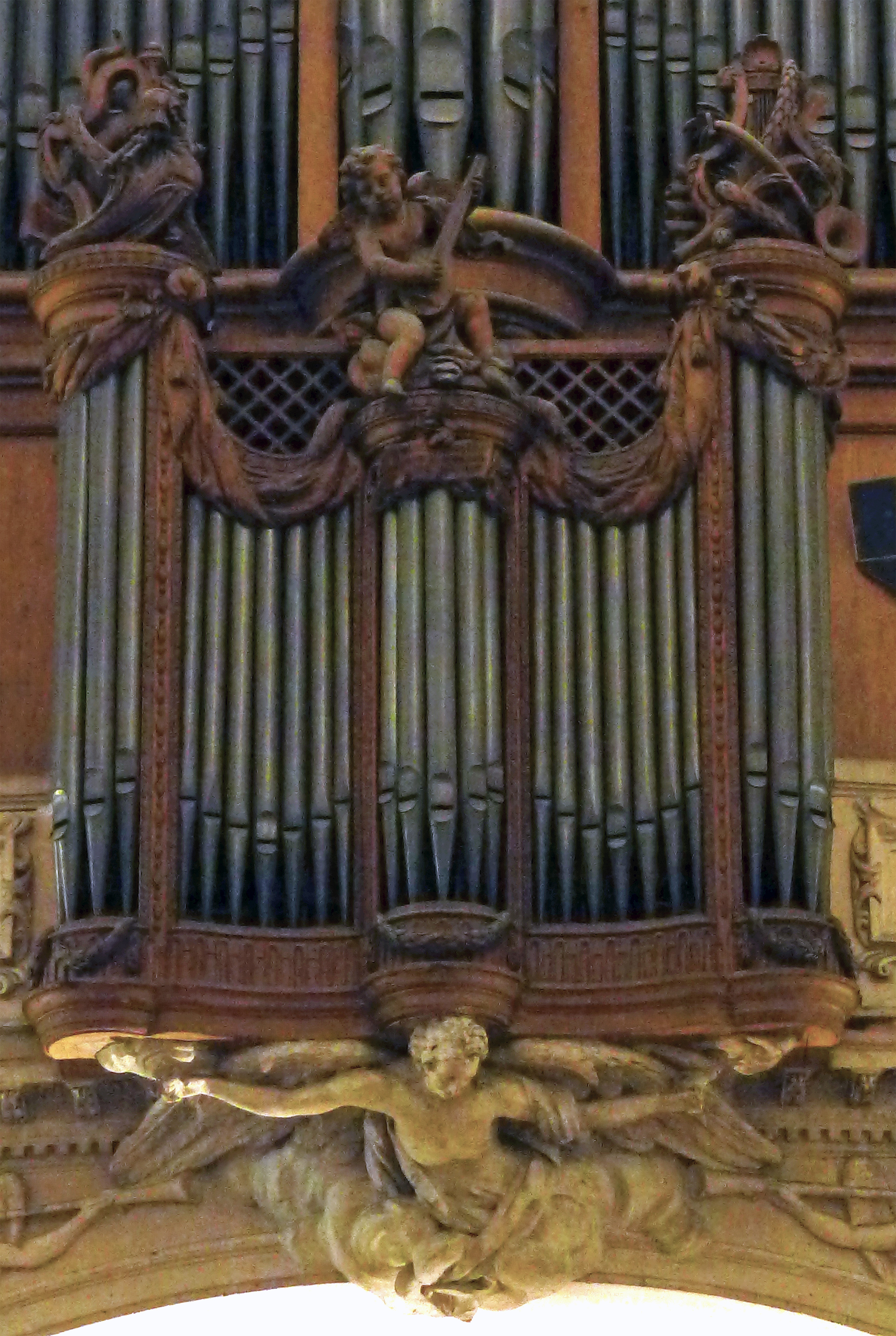
The organ of the church of St-Gervais-et-St-Protais, played by generations of the Couperin family

The church of St-Gervais-et-St-Protais is one of the great shrines of organ music, thanks to the Couperin family; eight members of the family were organists there from 1656 until 1826. They included Louis Couperin (1626-1661), and François Couperin (1668-1733) authors of celebrated masses and other compositions for the instrument. The grand organ of Couperin is still in place on the Tribune above the entrance at the back of the church. The first organ was constructed by Mathis Languhedul of Flanders in 1601; followed by new organ made by the French dynasty of Pierre, Alexandre and François Thierry, between 1649 and 1714; then rebuilt by François-Henri Cliquot in 1769, with many restorations over the following years. The organ itself is a registered historic landmark.

Another well-known organ in Paris is the organ of the American Cathedral in Paris on Avenue George V. Built in 1887 by the prestigious French firm Aristide Cavaillé-Coll, it was inaugurated on October 5, 1887, by Alexandre Guilmant. It has been suggested that Marcel Dupré is the person most responsible for the evolution of the instrument, which is still one of the largest in Paris: it was Dupré who acted as consultant, first in 1922, again in 1930, then again in the 1950s, with Maurice Duruflé. The latest restoration was completed in 1993 by the organ firm of Bernard Dargassies with the generous support of the Paulé Foundation and other Cathedral members. The organ was re-dedicated on February 21, 1993, and re-inaugurated on May 18, 1993, by Marie-Madeleine Duruflé, and on May 30, 1993, by Marilyn Keiser.

African-American gospel musicians are well known in Paris and some of them have taken permanent residence here.

Many churches in Paris host free concerts on Sunday afternoons. A few well-known examples include the Sunday "Les Dimanches Musicaux" concerts at the American Cathedral in Paris, an English speaking church located on Avenue George V, and similar programs at other churches around Paris including La Madeleine.

== The Opéra-Comique ==
Founded in 1753, the Opéra-Comique theater hosted the first performances of Bizet's Carmen and of Pelléas et Mélisande by Claude Debussy, and the French premieres of the operas of Puccini. In more recent times, the theater went through economic difficulties, and the permanent company was disbanded in 1972, but the theater continues to present productions by several companies of classical and new works of opera and musical theater. The building was closed in 2015 for eighteen months of extensive renovations, and again in 2026 for a year of renovations.

== Musical theater ==
Musical theater became very popular in Paris in the mid-19th century, largely because of the witty and well-crafted musical works of Jacques Offenbach, but the genre nearly disappeared in the 20th century, due in large part to high costs and to competition from motion pictures. In the 1980s and 1990s, Paris reversed the trend hosted the premieres of two mega-musicals, Les Miserables, based on the novel by Victor Hugo, with music by Claude-Michel Schönberg and original French lyrics by Alain Boublil and Jean-Marc Natel, opened in Paris in 1980, and Notre Dame de Paris, also based on a novel by Victor Hugo, with music composed by Riccardo Cocciante and lyrics by Luc Plamondon, which opened on September 16, 1998. Both musicals started in Paris and went on to success in London, New York and around the world.

Today the main venue for musicals is the Théatre du Châtelet, which regularly brings Broadway musicals from New York to Paris. In 2015, the musical An American in Paris was previewed first at the Chatelet before going to New York for a successful run. The theater is presenting Passion by Stephen Sondheim in its 2016 season

== Music halls ==
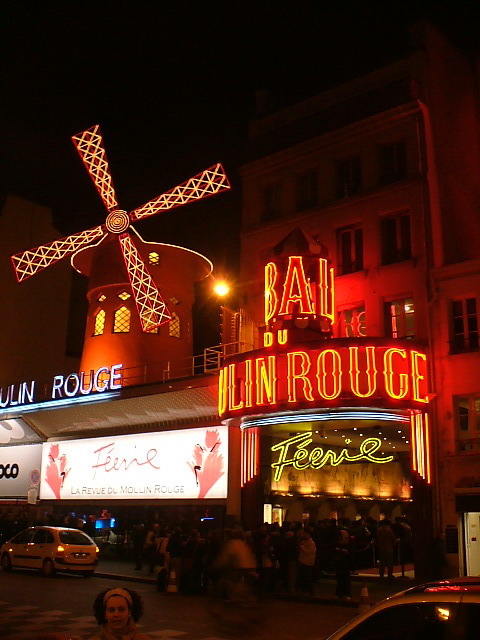
The Moulin Rouge

The music hall was first imported to Paris from London in 1862, and became enormously popular, with dancers, singers, acrobats, magicians trained animals. In the 1920s and 1930s they focused on music, and introduced many famous singers including Mistinguett, Josephine Baker, and Edith Piaf. The traditional clubs include the Folies-Bergere, founded in 1869, followed by the Moulin Rouge founded in 1889, which first presented the dance known as the French Cancan.

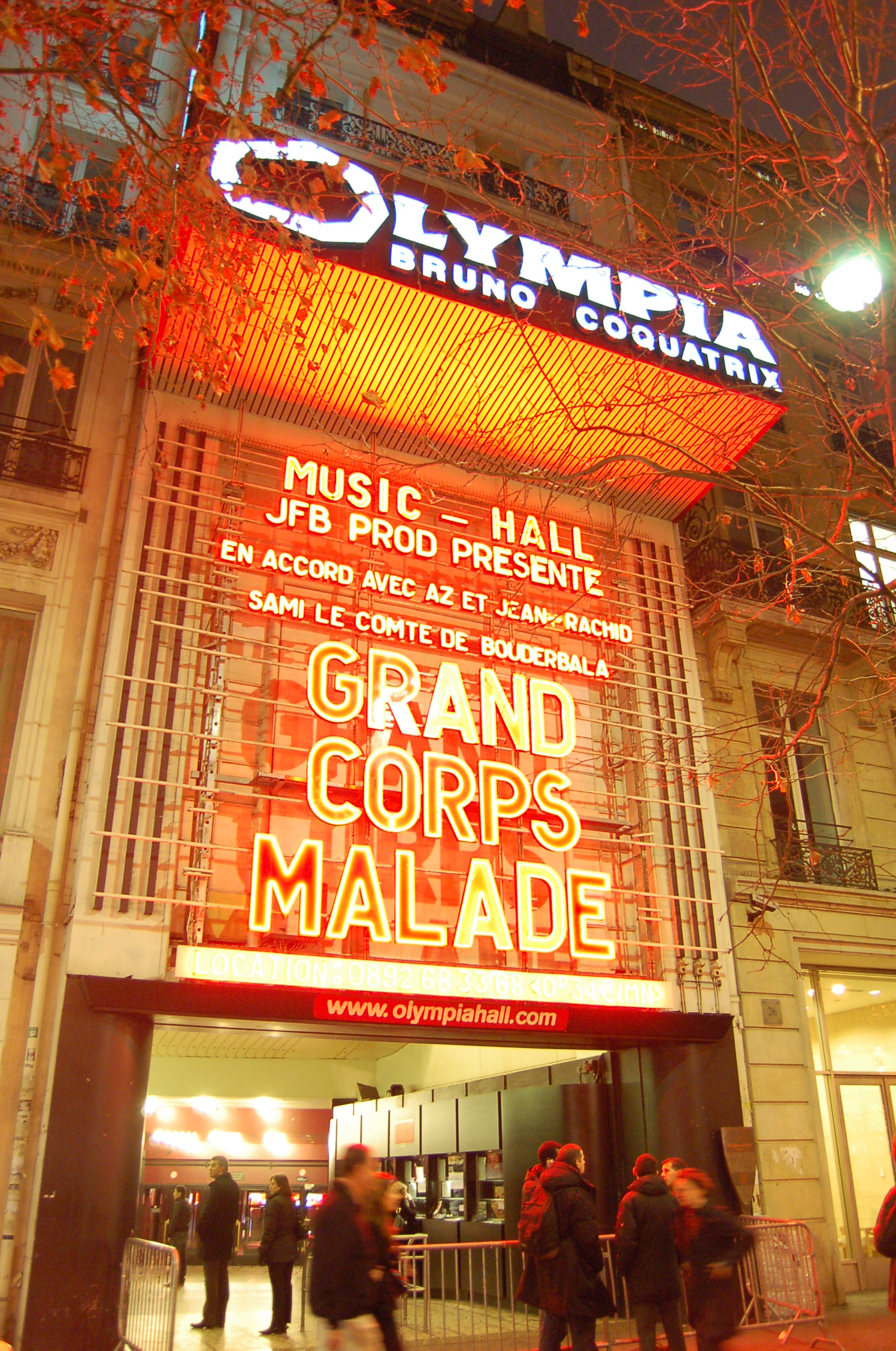
The Olympia Music Hall

The Olympia, founded in 1893, in 1911 became the first music hall to stage its shows on a huge stairway. The Moulin Rouge, Folies-Bergere and Casino de Paris continue to present spectacular musical reviews, though their clientele now is mainly tourists. The Olympia Music Hall has been transformed into a concert hall, presenting well-known singers and bands. A few new music halls have appeared, including the Crazy Horse Saloon, which feature music and chorus lines of dancers.

== Bal musette ==
Bal musette is a style of French music and dance that first became popular in Paris in the 1870s and 1880s; by 1880 Paris had some 150 dance halls in the working-class neighbourhoods of the city. Patrons danced the bourrée to the accompaniment of the cabrette (a bellows-blown bagpipe locally called a musette) and often the vielle à roue (hurdy-gurdy) in the cafés and bars of the city. French and Italian musicians who played the accordion adopted the style and established themselves in Auvergnat bars, especially in the 19th arrondissement. It evolved into several different musical and dance styles, tango-musette, pas-musette, and valse-musette, all designed to be danced by partners close together in a small space. Its popularity declined after World War II, faced with competition from rock and roll and other forms of entertainment. A few jazz and dance clubs still present the music, and a few authentic bals are still held in the neighborhoods of the city. One club, the Vieux Belleville at 12 rue des Envierges in the 20th arrondissement, is devoted to reviving bal-musette music and dancing.

== Rock and popular music ==
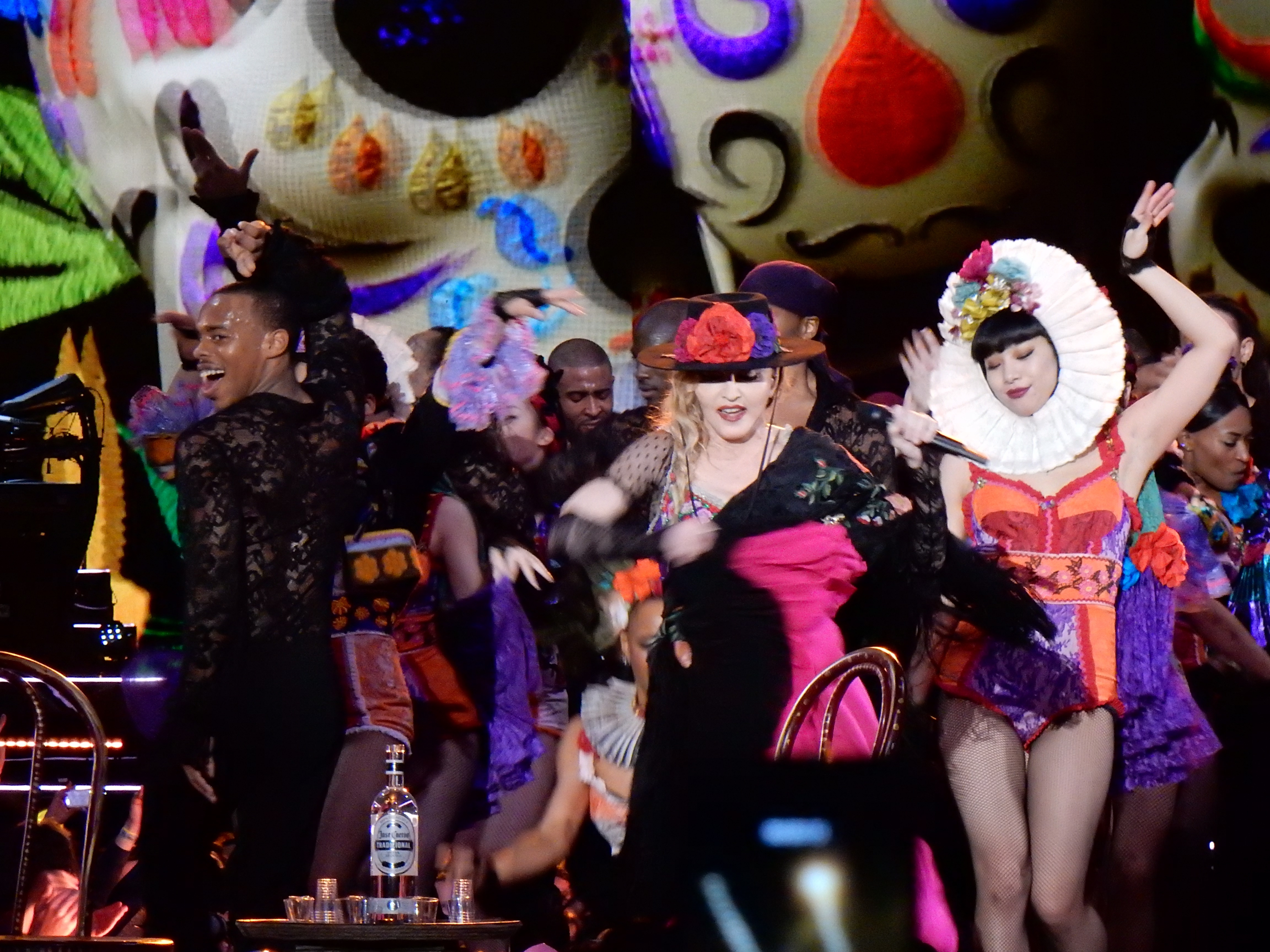
Madonna at the AccorHotels Arena (2015)

Paris offers concerts by French and international rock groups of all genres of rock and popular music. The largest concerts take place in the Stade de France, the national sports stadium located just outside Paris in Saint Denis. It seats eighty-one thousand persons. In 2015 it was the venue for concerts by AC/DC and Paul McCartney, and in 2016 hosted concerts by Beyoncé and Rihanna.

The largest concert venue within the city itself is the AccorHotels Arena. (formerly known as Palais Omnisports de Paris-Bercy and the Bercy Arena) which can seat up to twenty thousand persons. Madonna U2, Celine Dion and Phil Collins have performed there, and Johnny Hallyday made videos of four of his concerts in the arena. Janet Jackson and Adele are scheduled to perform there in 2016.

Another major concert venue is Le Zenith at the Cité de la Musique, which opened in 1983 and seats 6,293 persons. Over the years, the venue has played host to many French artists including: Jenifer, Jean-Jacques Goldman, Vanessa Paradis, Johnny Hallyday and Michel Sardou. Also, international artists including: Britney Spears, Christina Aguilera, Bruce Springsteen, the Grateful Dead, Alicia Keys, Amy Winehouse,

Several former musical theaters now present regular concerts of rock music. These include the Bobino Music Hall, founded in 1873, which hosted many of France's most famous singers, including Josephine Baker and Juliette Greco. It closed in 1983, but reopened in 1991. In 2007, it was turned into a cabaret named Bobin'o, located in Montparnasse, at 20 rue de la Gaieté in the 14th arrondissement. The Bataclan, founded in 1864, presented musical comedy. It was transformed into a rock club in the 1960s. The Bataclan was the scene of a notorious terrorist attack on November 13, 2015, which killed eighty-nine people. The theater was closed after the attacks; the interior was rebuilt, and it reopened with a performance by Sting on November 12, 2016.

Concentrations of music clubs are found in the streets between Chatelet, Les Halles and the Pompidou Center, and around Bastille, while others are found in the outer arrondissements. Popular music clubs uncle Le Klub at 14 rue Saint-Denis in the 1st arrondissement; La Mechanique Ondulatoire, at 8 Passage Thiéré, near Bastille, known for punk and metal. Clubs in the outer arrondissements include LaPlage de Glazart, a former bus station turned tint an underground music venue, at 1915 Avenue de la Porte de la Villette in the 19th arrondissement; Le Batofar, a former Irish floating lighthouse that now has a small concert hall, at Porte de la Gare in the 13th arrondissement, known for reggae, heavy metal, and aerobe; and L'Alimentation Générale, a large club which features an assortment of Brazilian, Cuban, West African High Life, East European jazz, and French hip-hop and electro-funk. Other well-known clubs include the Flèche d'Or, in a former train station at 102 rue de Bagndet in the 20th arrondissement; Le China, a Chinese restaurant and rock club at 50 rue Chareton, known for Manouche, R&B, funk and soul music; Le Pompon, at 5 Avenue de l'Opera, known for independent bands and electro-pop DJs, and Les Trois Baudets, a venerable club and concert hall where musicians including Georges Brassens, Jacques Brel, Juliette Gréco and Serge Gainsbourg once played, which now presents French pop, electro and rap music, located at 64 Boulevard de Clichy in the 18th arrondissement.

== Jazz clubs ==
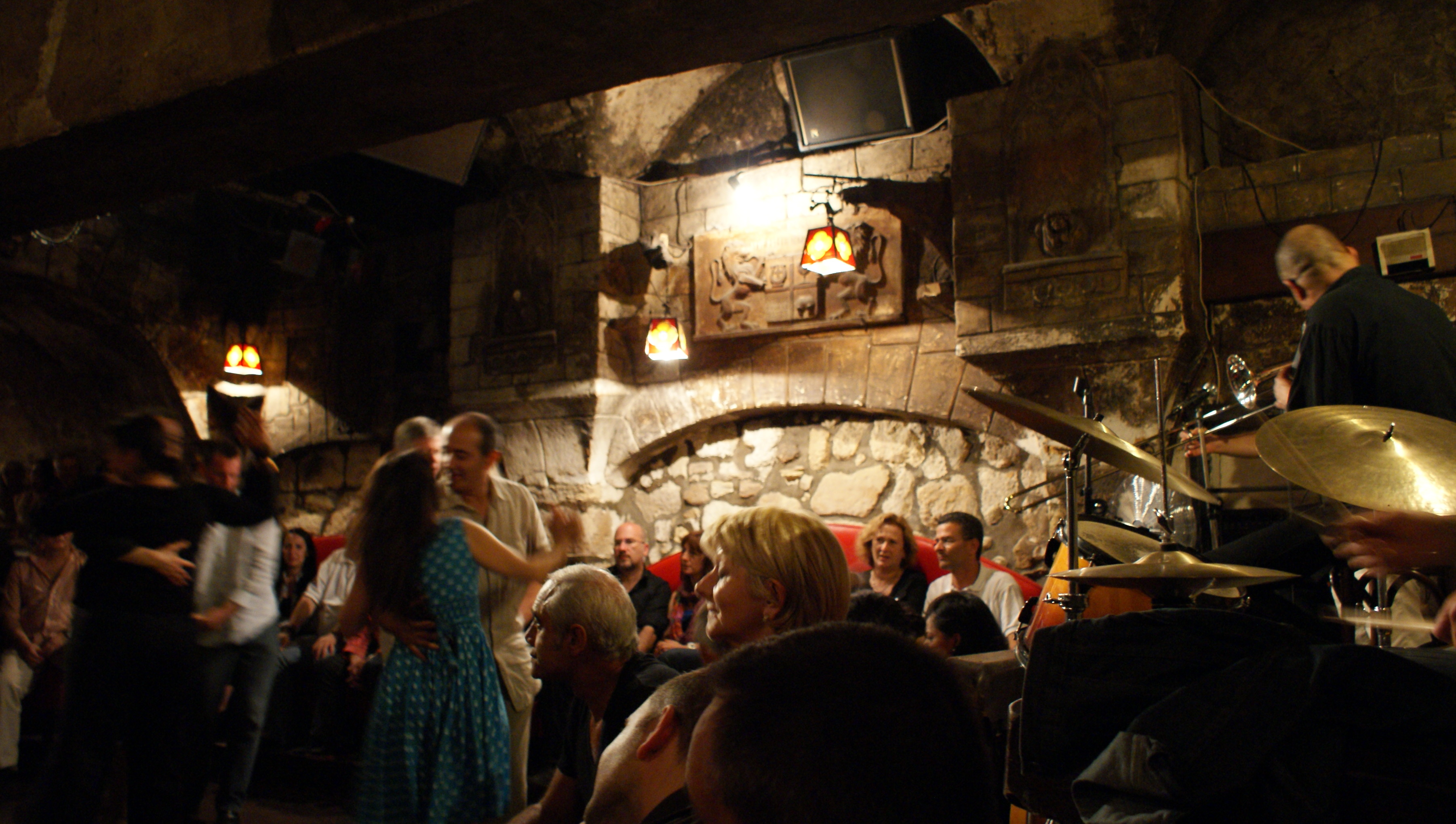
The Caveau de la Huchette jazz club

Jazz was introduced to Paris during World War I by a black American army band led by James Reese Europe, and took by storm the Paris music halls of the 1920s. It had a resurgence of popularity after World War II, where jazz clubs flourished in the cellars of the quarter of Saint-Germain-des-Prés. Today a wide variety of jazz is played in Paris clubs, which often have two performances at night and stay open until four in the morning. Notable clubs cited in a March 2015 survey of the best Paris jazz clubs by the Washington Post include the 'Caveau de la Huchette', the last survivor of the cellar clubs of the 1950s, located in the basement of a 16th-century building in the 5th arrondissement; the 'Improviste', located on a barge on the Seine, known for Bebop music; the 'Bab-Ilo' next to Montmartre, known for Brazilian and Caribbean jazz; the 'Café Universel' on Rue Saint Jacques, popular with students and noted for vocal music.

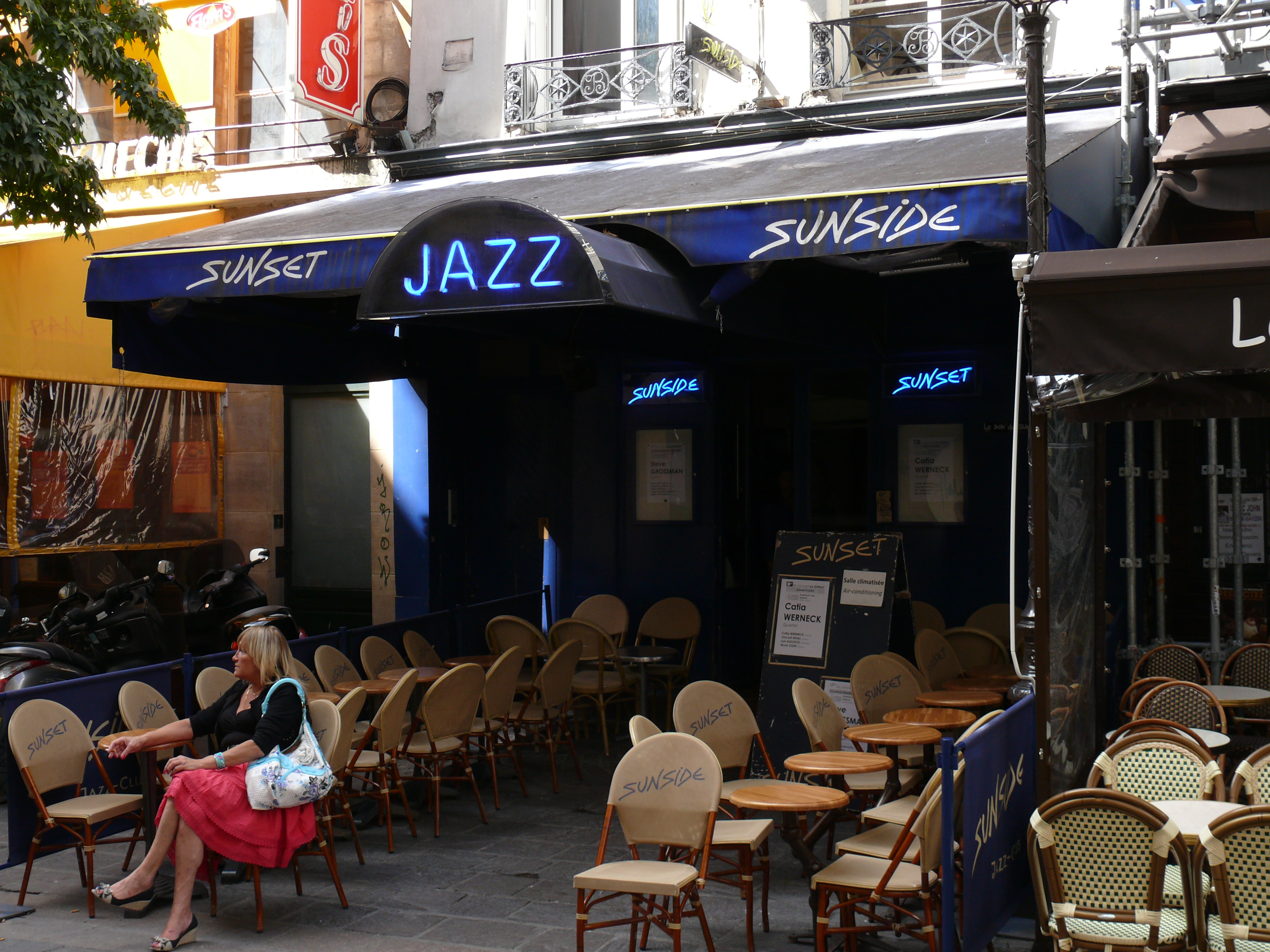
The Sunset-Sunside jazz club

Three jazz clubs cited by the Washington Post, all in existence since the 1980s, are in the same neighborhood on Rue des Lombards near Les Halles; the 'Duc des Lombards', 'Sunset-Sunside', which feature well-known French and international groups, and 'Le Baiser Sale', which features fusion and world music, and many groups from West Africa. Manouche, or gypsy jazz, a more traditional style made famous by jazz musicians Django Reinhardt and Stéphane Grappelli in the 1930s, is the speciality of some clubs, notably the 'Atelier Charonne' near Place de la Bastille, and the 'New Morning' in the 10th arrondissement, which also features rock and funk groups.

Paris hosts several notable jazz festivals, including the Jazz sur Seine festival in October, and the more traditional Jazz Musette des Puces in June.

== Music schools ==
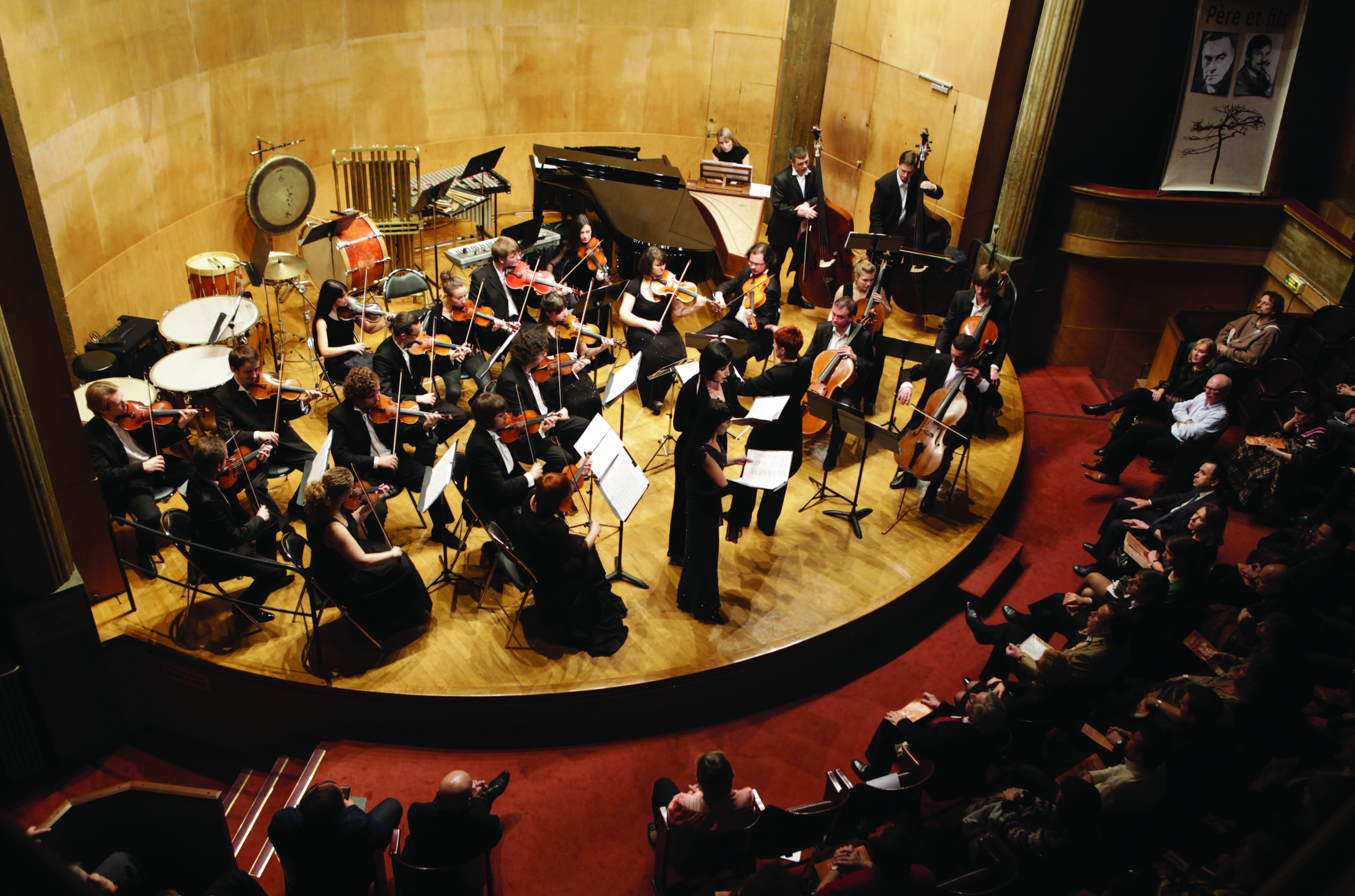
A concert in the Salle Cortot of the École Normale de Musique de Paris

The city of Paris has several important academic institutions devoted to musical education. The first and most famous is the Conservatoire de Paris, founded in 1795 shortly after the French Revolution, formally known as the Conservatoire national supérieur de musique et de danse de Paris or CNSMDP. It was the first state music conservatory in Europe; famous students and faculty included composers Hector Berlioz, Maurice Ravel, Gabriel Fauré, Claude Debussy and Nadia Boulanger. The school now located within the Cité de la Musique, near the Philharmonic Hall, in the 19th arrondissement.

The first and most famous ballet school in France, the École de danse de l'Opéra national de Paris, the school of dance of the Paris opera, was founded in 1669 for adult dancers, and began taking children as students beginning in 1776. Virtually all of the main dancers of the Paris ballet are graduates of the school. In 1987 the ballet school was relocated from the Opera house to the suburb of Nanterre.

The Schola Cantorum de Paris was founded in 1896 as a rival to the Conservatory; it put an emphasis on technique, and on the study of late Baroque and early Classical works, Gregorian chant, and Renaissance polyphony. Famous students included composers Darius Milhaud, Olivier Messiaen and Albert Roussel. The school is located in a former convent in the 5th arrondissement.

The École Normale de Musique de Paris was founded in 1919 by Auguste Mangeot and pianist Alfred Cortot, and today is under the patronage of the Ministry of Foreign Affairs. Famous faculty members of the school include Nadia Boulanger, Pablo Casals, Paul Dukas (composer of The Sorcerer's Apprentice), composer Arthur Honegger, harpsichordist Wanda Landowska, and conductor Charles Munch. The school has a small art deco concert hall, the Salle Cortot, designed by the architect Auguste Perret, which is notable for its excellent acoustics.

The Conservatoire Rachmaninoff is a private music school was which established between 1923 and 1931 by emigres fleeing the Russian Revolution, including Feodor Chaliapin and Alexander Glazunov. Its honorary president was composer Sergei Rachmaninoff. Today it provides music instruction in both French and Russian languages.

== Military music ==
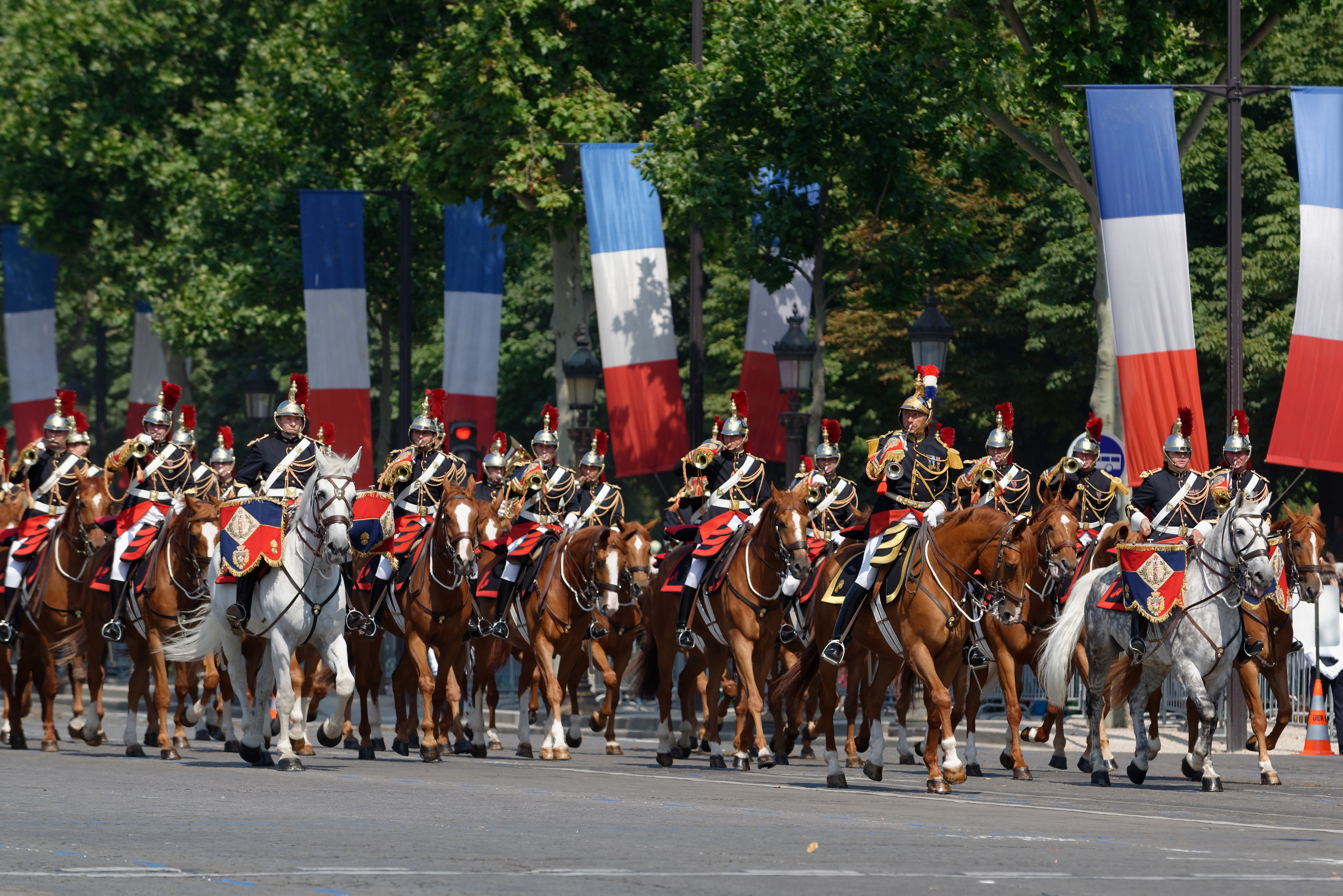
Fanfare of the Garde Republicaine on Bastille Day 2013

The French military in Paris has several musical ensembles, bands and choral groups. The most famous is the band of the Garde Republicaine, some of whose musicians perform on horseback. They are a traditional part of the annual parade on the Champs-Élyseés celebrating Bastille Day on July 14. The band, and a string orchestra belonging to the Garde Republicaine, play for presidential receptions at the Élysée Palace and other official occasions. The Ministry of Defense has a music school, the Conservatory of Military Music of the Army, located in Versailles.

The gendarmerie, or national police force, formally part of the French military, has its own band and orchestra. The prefecture of police in Paris, separate from the Gendarmerie, has its own orchestra called the Musique des Gardiens de la Paix, which belongs to the Compagnies Républicaines de Sécurité or CRS, best known as the Paris riot police. It is based at Vélizy, in the Paris suburbs. The brigade of Paris firemen, also formally members of the military, has a musical unit, called the Musique de la brigade de sapeurs-pompiers de Paris. It includes an orchestra, a band, a small jazz-rock band, and several smaller ensembles.

== Street and subway musicians ==
The profession of street musician has existed in Paris since the Middle Ages- street singers and musicians had their own professional guild. Beginning in the 17th century, the most popular venue for musicians was the Pont Neuf. (See History of music in Paris). Today street musicians of every variety can be found on the squares and steers in the center of Paris, wherever people gather. The musicians who perform in the tunnels of the Paris Metro belong to a special category; because of limited space, they must audition and are selected for assignment to particular locations.

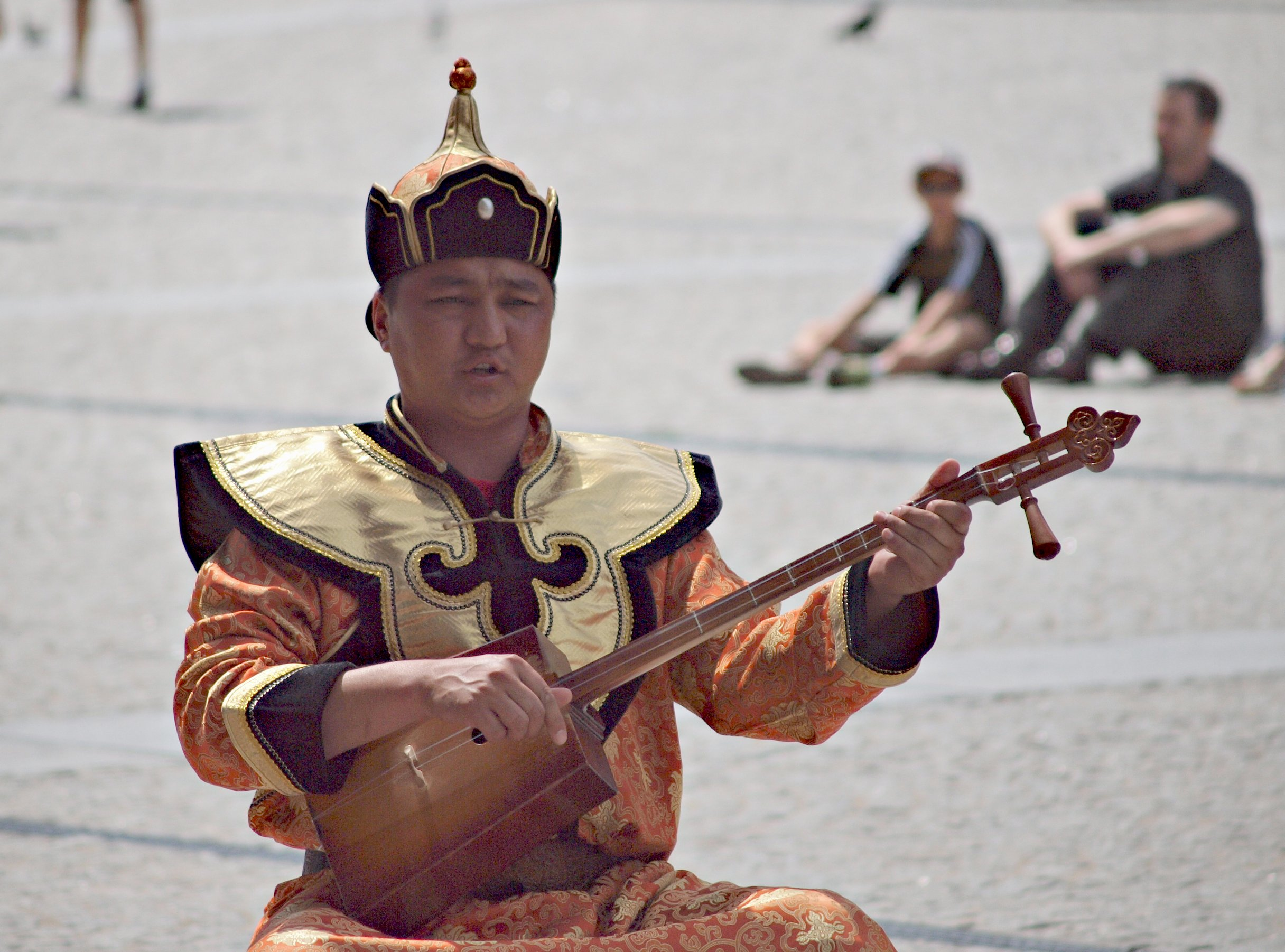
A Mongolian Tovshuur player

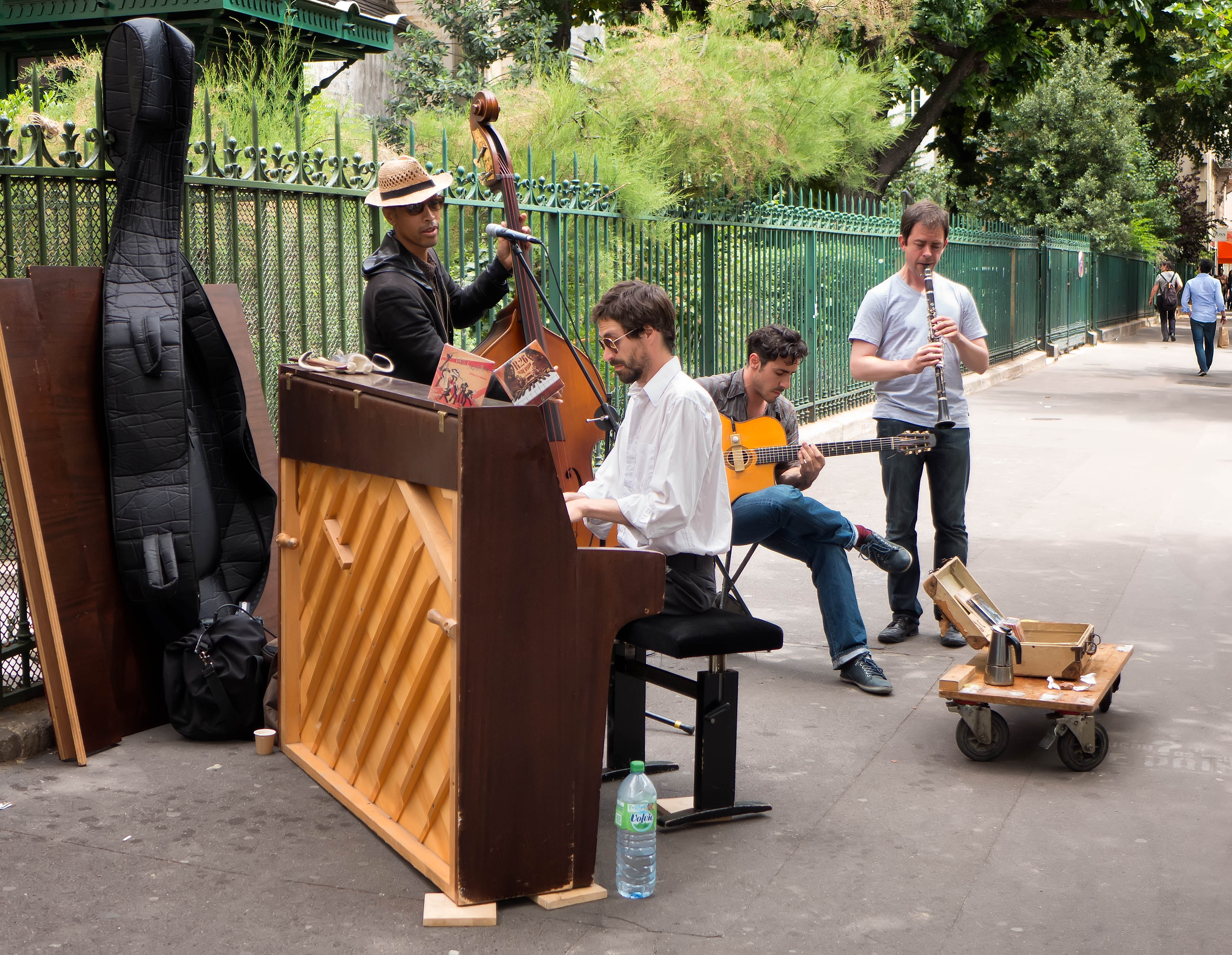
The Hot Sugar Band at Saint=Germain-des-Pres

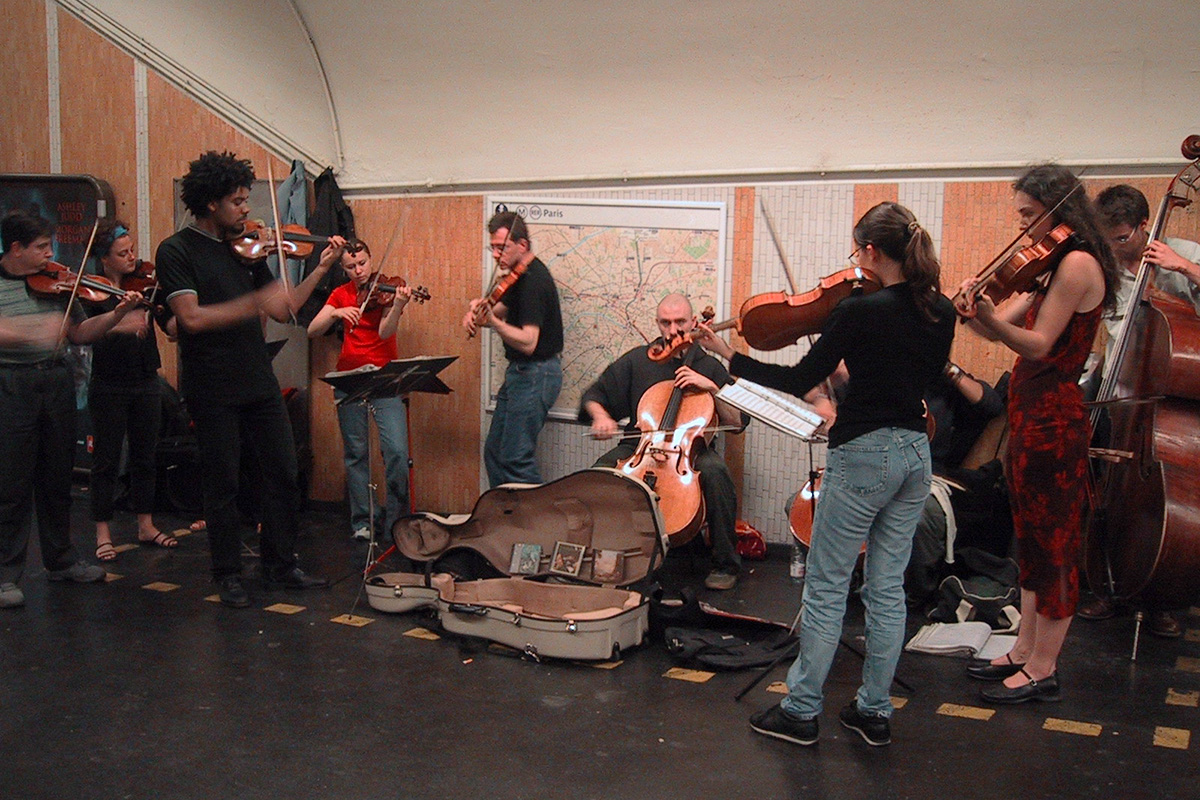
Musicians in the Paris Metro stations must pass an audition to have a place

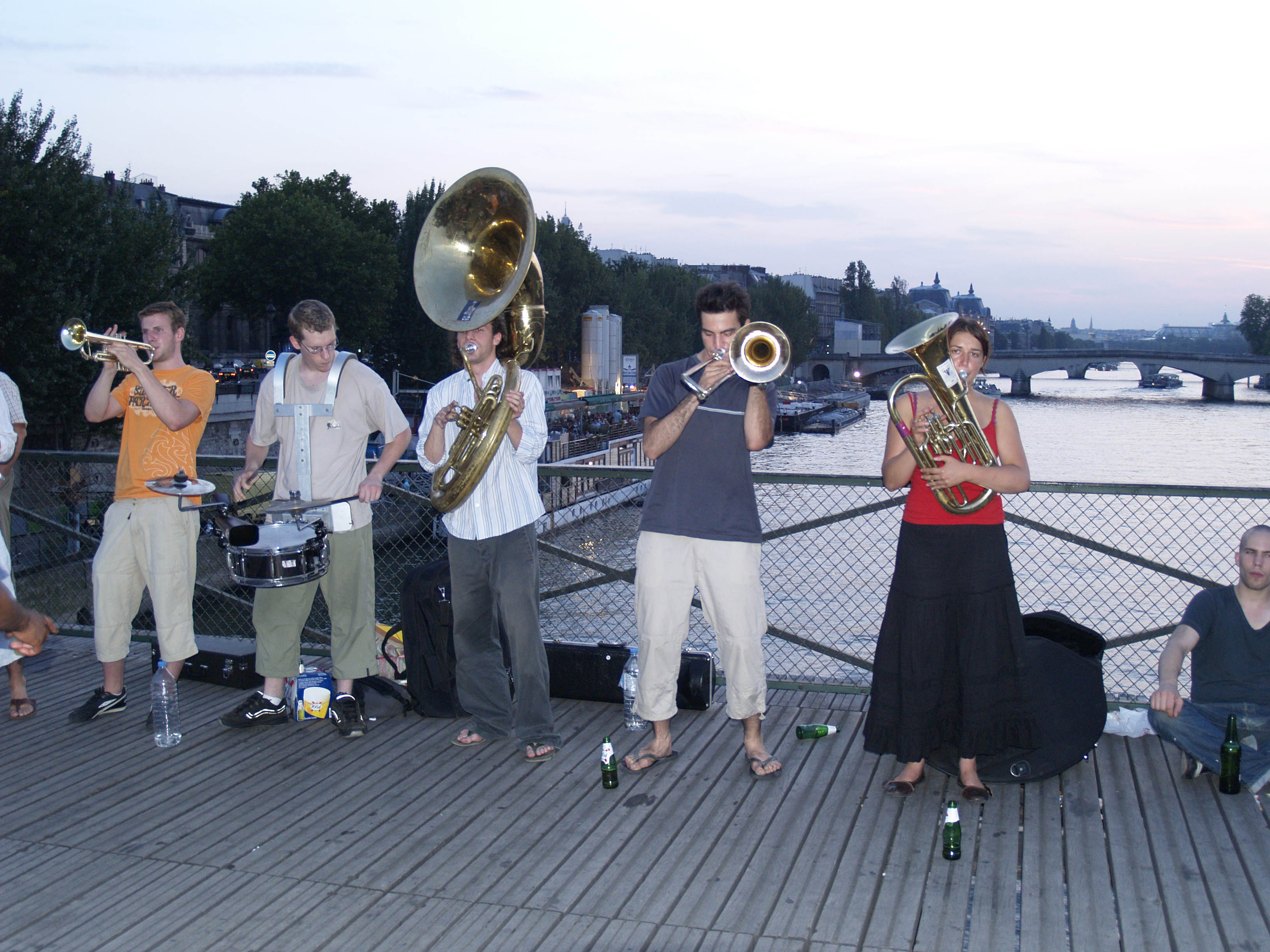
A brass band on the Pont des Arts

== Festivals ==
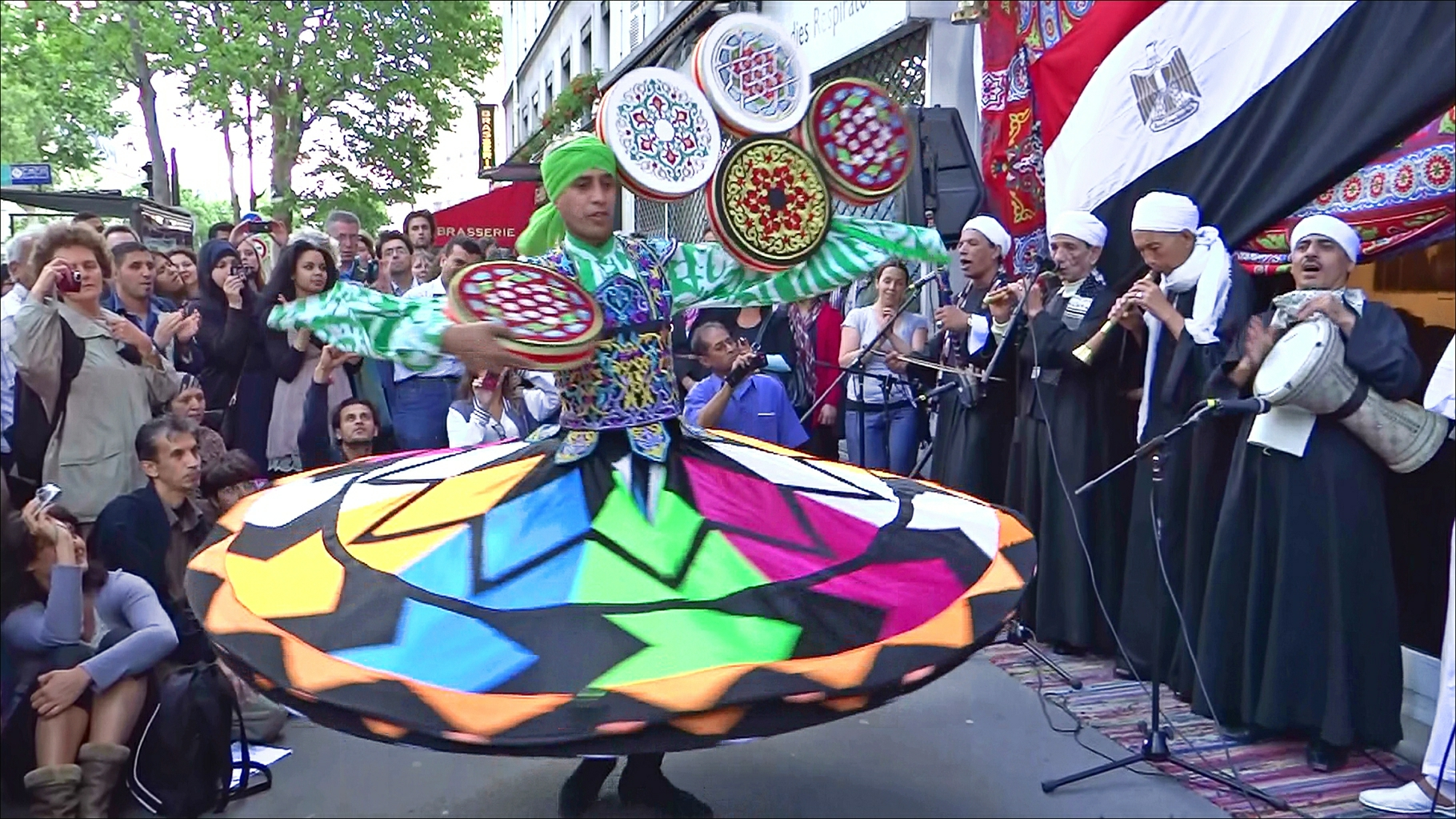
Egyptian dancers at the Fete de la Musique, 2013

A number of musical festivals take place annually in Paris, including the Paris Jazz Festival and the rock festival Rock en Seine. The Fete de la Musique, held annually on 21 June (Summer Solstice), features free performances of classical, rock, jazz and world music at venues all over Paris.

== See also ==
- History of music in Paris
- Fairground organ, an instrument originated in Paris

== Bibliography ==
- Damschroeder, David; Williams, David Russell (1990). Music Theory from Zarlino to Schenker: A Bibliography and Guide. Pendragon Press. ISBN 978-0-918728-99-9.
- Dregni, Michael (2008). Gypsy Jazz : In Search of Django Reinhardt and the Soul of Gypsy Swing: In Search of Django Reinhardt and the Soul of Gypsy Swing. Oxford University Press. ISBN 978-0-19-804262-4.
- Hayden, P.C., ed. (1904). School Music: A Magazine for Music Educators (Public domain ed.). P.C. Hayden.
- Fierro, Alfred (1996). Histoire et dictionnaire de Paris. Robert Laffont. ISBN 2-221-07862-4.
- Lawrence, Rachel; Gondrand, Fabienne (2010). Paris (City Guide) (12th ed.). London: Insight Guides. ISBN 9789812820792.
- Mroue, Haas (2006). Frommer's Memorable Walks in Paris. John Wiley & Sons. ISBN 978-0-470-03712-6.
- Schroeder, Alan; Wagner, Heather Lehr (2009). Josephine Baker: Entertainer. Infobase Publishing. ISBN 978-1-4381-0086-9.
- Tillier, Alan; Spenley, Katherine (2012). DK Eyewitness Travel Guide: Paris. DK Publishing. ISBN 978-0-7566-9119-6.
- United States. Commission to the Paris Universal Exposition, 1867 (1870). Reports of the United States Commissioners to the Paris Universal Exposition, 1867. Vol. 5 (Public domain ed.). U.S. Government Printing Office.
- Vila, Marie Christine (2007). Paris musique. Parigramme. ISBN 978-2-84096-419-3.
- Wright, Craig (2008). Music and Ceremony at Notre Dame of Paris, 500-1550. Cambridge University Press. ISBN 978-0-521-08834-3.
