= The Other Colors =

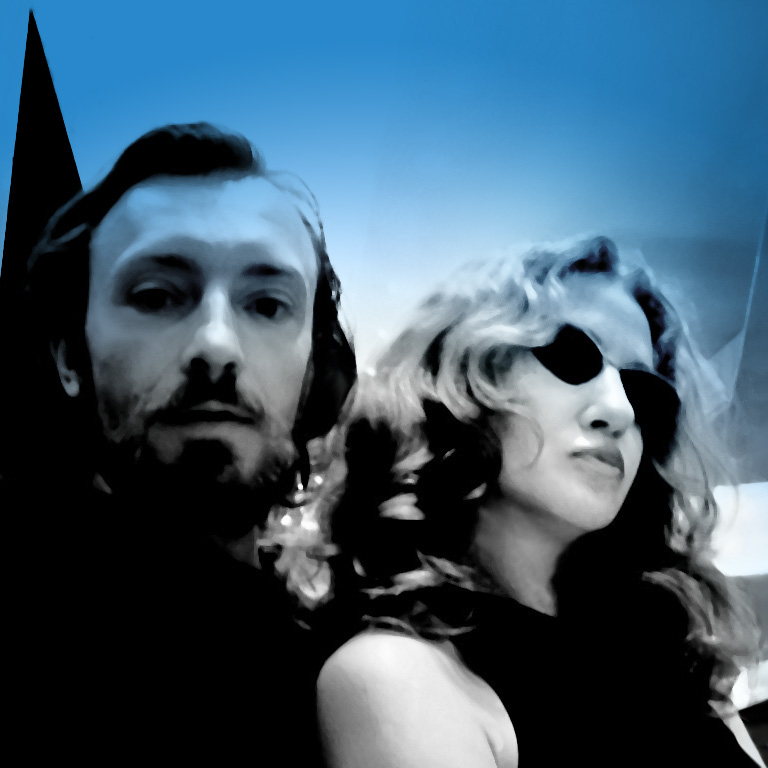

Background information
- Origin: France
- Genres: Electronic music
- Years active: 2007 - present
- Labels: LAC
- Members: Marie Möör; Laurent Chambert
- Website: www.theothercolors.com

The Other Colors is a French experimental electronic band. Active since 2007, composed of vocalist and songwriter Marie Möör and music composer Laurent Chambert. Previously trading under the name, Rose et noire, album releases : Rose et noire, 2003 and Trace dans le bleu, 2006 under the label Discordian Records. Their first public appearance took place on 29 January 2007, for the Rose et noire & The Other Colors concert, Petit Théâtre du Gymnase, Paris. The event was announced by Bruno Bayon in the Libération daily newspaper : A proof of Möör.

== Name ==
The Other Colors took their name of the first song Les autres couleurs on the album 361. Marie Möör said at the end of the text : So I dug a tunnel. I found a way. Elsewhere. I have discovered... An other reality. Other colors. In French : Alors... J'ai creusé un tunnel. J'ai trouvé un passage. Ailleurs. J'ai découvert... Une autre réalité. D'autres couleurs.

== Band members ==
Marie Möör is known on the French music scene for her distinctive style, expressed in songs such as Pretty Day, La Man and J'aime l'ennui. Having collaborated with renowned artists like jazz saxophonist and composer Barney Wilen, singer-songwriter Jean-Louis Murat, electro-crooner Bertrand Burgalat and pop star Christophe, she has been working with composer and musician Laurent Chambert since 2001. Experimenting with new song forms, she writes and performs his lyrics.

Laurent Chambert, a millennium pioneer in the world of electronic music, builds intricate labyrinths of sound, bringing together traces of melody and researched musical structure that result in heart-racing harmonies tinged with contemporary music recall. Winner of the 2008 Qwartz Electronic Music Awards : Laurent Chambert - Suspense, he has written, performed, and produced numerous recordings, including Eurêka, in the INA-GRM studios, in 2008.

== First album, 361 ==
In 2008, a first album 361. Jonas Mansor in a review wrote : "A bold, intelligent and complex album that manages to retain its highly melodic and easily accessible pop music sensibilities". An astonishing specificity since the beginning of their musical work : the accessibility for a large audience despite the language barrier and complex musical structures. The album works almost like a progressive story, the songs are like the division of a book into chapters. Lionel Delamotte, a French music critic written for the Chronicart magazine : "from the body language or the organic toward the spiritual or the meditative singing". The Other Colors played the "Brise la glace" musical triptych for the 2008 Qwartz Electronic Music Awards ceremony, accompanied by the French trumpeter Jac Berrocal. That same evening, Laurent Chambert won the Qwartz Experimental/Research prize for an album of Electroacoustic music called Suspense. Couleurs sur Marie, a portrait of Marie Möör and a review by Dorothée Smith was published in the January 2009 issue of the Movement magazine. The music album title Nous roulons dans les fleurs was published on the CD Sampler in issue number 57 of the Elegy magazine.

== Up up up ==
The Other Colors brought out a third album in 2012; the French texts of Marie Möör are again at the heart of the project. David McKenna written about Je veux and on the research and writing : "Best of all is when, as on Je Veux, Möör’s already fragmentary vocal parts are further processed, sliced to ribbons, pitched up or down, looped around themselves, linguistic expression revealed as a hall of mirrors".

== Releases ==
- 2008 361 (Album, LAC) (Möör, Chambert)
- 2010 ALF10 (Album, LAC) (Möör, Chambert)
- 2012 Up up up (Album, LAC) (Möör, Chambert)
- 2013 2013 / Pretty Day (Single, Remix, LAC)
- 2013 O.R (Album, LAC) (Möör, Chambert)
- 2015 Tout m'est égal (Album, LAC) (Berrocal, Möör, Chambert)
- 2017 2017 (Radio Edit) (Album, LAC) (Möör, Chambert)
- 2018 Who Am I? (Single, LAC) (Möör, Chambert)
- 2019 Masque d'or (Single, LAC) (Möör, Chambert)
