= Caroline de Bendern =

- Born: 1945 (age 80–81); Windsor, Berkshire, England
- Occupation: Filmmaker
- Years active: 1968–present
- Partner(s): Barney Wilen, Jacques Thollot

Caroline de Bendern (born 1945) is a British filmmaker and former model. A widely published photograph of her waving the Vietnamese flag at a demonstration in Paris became known as the Marianne of the May 1968 events (The Marianne of May 1968).

== Early life ==
Caroline de Bendern was born in 1945 in Windsor, Berkshire, the daughter of John de Bendern and Lady Patricia Sybil Douglas (daughter of Francis Douglas, 11th Marquess of Queensberry), and the granddaughter of Maurice de Forest, Count de Bendern.

== Paris, May 1968 ==
At a demonstration in Paris on 13 May 1968, de Bendern was photographed on the shoulders of her friend Jean-Jacques Lebel waving a Vietnamese flag. The photograph taken by Jean-Pierre Rey at place Edmond Rostand, near the Luxembourg gardens, appeared in Life and Paris Match.

== Film ==
Caroline de Bendern appears in a number of films made by the Zanzibar Group of radical French filmmakers, including Serge Bard and Olivier Mosset, which was active from 1968 to 1970.

Her own film À l'intention de Mlle Issoufou à Bilma documents a trip across Africa made with Serge Bard and others. The group included the saxophonist Barney Wilen, de Bendern's future husband. de Bendern is credited on Wilen's albums Moshi (1972) and Moshi Too, based on recordings from the trip. The 2017 reissue of Moshi includes de Bendern's film.

== Personal life ==
Caroline de Bendern was the partner of musician Jacques Thollot, who died in 2014.

== Filmography ==
- 1968: (as actor) Détruisez-vous (Destroy Yourselves), directed by Serge Bard
- 1968: (as actor) Un film porno, directed by Olivier Mosset
- 1968: (as actor) Fun and Games for Everyone, directed by Serge Bard
- 1968: (as actor) Ici et maintenant, directed by Serge Bard
- 1971: (as director) A l'intention de Mlle Issoufou à Bilma
- 1999: Zanzibar à Saint-Sulpice, directed by Gérard Courant
- 2011: (as director) Dark Gable - Archie Shepp and Joachim Kühn at the Fondation Cartier, May 2011
