= Marie Möör =

French singer and songwriter

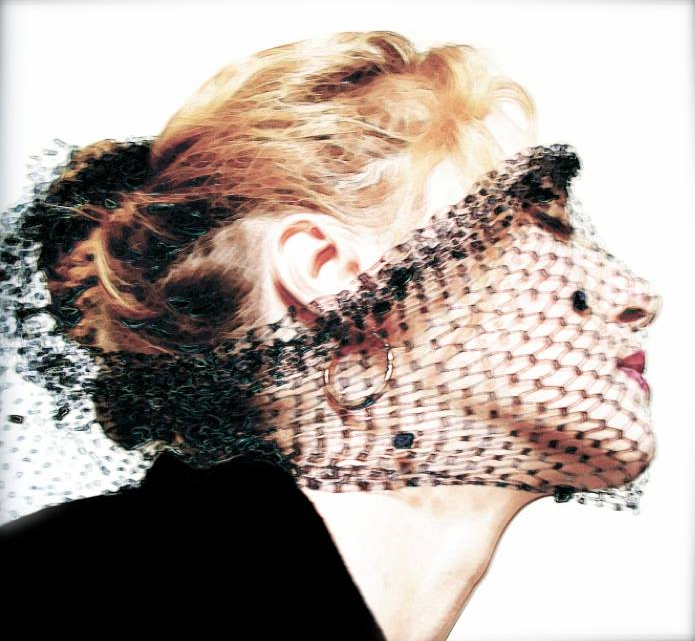

Background information
- Origin: France
- Genres: Synthpop, Electronic music
- Occupations: Singer, songwriter, artist
- Labels: AAAA, Alfa Records, Polydor (1987), Discordian Records/EMI (2003–2006), LAC
- Website: Rose Et Noire

Marie Möör is a French singer and songwriter born in France, Seine-et-Marne. Having collaborated with renowned artists like jazz saxophonist and composer Barney Wilen, singer-songwriter Jean-Louis Murat, electro-crooner Bertrand Burgalat and pop star Christophe, she has been working with composer and musician Laurent Chambert since 2001. Experimenting with new song forms, she writes and performs her lyrics.

== Biography ==
=== 1980s ===
In 1982, Möör met the French jazz saxophonist Barney Wilen, who at age 18 had played with Miles Davis. Möör's single "Pretty Day", features her lyrics and music by Wilen, who produced the record and played tenor saxophone, accompanied by Claude Micheli and Guillaume Loizillon.

The track appears on the 2008 compilation Bippp: French Synth Wave 1979-85 on the Everloving Records label, and on the 2011 release Marie Möör & Barney Wilen (Cendrilion). Bruno Bayon, a journalist with the daily newspaper Libération, said in 2007 about Cendrilion: "Le temps d'un album classique rock français." The 2011 album also features "Garçon à lunettes", "Mon blouson c'est ma maison", "Boys in Blue", "Angelo", "Beau masque", and "Skurt & Grixy", songs previously unknown to the public.

She returned to the studio in 1982 to record a second single with Wilen, "Illusions" c/w "Falling in Love Again".

Möör began drawing and painting with the encouragement of Wilen, who featured her work on his jazz album covers: Sanctuary in 1991, Dream Time in 1992 and Essential Ballads.

In 1987, Möör signed a contract with Polydor Records. Libération reported this with a photograph on its front page. A calypso-style single was released, "Prends-moi, Prends-moi", a song written by Wilen and Michel Moers of Telex.

=== 1990s ===
In 1993, Alfa Records released Möör's debut album, Aigre-Douce, in Japan and France. The album features a cover of the singer Damia and several French standards, as well as Möör's songs "Angelo" and (a new version of) "Beau Masque". She also sings on two tracks on Wilen's album Aigre-Douce: "Tu ne sais pas aimer" (a Damia song) and "J'ai le cafard".

In 1998, French singer-songwriter Jean-Louis Murat recorded an album, Svoboda, based on texts by Marie Möör. The album remained unreleased. In 2003, Bruno Bayon cited the Svoboda tracks "Je vais mourir sauf accident" and "Se voir se rendreas" as "worthy of" Jacques Dutronc and Françoise Hardy, respectively; while the album "has remained at the draft stage for contractual and economic reasons."

=== 2000s ===
In 2001, Christophe, one of the masters of French pop and best known for his 1965 hit single Aline, took two texts of Marie Möör : La Man and J’aime l’ennui for his album Comme si la terre penchait. A new artistic collaboration with Christophe in 2008 for the album Aimer ce que nous sommes. Marie Möör wrote the French lyrics of Wow wow wow (originally called Parc Rimbaud) interpreted by the French film actress Isabelle Adjani and Odore di femina.

In 2012, the French singer Bertrand Burgalat took the texts of Marie Möör : Sous les colombes de granit. The song was included on Burgalat's new album, Toutes directions, released in the spring of that year.

==== Rose et noire and The Other Colors ====
In 2001, she met the contemporary artist Laurent Chambert with whom she formed the project Rose Et Noire. A first album released in 2003, Rose et noire, after a six-track mini-album entitled Quelque chose de nouveau. A second album released in 2006, Tracé dans le bleu. Their collaboration will be continued with a more radical approach and an experimental music project under the name The Other Colors (Les autres couleurs). A first album in 2008, 361 . The Other Colors album releases : after 361, ALF10, Up Up Up, O.R, Tout m'est égal, 2017 (Radio Edit), Who Am I? (Single) and Masque d'or (Single).

== Releases ==
=== Marie Möör ===
- 1983 Pretty Day, Pretty Day tango (Single, AAAA Company) (Möör, Wilen, Micheli, Loizillon)
- 1983 Falling in love again, Illusions (Single, AAAA company) (Holländer, Arrangement : Wilen)
- 1987 Prends-moi, prends-moi, Beau Masque (Single, Polydor) (Möör, Wilen, Braque, Moers)
- 1993 Aigre-Douce (Album, Alfa records, Japan)
- 1993 Starbust forever, Barney Wilen (Alfa records)
- 2008 Bipp (Compilation, Everloving Records)
- 2012 Marie Möör & Barney Wilen (Cendrilion) (Album, Believe Digital) (Möör, Wilen)

=== Rose et Noire ===
- 2003 Quelque chose de nouveau (Single, Discordian Records, EMI) (Möör, Chambert)
- 2003 Rose et Noire (Single, Discordian Records, EMI) (Möör, Chambert)
- 2006 Tracé dans le Bleu (Single, Discordian Records) (Möör, Chambert)

=== The Other Colors ===
- 2008 361 (Album, LAC, Believe) (Möör, Chambert)
- 2010 ALF10 (Album, LAC, Believe) (Möör, Chambert)
- 2012 Up up up (Album, LAC, Believe) (Möör, Chambert)
- 2013 2013 / Pretty Day (Single, Remix, LAC, Believe)
- 2013 O.R (Album, LAC, Believe) (Möör, Chambert)
- 2015 Tout m'est égal (Album, LAC) (Berrocal, Möör, Chambert)
- 2017 2017 (Radio Edit) (Album, LAC) (Möör, Chambert)
- 2018 Who Am I? (Single, LAC) (Möör, Chambert)
- 2019 Masque d'or (Single, LAC) (Möör, Chambert)
