= Flora Théfaine =

Togolese-French choreographer

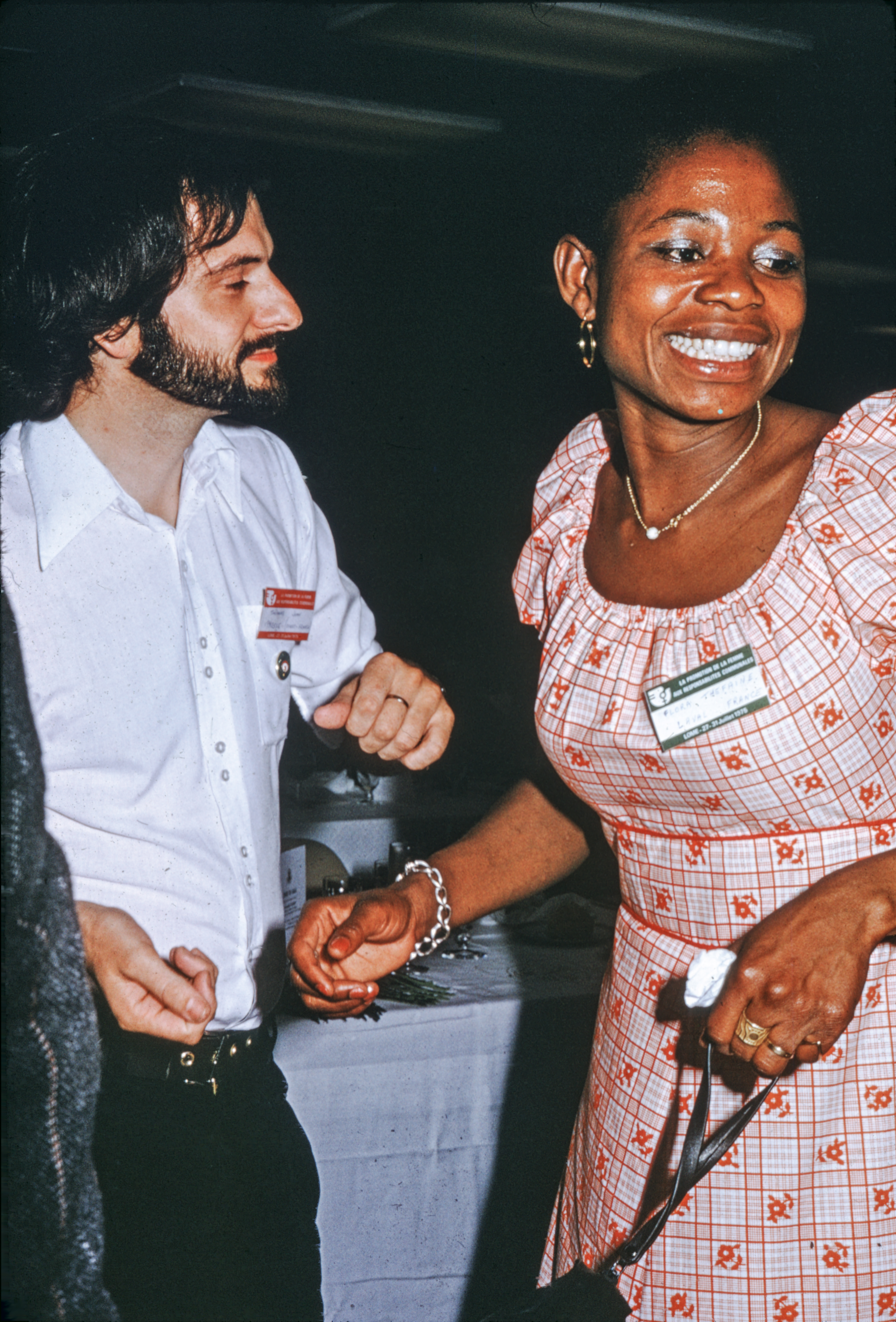
Flora Théfaine dances at a colloquium in Lomé, Togo, in 1975.

Flora Théfaine (born c. 1945) is a Togolese-French choreographer. Considered a pioneer of African contemporary dance, she is the founder of the dance corps Compagnie Kossiwa.

== Biography ==
Théfaine was born around 1945 in Togo. She moved to France in 1969, settling in Brittany.

There, in Quimper, she created the Compagnie Sarabande dance company. After moving to Nantes, she founded Compagnie Kossiwa, a professional contemporary African dance company, in 1989.

Her choreographed works since founding the troupe include Plissé Soleil (1990), Signes des Temps (1994), Les Porteurs de Légendes (1995), La Traversée du Jour (1997), and Je te donnerai, je te donnerai (2000).

In 2006–2007, she choreographed the solo dance Tant la cendre que la poussière, set to the music of Beñat Achiary. In 2007, she collaborated with the Senegalese choreographer Germaine Acogny to create Bintou Wéré, an "opera of the Sahel."

In Rwanda, she produced a project titled La pluie et les larmes to commemorate 15 years since the Rwandan genocide.

As a choreographer, she frequently works with amateur performers, notably in 2002's Plissé Dansé. Her contemporary-style choreography is inspired by traditional African dance, but she is interested in multicultural collaborations between artists of different backgrounds. Théfaine regularly tours France and Europe, as well as Africa.
