= Georgi Kornazov =

Bulgarian jazz musician

Georgi Kornazov Георги Иванов Корназов
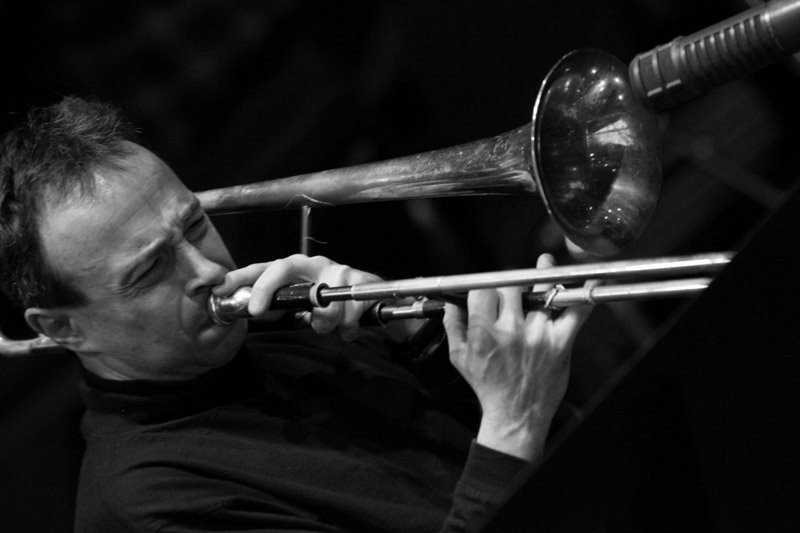

Background information
- Birth name: Georgi Ivanov Kornazov
- Born: September 30, 1971 (age 54) Sevlievo, Bulgaria
- Origin: Bulgaria
- Genres: Jazz
- Instrument: Trombone
- Years active: 1993–present
- Website: www.kornazov.com

Georgi Kornazov (Bulgarian: Георги Иванов Корназов French: Gueorgui Kornazov) is a Bulgarian jazz trombonist and composer, who lives in Paris, France.

== Biography ==
=== Early life ===
Georgi Kornazov was born on September 30, 1971, in Sevlievo, Bulgaria to a family of engineers. Soon after his birth, the family moved to Sofia.

Kornazov began to play piano at the age of 9 and trombone at the age of 12. He studied at "L. Pipkov" school of music and the National Music Academy "Pancho Vladigerov" in Sofia, Bulgaria. In parallel, Kornazov liked jazz and soon began to play with Bulgarian jazz musicians, including Milcho Leviev, Antoni Donchev, Stoyan Yankoulov, Theodosii Spassov, Hristo Yotzov, Simeon Shterev, Vesselin Koichev, the group "White, Green & Red," and the clarinetist Ivo Papazov. He created his first band, "The Dixie Jockers," in 1993.

In 1995, he joined the jazz department at the National Academy of Music and Dance (Conservatoire National Supérieur de Musique et Danse) in Paris, where he studied with François Jeanneau, Jean-François Jenny-Clark, Hervé Sellin, and François Théberge.

In 1996, he won the Prize for Best Soloist at the Jazz competition in Avignon, under the presidency of Daniel Humair. He was invited as a guest soloist by the Lorient Big band- the Bretagne regional jazz orchestra and he did several tours with: 1996 in Latvia, 1997 in Vietnam, 1998 in Cambodia and 1999 in French Polynesia.

In 1998, he graduated with honors (Golden Medal) from the National Academy in Paris, won the third prize as a soloist and the second prize for a group with Geoffroy Tamisier's «OLH Acoustic» sextet at the French National Jazz Competition «La Défense».

=== Career ===
In 1999, he created his first quintet with Stéphane Guillaume (saxophone, clarinet), Emmanuel Codjia (guitar), Thomas Grimmonprez (drums) and Antonio Licusati (bass), which won third prize in the competition "La Défense". Recorded the CD "Une vie sans lune" with Geoffroy Tamisier's "OLH Acoustic".

In 2000, Kornazov took part in numerous projects: the French National Jazz Orchestra directed by Didier Levallet under the baton of John Lewis (Modern Jazz Quartet) and Paolo Damiani. There he crossed paths with Francois Jeanneau, Gianluigi Trovesi, Christophe Marguet, Paul Rogers, Christophe Monniot, Xavier Jirotto, Gianluca Petrella, Mederic Collignon, and Anouar Brahem. He participated in Paris Jazz Big Band, played with Toots Thielemans, Phil Collins and Henri Salvador under the direction of Quincy Jones, as well in Bertrand Renaudin's "l'Arbre Voyage" with Herve Sellin, Yves Rousseau, and Jonas Knutsson.

Kornazov recorded his first album with original music "Staro Vreme" in 2001, "G meet K" with Kenny Wheeler and Geoffroy Tamisier's "OLH Acoustic", plus "A Suivre" with Paris Jazz Big Band. He formed a quartet "Tribute to JJ Johnson" with Denis Leloup (trombone), Pier Paolo Pozzi (drums) and Stephane Kerecki (bass).

From 2002 to 2009, he played with Henri Texier's "Strada Sextet". Concerts in France, Italy, Spain, Portugal, Germany, Austria, UK, Russa, Norway, and Libya.

In 2004, Kornazov recorded "Essence de roses", his second album with original music with Stéphane Guillaume (saxophone, clarinet), Emmanuel Codjia (guitar), Thomas Grimmonprez (drums), Sebastien Boisseau (bass), Krassen Lutzkanov (kaval) and Geoffroy Tamisier (trumpet)

Kornazov was invited in 2005 as a permanent member of Vienna Art Orchestra, conducted by Matthias Rüegg and also in the sextet of Jean-Marie Machado "Andalucia". European tour with VAO.[1]

In 2006, Kornazov created two new groups: Gueorgui Kornazov «Horizons Quintet» with Émile Parisien (sax soprano), Manu Codjia (guitar), Mark Buronfosse (double bass), and Karl Jannuskan (drums) and the trio Kornazov / Codjia / Tamisier.

In 2007, he was invited by the Nord Deutscher Rundfunk (NDR) Big band, Hamburg, where he worked with Bob Brookmeyer, Nils Landgren, Claus Stotter, Christof Lauer, Gene Calderazzo, Gary Husband, Dany Gotlieb, Eric Watson, Nils Wogram, and the composers and arrangers Steve Gray and Michael Gibs. Recording of «Viara» with the «Horizons» quintet[2][3] and "Le Gris du vent" with the trio Kornazov/Codjia/ Tamisier. European tour with Al Jarreau and NDR Big band.

In 2008, Kornazov recorded "Marcia New York Express" with Herve Sellin septet and participated in several festivals: Vienne, Marciac, Ramatuelle, Nevers, Les Arenes of Montmartre.

In 2009, Kornazov joined Jean-Marie Machado's "Danzas" band and made a recording with Manu Codjia quintet. Concerts in Paris – New Morning, Sunset.

2010: Creation of a new original project in Sofia «OTNOVO» with Antoni Donchev(piano), Rossen «Roko» Zahariev (trumpet, flugelhorn), Stoyan Yankoulov (drums), Georgi Donchev (bass) and concerts in Radio Sofia and Varna International Jazz Fest – Bulgaria. Carte blanche at the festival «Eclats d’émail»- Limoges, France and radio France, where he creates a special international version of «Again» with Alex Sipiagin (trumpet), Dimitar Bodourov (piano), Emile Parisien (sax soprano), Manu Codjia (guitar), Mark Buronfosse (double bass) and Antoine Banville (drums).

In 2011, he was invited as a soloist by the big band of Radio Sofia (dir. Anthony Donchev) and recorded “PART OF THE ART” with Mauro Negri European quartet with Mario Gonzi (drums) and Georg Breinchmid (bass). Concerts – Jazzahead Bremen,(D) Blagoevgrad Jazz Fest,(BG) BMC jazz festival – Budapest,(H) Mantova, (I).

In 2012, he joined Denis Charles's «The compagnie of musiques à Ouir»,[4] Geoffroy Tamisier's "L'Harmonie de Poche" and the new septet of Olivier Le Gois, recording the CD ABSTRACT with. Recorded the CD "La féte à Bobby" with Jean-Marie Machado "Danzas" with Andre Minvielle. Concerts in France.

In 2013, he created three new personal projects: «THE MAJESTY OF KENNY WHEELER» (tribute to the great Canadian trumpeter and composer) with Claudia Solal-voice, Jean-Charles Richard-sax soprano, Manu Codjia-guitar, Guillaume de Chassy-piano, Christophe Marguet-drums and Matyas Szanday – base, "Gueorgui Kornazov «BRASS SPIRIT» with Aymeric Avice – trumpet, Didier Ithurssary-accordéon, Bastien Stil – tuba and Eric Echampard- drums and the duo "SUZNANIE" with the pianist Leonardo Montana. Coming out of SILA, the 4th album with original music which received “CHOCK”- the highest critic in Jazz magazine. Recorded «DUKE & THELONIUS» with "The company music an Ouir" and «TRAPEZE» with Jan Schumacher.

In 2014, he recorded «SUZNANIE» – the fifth album with original music and coming out of “THE BUDAPEST CONCERT”, the 6th one. Caribbean tour with Tony Shasseur Big Band and SILA European tour: PORGY & BESS-Viena, MOODS – Zurich, LES MURS DU SON – La Chaux de fonds-Swiss, SUNSET – Paris and «BRASS SPIRIT»- Bar-le-Duc, France.

In 2015, he composed and arranged a new original program called «CONSCIENCE» for Big Band and three soloists. Creation in Sofia, Bulgaria in September 2015. Plays with Nguyen Le project «THE DARC SIDE OF THE MOON» (Pink Floyd) and David Venitucci trio with Christophe Marguet (drums). Concerts in New Morning, Paris, Nice, “SILA” European tour: Valenciennes, Monastier, France, NDR-Hambourg, Germany, Chalons, Dijon, Auxerre, Bourgogne, Lillebone and Paris, France

== Discography ==
- 1999: Une vie sans lune / O.L.H. Acoustic / Yolk
  Je règ le mon pas sur le pas de mon père / de Marc Beacco, arrangé par Laurent Cugny / Epithète & Co (bande originale du film de Rémi Waterhouse)
- 2000: L’arbre voyage / Bertrand Renaudin / C.C. Production
  A suivre / Paris Jazz Big Band / 2000, Cristal Records
- 2001: Staro vreme / Gueorgui Kornazov / Yolk
  Pour Kenny / O.L.H. Acoustic / Yolk
- 2002: Mediteraneo / Paris Jazz Big Bang / Cristal Records
  Princesse fragile / Christophe Monniot / Quoi de neuf docteur?
- 2003: Chimeres / Sébastien Texier / Night Bird Music
- 2004: Vivre / Henri Texier Strada sextet / Label Bleu
  Holy Lola / Holy Lola Orchestra / Label Bleu (musique composée par Henri Texier pour le film de Bertrand Tavernier)
  Essence de roses / Gueorgui Kornazov/ Cristal Records
- 2005: Swing & Affairs / Vienna Art Orchestra / Universal
- 2006: Mes mots / Jerome Seguin / JMUSE
- 2007: 30 Years Vienna Art Orchestra trilogie: American Dreams, European Visionaries, Visionaries & Dreams / Universal
  Windstille /Jan schumacher quartet/ Cristal Records
- 2008: Le gris du vent / Kornazov/Codjia / Tamisier
  Viara / Georgi Kornazov "Horizons" quintet / BMC Records
  Marciac-New-York Express/Herve Sellin tentet/ Cristal Records
  European Jazz Factory/Koppel, Piromalli, Kornazov, Andersson, Humair /Cowbelmusic
- 2009: Manu Codjia Quintet / Bee jazz
- 2010: Fiesta Nocturna / Jean-Marie Machado «Danzas» / Beejazz
- 2011: Part Of The Art / Mauro Negri Europart quartet / TRJ Records
- 2012: Senza Sordino /The Big Band of the Bulgarian national radio
- 2013: Abstract/ Olivier Le Gois / Rewind records
  Trapeze / Jan Schumacher / Bernett Records
  La fete a Bobby / Jean-Marie Machado «Danzas» /Beejazz
- 2014: Suzanie / Gueorgui Kornazov & Leonardo Montana /Kornazov records
  Sila / Gueorgui Kornazov Sexstet / Kornazov records
