= Zanzibar Group =

French collective of filmmakers

The Zanzibar Group (also known as Zanzibar Films) was a radical French collective of filmmakers active from 1968 to 1970. The group was financed by Sylvina Boissonnas and included filmmakers Philippe Garrel and Jackie Raynal. Sally Shafto has referred to them as "the Dandies of May 1968", in reference to the civil unrest in France at the time.

== History ==
The Zanzibar group comprised young radical French filmmakers, some of whom had dropped out of university to make films. The group's constituent members were dandies, and some were models. The group's work was financed by Sylvina Boissonnas. Productions were sparse: directors shot without scripts and actors were typically not paid for their work. The group shot on expensive 35 mm film.

In 1969, several members of the group embarked on a trip to Africa to shoot Serge Bard's film Au-delà. However, Bard abandoned the project before reaching their namesake destination.

The Zanzibar group dissolved when Boissonnas stopped financing their films and instead became more active in the French feminist movement. Boissonnas was unable to sell the rights to the group's films to distributors, and so the group's work remained relatively unknown until a 2000 screening at the Cinémathèque Française.

== Members ==
- Philippe Garrel
- Jackie Raynal
- Andre Weinfeld
- Serge Bard
- Daniel Pommereulle
- Olivier Mosset
- Frédéric Pardo
- Caroline de Bendern
- Zouzou
- Michael Chapman
- Eve Ridoux
