= Barney Wilen =

French saxophonist and jazz composer

- Born: Bernard Jean Wilen; 4 March 1937; Nice, France
- Died: 25 May 1996 (aged 59) Paris, France
- Genres: Jazz
- Occupations: Musician; composer
- Instruments: Tenor saxophone, soprano saxophone
- Labels: Fontana, MPS, Sunnyside, Vogue

Bernard "Barney" Jean Wilen (4 March 1937 – 25 May 1996) was a French jazz tenor and soprano saxophonist and composer.

== Biography ==
Wilen was born in Nice, France; his father was an American dentist turned inventor, and his mother was French. His father's American citizenship allowed the family to take refuge in the United States during World War II, where Wilen started learning the saxophone. After the family's return to France, he began performing in clubs in Nice after being encouraged by Blaise Cendrars, who was a friend of his mother. After moving to Paris in 1953, Wilen regularly appeared at the club Le Tabou together with musicians such as Jimmy Gourley, Bobby Jaspar and Henri Renaud, as well as American jazzmen passing through. In 1955 he made his first recordings, accompanying Jay Cameron and Roy Haynes.

Wilen's career was boosted in 1957, when he worked with Miles Davis on the soundtrack for the Louis Malle film Ascenseur pour l'échafaud. The same year, he released Tilt, his first album as leader. In 1959, Wilen wrote the soundtrack for Édouard Molinaro's film Un témoin dans la ville and recorded the studio album Jazz sur Seine with Kenny Clarke, Milt Jackson and Percy Heath. He wrote the soundtrack for Roger Vadim's film Les liaisons dangereuses two years later, working with Thelonious Monk. Wilen would return to composing for French films in the 1980s and 1990s.

In the mid-to-late 1960s, Wilen moved away from his bebop roots and towards rock and free jazz, performing with European free jazz musicians such as François Tusques, Jean-François Jenny-Clark, Joachim Kühn and Karl Berger, and recording with Swiss pianist Irène Schweizer and German trumpeter Manfred Schoof. In 1968 he released Auto Jazz, an album paying homage to Italian racing driver Lorenzo Bandini, and Dear Prof. Leary, dedicated to Timothy Leary, with an outfit called the Amazing Free Rock Band. The latter album has been mentioned as defining the principles for jazz fusion.

In 1969, Wilen left Europe for Africa with a group of travelers including Caroline de Bendern, his partner at the time, with the goal of going to Zanzibar. The journey lasted two years, with the majority of the travelers gradually dropping out or, allegedly, becoming marabouts. It would serve as the inspiration for Wilen's 1972 album Moshi, combining elements of jazz with traditional African music. As Moshi was a commercial failure, Wilen withdrew from recording for the remainder of the 1970s and relocated to Nice, where he worked as a producer and organizer of local jazz events. He also worked with punk rockers before returning to jazz in the late 1980s. He toured in Japan for the first time in 1990. In the 1990s he collaborated musically with his partner at the time, the singer and visual artist Marie Möör, and played with modern jazz musicians until his death from cancer in Paris in 1996, at the age of 59.

== Legacy ==
Wilen is mentioned in the 235th of the 480 memories collected in the book Je me souviens (1978; I Remember) by French writer Georges Perec: "I remember the saxophonist Barney Wilen."

In 1987, French comic book artist Jacques de Loustal and author Philippe Paringaux paid homage to Wilen in their "bande dessinée" Barney et la note bleue ("Barney and the blue note").

== Discography ==
=== As leader ===
- Tilt (Swing, 1957)
- Barney Wilen Quintet (Guild du Jazz, 1957)
- Jazz sur Seine (Philips, 1959) – with Milt Jackson, Percy Heath and Kenny Clarke
- Un témoin dans la ville (Fontana, 1959)
- Barney (RCA, 1960)
- Zodiac (Vogue, 1966)
- Jazz Meets India (SABA, 1967) – with Dewan Motihar Trio, Irène Schweizer Trio, Manfred Schoof
- Auto Jazz: Tragic Destiny of Lorenzo Bandini (MPS, 1968) – with Eddy Gaumont
- Dear Prof. Leary (MPS, 1968) – with the Amazing Free Rock Band
- Moshi (Saravah, 1972)
- French Ballads (IDA, 1987)
- La Note Bleue (IDA, 1987)
- Wild Dogs of the Ruwenzori (IDA, 1989)
- Movie Themes from France (Timeless, 1990) – with Mal Waldron Trio
- French Story (Alfa, 1990) – with Mal Waldron
- Paris Moods (Alfa, 1990)
- Sanctuary (IDA, 1991)
- Newport '59 (Fresh Sound, 1991 [1959])
- Modern Nostalgie: Starburst Forever (Alfa, 1992)
- Dream Time (Deux Z, 1992) – with Alain Jean-Marie
- Essential Ballads (Alfa, 1993)
- Inside Nitty=Gritty (Venus, 1993)
- Le Grand Cirque (Wan+Wan, 1993)
- Le ça: New York Romance (Venus, 1994)
- Passione (Venus, 1995)
- Talisman (IDA, 1994)
- Barney at the Club Saint-Germain (Paris 1959): The Complete RCA Victor Recordings (RCA Victor, 1997 [1959])
- More from Barney at the Club Saint-Germain (RCA Victor, 1997 [1959])
- Besame Mucho (Venus, 1997)
- Double Action (Elabeth, 1999 [1987]) – with Jimmy Gourley
- The Osaka Concert (Trema/RTE, 1999 [1994])
- Flash Back (Paris Jazz Corner, 2003 [1986]) – with Philippe Petit
- Dreamtime (Nocturne, 2004 [1991])
- Le Jardin Aux Sentiers Qui Bifurquent (CELP, 2004) – with Jazz-Hip Trio
- Live in Paris 8 Janvier 1983 (Marge, 2007 [1983]) – with Dièse 440
- Jazz in Camera (Sonorama, 2012 [1958]) – with Donald Byrd
- Moshi Too: Unreleased Tapes Recorded in Africa 1969–70 (Sonorama, 2012 [1969–1970]) – with Caroline de Bendern
- Four Brothers (Sonorama, 2015 [1960]) – with Lucky Thompson
- Live in Tokyo '91 (Elemental Music, 2019 [1991])
- Montréal Duets (Elemental Music, 2020 [1993]) – with Alain Jean-Marie

=== As sideman ===
With Art Blakey and The Jazz Messengers

- Les liaisons dangereuses 1960 (Fontana, 1960)
- Blakey in Paris (Epic, 1961)
- Paris Jam Session (Fontana, 1961 [1959])

With Miles Davis

- Ascenseur pour l'échafaud (Fontana, 1958)
- Jazz Track (Columbia, 1959)

With Bud Powell

- Bud in Paris (Xanadu, 1975 [1959–1960])
- Cookin' at Saint-Germain 57-59 (Mythic Sound, 1989)
- Groovin' at the Blue Note 59-61 (Mythic Sound, 1989)
- Paris Sessions (Pablo, 2002)
- Parisian Thoroughfares (Pablo, 2003)
- Shaw Nuff (EPM/Xanadu, 1979)

With others

- Chet Baker, Gerry Mulligan, Bud Powell, Clark Terry, Europa Jazz (Europa Jazz 1981)
- Jay Cameron, Jay Cameron's International Sax-Band (Swing, 1955)
- Franco Cerri, International Jazz Meeting (Columbia, 1961)
- Gil Cuppini, What's New? Vol. 2 (Meazzi Edizioni, 1961)
- Leo Ferre, Francofolies La Fete a Ferre Enregistrement Public a La Rochelle (EPM, 1988)
- George Gruntz, Jazz Sound-Track (From the Schmidthauser-Film Production "Mental Cruelty") (Decca, 1960) – with Kenny Clarke
- Lars Gullin, The Liquid Moves of Lars Gullin Lost Jazz Files 1959–1963 (Sonorama, 2016)
- Roy Haynes, Roy Haynes Modern Group (Swing, 1955)
- John Lewis & Sacha Distel, Afternoon in Paris (Atlantic, 1957)
- Thelonious Monk, Les Liaisons Dangereuses 1960 (Sam, Saga 2017)
- Marie Möör, Aigre-Douce (Global 1993)
- Stevie Nicks, Rock a Little (Modern, 1985)
- Jacques Pelzer, Never Let Me Go (Igloo, 1990)
- Eje Thelin, Eje Thelin 1966 with Barney Wilen (Dragon, 2003 [1966])
- Francois Tusques, Le nouveau jazz (Mouloudji, 1967)
- Rene Urtreger, Collection Privee Extraits De Concerts (Carlyne Music, 1982)
