= List of performers at the Montreux Jazz Festival =

This is a list of artists that have performed at the Montreux Jazz Festival.

== Artist performances by year ==
=== 1967 ===
The 1967 edition of the festival featured performances of three artists:

- Charles Lloyd
- Jack DeJohnette
- Keith Jarrett
- Jazz Focus 65

=== 1968 ===
The 1968 edition of the festival featured performances of four artists:

- Bill Evans
- Eddie Gómez
- Jack DeJohnette
- Nina Simone

=== 1969 ===
The 1969 edition of the festival featured performances of seven artists:

- Clark Terry
- Colosseum
- Eddie Harris
- Ella Fitzgerald
- George Gruntz
- Les McCann
- Ten Years After

=== 1970 ===
The 1970 edition of the festival featured performances of 11 artists:

- Bill Evans
- Carlos Santana
- Champion Jack Dupree
- Clark Terry
- Eddie Gómez
- George Gruntz
- Gerry Mulligan
- Herbie Mann
- Junior Mance
- Led Zeppelin
- Sadao Watanabe
- Stone the Crows

=== 1971 ===
The 1971 edition of the festival featured performances of eleven artists:

- Aretha Franklin
- Champion Jack Dupree
- Gary Burton
- King Curtis
- Larry Coryell
- Melanie
- Placebo
- Pink Floyd
- Roberta Flack
- Roy Ayers
- Dionysos

=== 1972 ===
The 1972 edition of the festival featured performances of 15 artists:

- Bo Diddley
- Chick Corea
- Chuck Berry And The Aces
- Herbie Mann
- Jean-Luc Ponty
- Klaus Doldinger
- Les McCann
- Lightnin' Slim
- Moses "Whispering" Smith
- Muddy Waters
- Odetta
- Stan Getz
- Stanley Clarke
- T-Bone Walker
- Willie Dixon

=== 1973 ===
The 1973 edition of the festival featured performances of seven artists:

- Albert King
- Canned Heat
- Carole King
- Clarence "Gatemouth" Brown
- McCoy Tyner
- Miles Davis
- Sadao Watanabe
- Donald Byrd
- Roxy Music

=== 1974 ===
The 1974 edition of the festival featured performances of 15 artists:

- Billy Cobham
- Buddy Guy
- Cecil Taylor
- Dee Dee Bridgewater
- Earl Hines
- Flora Purim
- John McLaughlin
- Junior Wells
- Larry Coryell
- Milton Nascimento
- Muddy Waters
- Randy Weston
- Sonny Rollins
- Van Morrison
- Soft Machine

=== 1975 ===
The 1975 edition of the festival featured performances of 23 artists:

- Albert King
- Andrew Hill
- Bill Evans
- Billy Cobham
- Charles Mingus
- Clark Terry
- Count Basie
- Dave Holland
- Didier Lockwood
- Dizzy Gillespie
- Eddie Gómez
- Eddie Harris
- Ella Fitzgerald
- Etta James
- François Lindemann
- Gerry Mulligan
- Joe Pass
- John Scofield
- Klaus Doldinger
- Larry Coryell
- Oscar Peterson
- Rory Gallagher
- Sadao Watanabe

=== 1976 ===
The 1976 edition of the festival featured performances of 20 artists:

- Al Jarreau
- Art Blakey And The Jazz Messengers
- Billy Cobham
- Cecil Taylor
- Clark Terry
- George Duke
- John McLaughlin
- John Scofield
- Klaus Doldinger
- Larry Carlton
- Leonard Cohen
- Monty Alexander
- Nina Simone
- Odetta
- Shakti
- Stan Getz
- Stuff
- Sun Ra
- The Crusaders
- The Dubliners
- Weather Report

=== 1977 ===
The 1977 edition of the festival featured performances of 27 artists:

- Albert King
- Average White Band (AWB)
- Ben E. King
- Billy Cobham
- Bob James
- Bonnie Raitt
- Charles Mingus
- Clarence "Gatemouth" Brown
- Clark Terry
- Count Basie
- Dizzy Gillespie
- Earl Hines
- Ella Fitzgerald
- Etta James
- George Duke
- Herbie Mann
- Joe Pass
- John McLaughlin
- Klaus Doldinger
- Larry Coryell
- Monty Alexander
- Muddy Waters
- Oscar Peterson
- Paulinho Da Costa
- Rory Gallagher
- Shakti
- Stan Getz
- Stanley Clarke
- Zakir Hussain

=== 1978 ===
The 1978 edition of the festival featured performances of 20 artists:

- Arturo Sandoval
- Bill Evans
- Billy Cobham
- Buddy Guy
- Chucho Valdés
- Clark Terry
- Count Basie
- Dee Dee Bridgewater
- Didier Lockwood
- Etta James
- Gilberto Gil
- James Booker
- John McLaughlin
- Junior Wells
- Larry Coryell
- Oscar Peterson
- Pee Wee Ellis
- Ray Charles
- Sonny Rollins
- Stan Getz

=== 1979 ===
The 1979 edition of the festival featured performances of 20 artists:

- Al Jarreau
- Albert Collins
- B.B. King
- Champion Jack Dupree
- Chick Corea
- Clarence "Gatemouth" Brown
- Count Basie
- Elis Regina
- Ella Fitzgerald
- François Lindemann
- Herbie Hancock
- Hermeto Pascoal
- Joe Pass
- Larry Carlton
- Lee Ritenour
- Oscar Peterson
- Rory Gallagher
- Peter Tosh
- Dennis Brown
- Terry Callier
- Terry Clarke
- Wayne Shorter
- Steel Pulse

=== 1980 ===
The 1980 edition of the festival featured performances of 20 artists:

- Al Jarreau
- André Ceccarelli
- Art Blakey And The Jazz Messengers
- B.B. King
- Carlos Santana
- Champion Jack Dupree
- Claude Nobs
- Didier Lockwood
- Dizzy Gillespie
- Elvis Costello
- Fats Domino
- Gal Costa
- Jimmy Cliff
- Jorge Ben Jor
- Klaus Doldinger
- Luciano
- Marvin Gaye
- Pee Wee Ellis
- Rodger Fox
- Stanley Clarke
- Van Morrison

=== 1981 ===
The 1981 edition of the festival featured performances of 25 artists:

- Al Jarreau
- Albert Collins
- Andreas Vollenweider
- Billy Cobham
- Biréli Lagrène
- Chick Corea
- David Sanborn
- Dizzy Gillespie
- Elba Ramalho
- Ella Fitzgerald
- Herbie Hancock
- James Brown
- James Moody
- John McLaughlin
- Larry Carlton
- Larry Coryell
- Marcus Miller
- McCoy Tyner
- Mike Oldfield
- Monty Alexander
- Nina Simone
- Oscar Peterson
- Pepl/Pirchner Jazzzwio (Harry Pepl, Werner Pirchner)
- Rodger Fox
- Randy Crawford
- Robben Ford
- Stray Cats
- Terry Clarke

=== 1982 ===
The 1982 edition of the festival featured performances of more than 22 bands and artists:

- Alceu Valença
- B.B. King
- Billy Cobham
- Bobby McFerrin
- Claude Nobs
- Dave Brubeck Quartet
- Dean Brown
- Didier Lockwood
- Dizzy Gillespie
- Eddie Gómez
- François Lindemann
- Gilberto Gil
- Jackson Browne
- Jimmy Cliff
- Joe Sample
- Larry Graham
- Milton Nascimento
- Ney Matogrosso
- Rickie Lee Jones
- Stevie Ray Vaughan
- Sugar Blue
- The Crusaders
- Talking Heads
- Crossfire

=== 1983 ===
The 1983 edition of the festival featured performances of 21 artists:

- Art Blakey And The Jazz Messengers
- Bill Laswell
- Billy Cobham
- Buddy Guy
- Caetano Veloso
- Charles Lloyd
- Clark Terry
- Claude Nobs
- Fats Domino
- Freddie Hubbard
- Herbie Hancock
- Herbie Mann
- John Lee Hooker
- João Bosco
- Kenny Barron
- Naoya Matsuoka
- Ney Matogrosso
- Pino Daniele
- Pyramid
- Rickie Lee Jones
- Ronald Shannon Jackson and the Decoding Society
- Sugar Blue
- Willie Dixon

=== 1984 ===
The 1984 edition of the festival featured performances of 22 artists:

- B.B. King
- Bill Evans
- Bobby McFerrin
- Chris Rea
- Darryl Jones
- Casiopea
- David Sanborn
- Dee Dee Bridgewater
- Elba Ramalho
- Freddie Hubbard
- Gianna Nannini
- John McLaughlin
- John Scofield
- Klaus Doldinger
- Miles Davis
- Mezzoforte
- Monty Alexander
- Paco De Lucia
- Rickie Lee Jones
- Robert Cray
- Sade
- Stephan Eicher
- Steps Ahead
- The Itals
- Van Morrison

=== 1985 ===
The 1985 edition of the festival featured performances of 16 artists:

- Bob James
- Darryl Jones
- Dave Grusin
- Dean Brown
- Flora Purim
- Jack DeJohnette
- John Scofield
- Lee Ritenour
- Leonard Cohen
- Miles Davis
- Nina Hagen
- Randy Weston
- Rory Gallagher
- Ruben Blades
- Stevie Ray Vaughan
- Trilok Gurtu

=== 1986 ===
The 1986 edition of the festival featured performances of 33 artists:

- Al Di Meola
- Al Jarreau
- Angélique Kidjo
- Anita Baker
- Arturo Sandoval
- Chaka Khan
- Chris Rea
- David Sanborn
- Dr. John
- Eddie Gómez
- Elba Ramalho
- Eric Clapton
- Freddie Hubbard
- Gary Burton
- George Benson
- George Duke
- Gilberto Gil
- Greg Phillinganes
- Herbie Hancock
- John Scofield
- McCoy Tyner
- Miles Davis
- Otis Rush
- Phil Collins
- Randy Crawford
- Robben Ford
- Robert Cray
- Sadao Watanabe
- Sade
- Simply Red
- Stephan Eicher
- Talk Talk
- Wayne Shorter

=== 1987 ===
The 1987 edition of the festival featured performances of 24 artists:

- André Ceccarelli
- B.B. King
- Ben E. King
- Beth Carvalho
- Curtis Mayfield
- Dee Dee Bridgewater
- Dizzy Gillespie
- Eliane Elias
- George Duke
- Herbie Hancock
- Ivan Lins
- Joe Cocker
- John McLaughlin
- João Bosco
- Kenny Barron
- Los Lobos
- Monty Alexander
- Nina Simone
- Os Paralamas do Sucesso
- Paco De Lucia
- Paolo Conte
- Sadao Watanabe
- Stan Getz
- The Manhattan Transfer
- The Pretenders
- Katie Webster
- Keith Jarrett
- Hawk on Flight
- Jean-Luc Ponty

=== 1988 ===
The 1988 edition of the festival featured performances of 34 artists:

- Abdullah Ibrahim
- Rita Lee
- Biréli Lagrène
- Bobby McFerrin
- Booker T. Jones
- Carlos Santana
- Charles Lloyd
- Chick Corea
- Clark Terry
- David Sanborn
- Eddie Gómez
- Eddie Harris
- George Benson
- George Duke
- Gerry Mulligan
- Herbie Hancock
- James Moody
- James Morrison (brass)
- James Taylor
- Jean-Luc Ponty
- Joe Satriani
- Kassav'
- Lee Ritenour
- Les McCann
- Martinho Da Vila
- Miles Davis
- Milton Nascimento
- Monty Alexander
- Monteiro, Young & Holt with John Stubblefield and O’Donel Levy
- Randy Weston
- Robben Ford
- Salif Keita
- Stanley Clarke
- Terri Lyne Carrington
- Titãs
- Tracy Chapman
- Wayne Shorter

=== 1989 ===
The 1989 edition of the festival featured performances of 32 artists:

- Adriana Calcanhotto
- Al Di Meola
- Albert King
- B.B. King
- Biréli Lagrène
- Blues Brothers Band
- Buckwheat Zydeco
- Caetano Veloso
- Chaka Khan
- Darryl Jones
- Dianne Reeves
- Dizzy Gillespie
- Eliane Elias
- Elvis Costello
- Etta James
- George Benson
- George Duke
- Herbie Hancock
- James Morrison (brass)
- Joan Baez
- Joe Jackson
- João Bosco
- Larry Carlton
- Larry Coryell
- Little Feat
- McCoy Tyner
- Miles Davis
- Paolo Conte
- Stanley Clarke
- Steps Ahead
- The Manhattan Transfer
- Van Morrison
- Youssou N'Dour

=== 1990 ===
The 1990 edition of the festival featured performances of 37 artists:

- Al Jarreau
- Albert Collins
- André Ceccarelli
- Arturo Sandoval
- B.B. King
- Beth Carvalho
- Brian May & Kerry Ellis
- Caetano Veloso
- Claude Nobs
- Count Basie
- Dave Holland
- David Sanborn
- Dee Dee Bridgewater
- Dizzy Gillespie
- Eddie Gómez
- Etta James
- Flora Purim
- George Benson
- Gonzalo Rubalcaba
- Herbie Hancock
- Jack DeJohnette
- James Moody
- Joe Sample
- John Lee Hooker
- Jorge Ben Jor
- Kool & The Gang
- Lee Ritenour
- Les McCann
- Little Feat
- Miles Davis
- Nina Simone
- Ofra Haza
- Rachelle Ferrell
- Randy Crawford
- Roberta Flack
- Sting
- Van Morrison
- Wayne Shorter

=== 1991 ===
The 1991 edition of the festival featured performances of 39 artists:

- Al Jarreau
- Allen Toussaint
- André Ceccarelli
- B.B. King
- Bill Evans
- Billy Preston
- Bonnie Raitt
- Camarón de la Isla
- Chaka Khan
- Clark Terry
- Claude Nobs
- Count Basie
- Darryl Jones
- David Sanborn
- Dianne Reeves
- Deee-lite
- Eddie Gómez
- Elvis Costello
- François Lindemann
- Gal Costa
- George Benson
- George Duke
- George Gruntz
- Gianna Nannini
- Gilberto Gil
- Greg Phillinganes
- Herbie Hancock
- Jean-Luc Ponty
- Jimmy Cliff
- Kid Creole and the Coconuts
- Miles Davis
- Milton Nascimento
- Otis Rush
- Quincy Jones
- Rachelle Ferrell
- Ray Charles
- Robert Cray
- Stanley Clarke
- Sting
- Tomatito
- Tori Amos
- Toto
- Wayne Shorter

=== 1992 ===
The 1992 edition of the festival featured performances of 25 artists:

- Albert Collins
- Annie Lennox
- Arthur H
- Bobby McFerrin
- Buddy Guy
- Clark Terry
- Claude Nobs
- Earl Thomas
- Eric Clapton
- Gary Burton
- George Duke
- Gonzalo Rubalcaba
- Herbie Hancock
- Joe Cocker
- Makoto Ozone
- Mick Hucknall
- Pierre Audetat
- Quincy Jones
- Rachelle Ferrell
- Randy Crawford
- Rita Lee
- Simply Red
- Tony Joe White
- Tori Amos
- Tracy Chapman
- Wayne Shorter

=== 1993 ===
The 1993 edition of the festival featured performances of 54 artists:

- Abdullah Ibrahim
- Al Di Meola
- Al Green
- Al Jarreau
- Amereida Group
- André Ceccarelli
- B.B. King
- Barbara Hendricks
- Caetano Veloso
- Carlos Santana
- Chaka Khan
- Charles Lloyd
- Chick Corea
- Chris Isaak
- Dave Holland
- David Sanborn
- Dee Dee Bridgewater
- Dennis Chambers
- Diana Miranda
- Didier Lockwood
- Eddie Harris
- Etta James
- Fats Domino
- François Lindemann
- George Duke
- Gilberto Gil
- Greg Phillinganes
- Herbie Hancock
- Ira Coleman
- Jacky Terrasson
- James Brown
- James Morrison (brass)
- Joe Sample
- John McLaughlin
- John Scofield
- Joshua Redman
- Klaus Doldinger
- Larry Graham
- Marcus Miller
- Margareth Menezes
- Monty Alexander
- Muddy Waters
- Paolo Conte
- Paulinho Da Costa
- Rachelle Ferrell
- Richard Galliano
- Robben Ford
- Robert Plant
- Salif Keita
- Sens Unik
- Third World
- Us3
- Ute Lemper
- Zap Mama

=== 1994 ===
The 1994 edition of the festival featured performances of 38 artists:

- Al Di Meola
- Andreas Vollenweider
- Angélique Kidjo
- Betty Carter
- Bob Dylan
- Bobby McFerrin
- Brian May & Kerry Ellis
- Christian McBride
- Daniela Mercury
- Dean Brown
- Diana Miranda
- Eddie Gómez
- Eliane Elias
- Fito Paez
- Gabrielle Goodman
- Gotthard
- Herbie Hancock
- Isamel Lo
- Ivan Lins
- Jacky Terrasson
- James Morrison (brass)
- Jean-Luc Ponty
- John Scofield
- Johnny Cash
- Jorge Ben Jor
- Joshua Redman
- Marcus Miller
- Monty Alexander
- Natalie Cole
- Ney Matogrosso
- Noa
- Pat Metheny
- Paquito D'Rivera
- Paul Rodgers
- Pierre Audetat
- Randy Weston
- Rory Gallagher
- Roy Hargrove
- Sens Unik
- Stanley Clarke
- Stephan Eicher
- Terri Lyne Carrington
- The Roots
- Van Morrison

=== 1995 ===
The 1995 edition of the festival featured performances of 30 artists:

- Arturo Sandoval
- B.B. King
- Baaba Maal
- Chaka Khan
- Christian McBride
- Dennis Chambers
- Dianne Reeves
- Dr. John
- Gal Costa
- Gary Moore
- George Benson
- Jacky Terrasson
- James Brown
- James Taylor
- Jamie Jones (All 4 One)
- Jamiroquai
- John McLaughlin
- João Bosco
- Keltic Possé
- Marianne Faithfull
- Monty Alexander
- Olodum
- Randy Crawford
- Randy Weston
- Salif Keita
- The Manhattan Transfer
- Tony Bennett
- Tuck & Patti
- Van Morrison
- Youssou N'Dour

=== 1996 ===
The 1996 edition of the festival featured performances of 45 artists:

- Al Di Meola
- Al Jarreau
- Bo Diddley
- Carlos Santana
- Chaka Khan
- Clarence "Gatemouth" Brown
- David Sanborn
- Dean Brown
- Deep Purple
- Elvis Costello
- François Lindemann
- Gabrielle
- George Benson
- George Duke
- Greg Phillinganes
- Herbie Hancock
- Isaac Hayes
- James Morrison (brass)
- John McLaughlin
- Keb' Mo'
- Kenny Barron
- Lenny White
- Manu Katché
- Marcus Miller
- Maria Bethânia
- McCoy Tyner
- Mick Hucknall
- Milton Nascimento
- Oscar Peterson
- Otis Rush
- Paco De Lucia
- Patti Austin
- Phil Collins
- Pierre Audetat
- Quincy Jones
- Richard Galliano
- Simply Red
- Sonny Emory
- Stephan Eicher
- Tony Bennett
- Us3
- Van Morrison
- Wayne Shorter
- ZZ Top
- Zucchero

=== 1997 ===
The 1997 edition of the festival featured performances of 48 artists:

- Angélique Kidjo
- Avishai Cohen
- B.B. King
- Bobby McFerrin
- Brad Mehldau
- Chick Corea
- Chico Cesar
- Chris Rea
- Chucho Valdés
- Claude Nobs
- Dave Holland
- David Sanborn
- Diana Krall
- Djavan
- Doug Wimbish
- Earth, Wind & Fire
- Emerson, Lake & Palmer
- Eric Clapton
- Faithless
- Gary Burton
- Gary Moore
- George Duke
- Gilberto Gil
- Herbie Hancock
- Ira Coleman
- Jack DeJohnette
- Joe Sample
- John Scofield
- Jorge Ben Jor
- Joshua Redman
- Kronos Quartet
- Larry Carlton
- Larry Graham
- Lee Ritenour
- Madeleine Peyroux
- Makoto Ozone
- Marcus Miller
- Michael Rose
- Monty Alexander
- Patti Austin
- Pee Wee Ellis
- Rachelle Ferrell
- Ray Charles
- Robert Cray
- Sheryl Crow
- Sonny Emory
- Supertramp
- Van Morrison
- Ziggy Marley

=== 1998 ===
The 1998 edition of the festival featured performances of 43 artists:

- Al Jarreau
- Alceu Valença
- B.B. King
- Billy Cobham
- Bob Dylan
- Bootsy Collins
- Buddy Guy
- Candy Dulfer
- Carlos Santana
- Charlie Musselwhite
- Cubanismo!
- Dennis Chambers
- Earth, Wind & Fire
- Erik Truffaz
- George Benson
- George Duke
- Gilberto Gil
- Gonzalo Rubalcaba
- Herbie Hancock
- Ivete Sangalo
- Jeff Beck
- John McLaughlin
- Jorge Ben Jor
- Keb' Mo'
- Klaus Doldinger
- Laurent Garnier
- Les McCann
- Mavis Staples
- Morcheeba
- Nils Landgren
- Nils Petter Molvaer
- Oleta Adams
- Pee Wee Ellis
- Phil Collins
- Polar
- Ray Lema
- Sadao Watanabe
- Sens Unik
- Sonny Emory
- Terry Callier
- The Corrs
- Tower Of Power
- Van Morrison
- Will Calhoun

=== 1999 ===
The 1999 edition of the festival featured performances of 50 artists:

- Al Green
- Alanis Morissette
- Asher Selector
- B.B. King
- Baaba Maal
- Ben Harper
- Beverley Knight
- Blondie
- Bob James
- Charles Lloyd
- Chico Cesar
- Chucho Valdés
- Clark Terry
- Claude Nobs
- Daniela Mercury
- David Sanborn
- Dean Brown
- Earl 16
- Elba Ramalho
- Elvis Costello
- Fourplay
- Fred Wesley
- Gary Moore
- George Duke
- Gianna Nannini
- Herbie Hancock
- Ira Coleman
- James Taylor
- John McLaughlin
- Larry Carlton
- Lenny White
- Manu Katché
- Marianne Faithfull
- Milton Nascimento
- Natacha Atlas
- Ney Matogrosso
- Nils Landgren
- Noa
- R.E.M.
- Rachelle Ferrell
- Rickie Lee Jones
- Robben Ford
- Sonny Emory
- Stanley Clarke
- Terri Lyne Carrington
- The Roots
- Trilok Gurtu
- Van Morrison
- Zakir Hussain
- dEUS

=== 2000 ===
The 2000 edition of the festival featured performances of 39 artists:

- Al Jarreau
- André Rio
- Angie Stone
- Asher Selector
- B.B. King
- Blackalicious
- Brad Mehldau
- Candy Dulfer
- Clarence "Gatemouth" Brown
- D'Angelo
- David Sanborn
- Deep Purple
- Diana Krall
- Elba Ramalho
- Emilíana Torrini
- Everything But the Girl
- Fazıl Say
- George Benson
- George Duke
- Horace Andy
- Jack DeJohnette
- Joe Sample
- Joe Satriani
- Lamb
- Leo Tardin
- Lionel Richie
- Lou Reed
- Lovebugs
- Martinho Da Vila
- Macy Gray
- Mos Def
- Nils Petter Molvaer
- Richard Bona
- Ruben Blades
- Salif Keita
- Shemekia Copeland
- Suzanne Vega
- The Manhattan Transfer
- Ute Lemper
- Will Calhoun
- Youssou N'Dour

=== 2001 ===
The 2001 edition of the festival featured performances of 51 artists:

- Alanis Morissette
- Avishai Cohen
- B.B. King
- Jeff Beck
- Bob Dylan
- Bobby McFerrin
- Brian May & Kerry Ellis
- Burning Spear
- Chick Corea
- Chris Botti
- Christian McBride
- Dean Brown
- Dianne Reeves
- Doug Wimbish
- Gary Moore
- George Duke
- Gilberto Gil
- Goldfrapp
- Herbie Hancock
- Horace Andy
- James Morrison (brass)
- Jimmy Page
- John McLaughlin
- Jorge Ben Jor
- Klaus Doldinger
- Larry Carlton
- Living Colour
- Manu Katché
- Marcus Miller
- Milton Nascimento
- Neil Cowley
- Neil Young
- Paco De Lucia
- Patti Smith
- Run DMC
- Rachelle Ferrell
- Richard Bona
- Robert Plant
- Saul Williams
- Shakti
- Sigur Rós
- Sting
- Talvin Singh
- Terri Lyne Carrington
- Terry Callier
- The Temptations
- Tricky
- Trilok Gurtu
- Van Morrison
- Wayne Shorter
- Will Calhoun
- Zakir Hussain

=== 2002 ===
The 2002 edition of the festival featured performances of 75 artists:

- Air
- Al Jarreau
- Amadou & Mariam
- Angie Stone
- Angélique Kidjo
- Antibalas Afrobeat Orchestra
- Asian Dub Foundation
- B.B. King
- Biréli Lagrène
- Buddy Guy
- Bush
- Caetano Veloso
- Cake
- Candy Dulfer
- Capleton
- Chris Rea
- Christian McBride
- Claude Nobs
- Cornelius
- Cornershop
- Daniela Mercury
- Dave Holland
- David Bowie
- David Sanborn
- Dennis Alcapone
- Detroit Innovators
- Diana Miranda
- DJ Logic
- Dreadzone
- Erykah Badu
- Esbjörn Svensson Trio
- Fred Galliano & The African Divas
- Gabrielle
- Garbage
- Gary Burton
- Gemma Hayes
- Goo
- Herbie Hancock
- Ike Turner
- Irmin Schmidt & Kumo
- Isaac Hayes
- Jamiroquai
- Joe Cocker
- Joe Sample
- Joe Satriani
- John Scofield
- João Bosco
- Keith Jarrett
- Makoto Ozone
- Mandrill
- Marianne Faithfull
- Mercury Rev
- Mirko Loko
- Miss Kittin
- Mt. Sims
- Muse
- Myslovitz
- Paul Simon
- Pierre Audetat
- Pierre-Yves Borgeaud
- Rahzel
- Ramon Valle
- Ratdog
- Richard Galliano
- Slayer
- Soulfly
- Speedy J
- Stephan Eicher
- Terri Lyne Carrington
- The Matthew Herbert Big Band
- The Notwist
- Thomas Dutronc
- UB40
- Us3
- Wanda Sá
- Watcha
- Wayne Shorter
- Youssou N'Dour

=== 2003 ===
The 2003 edition of the festival featured performances of 60 artists:

- Asher Selector
- Baptiste Trotignon Trio
- Beth Orton
- Blackalicious
- Brendan Benson
- Chico Cesar
- Craig David
- Cypress Hill
- Echoboy
- Falamansa
- George Benson
- Gilberto Gil
- Goldfrapp
- Herbert Grönemeyer
- Jacky Terrasson
- Jair Oliveira
- Jamiroquai
- Jethro Tull
- Jimi Tenor & Big Band
- Joe Jackson
- Joe Sample
- Laurent Garnier
- Laurie Anderson
- Lockdown Project
- Maria Bethânia
- Marius Vernescu
- Masha
- Mercan Dede
- Michel Jonasz
- Mick Hucknall
- Mirko Loko
- Mogwai
- Nada Surf
- Natalie Cole
- Noa
- Pierre Audetat
- Prince Alla
- Radiohead
- Randy Crawford
- Ray Parker Jr.
- Richard Galliano
- Simply Red
- Stereophonics
- Susheela Raman
- The Blues Brothers
- The Crusaders
- The Flaming Lips
- The Pretenders
- The Rapture
- The Roots
- Tom McRae
- Tony Bennett
- Tricky
- Tuck & Patti
- Turin Brakes
- Van Morrison
- Vivian
- Yes
- ZZ Top
- Zorg

=== 2004 ===
The 2004 edition of the festival featured performances of 105 artists:

- !!!
- 16 Horsepower
- Air
- Al Jarreau
- Alicia Keys
- Amp Fiddler
- André Ceccarelli
- Angélique Kidjo
- Archive
- Asher Selector
- Avril
- B.B. King
- Bang Gang
- Barbara Hendricks
- Blonde Redhead
- Bluechel & Von Deylen
- Bobby McFerrin
- Bobby Parker
- Bryan Ferry
- Carlos Santana
- Cheap Trick
- Chic
- Christian Scott
- Clarence "Gatemouth" Brown
- Deep Purple
- Dido
- Earl Thomas
- Erick Sermon
- Faithless
- Feist
- Gary Burton
- Gentleman
- George (aka Dr. Funkenstein) Clinton
- Gianna Nannini
- Gonzalo Rubalcaba
- Herbie Hancock
- Inga Swearingen
- James Taylor
- Jamie Cullum
- Jamie Oehlers
- John Scofield
- Jorge Ben Jor
- Joss Stone
- João Bosco
- Kings of Convenience
- Korn
- Little Dreams Foundation
- Louie Vega & His Elements of Life
- Luciano
- Madlib feat. Jay Dee
- Magnus Lindgren
- Michael von der Heide
- Michel Camilo Trio
- Mono
- Mos Def
- Natacha Atlas
- Nega
- Nicola Conte
- Nina Hagen
- Orchestra Baobab
- Os Paralamas do Sucesso
- Oumou Sangaré
- P.M.T.
- PJ Harvey
- Patti Austin
- Patti LaBelle
- Paul Jermaine
- Phil Collins
- Ralph Myerz & The Jack Herren Band
- Raul Midon
- Ravi Coltrane
- Renee Olstead
- Revelação
- Robi Weber
- Rokia Traoré
- Sandii
- Santana Salvador
- Scissor Sisters
- Seal
- Sean Paul
- Seeed
- Sens Unik
- Shakti
- Solomon Burke
- Soulsurvivors
- Stacey Kent
- Streichmusik Alder
- Suzanne Vega
- Talvin Singh
- The Bad Plus
- The Bees
- The Brown Sisters
- The Corrs
- The Divine Comedy & Lausanne Sinfonietta
- The Eighties Matchbox B-Line Disaster
- The Music
- The World Quintet
- Tigran Hamasyan
- Ute Lemper
- Van Morrison
- Wax Poetic
- Wayne Shorter
- Wire Daisies
- Yami Bolo
- Zakir Hussain
- Zucchero

=== 2005 ===
The 2005 edition of the festival featured performances of 110 artists:

- 5th Element Crew
- Al Di Meola
- Alice Cooper
- ...And You Will Know Us by the Trail of Dead
- Anna Serafinska
- Antal Pusztai
- Antony And The Johnsons
- Apocalyptica
- Arturo Sandoval
- Audioslave
- B.B. King
- Barrington Levy
- Beth Carvalho
- Big Pants
- Billy Preston
- Black Twang
- Blondie
- Bobby McFerrin
- Bonnie Prince Billy
- Booker T. Jones
- Brian Wilson
- Bright Eyes
- Chic
- Christoph Siegrist
- Cibelle
- CocoRosie
- Common
- Crosby, Stills & Nash
- Daniela Mercury
- David Rodigan
- Dean Brown
- Death In Vegas
- Doug Wimbish
- Eagles of Death Metal
- Eliane Elias
- Elvis Costello
- Emilíana Torrini
- Fantômas
- Fazıl Say
- Garbage
- George Benson
- George Duke
- Gonzales
- Grégoire Maret
- Harold López-Nussa Torres
- Heritage Orchestra
- Houston Swing Engine
- Ibrahim Ferrer
- Isaac Hayes
- Isis
- Ivete Sangalo
- James Blunt
- Jamie Lidell
- Jean Grae
- Jean-Luc Ponty
- Joanna Newsom
- Joe Sample
- John Medeski
- Jorge Aragao
- José Feliciano
- Juliette Gréco
- Kasabian
- Kraftwerk
- LCD Soundsystem
- Laura Pausini
- Lauryn Hill
- Leonid Agutin
- Lisa Stansfield
- Lovebugs
- M83
- Magnus Lindgren
- Margareth Menezes
- Marianne Faithfull
- McCoy Tyner
- Michel Jonasz
- Oscar Peterson
- Patti Smith
- Peter Cincotti
- Plantlife
- Queens Of The Stone Age
- Randy Crawford
- Raphael Saadiq
- Ravi Coltrane
- Ray Baretto
- Richard Bona
- Robert Botos
- Robert Cray
- Roberta Flack
- Saul Williams
- Seu Jorge
- Solomon Burke
- Soulwax
- Stanley Clarke
- Steps Ahead
- Steve Earle
- The Bravery
- The Corrs
- The Dears
- The Manhattan Transfer
- The Others
- The Roots
- The Young Gods
- Tom McRae
- Tom Zé
- Tori Amos
- Trio Grande
- Underworld
- Will Calhoun
- Zap Mama
- Zeca Pagodinho

=== 2006 ===
The 2006 edition of the festival featured performances of 99 artists:

- Adam Green
- Al Jarreau
- Amon Tobin
- Arthur H
- Atmosphere
- B.B. King
- Beverley Knight
- Bilal
- Brother Ali
- Bryan Adams
- Bugz In The Attic
- Chris Botti
- Clap Your Hands Say Yeah
- Cobblestone Jazz
- Curtis Stigers
- Davell Crawford
- David Walters
- Dean Brown
- Deep Purple
- Deftones
- Diana Krall
- Donovan
- Eek A Mouse
- Eels
- Erik Truffaz
- Fourplay
- George Duke
- Gilberto Gil
- Gotan project
- Gotthard
- Guess What
- Harold López-Nussa Torres
- Herbert & Dani Siciliano
- Herbie Hancock
- Horace Andy
- Iggy Pop & The Stooges
- Jack DeJohnette
- James Holden
- Kid Koala
- Klaus Doldinger
- Koop
- Kruger
- Larry Carlton
- Leela James
- Luciano
- Marcelo D2
- Maria Rita
- Martin Luther
- Martinho Da Vila
- Massive Attack
- Mathew Jonson
- Mick Hucknall
- Mogwai
- Morrissey
- Murcof
- Narodniki The Laptop Supergroup
- Nathan Fake
- New Orleans All Star
- Ney Matogrosso
- Nikoletta Szoke
- Omara Portuondo
- Paco De Lucia
- Paolo Conte
- Paolo Nutini
- Phat Kat and Pete Rock
- Poni Hoax
- Prince Buster
- Prince Malachi
- Q*bert
- Randy Crawford
- Raul Midon
- Richie Hawtin
- Royseven
- Sean Paul
- Sergio Mendes
- Sigur Rós
- Simply Red
- Soil & Pimp
- Solomon Burke
- Sons and Daughters
- Stanley Clarke
- Starch
- Starsailor
- Sting
- Talvin Singh
- Terry Callier
- Terry Callier and His Band
- The Clarke Duke Project
- The Harmony Harmoneers
- The Strokes
- Till Brönner
- Tower Of Power
- Tracy Chapman
- Trio Beyond
- Twinkle Brothers
- Van Morrison
- Venus
- Wire Daisies
- Zakir Hussain
- dEUS

=== 2007 ===
The 2007 edition of the festival featured performances of 84 artists:

- Abd Al Malik
- Al Jarreau
- Alceu Valença
- Asher Selector
- Beastie Boys
- Beck
- Beenie Man
- Beth Carvalho
- Beverley Knight
- Bilal
- Bonaparte
- Booker T. Jones
- Bouddha Monk
- Brad Mehldau
- Candy Dulfer
- Celyane
- Damon Albarn
- DJ James Holroyd
- Dr. John
- Electrelane
- Erik Truffaz
- Faithless
- Fauve & Raphelson
- Foreigner
- Francis Hime
- Galaxy 2 Galaxy
- Gary Burton
- George Benson
- Gianna Nannini
- Gomm
- Heaven & Hell
- Herman Dune
- Horace Andy
- Idrissa Diop
- India.Arie
- Isamel Lo
- Jake Hertzog
- Jimmy Cliff
- John Legend
- John Medeski
- John Scofield
- Keren Ann
- Kid Chocolat Vs Asia Argento
- Kristin Berardi
- Lambchop
- Larry Carlton
- Laurent Garnier
- Living Colour
- M. Ward
- Maria Bethânia
- Motörhead
- Mr Hudson & The Library
- Nemo
- Norah Jones
- Olodum
- Paolo Nutini
- Pet Shop Boys
- Pharoahe Monch
- Placebo
- Pop Levi
- Prince
- Raul Midon
- Rickie Lee Jones
- Robben Ford
- Rocé
- Roger Hodgson
- Saskia Laroo
- Seven
- Solomon Burke
- Son Of Dave
- Sophie Hunger
- Spank Rock
- The B-52's
- The Chemical Brothers
- The Good, the Bad & the Queen
- Tokyo Ska Paradise Orchestra
- Tori Amos
- Unkle
- Van Morrison
- Wilco
- Will Calhoun
- William White
- Wu-Tang Clan
- Youssou N'Dour

=== 2008 ===
The 2008 edition of the festival featured performances of 128 artists:

- A Few Good Men
- Adele
- Al Di Meola
- Alicia Keys
- Andy Milne & Grégoire Maret
- Asher Selector
- Ayekoo Drummers Ghana
- Azid Family
- Babyshambles
- Belleruche
- Billy Gibbons
- Blood Red Shoes
- Brendan Benson
- Brisa Roché
- Buddy Guy
- Buika
- CDL Jazz Orchestra
- CSS
- Camille
- Chaka Khan
- Chezidek
- Chick Corea
- Chico Cesar
- Dan Le Sac Vs Scroobius Pip
- Das Pop
- Davell Crawford
- Day One
- Deep Purple
- DJ Logic
- DJ Marky & Stamina MC
- EPMD
- Earl 16
- Eddy Grant
- Elba Ramalho
- Ellen Allien
- Erykah Badu
- Fiji
- Gilberto Gil
- Gnarls Barkley
- Gossip
- Greis
- Groove
- Hamilton De Holanda
- Herbie Hancock
- Hercules and Love Affair
- Hocus Pocus
- I.Trio
- Interpol
- James Moody
- Jamie Lidell
- Javier Limón
- Jill Scott
- Joan Baez
- Joe Jackson
- Joe Sample
- John Mayall & The Bluesbreakers
- Jonatha Brooke
- João Bosco
- Just Blaze
- Kassette
- Lenny Kravitz
- Lenny White
- Leonard Cohen
- Lightspeed Champion
- Madness
- Magnus Lindgren
- Mart'nália
- Melody Gardot
- Michael Rose
- Mick Hucknall
- Milton Nascimento & Trio Jobim
- Monty Alexander
- Moriarty
- N.E.R.D.
- Nana Mouskouri
- Naturally 7
- Nazareth
- Neon Neon
- Nils Landgren
- Nôze
- Otis Taylor
- Paolo Nutini
- Patti Austin
- Paul Jermaine
- Paulinho Da Costa
- Pepe Lienhard
- Petula Clark
- Pharrell Williams
- Grand Pianoramax
- Pitingo
- Prince Alla
- Quincy Jones
- Quique Neira
- Randy Crawford
- Return to Forever
- Richard Galliano
- Richard Galliano and Tangaria Quartet
- Robert Cray
- Roberta Flack
- Ryan Bingham
- Ryan Shaw
- Saigon (rapper)
- Sam Sparro
- Santigold
- Saxon
- Sheryl Crow
- Sly Johnson
- Sophie Hunger
- Sorgente
- Stanley Clarke
- Stevans
- Sylford Walker
- The Crusaders
- The Heavy
- The Kills
- The Kissaway Trail
- The National
- The Raconteurs
- The Rumble Strips
- The Ting Tings
- The Whip
- Tobias Preisig
- Tower Of Power
- Travis
- Valeska
- Vampire Weekend
- Yael Naïm
- k.d. Lang

=== 2009 ===
The 2009 edition of the festival featured performances of 136 artists:

- Adam Green
- Alain Clark
- Alela Diane
- Alice Cooper
- Alice Russell
- Allen Toussaint
- André Rio
- Angélique Kidjo
- Antony And The Johnsons
- Ayekoo Drummers Ghana
- B.B. King
- Baaba Maal
- Bettye LaVette
- Bill Evans
- Bill Laswell
- Birdy Nam Nam
- Bitty McLean
- Black Milk
- Blind Boys Of Alabama
- Bloc Party
- Boo Boo Davis
- CTI All Star Band 2009
- Chaka Khan
- Chickenfoot
- Chris Gall Trio feat. Enik
- Chucho Valdés
- Claude Nobs
- Cubanismo!
- Daniel Powter
- Dave Matthews Band
- David Sanborn
- Derek Trucks
- Diana Miranda
- Die Ärzte
- DJ Vincz Lee
- Earth, Wind & Fire
- Elew
- Elkee
- Emil Ibrahim Quartet
- Emily Loizeau
- Esser
- Everlast
- Flora Purim
- Francisco Mela
- Gadsbi
- General Elektriks
- George Benson
- George Duke
- Giovanni Hidalgo & Horacio Hernandez
- Grace Jones
- Harold López-Nussa Torres
- Herbie Hancock
- Herman Dune
- Hugh Coltman
- James Yuill
- Jamie Cullum
- Jedi Mind Tricks
- Jeff Beck
- Joe Satriani
- John Fogerty
- John McLaughlin
- John Scofield
- Josh Weller
- Kakkmaddafakka
- Kenny Babyface Edmonds
- Klaxons
- Kool & The Gang
- La Coka Nostra
- La Fouine
- Lang Lang
- Lee Ritenour
- Leila Arab
- Lily Allen
- Little Brother
- Lizz Wright
- MXX Allstar
- Madeleine Peyroux
- Magnus Lindgren
- Marcus Miller
- Marianne Faithfull
- Mc Coy Tyner Trio
- McCoy Tyner
- Melody Gardot
- Mingus
- Monty Alexander
- Mr. Lif
- Naive New Beaters
- Naturally 7
- New York Salsa All Stars
- Nils Landgren
- Nono Germano
- Noisettes
- Olivier Koundouno
- Oscar D'León
- OuterSpace
- Passion Pit
- Peter Cincotti
- Pony Pony Run Run
- Pop
- Prince
- Q-Tip
- Rachelle Ferrell
- Raphael Saadiq
- Ray Lema
- Ray Parker Jr.
- Scott Matthew
- Seal
- Sebastien Schuller
- Shakra
- Wayne Shorter
- Ska Nerfs
- Solange La Frange
- Solomon Burke
- Stanley Clarke
- Status Quo
- Steely Dan
- Stephan Eicher
- Steve Winwood
- Susan Tedeschi
- Sweet Georgia Brown
- Take Me Home
- Talib Kweli
- The Asteroids Galaxy Tour
- The Bewitched Hand
- The Black Eyed Peas
- The Rakes
- The Sound of the Fridge
- The Swedish ACT Allstars
- Third World
- Trybez
- Underworld
- Variety Lab
- We Have Band
- Wyclef Jean
- Yuksek
- Zulfugar Baghirov Quartet
- Zurich University Of Arts
- finn & Eicher

=== 2010 ===
The 2010 edition of the festival featured performances of 108 artists:

- Aeroplane
- Air
- Al Jarreau
- Alfredo Rodriguez
- Angélique Kidjo
- Aṣa
- Baaba Maal
- Beach House
- Ben Harper
- Billy Cobham
- Billy Idol
- Blood Red Shoes
- Brad Mehldau
- Brian Wilson
- Broken Bells
- Bryan Ferry
- Buddy Guy
- Charlotte Gainsbourg
- Chew Lips
- Chick Corea
- Chris Garneau
- Christian McBride
- Chromeo
- CocoRosie
- Cody
- Damian Marley
- De La Soul
- Delphic
- Diana Krall
- Eli "Paperboy" Reed and The True Loves
- Elvis Costello
- Emmanuelle Seigner
- Erykah Badu
- Fanfarlo
- Francisco Mela
- Féfé
- Gary Moore
- Ghinzu Club Show
- Gigi Radics
- Gil Scott-Heron
- Gildas
- Ginger Ninja
- Greg Phillinganes
- Herbie Hancock
- Horace Andy
- Isfar Sarabski
- Jack DeJohnette
- James Walsh
- Jamie Lidell
- Janelle Monáe
- Jessye Norman
- Joe Bonamassa
- John & Jehn
- John McLaughlin
- Julian Lage
- Julian Sartorius
- Kasper Bjoerke
- Katie Melua
- Keb' Mo'
- Kiss Kiss Kiss
- Klaus Doldinger
- Lionel Loueke
- Mark Knopfler
- Martina Topley-Bird
- Max Passante
- Mick Hucknall
- Midlake
- Midnight Juggernauts
- Missy Elliott
- Moonraisers
- Mumford and Sons
- Nas
- Norah Jones
- Oy
- Paco De Lucia
- Paulinho Da Costa
- Pepe Lienhard
- Petula Clark
- Phil Collins
- Piano Club
- Quincy Jones
- Regina Spektor
- Revolver
- Richard Bona
- Roger Cicero
- Roxy Music
- Roy Hargrove
- Seven
- Shantel & Bucovina Club Orkestar
- Shy Child
- Skip The Use
- Sophie Hunger
- Steve Mason
- The Awkwards
- The Black Box Revelation
- The Dead Weather
- The Drums
- The Maccabees
- The Mondrians
- The Twelves
- Tori Amos
- Tricky
- Two Rocks Band
- Uffie
- Vampire Weekend
- Vanessa Paradis
- Willy Mason
- Yacht
- Yaron Herman
- Youssou N'Dour

=== 2011 ===
The 2011 edition of the festival featured performances of 142 artists:

- Afrika Bambaataa
- Alfredo Rodriguez
- Aloe Blacc
- Alpha Blondy
- Ana Carolina
- Andreas Vollenweider
- Anna Calvi
- Arcade Fire
- Arthur H
- Aṣa
- B.B. King
- Barem
- Bilal
- Black Dub
- Bo Tox
- Boogers
- Bootsy Collins
- Brigitte
- Cobblestone Jazz
- Camille O'Sullivan
- Carlos Santana
- Carly Connor
- Cascadeur
- Chaka Khan
- Chapel Club
- Charles Bradley
- Chick Corea
- Christian McBride
- Christina Maria
- Claude Nobs
- Cody Chesnutt
- Cold War Kids
- Coolio
- Crocodiles
- Crystal Fighters
- Dave Grusin
- David Sanborn
- Deep Purple
- Derek Trucks
- Diana Krall
- Digital Underground
- Donavon Frankenreiter
- Dr. John
- Emily Bear
- Erik Truffaz
- Erika Stucky
- Esperanza Spalding
- Everlast
- Fatima
- Fauve
- Femi Kuti
- Figurines
- Francisco Mela
- Frank Gambale
- Fred Lilla
- Friendly Fires
- Funeral Party
- George Benson
- Gerd Janson
- Gigi Radics
- Guano Apes
- Harold López-Nussa Torres
- Herbie Hancock
- House Of Pain
- Housse de Racket
- Imany
- Irma
- Jack Savoretti
- James Blake
- James Vincent McMorrow
- Jamie Woon
- Jean-Luc Ponty
- Jimmy Cliff
- Joe Sample
- John McLaughlin
- Katy B
- Lamb
- Larry Graham
- Laura Marling
- Lee Ritenour
- Lenny White
- Leon Russell
- Liza Minnelli
- Make It Pink
- Marcus Miller
- Maria Gadú
- Maria Rita
- Mario Biondi
- Melissa Auf der Maur
- MF Doom
- Milow
- Milow The Girl
- Mogwai
- Monty Alexander
- Nasser
- Natalie Cole
- Naughty By Nature
- Nicolas Jaar
- Oh Land
- Olivia Pedroli
- Pantha Du Prince
- Paolo Nutini
- Patti Austin
- Paul Simon
- Philipp Fankhauser
- Quincy Jones
- Randy Crawford
- Raphael Saadiq
- Raul Midon
- Reptile and Retard
- Richard Bona
- Ricky Martin
- Robert Glasper Experiment
- Robert Randolph
- Ruben Blades
- Sanem Kalfa
- Seal
- Sly Johnson
- Sonny Emory
- Sophie Hunger
- St. Vincent
- Stanley Clarke
- Stef Kamil Clarens
- Sting
- Susan Tedeschi
- The Pretty Reckless
- The Shoes
- The Skatalites
- The Vaccines
- Tigran Hamasyan
- Tom Silverman
- Tommy Lipuma
- Trilok Gurtu
- Trixie Whitley
- Trombone Shorty
- Villagers
- Vinnie Who
- Vouipe
- Wayne Shorter
- Wu Lyf
- Youssou N'Dour
- Ziggy Marley

=== 2012 ===
The 2012 edition of the festival featured performances of 125 artists:

- 69 Chambers
- Active Child
- Adriana Calcanhotto
- AfroCubism
- Alabama Shakes
- Alanis Morissette
- Alex Clare
- Alfredo Rodriguez
- Amy Macdonald
- Andreas Varady
- Asbjorn
- Axelle Red
- Bastian Baker
- Bebe Winans
- Bob Dylan
- Bob James
- Bobby McFerrin
- Bombay Bicycle Club
- Bon Homme
- Breton
- Buddy Guy
- Butterscotch
- Buvette
- Chiara Izzi
- Chic
- Chicago Blues
- Chick Corea
- Chris Cornell
- Cidade Negra
- Citizens!
- College
- Diana Miranda
- Django Django
- Dr. John
- Ed Sheeran
- Electric Guest
- Emeli Sandé
- Erykah Badu
- First Aid Kit
- Four Tet
- Fourplay
- Frànçois and The Atlas Mountains
- Garland Jeffreys
- George Gruntz
- Giana Factory
- Gigi Radics
- Gilberto Gil
- Grace Jones
- Herbert Grönemeyer
- Herbie Hancock
- Hugh Laurie
- Isfar Sarabski
- James Carter Organ Trio
- Jamie N Commons
- Janelle Monáe
- Jessie J
- Jethro Tull
- Joe Bonamassa
- John McLaughlin
- John Medeski
- Jorge Ben Jor
- Juliette Gréco
- Kassav'
- Katie Melua
- Kavinsky
- Kimbra
- King Charles
- La Femme
- Labrinth
- Lana Del Rey
- Laura Leishman
- Lawson
- Lescop
- Lilabungalow
- Lionel Loueke
- Little Feat
- Luiz Melodia
- M.I.A.
- Mani Hoffman
- Mark Ronson
- Marlon Roudette
- Melody Gardot
- Michael Kiwanuka
- Nada Surf
- Nadeah
- Neil Cowley
- Neneh Cherry
- Nick Waterhouse
- Nightwish
- Niki & The Dove
- Nile Rodgers
- Noel Gallagher
- Odezenne
- Other Lives
- Paco De Lucia
- Pat Metheny
- Philipp Fankhauser
- Pitbull
- Poliça
- Quincy Jones
- Quinn Sullivan
- Radiorifle
- Rufus Wainwright
- Rumer
- Sarah Marie Young
- Sebastien Tellier
- Sergio Mendes
- Shearwater
- Soko
- Spectrum Road
- Taj Mahal
- The Brandt Bauer Frick Ensemble
- The National Fanfare Of Kadebostany
- The Pedrito Martinez Group
- The Young Professionals
- Theme Park
- Tiger And Wood
- Tony Bennett
- Totally Enormous Extinct Dinosaurs
- Trombone Shorty
- Van Morrison
- We Have Band
- Woodkid
- X X X Y
- Youssoupha

=== 2013 ===
The 2013 edition of the festival featured performances of 117 artists:

- Alborosie
- Alex Hepburn
- AlunaGeorge
- Andrea Oliva
- Angel Haze
- Avishai Cohen
- BadBadNotGood
- Ben Harper
- Ben Howard
- Ben Miller Band
- Billy Gibbons
- Black Rebel Motorcycle Club
- Bob James
- Bobby Womack
- Bonnie Raitt
- Brian May & Kerry Ellis
- Cat Power
- Charles Bradley
- Charles Lloyd
- Charlie Musselwhite
- Chief
- Chucho Valdés
- Claudia Leitte
- Daughter
- Dave Grusin
- Deep Purple
- Deluxe
- Devendra Banhart
- Diana Krall
- Dieter Meier
- Dinosaur Jr.
- Editors
- Eric Harland
- Flume
- Flying Lotus
- François Lindemann
- Gal Costa
- George Benson
- George Thorogood & The Destroyers
- Girls In Hawaii
- Grace Kelly Quintet
- Green Day
- Gregory Porter
- Hollie Cook
- Hugh Coltman
- IAM
- Iiro Rantala
- Jake Bugg
- James Blake
- James Morrison
- Jazz Funk Legends
- Joe Cocker
- Joe Sample
- Jonathan Batiste And The Stay Human
- Joris Delacroix
- José James
- Juveniles
- Kat Edmonson
- Kendrick Lamar and Band
- Koqa
- Kraftwerk
- Kurt Rosenwinkel
- La Velle And Friends
- Larry Graham
- Lee Ritenour
- Leonard Cohen
- Leszek Mozdzer
- Lianne La Havas
- Marc Sway
- Marcus Miller
- Mark Lanegan Band
- Melodys Echo Chamber
- Michael Wollny
- Misja Fitzgerald Michel
- Of Monsters And Men
- Oleta Adams
- Olivier Koundouno
- Om Unit
- Orthodox Celts
- Paolo Conte
- Patrick Watson
- Patti Austin
- Paul Jackson Trio
- Paul Kalkbrenner
- Pee Wee Ellis
- Peter Von Poehl
- Philipp Fankhauser
- Prince
- Randy Crawford
- Richie Hawtin
- Rodriguez
- Rone
- Sadie And The Hotheads
- Seth Troxler
- Shemekia Copeland
- Shuggie Otis
- Sting
- Sugar Blue
- Superpoze
- Take 6
- The Hives
- The James Hunter Six
- The Lumineers
- The Parov Stelar Band
- Till Brönner
- Tobias Preisig
- Tony Joe White
- Trixie Whitley
- Tulipa Ruiz
- Twin Atlantic
- Two Door Cinema Club
- Valerie June
- Vijay Iyer Trio
- Wyclef Jean
- Yan Wagner
- Youn Sun Nah Duo
- ZZ Top
- Zakir Hussain

=== 2014 ===
The 2014 edition of the festival featured performances of 163 artists:

- -M- (Matthieu Chedid)
- Adriatique
- Agnes Obel
- Akikazu Nakamura Forest
- Alim Quasimov Ensemble
- Amy Macdonald
- Angus & Julia Stone
- Annakin
- Antibalas Afrobeat Orchestra
- Archie Bronson Outfit
- Archive
- As Animals
- Ayo
- Babyshambles
- Banks
- Barnt
- Bastian Baker
- Benjamin Clementine
- Benoit Delbecq
- Biréli Lagrène
- Blue Note Tokyo All Star Orchestra
- Blues Pills
- Booker T. Jones
- Bosco Delrey
- Buddy Guy
- Buika
- Burhan Oçal
- Camion
- Charles Bradley
- Chet Faker
- Cheyenne
- Chris Rea
- Damon Albarn
- Daniel Avery
- Danton Eeprom
- Dark Horses
- Darkside
- Dave Grusin
- Dave Holland
- Derek Trucks
- Didier Lockwood
- Dirty Loops
- Downtown Boogie
- Dr. John
- Drenge
- Ed Sheeran
- Eels
- Eric Harland
- Etienne Daho
- Everlast
- Fat White Family
- Fauve
- Fingertrap
- Fink
- Forks
- François Lindemann
- Goldfrapp
- Gramatik
- H Zettrio
- Harri Stojka & Hot Club De Vienne
- Herbie Hancock
- Hiromi Uehara
- Horace Andy
- Hotei
- Isfar Sarabski
- Iván "Melon" Lewis
- Jack DeJohnette
- Jack Savoretti
- Jamie Cullum
- Javier Limón
- Jerry Leonide
- Joey Badass
- John Scofield
- Julian Sartorius
- Jungle
- Kaytranada
- Keb' Mo'
- Kruger
- Kuroma
- Laura Mvula
- Leandro Pellegrino
- Lee Ritenour
- Leo Tardin
- Leszek Mozdzer
- Lizz Wright
- London Grammar
- Lorenz Kellhuber
- Louisahhh
- Lucas Ramirez
- Lykke Li
- MGMT
- Mac Miller
- Maceo Parker
- Maceo Plex
- Magos & Limón
- Manu Katché
- Manu Lanvin
- Massive Attack
- Matias Aguayo
- Mavis Staples
- Melanie De Biasio
- Melissa Laveaux
- Metronomy
- Michael Kiwanuka
- Michael Mayer
- Mighty Oaks
- Milky Chance
- Miyavi
- Moderat
- Monsieur Monsieur
- Monty Alexander
- Morcheeba
- Mulatu Astatke
- Myrczek Wojtek
- NTO
- Neil Cowley
- Nicolas Jaar
- Norma Jean Martine
- Oh! Tiger Mountain
- OutKast
- Paloma Faith
- Passenger
- Peter Cincotti
- Pharrell Williams
- Plaistow
- Prism
- Quincy Jones
- Quinn Sullivan
- RY X
- Ravi Coltrane
- Redlie
- Ricardo Villalobos
- Richard Bona
- Richard Galliano
- Robert Plant
- Robin Thicke
- Rocky
- Rodrigo Y Gabriela
- Selah Sue
- Sharon Jones
- Sohn
- Sonny Catanese
- Sonny Emory
- Stephan Eicher
- Stevie Wonder
- Susan Tedeschi
- Sweet Georgia Brown
- Tale Of Us
- Temples
- Terri Lyne Carrington
- Terri Lyne Carrington and the Mosaic Project
- The Beauty of Gemina
- The Daptone Super Soul Revue
- The Jezabels
- The Revox
- The Trap
- Thomas Dutronc
- Tigran Hamasyan
- Tiken Jah Fakoly
- Van Morrison
- Von Pariahs
- Wayne Shorter
- Wojciech Myrczek
- Woodkid
- Yaron Herman
- Òlafur Arnalds

=== 2015 ===
The 2015 edition of the festival featured performances of 158 artists:

- -M- (Matthieu Chedid)
- A Bu
- ASAP Rocky
- AaRON
- Al Jarreau
- Alabama Shakes
- Alex Goodman
- Alita Moses
- Aloe Blacc
- Amiyna Farouque
- André Rio
- Anna Calvi
- Asaf Avidan
- Avishai Cohen
- Barrio Latino
- Baxter Dury
- Ben Klock
- Benjamin Booker
- Birth Of Joy
- Bob Spring
- Brodinski
- Bugge Wesseltoft
- Buraka Som Sistema
- Caetano Veloso
- Canto Cego
- Carlos Santana
- Caro Emerald
- Chick Corea
- Christian McBride
- Climax Blues Band
- D'Angelo
- Damien Rice
- David August
- David Sanborn
- David Tixier
- Dhafer Youssef
- Diana Miranda
- Dianne Reeves
- Die Antwoord
- Downtown Boogie
- Dub Inc
- Emeli Sandé
- Erik Truffaz
- Fakear
- Foals
- Foxygen
- Fred Wesley
- Fritz Kalkbrenner
- Fumaça Preta
- George Benson
- George Ezra
- Gilberto Gil
- Ginkgoa
- Giufa
- Hector Quintana
- Herbie Hancock
- Hiatus Kaiyote
- Hot Chip
- Hudson Mohawke
- Hugh Coltman
- Ibeyi
- Jack Garratt
- Jackson Browne
- Jacob Collier
- James Blake
- James Vincent McMorrow
- Jamie xx
- Jason Moran
- Jerry Leonide
- John Dear
- John Legend
- John McLaughlin
- John Talabot
- Joke
- Joshua Redman
- Justin Kauflin
- Kabak
- KiNK
- Kid Wise
- Kill It Kid
- Kurt Rosenwinkel
- Kwabs
- Lady Gaga
- Lenny Kravitz
- Lilly Wood & The Prick
- Lionel Richie
- Liv Warfield And The NPG Hornz
- Lizz Wright
- Lorenz Kellhuber
- Los Lobos
- Lost Frequencies
- Louis, Matthieu, Joseph & Anna Chedid
- MXD
- Marc Kelly
- Maria Gadú
- Marmozets
- Mary J. Blige
- Mathis Picard
- Matias Aguayo
- Matthieu Chedid
- Melody Gardot
- Minuit
- Monica Heldal
- Nick Mulvey
- Nikki Hill
- Nils Frahm
- Nils Petter Molvaer
- Odesza
- Oscar and the Wolf
- Out of Law
- Paolo Nutini
- Paralog And Gabriel Zufferey
- Paula Grande
- Pierre Omers Swing Revue
- Polar
- Portishead
- Protoje and the Indiggnation
- Rae Morris
- Ruthie Foster
- Sbtrkt
- Sam Smith
- Sebastien Schuller
- Serpentyne
- Sinéad O'Connor
- Sly And Robbie
- Soak
- Somi
- Songhoy Blues
- Sophie Hunger
- Suns Of Thyme
- T'Dòz
- Taken By Storm
- Teki Latex & Orgasmic
- The Avener
- The Chemical Brothers
- The Gentle Storm
- The Kooks
- The Staves
- The Two
- The Vintage Caravan
- The War On Drugs
- Thought Forms
- Thylacine
- Tobey Lucas
- Tobias Preisig
- Tommy Castro
- Tony Bennett
- Toto
- Trio Da Kali
- Unknown Mortal Orchestra
- Vein
- Wolfman
- Yaron Herman
- Yoav Eshed
- Zaz
- Ziv Ravitz
- alt-J
- dEUS

=== 2016 ===
The 2016 edition of the festival featured performances of 110 artists:

- ASAP Ferg
- Academie Suisse De Cor Des Alpes
- Alex Attias
- Allah-Las
- Amine Mraihi
- Antonio Farao
- Apollonia
- Aruan Ortiz Trio
- Aurora
- Basia Bulat
- Beirut
- Bill Evans
- Carolyn Wonderland
- Cécile McLorin Salvant
- Chico Freeman
- Crows
- DBFC
- Dalton Telegramme
- Dave Holland
- Dennis Chambers
- DJ Shadow
- Dobet Gnahoré
- Ernest Ranglin and Friends
- Esteban Castro
- FKJ
- Fai Baba
- Fanny Leeb
- Feu! Chatterton
- Floating Points
- Flume
- Four Tet
- François Lindemann
- French Quarter
- Garfield High School Jazz Ensemble
- Georgio
- Gipsy Sound System Orkestra
- Glen Hansard
- Glen Matlock
- Gogo Penguin
- Grimes
- Haelos
- Han Seung Seok & Jung Jaeil
- Heymoonshaker
- I Kong And Njavibes
- Jack Broadbent
- Jean-Michel Jarre
- Jeanne Added
- Jeremy Loops
- Joe Farmer
- José González
- Kenny Barron
- Kiasmos
- Kilmister
- Kurt Vile & The Violators
- Lana Del Rey
- Laolu
- Last Train
- Le Flappers Burlesque Show On Tour
- Les Innocents
- Lisa Simone
- Little Dreams Band
- Lola Marsh
- Lou Doillon
- Lura
- MHD
- Matt Corby
- Max Cooper
- Max Jury
- Meshuggah
- Montreux Jazz Choir
- Mura Masa
- Nadja Zela
- Nathaniel Ratellif And The Night Sweats
- Nik Bartsch
- PJ Harvey
- Peter Kernel
- Petit Biscuit
- Rag'n'Bone Man
- Randy Weston
- Richard Bona & Mandekan Cubano
- Robben Ford
- Selwyn Birchwood
- Sigur Rós
- Simply Red
- Son Lux
- Stade
- The Animen
- The Deaf
- The Jerry Khan Bangers
- The K.
- The Moorings
- The Peacoks
- The Two Romans
- The Wild Guys
- Thimothy Jaromir
- Trio Teriba
- Ty Dolla Sign
- Ulf Wakenius
- Vald
- Vanessa Da Mata
- Verna Von Horsten
- Vintage Trouble
- Volcan
- What You Know
- Woodkid
- Yak
- Young Thug
- ZZ Top
- Zappa The Black Page Experience
- Ziv Ravitz
- Ásgeir

=== 2017 ===
The 2017 edition of the festival featured performances of 66 artists:

- Ambrose Akinmusire
- Bachspace
- Benjamin Biolay
- Bonobo
- Casey
- Charlie Cunningham
- Chilly Gonzales
- Cigarettes After Sex
- Donny McCaslin Quartet
- Elmhurst College Jazz Band
- Esteban Castro
- Federico Albanese
- File Under Zawinul
- Flatbush Zombies
- Fleet Foxes
- Gabriel Garzón-Montano
- Gucci Mane
- Hamilton Leithauser
- Ibrahim Maalouf
- Imelda Gabs
- Jacob Karlzon
- Jacques
- Joey Alexander Trio
- John Newman
- Junior Tshaka
- Kery James
- Kevin Morby
- Macy Gray
- Maggie Rogers
- Makala
- Malika Favre
- Max Richter
- Muthoni Drummer Queen
- Nicolas Cruz
- Nicolas Jaar
- Nicolas Noir
- Noa Duo
- Olli Hirvonen
- Paradis
- Pedestrians
- Peter Broderick
- Phoenix
- Ramsey Lewis
- Romare
- Roméo Elvis
- Roosevelt
- Royal Blood
- Sampha
- Sarah McKenzie
- Sax Summit
- Shabaka and the Ancestors
- Slaves
- Slimka
- Soulwax
- Superwak Clique
- Tash Sultana
- The Bloody Beetroots
- The Lemon Twigs
- The New Power Generation
- Theo Croker
- Tia Brazda
- Tom Jones
- Usher and The Roots
- Whitney
- Wolfgang Muthspiel
- Youngr

=== 2018 ===
The 2018 edition of the festival was held on June 29 to July 14.

Auditorium Stravinski	Montreux Jazz Lab	Montreux Jazz Club
29 June 2018
Paolo Conte; Étienne Daho	Nils Frahm; Valgeir Sigurðsson; Moses Sumney	John Cale & Band + Sinfonietta de Lausanne; Pomme
30 June 2018
Zucchero Fornaciari; Aloe Blacc	Caballero & JeanJass; Moha La Squale; Hamza; Deen Burbigo; La Smala	Matthew Herbert Big Band; Faraj Suleiman
1 July 2018
Angus & Julia Stone	Odesza; The Blaze	Stanley Clarke Band; Roosevelt Collier
2 July 2018
Massive Attack; Young Fathers; Azekel	Charlotte Gainsbourg; Flavien Berger	Brad Mehldau Trio; Fleurine and Boys from Brazil
3 July 2018
Iggy Pop; The Vaccines	Gary Clark Jr.; Leon Bridges; Mahalia	Selah Sue; Jade Bird
4 July 2018
Deep Purple; The Temperance Movement	Portugal. The Man; Mashrou' Leila; L'Impératrice	Eivind Aarset; Dhafer Youssef
5 July 2018
Hollywood Vampires; Billy Idol	Gojira; Zeal & Ardor; Igorrr	Seu Jorge; João Bosco & Hamilton de Holanda Duo
6 July 2018
N.E.R.D.; Duckwrth	James Bay; Adam Naas; Tamino	Avishai Cohen; Jason Moran
7 July 2018
Gilberto Gil; Mart'nália; Margareth Menezes	Alice in Chains; Emma Ruth Rundle	Jaël; Freya Ridings
8 July 2018
Queens of the Stone Age; The Last Internationale	Brigitte; Juliette Armanet; Voyou	Quincy B-Day Party; R+R=NOW; Alfredo Rodríguez; Alexander Lövmark
9 July 2018
Nine Inch Nails; Gary Numan	Khalid; Jorja Smith; Jacob Banks	Manu Katché; Avishai Cohen Big Vicious; Addison Frei
10 July 2018
Jack White; Trombone Shorty & Orleans Avenue	Ben Howard; First Aid Kit; Isaac Gracie	Gregory Porter; Charles Pasi
11 July 2018
Steve Winwood; Van Morrison	Tyler, the Creator; Playboi Carti; ASAP Twelvyy	Cory Henry & The Funk Apostles; Hugh Coltman
12 July 2018
Nick Cave and the Bad Seeds; Anna von Hausswolff	Rone; Jon Hopkins; Hauschka	Philipp Fankhauser; Kenny Neal; Kasper Agnas
13 July 2018
Jamie Cullum; Imelda May	Lomepal; Angèle; Flèche Love	Chick Corea Trio; Montreux Jazz Academy Concert/Bugge Wesseltoft
14 July 2018
Jamiroquai; Deetron	Peggy Gou; KiNK; Master at Work; Carl Craig Synthesizer Ensemble; Mirko Loko	Ólafur Arnalds; Mammal Hands

=== 2019 ===
The 2019 edition of the festival saw Elton John offer a historic show at Saussaz Stadium before 15,000 people. This is the festival's first-ever stadium concert.

Auditorium Stravinski	Montreux Jazz Club	Montreux Jazz Lab
28 June
Sting; Bang Bang Romeo	—N/a	Ibeyi; Fatoumata Diawara; Nicola Cruz
29 June
Stade de la Saussaz	Seun Kuti & Egypt 80; Soweto Kinch Quartet	Dixon; Gerd Janson; Robert Hood & Lyric present Floorplan; Red Axes; Ramin & Reda
Elton John	Seun Kuti & Egypt 80; Soweto Kinch Quartet	Dixon; Gerd Janson; Robert Hood & Lyric present Floorplan; Red Axes; Ramin & Reda
30 June
Janet Jackson	Bobby McFerrin; Rahh	Snarky Puppy; Blackwave.; Chassol
1 July
Slash featuring Myles Kennedy and the Conspirators; Rival Sons	Chilly Gonzales	Dermot Kennedy; Lewis Capaldi
2 July
ZZ Top; Kenny Wayne Shepherd Band	Chilly Gonzales	Cat Power; Khruangbin
3 July
Joan Baez	Ivan Lins; Coladera with Marcos Suzano	Jungle; Clara Luciani; Masego
4 July
Thom Yorke Tomorrow's Modern Boxes; Andrea Belfi	Robben Ford; Melvin Taylor	James Blake; Sevdaliza
5 July
George Ezra; Faouzia	Melody Gardot; Jasper Steverlinck	Apparat; David August; Monolink
6 July
Rag'n'Bone Man; Dennis Lloyd	Billy Cobham; Christian Scott aTunde Adjuah	SCH; PLK; Maes; Koba LaD; Soolking
7 July
Bon Iver; Julien Baker	Yann Tiersen	FKJ; Tom Misch; Loyle Carner
8 July
The Chemical Brothers	Amadou & Mariam and The Blind Boys of Alabama; Gyedu-Blay Ambolley	Rita Ora; Mahmood
9 July
Tom Jones; Tower of Power	Joe Jackson	Mac DeMarco; Jacob Collier
10 July
Anita Baker	Youn Sun Nah Trio; Vincent Peirani	Suicideboys; Scarlxrd; Night Lovell
11 July
Janelle Monáe; Lizzo	Terence Blanchard; Braxton Cook; Montreux Jazz Academy Concert	Eddy de Pretto; Grace Carter
12 July
Ms. Lauryn Hill; Jalen N'Gonda	Chick Corea; Linda May Han Oh	Ben Klock; Chloé; Modeselektor; Ben UFO B2B Joy Orbison; Psycho Weazel
13 July
Quincy Jones	José James; Kimberose	Columbine; L'Or du Commun; Suzane

=== 2022 ===
The 2022 edition marked the festival's return after two-year break due to the COVID-19 pandemic.

Auditorium Stravinski	Montreux Jazz Lab
1 July
A-ha; Westerman	Faber; Sophie Hunger; Dino Brandão
2 July
Nick Cave and the Bad Seeds; Emilie Zoé	Years & Years; Iliona; Pierre de Maere
3 July
Björk Orkestral with Sinfonietta de Lausanne	Clairo; Tom Rosenthal; November Ultra
4 July
John Legend; Yola	Anitta; Mimi Webb
5 July
Paolo Nutini; Sabrina Claudio	Mitski; Self Esteem
6 July
Gregory Porter; Melody Gardot	Michael Kiwanuka; Black Pumas; Gabriels
7 July
Juanes; Rodrigo y Gabriela	Marc Rebillet; Nubya Garcia; Lady Blackbird
8 July
Dutronc & Dutronc	Laylow; Luidji
9 July
Diana Ross; Ian Ash	Fred again..; Odezenne; Tinashe
10 July
Woodkid; Lous and the Yakuza	Girl in Red; Ashnikko; The Regrettes
11 July
Alan Parsons Live Project; John McLaughlin and the 4th Dimension with Jany McPherson	Stormzy; Celeste
12 July
Måneskin; Crawlers	The Smile; Robert Stillman
13 July
Robert Plant & Alison Krauss; Mighty Oaks	Oboy; Ziak; Lala &ce; Guy2Bezbar; La Fève
14 July
Ibrahim Maalouf: Capacity to Love; Asaf Avidan	GoldLink; Nicki Nicole; Rejjie Snow
15 July
Jeff Beck; Van Morrison	Parcels; Loyle Carner; Yussef Dayes
16 July
Herbie Hancock; Jamie Cullum	Phoebe Bridgers; Patrick Watson; Arlo Parks

=== 2023 ===
Auditorium Stravinski	Montreux Jazz Lab
30 June
Simply Red; Tom Odell	Rüfüs Du Sol; Jimi Jules
1 July
Bob Dylan: Rough and Rowdy Ways	Zola; SDM; Kerchak; So La Lune; Khali
2 July
Chris Isaak; Bastian Baker	Dean Lewis; Calum Scott; Stacey Ryan
3 July
Lionel Richie; NNAVY	Caroline Polachek; Cavetown; Gayle
4 July
Lil Nas X	Rema; Ayra Starr
5 July
Sam Smith; Pip Millett	Christine and the Queens; Freya Ridings
6 July
Iggy Pop; Generation Sex: Billy Idol, Steve Jones, Tony James & Paul Cook	The Rose; Maisie Peters; Ethan Bortnick
7 July
Gilberto Gil & Family; Roberta Sá	Worakls Orchestra; Guillaume Poncelet
8 July
Sofiane Pamart; Chilly Gonzales	Tamino; Hermanos Gutiérrez; Katie Gregson-MacLeod
9 July
Jon Batiste; Jacob Collier	Juliette Armanet; Joesef
10 July
Norah Jones; Mavis Staples	Idles; Wet Leg; Lovejoy
11 July
Maluma; Emilia Mernes	The Teskey Brothers; Jacob Banks; Joy Oladokun
12 July
Seal; Morcheeba	Ava Max; La Zarra
13 July
Marcus Miller; Pat Metheny with Chris Fishman & Joe Dyson	Loyle Carner; Gabriels; Olivia Dean
14 July
Joe Bonamassa; Buddy Guy	Overmono; The Blaze
15 July
Nile Rodgers & Chic; Cory Wong	Mark Ronson & His Favourite Band Ever with special guests Yebba and Lucky Daye

== Artists with most performances ==
=== 27 times ===
- Herbie Hancock (1979, 1981, 1983, 1986–1994, 1996–1999, 2001, 2002, 2004, 2006, 2008–2012, 2014, 2015)

=== 21 times ===
- B.B. King (1979, 1980, 1982, 1984, 1987, 1989–1991, 1993, 1995, 1997–2002, 2004–2006, 2009, 2011)

=== 18 times ===
- George Duke (1976, 1977, 1986–1989, 1991–1993, 1996–2001, 2005, 2006, 2009)
- John McLaughlin (1974, 1976–1978, 1981, 1984, 1987, 1993, 1995, 1996, 1998, 1999, 2001, 2009–2012, 2015)
- Van Morrison (1974, 1980, 1984, 1989, 1990, 1994–1999, 2001, 2003, 2004, 2006, 2007, 2012, 2014)

=== 17 times ===
- Al Jarreau (1976, 1979–1981, 1986, 1990, 1991, 1993, 1996, 1998, 2000, 2002, 2004, 2006, 2007, 2010, 2015)

=== 16 times ===
- George Benson (1986, 1988–1991, 1995, 1996, 1998, 2000, 2003, 2005, 2007, 2009, 2011, 2013, 2015)

=== 15 times ===
- David Sanborn (1981, 1984, 1986, 1988, 1990, 1991, 1993, 1996, 1997, 1999, 2000, 2002, 2009, 2011, 2015)

=== 14 times ===
- Monty Alexander (1976, 1977, 1981, 1984, 1987, 1988, 1993–1995, 1997, 2008, 2009, 2011, 2014)

=== 13 times ===
- Gilberto Gil (1978, 1982, 1986, 1991, 1993, 1997, 1998, 2001, 2003, 2006, 2008, 2012, 2015)
- John Scofield (1975, 1976, 1984–1986, 1993, 1994, 1997, 2002, 2004, 2007, 2009, 2014)
- Stanley Clarke (1972, 1977, 1980, 1988, 1989, 1991, 1994, 1999, 2005, 2006, 2008, 2009, 2011)
- Wayne Shorter (1976, 1979, 1986, 1988, 1990–1992, 1996, 2001, 2002, 2004, 2011, 2014)

=== 12 times ===
- Chick Corea (1972, 1979, 1981, 1988, 1993, 1997, 2001, 2008, 2010–2012, 2015)

=== 11 times ===
- Clark Terry (1969, 1970, 1975–1978, 1983, 1988, 1991, 1992, 1999)
- Claude Nobs (1980, 1982, 1983, 1990–1992, 1997, 1999, 2002, 2009, 2011)
- Joe Sample (1982, 1990, 1993, 1997, 2000, 2002, 2003, 2005, 2008, 2011, 2013)
- Klaus Doldinger (1972, 1975–1977, 1980, 1984, 1993, 1998, 2001, 2006, 2010)
- Randy Crawford (1981, 1986, 1990, 1992, 1995, 2003, 2005, 2006, 2008, 2011, 2013)

=== 10 times ===
- Billy Cobham (1974–1978, 1981–1983, 1998, 2010)
- Bobby McFerrin (1982, 1984, 1988, 1992, 1994, 1997, 2001, 2004, 2005, 2012)
- Buddy Guy (1974, 1978, 1983, 1992, 1998, 2002, 2008, 2010, 2012, 2014)
