= Tom Harrison (musician) =

British alto saxophonist and flautist (born 1985)

- Born: 25 July 1985 (age 39); Cardiff, Wales
- Genres: Jazz
- Occupation: Musician
- Instrument(s): Alto saxophone, flute
- Years active: 2009–present
- Labels: Lyte
- Website: www.tomharrisonsax.com

Tom Harrison (born July 25, 1985) is a British alto saxophonist and flautist who has been active on the British jazz scene since 2009.

Harrison reached a national audience following the release of his band Dagda's self-titled debut album in 2012, which was accompanied by a UK tour. The live group featured American tenor saxophonist Jean Toussaint and was well received by the media, described by Time Out magazine as "guitar sax-led melodic modern jazz with a poppy/rocky edge".

Harrison released his second album Unfolding in Tempo in 2016. The album features Robert Mitchell, David Lyttle, Daniel Casimir and Cleveland Watkiss. It was recorded live during a short UK tour earlier that year, which received a large amount of attention from the media, including a feature on BBC News.

Unfolding in Tempo was released on Lyte Records in October 2016. The release was a critical success with praise from the media. BBC Music Magazine said, "Records like this don't come along too often...Leader Tom Harrison's confidently uninhibited wailing on alto reflects his three years engrossed in and performing Ellingtonia. His tender solo take on 'Warm Valley' brings closure to a stormy, no holds barred live set."

Harrison has also worked with Terell Stafford, Peter King, Jason Rebello, and Quentin Collins.
