= Interlude (David Lyttle album) =

Studio album by David Lyttle
- Released: 2 January 2012
- Genre: Hip hop, soul, jazz
- Length: 30:50
- Label: LYTE Records
- Producer: David Lyttle

David Lyttle chronology
Questions (2010)	Interlude (2012)	Faces (2015)

Professional ratings
Review scores
Source	Rating
Hot Press	4/5 stars
MOBO	4/5 stars
RTÉ	4/5 stars

Interlude is the second studio album by Northern Irish musician, songwriter and record producer David Lyttle.

== Track listing ==
All songs produced by David Lyttle.

No.	Title	Writer(s)	Length
1.	"This Moon of Ours" (featuring Homecut)	David Lyttle, Homecut	3:27
2.	"Questions" (featuring Rhea)	David Lyttle	3:37
3.	"Uncertain Steps" (featuring Soweto Kinch & Pino Palladino)	David Lyttle, Soweto Kinch, iLLspokinN, Pino Palladino	2:35
4.	"I Don't Mind" (featuring Rhea)	David Lyttle	4.17
5.	"Angel" (featuring Wile Man)	David Lyttle, Wile Man	3.42
6.	"Interlude" (featuring Homecut & Rhea)	David Lyttle, Homecut	3:59
7.	"The Road" (featuring iLLspokinN)	David Lyttle, iLLspokinN	3:04
8.	"Seek" (featuring Anne Lyttle)	David Lyttle	1:18
9.	"Optimistic" (featuring Homecut & Jason Rebello)	David Lyttle, Homecut	4:55
