= Juno Records =

British online dance music retailer

- Launched: 1996
- Platform: Cross-platform (web-based application)
- Pricing model: Tiered
- Website: www.juno.co.uk

Juno Records is a UK-based online dance music retailer, selling vinyl records, CDs and music accessories, founded by Richard Atherton and Sharon Boyd. The website was created in 1996 as an information-only site called The Dance Music Resource Pages, listing new dance music titles each day as they were released. In 1997 the site changed into an online store Juno Records, allowing users to buy the records and CDs listed. During the e-commerce boom of the late 1990s, the site differentiated itself from other dance music stores by maintaining a text-based presentation.

In December 2004, version 2 of Juno Records’ web site was launched, adding graphics, and more flexible navigation to the original site design.

In February 2006, Juno Records added MP3 and WAV downloads to its catalogue, and in July 2006 launched Juno Download as a standalone site. Juno Download was later sold, and Juno Records returned to being a vinyl & CD retail web site. In the same year, the web site also won Best Entertainment site in the Website Of The Year awards. In September 2006, a Spanish-language version of the web site was added.

In 2007 a series of 10 releases were commissioned to mark Juno Records' 10th anniversary, each featuring a well-known dance track remixed by new producers, including remixes of Faze Action by Carl Craig and Cybotron’s "Clear" by Troy Pierce and Cobblestone Jazz.

In June 2007 Juno Records won DJ Magazine’s "Best Of British" award for Best British Record Store. In August 2007, a German version of Juno Records’ website was launched.

In 2008, Juno Records launched a distribution division Juno Distribution, manufacturing and distributing vinyl records for dance music labels including Sushitech, Mosaic, Trelik, and 20:20 Vision.

In 2023, Juno launched a wholesale division, Juno Wholesale, selling vinyl records and CDs.

On June 1st 2026, Juno Download has shut down. No specific reasons have been cited. Account access for download and a support email remain available.

== Current sites ==
- Juno Records – the main international online shop for both physical and digital products, with language support in English, Spanish, German, Mandarin, and Japanese

== See also ==
- Beatport
- Bleep (store)
- Electronic dance music
