= Faces (David Lyttle album) =

Album by David Lyttle

Studio album by David Lyttle
- Released: 16 March 2015
- Genres: Hip hop, soul, jazz pop
- Length: 33:21
- Label: Lyte Records
- Producer: David Lyttle

David Lyttle chronology
Interlude	Faces

Professional ratings
Review scores
Source	Rating
All About Jazz	4/5 stars
Hot Press	4/5 stars
Rolling Stone	positive

Faces is the third studio album by Northern Irish musician, songwriter and record producer David Lyttle. It features collaborations with Talib Kweli, Duke Special and Joe Lovano.

== Track listing ==
All songs produced by David Lyttle.

No.	Title	Writer(s)	Length
1.	"Intro"	David Lyttle	0:33
2.	"The Second Line" (featuring Talib Kweli)	David Lyttle, Talib Kweli	2:49
3.	"Houdini" (featuring Duke Special)	David Lyttle, Duke Special	3:41
4.	"Seek" (featuring Anne Lyttle)	David Lyttle	4:32
5.	"Detour" (featuring Rhea Lyttle & Jean Toussaint)	David Lyttle	4:37
6.	"Faces" (featuring Cleveland Watkiss)	David Lyttle, Cleveland Watkiss	3:08
7.	"Lullaby for the Lost" (featuring Joe Lovano, iLLspokinn & Homecut)	David Lyttle, Joe Lovano, iLLspokinN, Homecut	3:36
8.	"Game Boy" (featuring Rhea Lyttle & Zane)	David Lyttle, Zane	3:24
9.	"To Be Free" (featuring Homecut & Natalie Oliveri)	David Lyttle, Homecut, Natalie Oliveri	3:03
10.	"Perception" (featuring Anne Lyttle & Meilana Gilard)	David Lyttle, Anne Lyttle	4:11
