= David Lyttle =

Irish jazz drummer, hip-hop producer and composer

- Born: 21 June 1984 (age 42); Waringstown, Northern Ireland
- Genres: Jazz, hip hop, soul
- Occupations: Musician, producer, composer, label owner
- Instruments: Drums, bass, keyboards
- Label: Lyte Records
- Website: www.davidlyttle.com

David Lyttle (born 21 June 1984) is a jazz drummer, hip hop producer, composer and record label owner from Waringstown, Northern Ireland. He has released five solo albums and eight EPs, and received nominations in the MOBO Awards and Urban Music Awards.

== Performing career ==
Lyttle began performing under the direction of his parents with the Lyttle Family and in his teens was active as a drummer, DJ and studied classical cello. He began his jazz career in the band of Louis Stewart in 2007 and released his debut album True Story the same year. He has featured notable jazz artists in his groups, including Kurt Rosenwinkel, Seamus Blake, Terell Stafford, Greg Osby, Jean Toussaint and Tim Warfield, and appeared in the groups of Jesse van Ruller, David Kikoski and Soweto Kinch.

Lyttle was nominated in the 2015 MOBO Awards for Best Jazz Act. He is the first Irish musician to have been nominated for a MOBO. He was also nominated for an Urban Music Award in October 2015.

In April 2017 he carried out a 5000-mile, coast-to-coast residency in the U.S., performing for unusual audiences in an attempt to understand more about the public's connection with jazz. The tour included performances at the Bagdad Café on Route 66 in the Mojave Desert, the Little A'Le'Inn' in Rachel, Nevada near Area 51 and at the site of jazz drummer Art Blakey's childhood home in the Hill District, Pittsburgh. Lyttle received the Arts Council of Northern Ireland's Major Individual Award, worth £15,000, for the project and vlogged for the MOBO Awards YouTube channel.

In October 2018 Lyttle collected tape recordings of New York City residents speaking about change in the city, creating "Tapes & Drums, New York", a solo show which features his improvised drumming.

Lyttle's 2022 tour included dates in Morocco, Egypt, Turkey, Tunisia, Canada and throughout Europe.

In June 2023 he performed for Irish President Michael D. Higgins at Aras an Uachtaráin.

== Studio projects & recordings ==
Lyttle has released three acoustic jazz albums, two crossover albums and five hip-hop EPs. His studio projects and output as a producer are usually centred around hip-hop, using live drums or the Akai MPC 2000XL, and often feature the Rhodes piano.

Lyttle's second studio album Interlude was released on 2 January 2012. Its guests include Soweto Kinch, Pino Palladino, Jason Rebello and members of his family. It received its first radio airing on BBC Introducing on BBC Radio 1, and received positive reviews in Ireland and Britain. MOBO described it as "an exceptional album" and Hot Press said it was "a rare sort of treat to come out of Ireland".

Lyttle's third studio album Faces was released on 16 March 2015 and featured collaborations with Talib Kweli, Duke Special and Joe Lovano. It was well received by critics with Dave DiMartino of Rolling Stone calling it "one of the best, robust listening experiences you’re likely to have all year" and Colm O'Hare of Hot Press describing it as "one of the most inventive Irish releases of the year." Other media champions included Lauren Laverne on BBC 6 Music and Jazz FM.

On 20 November 2015 Lyttle released Say & Do, a collaborative album with Northern Irish singer/songwriter VerseChorusVerse. It reached No. 1 in the Amazon UK blues chart.

In August 2020 Lyttle collaborated with Liam Neeson, reimagining Van Morrison's "On Hyndford Street" for Hot Press magazine's YouTube celebration of Morrison at 75. Lyttle plays Rhodes piano, cello, organ and bass guitar on the recording which he also produced.

Lyttle's third jazz album IN2 was released on cassette in July 2022 and digitally in March 2023. Recorded exclusively as a duo with guitarist Phil Robson, it was described as "quietly groundbreaking" by All About Jazz. In December 2022 he released Christmas At Home, a hip-hop beat tape EP which samples obscure Christmas albums. He has since released a further eight hip-hop EPs, including four volumes of his Trailer Sound series. In August 2023 he released ‘I Thought You Knew’ with Detroit rapper and J Dilla associate Frank Nitt.

== Artist residencies ==
In 2015 Lyttle was Derry's Musician In Residence as part of the city's legacy program following its designation as UK City of Culture. From January to March 2016 he was Musician In Residence at the Metropolitan Arts Centre, Belfast, where he mentored up-and-coming jazz musicians from Northern Ireland.

In September and October 2017, Lyttle was the British Council and PRS for Music's Musician In Residence in Suzhou, China. He collaborated with traditional Chinese musicians and released a weekly podcast called Tapes From China.

== Outreach and charity ==
Lyttle is the artistic director of Jazzlife Alliance, a non-profit jazz talent development organisation whose principle funder is the Arts Council of Northern Ireland. He is the founder of its youth programme, Jazz Juniors, which is based at the Metropolitan Arts Centre, Belfast.

Since 2018 he has been the Northern Irish ambassador for UK charity Live Music Now.

== Lyte Records ==
As owner and founder of Lyte Records, Lyttle has released albums by notable jazz, blues and roots artists, including Ari Hoenig, Jason Rebello, Nigel Mooney and Jean Toussaint. He has also produced debut albums for young talents such as Israeli classical pianist Ariel Lanyi and Slovak jazz guitarist Andreas Varady, who was managed by Quincy Jones and was discovered by Lyttle in 2010.

== Solo Discography ==
- True Story (2007)
- Interlude (2012)
- Faces (2015)
- IN2 (David Lyttle & Phil Robson) (2022)
- Christmas At Home (2022)
- Trailer Sound, Vol. 1 (2023)
- Trailer Sound, Vol. 2 (2023)
- Trailer Sound, Vol. 3 (2023)
- Bandit (2023)
- Zero (2023)
- Return of the Bandit (2023)
- Trailer Sound, Vol. 4 (2023)
- Frontier Soul (2023)
