= Tia Brazda =

- Born: Vancouver, British Columbia, Canada
- Genres: Jazz; Pop; Vocal jazz; Swing jazz; Swing music; Electro swing; Jazz pop
- Occupations: Vocalist, songwriter, lyricist, performer
- Instrument: Vocals
- Website: www.tiabrazda.com

Tia Brazda is a Canadian singer and songwriter, known for performing jazz music that incorporates elements of swing, blues, rockabilly, soul, electro and pop. She has been recognized as a notable figure in the electro-swing movement, and has performed at prominent international jazz festivals such as the Montreux Jazz Festival and the Festival International de Jazz de Montreal. Her 2015 album Bandshell was named one of the best of the decade in the Italian press.

== Career ==
Born in Vancouver, British Columbia, Brazda did her first on-stage performance in church at age 5. A music teacher in New Westminster got Brazda interested in the classic jazz singers such as Ella Fitzgerald and Sarah Vaughan. Brazda performed in cover bands before writing her own material and honing her sound in the clubs of Toronto. During the recording of her debut EP Cabin Fever, she met Holly Cole's bassist, Marc Rogers, who set her up for recording sessions with some of Toronto's top jazz musicians. The EP debuted in 2012 at No. 1 on the iTunes jazz chart in Canada, and led to Brazda touring Europe with club dates in Paris and Amsterdam, as well as performances at the Maui Waui Festival and Bestival in the UK.

In 2015 Brazda released her debut full-length album Bandshell, which also debuted at No. 1 on the iTunes jazz chart in Canada. The lead single "Shine" was described "as good as it gets" in the swing jazz genre, and received airplay in Canada, the U.S. and on Rai Radio 1 in Italy, where she eventually played several live dates. The album was rated the No. 5 best Canadian jazz release of 2015 by Jazz FM 91.

In 2016 Brazda headlined the main stage at the Festival International de Jazz de Montreal, played two highly reviewed shows at the Xerox Rochester International Jazz Festival, as well as the Iboga Summer Festival in Spain. She also released Bandshell Remixed, an album of remixes of songs off her Bandshell album, by prominent DJs from around the world including Wolfgang Löhr and Sound Nomaden.

In 2017, Brazda performed at the Montreux Jazz Festival, and San Jose Jazz Summer Fest where she was described as "Best of the Fest" by local news.

In 2018, Brazda released 'Daydream', which features Larnell Lewis of Snarky Puppy on drums, Shirantha Beddage on saxophone, William Sperandei on trumpet, Adrean Farrugia on piano, William Carn on trombone and Marc Rogers on bass. The album explores new styles for Brazda such as bossa nova, soul and tango. It also includes a co-write and piano performance by Mark "Pelli" Pellizzer of the band MAGIC!.

In 2022, Brazda released When I Get Low, a collection of mostly jazz standards from the Great American Songbook. It was recorded remotely by the respective players due to the Covid-19 pandemic, for which The Syncopated Times said "While many bands made admirable efforts at remote recording with credible results, this team has absolutely cracked the technique to produce a superb sounding record." The WholeNote magazine also commented that Brazda "has a fully formed style that is wholly her own."

== Style and influences ==
Brazda's music has been described as a "walking musical catalog of 20th century jazz styles", a "hip pastiche", and "a difference in an already established genre." Brazda's voice has been described as "sultry" and "uniquely smoky", and has been compared to Billie Holiday and Amy Winehouse, having performed early on at a benefit in the late singer's honour. Brazda is known for writing her own original material, as well as using real instruments instead of samples.

Brazda lists among her influences Ella Fitzgerald, Peggy Lee and gospel hymns. Aside from jazz, Brazda grew up listening to swing revival, neo-soul, trip-hop and grunge. Her album 'Bandshell' has been likened to the music of Big Bad Voodoo Daddy, Black Cat Zoot, Tape Five, Royal Crown Revue and Cherry Poppin’ Daddies. On tour, Brazda's band has included saxophonists from both Royal Crown Revue and Cherry Poppin’ Daddies.

== Awards and acclaim ==
Brazda's first three albums, Cabin Fever (2012) and albums Bandshell (2015) and Daydream (2018) all debuted at No. 1 on the iTunes Jazz Chart in Canada. Bandshell reached No. 24 on the CMJ national radio chart in the US and was rated the No. 5 best Canadian jazz release by Jazz FM 91 in Toronto. Her song "Hard Luck (DJ Margiotta Remix)" from the album Bandshell Remixed made the Best of 2016 list on The Craig Charles Funk and Soul Show on BBC Radio 6 in the UK. In 2016 Brazda was awarded the Stingray Rising Star Music Award. Francesco Adinolfi of Rai Radio 1 in Italy, named her 2015 album Bandshell one of the best of the decade.

== Discography ==
=== Albums ===
- Cabin Fever (Rebeluck, 2012)
- Bandshell (Flatcar, 2015)
- Bandshell Remixed (Flatcar, 2016)
- Daydream (Flatcar, 2018)
- When I Get Low (Flatcar, 2022)

=== Singles ===
- Cabin Fever (Deluxe Version) (Pashmount Music, 2013)
- Wild Jack (Saampler Remix) (Pashmount Music, 2013)
- Cabin Fever (Lockdown Remix) (Flatcar Records, 2023)
