= Andreas Varady =

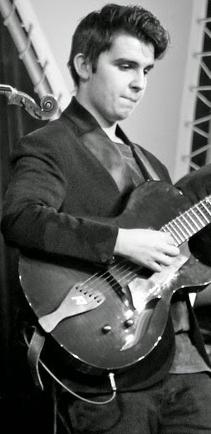
- Andreas Varady playing guitar at Jazz festival St ingbert in 2015

Background information
- Born: 24 July 1997 (age 28); Rimavská Sobota, Slovakia
- Genres: Jazz, gypsy jazz
- Occupation: Musician
- Instrument: Guitar
- Years active: 2010–present
- Labels: Lyte, Verve Resonance
- Website: andreasvarady.com

Andreas Varady (born 24 July 1997) is a Slovak Hungarian jazz guitarist managed by Quincy Jones. Regarded as a child prodigy, he has been influenced by guitarists Django Reinhardt, Wes Montgomery, and George Benson and has been performing internationally since the age of thirteen.

== Biography ==
Andreas Varady was born in Slovakia into a Hungarian Romani family. He began learning guitar at the age of four under the direction of his father, Bandi. In 2007, his family moved to Limerick, Ireland and after two years of busking in Limerick and Cork, he met Irish drummer and producer David Lyttle after writing to him on YouTube.

Lyttle began featuring him in his band and in 2010 produced Varady's debut album Questions for Lyte Records. The release of Questions and Varady's growing presence on YouTube brought him to the attention of Martin Taylor, Louis Stewart, Tommy Emmanuel, and later Quincy Jones.

In 2011, when he was 13, he performed at Ronnie Scott's Jazz Club in London and is the club's youngest headliner.

Varady appeared on the front cover of Guitar Player magazine and at festivals in France, the UK and the South Pacific. In 2012 Varady was invited by Claude Nobs to perform at Montreux Jazz Festival as part of Quincy Jones's Global Gumbo, which Jones presented. Varady performed with the same group in New York and Los Angeles later in 2012, and signed to Jones's management company in January 2013.

Varady signed a deal with Verve Records in October 2013 and recorded his first album for the label in January 2014. The first album, Andreas Varady, was produced by David Paich, Jay Oliver, and Quincy Jones and was released on 5 August 2014.

== Discography ==
- Andreas Varady (Verve, 2014)
- The Quest (Resonance, 2018)
- Sunrise (Quinton, 2024)
