= Nigel Mooney =

- Born: 12 August 1963 (age 61); Dublin, Ireland
- Genres: Blues, jazz
- Occupation(s): Musician, singer
- Instrument(s): Guitar, vocals
- Labels: Lyte
- Website: nigelmooney.com

Nigel Mooney (born 12 August 1963) is a blues and jazz singer, guitarist, and songwriter from Ireland. He came to prominence on the Irish blues scene in the 1980s with his Gripewater Blues Band, which opened for B.B. King and backed Dr John in Dublin. In the 1990s Mooney and his band switched to an acoustic jazz sound. His debut album All My Love's in Vain was Ireland's top selling jazz album in 2005. In 2013 he released The Bohemian Mooney, featuring Georgie Fame and many leading Irish jazz musicians. It was named RTÉ Radio 1's album of the week in April 2013 and Mooney appeared on RTÉ's The Late Late Show the following month. The Bohemian Mooney was voted Irish Times jazz album of the year in December 2013.

== Discography ==
- All My Love's in Vain (2005)
- The Bohemian Mooney (2013)
