= Yoav Eshed =

Yoav Eshed יואב אשד
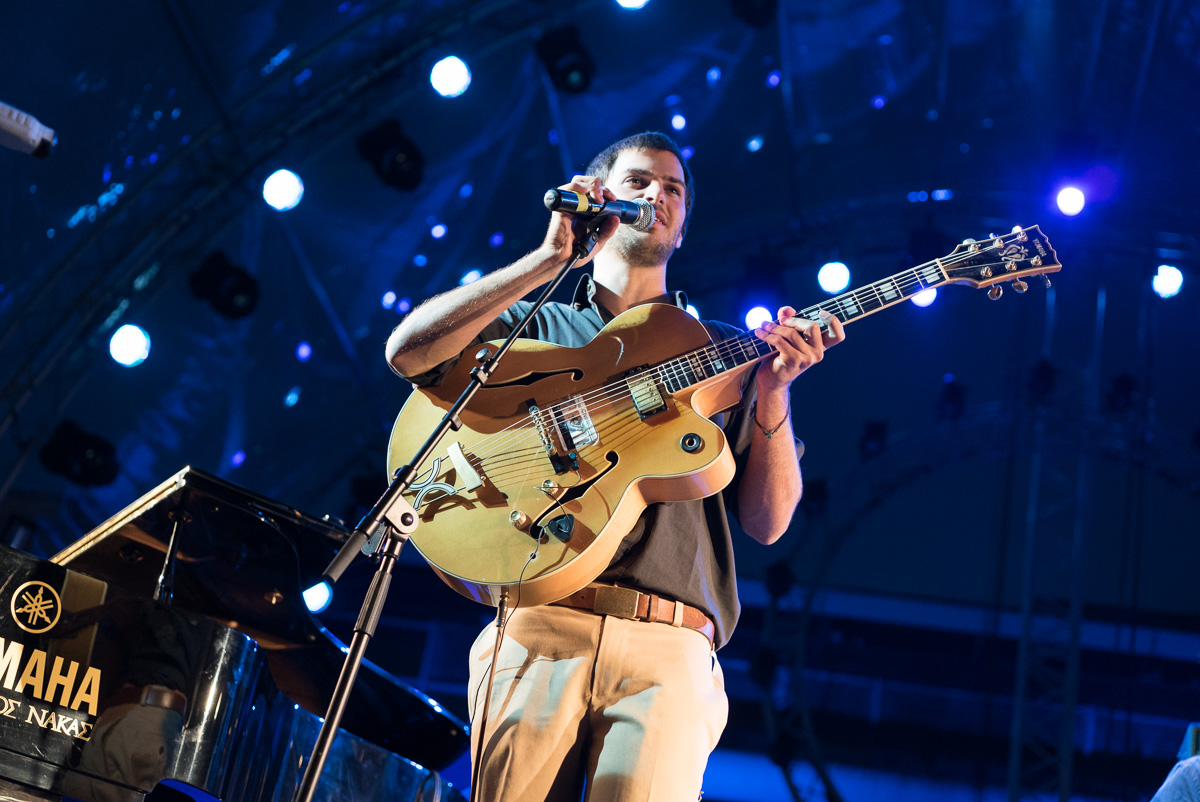
- Athens Jazz Festival

Background information
- Born: April 28, 1989 (age 37); Ramat Hasharon, Israel
- Genre: Jazz
- Occupations: Musician, Guitarist, Composer
- Instrument: Guitar
- Years active: 2008–present
- Website: https://www.yoaveshed.com

Yoav Eshed (Hebrew: יואב אשד; born April 28, 1989) is a jazz guitarist and composer based in Brooklyn, New York.

== Biography ==
=== Early life ===
He was born in Ramat Hasharon, Israel, to a family of musicians. Yoav started to play the piano at the age of 3 and played classical music. He picked up the guitar at the age of 13.

Yoav studied jazz with Amit Golan and guitar with Shai Chen. He attended Rimon School of Jazz and Contemporary Music and won 1st place in the school's annual jazz competition. He then received a presidential scholarship for his undergraduate studies at Berklee. In addition, Yoav won the America-Israel Cultural Foundation jazz study scholarships between 2008–2014.

=== Career in Israel ===
In 2012, Trio Millionaires, led by Yoav Eshed, received the support of the Ministry of Culture for their musical arrangement of the Israeli children's songbook, The Sixteenth Sheep, collaborating with singer and comedian Tomer Sharon. The trio recorded and released their debut album digitally on Bandcamp.

=== Career in the United States ===
Yoav is based in New York City, leading his quartet, Guitar Hearts.

== Awards and honors ==
- 1st place prize at Rimon Jazz Annual Competition
- 1st place Winner of 'Made in New York’ Jazz Competition Solo Section
- 1st place winner of Lee Ritenour 'Six String Theory' Jazz section International Guitar Competition

== Discography ==
As a band leader:

- Introducing Trio Millionaires (2013)
- Two Words (2018)
- August (2020)
- A Way Out (2021) released on Sounderscore record label
- Guitar Hearts (2025)

As sideman:

- Clemens Grassman - Midnight Apple (2018)
- Fima Chupakin - Water (2019)
- Aaron Bahr Septet - Places (Real and Imagined) (2020)
- Steven Terry - Compositions (2020)
- Ari Hoenig - Golden Treasures (2022)
- David Sirkis - When It All Starts (2023)
- Lau Noah - A Dos (2024)
