= Paula Grande =

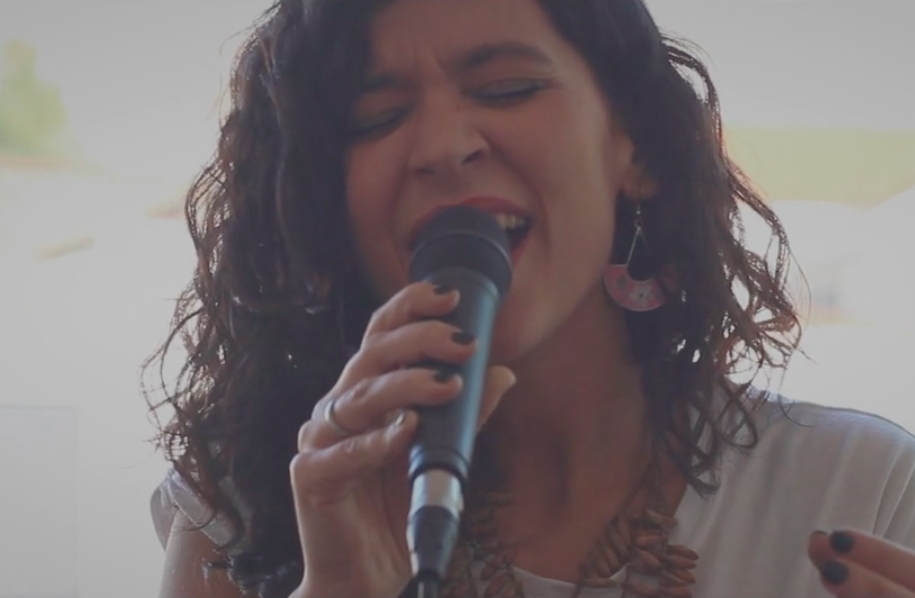
- Paula Grande in 2016
- Born: 1986 (age 39–40)
- Era: Contemporary

Paula Grande (born 1986) is a Catalan-Spanish composer and singer. She debuted in 2016 with the music album Viatge interestel·lar. She is known to perform jazz fusion with flamenco and hip-hop influences.

== Biography ==
Paula Grande was born into a Spanish speaking family in Girona; her father came from the Canary Islands and her mother from Extremadura. She grew up in Costa Brava, between Empordà and Maresme, but has also resided in Venezuela.

In the early 2010s, Grande decided to step up her interest in music. She took part in jazz festivals in Montreux and Lithuania between 2013 and 2014. Between 2014 and 2015, she studied jazz in France.

After that, in 2016, she completed her work for her first music album Viatge interestel·lar. The ten songs on the album are a mixture of Catalan, English and Spanish, having both jazz and flamenco influences.

During 2017, she toured in Colombia and Cuba with her music. In 2018, she released her second music album called Sóc, in this album she featured more hip-hop.

== Discography ==
- 2016 – Viatge interestel·lar, Little Red Corvette Records, LRC035
- 2018 – Sóc, U98 Music
