= Serpentyne =

Serpentyne is a fictional character appearing in American comic books published by Marvel Comics. The character first appeared in Rom #8 (July 1980).

== Fictional character biography ==
Serpentyne is from a race of lizards from New Mexico mutated into humanoids, and he tried to take Rom's weapon to fight the Dire Wraiths.
