= Odezenne =

French band

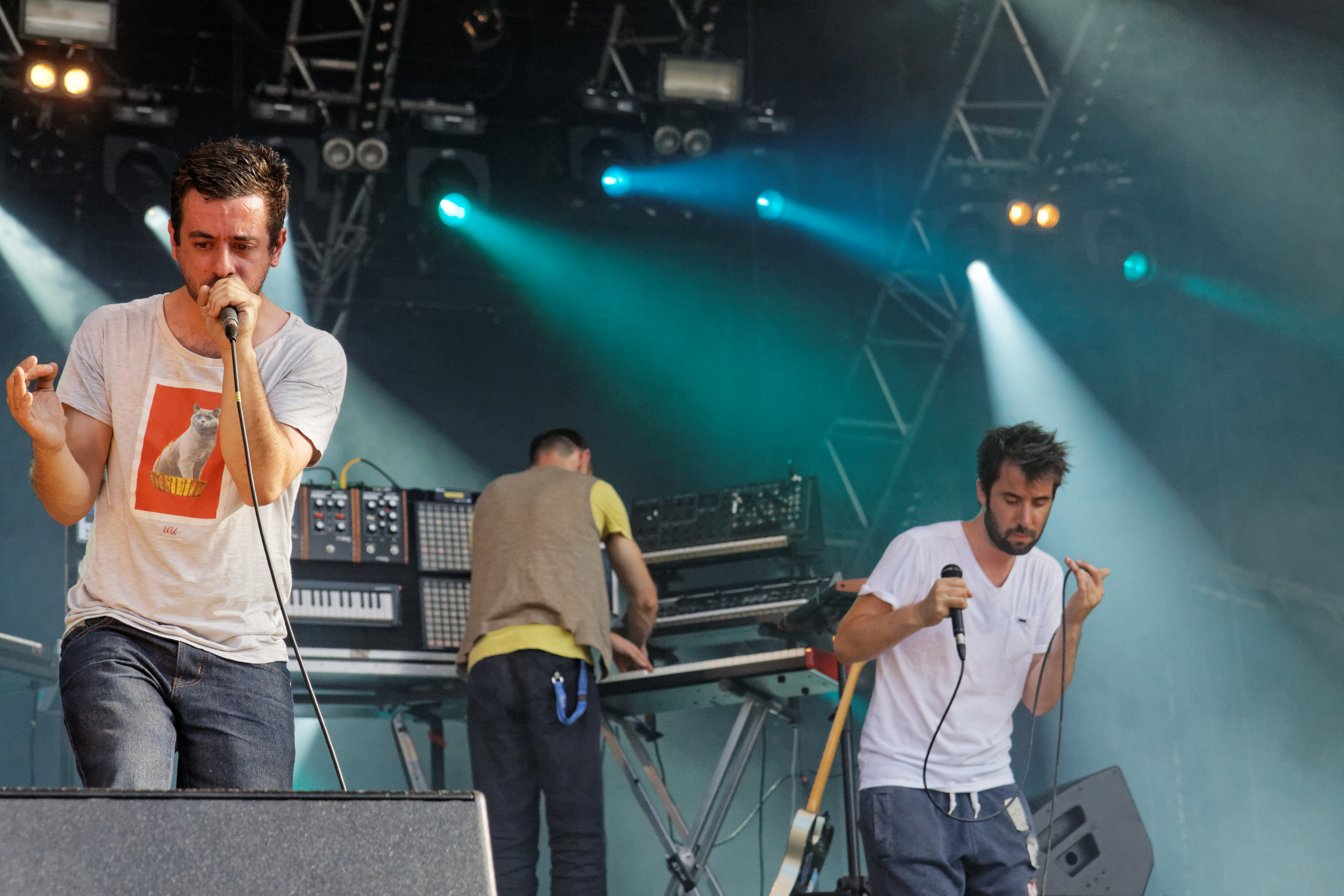
- Odezenne in 2014

Background information
- Origin: Bordeaux, Aquitaine, France
- Years active: 2005–present
- Label: Universeul
- Members: Alix Caillet; Jacques Cormary; Mattia Lucchini
- Past members: Pierre (DJ Lodjeez); Marie-Priska Caillet
- Website: odezenne.com

Odezenne (French pronunciation: [odəzɛn]) is a French band from Bordeaux. Their sound has been characterised as being notably eclectic. The band consists of Alix, Jacques, and Mattia who were childhood friends. The group has released six studio albums, two EP, and multiple music videos.

== Biography ==
=== Beginnings (2005–2010) ===
Alix and Mattia met in middle school. The former is from Île-de-France, and the latter is from Milan. The inspiration for the group's name comes from this period. "Odezenne was the name of our old principal. We used it in a freestyle and it made us laugh, so we kept it," explains Alix. In 2005, the group was initially called O2zen (which has a phonetic similarity in French to Odezenne). The two friends later met Jacques, from Choisy-le-Roi, who at the time went by Jaco H17.

The group started recording their first songs between 2005 and 2007. A friend offered them their first gig at Inca, an underground bar known throughout the city of Bordeaux as being the place where many local groups first played. Odezenne filled the room and returned to the bar three more times in April 2007. They decided to record an album, put on concerts, and start their label, Universeul, since they wanted to be independent. Released in November 2008, their first studio album, titled Sans chantilly, was well received by critics.

=== O.V.N.I. (2011–2013) ===
In March 2011, after eleven months in the studio, the group released their second album, a concept album by the name of O.V.N.I. _Orchestre Virtuose National et Incompétent, the acronym of which also doubles as the acronym for UFO in French. This time, the album was sold in some stores. With their growing popularity, Odezenne released a deluxe version of the album in 2012 with five new songs, calling it "L'édition Louis XIV" (the Louis XIV Edition).

Since the end of 2011, the group has released a series of music videos, exclusively produced by Universeul, which have strongly helped launch the group. The first was for the song "Gomez" and was directed by Selim Bentounes, followed by "Taxi," directed by Adrien Benoliel. It was the video for "Tu pu du cu" that was the group's first big hit on the web. The young director Romain Winkler became more and more active with the group and directed the videos for "Saxophone," "Chewing-gum," "Rien" (Nothing), "Je veux te baiser" (I Want to Fuck You), and "Vilaine."

In late 2012 the group was named on the FAIR 2013, a list of musicians chosen by a French music publication, which helped solidify Odezenne's presence in the French music scene. Their reputation afforded them a spot in many of the largest music festival in the summer of 2014, notably Les Vieilles Charrues, the Eurockéennes of Belfort, the Paléo Festival in Switzerland, the Solidays, Francofolies of La Rochelle, and Fusion Festival in Germany. In October 2013, the group released a live EP recorded at Vivres de l'art in Bordeaux to celebrate their hundredth concert.

=== Rien (2014) ===
On 21 April 2014, the group released "Rien" (Nothing), which was later released as a part of an EP of the same name in May 2014. The EP was mainly known thanks to the music video for "Je veux te baiser" (I want to fuck you). The video was an instant hit due to the subject matter and quickly went viral on social media.

=== Dolziger Str. 2 (2015–present) ===
Following a winter trip in Berlin that lasted several months, Odezenne released Dolziger Str. 2 on 13 November 2015. The first single, "Bouche à lèvres," was released as a music video which was widely spread on social networks despite its –18 warning. A total of six videos were made for the album. The album received wide success notably due to its rich sound, propped by texts of rare depth, that blur the border between chanson and rap. A particular craze surrounded the release of the album, even making the cover of Les Inrockuptibles and the band's selection as best new artist by Apple Music.
The album is followed by a tour of over 100 shows including most notably a series of seven concerts at SXSW in Austin.

== Role of the Internet ==
Odezenne is a group whose career is intimately linked to the DIY ethic and to the power of the Internet. Starting in 2008, barely twelve days after its release, the album artwork for Sans chantilly was displayed prominently on the home page of the music platform Deezer and the 1,000 copies quickly sold without being available in stores. Odezenne achieved this feat while opting neither to sign with a label nor try to get their songs on the radio, relying instead on word of mouth on social networks.

== Discography ==
Studio albums

- sans. chantilly (2008)
- O.V.N.I (2011)
  - OVNI - Édition Louis XIV (same album with five new original songs, 2012)
- Dolziger Str.2 (2015)
- Au Baccara (2018)
- 1200 mètres en tout (2022)
- Unplugged (2023)
- DOULA (des couloirs des portières) (2025)
- DOULA (hypercouleurs) (2025)

Live albums

- Live aux vivres de l'art (2013)
- Rien - Live (2014)

EPs

- Rien (2014)
- Pouchkine (2019)
