= Prince Malachi =

Prince Malachi (born Mark Wynter, 1969, London, England) is an English roots reggae singer.

== Biography ==
Wynter was born in south London, and is the son of jazz guitarist Winston Wynter.

He adopted the stagename Federal and worked as a deejay, performing on UK Sound systems such as Gemini, Fatman, Sir Coxsone, and Java during the 1980s. He became a Rastafari and changed his name to Prince Malachi. In 1997, he formed the Mount Ararat label with Bruno Wiener. In 1998, he released his first album, Jah Light, which garnered some international attention, under RAS Records. He then teamed up with Xterminator producer Philip "Fatis" Burrell on the "Love Jah" single and the album that followed in 1998. The following year, he released Watch Over We on RAS Records.

He recorded his next album, Runaway Slave, but his career was interrupted when he received a three-and-a-half-year prison sentence, of which he served 18 months, for what he described as "just a likkle thing that happened with me and babylon".

== Discography ==
=== Singles ===
- "Dancing School" (Stingray)
- "Runaway Slave" (1998, Stingray)
- "This Feeling" (Stingray)
- "Greater Things in Life" (Stingray)
- "Our Country" (Xterminator)
- "Love Jah" (1998, Xterminator)
- "Watch Over We" (Xterminator)
- "You Can't Come In" (Xterminator)
- "Life Circle" (Jet Star/Xterminator)
- "Ready Fi Dem" (1998, Xterminator)
- "Fire It Is Blazing" (1998, Xterminator)
- "I've Searched" (VP/Xterminator)
- "Why Is It So" (2000, Harmony House)
- "Jah Love" (2003, Backyard Movements)
- "Can't Control I" (2003, Falasha)
- "I Know" (2004, Notorious)
- "Behold" (2004, Falasha)
- "1966" (2004, Blakamix)
- "Onward We Go" (2004, Stingray)
- "Time To Move On" (2004, Cousins)
- "Gideon Trod" (2006, Hi Tek)
- "Which Way" (2006, Vibes House)
- "Jah Guide Dem" (2006, Reggae Fever)
- "Jah Nah Sleep" (2006, Maximum Sound)
- "Heavy Load" (2007, Stingray)
- "Judgment Hour" (2007, Stingray)
- "Me & Them" (versatile riddim) (2008, Wake Up)

=== Albums ===
- Jah Light (1998, Mount Ararat/RAS/Heartbeat)
- Love Jah (1999, VP) also issued as Prophet, Priest & King (1999, Xterminator)
- Watch Over We (1999, RAS)
- Runaway Slave (2004, Charm/Stingray)
- One Perfect Love (2007, Blakamix)
