= Mighty Oaks (band) =

Berlin-based indie-folkpop band

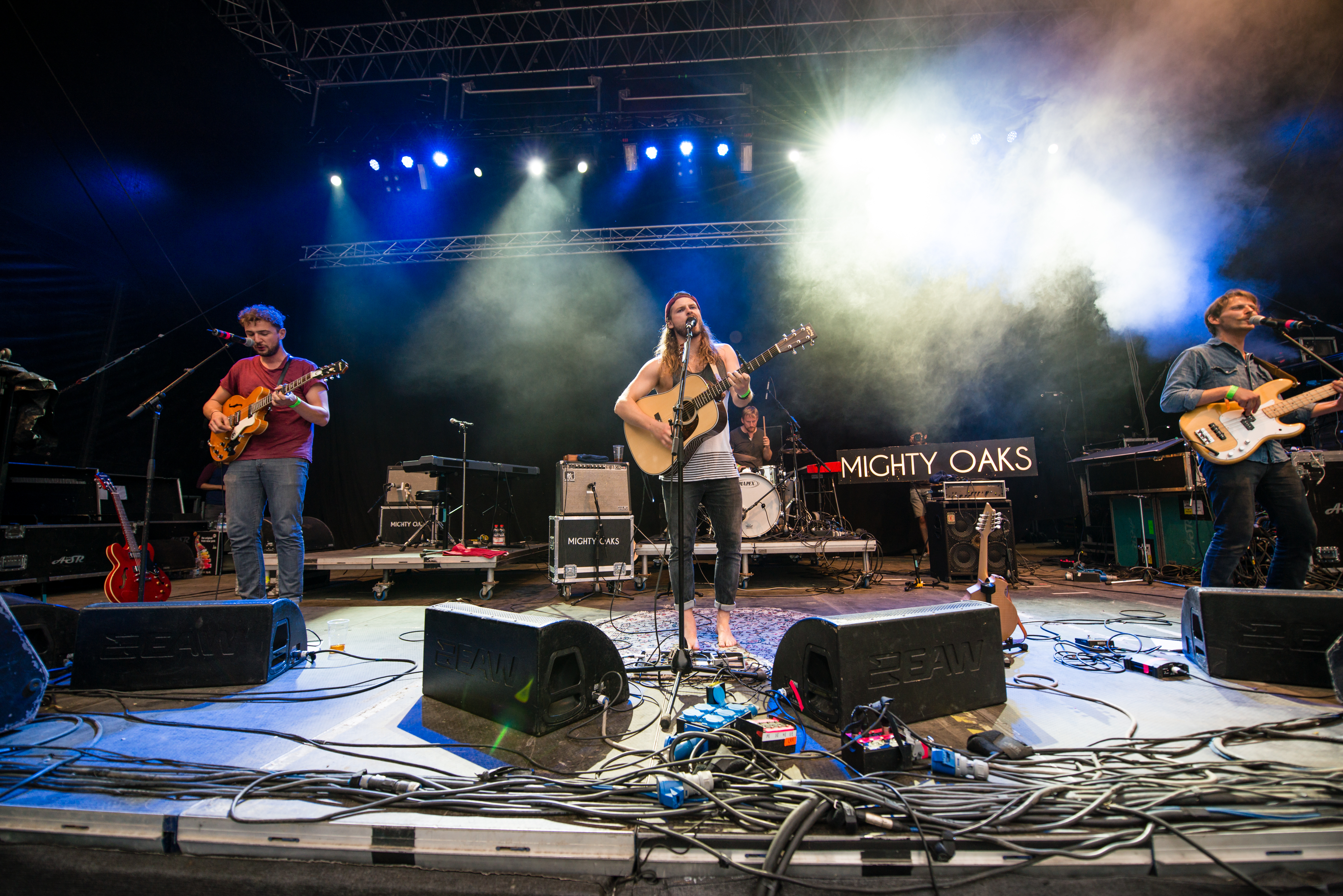

Background information
- Origin: Berlin, Germany
- Genres: Indie folk, folk rock
- Years active: 2010-present
- Labels: Astralwerks, Vertigo, Capitol, UMG, BMG, Sony Music
- Members: Ian Hooper; Claudio Donzelli; Craig Saunders
- Website: www.mightyoaksmusic.com

Mighty Oaks are an indie/folk rock trio made up of Ian Hooper (US), Claudio Donzelli (Italy) and Craig Saunders (UK). They formed in 2010 and are based in Berlin. According to Allmusic, the group releases "tight, three-part harmonies and effusive, largely acoustic-driven folk anthems." In early 2014 they released their first LP, Howl, on Universal Records. The album peaked at No. 10 on the Official German charts with several singles charting as well. They have since released a second LP, Dreamers (2017), and an EP, Storm (2017). On the 7th of February 2020, they released their third full-length album, All Things Go.

== History ==
=== 2010–12: Founding, first EPs ===
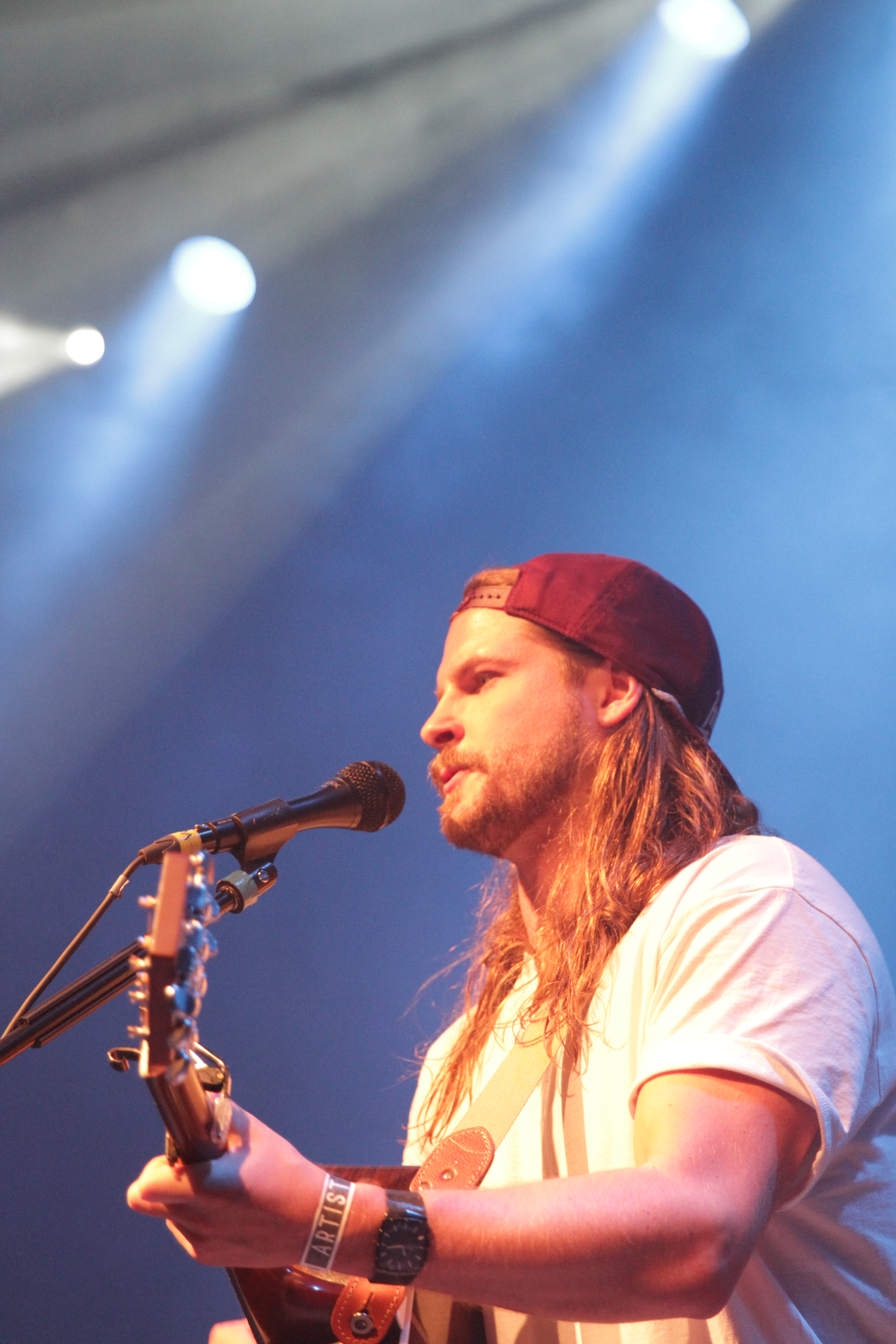
Vocalist and guitarist Ian Hooper

Mighty Oaks was formed in early 2010 by instrumentalists and vocalists Ian Hooper (United States), Claudio Donzelli (Italy), and Craig Saunders (United Kingdom). Hooper had moved to Hamburg after college some time before, and had befriended bassist Saunders when both were working on solo material as singer-songwriters. Several months later they met Donzelli at a small acoustic festival, and kept in touch afterwards. All three members had an interest in indie rock and folk rock, and together began focusing on guitar and instruments such as mandolin. The group self-released an EP on March 21, 2011, recording it themselves in Donzelli's apartment. Though never officially released on a label, the EP garnered several hundred thousand hits on SoundCloud.

=== 2012–14: Studio releases ===
The group began focusing fully on their music in the middle of 2012, beginning to record in a studio. In the summer of 2012 they self-released their first studio EP, Just One Day, distributed through Rough Trade Records. In support of the EP they toured with Shout Out Louds in Europe, opened the Waldbühne in Berlin for Kings of Leon, and joined bands such as Chvrches on the 'Introducing!' tour of Germany put on by Intro Magazine. The band later played a sold-out tour of Switzerland, Austria, and Germany in the fall of 2013.

=== 2014–2019: Howl and Dreamers ===
External videos
- Mighty Oaks "7 Days" /// Berlin Sessions #64 (Aug 2013)
- Mighty Oaks "Brother" Official Music Video (Jan 2014)
- Mighty Oaks "Be With You Always" Official Music Video (Jan 2017)

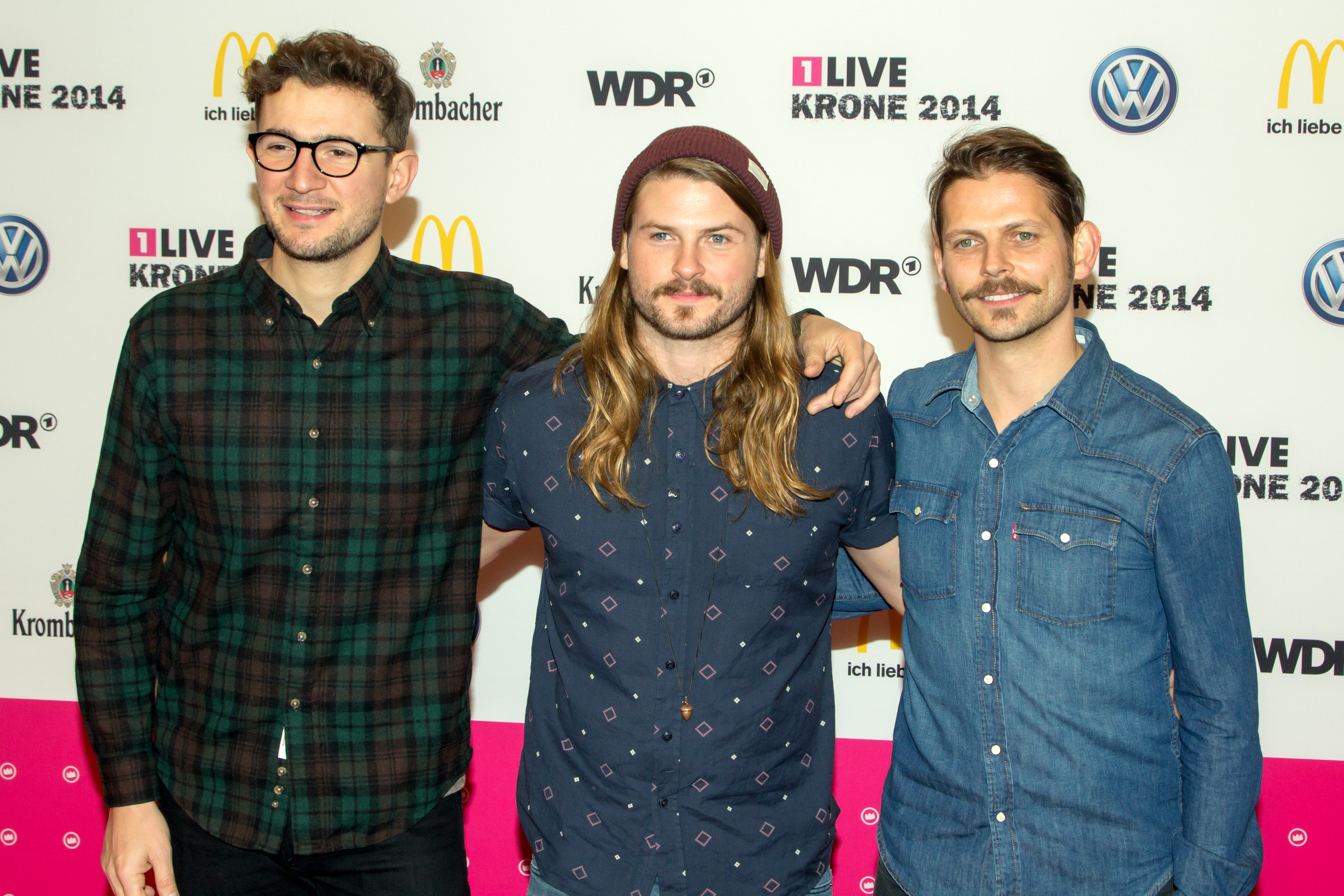
The band at 1Live Krone 2014: L to R, Claudio Donzelli, Ian Hooper, and Craig Saunders

In early 2014 they released their first LP, Howl, on Universal Records in Europe. The album peaked at No. 10 on the German chart, with several singles charting as well. It reached the top 10 on the charts in Switzerland, also charting in several other European countries. In early 2014 the band released the single "Brother," releasing a music video which was filmed in Washington state. The band stated that "‘Brother’ is based on Ian’s relationship with his best friend in the States, and their adventures and maturation in the...Pacific Northwest of America." They released the EP Brother in the United States in October 2014. About the EP, the band explained that "each song represents a different excerpt from a point in Ian’s life and, in such, we treated each track as a different scene in a movie, or chapter in a novel, hoping that each one would carry its own meaning and be surrounded by its own world and emotion."

Major festival performances from 2014 included events such as the Melt! Festival and Dockville in Germany, the Montreux Jazz Festival in Switzerland, Latitude Festival in the UK, Slotsfjell in Norway, Way Out West in Sweden, Exit Festival in Serbia, and Valkhof (NL). As of December 2014 the group was touring Europe on The Golden Road Tour. Their debut album was released in the United States in the spring of 2015 and the band played festivals like SXSW in Austin, Texas in support of the release and went on a US tour to perform together with Milky Chance.

2016 was a year of turning points and upheavals, also for the band whose members took a break after two years of uninterrupted touring and left Berlin to temporarily return to their home countries. They all reunited in Washington State, not far from Ian's hometown, where the band retreated to the studio of producer Ryan Hadlock (The Lumineers, Vance Joy, etc.). It was there that they recorded Dreamers, their second album, which was released on March 24, 2017 on Universal Music. The band went on a sold-out Europe tour in spring, a North American tour in September and a follow-up European tour in November and December 2017. Just before the band started off for their winter tour, they self-released a 4-track EP called Storm.

In the summer of 2018 they played several European festivals, among them Hurricane Festival and Southside Festival, Traumzeit Festival, Zermatt Unplugged and a Milky Chance & Friends Open Air in Berlin.

According to their Instagram page the band has retreated to the studio in autumn 2018 to work on new music.

=== 2020–present: All Things Go & Mexico ===
The band's third studio album, All Things Go, was released on February 7, 2020, via BMG. Their fourth studio album, Mexico, was released on May 7, 2021, via Sony Music.

== Style and influences ==
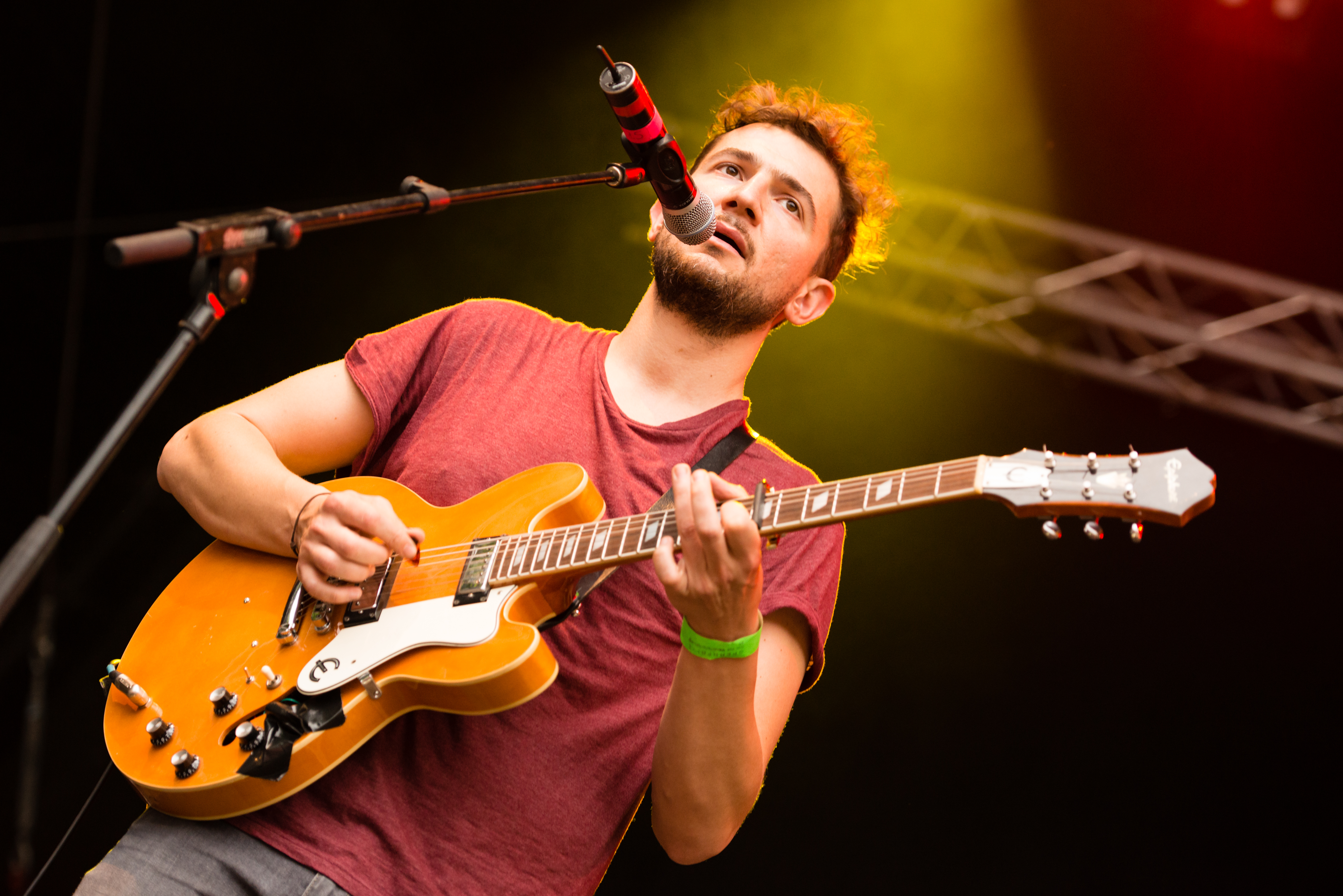
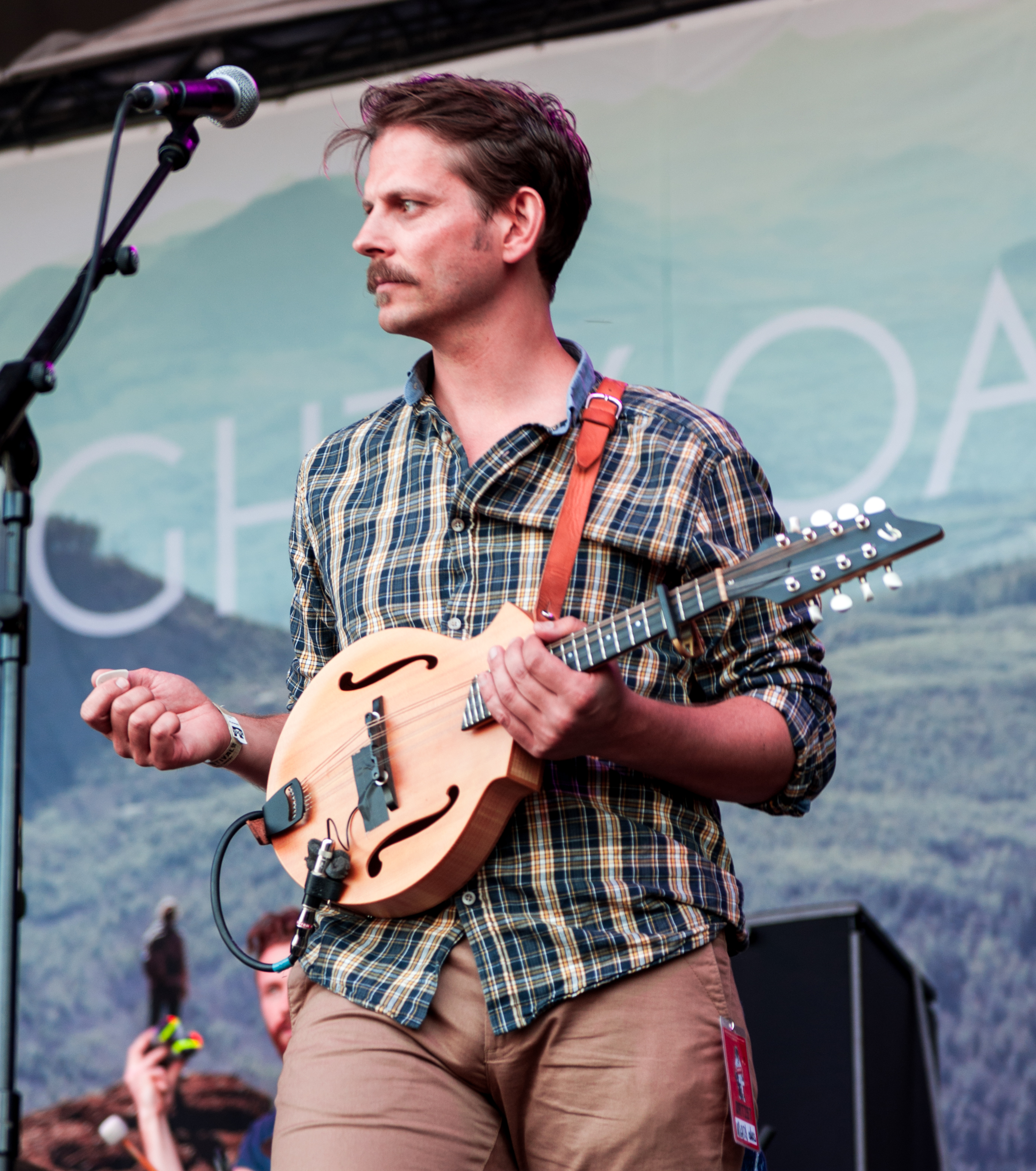
Donzelli (L) and Saunders (R) both handle vocals and variety of string instruments, as does Hooper (not pictured).

According to Allmusic, the group releases "tight, three-part harmonies and effusive, largely acoustic-driven folk anthems." The band's lyrics are mostly autobiographical, often focusing on themes such as nature, family, friendship, love, loss, and beauty. Songs periodically reference the Pacific Northwest of North America, where Hooper is from. All members contribute to the songwriting process.

== Members ==
- Ian Hooper (2010–present) - vocals, acoustic/electric guitar, mandolin, ukulele
- Claudio Donzelli (2010–present) - vocals, electric/acoustic guitar, piano, mandolin, banjo
- Craig Saunders (2010–present) - vocals, bass, mandolin

== Awards and nominations ==
Year	Award	Artist/work	Category	Result	Ref.
2014	1Live Krone Awards	Mighty Oaks	Best Band	Nominated	
2014	European Festival Awards	Mighty Oaks	Newcomer of the Year	Nominated	
2021	Pop Awards	Mighty Oaks	Band/Group of the Year	Nominated	

== Discography ==
=== Albums ===
Albums by Mighty Oaks
Year	Album title	Release details	Chart peaks		
Year	Album title	Release details	GER	AUT	SWI
2014	Howl	Released: February 28, 2014; Label: Capitol / Universal / Vertigo (GER); Format: CD, digital, vinyl	10	39	10
2017	Dreamers	Released: February 23, 2017; Label: Capitol / Universal / Vertigo (GER); Format: CD, digital, vinyl	17	28	38
2020	All Things Go	Released: February 7, 2020; Label: BMG; Format: CD, digital, vinyl	29	—	26
2021	Mexico	Released: May 7, 2021; Label: Sony Music; Format: CD, digital, vinyl	10	19	11
2024	High Times	Released: 13 September 2024; Label: BMG; Format: Digital	48	—	—

=== EPs ===
EPs by Mighty Oaks
Year	Album title	Release details
2011	Driftwood Seat	Released: 2011; Label: Self-released (GER); Format: Digital, CD
2012	Just One Day	Released: Jul 5, 2012; Label: Self-released (Rough Trade distribution); Format: CD, digital
2014	Brother	Released: Oct 7, 2014; Label: Astralwerks / Universal; Format: CD, digital
2017	Storm	Released: Nov 3, 2017; Label: self-released (Rough Trade distribution); Format: digital
2019	Driftwood Seat (Reissue)	Release date: February 1, 2019; Label: Can Can Recordings; Format: digital

=== Singles ===
Singles by Mighty Oaks
Year	Title	Peak chart positions	Album
Year	Title	GER	Album
2014	"Just One Day"	87	Howl
2014	"Brother"	66	Howl
2014	"Back To You"	—	Howl
2016	"Horsehead Bay"	—	Non-album single
2017	"Be with You Always"	—	Dreamers
2017	"Dreamers"	—	Dreamers
2017	"Raise a Glass"	—	Dreamers
2018	"Like an Eagle"	—	Driftwood Seat (Reissue)
2019	"Driftwood Seat"	—	Driftwood Seat (Reissue)
2019	"All Things Go"	—	All Things Go
2019	"Forget Tomorrow"	—	All Things Go
2019	"Lost Again"	—	All Things Go
2020	"Tell Me What You're Thinking"	—	All Things Go
2021	"Mexico"	—	Mexico
2021	"Devil and the Deep Blue Sea"	—	Mexico
2021	"Ghost"	—	Mexico
2021	"Forever"	—	Mexico
2021	"Land of Broken Dreams"	—	Mexico
