= Valeska =

Valeska or Valeška may refer to the following people:

== Given name ==
- Valeska von Gallwitz (1833–1888), German writer
- Valeska Gert (1892–c. 1978), German dancer and cabaret artist
- Valeska Menezes (born 1976), Brazilian volleyball player
- Valeska Röver (1849–1931), German painter
- Valeska Saab (born 1984), Ecuadorian politician, charity worker, model and beauty pageant titleholder
- Valeska Sandoval, Nicaraguan student
- Valeska Steiner (born 1986), Swiss singer and member of the duo Boy
- Valeska Stock (1887–1966), German actress
- Valeska Suratt (1882–1962), American stage and silent film actress
- Sina-Valeska Jung (born 1979), German actress

== Surname ==
- Adolfas Valeška (1905–1994), Lithuanian stained glass artist, painter and stage designer
- Lette Valeska (1885–1985), American photographer, painter and sculptor

== Fictional characters ==
- Jerome and Jeremiah Valeska, recurring characters in Gotham

== See also ==
- 610 Valeska, a main-belt asteroid
- Saved by the Belle, a Three Stooges short that takes place in the fictional country of Valeska.
