= Cobblestone Jazz =

Canadian jazz trio

- Origin: Canada
- Genres: Electronica; IDM; house; jazz
- Years active: 2002–present
- Label: Wagon Repair
- Members: Tyger Dhula; Mathew Jonson; Danuel Tate

Cobblestone Jazz is a Canadian trio based in Victoria, British Columbia, known for their jazz improvisation-influenced approach to making electronic music. The band has been described as "a 21st century jam band, a 'Plastikman-meets-the-Grateful Dead' juggernaut." The band consists of Mathew Jonson, Danuel Tate, and Tyger Dhula. Together with regular collaborator The Mole (Colin de la Plante), the group has also performed as The Modern Deep Left Quartet.

== History ==
The members of Cobblestone Jazz had been jamming and performing together since about 1996. The band was founded in 2002 and began playing electronic jazz music in Victoria. They later did some touring, including a set at Mutek 2003 in Montreal and performance in Madrid, Spain. They recorded some tracks, including "Dumptruck" and “India In Me”, in 2006.

In 2007, the group released a double album, 23 Seconds, through the German label !K7, featuring a studio and a live disc.

In 2008, the band toured in the United States, and in 2009 the trio was joined by a fourth musician, Colin de la Plante, and performed at festivals as The Modern Deep Left Quartet. In 2010, this lineup released an album with leanings more toward electronic music influences than jazz. Reviews were fairly positive.

In 2015, the band performed in Japan and released an EP, Northern Lights.

The group played at the Houghton Festival in the UK in 2017. They performed at the Caprices Festival in 2018. As of 2021, they were slated to appear at the 2022 NEOPOP Electronic Music Festival but they no longer have a website.

== Discography ==
=== Albums ===
Year	Album	Label	Reviews
2007	23 Seconds	!K7	Allmusic; Resident Advisor
2010	The Modern Deep Left Quartet	Wagon Repair !K7	Resident Advisor

=== Extended plays ===
Year	EP	Label	Reviews
2002	5th Element EP	Itiswhatitis Recordings	
2005	The Live EP	Itiswhatitis Recordings	
2006	The Creator EP	Itiswhatitis Recordings	Resident Advisor
2006	Dump Truck	Wagon Repair	
2006	India in Me	Wagon Repair	Resident Advisor
2007	DMT	Wagon Repair	
2007	Put the Lime in Da Coconut	Wagon Repair	Resident Advisor
2009	Traffic Jam EP	Wagon Repair	Resident Advisor
2010	Chance EP	Wagon Repair	
2011	Lunar Lander	Wagon Repair	
2011	Memories (From Where You Are)	Wagon Repair	Resident Advisor
2015	Northern Lights	Itiswhatitis Recordings	
2023	Hip Waders	Live and Death	
