= Lyte Records =

- Founded: 2007
- Founder: David Lyttle
- Distributor: Universal Music Group
- Genre: Various
- Country of origin: Northern Ireland
- Location: Belfast
- Official website: www.lyterecords.com

Lyte Records is an independent record label founded and owned by Northern Irish musician and producer David Lyttle.

== Artists ==
- Tom Harrison
- David Lyttle
- Nigel Mooney
- Jason Rebello
- Jean Toussaint
- Andreas Varady
