= In Your Own Sweet Way =

1955 jazz standard by Dave Brubeck

- Cover of 2007 CD with alternative take

Instrumental by Dave Brubeck

from the album Brubeck Plays Brubeck
- Written: c. 1952
- Published: 1955
- Released: July 16, 1956
- Recorded: April 18–19, 1956
- Length: 5:01
- Composer: Dave Brubeck
- Producer: George Avakian

Official audio
- "In Your Own Sweet Way" on YouTube

"In Your Own Sweet Way" is a 1955 jazz standard, and one of the most famous compositions by Dave Brubeck. It was written around 1952, but its copyright notice was dated 1955. Brubeck's wife Iola, for whom the song was written, later wrote a lyric for the song, which led to singers such as Carmen McRae recording it. "In Your Own Sweet Way" was first released on Brubeck's 1956 studio album Brubeck Plays Brubeck; an earlier live recording is known.

== Composition ==
"In Your Own Sweet Way" is written in the key of B flat major, and is a jazz ballad in thirty-two-bar form with an eight-bar interlude typically played between each chorus. The author of the 1996 biography It's About Time: The Dave Brubeck Story, Fred Hall, said that this jazz standard, like other standards, such as "Take Five", has been performed by "various Brubeck combinations" and many other artists. All Music Guide to Jazz notes the "contrasting lines" of the piece,

In the liner notes to Time Signatures Brubeck wrote, "For the first few years the quartet played almost all standards, until one day Paul Desmond said to me, 'We've got to hire somebody to write some material for us.' I said, 'Paul, are you kidding? I'll write two tunes in half an hour!' I wrote 'In Your Own Sweet Way' and 'The Waltz' that night. From then on we started doing my material a lot more."

== Release ==
Although at least one earlier concert recording is known, the song's first release, with three improvised choruses, was on Brubeck's 1956 solo album Brubeck Plays Brubeck. The first quartet version appeared on the 1956 album Dave Brubeck and Jay & Kai at Newport, issued on the Columbia label. An orchestral arrangement of the piece by Howard Brubeck appeared on the quartet's live 1963 album Brandenburg Gate: Revisited.

== Legacy and renditions ==
Many jazz artists have covered "In Your Own Sweet Way". Miles Davis recorded it twice with his quintet in 1956—once in March with Sonny Rollins as the quintet's saxophonist (on Collectors' Items) and in May with John Coltrane in the band (on Workin' with the Miles Davis Quintet). According to jazz historian Ted Gioia, "Davis probably deserves as much credit as Brubeck for establishing 'In Your Own Sweet Way' as a jazz standard", partly because Davis closed "the A theme with an E natural, instead of the F that Brubeck intended. The prevalence of this Davis 'flat five'—which imparts a wry off-centeredness to the proceedings—in later performances is one measure of the trumpeter's influence in the dissemination of this song."

In 1960, jazz guitarist Wes Montgomery covered the standard on his fourth album The Incredible Jazz Guitar of Wes Montgomery. Composer and arranger Clare Fischer recorded a solo piano version in 1963, which was featured on his album Easy Livin' three years later. The Keith Jarrett Trio played it live on several occasions collected on Keith Jarrett at the Blue Note and the Tokyo 1993 gig found on the Live in Japan 93/96 DVD. Jazz fusion guitarist John Etheridge recorded a well-received version for his 1994 album Ash. Art Farmer and Lee Konitz covered it in 1994 with the Joe Carter Quartet and Trio, as did pianist Robert Glasper in 2006. Jacky Terrasson and Stéphane Belmondo included the song in their 2016 album Mother.

The song title gave its name to the 2010 documentary film about Brubeck, produced by Clint Eastwood, Dave Brubeck: In His Own Sweet Way. In 2013, keyboardist Bob James was inspired by "In Your Own Sweet Way" to compose his song "You Better Not Go to College" in homage to Brubeck.

A vocal version by Norma Winstone with lyrics written by Margaret Busby was released in 2019 by Enodoc Records on the CD In Concert, a remastered recording of an August 1988 performance by Winstone and pianist John Taylor at London's Guildhall School of Music and Drama.
