= Grégoire Maret =

Swiss jazz harmonica player (born 1975)

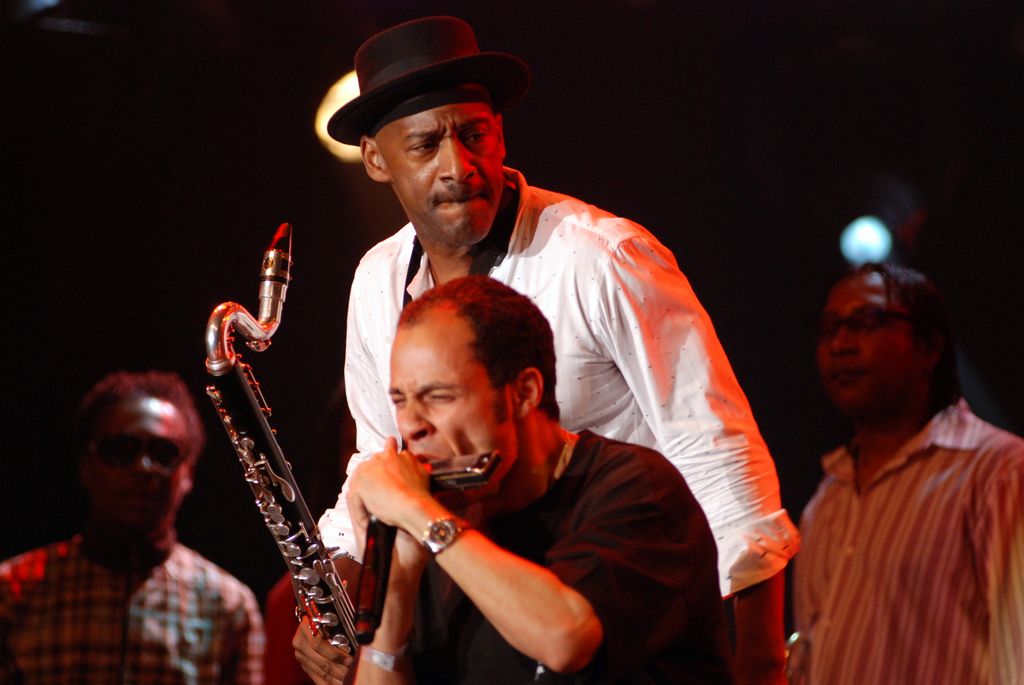
- Maret and Marcus Miller at the North Sea Jazz Festival, 2007

Background information
- Born: May 13, 1975 (age 51); Geneva, Switzerland
- Origin: New York City
- Genres: Jazz
- Occupation: Musician
- Instrument: Harmonica
- Labels: ObliqSound, Universal, Sunnyside
- Website: www.gregoiremaret.com

Grégoire Maret (born May 13, 1975) is a jazz harmonica player.

== Background ==
Maret studied at Conservatoire de Musique de Genève, then The New School in New York City. On March 13, 2012 Maret released his first album as a leader. He has worked with Steve Coleman, Kurt Elling, Pat Metheny, Andy Milne, Meshell Ndegeocello, David Sanborn, Jacky Terrasson, and Cassandra Wilson. In 2003 he was the subject of Swiss filmmaker Frédéric Baillif's documentary Sideman.

== Discography ==
=== As leader or co-leader ===
| Year | Album | Artist | Label |
|---|---|---|---|
| 2007 | Scenarios | Andy Milne & Grégoire Maret | ObliqSound |
| 2012 | Grégoire Maret | Grégoire Maret | eOne |
| 2016 | Wanted | Grégoire Maret | Sunnyside |
| 2020 | Americana | Grégoire Maret, Romain Collin, and Bill Frisell | ACT Music |
| 2024 | Ennio | Grégoire Marret, Romain Collin | ACT Music |

=== As sideman or guest ===
| Album | Artist | Year |
|---|---|---|
| Holding Back the Years | Jimmy Scott | 1998 |
| New Age of Aquarius | Andy Milne's Cosmic Dapp Theory | 1999 |
| What It Is | Jacky Terrasson | 1999 |
| Inside | David Sanborn | 1999 |
| Mood Indigo | Jimmy Scott | 2000 |
| Over the Rainbow | Jimmy Scott | 2001 |
| The Simple Life | Leon Parker | 2001 |
| A Paris... | Jacky Terrasson | 2001 |
| The Ascension to Light | Steve Coleman and Five Elements | 2001 |
| Bar Talk | Jeff "Tain" Watts | 2002 |
| Cookie: The Anthropological Mixtape | Meshell Ndegeocello | 2002 |
| And Friends | Veit Hübner | 2002 |
| Rock Island | Bethany Yarrow | 2003 |
| You've Never Seen Everything | Bruce Cockburn | 2003 |
| Glamoured | Cassandra Wilson | 2003 |
| Right Now Move | Charlie Hunter Quintet | 2003 |
| Y'all Just Don't Know | Dapp Theory | 2003 |
| All in That Sky | Gabriele Donati | 2003 |
| Moonglow | Jimmy Scott | 2003 |
| It Doesn't Matter | Lou Watson | 2003 |
| Crossing Jordan Soundtrack | Various artists | 2003 |
| Mystery to Me | Janek Gwizdala | 2004 |
| Someone to Tell | Ari Hest | 2004 |
| Costume | Brandon Ross | 2004 |
| Bebel Gilberto | Bebel Gilberto | 2004 |
| Lucidarium | Steve Coleman and Five Elements | 2004 |
| Tales of the Stuttering Mime | Eric Revis | 2004 |
| The Voice Within | Fabio Morgera | 2004 |
| Irreplaceable | George Benson | 2004 |
| Shapeshifter | Matthew Garrison | 2004 |
| Carnets de bord | Bernard Lavilliers | 2005 |
| El Hombre | Carlos "Patato" Valdes | 2005 |
| One Foot in the Swamp | John Ellis | 2005 |
| The Spirit Music Jamia: Dance of the Infidel | Meshell Ndegeocello | 2005 |
| Silver Rain | Marcus Miller | 2005 |
| Remember Their Innocence | Onaje Allan Gumbs | 2005 |
| The Way Up | Pat Metheny Group | 2005 |
| Native Lands | Will Calhoun | 2005 |
| State of Mind | Raul Midón | 2005 |
| Thunderbird | Cassandra Wilson | 2006 |
| Huge in Japan | Dario Boente | 2006 |
| Side-by-Side | Francis Jacob | 2006 |
| Hugmars | Hugh Marsh | 2006 |
| Brazilian Dreamin' | Joe Beck Trio | 2006 |
| Virgin Forest | Lionel Loueke | 2006 |
| Who Let the Cats Out? | Mike Stern | 2006 |
| Nightmoves | Kurt Elling | 2007 |
| Be the True Revolution | Kyra Gaunt | 2007 |
| 2 | Nega | 2007 |
| The Movie | Clare & the Reasons | 2007 |
| Wolno | Marek Napiórkowski | 2007 |
| A Tribute to Joni Mitchell | Various artists | 2007 |
| Piano Man | Philippe Saisse | 2007 |
| Architect of the Silent Moment | Scott Colley | 2007 |
| Make Someone Happy | Sophie Milman | 2007 |
| Echo | Alyssa Graham | 2008 |
| Marcus | Marcus Miller | 2008 |
| Chasing Shadows | Tony Grey | 2008 |
| Far From Home | Beat Kaestli | 2009 |
| Freewheel | Stade | 2009 |
| In the Middle of It All | In the Middle of It All | 2009 |
| More to Say | Terri Lyne Carrington | 2009 |
| The Search Within | Sean Jones | 2009 |
| Songs in the Key of New York | Clare & Jeremy | 2009 |
| Triptych | Justin Vasquez | 2009 |
| The Ten Shades of Blues | Richard Bona | 2009 |
| Inner Dance | Fabrizio Sotti | 2010 |
| Push | Jacky Terrasson | 2010 |
| Puppet Mischief | John Ellis and Double-Wide | 2010 |
| Orchestre de Chambre Miniature, Vol. 1 | Olivier Manchon | 2010 |
| Haunted Love | Andrés Garcia & The Ghost | 2011 |
| Highest Praise | Manifest | 2011 |
| The Eleventh Hour | Johnathan Blake | 2012 |
| Blue, Vol. 1 | Jeff "Tain" Watts | 2015 |
| Blue, Vol. 2 | Jeff "Tain" Watts | 2016 |
| From This Place | Pat Metheny | 2020 |
| Embracing Dawn | Christian Sands | 2024 |
| Nueva Timba | Harold López-Nussa | 2025 |
