= Ali Jackson (jazz drummer) =

Jazz drummer

Ali Jackson Jr.
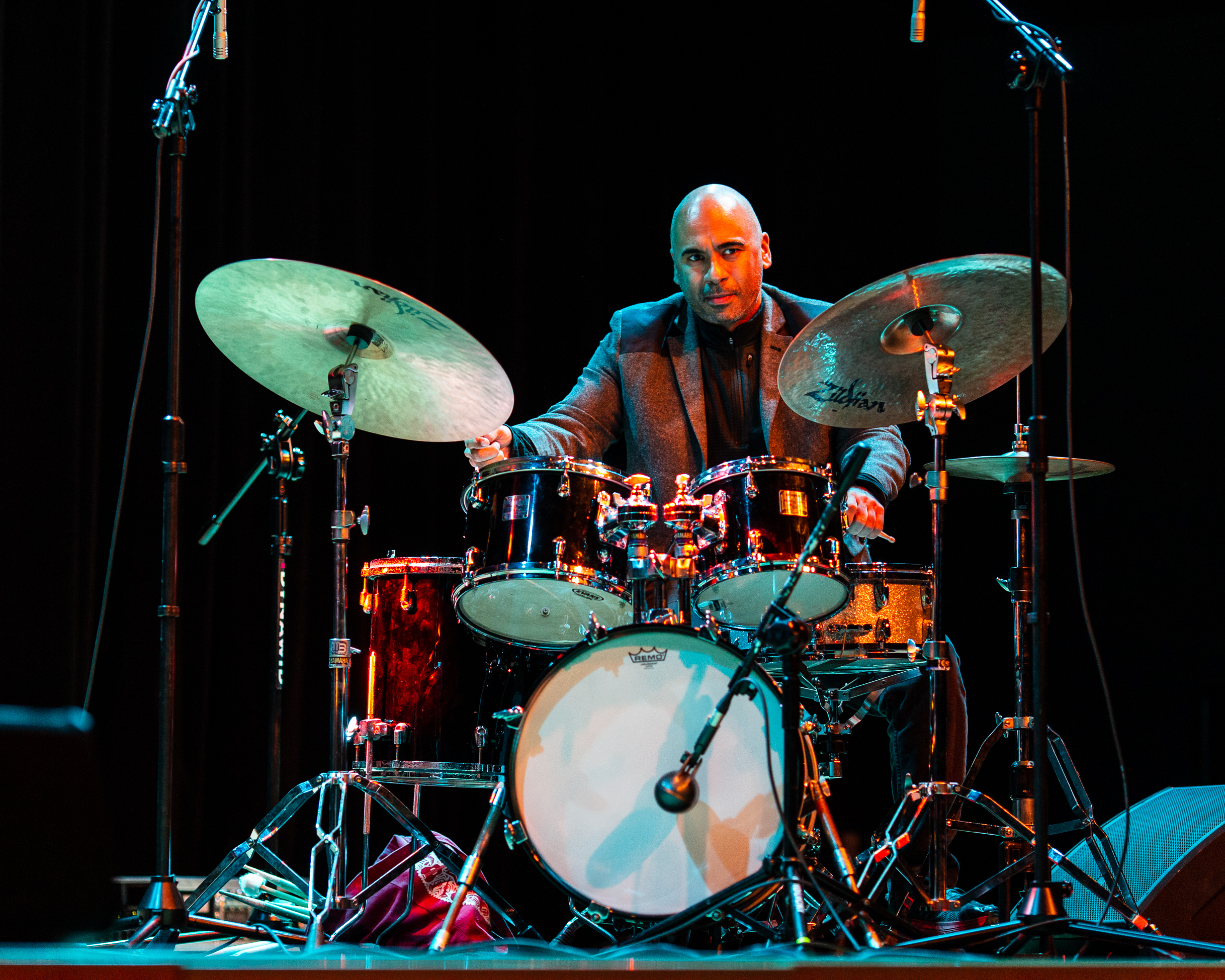
- Ali Jackson, 2019

Background information
- Born: April 3, 1976 (age 49); Detroit, Michigan, U.S.
- Genres: Jazz, Ancestral, Afro-Cuban
- Occupations: Musician, Composer, Arranger, Educator
- Instruments: Drums, classical percussion, piano
- Labels: BigWenzee
- Website: alidrums.com

Ali Jackson Jr. (born April 3, 1976) is an American drummer, musician, composer, arranger, educator, and percussionist.

== Early life and education ==
Jackson was born in Detroit in 1976, the son of jazz bassist, Ali Jackson. Jackson graduated as a music major with high honors from Detroit’s Cass Technical High School.

As a student at the New School University for Contemporary Music in New York City, he studied with Max Roach and Elvin Jones. He attended college on a full academic scholarship, earning an undergraduate degree in music composition.

== Music career ==
Jackson started playing drums at the age of 2. Jackson received a steady stream of lessons and mentoring from a range of artists including Max Roach, Milt Hinton, Dr. Donald Byrd, Betty Carter, Aretha Franklin and James Mtume. During one lesson when he was 12, Ali met Wynton Marsalis and impressed the trumpet player.

In 1994, Jackson was selected as the guest soloist for the Beacons of Jazz program honoring jazz drummer Max Roach. The Thelonious Monk Institute and Jazz Aspen selected him to participate in the first annual Jazz Aspen for gifted and talented musicians. Jackson was also the first recipient of the state of Michigan’s Artserv Emerging Artist award in 1998.

A reviewer for The New York Times in 2009 wrote that "Jackson generates a subtle but irresistible force when he plays, making even the smallest gestures advance his agenda of locomotion."

== Personal ==
Ali is the father of professional soccer player Aziel Jackson.

== Discography ==
=== As leader or co-leader ===
- Groove at Jazz en Tete (Blue Geodesics, 2000)
- Gold Sounds with James Carter, Cyrus Chestnut, Reginald Veal (Brown Brothers, 2005)
- Big Brown Get Down Vol.1 (BigWenzee Music, 2007)
- Wheelz Keep Rollin' (BigWenzee Music, 2008)
- Yes! (2012) with Yes! Trio (Aaron Goldberg & Omer Avital)
- Amalgamations (Sunnyside, 2014)
- Groove Du Jour (2019) with Yes! Trio
- Big Brown Get Down Vol. 2 (BigWenzee Music, 2021)

=== As sideman ===
With Buster Williams

- Joined at the Hip (2002)

With Craig Handy

- Reflections in Change (Sirocco Music, 1999)
- Flow (2000)

With Lincoln Center Jazz Orchestra

- Congo Square (2007)
- Portrait in Seven Shades composed by Ted Nash (2010) Grammy Winner
- Vitoria Suite (2010)
- Wynton Marsalis and Eric Clapton Play the Blues (2011)
- Live in Cuba (2015)
- Big Band Holidays (2015)
- The Abyssinian Mass" (2016)
- The Music of John Lewis (2017)
- Handful of Keys (2017)
- Una Noche con Rubén Blades (2018)
- Big Band Holidays (2019)
- Sherman Irby's Inferno (2020)
- The Music of Wayne Shorter feat. Wayne Shorter (2020)

With Wynton Marsalis

- The Magic Hour (2004)
- From the Plantation to the Penitentiary (2007)
- Willie Nelson and Wynton Marsalis Play the Music of Ray Charles (2009)
- Two Men with Blues (2009) with Willie Nelson
- He and She (2009)
- From Billie Holiday to Edith Piaf: Live in Marciac (2010) with Richard Galliano

With Joshua Redman

- Back East (2007)

With Kurt Rosenwinkel

- Deep Song (2005)

With others

- Last Chance for Common Sense, Rodney Kendrick (1997)
- I Got Next, KRS-One (1997)
- Gunn Fu, Russell Gunn (1997)
- Blues for the New Millennium, Marcus Roberts (1997)
- Into the Blue, Emmanuel Pahud and Jacky Terrasson (2003)
- Irreplaceable, George Benson (2004)
- The Ancient Art of Giving, Omer Avital (2006)
- Noir, Anat Cohen (2007)
- Live at Yoshi's (2010), Dee Dee Bridgewater
- Spirityouall, Bobby McFerrin (2013)
- 53, Jacky Terrasson (2019)
