= Take This =

Studio album by Jacky Terrasson
- Released: February 24, 2015
- Recorded: September 8–11, 2014
- Studios: Recall Studios, Pompignan, Tarn-et-Garonne, France
- Genre: Jazz
- Length: 45:17
- Label: Impulse!
- Producer: Jean-Philippe Allard

Jacky Terrasson chronology
Gouache (2012)	Take This (2015)	Mother (2016)

Professional ratings
Review scores
Source	Rating
AllMusic	3.5/5 stars
Financial Times	4/5 stars
Jazz Forum	4/5 stars
Jazzwise	4/5 stars
Tom Hull	B+
UK Vibe	4/5

Take This is a studio album by French jazz pianist and composer Jacky Terrasson. The album was recorded in Pompignan, France in September 2014 and released on February 24, 2015 by Impulse!. The album title derives from Paul Desmond's song "Take Five". The record contains 11 tracks: four Terrasson's originals are laced through a typically eclectic mix of covers.

== Reception ==
Matt Collar of AllMusic mentioned, "Pianist Jacky Terrasson's Impulse! Records debut, 2015's Take This, is a sophisticated showcase for his virtuoso jazz chops and eclectic musical taste." Mike Hobart of Financial Times stated, "Nobody reconfigures the core modernist repertoire with such daring and panache as the French/American pianist Jacky Terrasson. The imaginative tweaks and unexpected juxtapositions on his new CD transform Bud Powell’s classic “Un Poco Loco” into virtuosic Latin jazz and Paul Desmond’s “Take Five” into silky Afro-funk." Nate Chinen of The New York Times observed, "“Take This,” Mr. Terrasson’s new album, isn’t so much about a band. Recorded in France, it’s a brisk showcase for an international rhythm coalition..." Jeff Tamarkin writing for JazzTimes noted, "Take This is a feast of sonic exploration, and though that same degree of daring inhabits most of the other covers, so be it... There’s excitement and ingenuity embedded throughout these wholly original, shrewdly executed arrangements..."

== Track listing ==
1. Kiff (Terrasson) - 3:37
2. Un Poco Loco (Bud Powell) - 4:17
3. Take Five (Take 1) (Paul Desmond) - 5:16
4. Come Together (John Lennon, Paul McCartney) - 3:28
5. Dance (Terrasson) - 3:24
6. Blue in Green (Miles Davis) - 3:03
7. November (Terrasson) - 6:28
8. Take Five (Take 2) (Paul Desmond) - 4:16
9. Maladie d'Amour (Henri Salvador, Marc Lanjean, Léona Gabriel) - 3:19
10. Somebody That I Used to Know (Luiz Bonfá, Walter André De Backer) - 3:37
11. Letting Go (Terrasson) - 4:40

== Personnel ==
- Jacky Terrasson – human beatbox, percussion, piano, synthesizer, vocals
- Adama Diarra – percussion
- Sly Johnson – human beatbox, vocals
- Lukmil Pérez – drums
- Burniss Travis – bass (electric), double bass

== Charts ==
Chart performance for Take This
Chart (2015)	Peak position
French Albums (SNEP)	150
