= Elisabeth Kontomanou =

French jazz singer and composer (born 1961)

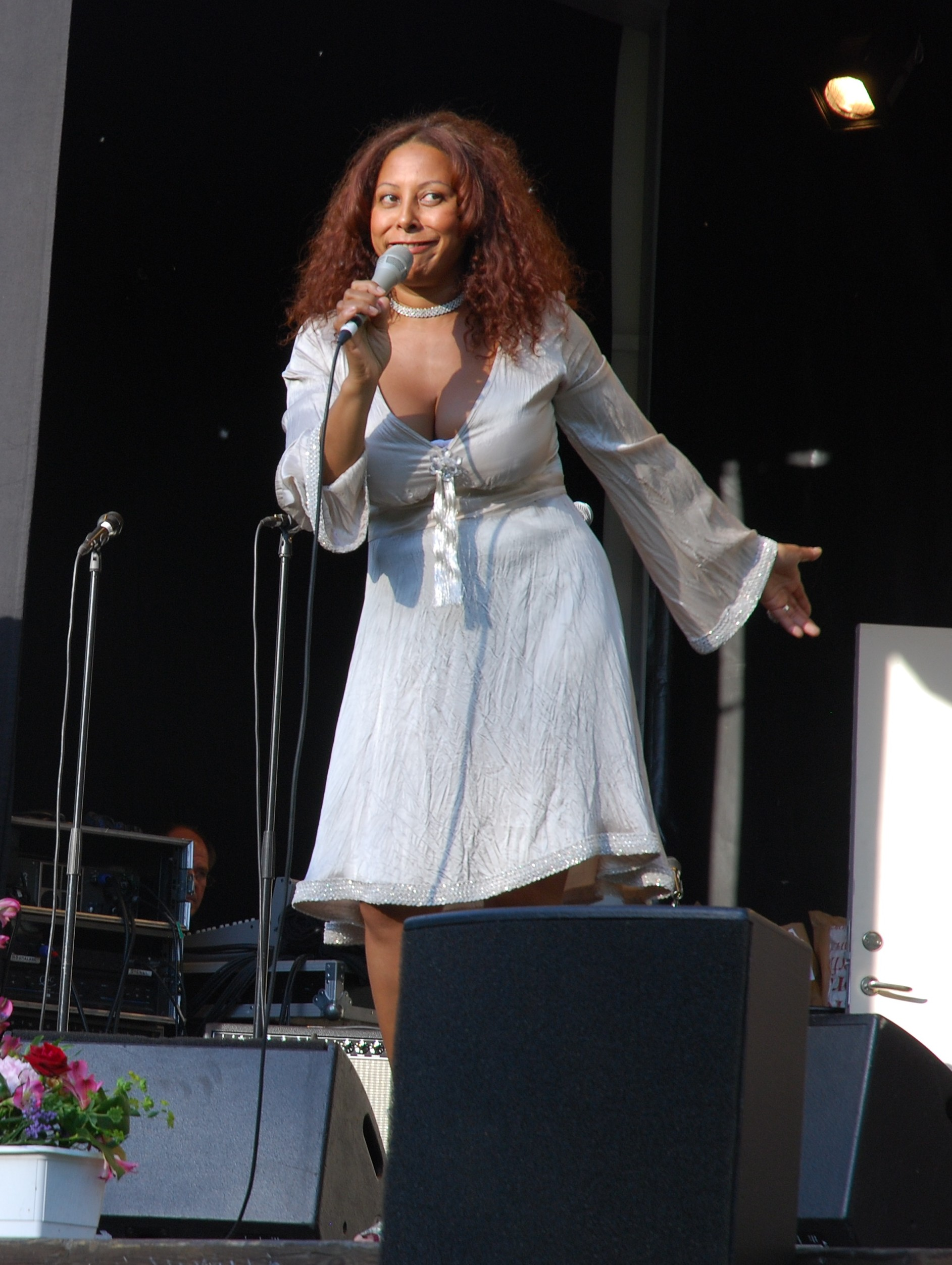

Background information
- Born: 30 November 1961 (age 63) Lyon, France
- Genres: Jazz
- Occupation: Singer

Elisabeth Kontomanou (born 30 November 1961) is a French jazz singer and composer who has lived in America and Sweden.

== Life ==
Kontomanou was born in Sète (France) in 1961. She moved to New York in the 1990s and then on to Stockholm, where she was based when she recorded Back to My Groove. This album includes covers of songs which she sings in English.

In 1986, she founded the quartet Conversation, which won the La Défense Jazz Festival competition. In 1986, she was hired by Michel Legrand for the movie Moon Mask while the pianist Alain Jean-Marie organized her tour of the Antilles. In 1995, she went to New York. Ten years later, she moved to Paris, where she composed the song "Waiting for Spring" and the album Back to My Groove. In 2008, she released the album Brewin' the Blues.

In 2006 and 2014, she appeared at the Montreal International Jazz Festival. In 2013, she appeared at the Tan Jazz Festival.

In 2006, she won the Vocal Jazz Award of the Victoires du Jazz.

Kontomanou has worked with Michel Legrand, Mike Stern, John Scofield, Alain Jean-Marie, Jean-Michel Pilc, Daryl Hall, Franck Amsallem, Toots Thielemans, Richard Bona, Stéphane Belmondo, Jacques Schwarz-Bart, Leon Parker, and Geri Allen.

== Discography ==
- 1998 – Embrace
- 2000 – Hands and Incantation
- 2004 – Midnight Sun
- 2005 – Waitin' for Spring
- 2005 – A Week in Paris (A Tribute to Billy Strayhorn)
- 2007 – Back to My Groove
- 2008 – Brewin' the Blues
- 2009 – Siren Song – Live at Arsenal
- 2012 - Secret of the Wind with Geri Allen
- 2014 - Amoureuse
