= Sara Lazarus =

American jazz singer (born 1962)

- Born: April 1, 1962; Wilmington, Delaware, U.S.
- Genres: Jazz, vocal jazz
- Occupations: Singer, musician
- Instruments: Vocals, saxophone
- Years active: 1984–present
- Label: Dreyfus
- Website: www.saralazarus.com

Sara Lazarus (born April 1, 1962) is an American jazz singer who lives in France.

== Music career ==
Lazarus was born in Wilmington, Delaware, and began piano lessons when she was eight. She was a member of the band in school, playing tenor saxophone with the American Youth Orchestra at the age of 16 and touring Europe. She attended Harvard University, studied English literature, and performed with locals bands on vocals and saxophone. After graduation, she moved to France, where she met up with Illinois Jacquet, whom she had met at Harvard. She toured with Jacquet's band as a vocalist and performed with Patrice Caratini, Jacky Terrasson, and Franck Amsallem.

In 1994, she won first prize at the Thelonious Monk Competition, where the jury included veteran jazz vocalists Jon Hendricks, Dianne Reeves, Jimmy Scott, Cleo Laine, Shirley Horn, and Abbey Lincoln.

She moved back to France, where she lived with her husband, saxophonist Eric Breton. Her debut album was released in 2005 and featured Gypsy jazz guitarist Biréli Lagrène. His Gypsy Project band joined her on her second album two years later.

== Discography ==
- Give Me the Simple Life (Dreyfus, 2005)
- It's All Right With Me (Dreyfus, 2007)
- Discover: Sara Lazarus (Dreyfus, 2008)
