= Mother (Jacky Terrasson and Stéphane Belmondo album) =

Studio album by Jacky Terrasson, Stéphane Belmondo
- Released: September 2, 2016
- Recorded: Fall of 2015, April 2016
- Studio: Recall Studios, France
- Genre: Jazz
- Length: 47:46
- Label: Impulse!
- Producer: Jean-Philippe Allard, Jacky Terrasson, Stéphane Belmondo

Jacky Terrasson chronology
Take This (2015)	Mother (2016)	53 (2019)

Mother is a collaborative studio album of jazz pianist Jacky Terrasson and jazz trumpeter Stéphane Belmondo. The album was recorded in Pompignan, France and released on September 2, 2016, by Impulse! Records. This is Terrasson's second release for Impulse! The album contains 14 tracks, a mix of jazz standards and the originals written by bandmembers. The title track of the album, the melancholic ballad "Mother", has already appeared on Terrasson's album Gouache released in 2012. Originally, the album was supposed to be called Twin Spirit, but the duo chose to name it Mother due to the memory of Terrasson's suddenly deceased mother.

== Reception ==
Jan Kyncl of Czech Radio stated, "The album Mother will certainly withstand a comparison with the top in its category... Of course, Belmondo and Terrasson could not avoid this strong influence, but they managed to grasp it in their own way and create a distinctive work that undoubtedly deserves the attention of the listeners." A review by jpc wrote, "In a session that is as intimate as it is musically highly concentrated, the two fully indulge in their diverse song repertoire of standards, jazz classics and French chanson pearls. The result is swinging, conscious of tradition, but also artistic and mature in musical stringency." Claude Loxhay of Jazz Around Magazine observed, "Here they are reunited for an intimate duo all in empathic complicity, as did, before them, Chet Baker with Paul Bley, Enrico Rava with Stefano Bollani, Kenny Wheeler with John Taylor, Paolo Fresu with Uri Caine or Martial Solal with Dave Douglas."

== Track listing ==
1. First Song (Charlie Haden) – 3:16
2. Hand in Hand (Terrasson) – 4:42
3. Lover Man (Jimmy Davis, Roger Ramirez, James Sherman) – 4:52
4. La Chanson d'Hélène (Philippe Sarde) – 3:47
5. In Your Own Sweet Way (Dave Brubeck) – 5:22
6. Pic Saint-Loup (Belmondo, Terrasson) – 0:42
7. Mother (Terrasson) – 5:30
8. Fun Keys (Terrasson) – 2:30
9. Les Valseuses (Stéphane Grappelli) – 1:16
10. Souvenirs (Belmondo) – 3:47
11. You Don't Know What Love Is (Gene DePaul, Don Raye) – 4:36
12. Pompignan (Belmondo, Terrasson) – 0:54
13. You Are the Sunshine of My Life (Stevie Wonder) – 4:53
14. Que reste-t-il de nos amours ? (Léo Chauliac, Charles Trénet) – 2:06

== Personnel ==
- Jacky Terrasson – piano, producer
- Stéphane Belmondo – flugelhorn, trumpet, producer
- Jean-Philippe Allard – producer

== Charts ==
Chart performance for Mother
Chart (2016)	Peak position
French Albums (SNEP)	130
