= Maladie d'amour (song) =

"Maladie d'Amour" (French: Love Sickness) is a popular folk tune of the French West Indies recorded for the first time in 1931 by Léona Gabriel but popularised in the arrangement by Henri Salvador published in 1949. The published lyrics of Marc Lanjean begin: "Maladie d’amour,/ Maladie des amoureux / Si tu n’aimes que moi / Reste tout près de moi". However Salvador himself often sang the song in French Creole with the lyrics "Maladi damour, Maladi dé zamoureu, Chacha si’w enmen-mwen, Wa maché dèyè-mwen", a tribute to a chacha, meaning an older woman sweet on a younger man.

The song became a standard among French singers, being sung among others by Jean Sablon, Sacha Distel, Élisabeth Jérôme (fr), La Compagnie créole (fr), Manu Dibango, David Martial (fr) and Jacob Desvarieux (fr).

== English version ==
The song is better known in English-speaking countries by the English version with lyrics by Leo Johns to an adapted French title "Melodie d'Amour" (French: "Melody of Love") by The Ames Brothers which was first released by RCA Victor as catalog number 47-7046 in 1957. The new English lyrics by Leo Johns begin "Melodie d'amour, take this song to my lover. Shoo shoo little bird, go and find my love." This song featured an electric harpsichord, in a rhumba rhythm. The Ames brothers version first reached the Billboard magazine charts on October 7, 1957. On the Disk Jockey chart, it peaked at #5; on the Best Seller chart, at #12; on the composite chart of the top 100 songs, it reached #12. In Canada it reached #5 on the CHUM Charts.

== Other versions ==
Other vocal versions appeared from Edmundo Ros who sung the version in English with his orchestra, and the single appeared on the Variety magazine charts in 1957. The Ray Conniff Singers released a version of "Melodie D'Amour" (1964).

Instrumental versions appeared from The Moontrekkers "Night Of The Vampire" / "Melodie D'Amore" Parlophone - UK - R 4814 and Lawrence Welk and his Orchestra "Calcutta" (Nicolette) / "Melodie D'amour" - London - UK - HLD 9261 1961

Dean Martin adapted the first line of the lyrics and title to "Cha Cha Cha De Amor" on Capitol (1962). Martin's "Cha Cha Cha D'Amour" was arranged from the Johns and Salvador version into a cha cha by arranger Nelson Riddle.

In Europe Angèle Durand sang a version to a German text by Glando.Jason Kouchak recorded the song on his 2008 Comme d’Habitude album. The Dutch singer Linda Petterson Bratt (born 1958) covered the song as "Weet Je Wat Ik Wil" in 1977 to words and arrangement by Lanjean and N. Hiltrop. Jazz pianist Jacky Terrasson included the song in his 2015 album Take This.

== Use in popular culture ==
In 1962, Maladie d'amour was played by Nina van Pallandt and Frederik van Pallandt in The Sold Grandfather directed by Hans Albin.
