= 53 (album) =

Studio album by Jacky Terrasson
- Released: September 27, 2019
- Recorded: June 12–19, 2019
- Studios: Recall Studios, Pompignan, France
- Genre: Jazz
- Length: 56:15
- Label: Blue Note
- Producer: Jacky Terrasson

Jacky Terrasson chronology
Mother (2016)	53 (2019)

Professional ratings
Review scores
Source	Rating
AllMusic	4/5 stars

53 is a studio album by jazz pianist Jacky Terrasson. The album, his fifteenth, was recorded in Pompignan, France and released on September 27, 2019 by Blue Note Records.

== Background ==
The album, his 15th, marks his 53rd birthday and 25 years since his debut release for Blue Note. Terrasson explained, "Why 53? Quite simply because I will have conceived and recorded this music during my 53rd year and that on this occasion, I wanted to make a record that really resembles me. With this record, I wanted to give myself completely, to take risks, while assuming my career, my choices artistic..." The release contains 16 tracks: 15 originals written by Terrason and one composition by Wolfgang Amadeus Mozart.

== Reception ==
Matt Collar of AllMusic stated, "Jacky Terrasson's 2019 studio album, 53, is an engaging, deeply nuanced set that reflects his ever-deepening artistic maturity. An inventive, technically adept "young lion", Terrasson has continued to refine his style over the years. Here he displays a broad range of rhythmic and harmonic colors." Steven Wine of The Associated Press wrote, "Not that the package is skimpy. Terrasson serves up a generous 56 minutes of terrific piano trio music via 16 compositions, most less than four minutes in length. There's no flab, no showboat soloing and lots of lovely ensemble work as Terrasson and his colleagues explore various moods and melodies." Claude Loxhay of Jazz Halo mentioned, "An album which perfectly illustrates the technical mastery of Jacky Terrasson as well as his passionate temperament."

== Track listing ==
All tracks are written by Jacky Terrasson except track 11 written by Wolfgang Amadeus Mozart.

1. The Call – 4:03
2. Alma – 4:20
3. Mirror – 1:49
4. Jump! – 3:02
5. Kiss Jannett for Me – 7:13
6. Palindrome – 3:31
7. La Part Des Anges – 3:36
8. Babyplum – 3:13
9. What Happenes Au 6eme – 1:45
10. My Lys – 6:28
11. Lacrimosa – Mozart: Requiem in D Minor – 1:24
12. Nausica – 3:38
13. This Is Mine – 4:45
14. La Part Des Anges (Reprise) – 2:04
15. Blues En Femmes Majeures – 2:06
16. Resilience – 3:19

== Personnel ==
- Jacky Terrasson – piano, vocals
- Thomas Bramerie – bass
- Philippe Gaillot – vocals
- Gregory Hutchinson – drums
- Ali Jackson – drums
- Stephane Menut – vocals
- Lukmil Pérez – drums
- Geraud Portal – bass, bass (electric)
- Sylvain Romano – bass
