= Scenarios (album) =

Studio album by Andy Milne & Grégoire Maret
- Released: June 27, 2007
- Genre: Jazz
- Length: 46:49
- Label: ObliqSound
- Producer: Michele Locatelli

Andy Milne chronology
Dreams & False Alarms (2007)	Scenarios (2007)	Layers Of Chance (2008)

Grégoire Maret chronology
Scenarios (2007)	Grégoire Maret (2012)

Scenarios is a duet album by pianist Andy Milne and harmonica player Grégoire Maret. It was released in 2007. It is Maret's first and only album as a co-leader to date (he later went on to record his own debut album in 2012). The album is primarily focused on originals and improvisations, and is a duet effort with the exception of Anne Drummond's alto flute on "Crystal Labyrinth" and Thelonious Monk Jazz Vocal Competition winner Gretchen Parlato adding vocals to the standard Moon River.

It received a four-star rating from AllMusic, which noted, "Focusing primarily on originals and improvisations, the pair make a strong team, both men clearly being virtuosos on their respective instruments."

== Track listing ==
No.	Title	Writer(s)	Length
1.	"Headache in Residence"	Andy Milne	4:58
2.	"Pharos of Alexandria" (improvisation no. 1)	Andy Milne & Grégoire Maret	3:43
3.	"As Far As We Know"	Grégoire Maret	4:14
4.	"Con Alma"	Dizzy Gillespie	6:13
5.	"Follow Me" (improvisation no. 6)	Andy Milne & Grégoire Maret	3:36
6.	"House of Fisher" (improvisation no. 9)	Andy Milne & Grégoire Maret	2:56
7.	"Couch Talk"	Andy Milne	5:24
8.	"Steps From Body to Soul"	Andy Milne & Grégoire Maret	8:00
9.	"Intersections" (improvisation no. 3)	Andy Milne & Grégoire Maret	1:20
10.	"Crystal Labyrinth" (featuring Anne Drummond)	Andy Milne	3:09
11.	"Moon River" (featuring Gretchen Parlato)	H. Mancini & Johnny Mercer	3:03
Total length:			46:49
