= Breakfast in New Orleans, Dinner in Timbuktu =

Studio album by Bruce Cockburn
- Released: September 14, 1999
- Studios: Reaction Studios; The Gas Station and Pinhead Recorders; The Doghouse
- Genre: Folk rock
- Labels: True North (Canada); Rykodisc (United States)
- Producers: Bruce Cockburn; Colin Linden

Bruce Cockburn chronology
The Charity of Night (1997)	Breakfast in New Orleans, Dinner in Timbuktu (1999)	You've Never Seen Everything (2003)

Professional ratings
Review scores
Source	Rating
AllMusic	2.5/5 stars

Breakfast in New Orleans, Dinner in Timbuktu is an album by the Canadian musician Bruce Cockburn. The album was released in 1999 by True North Records in Canada and Rykodisc in the United States. It failed to chart in Cockburn's home country of Canada, becoming Cockburn's first album to earn this distinction.

In the United States, the album debuted at No. 39 on the Billboard Independent Albums chart and sold 75,000 copies as of 2001 according to Soundscan. The album also earned Cockburn a Juno Award for Best Roots & Traditional Album of the Year. "Last Night of the World" was released as the album's first single, which reached No. 28 on the Canadian adult contemporary charts and No. 9 the US Billboard Adult Alternative Airplay chart.

== Background ==
Breakfast in New Orleans, Dinner in Timbuku incorporates elements of folk, jazz, and world music, with the West African kora appearing on the songs "Mango", "Let The Bad Air Out", and "Use Me While You Can". Several songs, including the opening track "When You Give It Away" and "Use Me While You Can", which serves the album's closing track, feature the use of spoken word. "Down to the Delta" and "Deep Lake" are both instrumentals that feature the percussion playing of Rick Lazar, whom he credited with providing some of the album's "exotic elements."

"The Embers of Eden" is about being away from a loved one while "Use Me While You Can" evokes images of Mali, which Cockburn visited while working on a documentary on desertification called "River of Sand". During his time there, he was introduced to the kora by Toumani Diabaté. Cockburn decided to include the kora on Breakfast in New Orleans, Dinner in Timbuktu after hearing the instrument work in tandem with the guitar. He wrote "Mango" specifically with the kora in mind and got Daniel Janke to handle all kora parts on the album. Cockburn described "Look How Far" as a song about "a recurring frustration in my experience with people I feel close to and fond of."

Cockburn embarked on a tour to promote the album, with the European leg beginning on October 13, 1999, in Paris and concluding on November 15, 1999, in Pescara, Italy.

== Track listing ==
All songs written by Bruce Cockburn except as noted.

No.	Title	Writer(s)	Length
1.	"When You Give It Away"		4:53
2.	"Mango"		5:00
3.	"Last Night Of The World"		4:51
4.	"Isn't That What Friends Are For?"		5:21
5.	"Down To The Delta"		6:16
6.	"The Embers Of Eden"		5:39
7.	"Blueberry Hill"	Larry Stock, Al Lewis, Vincent Rose	4:58
8.	"Let The Bad Air Out"		5:49
9.	"Look How Far"		5:34
10.	"Deep Lake"		6:49
11.	"Use Me While You Can"		7:12

== Personnel ==
- Bruce Cockburn – guitars, vocals, handclaps
- Colin Linden – electric guitar (track 3)
- Daniel Janke – kora (tracks 2, 8–9)
- John Dymond – bass (tracks 1, 3, 7, 11)
- George Koller – bass (tracks 2, 4–5, 10), dilruba (track 10)
- Steve Lucas – bass (tracks 6, 8–9)
- Richard Bell – organ (tracks 1, 3, 7, 11)
- Janice Powers – keyboards (tracks 3–4, 6–7, 9)
- Gary Craig – drums (tracks 1, 3, 7, 11)
- Ben Riley – drums (tracks 2, 5–6, 8–9), cymbals (track 4)
- Rick Lazar – percussion (tracks 1–6, 8–10)
- Carlos del Junco – harmonica (tracks 1, 8–9)
- Stephen Donald – trombone (tracks 1, 8–9)
- Lucinda Williams – harmony vocals (tracks 1, 4, 9, 11)
- Margo Timmins – harmony vocals (track 2), duet vocals (track 7)
- Jonell Mosser – harmony vocals (tracks 3, 6)

== Chart performance ==
Chart (2000)	Peak position
US Independent Albums (Billboard)	39
