= Andy Milne =

Canadian jazz pianist (born 1969)

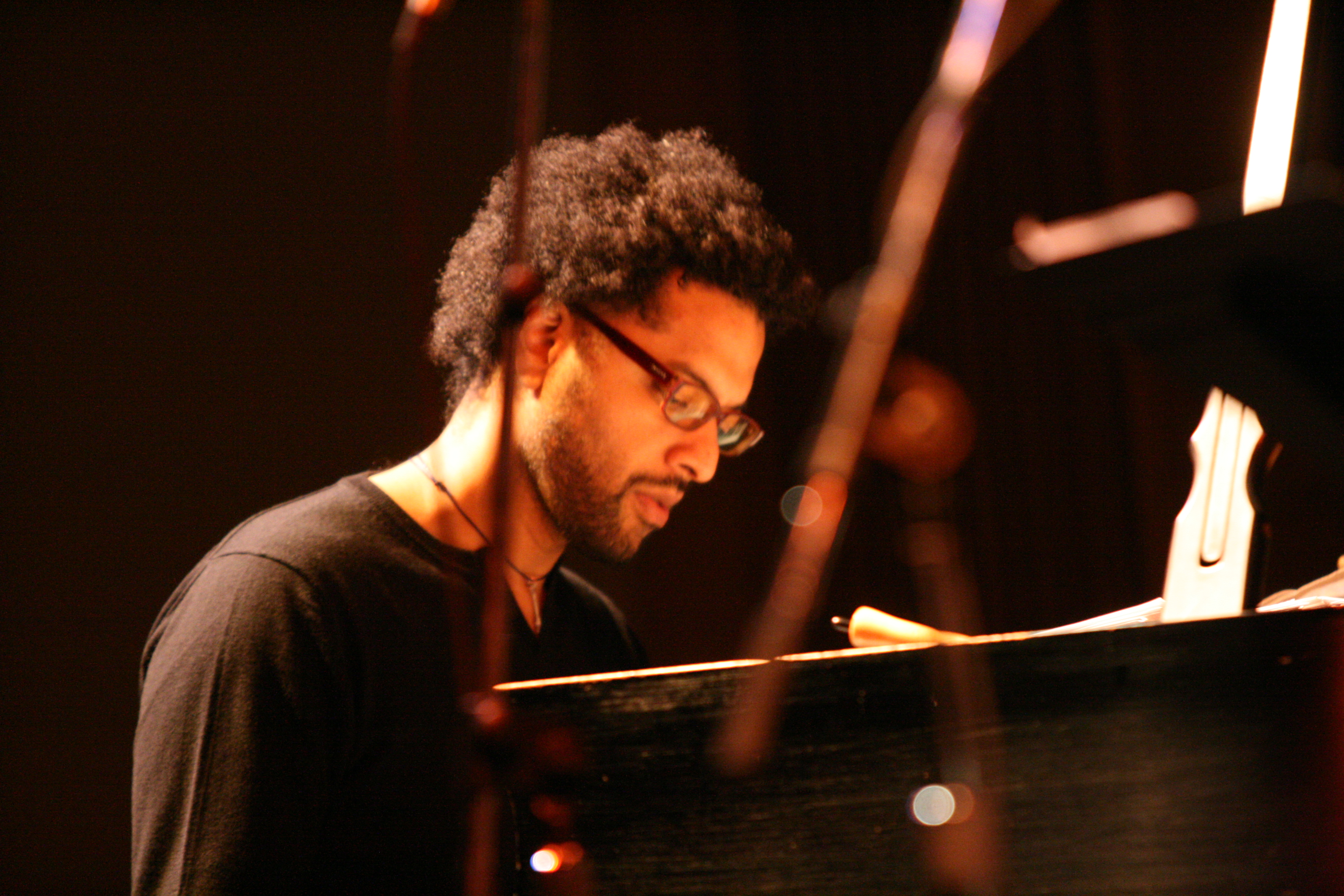

Background information
- Born: January 30, 1969 (age 57); Hamilton, Ontario, Canada
- Genres: Jazz
- Occupation: Musician
- Instrument: Piano
- Labels: Contrology, Songlines, ObliqSound, Whirlwind
- Website: www.andymilne.com

Andy Milne (born January 30, 1969) is a Canadian jazz pianist, who records and performs both as a solo artist and as the leader of the ensemble Dapp Theory. He was born in Hamilton, Ontario, and raised in Kincardine and Toronto. One of ten siblings, he studied music at York University, where he was a student of Oscar Peterson.

In 1990 Milne graduated and received a grant from the Canada Council to study at the Banff Centre for the Fine Arts. He met saxophonist Steve Coleman and later joined Coleman's band, Five Elements. In 1998, Milne formed the band Cosmic Dapp Theory.

He has toured and recorded with Ravi Coltrane, Grégoire Maret, Sean Rickman, and Ralph Alessi.

His 2018 album The Seasons of Being won the Juno Award for Jazz Album of the Year – Group at the Juno Awards of 2019.

== Awards and honors ==
- Voted Rising Star Keyboardist, Down Beat magazine, 2004
- New Works Commission grant and French-America Jazz Exchange grant, Chamber Music America, 2006

== Discography ==
| Year | Album | Artist | Label |
|---|---|---|---|
| 1997 | Forward to Get Back | Andy Milne | d'Note |
| 1999 | New Age of Aquarius | Andy Milne's Cosmic Dapp Theory | Contrology |
| 2003 | Y'All Just Don't Know | Dapp Theory | Concord |
| 2007 | Dreams & False Alarms | Andy Milne | SongLines |
| 2007 | Scenarios | Andy Milne & Grégoire Maret | ObliqSound |
| 2008 | Layers of Chance | Dapp Theory | Contrology/ObliqSound |
| 2009 | Where Is Pannonica? | Andy Milne & Benoît Delbecq | SongLines |
| 2012 | From the Bridge (O.S.T. for The Captains) | Andy Milne | Contrology |
| 2014 | Forward in All Directions | Dapp Theory | Contrology |
| 2018 | The Seasons of Being | Dapp Theory | Sunnyside |

With Ralph Alessi

- Look (Between the Lines, 2006)
- Cognitive Dissonance (CAM Jazz, 2010)
- Wiry Strong (Clean Feed, 2011)
- Imaginary Friends (ECM, 2019)

With Bruce Cockburn

- You've Never Seen Everything (True North/Rounder, 2003)

With Steve Coleman

- Drop Kick (Novus, 1992)
- The Tao of Mad Phat (Novus, 1993)
- A Tale of 3 Cities (Novus, 1994)
- Curves of Life (BMG France, 1995)
- Def Trance Beat (Modalities of Rhythm) (BMG France, 1995)
- Myths, Modes and Means (BMG France, 1995)
- The Way of the Cipher (BMG France, 1995)
- The Sign and the Seal (BMG France, 1996)
- Genesis / The Opening of the Way (BMG France/RCA Victor, 1997)
- Resistance Is Futile (Label Bleu, 2001)

With Ravi Coltrane

- From the Round Box (BMG France, 2000)
- Mad 6 (Eighty-Eight's/Columbia, 2002)

With Carla Cook

- It's All About Love (Maxjazz, 1999)

With Ranee Lee

- Jazz on Broadway (Justin Time, 1992)

With Hugh Marsh

- Hugmars (Cool Papa, 2007)

With M-Base Collective

- Anatomy of a Groove (DIW, 1992)

With Diederik Rijpstra

- The Living City (TryTone, 2013)

With Carlos Ward

- Set for 2 Dons – Vol. 1 (Peull, 1999)

With Jeremy Warren

- I Can Do All Things
