= Jacky Terrasson (album) =

Studio album by Jacky Terrasson
- Released: 1994
- Recorded: June–August 1994
- Studios: Clinton Studios, Power Station, NYC
- Genre: Jazz
- Length: 55:00
- Label: Blue Note
- Producer: Jacky Terrasson

Jacky Terrasson chronology
| Lover Man (1994) | Jacky Terrasson (1994) | Reach (1995) |

Professional ratings
Review scores
| Source | Rating |
|---|---|
| AllMusic | 4/5 stars |
| Entertainment Weekly | A |
| Los Angeles Times | 3.5/4 stars |
| The Penguin Guide to Jazz Recordings | 3/4 stars |
| The Rolling Stone Jazz & Blues Album Guide | 4/5 stars |
| The Virgin Encyclopedia of Jazz | 3/5 stars |

Jacky Terrasson is a studio album by French-American jazz pianist Jacky Terrasson released in 1994 by Blue Note label. This is his first full-size album as a leader. The release is a collection of jazz standards with four compositions written by Terrasson.

== Reception ==
Scott Yanow of AllMusic wrote, "Jacky Terrasson delights in turning standards inside out. It is fortunate that bassist Ugonna Okegwo and drummer Leon Parker are very alert (or perhaps well-rehearsed), because to the uninitiated listener these eccentric and rather quirky performances are often quite unpredictable and occasionally jarring. Well worth checking out." Entertainment Weekly review by David Hajdu commented, "Jacky Terrasson is a fiery display of untraditional ideas and virtuoso daring. Terrasson overcomes the no-win scenario of the standard repertoire by changing the rules." Don Heckman of Los Angeles Times added, "The act of performing a set of standards on a debut album is, at the very least, courageous and runs the risk of endless comparisons... A powerful maiden voyage for a performer who is going to be one of the important jazz voices of the ‘90s."

== Track listing ==
| No. | Title | Writer(s) | Length |
|---|---|---|---|
| 1. | "I Love Paris" | Cole Porter | 7:30 |
| 2. | "Just a Blues" | Terrasson | 3:42 |
| 3. | "My Funny Valentine" | Lorenz Hart, Richard Rodgers | 7:09 |
| 4. | "Hommage à Lili Boulanger" | Terrasson | 3:02 |
| 5. | "Bye Bye Blackbird" | Mort Dixon, Ray Henderson | 5:21 |
| 6. | "He Goes on a Trip" | Terrasson | 6:35 |
| 7. | "I Fall in Love Too Easily" | Sammy Cahn, Jule Styne | 3:24 |
| 8. | "Time After Time" | Sammy Cahn, Jule Styne | 6:45 |
| 9. | "For Once in My Life" | Ron Miller, Orlando Murden | 4:16 |
| 10. | "What a Difference a Day Made" | Stanley Adams, María Mendez Grever | 5:40 |
| 11. | "Cumba's Dance" | Terrasson | 1:36 |
| Total length: | | | 55:00 |

== Personnel ==
- Jacky Terrasson – piano
- Ugonna Okegwo – bass
- Leon Parker – drums
