= Reach (Jacky Terrasson album) =

Studio album by Jacky Terrasson
- Released: 1995
- Genre: Jazz
- Length: 47:38
- Label: Blue Note
- Producer: Jacky Terrasson

Jacky Terrasson chronology
Jacky Terrasson (1994)	Reach (1995)	Rendezvous (1997)

Professional ratings
Review scores
Source	Rating
AllMusic	4.5/5 stars
The Buffalo News	3.5/4 stars
Entertainment Weekly	A
Los Angeles Times	3.5/4 stars
The Rolling Stone Jazz & Blues Album Guide	3/5 stars
The Penguin Guide to Jazz Recordings	3/4 stars
Tom Hull	B+
The Virgin Encyclopedia of Jazz	4/5 stars

Reach is a studio album by German jazz pianist Jacky Terrasson released in 1995 by Blue Note label. This is his second album for Blue Note. The album is a collection of five originals written by Terrasson and three jazz standards.

== Reception ==
Scott Yanow of AllMusic stated, "The talented young pianist Jacky Terrasson and his trio (with bassist Ugonna Okegwo and drummer Leon Parker) find something new to say on a few standards ... and introduce five of Terrasson's originals. Although he has does not have an original style yet, Terrasson displays a great deal of potential for the future." David Hajdu of Entertainment Weekly commented, " If he continues fashioning musical constructions as resourceful and witty as Reach, he’ll be one jazz Xer to endure for generations." Geoffrey Himes of The Washington Post added, "There was an unmistakable glibness about his self-titled debut last year, but his new piano trio recording, "Reach," lives up to its title by stretching Terrasson's emotional range considerably. The new album has passages that are simply decorous or exhibitionist, but it also has many more moments in which the pianist captures the joy or the melancholy of the moment in his quicksilver phrases and rhythmic shifts." The Buffalo News review by Jeff Simon observed, "...Terrasson got roped into trying out a new recording process designed to maximize spontaneous interaction. As promising as the process may be, it seems to have distracted Terrasson a bit from the music itself."

== Track listing ==
No.	Title	Writer(s)	Length
1.	"I Should Care"	Sammy Cahn, Axel Stordahl, Paul Weston	5:28
2.	"The Rat Race"	Terrasson	3:16
3.	"Baby Plum"	Terrasson	5:18
4.	"(I Love You) For Sentimental Reasons"	William Best, Deek Watson	5:55
5.	"Reach / Smoke Gets in Your Eyes / Reach"	Terrasson	8:58
6.	"Happy Man"	Terrasson	8:25
7.	"First Affair"	Terrasson	5:58
8.	"Just One of Those Things"	Cole Porter	4:20
Total length:			47:38

== Personnel ==
- Jacky Terrasson – piano
- Ugonna Okegwo – bass
- Leon Parker – drums
