= Gouache (album) =

Studio album by Jacky Terrasson
- Released: September 3, 2012
- Recorded: May 10–18, 2012
- Studio: Studio Recall
- Genre: Jazz
- Length: 50:46
- Label: Universal
- Producer: Christophe Deghelt

Jacky Terrasson chronology
Push (2010)	Gouache (2012)	Take This (2015)

Gouache is a 2012 studio album by jazz pianist and composer Jacky Terrasson. The vocalist Cécile McLorin Salvant appears on two tracks. The album was released in Europe by Universal and in the U.S. by Sunnyside the following year.

== Reception ==
Professional ratings
Review scores
Source	Rating
Allmusic	4/5 stars
The Buffalo News	4/4 stars
Financial Times	3/5 stars
DownBeat	3/5 stars
Jazzwise	3/5 stars
PopMatters	8/10
Tom Hull	B+

Matt Collar reviewed the album for Allmusic and described it as "eclectic, playful, and often beautiful" highlighting the "ruminative version" of John Lennon's "Oh My Love" and the "positively swoon-inducing" "Je te veux" in which Cécile McLorin Salvant "draws upon the languid, bittersweet influence of Billie Holiday, while always keeping a smile in her voice". Collar concluded that "Terrasson's original compositions reveal a passion for melody and groove, paired with an adventurous, flowing, stream-of-consciousness post-bop aesthetic that ultimately makes Gouache a pure joy to hear". PopMatters 's review by Steve Horowitz observed, "Like the watercolor from which the song gets its name, the album’s musical palette is rich with colors and blendings. The surface beauty only deepens the expressiveness of Terrasson’s work."

Reviewing the album for JazzTimes, Thomas Conrad felt that Terrasson "...should be ready to make an important record, but Gouache is not one. It is more a sampler of party music than an album statement. Guests come and go. It is also Terrasson's most extended flirtation with pop culture". Conrad noted that the "prancing groove" of "Rehab" is "interrupted by ominous crashes" and highlighted trumpeter Stephane Belmondo's contribution on "Mother". Conrad felt that the pieces involving Terrasson's trio were best, describing "Happiness" as Terrasson's "sweet spot...a depiction of ecstasy through unleashed energy and spilling ideas" and that "C'est si bon"'s "wild headlong bouncing ride is quintessential Terrasson: entertaining, extravagant, skillful, more from the head than the heart".

Dave Gelly reviewed Gouache for The Guardian and wrote that Terrasson was "a pianist of such extravagant talents that it sometimes seems he can't decide what to do with them. There have been occasions when his phenomenal technique swamped everything else, but they are getting fewer as the years pass. He creates some truly touching and delicate moments here, in particular a version of Erik Satie's Je te veux, with vocalist Cécile McLorin Salvant, and a quietly disturbing treatment of Amy Winehouse's Rehab. The authentic Terrasson fireworks still get a good showing among these 10 pieces, though, especially in his own, aptly titled Try to Catch Me".

"Baby" was described by reviewers both as a "jaunty sleigh ride of song, with a euphoric '70s R&B ballad midsection" and as "vacuous a ditty as you've ever sat still for" that Terrasson "speeds...to a blur on acoustic piano and hammers it on Fender Rhodes. Harmless fun."

== Track listing ==
1. "Try to Catch Me" (Jacky Terrasson) – 4:07
2. "Baby" (Justin Bieber) – 3:22
3. "Je te veux" (Erik Satie, Henry Pacory) – 5:25
4. "Rehab" (Amy Winehouse) – 3:55
5. "Gouache" (Terrasson) – 5:20
6. "Oh My Love" (John Lennon) – 4:48
7. "Mother" (Terrasson) – 6:50
8. "Happiness" (Terrasson) – 7:42
9. "Valse Hot" (Sonny Rollins) – 4:06
10. "C'est si bon" (Henri Betti) – 6:05

== Personnel ==
- Jacky Terrasson – Fender Rhodes, piano
- Stephane Belmondo – flugelhorn, trumpet
- Michel Portal – bass clarinet
- Burniss Earl Travis II – bass guitar, double bass
- Justin Faulkner – drums, percussion
- Minino Garay – percussion
- Cécile McLorin Salvant – vocals

== Charts ==
Chart performance for Gouache
Chart (2012)	Peak position
French Albums (SNEP)	68
