= Rendezvous (Jacky Terrasson and Cassandra Wilson album) =

1997 studio album by Jacky Terrasson & Cassandra Wilson

Studio album by Jacky Terrasson and Cassandra Wilson
- Released: September 23, 1997
- Recorded: January 4–6, 19, and April 4, 1997
- Studios: Clinton Recording Studios (New York City, New York)
- Genres: Jazz, blues
- Length: 48:02
- Label: Blue Note 7243 8 55484 2 0
- Producer: Bob Belden

Jacky Terrasson chronology
Reach (1995)	Rendezvous (1997)	Alive (1998)

Cassandra Wilson chronology
New Moon Daughter (1995)	Rendezvous (1997)	Traveling Miles (1999)

Rendezvous is a collaborative studio album by American jazz singer Cassandra Wilson and jazz pianist Jacky Terrasson. The album was released on September 23, 1997, by Blue Note label. The album includes mostly jazz and pop standards with one track written by Terrasson. The album's title derives from a Herbie Hancock ballad.

== Recording ==
Recordings were made on January 4, 5, 6, and 19, and April 4, 1997, at Clinton Recording Studios in New York City. All the songs were arranged by Jacky Terrasson. The music material was recorded and mixed on analog recorder recorders (A800 and A880) without noise reduction; also no equalizers were used during mastering.

== Reception ==
Professional ratings
Review scores
Source	Rating
AllMusic	3/5 stars
The Buffalo News	4/4 stars
The Encyclopedia of Popular Music	3/5 stars
Los Angeles Times	3/4 stars
The Penguin Guide to Jazz Recordings	2.5/4 stars
The Rolling Stone Jazz & Blues Album Guide	4/5 stars
The Virgin Encyclopedia of Jazz	4/5 stars

Jonathan Tabak of OffBeat commented "Terrasson’s piano draws more blues out of Wilson’s voice than the electric guitar to which she’s accustomed. Here she sounds like a more fragile Nina Simone. She seems to be kissing each syllable goodbye with heart-rending tenderness, as though she doesn’t want to release her soul’s bounty until the last possible moment. Rendezvous reminds us that a thousand delicate whispers have greater romantic impact than a single shout". Adam Shatz of The New York Times called the release "a luckluster album of standards". Don Heckman of The Los Angeles Times stated "The mood throughout the album is dark and thoughtful. These are not interpretations that reach out to grab the listeners. But there are ample rewards for listeners willing to take the time to go with Terrasson's and Wilson's always mesmerizing readings".

Suzanne McElfresh of Vibe added: "Rendezvous is technically a collaboration, but this disc is an affair far more Jacky Terrasson's and Cassandra Wilson's." Bret Primack in his review for JazzTimes stated, "Wilson is simply brilliant, her deep, smoky voice caressing each note and syllable. When she chooses, she creates immense emotional tension, just by holding back. In just a few short years, Cassandra Wilson has become the voice of the era and certain to be a major force in the 21st century." The Buffalo News review by Jeff Simon noted, "this is a marvelous meeting of two of the freshest and most open-minded younger talents in jazz -- certainly the reigning specialists at radically revising great standards..."

== Track listing ==
No.	Title	Writer(s)	Length
1.	"Old Devil Moon"	Yip Harburg, Burton Lane	5:45
2.	"Chan's Song"	Herbie Hancock	5:44
3.	"Tennessee Waltz"	Pee Wee King, Redd Stewart	4:45
4.	"Little Boy Lost"	Alan Bergman, Michel Legrand	5:03
5.	"Autumn Leaves"	Joseph Kosma, Johnny Mercer, Jacques Prévert	2:03
6.	"It Might as Well Be Spring"	Oscar Hammerstein II, Richard Rodgers	4:55
7.	"My Ship"	Ira Gershwin, Kurt Weill	3:24
8.	"I Remember You"	Johnny Mercer, Victor Schertzinger	3:00
9.	"Tea for Two"	Irving Caesar, Vincent Youmans	4:45
10.	"If Ever I Would Leave You"	Alan Jay Lerner, Frederick Loewe	5:28
11.	"Chicago 1987"	Jacky Terrasson	3:10
Total length:			48:02

The Japanese release includes two additional tracks: "Come Rain or Come Shine" written by Johnny Mercer and Harold Arlen, and "Medieval Blues" by Mino Cinélu.

== Personnel ==
- Jacky Terrasson – acoustic piano (1, 2, 4–11), electric piano (3, 5), all arrangements
- Cassandra Wilson – vocals (1, 3–4, 6–10)
- Mino Cinelu – percussion (1–3, 6–10)
- Lonnie Plaxico – bass (1, 3, 6–10)
- Kenny Davis – bass (2)

== Production ==
- Bob Beiden – producer
- Jim Anderson – recording, mixing
- Greg Gasperino – assistant engineer
- Christina Schwartz – assistant engineer
- Joe Shatoff – assistant engineer
- Keith Shortreed – assistant engineer
- Mark Wilder – mastering at Sony Music Studios (New York, NY)
- Lynn Bagley – studio management
- Bob Parsons – music preparations
- P.R. Brown – package design
- William Claxton – portrait photography
- Paul E. Swanson – cover photography
- Dream Street Management – management

== Chart performance ==
Chart (1997)	Peak position
US Jazz Albums (Billboard)	10
