= Into the Blue (Jacky Terrasson and Emmanuel Pahud album) =

Studio album by Jacky Terrasson & Emmanuel Pahud
- Released: June 2003
- Recorded: August 2001
- Studios: Recall Studios, Mas De Quintanel, France
- Genre: Jazz
- Length: 45:51
- Label: Blue Note
- Producer: Stephen Johns

Jacky Terrasson chronology
| Smile (2002) | Into the Blue (2003) | Mirror (2007) |

Emmanuel Pahud chronology
| Flute Concertos (2003) | Into the Blue (2003) | Telemann Concertos (2003) |

Professional ratings
Review scores
| Source | Rating |
|---|---|
| AllMusic | 4/5 stars |
| The Virgin Encyclopedia of Jazz | 2/5 stars |

Into the Blue is a collaborative studio album by jazz pianist Jacky Terrasson and flautist Emmanuel Pahud. The album was released on June 2003 via Blue Note label. The album features jazz treatments of 14 classical melodies recorded in the south of France in late summer of 2001.

== Reception ==
Judith Schlesinger in her review for All About Jazz stated, "Into the Blue is a blue ribbon event. Emmanuel Pahud is a classical flutist. Jacky Terrassson is a jazz pianist known for his playful inventiveness. Into the Blue contains beauty and surprise and flashes of wit, which is typical of anything Terrasson does. Organically floating on the third stream, this one will appeal to both classical and jazz fans."

In 2003, the album was nominated for Grammy award as Best Classical Crossover Album.

== Personnel ==
- Jacky Terrasson – piano
- Emmanuel Pahud – flute
- Ali Jackson – drums
- Sean Smith – acoustic bass
