= Mirror (Jacky Terrasson album) =

Studio album by Jacky Terrasson
- Released: August 28, 2007
- Recorded: December 12–13, 2006
- Studios: Legacy Studios, NYC
- Genre: Jazz
- Length: 50:17
- Label: Blue Note
- Producer: Jacky Terrasson

Jacky Terrasson chronology
Into the Blue (2003)	Mirror (2007)	Push (2010)

Professional ratings
Review scores
Source	Rating
AllMusic	4.5/5 stars
All About Jazz	4.5/5 stars
CMJ New Music Monthly	🤘
PopMatters	6/10
Tom Hull	B
The Penguin Guide to Jazz Recordings	3/4 stars

Mirror is a studio album by French jazz pianist and composer Jacky Terrasson. Blue Note released the album on August 28, 2007. The album is a collection of his solo tracks: seven jazz standards and five originals.

== Reception ==
Thomas Conrad of JazzTimes stated, "It is easy to hear why Jacky Terrasson is often cited as an influence and inspiration by other young pianists. Track by track on Mirror, he postulates problems for himself, solves them brilliantly, and demonstrates what is pianistically possible if you have chops of doom." Ken Dryden of AllMusic observed, "Mirror provides a rare opportunity to enjoy Terrasson in a solo piano setting. He recasts the old favorite from the Duke Ellington songbook by mixing a different vamp, adding an ominous tremolo and even taking breaks to tap on the piano's wood surface, while never losing his focus on its theme and delivering a fresh, exciting interpretation."

All About Jazz review by Doug Collette commented, "Mirror is a thing of beauty. Terrasson has proven himself a courageously proficient jazz musician on his previous recordings, but this new project is a step above what he's done before. Many solo piano albums tend to be either too stark or too directionless, but Terrasson's is purposeful and deep with passion. There's a sense of spontaneity that comes and goes within his playing that contrasts beautifully with a more formal approach..." Will Layman of PopMatters added, "What Jacky Terrasson has always had is a delicate, striking touch at the piano and a gift for non-clichéd melodic invention. Playing solo, his spark is obvious on certain songs. But a solo set also opens Terrasson to proper critique. His ideas too often have a perversity about them."

== Track listing ==
No.	Title	Writer(s)	Length
1.	"Caravan"	Duke Ellington, Irving Mills, Juan Tizol	6:29
2.	"Juvenile"	Terrasson	6:33
3.	"Just a Gigolo"	Irving Caesar, Julius Brammer, Leonello Casucci	3:17
4.	"You've Got a Friend"	Carole King	6:36
5.	"Little Red Ribbon"	Terrasson	3:46
6.	"Tragic Mulotto Blues"	Terrasson	3:07
7.	"America the Beautiful"	Katharine Lee Bates, Samuel Ward	3:18
8.	"Bluesette"	Norman Gimbel, Toots Thielemans	3:44
9.	"Cherokee"	Ray Noble	3:26
10.	"Everything Happens to Me"	Matt Dennis, Tom Adair	6:35
11.	"Mirror"	Terrasson	3:31
12.	"Go Round"	Terrasson	2:29
Total length:			50:17

== Charts ==
Chart performance for Mirror
Chart (2007)	Peak position
French Albums (SNEP)	106
