= You've Never Seen Everything =

Studio album by Bruce Cockburn
- Released: 2003
- Recorded: October 7 – December 16, 2002
- Genre: Folk rock
- Length: 67:04
- Label: True North / Rounder
- Producers: Bruce Cockburn, Colin Linden

Bruce Cockburn chronology
Breakfast in New Orleans, Dinner in Timbuktu (1999)	You've Never Seen Everything (2003)	Speechless (2005)

You've Never Seen Everything is the 21st studio album by Canadian singer-songwriter Bruce Cockburn, released on July 10, 2003. It was his first studio album in four years, when Breakfast in New Orleans, Dinner in Timbuktu was released. In Canada, the album was released by True North Records, who arranged an agreement with Rounder Records to handle distribution in the United States.

Special guests on the album include Hugh Marsh, Jackson Browne, Emmylou Harris, Sarah Harmer, and Sam Phillips.

== Background ==
Following the conclusion of Cockburn's tour supporting his 1999 album Breakfast in New Orleans, Dinner in Timbuktu, he took a year-long break before assembling material for his next album. He worked with his former touring guitarist Colin Linden as a co-producer and recorded the album in facilities across Toronto, Montreal, Nashville, and Los Angeles. Cockburn originally encountered difficulties writing new material; he credited Andy Milne with ending his creative dry spell. The two had met 18 months prior to the release of You've Never Seen Everything at a show in New York. They first wrote "Everywhere Dance" before finishing off the song "Trickle Down" around a preexisting set of lyrics written by Cockburn.

On You've Never Seen Everything, Cockburn drew from influences of electronica, utilizing loops of violins, percussion, Indonesian Gamelan, and frogs recorded in Zambia by one of his friends. Speaking of his interest in electronica music, Cockburn noticed that the genre was akin to "a drone continuum with short-term events happening over top", which he likened to his approach on the guitar. He then decided to further embrace this technique by incorporating heavy repetition in his playing.

== Release ==
You've Never Seen Everything was first released in Canada, with True North Records handling distribution. They had reached an agreement with Rounder Records, a company based in Massachusetts in 2001 to handle the release of Cockburn's albums in the United States, having first done so with a reissue of his discography and the release of a career-spanning compilation album titled, Anything Anytime Anywhere: Singles 1979-2002. The song "Open" received airplay on US Adult album alternative radio stations prior to the album's release.

Cooking Vinyl released the album in the United Kingdom on June 2, 2003, which was followed by a US release on June 10, 2003, with Rounder Records handling its distribution in that country instead. According to a May 22, 2003 article published by Billboard, an agreement was made for Nippon Columbia and Shanghai Record Co. to release the album in Japan and China respectively.

Cockburn supported You've Never Seen Everything with a multi-leg tour scheduled from July 2, 2003 in North America to October 7, 2003 in Europe. He played several songs from the album, including "Trickle Down" and "All Our Dark Tomorrows", and the title track.

== Critical reception ==
Professional ratings
Review scores
Source	Rating
AllMusic	4.5/5 stars
Rolling Stone	3/5 stars
USA Today	3/4 stars
The Weekend Australian	4 stars

In a review for AllMusic, critic Thom Jurek wrote: "Of his many gifts, two of his most developed are his journalistic eye for detail, and having one ear always to the ground. This time out, the view is sharply contrasting from one song to the next. Politically, this is Cockburn's angriest record since World of Wonders or Stealing Fire... It is pointless to place this record in a pecking order with Cockburn's other work; that it adds to that body of work immeasurably is compliment enough. However, to say that it is necessary because it can cause self- and world-examination in any listener who plays it through is as high a compliment as can be offered."

Geoff Ashmun of PopMatters called the album "spellbinding" and noted "Cockburn's as present and relevant as he's ever been better." In a review for The Weekend Australian, Ian Cuthbertson described that it "takes off on a fascinating journey of witnessing and protest, prayer and despair, imagery and ambience", and praised it as "so fresh and inspired it's hard to believe it's his 27th". Brian Mansfield of USA Today wrote that You've Never Seen Everything "continually links the notions" of "unimaginable evil and unfathomable love."

== Track listing ==
All tracks are written by Bruce Cockburn, except where noted.

Track listing
No.	Title	Length
1.	"Tried and Tested"	5:03
2.	"Open"	4:03
3.	"All Our Dark Tomorrows"	6:17
4.	"Trickle Down" (Cockburn, Andy Milne, Carl Walker)	6:16
5.	"Everywhere Dance" (Cockburn, Milne)	4:20
6.	"Put It in Your Heart"	5:27
7.	"Postcards from Cambodia"	6:57
8.	"Wait No More"	4:09
9.	"Celestial Horses"	5:59
10.	"You've Never Seen Everything"	9:16
11.	"Don't Forget About Delight"	5:49
12.	"Messenger Wind"	3:28
Total length:		67:04

== Personnel ==
- Bruce Cockburn – vocals, acoustic and electric guitars, dobro (track 8)
- Hugh Marsh – violins (except 5), loops (1, 3), keyboard, percussion (7)
- Andy Milne – piano (4, 5, 10)
- Grégoire Maret – harmonica (5)
- Colin Linden – electric mandolins (2), additional bass (7)
- John Dymond – bass (1–3, 6)
- Richard Brown – bass (4)
- Steve Lucas – bass (7, 11)
- Larry Taylor – upright bass (8, 9, 12)
- Gary Craig – drums and percussion (exc. 5, 7, 11)
- Ben Riley – drums (4, 7, 11), additional drums (1, 3)
- Stephen Hodges – drums and percussion (8, 9, 10), marimba (12)
- Dr. Divorce – loop (10)
- John Whynot – human whistle (10)
- Sam Phillips – vocal harmonies (1)
- Sarah Harmer – vocal harmonies (2, 11)
- Emmylou Harris – vocal harmonies (3, 7, 10)
- Maury LaFoy – vocal harmonies (6)
- Graham Powell – vocal harmonies (6)
- Jonell Mosser – vocal harmonies (8)
- Jackson Browne – vocal harmonies (9)

Production

- Bruce Cockburn – producer
- Colin Linden – producer, additional recording
- John Whynot audio engineer at
  - Studio Frisson, Montreal
  - The Clubhouse, Toronto
  - Deep Field, Nashville
  - Groove Masters, Los Angeles
  - Devonshire, Los Angeles
- John Whynot – mixing at Skip Saylor Sound, Los Angeles
- Greg Calbi – mastering at Sterling Sound, New York
