= First Insight =

Studio album by Jesse Davis
- Released: 1998
- Recorded: September 1997
- Genre: Jazz
- Label: Concord Jazz
- Producer: John Burk

Jesse Davis chronology
From Within (1996)	First Insight (1998)	The Set-Up (2002)

First Insight is an album by the American saxophonist Jesse Davis, released in 1998. It was his sixth album for Concord Jazz. Davis supported it with a North American tour.

== Production ==
Davis composed all of the album's songs; he tried to reflect on what made his sound unique. He was chiefly influenced by the playing of Sonny Stitt and Charlie Parker. Davis was backed by Mulgrew Miller on piano, Ron Carter on bass, Peter Bernstein on guitar, and Kenny Washington on drums. The title track was influenced by the book The Celestine Prophecy. "Nola" was written as a tribute to Davis's hometown. "Midnight Blue" is an homage to Thelonious Monk. "B.Y.O.G." is played in 7/4 time. Davis sang on "A Funny Thing".

== Critical reception ==
Professional ratings
Review scores
Source	Rating
AllMusic	3/5 stars
DownBeat	3/5 stars
The Guardian	3/5 stars
The Penguin Guide to Jazz on CD	3/4 stars
The Philadelphia Inquirer	3/4 stars

The Chicago Tribune said, "Though the man's searing, blues-drenched playing alone would recommend First Insight, the stylistic variety of the compositions and the ingenuity of Davis's arrangements make this recording a tour de force." The Hartford Courant noted that the "zesty compositional variety accentuates the session's soloing strengths." The Washington Post compared Davis to Cannonball Adderley and concluded that "no one is carrying on [his] legacy more effectively today than [Davis]... His new album is filled with the pleasures of swinging, robust blues." LA Weekly opined that Davis "can play circles around" James Carter, Joshua Redman, and "some of the Marsalis cronies".

Jazziz stated, "Davis's alto sound—at turns throaty and reedy then pure and clean—and the narratives of his nine fine compositions on the new disc are the work of a man not just conversant, but capable of meaningful dialogue." The Irish Times said that Davis's "playing, though derivative, has reached a depth and inventiveness beyond anything he has previously recorded". The Toronto Star admired the "keen, resourceful awareness of melody and spare phrasing." The Guardian noted that, "unlike many contemporaries thrust into the leadership role, [Davis] invents tunes that are rather more than exercises."

== Track listing ==
No.	Title	Length
1.	"First Insight"
2.	"Nola"
3.	"A Little R & R"
4.	"B.Y.O.G."
5.	"Midnight Blue"
6.	"J's Idea"
7.	"A Funny Thing"
8.	"Jetlagged"
9.	"Donkey Stomp"
