= Alive (Jacky Terrasson album) =

Live album by Jacky Terrasson
- Released: May 1998
- Recorded: June 14, 1997
- Venues: Iridium Jazz Club, NYC
- Genre: Jazz
- Length: 60:30
- Label: Blue Note
- Producer: Jacky Terrasson

Jacky Terrasson chronology
Rendezvous (1997)	Alive (1998)	What It Is (1999)

Professional ratings
Review scores
Source	Rating
AllMusic	3/5 stars
The Buffalo News	3.5/4 stars
The Rolling Stone Jazz & Blues Album Guide	3.5/5 stars
The Penguin Guide to Jazz Recordings	3/4 stars
The Virgin Encyclopedia of Jazz	3/5 stars

Alive is a live album by French jazz pianist Jacky Terrasson recorded on 14 June 1997 in the Iridium Jazz Club and released on 5 May 1998 by Blue Note label.

== Reception ==
Scott Yanow of AllMusic commented, "This is a very subtle date with the musicians utilizing dynamics and a lot of space (a little reminiscent in spots of Ahmad Jamal's Trio). Pianist Jacky Terrasson is so laidback in spots that it is almost as if he does not want to be recognized as the group's leader." Jeff Simon of The Buffalo News stated, "Terrasson is the other great young original in current jazz besides Carter, and at long last he has returned to the form of his great debut trio record... Yes, his use of space is pure Ahmad Jamal but no young musician in jazz -- not even Carter -- is as unpredictable as Terrasson in this trio with drummer Leon Parker and bassist Ugonna Okegwo." Neil Tesser of Chicago Reader added, "the new disc, Alive, features greater depth and more intrigue than the rest of his oeuvre put together. In his love of lapidary melody and romantic phrasing, the 32-year-old Terrasson combines the influence of Keith Jarrett with an update of Ahmad Jamal's spare constraint..."

== Track listing ==
No.	Title	Writer(s)	Length
1.	"Things Ain't What They Used to Be"	Mercer Ellington, Ted Persons	6:41
2.	"Cumba's Dance"	Terrasson	4:21
3.	"Sister Cheryl"	Tony Williams	9:05
4.	"Simple Things"	Terrasson	6:28
5.	"Nature Boy"	Eden Ahbez	8:40
6.	"Love for Sale"	Cole Porter	9:37
7.	"Fog Taking Over Noe Valley"	Terrasson	7:23
8.	"The Theme"	Miles Davis	2:38
9.	"There's No Disappointment in Heaven"	Traditional	5:37
Total length:			60:30

== Personnel ==
- Jacky Terrasson – piano
- Ugonna Okegwo – bass
- Leon Parker – drums
