= Young at Art =

Studio album by Jesse Davis
- Released: 1993
- Recorded: March 24–25, 1993
- Genre: Jazz
- Label: Concord
- Producer: Allen Farnham, Carl E. Jefferson

Jesse Davis chronology
As We Speak (1992)	Young at Art (1993)	High Standards (1994)

Young at Art is a studio album by jazz alto saxophonist Jesse Davis.

== Music and recording ==
On "East of the Sun", Davis begins with a solo that stays close to the lyric, then there is a solo by guitarist Peter Bernstein. "Brother Roj" is a medium-tempo waltz that is "dedicated to Davis' older brother, Roger, who brought Jesse his first alto sax".

== Critical reception ==
Professional ratings
Review scores
Source	Rating
AllMusic	4/5 stars
The Penguin Guide to Jazz	3/4 stars

The AllMusic reviewer wrote that the album is "a fine example of high-quality bebop played by some promising young players", comparing Davis with Cannonball Adderley. The Skanner's reviewer, commenting on Davis, wrote that "I feel he hasn't allowed himself to fully reach his current limits. I hope his next release will hear him loosen the ties to the past and step forward in time".

== Track listing ==
All tracks composed by Jesse Davis; except where indicated

1. "East of the Sun" (Brooks Bowman) – 5:34
2. "Brother Roj" – 7:26
3. "I Love Paris" (Cole Porter) – 9:33
4. "Ask Me Now" (Thelonious Monk) – 5:30
5. "Georgiana" – 5:50
6. "Waltz for Andre" – 7:02
7. "Little Flowers" – 5:54
8. "One for Cannon" – 6:01
9. "Tipsy" – 7:27
10. "Fine and Dandy" (Kay Swift, Paul James) – 4:32

== Personnel ==
- Jesse Davis – alto saxophone
- Brad Mehldau – piano
- Peter Bernstein – guitar
- Dwayne Burno – bass
- Leon Parker – drums
- Ted Klum – alto saxophone (track 8)
