= Smile (Jacky Terrasson album) =

Studio album by Jacky Terrasson
- Released: 2002
- Recorded: June 12–21, 2002
- Studios: Studio Recall, Pompignan, Tarn-et-Garonne, France
- Genre: Jazz
- Length: 47:10
- Label: Blue Note
- Producers: Christophe Deghelt, Jacky Terrasson

Jacky Terrasson chronology
Kindred (2001)	Smile (2002)	Into the Blue (2003)

Professional ratings
Review scores
Source	Rating
AllMusic	4/5 stars
laut.de	5/5 stars
The Penguin Guide to Jazz Recordings	2.5/4 stars
The Virgin Encyclopedia of Jazz	3/5 stars

Smile is a studio album by jazz pianist and composer Jacky Terrasson. Blue Note released the album in 2002. The album is named after the Charlie Chaplin's song "Smile", for which Terrasson arranged an elaborate variation. The album contains 10 tracks: nine jazz and pop standards and one original by Terrasson.

== Reception ==
Thomas Conrad of JazzTimes stated, "Terrasson is most disappointing when he takes on material with a rich history of interpretation in the recorded jazz canon... For Terrasson, it is just any little line to start him off and throw him into another fleet, polished display of his undeniable skill." Judith Schlesinger of AllMusic wrote, "Terrasson has been called "flamboyant," but this overlooks the sensitivity in his playing. While he's known for being adventurous, he's no showoff: his respect for the music and the listener is always evident. Two more things are certain: Terrasson sounds like nobody else, and this CD is full of surprise and delight."

Mark F. Turner of All About Jazz commented, "The stream of imaginative energy flows strong and true on Jacky Terrasson’s new recording, simply entitled Smile. The dazzling jazz pianist performs with panache and exuberance, adding his unique touch to a diverse mixture of contemporary and classic standards. The music remains true to Terrasson’s form, as it is somewhat of a return to the trio format of his early acclaimed recordings." Geoffrey Himes of The Washington Post added, "As on the previous disc, Terrasson again records in France and again includes tunes with some connection to the town he grew up in, Paris, whether it be "Autumn Leaves" or "Parisian Thoroughfare." Not surprisingly, he sounds more like himself on his own turf."

== Track listing ==
No.	Title	Writer(s)	Length
1.	"Parisian Thoroughfare"	Bud Powell	5:06
2.	"Mo Better Blues"	Bill Lee	2:37
3.	"Smile"	Charlie Chaplin, Geoffrey Parsons, John Turner	6:53
4.	"Sous le ciel de Paris"	Hubert Giraud, Jean Drejac	4:02
5.	"Isn't She Lovely?"	Stevie Wonder	3:00
6.	"The Dolphin"	Luiz Eça	6:03
7.	"Nardis"	Miles Davis	5:42
8.	"Autumn Leaves"	Joseph Kosma, Johnny Mercer, Jacques Prévert	3:29
9.	"My Funny Valentine"	Lorenz Hart, Richard Rodgers	3:13
10.	"59"	Jacky Terrasson	6:44
11.	"Le Jardin D'hiver"	Henri Salvador	4:42
12.	"L'éducation Sentimentale"	Maxime le Forestier	2:39
13.	"L'air de riem"		6:33
Total length:			47:10

== Personnel ==
- Jacky Terrasson – piano
- Eric Harland – drums
- Sean Smith – acoustic bass
- Rémi Vignolo – electric bass (tracks 2, 4–5)

== Charts ==
Chart performance for Smile
Chart (2002)	Peak position
French Albums (SNEP)	97
