= A Paris... =

Studio album by Jacky Terrasson
- Released: 2000
- Studios: Recall Studio, Pompignan, Tarn-et-Garonne, France
- Genre: Jazz
- Length: 56:01
- Label: Blue Note
- Producers: Christophe Deghelt, Jacky Terrasson

Jacky Terrasson chronology
What It Is (1999)	A Paris... (2000)	Kindred (2001)

Professional ratings
Review scores
Source	Rating
AllMusic	4/5 stars
The Penguin Guide to Jazz Recordings	3/4 stars
The Virgin Encyclopedia of Jazz	4/5 stars

A Paris... is a studio album by jazz pianist and composer Jacky Terrasson recorded in France and released on 27 February 2000 by Blue Note label. This album is dedicated to the City of Lights—Paris—and all of France. The album contains a collection of jazz adaptations of the most famous French chanson tunes.

== Reception ==
John Murph of JazzTimes wrote, "Recorded in France and featuring both French jazz artists and French compositions, you’d expect pianist-composer Jacky Terrasson’s homage to his hometown to be more exuberant. Instead, the wistful, lyrical A Paris sounds like a yearning mediation on the City of Lights rather than a celebration." David R. Adler of AllMusic commented, "Several rather short pieces are grouped right around the middle of the album, giving that part of the program a collage-like feel that can seem a bit superficial. That aside, Terrasson has pulled off something rare: a concept album that succeeds on a variety of creative levels. In the process, he's given exposure to several excellent European musicians, not to mention some beautiful French music that American audiences ought to hear." Vincenzo Martorella of PopMatters added, "With his beautiful, and singable, melodies, nice arrangements and very cool playing, A Paris stands as Terrasson's masterwork."

== Track listing ==
No.	Title	Writer(s)	Length
1.	"Plaisir d'amour"	Jean-Paul-Égide Martini	3:08
2.	"Les chemins de l'amour"	Francis Poulenc	4:21
3.	"Jeux interdits"	Narciso Yepes	6:25
4.	"A Paris"	Francis Lemarque	8:49
5.	"I Love Paris in the Springtime"	Cole Porter	3:07
6.	"Que reste-t'il de nos amours?"	Charles Trénet	4:17
7.	"Ne me quitte pas"	Jacques Brel	4:41
8.	"La Vie en rose"	Louis Guglielmi	3:08
9.	"Nantes"	Monique Andrée Serf	1:59
10.	"La Marsellaise"	Rouget de Lisle	3:14
11.	"Rue des Lombards"	Terreon Gully, Jacky Terrasson, Rémi Vignolo	1:05
12.	"L'Aigle noir"	Monique Andrée Serf	3:20
13.	"I Love You More"	Terrasson	6:19
14.	"Métro"	Terrasson	1:30
Total length:			56:01

== Personnel ==
- Jacky Terrasson – piano
- Stefano Di Battista – sax
- Grégoire Maret – harmonica
- Stefon Harris – marimba
- Biréli Lagrène – guitar
- Ugonna Okegwo – bass
- Remi Vignolo – bass
- Terreon Gully – drums
- Leon Parker – drums, vocals (track 14)
- Minino Garay – percussion, vocals (track 14)

== Charts ==
Chart performance for A Paris...
Chart (2000)	Peak position
French Albums (SNEP)	109
