= Kindred (Jacky Terrasson and Stefon Harris album) =

Studio album by Jacky Terrasson & Stefon Harris
- Released: 2001
- Recorded: January 10–11, 2001
- Studios: Avatar (New York, New York)
- Genre: Jazz
- Length: 62:45
- Label: Blue Note 7243 5 31868 2 1
- Producers: Jacky Terrasson, Stefon Harris

Jacky Terrasson chronology
A Paris... (2000)	Kindred (2001)	Smile (2002)

Stefon Harris chronology
Black Action Figure (1999)	Kindred (2001)	The Grand Unification Theory (2003)

Professional ratings
Review scores
Source	Rating
The Encyclopedia of Popular Music	3/5 stars
The Penguin Guide to Jazz Recordings	3/4 stars

Kindred is a collaborative studio album by jazz pianist Jacky Terrasson and jazz vibraphonist Stefon Harris. The album was released in 2001, by Blue Note label. The album was nominated for Grammy Award as Best Jazz Instrumental Album.

== Reception ==
John Murph of JazzTimes stated, "If Terrasson’s playing seemed a bit drowned out by A Paris’ arching conception, he takes no prisoners on this speedball of a CD. With Harris’ impeccable timing, pianistic ideas and love for high-speed chase, Terrasson has to turn it up a notch or two, and he does so to great effect." Matt Cibula of PopMatters noted, "These two young jazz stars... have worked hard to produce this brainy and beautiful record and have redefined the notion of jazz collaboration. I'm hoping that they hook up like this every few years to craft a series of co-led albums; they are capable of producing a series that will last longer than they do." All About Jazz review by Jim Santella commented, " Cascades from vibes and piano embellish its beautiful melody without venturing too far from the norm. Throughout their recommended collaboration, Harris and Terrasson honor the tradition of jazz without recycling it. Their creative spirit brings a promise of growth in the new year."

== Track listing ==
No.	Title	Writer(s)	Length
1.	"My Foolish Heart"	Ned Washington, Victor Young	3:18
2.	"Tank's Tune"	Charlie Henderson	5:54
3.	"Summertime"	George Gershwin, Ira Gershwin, DuBose Heyward	7:06
4.	"Deja"		5:08
5.	"What Is This Thing Called Love?"	Cole Porter	2:49
6.	"Titi Boom"		4:43
7.	"John's Abbey"	Bud Powell	4:05
8.	"Never Let Me Go"	Jerry Livingston	6:24
9.	"Rat Entrance"	Terrasson	1:28
10.	"Rat Race"	Terrasson	5:50
11.	"Shane"	Harris	6:01
12.	"Little Niles"	Randy Weston	4:59
13.	"Body and Soul"	Frank Eyton, Johnny Green, Edward Heyman, Robert Sour	6:08
Total length:			62:45

== Personnel ==
- Jacky Terrasson – piano
- Stefon Harris – vibraphone, marimba
- Tarus Mateen – bass (tracks 1–4, 6–8, 10)
- Idris Muhammad – drums (tracks 1, 8)
- Terreon Gully – drums (tracks 2–4, 6–7, 10)
