= Push (Jacky Terrasson album) =

Studio album by Jacky Terrasson
- Released: April 27, 2010
- Recorded: September 28–30, 2009
- Studios: Sear Sound, New York City
- Genre: Jazz
- Length: 56:40
- Label: Concord Jazz
- Producer: Jacky Terrasson

Jacky Terrasson chronology
Mirror (2007)	Push (2010)	Gouache (2012)

Professional ratings
Review scores
Source	Rating
AllMusic	4/5 stars
All About Jazz	4.5/5 stars
Evening Standard	4/5 stars
Financial Times	4/5 stars
Glide Magazine	4/10
The Guardian	4/5 stars
Jazz Forum	4/5 stars
The List	3/5 stars
Tom Hull	B+

Push is a studio album by German jazz pianist and composer Jacky Terrasson. Concord Jazz released the album on April 27, 2010. This is his debut release for Concord and eleventh overall. Push also marks his vocal debut.

== Reception ==
Phil Johnson of The Independent wrote, "You can read the jazz recession into Terrasson's slight slip down the rankings in recent years, and the trying-too-hard-to-please-ness of this partial recovery with an augmented trio... There's no doubting his talent, but you can't please everyone, especially in jazz." John Fordham of The Guardian stated, "this set feels warmer, more musical and more mindful of its materials than previous outings, as well as emitting bursts of headlong energy that make you whoop." Raul D'Gama Rose of All About Jazz mentioned, "Push, then, is absolutely classic Terrasson. It is full of double entendre, unbridled ideation and luminosity. Like Monk, his muse, Terrasson's solos are abstruse. This is because his purported approach is never linear, but is instead curved—and if he can get away with it, inside out. He attacks melodies askance, sometimes taking cues for his solo excursions from the third or fourth line in a verse." Added Nate Chinen of The New York Times, "His brightly energetic, pristinely articulated pianism is the album’s crux."

== Track listing ==
No.	Title	Writer(s)	Length
1.	"Gaux Girl"	Terrasson	5:12
2.	"Beat It / Body and Soul"	Frank Eyton, Johnny Green, Edward Heyman, Michael Jackson, Robert Sour	5:58
3.	"Ruby, My Dear"	Thelonious Monk	7:37
4.	"Beat Bop"	Terrasson	3:35
5.	"Round Midnight"	Bernie Hanighen, Thelonious Monk, Cootie Williams	6:20
6.	"Morning"	Terrasson	4:07
7.	"My Church"	Terrasson	6:59
8.	"Say Yeah"	Terrasson	4:11
9.	"You'd Be So Nice to Come Home To"	Cole Porter	3:23
10.	"Carry Me Away"	Terrasson	3:12
11.	"O Café, O Soleil"	Terrasson	5:46
Total length:			56:40

== Personnel ==
- Jacky Terrasson – piano, keyboards, vocals (tracks 8, 11)
- Ben Williams – acoustic bass, electric bass
- Jamire Williams – drums
- Gregoire Maret – harmonica (tracks 3, 8)
- Cyro Baptista – percussion (tracks 8, 10–11)
- Jacques Schwarz-Bart – tenor saxophone (track 6)
- Matthew Stevens – guitar (track 8)

== Charts ==
Chart performance for Push
Chart (2010)	Peak position
French Albums (SNEP)	158
