= What It Is (Jacky Terrasson album) =

Studio album by Jacky Terrasson
- Released: May 1999
- Recorded: November 16–18 & 27, 1998
- Venues: Avatar (New York, New York)
- Genre: Jazz
- Length: 53:56
- Label: Blue Note
- Producer: Mino Cinelu

Jacky Terrasson chronology
Alive (1998)	What It Is (1999)	A Paris... (2000)

Professional ratings
Review scores
Source	Rating
AllMusic	4/5 stars
The Penguin Guide to Jazz Recordings	3/4 stars
The Virgin Encyclopedia of Jazz	3/5 stars

What It Is is a studio album by jazz pianist Jacky Terrasson released on May 18, 1999 by Blue Note label. Terrasson plays on a Steinway piano.

== Reception ==
Phil Gallo of Variety stated, "Terrasson’s fourth album as a leader, “What It Is” on Blue Note, finds the much-heralded French-American pianist tackling soulful numbers and works composed for an assortment of instrumentalists... His adventurousness deserves kudos — but this band’s execution needs work." Scott Yanow of AllMusic wrote, "This set is a bit of a departure for pianist Jacky Terrasson who has generally been heard in acoustic trio formats... Overall, this set is open to the influences of world music and more funk-oriented jazz, yet Jacky Terrasson still sounds quite creative, explorative and individual. An intriguing program." Geoffrey Himes of The Washington Post added, "the Parisian pianist has often been a prisoner of his own virtuosity, compelled to prove how many notes he could play in a chorus rather than how much emotion. By concentrating on more obvious melodies and by experimenting with different arrangements, Terrasson has broken out of that prison and expressed himself as never before."

== Track listing ==
All tracks are written by Jacky Terrasson except track 6 written by Roger Waters and track 9 written by Maurice Ravel.

No.	Title	Length
1.	"Sam's Song"	7:26
2.	"What's Wrong"	5:58
3.	"Little Red Ribbon"	5:18
4.	"Better World"	3:00
5.	"Toot Tune"	6:31
6.	"Money"	4:44
7.	"Le Roi Basil"	8:35
8.	"Baby Plum"	5:48
9.	"Boléro"	6:36
Total length:		53:56

== Personnel ==
- Jacky Terrasson – acoustic piano
- Rick Centalonza – flute, oboe
- Adam Rogers – guitar
- Fernando Saunders – electric bass
- Mino Cinelu – drums, percussion
- Ugonna Okegwo – acoustic bass
- Jaz Sawyer – drums
- Richard Bona – electric bass
- Jay Collins – flute
- Gregoire Maret – harmonica
- Michael Brecker – tenor saxophone
- Xiomara Laugarts – vocals
