= Franck Amsallem =

- Born: 25 October 1961 (age 64); Oran, French Algeria
- Genre: Jazz
- Occupations: Composer, bandleader, musician
- Instruments: Piano, vocals
- Years active: 1976–present
- Labels: Sunnyside, Naïve, Nocturne, jazz&people,
- Website: www.amsallem.com

Franck Amsallem is a French-American jazz pianist, arranger, composer, singer and educator. He was born in 1961 in Oran, French Algeria, but grew up in Nice, France.

== Early years ==
Amsallem was born in Oran (Algeria) to Elie Amsallem (1922-2019) and Sylviane Cohen Amsallem (1929-2022). He started learning the piano at age 7 and also took up the classical saxophone at the local conservatory. Early in his studies he was able to hear on stage such artists as Thad Jones, Count Basie, Charles Mingus, Bill Evans, Sonny Stitt and Stan Getz live at the Nice Jazz Festival, who all had a profound impact on his future. Amsallem started gigging in 1976 at the age of fourteen, and by high school was playing in dance bands throughout the Cote d'Azur and featured in the INA documentary La Leçon de Musique as a student of John Lewis. He was then awarded a full scholarship to attend the Berklee College of Music in 1981-84, to study composition and arranging with Herb Pomeroy and Michael Gibbs.

== New York City ==
After Boston, Amsallem moved to New York City in 1986 to earn a Masters in Jazz composition at the Manhattan School of Music. He went on to study with Bob Brookmeyer from 1986 to 1990, all the while continuing his classical piano studies with Phillip Kawin. Amsallem has augmented his formal education by participating in the BMI Jazz Composers' Workshop under the direction of Manny Albam & Bob Brookmeyer. He then played or collaborated with Gerry Mulligan, Joe Chambers, Gary Peacock, Bill Stewart, Joshua Redman, Maria Schneider, Jerry Bergonzi, Charles Lloyd, Bobby Watson, Roy Hargrove, Kevin Mahogany, Ravi Coltrane, Bob Brookmeyer, Bob Belden, Sonny Fortune, Tim Ries, Gary Bartz, Rick Margitza, Joe Roccisano, Blood, Sweat & Tears, and Harry Belafonte.

In 1987, Amsallem played a weeklong duo session with bassist Jay Leonhart at the Knickerbocker Saloon, New York. In 1989, Amsallem's composition "Obstinated" was performed by the Mel Lewis Jazz Orchestra, now known as the Vanguard Jazz Orchestra. His 1990 recording debut, "Out a Day", featuring Gary Peacock on bass and Bill Stewart on drums, was recorded at the famed Clinton Recording Studios in Manhattan. The album was very well received by the international jazz press and highly praised by the Penguin Guide to Jazz Recordings, which gave it its maximum rating (four stars).[3] He has since written, conducted and recorded big band music for the Köln Radio Jazz Orchestra (WDR), the Orchestre National de Jazz (ONJ) (France), chamber cross-over music for the Prism Saxophone Quartet, Chicago's chamber ensemble Fulcrum Point, and cross-over symphonic pieces as well as big band music for the Mancini Institute. His composition Nuits for String Orchestra and Jazz Quartet has been performed in various soloists including Bireli Lagrene, Philip Catherine, François Theberge & Don Menza. He has taught or given workshops at Roosevelt University, New York's 92Y, Paris' CNSM, CRR, the Royal conservatory in Den Haag, and in many other countries. To date, he has recorded 11 albums as a leader.

Amsallem has received several awards, including a 1989 Composition Fellowship from the National Endowment for the Arts, the 1989 Fondation de la Vocation Award from France, the 1991 ASCAP award for Young composers, the second prize at the 1992 Jacksonville Jazz Piano Competition, and the 2010 FAJE Award (French American Jazz Exchange). Amsallem's compositions are included in the Real Book Vol. III and in the European Real Book. Touring with his group and as a sideman launched him into the major jazz music scene, and he has played at the North Sea Jazz Festival, Pori, Molde, Paris, Antibes Juan-les-Pins, Nice Jazz festival, etc.

== Paris ==
Amsallem returned to France in 2001, settling in Paris, where he has collaborated or recorded with local greats Stephane Belmondo, Elisabeth Kontomanou, and Sara Lazarus.

In 2009 he released his first solo piano album, "Amsallem Sings" featuring himself on vocals.

He was invited to conduct and compose for the WDR Big Band in 2011.

He has performed all around the world (United States, the Netherlands, Israel, Algeria, China, South Africa, Portugal, South and Central America, Vietnam, Indonesia, Sénégal). He toured throughout 2011 in South America, Europe and Asia, and performed at the Java Jazz Festival, on its way to solo concerts in Vietnam and in the Emirates.

For the past 13 years Franck has been frequently featured at the famed Duc des Lombards jazz-club in Paris.

In 2019, his new quartet, featuring Cuban saxophonist Irving Acao, released "Gotham Goodbye" for the jazz&people label, to unanimous critical acclaim.

Franck's new trio cd, "The Summer Knows (un été 42)", recorded in 2024 in NYC, features bassist David Wong and drummer Kush Abadey.

== Discography ==
An asterisk (*) indicates that the year is that of release.

=== As leader/co-leader ===
Year recorded	Title	Label	Personnel/Notes
1990	Out a Day	OMD	Trio, with Gary Peacock (bass), Bill Stewart (drums)
1990	Another Time	Challenge/A	Trio, with Gary Peacock (bass), Bill Stewart (drums), reissue of Out a Day
1993*	Regards	Freelance	Quartet, with Tim Ries (sax), Scott Colley (bass), Bill Stewart (drums)
1996*	Is That So	Sunnyside	Trio, with Tim Ries (tenor sax), Leon Parker (drums, percussion)
1999*	Years Gone By	Challenge/A	Quartet, with Tim Ries (sax), Riccardo Del Fra (bass), Daniel Humair (drums)
2000*	On Second Thought	Naïve	With Tim Ries (alto sax, soprano sax), Johannes Weidenmuller (bass), Marc Miralta (drums)
2003	Summer Times	Sunnyside	Trio, with Johannes Weidenmuller (bass), Joe Chambers (drums)
2004*	Out a Day (reissue)	Nocturne Records	Trio, with Gary Peacock (bass), Bill Stewart (drums)
2005	A Week in Paris	Nocturne Records	Duo to sextet, with Rick Margitza (tenor sax), Stéphane Belmondo (trumpet), Darryl Hall (bass), Elisabeth Kontomanou (vocals), Dré Pallemaerts (drums)
2009*	Amsallem Sings	Fram	Solo piano and vocals
2014*	Franck Amsallem Sings Vol. II	Fram	Trio with Sylvain Romano (bass) and Karl Jannuska (drums)
2018*	At Barloyd	jazz&people	Solo piano
2019*	Gotham Goodbye	jazz&people	Quartet with Irving Acao (tenor sax), Viktor Nyberg (bass) and Gautier Garrigue (drums)
2025*	The Summer Knows (un été 42)	Continuo	Trio with David Wong (bass) and Kush Abadey (drums)

=== As sideman ===
- 1991 Toujours Michel Perez, with Ron Carter and Billy Drummond (Lazer/Instant Present 1009)
- 1991 Sous Verre Jean-Louis Almosnino & Nagette Haider with Jay Anderson and Adam Nussbaum (Lazer/Instant Present 1008)
- 1992 New York Stories Danny Gatton, with Bobby Watson, Joshua Redman and Roy Hargrove (Blue Note)
- 1995 Imaginary Time Tim Ries, with Randy Brecker, Ben Monder, Scott Colley and Joey Baron (Moo/Tokuma)
- 1996 Blue Note Then and Now with Jack Walrath, Bobby Watson, Judi Silvano, Tony Reedus and Jeff Andrews (Blue Note)
- 2000 Prism Quartet with Tim Ries, Michael Whitcombe, Matt Levy, Taimur Sullivan (Innova)
- 2006 Stones World Tim Ries, with Bernard Fowler, Fred Favarel, Thomas Bramerie and Charlie Watts (Sunnyside)
- 2007 Le Flirt de Satie Gerard Kleijn, with Paul Berner and Joost Kesselar
- 2009 New Life, David Prez, with Johannes Weidenmuller, and Bill Stewart (Paris Jazz Underground)
- 2012 Hands Down, Linus Olsson, avec Jean-Marc Jafet et Nicolas Viccaro
- 2014 Keys, Melanie Dahan, with Thomas Bramerie and Lukmil Perez (Backstage)
- 2017 Le Meilleur Moment du Monde, Jean-Marc Jafet, with Linus Olsson, Stéphane Guillaume and Alain Asplanato (VLF Productions)

== Awards ==
- 1981-1983: Full scholarship from Ministere des Affaires Etrangeres (France) to attend the Berklee College of Music
- 1983: Count Basie Award, Berklee College of Music.
- 1983-1984: Full scholarship from Ministere de la Culture (France) to attend the Berklee College of Music
- 1984: Oscar Peterson Award, Berklee College of Music.
- 1986-87: Scholarship award to attend the Manhattan School of Music
- 1989: Fondation Bleustein-Blanchet pour la Vocation Award (France)
- 1989: National Endowment for the Arts Fellowship to compose works for string orchestra.
- 1990: ASCAP Award For Young Composer.
- 1992: Great American Jazz Piano Competition (2nd prize)
- 2010: FAJE Award (French American Jazz Exchange)

== Sources ==
- Richard Cook & Brian Morton. The Penguin Guide to Jazz Recordings, 8th Edition, London, Penguin, 2006 ISBN 0-14-102327-9
- John Swenson. Rolling Stone Jazz Record Guide, 1999
