= Leon Parker =

American drummer (born 1965)

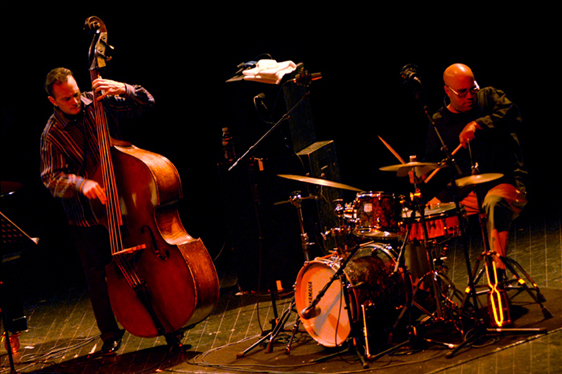
- Leon Parker, on the right, playing with Sean Smith

Background information
- Born: August 21, 1965 (age 60); White Plains, New York, United States
- Genres: Jazz
- Occupations: Percussionist, composer
- Years active: 1992–present

Leon Parker (born August 21, 1965 in White Plains, New York) is a jazz percussionist and composer. He is known for occasionally using a minimalist drum set with fewer components than usual, "sometimes consisting only of a snare drum, bass drum and a cymbal."

His 1998 album, Awakening (Columbia), reached the 20th position on Billboard's "Top Jazz albums" chart. It was his second album for Columbia.

Parker played on pianist Jacky Terrasson's first three albums. Parker toured with guitarist Charlie Hunter, who commented that "What I always look for in drummers is that they have a perfect blend of the visceral and the intellectual [...] Leon definitely had that."

== Discography ==
=== As leader ===
- 1994: Above & Below (Epicure)
- 1996: Belief (Columbia)
- 1998: Awakening (Columbia)
- 2001: The Simple Life (Label M)

=== Collaborations ===
- 1999: Duo with Charlie Hunter (Blue Note)

=== As sideman ===
With Jesse Davis

- As We Speak (Concord Jazz, 1992)
- Young at Art (Concord Jazz, 1993)

With Giovanni Mirabassi

- Terra Furiosa (Discograph, 2008)
- Out of Track (Discograph, 2009)

With Jacky Terrasson

- Jacky Terrasson (Blue Note, 1994)
- Reach (Blue Note, 1995)
- Alive (Blue Note, 1998)
- A Paris... (Blue Note, 2000)

With others

- Dewey Redman & Joshua Redman, Choices (Enja, 1992)
- MTB (Brad Mehldau, Mark Turner, Peter Bernstein), Consenting Adults (Criss Cross Jazz, 1994)
- Don Braden, Organic (Epicure, 1995)
- James Carter, The Real Quiet Storm (Atlantic, 1995)
- Franck Amsallem and Tim Ries, Is That So (Sunnyside, 1996)
- Virginia Mayhew, Nini Green (Chiaroscuro, 1997)
- Giovanni Mirabassi & Gianluca Renzi, Live At the Blue Note, Tokyo (Discograph, 2010)
