= Léona Gabriel =

French singer (1891–1971)

Léona Gabriel-Soïme
- Born: June 8, 1891; Rivière-Pilote, France
- Died: August 11, 1971 (aged 80); Fort-de-France, France
- Known for: singer, songwriter
- Notable work: Maladie d'amour, A si Paré

Léona Gabriel-Soïme (8 June 1891 — 11 August 1971) was a French biguine singer from Martinique, active in Paris during the interwar period. She married the military doctor Norbert Soïme in 1933.

== Biography ==
She was born on 8 June 1891, in Rivière-Pilote. Daughter of a white creole she grew up in Martinique, going to secretarial school in Cayenne, Guyana at age 14, going on to work as a secretary for the Lesseps company during the building of the Panama Canal. After returning for a period to Martinique she moved to Paris in 1920. In France she began singing and recording with the orchestra of clarinettist Alexandre Stellio under the stage name of Mademoiselle Estrella.

Her career as a singer continued until the 1960s. She was the aunt of Henri Salvador and supplied him with his best known tune "Maladie d'amour".

Gabriel returned to Martinique in the 1940s, becoming a radio presenter, a career which lasted over 30 years. She continued recording until the 1960s. She died on 11 August 1971, aged 80, in Fort-de-France.
