= Jesse Davis (saxophonist) =

American jazz saxophonist (born 1965)

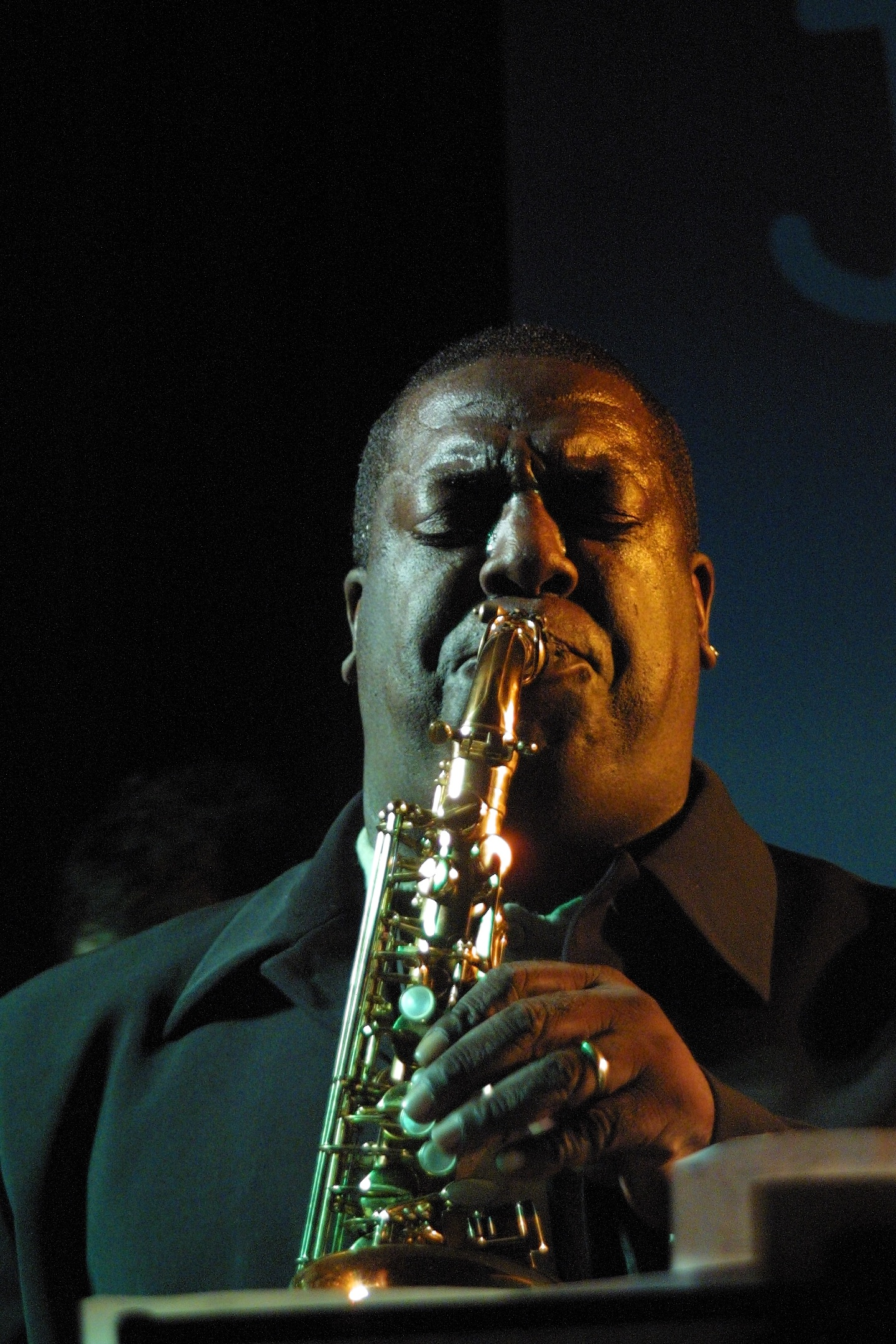
- Davis performing at the Blue Lamp, Aberdeen, 2004

Background information
- Born: Jesse William Davis; November 9, 1965 (age 60)
- Genre: Jazz
- Instrument: Alto saxophone
- Label: Concord Jazz

Jesse Davis (born September 11, 1965) is an American jazz saxophonist. He began as a student in Ellis Marsalis's New Orleans Center for Creative Arts. After graduating, Davis embarked on a productive jazz career, recording eight albums on the Concord Jazz label, alongside collaborations with such artists as Jack McDuff and Illinois Jacquet. Davis has studied music at Northeastern Illinois University, and in 1989 he received a "Most Outstanding Musician award" from DownBeat magazine.

== Discography ==
=== As leader/co-leader ===
- Horn of Passion (Concord, 1991) with Mulgrew Miller
- As We Speak (Concord, 1992) with Jacky Terrasson, Robert Trowers
- Young at Art (Concord, 1993) with Brad Mehldau
- High Standards (Concord, 1994) with Nicholas Payton, Dado Moroni, Peter Washington
- From Within (Concord, 1996) with Nicholas Payton, Hank Jones, Ron Carter, Lewis Nash
- First Insight (Concord, 1997) with Mulgrew Miller, Peter Bernstein, Ron Carter, Kenny Washington
- Second Nature (Concord, 2000)
- The Set-Up (All Tribe, 2002) with Peter Bernstein, Ray Drummond
- Live at Smalls (SmallsLIVE, 2012) with Spike Wilner, Peter Washington, Joe Farnsworth
- Reflections (Cellar Live / La Reserve Records, 2026) with Spike Wilner, John Webber, Lewis Nash

=== As a member ===
The Jazz Networks

- Blues 'N Ballads (Novus J, 1994) – rec. 1993
- In The Movies (Novus J, 1995) – rec. 1994
- The Other Day (Novus J, 1996)

=== As sideman ===
With Roy Hargrove

- Family (Verve, 1995)
- The Love Suite: In Mahogany (Blue Engine, 2023)

With others

- Charles Tolliver, Connect (Gearbox, 2020)
- Cedar Walton, As Long as There's Music (Muse, 1993) – rec. 1990
- Gerald Wilson, New York, New Sound (Mack Avenue, 2003)
