= Stéphane Belmondo =

Stephane Belmondo
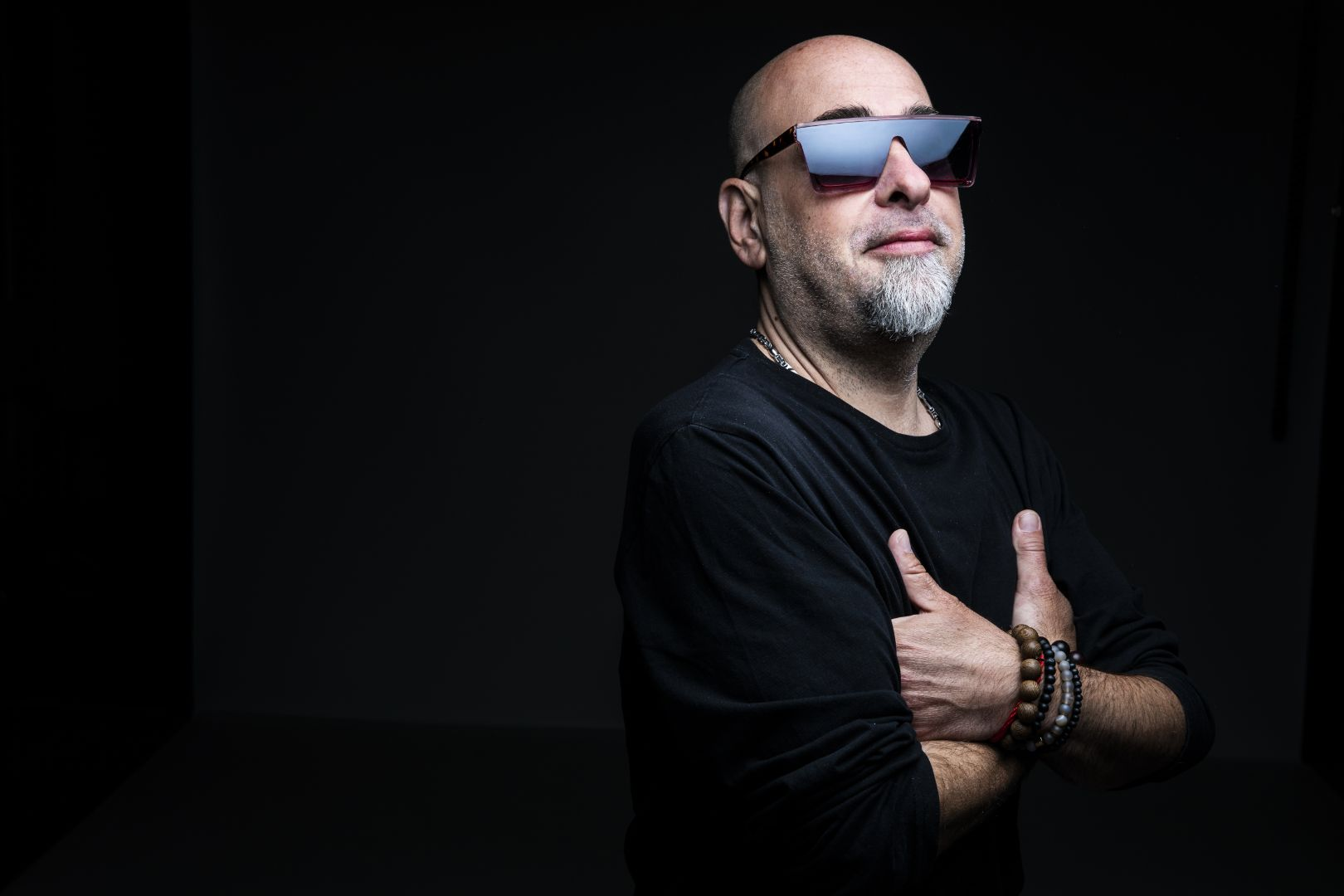
- Stephane Belmondo by Geraldine Aresteanu

Background information
- Born: July 8, 1967 (age 58); Hyères, Var, France
- Genres: Jazz, pop
- Instruments: Trumpet; Fluglehorn; French horn Bass-trumpet; Shells; Drums
- Years active: 1986–present
- Label: Verve/Universal

Stéphane Belmondo (French pronunciation: [stefan bɛlmɔ̃do]; born July 8, 1967) is a French jazz trumpeter, flugelhornist, and drummer. Including recordings made with his brother Lionel Belmondo and Yusef Lateef, he won the best French album category (L'Album français de l'année) in 2003, 2004 and 2005, and the best artist award (L'Artiste ou la Formation instrumentale française de l'année) in 2003 and 2004. in the French Victoires du Jazz awards. Along with his brother, he is noted for tribute albums that involve the musicians being honored.

== Biography ==
The Belmondo family say music came naturally to Stephane, before he could even speak. His father, Yvan, was proud of his son, but inflexible when it came down to his musical education. As a former professional saxophonist, he understood the necessity of discipline and practicing music requires. He was able to instill these values into his son from an early age and Belmondo quickly adopted these principles. He first started with drums and percussion instruments at the age of 6, accordion at 8, and took up the trumpet at age 10. He studied accordion and cornet at the Aix-en-Provence Conservatory of Music, before being admitted to the trumpet class of the Marseille Conservatory at 16. Belmondo was 14 when he finally took the stage with his accordion joining the big band led by his father and brother Lionel who played saxophone. When he and his brother started a quintet, Belmondo was 15 years old.

When Belmondo arrived in Paris to pursue his career, he met pianist René Urtreger, who gave him many opportunities to share the stage, notably with famed double-bassist Niels-Henning Ørsted Pedersen. He also worked with Pierre Michelot and Al Levitt, among many others.

In 1987, shortly after his arrival in Paris, he joined Laurent Cugny's big band, Lumière. Cugny had convinced arranger Gil Evans to come to France and work on the orchestra's repertoire. The collaboration resulted in two albums Rhythm-A-Ning and a European tour where Belmondo also recorded and performed with.

From 1987 to 1990, he played with pianist Kirk Lightsey's quartet and bassist Pierre Boussaguet's quintet, which also featured his brother and Jacky Terrasson. Working with Boussaguet led to the release of an album called Jazz aux Remparts featuring one of Belmondo's idols, the American trumpeter Tom Harrell.

Belmondo joined Michel Legrand’s big orchestra and took part in 1992 concert at the Olympia, where Legrand and Stéphane Grappelli appeared together for the first time. In 1992, he participated in the album Legrand/Grappelli with Legrand and Grapelli. He toured with them around the world. In 1994, Belmondo played in Dee Dee Bridgewater's trio and recorded the album Love and Peace with them in 1995, which featured Jimmy Smith.

In the same year, Belmondo moved to New York City. He continued touring with Dee Dee Bridgewater in the US, including shows at the Newport Festival and the Carnegie Hall. During his stay in New York, he played with many musicians, including Al Foster, Mark Turner, Lew Tabackin, Donald Brown, and Franck Amsallem. He recorded with pianist Donald Brown and his quartet performed at the Blue Note.

In 2002, in celebration of the fifteenth anniversary of Chet Baker's death, Belmondo performed with Jean-Louis Rassinfosse and Philip Catherine, two of Baker’s former partners.

Returning to Paris, he recorded his first solo album Wonderland in 2004, interpreting a collection of Stevie Wonder songs. This album won Belmondo two Victoires du Jazz awards in France, in 2005.

Belmondo met the saxophone and flute player Yusef Lateef and they together made an album called Influence (2005). Shortly after this, his group, including Lateef, toured Europe and around the world until 2008.

In 2008, Belmondo recorded with the great Brazilian singer, Milton Nascimento and they toured together.

Belmondo was also part of the development of new bugle and trumpet models which are marketed under the name "Concept TT" by the instrument maker Selmer.

== Discography ==
- As leader (or co-leader)
  - 2021 : Belmondo Quintet Brotherhood
  - 2016 : Stephane Belmondo & Jacky Terrasson ("Terramondo"), Mother (Impulse, ASIN : B01IQECAXQ)
  - 2015 : Stephane Belmondo, "Love for Chet" (Naive - ASIN: B00QU79TCM)
  - 2013 : Stephane Belmondo, "Ever After" (Emarcy/Universal Music France)
  - 2011 : Stephane Belmondo, "The Same As It Never Was Before" (Verve/Universal)
  - 2009 : Belmondo Quintet, "Infinity Live" (B-Flat recordings/Discograph)
  - 2008 : Belmondo & Milton Nascimento (B-Flat recordings/Discograph)
  - 2005 : Belmondo & Yusef Lateef, Influence (B-Flat recordings/Discograph)-Les Victoires du Jazz 2006 : meilleur album français
  - 2004 : Stephane Belmondo, Wonderland (B-Flat recordings/Discograph)-Les Victoires du Jazz 2005 : meilleur album français; meilleur artiste.
  - 2003 : Belmondo, Hymne au Soleil (B-Flat recordings/Discograph)-Les Victoires du Jazz 2004 : meilleur album français; meilleur artiste; prix du public
  - 2000 : Belmondo Quintet, Live au Plana (Plana Prod)
  - 2000 : Stephane Belmondo & Creative Art Trio, Endless Love (C.A.E Vulkan Records)
  - 1999 : Belmondo Quintet, Infinity (Shaï records)
  - 1999 : Stephane Belmondo et Sylvain Luc, Ameskery (Shaï records)
  - 1994 : Belmondo Quintet, For all friends (Challenge) (Réf : CHR70016)-Prix Django Reinhardt de l'Académie du jazz : meilleur musicien français.
  - 1993 : Lionel et Stephane Belmondo, Quintet, Jazz à Reims (auto-production)
- As sideman
  - 2021 : Philippe Gaillot - "CassIstanmbul" - (That Sound Records)
  - 2018 : Philippe Gaillot - "Be Cool" - (Ilona Records – LIR 8369345)
  - 2010 : Yael Naim, "She was a boy" (Tôt ou Tard)
  - 2009 : Aldo Romano, "Origine" (Dreyfus Jazz)
  - 2009 : Daniel Mille, "L'attente" (Universal Music France)
  - 2009 : Avishai Cohen, "Aurora" (Blue Note-EMI Music France)
  - 2008 : François Théberge Group with Lee Konitz, "Soliloque" (Cristal Records)
  - 2008 : Boulou & Elios Ferré, "Brothers to Brothers" (Nocturne)
  - 2008 : Étienne M'Bappé, "Su La Take" (O+ Evolution-EMI)
  - 2008 : Omar Sosa, "Afreecanos" (Otá Records/Harmonia Mundi)
  - 2008 : Ji Mob, "Power to the people" (Comet Records-Nocturne)
  - 2008 : Valery Graschaire, "Finally" (Cristal Records)
  - 2007 : Samy Thiebault, "Gaya Scienza" (B-Flat recordings/Discograph)
  - 2007 : Dré Pallemaerts, "Pan Harmonie" (B-Flat recordings/Discograph)
  - 2007 : Catia Werneck, "Catia canta Jobim" (Poission Heads)
  - 2006 : Boulou & Elios Ferré, "Live in Montpellier" (Le Chant du Monde-Harmonia Mundi)
  - 2006 : Éric Legnini, "Big Boogaloo" (Label Bleu)
  - 2006 : Stéphane Spira, "First Page" (BeeJazz Records) (Réf : BEE012)
  - 2005 : Sophie Alour, "Insulaire" (Nocturne) (Réf : NTCD381 - NT098)
  - 2005 : Boulou & Elios Ferré, "Parisian Passion" (BeeJazz Records-Abeille Music) (Réf : BEE015)
  - 2005 : Franck Amsallem, "A Week in Paris-A tribute to Strayhorn" (Nocturne) (Réf : NTCD383)
  - 2005 : Kayna Samet, "Entre Deux Je" (Barclay-Universal)
  - 2005 : Nu Tropic, "Você Sabe" (Nocturne)
  - 2005 : Psycho, "There must be a revolution somewhere" (Mind & Fat Records)
  - 2005 : Doctor L, "The real thing" (Mind & Fat Records)
  - 2005 : Doctor L, "Not your Frequency" (Mind & Fat Records)
  - 2005 : Jefferson, "Sweet Rendez Vous" (Nocturne)
  - 2004 : Daniel Mille, "Après la pluie" (Universal Music France)
  - 2004 : Carine Bonnefoy, "Something to change" (Cristal Records)
  - 2004 : Christophe Dal Sasso, "Ouverture" (Nocturne) (Réf : NTCD351)
  - 2004 : Claude Nougaro, "La Note Bleue" (Blue Note)
  - 2004 : L’Âme des Poètes, "Prénoms d’Amour" (Sowarex asbl)
  - 2003 : François Théberge, "Elénar" (Effendi)
  - 2003 : Jean-Louis Murat, "Lilith" (Labels)
  - 2003 : Doctor L, "Monkey Dizzyness" (Fat Recordings)
  - 2002 : Olivier Témime, "Saï Saï Saï" (Elabeth)
  - 2002 : François Théberge 5 featuring Lee, "Music of Konitz" (Effendi)
  - 2001 : Amalgam-Olivier Renne Quintet, “Osiris” (Shaï records)
  - 2000 : Jean-Marc Jafet, "Douceur Lunaire" (RDC Records/Mélodie)
  - 1999 : André Ceccarelli 4tet+, "61:32" (RCA Victor-BMG France)
  - 1999 : Chic Hot, "Satyagraha" (Lusafrica/Musisoft)
  - 1999 : Andy Emler, "Sombritude" (Casa/Disques Concord)
  - 1999 : François Théberge and The Medium Band, (Round Records)
  - 1999 : Donald Brown, "Enchanté" (Space Time Records)
  - 1998 : Frédéric Galliano Electronic Sextet, "Live Infinis" (F-Com)
  - 1998 : Manu Pekar & Big Band Passages featuring Dave Liebman, "New Songs" (Gorgone Productions)
  - 1997 : François Théberge, "Asteur" (Lazer Prod)
  - 1997 : Frédéric Galliano, "Espaces Baroques" (F-Com)
  - 1995 : Gilles Naturel, "Naturel" (JMS)
  - 1995 : Michel Legrand Big Band (Verve-Universal)
  - 1995 : Dee Dee Bridgewater, Love and Peace: A Tribute to Horace Silver (Verve) (Réf : 527 470-2)
  - 1994 : Orchestre National de Jazz dirigé par Laurent Cugny, "Yesternow" (Verve-Polygram)
  - 1994 : Alain Bashung "Chatterton" (Barclay)
  - 1994 : Jean Marc Jafet, "Agora" (JMS)
  - 1994 : Jean-Loup Longnon, "Cyclades" (JMS)
  - 1994 : Peter Kingsbery, “Once in a million” (Barclay)
  - 1994 : Marcel Azzola, "L'Accordéoniste, Hommage à Édith Piaf" (Verve-Polygram)
  - 1994 : Michel Precastelli, "Marazul" (CC Production/Harmonia Mundi)
  - 1993 : Simon Goubert, "Couleurs de peaux" (Seventh Records) (Réf : SEVENTH A XII)
  - 1993 : Jean-Michel Pilc, "Big one" (EMP)
  - 1993 : Elisabeth Kontomanou (EMP)
  - 1993 : Laurent Cugny Big Band Lumière, "Dromesko" (EmArcy-Polygram)
  - 1992 : Michel Legrand et Stéphane Grappelli, "Legrand/Grappelli" (Verve-Polygram)
  - 1991 : Pierre Boussaguet 5tet Special Guest Tom Harrell (Jazz aux Remparts)
  - 1991 : Abus, "Manège" (Musiclip)
  - 1990 : Laurent Cugny Big Band Lumière, "Santander" (EmArcy-Polygram)
  - 1989 : Marcel Zanini featuring Sam Woodyard, "Patchwork" (That's Jazz)
  - 1989 : Gil Evans et Laurent Cugny Big Band Lumière, "Golden hair" (EmArcy-Polygram)
  - 1988 : Gil Evans et Laurent Cugny Big Band Lumière, "Rhythm a ning" (EmArcy-Polygram)
- Compilations :
  - 1989 : Johnny Walker & Jazz, Live in Paris
