= Jacky Terrasson =

French jazz pianist and composer (born 1965)

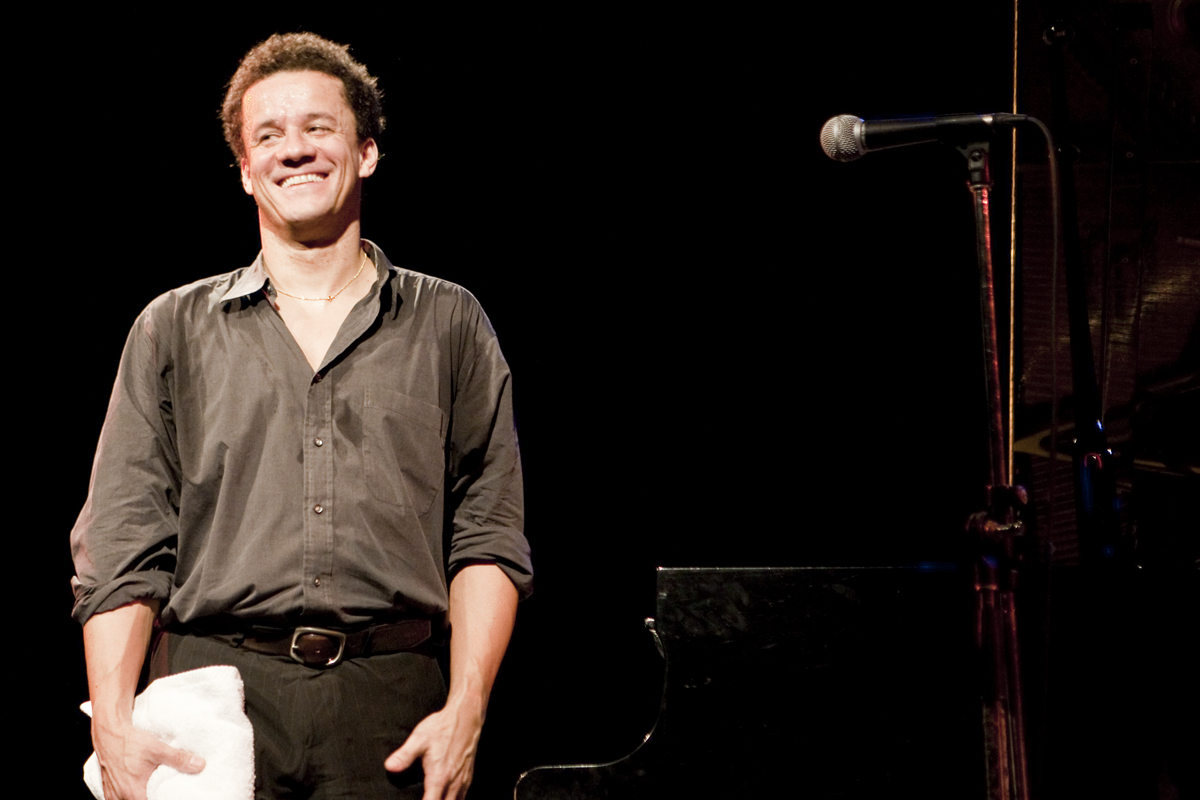
- Jacky Terrasson, Dortmund, 2010

Background information
- Born: Jacques-Laurent Terrasson; November 27, 1965 (age 60); Berlin, Germany
- Genres: Jazz
- Occupations: Musician, composer
- Instrument: Piano
- Years active: 1990s–present
- Labels: Blue Note, Impulse!
- Website: jackyterrasson.com

Jacky Terrasson (born November 27, 1965) is a French jazz pianist and composer.

== Background ==
Terrasson's mother is African-American from Georgia, and his father is French. From his parents he heard classical music as a child. He began piano lessons at an early age. He became interested in jazz when he heard his mother's albums of Miles Davis and Billie Holiday. Terrasson went to the Berklee College of Music in Boston for two semesters, then performed in clubs as a jazz pianist in Chicago and New York City. In 1993 he won the Thelonious Monk International Jazz Piano Competition. As the leader of a trio, Terrasson recorded his first solo album for Blue Note, then recorded with Jimmy Scott and Cassandra Wilson. He has worked with Stéphane Belmondo, Michael Brecker, Mino Cinélu, Ugonna Okegwo, Leon Parker, Michel Portal, Adam Rodgers, and Cécile McLorin Salvant. The Los Angeles Times wrote, "a pianist with a shining improvisational imagination, Terrasson seems clearly determined to follow his own path."

== Allegation of sexual abuse ==
In March 2026, Terrasson was the subject of a complaint by a sixteen-year-old girl who alleged that he raped her when she was six years old. Terrasson was questioned by investigators in late 2025. He denied the allegation. Prosecutors in Bordeaux confirmed that the investigation is ongoing.

== Discography ==
=== As leader/co-leader ===
- Moon and Sand with Tom Harrell (Jazz Aux Ramparts, 1991)
- Lover Man (Venus, 1994) – rec. 1993
- Jacky Terrasson (Blue Note, 1994)
- Reach (Blue Note, 1995)
- Rendezvous with Cassandra Wilson (Blue Note, 1997)
- Alive (Blue Note, 1998) – live rec. 1997
- What It Is (Blue Note, 1999) – rec. 1998
- A Paris... (Blue Note, 2000)
- Kindred with Stefon Harris (Blue Note, 2001)
- Smile (Blue Note, 2002)
- Into the Blue with Emmanuel Pahud (Blue Note, 2003) – rec. 2001
- Mirror (Blue Note, 2007) – rec. 2006
- Push (Concord Jazz, 2010) – rec. 2009
- Gouache (Universal, 2012)
- Take This (Impulse!, 2015) – rec. 2014
- Mother with Stéphane Belmondo (Impulse!, 2016)
- 53 (Blue Note, 2019)
- Moving On (Earth-Sounds, 2024)

=== As sideman ===
With Cindy Blackman

- In the Now (Highnote, 1998) – rec. 1997
- Telepathy (Muse, 1994) – rec. 1992

With Ry Cooder

- Music from the Motion Picture Primary Colors (MCA, 1998)
- Chavez Ravine (Nonesuch, 2005)
- My Name Is Buddy (Nonesuch, 2007)

With Philippe Gaillot

- Be Cool (Ilona, 2018)
- CassIstanmbul (That Sound, 2022)

With Javon Jackson

- When the Time Is Right (Blue Note, 1994) - rec. 1993
- For One Who Knows (Blue Note, 1995)

With others

- Stefano di Battista, Stefano di Battista (Blue Note, 2000)
- Ray Brown, Ray Brown's New Two Bass Hits (Capri, 1992)
- Jesse Davis, As We Speak (Concord Jazz, 1992)
- Eddie Harris, Freedom Jazz Dance (Venus, 1994)
- Jon Hassell, Fascinoma (Water Lily Acoustics, 1999)
- Irvin Mayfield and Jaz Sawyer, Live at the Blue Note (Half Note, 2000) – live
- Leon Parker, Above and Below (Epicure, 1994)
- Dianne Reeves, Quiet After the Storm (Blue Note, 1994)
- Antoine Roney, The Traveler (Muse, 1994)
- Wallace Roney, Seth Air (Muse, 1991)
- Jimmy Scott, Heaven (Warner Bros., 1996)
- Art Taylor, Wailin' at the Vanguard (Verve, 1993) – live
