= Bo Burnham discography =

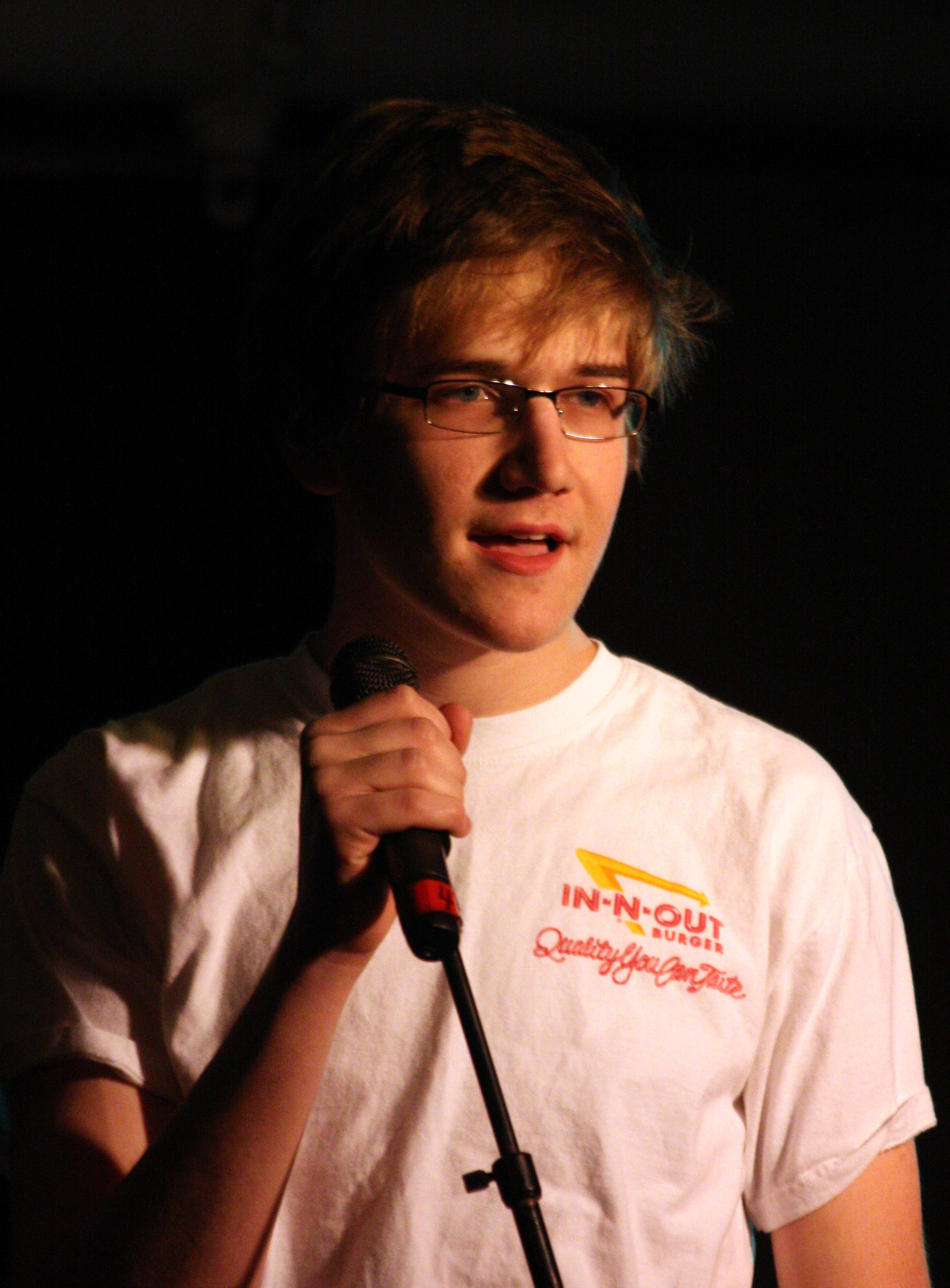
- Extended plays: 2
- Soundtrack albums: 1
- Live albums: 3
- Singles: 3

The discography of American musical comedian Bo Burnham consists of three live albums, one soundtrack, one reissue, two extended plays, and three singles.

== Albums ==
=== Live albums ===
List of live albums, with selected information
Title	Details	Peak chart positions			Certifications (sales thresholds)
Title	Details	US	US Comedy	US Indie	Certifications (sales thresholds)
Bo Burnham	Released: March 10, 2009; Label: Comedy Central (CCR0078); Format: CD, download	105	1	12	RIAA: Gold (Video Longform)
Words Words Words	Released: October 19, 2010; Label: Comedy Central (CCR0101); Format: CD, download	40	1	3	
what.	Released: December 17, 2013; Label: Comedy Central (CCR0101); Format: CD, download	— (Note: what. did not enter the US Billboard 200, but did peak at number 168 on the US Current Album Sales chart.)	1	31	

=== Soundtrack albums ===
List of soundtrack albums, with selected information
Title	Details	Peak chart positions										Certifications
Title	Details	US	US Comedy	US Indie	CAN	IRE	NLD	NOR	NZ	SWE	UK	Certifications
Inside (The Songs)	Released: June 10, 2021; Label: Attic Bedroom, Imperial, Ingrooves, Mercury; Format: Digital download, streaming, 2xLP, CD, Cassette	7	1	18	6	4	15	5	6	22	5	RIAA: Platinum; BPI: Gold

=== Reissues ===
List of reissued albums, with selected information
Title	Details	Peak chart positions
Title	Details	NZ
Inside (Deluxe)	Released: June 3, 2022; Label: Attic Bedroom, Imperial, Ingrooves, Mercury; Format: Digital download, streaming	34

== Extended plays ==
List of extended plays, with selected information
Title	Details	Peak chart positions				
Title	Details	US	US Comedy	US Indie	IRE	UK
Bo fo Sho	Released: June 17, 2008; Label: Comedy Central (CCR0068); Format: Download	123	3	16	―	―
The Inside Outtakes	Released: June 3, 2022; Label: Attic Bedroom, Imperial, Ingrooves, Republic; Format: Digital download, streaming	―	10	―	67	68

== Singles ==
List of singles, with selected chart positions
Title	Year	Peak chart positions	Album
Title	Year	US Comedy Digital	Album
"Words, Words, Words"	2010	2	Words Words Words
"Oh Bo"	2010	1	Words Words Words
"Nerds"	2013	―	what.
"All Eyes On Me (Song Only)"	2021	―	Inside
"All Eyes On Me (The Outtakes Version)"	2022	―	Inside (Deluxe)
"—" denotes a recording that did not chart.

== Other charted songs ==
List of other charted songs, with selected chart positions
Title	Year	Peak chart positions								Certifications	Album
Title	Year	US Bub.	US Comedy Digital	CAN	IRE	NZ Hot	SWE	UK	WW	Certifications	Album
"I'm Bo Yo"	2009	—	5	—	—	—	—	—	—		Bo Burnham
"My Whole Family..."	2009	—	17	—	—	—	—	—	—		Bo Burnham
"Love Is..." (Live)	2009	—	14	—	—	—	—	—	—		Bo Burnham
"High School Party"	2009	—	21	—	—	—	—	—	—		Bo Burnham
"New Math" (Live)	2009	—	16	—	—	—	—	—	—		Bo Burnham
"Ironic"	2010	—	12	—	—	—	—	—	—		Words Words Words
"Rant"	2010	—	13	—	—	—	—	—	—		Words Words Words
"Art Is Dead"	2010	—	17	—	—	—	—	—	—		Words Words Words
"From God's Perspective"	2013	—	12	—	—	—	—	—	—		what.
"Repeat Stuff"	2013	—	5	—	—	—	—	—	—		what.
"Bezos I"	2021	21	—	87	51	—	79	44	141	RIAA: Platinum	Inside (The Songs)
"Look Who's Inside Again"	2021	—	—	—	74	24	—	94	—	RIAA: Gold	Inside (The Songs)
"Welcome to the Internet"	2021	8	—	82	50	16	—	66	—	RIAA: Platinum; BPI: Silver; RMNZ: Gold	Inside (The Songs)
"All Eyes On Me"	2021	2	—	63	30	22	92	47	119	RIAA: Platinum; BPI: Silver; RMNZ: Gold	Inside (The Songs)
"Goodbye"	2021	—	—	—	—	29	—	—	—	RIAA: Gold	Inside (The Songs)
"The Future"	2022	—	—	—	—	30	—	—	—		The Inside Outtakes
"1985"	2022	—	—	—	—	21	—	—	—		The Inside Outtakes
"Five Years"	2022	—	—	—	—	26	—	—	—		The Inside Outtakes
"Biden"	2022	—	—	—	—	24	—	—	—		The Inside Outtakes
"—" denotes a recording that did not chart or was not released in that territory.

== Guest appearances ==
List of non-single guest appearances, showing other artist(s), year released and album name
Title	Year	Other artist(s)	Album
"Ying Yang Friends"	2011	T.J. Miller	The Extended Play E.P.
"Battle of the Century, Part III"	2011	T.J. Miller	The Extended Play E.P.

== Production, writing, and other credits ==
List of songs written and/or produced by Bo Burnham, showing other artist(s), year released, and album name
Title	Year	Artist	Album	Credit	Other artist(s)
"The Outside"	2026	Phoebe Bridgers	Lost Weekend	Vocals	
"Lost Boys"	2026	Phoebe Bridgers	Lost Weekend	Songwriting	Co-written with Phoebe Bridgers, Alex G, Marshall Vore, and Christian Lee Hutson
"The Governor's Walz"	2026	Phoebe Bridgers	Lost Weekend	Songwriting	Co-written with Phoebe Bridgers, Marshall Vore, and Christian Lee Hutson
"Bobby"	2026	Phoebe Bridgers	Lost Weekend	Songwriting & vocals	Co-written with Phoebe Bridgers, Marshall Vore, and Christian Lee Hutson
"Haunted"	2026	Phoebe Bridgers	Lost Weekend	Songwriting	Co-written with Phoebe Bridgers, Marshall Vore, Christian Lee Hutson, Lucy Dacus, Alex G, Maya Hawke, and Jack Antonoff
"Never Going Back!"	2026	Phoebe Bridgers	Lost Weekend	Vocals	
"I Can't Wait	2026	Phoebe Bridgers	Lost Weekend	Songwriting	Co-written with Phoebe Bridgers and Christian Lee Hutson
"As Above"	2026	Phoebe Bridgers	Lost Weekend	Songwriting	Co-written with Phoebe Bridgers, Marshall Vore, and Christian Lee Hutson
"Lost Weekend (Reprise)"	2026	Phoebe Bridgers	Lost Weekend	Songwriting	Co-written with Phoebe Bridgers and Damien Jurado
"Best Dressed"	2026	Phoebe Bridgers	Lost Weekend	Songwriting	Co-written with Phoebe Bridgers and Christian Lee Hutson
