= List song =

Genre of songs

A list song, also called a laundry list song or a catalog song, is a song based wholly or in part on a list. Unlike topical songs with a narrative and a cast of characters, list songs typically develop by working through a series of information, often comically, articulating their images additively, and sometimes use items of escalating absurdity.

The form as a defining feature of an oral tradition dates back to early classical antiquity, where it played an important part of early hexameter poetry for oral bards like Homer and Hesiod.

In classical opera, the list song has its own genre, the catalogue aria, that was especially popular in Italian opera buffa and comic opera in the latter half of the eighteenth and early nineteenth centuries. Leporello's aria "Madamina, il catalogo è questo" (lit. '"Little lady, this is the catalogue"'), also nicknamed The Catalogue Aria, is a prominent example, and often mentioned as a direct antecedent to the 20th-century musical's list song.

The list song is a frequent element of 20th-century popular music and became a Broadway staple. Cole Porter, Irving Berlin, Noël Coward, and Stephen Sondheim are composers and lyricists who have used the form. The very first commercial recording of a Cole Porter tune was his list song "I've a Shooting Box in Scotland" originally from See America First (1913). Berlin followed soon after with the list song "When I Discovered You" from his first complete Broadway score, Watch Your Step (1914).

Porter would frequently return to the list song form. Notable examples include "You're the Top" from the 1934 musical Anything Goes, "Friendship", one of Porter's wittiest list songs, from DuBarry Was a Lady, and "Farming" and "Let's Not Talk About Love", both from Let's Face It! (1942), and both written for Danny Kaye to showcase his ability with tongue-twisting lyrics. In "You're the Top", Porter pays tribute to his colleague Irving Berlin by including the item "You're the top! You're a Berlin ballad."

Irving Berlin would likewise often write songs in the genre; notable examples include "My Beautiful Rhinestone Girl" from Face the Music (1932), a list song that starts off with a sequence of negative similes, "Outside of That I Love You" from Louisiana Purchase, and "Anything You Can Do (I Can Do Better)" a challenge-duet, and Berlin's starkest antithesis-driven list song, "You Can't Get a Man with a Gun", and "Doin' What Comes Natur'lly", all three from the 1946 musical Annie Get Your Gun.

== List of list songs ==
Examples of list songs, and their composers/performers, include the following.

List songs
Song title	Artist(s)	Notes	Refs
"100 Great People Who Made Korea Shine"	Park Moon-young, performed by Choi Young-Jun and Nosasa		
"&"	Tally Hall		
"'A' You're Adorable"	Sid Lippman, Buddy Kaye and Fred Wise		
"A Boy Without a Girl"	Anthony Newley	1960	
"A Hard Rain's a-Gonna Fall"	Bob Dylan		
"A Little Priest"	Stephen Sondheim and Hugh Wheeler from Sweeney Todd: The Demon Barber of Fleet Street		
"A Little Something Refreshing"	Eric Stefani, performed by No Doubt		
"A Simple Desultory Philippic (Or How I Was Robert McNamara'd Into Submission)"	Paul Simon, performed by Simon and Garfunkel		
"A13 Trunk Road to the Sea"	Billy Bragg, first released in 1991 on The Peel Sessions Album; based on "(Get Your Kicks on) Route 66" by Bobby Troup		
"Absurd"	Fluke	lists children's characters in adult situations	
"Ah, Paris!"	Stephen Sondheim, from the 1971 musical Follies	a geographical list song	
"All I Really Want to Do"	Bob Dylan	featured on his Tom Wilson-produced 1964 album, Another Side of Bob Dylan	
"Area Codes"	Ludacris		
"Around the World"	Red Hot Chili Peppers		
"Arrasando"	Thalia		
"Art Eats Art"	Orchestral Manoeuvres in the Dark	lists many historical arts figures	
"A Well-Dressed Hobbit"	Rie Sheridan Rose, Marc Gunn		
"Ain't Got No"	from the musical Hair		
"All My Ex's Live in Texas"	George Strait and Whitey Shafer		
"American Bad-ass"	Kid Rock		
"All the Words in the English Language"	from Animaniacs		
"Anything You Can Do (I Can Do Better)"	from the musical Annie Get Your Gun		
"As Some Day It May Happen" ("I've got a little list")	from The Mikado by Gilbert & Sullivan	Adaptation to include local and topical references is customary	
"At Long Last Love"	Cole Porter, for his 1938 musical You Never Know		
"At the Hop"	Danny and the Juniors	lists many popular dances of the late 1950s	
"The Bad Touch"	Bloodhound Gang	lists many euphemisms for sexual acts	
"The Bare Necessities"	from the animated 1967 Disney film The Jungle Book		
"Bahay Kubo"	traditional	lists vegetables found in the surrounding of a farm	
"Because I Got High"	Afroman		
"Before He Cheats"	Carrie Underwood		
"The Begat"	Burton Lane and E.Y. Harburg		
"Better Than Anything"	David "Buck" Wheat & Bill Loughborough	lists all the things love is better than	
The Big Bamboo	traditional Caribbean		
"Black Boys"	from the musical Hair		
"Blue"	from the 2014 musical Heathers: The Musical with music, lyrics, and a book by Laurence O'Keefe and Kevin Murphy		
"Bob"	"Weird Al" Yankovic	lists palindromes, in a parody of "Subterranean Homesick Blues" by Bob Dylan.	
"The Booklovers"	The Divine Comedy		
"Break My Soul (The Queens Remix)"	interpolates Vogue by Madonna	listing black cultural icons and ballroom houses	
"Brothers and Sisters"	Blur		
"Brush Up Your Shakespeare"	Cole Porter from Kiss Me, Kate		
"But In The Morning, No"	Cole Porter from DuBarry Was a Lady		
"California Girls"	The Beach Boys		
"Can U Dig It"	Pop Will Eat Itself		
"Carol Brown"	Flight of the Conchords		
"Cherry Pies Ought to Be You"	with music and lyrics by Cole Porter for his 1950 musical Out of This World		
"Coda: I Have A Dream"	King Crimson		
"Chop Suey,"	music by Richard Rodgers, words by Oscar Hammerstein II, introduced by Juanita Hall and Patrick Adiarte in Flower Drum Song		
"Coded Language"	Krust / Saul Williams		
"Collection of Stamps"	I'm from Barcelona		
"Come Back To Me"	with lyrics by Alan Jay Lerner for Burton Lane's On a Clear Day You Can See Forever		
"Come Together"	The Beatles		
"Come To the Supermarket In Old Peking"	Cole Porter		
"Comedy Tonight"	from A Funny Thing Happened on the Way to the Forum by Stephen Sondheim		
"Conga!"	music by Leonard Bernstein, words by Betty Comden and Adolph Green, introduced by Rosalind Russell in Wonderful Town		
"Could I Leave You?"	by Stephen Sondheim for the 1971 musical Follies		
"Count It Up"	from Field Music's 2018 album Open Here		
"Cuntry Boner"	Puscifer		
"Danceteria"	From Madonna's 2026 album Confessions II	Name-checks notable people from the New York club scene who frequented Danceteria in the early '80s	
"Datura"	Tori Amos		
"Daves I Know"	Bruce McCulloch		
"Destroy Rock & Roll"	Mylo		
"Dinner with Friends"	Kacey Musgraves		
"Disappointing"	John Grant		
"DJ Bombay"	Michael V.	list down things that are sold by Indian nationals in the Philippines	
"Do I Love You?"	Cole Porter from DuBarry Was a Lady		
"Done Too Soon"	Neil Diamond		
"Don't Let's Be Beastly to the Germans"	Noël Coward		
"Don't Put Your Daughter on the Stage, Mrs Worthington"	Noël Coward		
"Do You Remember These"	The Statler Brothers		
"DuBarry Was a Lady"	Cole Porter from DuBarry Was a Lady		
"Dumb Ways to Die"	advertising campaign for Metro Trains Melbourne		
"Eclipse"	Pink Floyd		
"Eight Easy Steps"	Alanis Morissette		
"88 Lines About 44 Women"	The Nails		
"The Elements"	Tom Lehrer		
"Elephant Talk"	King Crimson		
"Endless Art"	A House		
"Every Tube Station Song"	Jay Foreman		
"Everybody Knows"	Leonard Cohen	1988	
"Everybody Loves Raymond"	Lemon Demon		
"Everything Is Alright"	Motion City Soundtrack		
"Far Out"	Blur		
"Farming"	Cole Porter from Let's Face It!	1942	
"F.E.A.R."	Ian Brown		
"Female"	from Keith Urban's 2018 album Graffiti U		
"50 Things You Should Think About to Stop You Doing Your Beans"	Kunt and the Gang		
"50 Ways to Leave Your Lover"	Paul Simon		
"50 Ways to Say Goodbye"	Train		
"52 Girls"	B-52s		
"Forever Young"	Bob Dylan		
"Foxtrot Uniform Charlie Kilo"	The Bloodhound Gang		
"Friends"	Adam and the Ants		
"Friendship"	Cole Porter from DuBarry Was a Lady		
"Gee, Officer Krupke"	Stephen Sondheim (lyrics) and Leonard Bernstein (music) from West Side Story		
"Get Me Bodied"	Beyoncé		
"Girl of 100 Lists"	Go-Go's		
"Gin Soaked Boy"	The Divine Comedy		
"Give Peace A Chance"	John Lennon		
"God"	John Lennon		
"God Bless"	Combichrist	lists infamous murderers and cult leaders	
"Going Nowhere Slow"	The Bloodhound Gang	lists cities across the USA	
"Good Doctor"	Robbie Williams		
"The Green Grass Grows All Around"	traditional		
"Green Grow the Rushes, O"	traditional		
"Hair"	from the musical Hair		
"Hank Williams Said it Best"	Guy Clark		
"Hardware Store"	"Weird Al" Yankovic		
"Hashish"	from the musical Hair		
"Hello"	The Beloved		
"High Tech Redneck"	George Jones		
"Hippopotamus"	Sparks		
"Hot Topic"	Le Tigre		
"How About You?"	Burton Lane/Ralph Freed		
"Hungarian Goulash No. 5"	Lyrics by Alan Sherman, music is Hungarian Dance No. 5 in F♯ minor written by Johannes Brahms		
"Hypersonic Missiles"	Sam Fender		
"I Can't Get Started (With You)"	Ira Gershwin and Vernon Duke		
"I Dreamed Of A Hillbilly Heaven"	Tex Ritter		
"I Get a Kick Out of You"	Cole Porter, first sung in the 1934 musical Anything Goes		
"I Got Life"	from the musical Hair		
"I Like It"	Cardi B		
"I Started a Blog Nobody Read"	Sprites		
"Iedereen doet 't"	Robert Long	Dutch hit, 1986	
"If I Had $1000000"	Barenaked Ladies		
"If I Were a Boy"	Beyoncé		
"I'm Black/Ain't Got No"	from the musical Hair		
"I'm in Love with the Girl on the Manchester Virgin Megastore Check-out Desk"	The Freshies		
"I'm Proud of the BBC"	Mitch Benn		
"I'm Still Here"	Stephen Sondheim		
"I'm Trying"	from Adam Gwon's 2008 musical Ordinary Days		
"Imperfect List"	Big Hard Excellent Fish		
"In Front of Me Now"	Nada Surf		
"Ironic"	Bo Burnham		
"Isang Linggong Pag-Ibig"	Imelda Papin		
"It Ain't Necessarily So"	with lyrics by Ira Gershwin from George Gershwin's opera Porgy and Bess		
"It's an Elk"	from the 2013 musical Bubble Boy with music and lyrics by Cinco Paul		
"It's Grim Up North"	The Justified Ancients of Mu Mu		
"It's the End of the World as We Know It (And I Feel Fine)"	R.E.M.		
"I've a Shooting Box in Scotland"	Cole Porter from See America First		
"I've Been Everywhere"	Lucky Starr (original), Geoff Mack (U.S.A. adaptation)		
"Jung Talent Time"	TISM		
"Kidney Bingos"	Wire		
"Kokomo"	The Beach Boys		
"La Vie Bohème"	Jonathan Larson		
"The Lady Is a Tramp"	from the 1937 Rodgers and Hart musical Babes in Arms		
"Let 'em In"	Wings		
"Let's Call the Whole Thing Off"	George Gershwin and Ira Gershwin		
"Let's Do It, Let's Fall in Love"	Cole Porter		
"Let's Not Talk About Love"	Cole Porter from Let's Face It! (1942)		
"Liaisons"	Stephen Sondheim from A Little Night Music		
"Life Is a Rock (But the Radio Rolled Me)"	Reunion		
"Lime Jello Marshmallow Cottage Cheese Surprise"	William Bolcom, performed by Joan Morris		
"List of Films"	Nick Helm		
"Losing My Edge"	LCD Soundsystem		
"Lost Property"	The Divine Comedy		
"Love Is..."	Bo Burnham		
"Love Your Love the Most"	Eric Church	lists everything he loves	
"Lower 48"	The Gourds		
"Lydia the Tattooed Lady"	Groucho Marx from At The Circus		
"Mad Dogs and Englishmen"	Noël Coward		
"Madamina, il catalogo è questo"	Mozart ("The Catalogue Aria" from Don Giovanni)		
"Mambo No. 5"	Lou Bega and Perez Prado		
"Man on the Moon"	R.E.M.		
"Manhattan"	Richard Rodgers, Lorenz Hart		
"Marz"	John Grant		
"Matangi"	M.I.A.		
"Merry Christmas Everyone"	Shakin' Stevens		
"MfG"	Die Fantastischen Vier		
"Miracles"	Insane Clown Posse		
"Miss Sarajevo"	U2		
"Mistletoe and Wine"	Cliff Richard		
"Mr. Goldstone"	music, Jule Styne; lyrics, Stephen Sondheim		
"? (Modern Industry)"	Fishbone		
"Moments to Remember"	Robert Allen and Al Stillman		
"Money for Dope"	They Might Be Giants		
"Mope"	The Bloodhound Gang		
"My Favorite Things"	Rodgers and Hammerstein		
"My Kind of Town (Chicago Is)"	Jimmy Van Heusen and Sammy Cahn	Big hit for Frank Sinatra extolling the virtues of Chicago	
"My Funny Valentine"	Richard Rodgers		
"My Ship"	music by Kurt Weill and lyrics by Ira Gershwin		
"Name Game"	Shirley Ellis		
"Napoleon"	with lyrics by Yip Harburg and music by Harold Arlen from Jamaica		
"Never Gonna Give You Up"	Rick Astley		
"New Direction"	Sugar Ray	lists things you can do to make yourself a better person	
"New Math"	Bo Burnham		
"New Rules"	Dua Lipa		
"No Guarantee"	Manfred Mann's Earth Band		
"No Hay Nadie Como Tú"	Calle 13		
"Not"	Big Thief		
"Numb"	U2		
"Nunal"	Vincent Daffalong		
"Occupation"	Sparks		
"One By the Venom"	Finn Andrews		
"One Hundred Easy Ways (To Lose a Man)"	from Leonard Bernstein's 1953 musical Wonderful Town		
"One Bourbon, One Scotch, One Beer"	Rudy Toombs		
"One More Minute"	"Weird Al" Yankovic		
"One Week"	Barenaked Ladies		
"Overdrive"	Eraserheads	mentions places in the Philippines	
"Paren de Venir"	The Sacados		
"Pencil Full of Lead"	Paolo Nutini		
"Penny Lane"	The Beatles		
"People Who Died"	Jim Carroll		
"Pennsylvania"	The Bloodhound Gang		
"Pepper"	Butthole Surfers		
"Perfume"	Sparks		
"The Physician"	Cole Porter for the musical Nymph Errant		
"Plane Too"	Loudon Wainwright III		
"Play with Me"	Extreme (band)		
"Pokerap"	Pokémon		
"Polkamon"	"Weird Al" Yankovic		
"Poor Young Millionaire"	Cole Porter		
"Porn Star Dancing"	My Darkest Days featuring Zakk Wylde and Chad Kroeger		
"Portobello Road"	from Walt Disney film Bedknobs and Broomsticks		
"Poster Child"	Red Hot Chili Peppers		
"The Pride"	Five Finger Death Punch		
"Questions and Answers (The Three B's)"	from the musical On Your Toes (Rodgers and Hart)		
"Raise Up"	Petey Pablo		
"Ramblin' Man"	Lemon Jelly		
"The Rattlin' Bog"	traditional		
"Reasons to be Cheerful, Part 3"	Ian Dury & the Blockheads		
“Red"	Taylor Swift		
"The Referee's Alphabet"	Half Man Half Biscuit		
"Rickets"	Deftones		
"Rhode Island Is Famous For You"	with lyrics by Howard Dietz and music by Arthur Schwartz from Inside U.S.A.		
"Rock & Roll Heaven"	The Righteous Brothers		
"Rock Lobster"	The B-52's		
"(Get Your Kicks on) Route 66"	Bobby Troup		
"Royals"	Lorde	lists subjects of modern pop songs	
"Sad"	Bo Burnham		
"The Saga of Jenny"	with music by Kurt Weill and lyrics by Ira Gershwin written for the 1941 Broadway musical Lady in the Dark		
"Said the Hobbit to the Horse"	Marc Gunn		
"The Sample Song"	Dorothy Shay		
"Short Memory"	Midnight Oil		
"Show Me What You Got"	Limp Bizkit		
"Seven Curses"	Bob Dylan		
"7 Things"	Miley Cyrus		
"Sidekick Heaven"	Riders in the Sky		
"Sinaktan mo ang puso ko"	Michael V.	lists down the hurtful things that his lover did	
"Sixteen Reasons"	Bill and Doree Post	#3 hit for Connie Stevens in 1960	
"Slow Train"	Flanders and Swann		
"Slug"	Passengers (U2 and Brian Eno)		
"Sodomy"	from the musical Hair		
"Soldier's Things"	Tom Waits		
"Song for Whoever"	The Beautiful South		
"Stairway to Cleveland (We Do What We Want)"	Jefferson Starship		
"Starfish and Coffee"	Prince		
"Stars on 45"	Stars on 45		
"Start Button"	2ManyDJs		
"The Stately Homes of England"	by Noël Coward from his 1938 musical Operette		
"Still"	Alanis Morissette	mostly a list of things that people do (mostly bad)	
"Subterranean Homesick Blues"	Bob Dylan		
"Super Supper March"	Nigel Pilkington		
"Sweet Little Sixteen"	Chuck Berry		
"Tschaikowsky (and Other Russians)"	with lyrics by Ira Gershwin and music by Kurt Weill	lists the names of fifty-three composers of Tsarist and Soviet Russia	
The chorus of "Tam Pierce"	Widdecombe Fair	lists all the people accompanying the narrator to the fair	
"Teachers"	Daft Punk		
"Technologic"	Daft Punk		
"Telecide"	The Tubes		
"Telefonbuchpolka"	Georg Kreisler		
"Ten Commandments of Love"	The Moonglows		
"Ten Crack Commandments"	The Notorious B.I.G.		
"That Is the End of the News"	by Noël Coward from his 1945 musical revue Sigh No More		
"That Funny Feeling"	Bo Burnham		
"That's a Rectangle"	Storybots		
"That's Country Bro"	Toby Keith		
"There Ain't No Easy Run"	Dave Dudley		
"There Is Nothing Like a Dame"	Richard Rodgers with lyrics by Oscar Hammerstein II		
"These Foolish Things"	Eric Maschwitz and Jack Strachey		
"They All Fall In Love"	Cole Porter		
"They All Laughed (song)"	George Gershwin and Ira Gershwin		
"They Are Night Zombies!! They Are Neighbors!! They Have Come Back from the Dead!! Ahhhh!"	Sufjan Stevens		
"Things I Won't Get"	FFS		
"Things In My Jeep"	The Lonely Island and Linkin Park		
"Things to Do (I've Tried)"	David Byrne		
"The Things You Left Behind"	The Nails	1986	
"Third Uncle"	Brian Eno, Brian Turrington		
"This'll Be My Year"	Train		
"Thou Shalt Always Kill"	Dan le sac Vs Scroobius Pip		
"Thou Shalt Not"	with lyrics by Don Black and music by Jule Styne from Bar Mitzvah Boy		
"Till the End of Time"	Buddy Kaye and Ted Mossman		
"To Keep My Love Alive"	composed by Richard Rodgers with lyrics by Lorenz Hart for the musical A Connecticut Yankee		
"To Kokoraki"	Flanders and Swann		
"Too Much Monkey Business"	Chuck Berry		
"Transmetropolitan"	The Pogues		
"Turn a Blind Eye"	Half Man Half Biscuit		
"Turn! Turn! Turn!"	Pete Seeger	after King Solomon (Ecclesiastes)	
"The Twelve Days of Christmas"	traditional		
"21 Things I Want in a Lover"	Alanis Morissette		
"The Ultimate Showdown of Ultimate Destiny"	Lemon Demon		
"The Unthinkable"	Boom Bip		
"Van Lingle Mungo"	Dave Frishberg		
"Vinyl Records"	Todd Snider		
"Vitamin"	Kraftwerk		
"Vogue"	Madonna	Name-checks movie stars from the Golden Age of Hollywood	
"Vuelve"	Shakira		
"Wakko's America"	from Animaniacs		
"Walk Away"	Franz Ferdinand		
"Waters of March"	Antonio Carlos Jobim		
"Welcome to the Internet"	Bo Burnham		
"We Care a Lot"	Faith No More		
"We Didn't Start the Fire"	Billy Joel		
"We Didn't Start the Fire"	Fall Out Boy		
"We're All Gonna Die!!!"	Baby FuzZ		
"What a Wonderful World"	Thiele and Weiss		
"When I Had a Uniform On"	Cole Porter		
"White Woman's Instagram"	Bo Burnham		
"Who's Gonna Fill Their Shoes"	George Jones		
"Who's Next"	Tom Lehrer	lists countries acquiring nuclear weapons	
"The Whole World Lost its Head"	Go-Go's		
"White Boys"	from the musical Hair		
"Why Do the Wrong People Travel"	by Noël Coward from the 1961 musical Sail Away		
"The Windmills of Your Mind"	Michel Legrand, Eddy Marnay, Alan and Marilyn Bergman		
"Wish (Komm Zu Mir)"	from the film Run Lola Run (Thomas D)		
"Wishlist"	Pearl Jam		
"Wonderful World"	Sam Cooke		
"Yakko's World"	from Animaniacs		
"You Are What You Wear"	from American Psycho		
"You Can't Get a Man with a Gun"	from Annie Get Your Gun		
"You're Moving Out Today"	Carole Bayer Sager		
"You're the Top"	Cole Porter		
"You've Seen Harlem at Its Best"	Ethel Waters		
"Zip"	Rodgers and Hart		

== Patter songs ==
Many patter songs fall into this genre such as:

- KoKo's Little list song from The Mikado (see "As Some Day It May Happen" above)
- "Tschaikowsky (and Other Russians)" (Kurt Weill and Ira Gershwin) (see "Tschaikowsky" above)
- "The Major-General's Song" (Gilbert and Sullivan)
- "If You Want a Receipt" from Patience (Gilbert and Sullivan)
