= All Eyes on Me (Bo Burnham song) =

2021 song by Bo Burnham

"All Eyes on Me (Song Only)"

Single by Bo Burnham

from the album Inside (The Songs)
- Released: June 10, 2021
- Genre: Comedy; synth-pop
- Length: 5:02 (album version); 3:32 (single version)
- Label: Attic Bedroom; Imperial; Ingrooves; Mercury
- Songwriter: Bo Burnham
- Producer: Bo Burnham

Bo Burnham singles chronology
"Nerds" (2013)	"All Eyes on Me (Song Only)" (2021)	"All Eyes on Me (The Outtakes Version)" (2022)

Music video
- All Eyes on Me on YouTube

"All Eyes on Me" is a song by American musical comedian Bo Burnham, appearing as the eighteenth song in his 2021 special Bo Burnham: Inside and its soundtrack of the same name. The song discusses Burnham's problems with performing live, in particular performance anxiety, including a spoken interlude where he talks with an imaginary audience. A shortened edit was released as a single on July 2 titled All Eyes on Me (Song Only).

== Composition ==
The song begins with the sound of a disembodied applause (not present in the single version) as Burnham begins the chorus, with a digitally lowered voice, which consists of Burnham telling his "audience" to put their hands up and get out of their seats, displaying his desperation for attention which he hasn't gotten thanks to the pandemic. While also asking them to "pray for me", which according to research scholar Quentin Stuckey, could represent a splitting in Bo's character between the need for attention and the desperation for help or divine intervention as a result of performing alone for so long. This contrasts with "Can't Handle This" from his previous special Make Happy, in which he displays dissatisfaction that he needs to perform. The song contains a one-minute, twenty second spoken interlude, which is cut in the single version. In it, Burnham talks about his decision to stop doing live shows after suffering from panic attacks while touring for what. and Make Happy. He eventually reveals that he intended to begin performing live again, but that it had to be put on hold due to the start of the COVID-19 pandemic.

== Reception ==
The song was nominated for and won a Grammy for Best Song Written for Visual Media.

== Accolades ==
Awards and nominations for "All Eyes on Me"
Organization	Year	Category	Result	Ref.
Grammy Awards	2022	Best Song Written for Visual Media	Won	

== The Outtakes Version ==
"All Eyes on Me (The Outtakes Version)"

Song by Bo Burnham

from the album The Inside Outtakes
- Released: June 2, 2022
- Genre: Comedy; synth-pop
- Length: 2:40
- Label: Attic Bedroom; Imperial; Ingrooves; Mercury
- Songwriter: Bo Burnham
- Producer: Bo Burnham

Bo Burnham singles chronology
"All Eyes on Me (Song Only)" (2021)	"All Eyes on Me (The Outtakes Version)" (2022)

An alternative version of the song was published alongside The Inside Outtakes a year later. It is made up of two different takes of the song; as the song progresses, the two versions overlap. It also contains lines cut from the original.

== Personnel ==
- Bo Burnham – vocals, instruments, composer
- John Greenham – mastering engineer
- Mike Malchicoff – recording engineer

== Charts ==
Weekly chart performance for "All Eyes on Me"
Chart (2021)	Peak position
Canada Hot 100 (Billboard)	63
Global 200 (Billboard)	119
Ireland (IRMA)	30
New Zealand (Recorded Music NZ)	22
Sweden (Sverigetopplistan)	92
UK Singles (Official Charts)	47
US Bubbling Under Hot 100 (Billboard)	2

== Certifications ==
Certifications for "All Eyes on Me"
Region	Certification	Certified units/sales
New Zealand (RMNZ)	Gold	15,000^{‡}
United States (RIAA)	Platinum	1,000,000^{‡}
United Kingdom (BPI)	Silver	200,000^{‡}
^{‡} Sales+streaming figures based on certification alone.
