= Egghead: Or, You Can't Survive on Ideas Alone =

2013 poetry collection by Bo Burnham

- Front cover
- Author: Bo Burnham
- Audio read by: Bo Burnham
- Language: English
- Subject: Poetry
- Publisher: Grand Central Publishing
- Publication date: October 1, 2013
- Publication place: United States
- Pages: 224
- ISBN: 9781455519125

Egghead: Or, You Can't Survive on Ideas Alone is a collection of poetry by comedian Bo Burnham. It was illustrated by Chance Bone and published on October 1, 2013.

== Synopsis ==
Egghead is an illustrated collection of poetry. Alice Jones of The Independent described the poems as "a mixture of the puerile ... and the profound". The Sunday Times's Stephen Armstrong compared the book to the poetry of Spike Milligan or John Lennon. Morning Edition host Steve Inskeep reviewed it as similar to Shel Silverstein in that "it's kind of silly but it's also kind of dark".

An example poem reads:

Little Ashley hung magazine spreads on her wall,
after picking the magazines out in the mall.
Models and actresses, singers and more,
with cleavage and makeup and glamour galore!

All of her heroes were finally nearer.
Her whole room looked perfect — except for the mirror.

— Ashley

== Background ==
Bo Burnham is a musical comedian who first gained attention at the age of 16 from his YouTube videos. Egghead was released in 2013, when he was aged 23; the same year, he was touring with his stand-up show what., which incorporated some of the book's poems. Burnham began writing poetry in a Los Angeles café during the production of his mockumentary series Zach Stone Is Gonna Be Famous. He would spend a few hours each day writing to "clear [his] mind" and later said, "I'd let myself write about whatever I wanted to. I let every page be a completely different story, and then the poetry came out."

Burnham described his poems as "pretty literal", saying that Twitter had created a new "condensed, streamlined language" that forms a "new poetry" among his generation. He said, "I'm bored way too easily; I'm staring at screens half the day; I need to be overstimulated. How will that express itself artistically?" He commented of serious themes in the book, "I shouldn't just include the most cynical, rude part of my mind, the part that looks the coolest to people. I think sincerity is the edgiest thing you can do now."

The book was illustrated by Chance Bone. In the US, Grand Central Publishing released it on October 1, 2013. In the UK, it was released on October 3 by Orion Publishing Group. Burnham read the audiobook version.

== Reception ==
Egghead entered The New York Times Best Seller list. It placed at position 21 in Publishers Weekly's bestseller list of October 14, 2013, in the Hardcover Nonfiction category.
