= Inside (The Songs) =

2021 album by Bo Burnham

Soundtrack album by Bo Burnham
- Released: June 10, 2021
- Recorded: March 2020–May 2021
- Genres: Comedy; synth-pop
- Length: 53:28 (original); 57:01 (alternate)
- Labels: Attic Bedroom; Imperial; Ingrooves; Mercury
- Producer: Bo Burnham

Bo Burnham chronology
what. (2013)	Inside (The Songs) (2021)	The Inside Outtakes (2022)

Singles from Inside (The Songs)
- 1. "All Eyes on Me (Song Only)" Released: July 2, 2021

Professional ratings
Review scores
Source	Rating
AllMusic	4.5/4 stars

Inside (The Songs) (shortened and stylized to INSIDE on streaming platforms) is a soundtrack album by American musical comedian Bo Burnham. Accompanying the film of the same name, each song was written, produced and edited by Burnham alone during the COVID-19 pandemic. Themes include mental health, the pandemic, and the internet.

Inside (The Songs) reached the top ten in the United States, Canada, Denmark, Ireland, New Zealand, Norway, and the United Kingdom. It was the best-selling American comedy album of the year and was certified platinum in the United States. Additionally, a number of individual songs from the special charted. "All Eyes on Me" became the first comedy song to enter the Billboard Global 200 charts.

A deluxe edition featuring outtakes and instrumentals was released on June 3, 2022. It followed The Inside Outtakes, an hour-long compilation of unused material from Inside, including new songs and alternate versions of existing songs.

== Production and release ==
Inside (The Songs) accompanies Bo Burnham's film of the same name. Filmed in his guest house in Los Angeles during the COVID-19 pandemic, Burnham produced Inside by himself—he is credited with the writing, directing, filming and editing. The outtakes for the special say that footage was captured between March 2020 and May 2021. The 90-minute special includes songs, sketches, monologues and clips of Burnham's filming process. Deteriorating mental health, the pandemic, the internet and the absence of an audience are themes throughout Inside.

According to Republic executive Tyler Arnold, he reached out to Burnham a few days after Inside's release, while watching the special, and the album was released a day after the contract was signed. He had been a fan of Burnham's for years and said in August 2021 that he had watched Inside around 10 times. Inside (The Songs) was released on June 10, 2021, through Attic Bedroom, Corp., Imperial Records, Ingrooves, and Republic Records. It is Burnham's first special to receive an album release since what., as Make Happy was never released as an album.

"FaceTime with My Mom (Tonight)" was released as a music video on Netflix's YouTube channel Netflix Is A Joke, on June 1. Four music videos were posted on Bo Burnham's YouTube channel: "Welcome to the Internet" on June 4, "White Woman's Instagram" on June 10, "All Eyes on Me" on June 16, and "That Funny Feeling" on November 27. The song "How the World Works" and the "Unpaid Intern" song and subsequent sketch were uploaded to Netflix Is A Joke on July 23 and July 25, respectively.

An alternate version of "All Eyes on Me", omitting Burnham's speech, was released as a single on July 2 as "All Eyes on Me (Song Only)"; it is also included as an additional track on an alternate version of the full album. Arnold said that this was done due to fans online requesting a song-only version. On July 20, 2021, the day of billionaire Jeff Bezos' flight to space, and July 21, the songs "Bezos I" and "Bezos II" were played a combined total of 1.7 million times, a rise of 21%. The song garnered widespread usage on the video-based social media TikTok.

In September 2021, a physical CD and vinyl copy of the album was announced for a release in December 2021, through Imperial Records and Republic Records. A limited number of CDs were signed. The Recording Industry Association of America gave Platinum certifications to "Bezos I", "All Eyes on Me" and "Welcome to the Internet" and Gold certifications to "Goodbye" and "Look Who's Inside Again".

== Track listing ==
All tracks are written, composed and produced by Bo Burnham.

Disc 1
No.	Title	Length
1.	"Content"	1:36
2.	"Comedy"	5:19
3.	"FaceTime with My Mom (Tonight)"	2:20
4.	"How the World Works"	4:15
5.	"White Woman's Instagram"	4:00
6.	"Unpaid Intern"	0:34
7.	"Bezos I"	0:58
8.	"Sexting"	3:21
9.	"Look Who's Inside Again"	1:23
10.	"Problematic"	3:13
11.	"30"	2:34
Total length:		29:33

Disc 2
No.	Title	Length
1.	"Don't Wanna Know"	1:03
2.	"Shit"	1:18
3.	"All Time Low"	0:54
4.	"Welcome to the Internet"	4:35
5.	"Bezos II"	0:45
6.	"That Funny Feeling"	5:01
7.	"All Eyes on Me"	5:02
8.	"Goodbye"	4:09
9.	"Any Day Now"	0:57
Total length:		23:44

Alternate version
No.	Title	Length
1.	"All Eyes on Me (Song Only)"	3:32
Total length:		27:16

== Charts ==
=== Weekly charts ===
Weekly chart performance for Inside (The Songs)
Chart (2021)	Peak position
Australian Albums (ARIA)	95
Austrian Albums (Ö3 Austria)	35
Belgian Albums (Ultratop Flanders)	14
Belgian Albums (Ultratop Wallonia)	161
Canadian Albums (Billboard)	6
Danish Albums (Hitlisten)	8
Dutch Albums (Album Top 100)	14
Finnish Albums (Suomen virallinen lista)	41
German Albums (Offizielle Top 100)	57
Irish Albums (Official Charts)	4
Lithuanian Albums (AGATA)	16
New Zealand Albums (RMNZ)	6
Norwegian Albums (VG-lista)	5
Scottish Albums (Official Charts)	32
Swedish Albums (Sverigetopplistan)	22
Swiss Albums (Schweizer Hitparade)	97
UK Albums (Official Charts)	5
UK Independent Albums (Official Charts)	2
US Billboard 200	7
US Independent Albums (Billboard)	18
US Top Comedy Albums (Billboard)	1

=== Year-end charts ===
Year-end chart performance for Inside (The Songs)
Chart (2021)	Position
UK Albums (OCC)	85
US Billboard 200	132
US Top Comedy Albums (Billboard)	1

== Certifications ==
Region	Certification	Certified units/sales
Denmark (IFPI Danmark)	Gold	10,000^{‡}
United Kingdom (BPI)	Gold	100,000^{‡}
United States (RIAA)	Platinum	1,000,000^{‡}
^{‡} Sales+streaming figures based on certification alone.

== Phoebe Bridgers cover ==
Phoebe Bridgers performed a song from the special, "That Funny Feeling", with Burnham as part of an unannounced appearance at Largo at the Coronet on August 4, 2021. Following this, she began performing the song as an encore on her 2021 tour for Punisher. On October 1, 2021, Bridgers released a cover of the song on Bandcamp with all proceeds going to Texas abortion funds, in response to Texas' anti-abortion legislation. Three days later, it was released on other streaming services. In its first four days, Billboard measured that it received 540,000 online streams and 10,800 downloads, placing it at number 2 on its Rock & Alternative Digital Song Sales and Alternative Digital Song Sales charts, and number 4 on the Digital Song Sales survey.

== The Inside Outtakes ==
The Inside Outtakes

Soundtrack album (reissue) by Bo Burnham
- Released: June 3, 2022
- Recorded: March 2020 – May 2021
- Genres: Comedy; synth-pop
- Length: 23:21
- Labels: Attic Bedroom; Imperial; Ingrooves; Republic
- Producer: Bo Burnham

Bo Burnham chronology
Inside (The Songs) (2021)	The Inside Outtakes (2022)	Inside (Deluxe) (2022)

On May 30, 2022, Burnham marked the one-year anniversary of the special by releasing the hour-long The Inside Outtakes via YouTube. The piece shows behind-the-scenes takes, alternate versions of each song and scene in Inside, and insight into the production process, along with a large number of original songs. The soundtrack for the outtakes was released on June 3, 2022. The special was released on Netflix on August 11, 2022. The songs “1985” and “Microwave Popcorn” are not in the special in their entirety, but clips of Burnham recording vocals for the songs are featured.

=== Track listing ===
All tracks are written by Bo Burnham

No.	Title	Length
1.	"Bezos III"	1:25
2.	"The Future"	1:33
3.	"WTFIGO"	0:54
4.	"1985"	2:26
5.	"Feel Good"	0:43
6.	"Five Years"	3:48
7.	"Biden"	0:51
8.	"Microwave Popcorn"	2:27
9.	"Bezos IV"	0:38
10.	"Spider"	0:35
11.	"This Isn't a Joke"	1:12
12.	"All Eyes on Me (The Outtakes Version)"	2:40
13.	"The Chicken"	4:09
Total length:		23:21

=== Charts ===
Chart performance for The Inside Outtakes
Chart (2022)	Peak position
Irish Albums (IRMA)	67
UK Albums (Official Charts)	68
US Top Comedy Albums (Billboard)	10

== Inside (Deluxe) ==
Inside (Deluxe)

Soundtrack album by Bo Burnham
- Released: June 3, 2022
- Recorded: 2020–2021
- Genres: Comedy; synth-pop
- Length: 90:14; 16:11 (score only)
- Labels: Attic Bedroom; Imperial; Ingrooves; Republic
- Producer: Bo Burnham

Bo Burnham chronology
The Inside Outtakes (2022)	Inside (Deluxe) (2022)

A deluxe album entitled Inside (Deluxe), containing songs and the score from the original special and the outtakes, was announced with the upload of the outtakes and was released on June 3, 2022. On August 10, 2022, a vinyl edition of the album was announced.

=== Track listing ===
The compilation Inside (Deluxe) is divided into four discs digitally: discs one and two consist of Inside (The Songs), with Disc 3 containing The Inside Outtakes and Disc 4 featuring the instrumental scores and interstitials from both specials.

All tracks are written by Bo Burnham.

Disc 4
No.	Title	Length
1.	"The Inside Waltz"	1:20
2.	"Brand Consultant"	1:52
3.	"Looking Back"	0:53
4.	"Knife"	0:40
5.	"Window Washer"	0:52
6.	"Video Game"	2:56
7.	"Sleep"	0:56
8.	"Jeans"	0:44
9.	"Be Yourself"	1:12
10.	"Peanut Butter"	1:24
11.	"Camera"	0:33
12.	"Triggered"	0:50
13.	"The ICU"	1:59
Total length:		16:11

=== Charts ===
Chart performance for Inside (Deluxe)
Chart (2022)	Peak position
New Zealand Albums (RMNZ)	34
