= What. =

what.

Live album by Bo Burnham
- Released: December 17, 2013
- Genre: Comedy
- Length: 1:15:56
- Label: Comedy Central Records
- Producers: Bo Burnham, Christopher Storer

Bo Burnham chronology
Words, Words, Words (2010)	what. (2013)	Inside (The Songs) (2021)

what. is a 2013 stand-up comedy routine and third album by American comedian and musician Bo Burnham. It is his first show following his 2010 comedy special Words Words Words. Like the majority of Burnham's live work, the show consists of musical comedy, prop comedy, miming, observational jokes, and the inversion of established comedy clichés. It received positive reviews.

The live performance debuted at the Regency Ball Room in San Francisco on December 17, 2013, while the album is derived from a live performance of the same set at the Barrymore Theatre in Madison, Wisconsin. In addition to the live performance, the album has five studio tracks: "Repeat Stuff", "Eff", "Nerds", "Channel 5: The Musical", and "Hell of a Ride". Unlike the other tracks, "Repeat Stuff" was performed during the live show (as a piano-only version) and was later released as a single with a music video. what. was released on YouTube and Netflix on December 17, 2013, and the album was released via iTunes the next day.

== Synopsis ==
The taped show begins with home video footage of a pre-adolescent Bo Burnham singing "Old MacDonald Had a Farm" before cutting to the live event.

A disembodied robotic voice introduces and insults Bo's appearance and character as he sits backstage in a hoodie looking down, and claims that he has isolated himself while making this routine, becoming insane. Upbeat instrumental hip-hop music begins to play as Bo energetically springs to life and dances around the stage, while his prerecorded voice sings welcoming the viewer, explaining that this whole performance is a contractual obligation, and giving Bo a variety of miming instructions such as "Bo takes off his pants like this!", wherein Bo takes off his pants to seamlessly reveal another pair underneath, all synced to the music. After several short mimed musical sketches, it tells the audience that the song is going to end and welcomes them to the real show.

Speaking for the first time, Bo welcomes his San Francisco audience and asks the male audience members if they "hate it when you're blowing a guy and he turns out to be a faggot." He awkwardly knocks over his water bottle but a prerecorded track plays right after, singing "He meant to knock the water over!"—the track then plays again, interrupting Bo's next joke as he laments the sound department error—before a third track plays singing "He meant to play the water track again!". After brief poop jokes and piano key mashing, Bo sings "Sad" about several depressing and ironic scenarios, quickly turning into hysteria as he proclaims that laughter is the key to fixing these problems, and thus maniacally sings about how funny concepts like the Holocaust are. He then announces "a really good joke about video editors", and in the taped version, there is a sudden jump cut to the next segment cutting him off. Bo reads "I Fuck Sluts", satirising the objectification of women, and then mouths a pun in a prerecorded slow-mo voice to appease those in the audience "who can't keep up". He throws glitter out of his pocket while refuting that he is flamboyant, and then hypes up a song called "What Did I Do Last Night" with spectacle stage lighting, which consists of the single line "I cried myself to sleep." Bo ridicules homophobia, before a disembodied robotic voice critiques his overthinking and emotional dysregulation, ultimately deciding to split the two sides of his mind as blaring stage lights flash. In the song "Left Brain, Right Brain", the two argue over how to control Bo at odds with each other, with Bo, the person, acting them out as two different characters. When the robot voice returns to merge Bo back together, the two agree to work together from now on and wish each other farewell as they are about to lose their autonomy.

Bo sings "#deep", claiming to be profound while making shallow observations, and mimes masturbation in the instrumental song "Beating Off in A Minor". He insists that "showering with five other guys isn't gay", before reading absurd original poetry from his then-upcoming book Egghead. and sings "From God's Perspective", about how arguing about religion is pointless, life on Earth can be Heaven, and "God might not believe in you". A musical cue plays as he walks from the piano to the microphone, where he ridicules misogyny by playing the role of a male sexist who enjoys getting penetrated with a strap-on. He reads out an original children's story about a frog named Andy falling in love, but spontaneously getting violently eaten by a crocodile—then performs wordplay about firefighting, which he immediately insults himself for, and mimes to a prerecorded track about an old man fishing for kids in the park with a candy bar on the end of his line. Bo mentions criticisms of his purported arrogance on-stage, which transitions into him listing various phrases that have supposedly never been said before, such as "I'm your father and I loved your comedy special". He briefly slips out of his stage persona to genuinely thank the audience, then sings "Repeat Stuff", which criticises modern love songs for psychologically manipulating teenage girls and having mindless lyrics.

Bo thanks the audience for coming out and announces the conclusion of the routine, but he is surprised to be interrupted by the disembodied voices of a woman he knew in highschool, a pretentious business agent, and a stranger who harasses him for being arrogant, who Bo reacts to with three consistent presences and locations on the stage. While initially intimidated, Bo is able to gain control of the disembodied voices and creates a melody of the repeated words "We think… we know… you", which he is able to create a backing track for by miming instruments—this makes up the finale song "We Think We Know You".

In the taped version, the audio of a pre-adolescent Bo in a home video plays over the credits.

== Background ==
Burnham rose to fame for posting songs on his YouTube page with satirical, funny, and offensive slants. He signed to Comedy Central Records and released his debut EP, Bo fo Sho, in 2008. He released his debut album, Bo Burnham, in 2009. He toured extensively during this time, gathering material for his first official Comedy Central stand-up hour. Words Words Words was recorded in 2010 at the House of Blues in Boston and received acclaim. Burnham later published a New York Times Best Selling book of poetry titled Egghead: Or, You Can't Survive on Ideas Alone and wrote and starred in the mockumentary series Zach Stone Is Gonna Be Famous on MTV.

Burnham spent three years writing what., which was released on YouTube and Netflix for free on December 17, 2013, with money Burnham made from touring used to finance the special. The YouTube video has over 25 million views as of July 2024. Burnham experienced 12 panic attacks while touring for what. but had never had panic attacks prior to this. It influenced the writing of his next stand-up performance, Make Happy (2016), after which he quit live comedy until returning with Inside (2021).

== Album ==
what. was released by Comedy Central Records as a download on both Amazon and the iTunes Store on December 17, 2013. The album features five new studio songs: "Repeat Stuff", "Eff", "Nerds", "Channel 5: The Musical", and "Hell of a Ride". Unlike the other tracks, "Repeat Stuff" was performed during the live show (as a piano-only version) and was later released as a single with a music video which has gained over 16 million YouTube views as of October 2021.

=== Track listing ===
No.	Title	Length
1.	"Intro"	9:29
2.	"Sad"	4:23
3.	"I F--k Sl--ts"	3:21
4.	"WDIDLN?"	1:56
5.	"Left Brain, Right Brain"	6:34
6.	"#deep"	4:04
7.	"Beating Off in A Minor"	2:30
8.	"Poems"	3:27
9.	"From God's Perspective"	4:21
10.	"Andy the Frog"	3:13
11.	"Out of the Abyss"	3:40
12.	"Repeat Stuff"	5:21
13.	"We Think We Know You"	6:54
14.	"Repeat Stuff" (Studio)	4:58
15.	"Eff" (Studio)	2:50
16.	"Nerds" (Studio)	3:26
17.	"Channel 5: The Musical" (Studio)	4:32
18.	"Hell of a Ride" (Studio)	4:24
Total length:		1:15:56

== Reception ==
Reception to what. has been positive. Mark Monahan of The Telegraph writes, "If his Edinburgh debut was more impressive than it was laugh-out-loud funny, this lightning-fast, constantly wrong-footing, even more ambitious follow-up is supremely both", and gave the show 5 out of 5 stars. Brian Logan of The Guardian gave the show 4 out of 5 stars, describing it as a "full-frontal assault of music and meta-comedy that leaves you gasping for air", with "not a line out of place, nor one that isn't in there for destabilising comic effect", though Logan noted that "Burnham's comedy has a depressive streak, and his material is often base". Another writer in The Guardian summarised the show by writing, "Burnham mixes the utterly base with the sophisticated, meshing hip-hop-influenced songs that reference Shakespeare, and feature plenty of dick jokes." Jason Zinoman of the New York Times writes that the show has a "manic satirical style", which is "ambitious, and sometimes inspired" but contains "a tension at the core of this show that remains unresolved".

== Chart positions ==
what. debuted on the Billboard Comedy Albums chart at position #2, on January 4, 2014, peaking at #1 on January 18, 2014, and remaining on the chart for 77 weeks. It was on the Independent Albums chart for 4 weeks, peaking at position #31. what. had first week sales of 10,000 copies.
