= Bo Burnham: Inside =

2021 comedy special by Bo Burnham

- Promotional release poster
- Directed by: Bo Burnham
- Written by: Bo Burnham
- Produced by: Josh Senior
- Starring: Bo Burnham
- Cinematography: Bo Burnham
- Edited by: Bo Burnham
- Music by: Bo Burnham
- Distributed by: Netflix
- Release date: May 30, 2021
- Running time: 87 minutes
- Country: United States
- Language: English

Bo Burnham: Inside is a 2021 musical special written, directed, filmed, edited, and performed by American comedian Bo Burnham. Created alone by Burnham in the guest house of his Los Angeles home during the COVID-19 pandemic, it was released on Netflix on May 30, 2021. Featuring a variety of songs and sketches about his day-to-day life indoors, it depicts Burnham's deteriorating mental health, explores themes of performativity and his relationship to the Internet and the audience it helped him reach, and addresses topics such as climate change and social movements. Other segments discuss online activities such as FaceTiming one's mother, posting on Instagram, sexting, and livestreaming video games.

Inside follows Burnham's previous stand-up comedy special Make Happy (2016), which led him to quit performing as he began to experience panic attacks onstage during that special's tour. An album of songs from the special, Inside (The Songs), was released digitally on June 10, 2021. On the first anniversary of the special's release, Burnham uploaded The Inside Outtakes, an hour-long YouTube video of outtakes, unused songs, behind-the-scenes footage, and alternate takes from the special. A deluxe album including these outtakes, Inside (Deluxe), was released on June 3, 2022.

The special was widely praised, particularly for its music, direction, cinematography, editing, and presentation of life during the COVID-19 pandemic. Critics found that the special incorporates a variety of art forms including music, stand-up comedy bits, and meta-commentary, describing it as some combination of comedy, drama, documentary, and theater. For Inside, Burnham received a Peabody Award, Emmy Awards for Outstanding Directing for a Variety Special, Outstanding Music Direction, and Outstanding Writing for a Variety Special, and the Grammy Award for Best Song Written for Visual Media for "All Eyes On Me".

== Background ==
Bo Burnham is an American musical comedian who rose to fame by posting videos on YouTube from 2006 onwards. After these songs were adapted into his debut self-titled album (2009), he performed three stand-up tours, the first two of which were released as albums and the last one as a recorded performance: Words Words Words (2010), what. (2013), and Make Happy (2016). During the tour for Make Happy, Burnham began to have panic attacks onstage. In the intervening years, he wrote and directed Eighth Grade (2018) and starred in Promising Young Woman (2020).

== Synopsis ==
Four stills from the film, (left to right and top to bottom) depicting the mock reaction video and anti-suicide talk, and images from the songs "All Eyes On Me" and "Goodbye".

Burnham enters a small, spare room. All subsequent events are depicted in the single room, with his hair and beard growing throughout. In the song "Content", he apologizes for his hiatus and clarifies that he is unable to leave his home. This is followed by "Comedy", where an ethereal voice commands Burham that the dire state of the world can only be saved by a white male comedian. Addressing the viewer, he apologizes for the incongruent and fast-paced nature of the special, and expresses the intent to keep himself busy while making the viewer happy.

After "FaceTime with My Mom (Tonight)", he addresses the "kids" watching in a song about nature, but a sock puppet character named Socko begins singing about historical genocide and worker exploitation—this makes up "How the World Works". A parody of a brand consultant is succeeded by "White Woman's Instagram", mocking Instagram tropes. The brief song "Unpaid Intern" is immediately followed by a mock reaction video, but the film continues playing in the superimposed video, making Burnham react to a loop of his own commentary. This is followed by "Bezos I", disingenuously praising Jeff Bezos, "Sexting", and a parody of a YouTuber's "thank you" video while holding a knife. The song "Look Who's Inside Again", in the third-person, mocks an individual who was looking for an excuse to isolate themselves and got what they wanted. He apologizes for problematic behavior from the past that he regrets in "Problematic".

He speaks to the viewer minutes before his 30th birthday, revealing that he had hoped to finish the special before this date. This is followed by "30", ending with an abrupt admission that he will commit suicide when he is 40. In the immediate next scene, he urges the viewer not to kill themselves. Halfway through this anti-suicide talk, the scene cuts to this footage being projected onto a future Burnham, who watches disinterestedly. Burnham in the talk then begins to admit he would die temporarily if he could.

In an intermission, Burnham cleans the camera. He rhetorically asks the viewer what they think of the special in "Don't Wanna Know". Parodying a video game streamer, he provides commentary on a game that consists of himself crying in his room. This is followed by descriptions of his mental health in the ironically upbeat "Shit" and "All Time Low". In "Welcome to the Internet", he acts as a malign tour guide of the Internet, offering to the viewer diverse types of content, ranging from upbeat to morbid, to engage with endlessly. After "Bezos II", incongruous images of modern society are listed in "That Funny Feeling". He attempts to tell the viewer that he has been working on the special for a year, but gets overwhelmed and strikes his equipment before breaking down in tears. In "All Eyes On Me", Burnham sings for a pre-recorded track of an audience: he reveals that he stepped away from live comedy five years prior because he was suffering panic attacks onstage; his mental health had improved enough by January 2020 for him to consider returning before "the funniest thing happened". The song instructs the audience to get up; hold their hands up; and pray for him. Angry with the viewer, he picks up the camera and dances with it before dropping it on the ground.

A worn-out Burnham says that he is "done". In "Goodbye", he vows to never go outside again; footage of Burham singing with both a cropped and long beard and hair is played simultaneously. A montage shows him setting up the room for various scenes in the special, and he incorporates lyrics from previous songs. The final shot of the song shows him caught in a spotlight naked. After the song, Burnham is shown finally leaving the room, only to be locked out as an unseen audience applauds and then laughs at him for attempting to get back inside. Back in the room, he watches footage of this on his projector and begins to smile. The song "Any Day Now" plays over the end credits, consisting of a stripped-down melody and the repeated lyrics "it'll stop any day now".

== Production ==
Inside was filmed in the guest house of the Los Angeles home Burnham shared with his long-time girlfriend, filmmaker Lorene Scafaria, before they moved to a different property a few months after the release of the special; the guest house was also used for filming the end of Make Happy. A Zillow listing later revealed that the property is the same one that was used to film A Nightmare on Elm Street (1984). Burnham said that due to the COVID-19 pandemic, he worked on the show alone without a crew or audience. The outtakes for the special say that footage was captured between March 2020 and May 2021. A Netflix executive—Robbie Praw—said that Burnham contacted him "fairly early in the pandemic" about Inside, and sent him 20 minutes of footage towards the end of 2020.

According to a leak supplied to Bloomberg News in October 2021, Netflix paid $3.9 million for Inside, and assigned it an internal "efficiency" value of 2.8, against a baseline score of 1 for content that breaks even; the Netflix spokesperson who provided the statistics for Inside and several other programs on the streaming service was later fired for releasing confidential and "commercially sensitive information".

== Release ==
Burnham announced Inside on April 28, 2021, along with a small trailer that showed a clean-cut Burnham during the ending of Make Happy, which transitioned into a scene from Inside that featured his long-haired and bearded look. He also posted on both Twitter and Instagram. On May 21, he announced that Inside was to be released on May 30. The special was released without a press kit or a collection of stills. It was shown in select theaters in the United States between July 22 and July 25, 2021, with certain theaters adding showings after the initial weekend had passed.

== Inside (The Songs) ==
As announced on June 8, 2021, music from Inside was released as Inside (The Songs) on June 10 on music streaming platforms through Republic Records. Inside (The Songs) reached the top ten in the United States, Canada, Denmark, Ireland, New Zealand, Norway, and the United Kingdom. It was the best-selling American comedy album of the year and was certified platinum in the United States for sales of over 1,000,000 units. Additionally, a number of individual songs from the special charted. "All Eyes On Me" became the first comedy song to enter the Billboard Global 200 charts.

== The Inside Outtakes ==
On May 30, 2022, Burnham marked the first anniversary of the special by premiering the hour-long The Inside Outtakes via YouTube. He announced that he would be posting the video one hour beforehand. The video was edited by Burnham from April to May 2022. The outtakes were also released on Netflix on August 11, 2022.

The Inside Outtakes shows behind-the-scenes takes, alternate versions of each song and scene in Inside, and insight into the production process. It features 13 new songs, including alternate versions of "All Eyes On Me" and "Look Who's Inside Again", and short songs "Bezos III"; "Bezos IV"; and "Spider". "The Future" contrasts Burnham's desires to have a daughter and effectively meditate with his unhappy reality. "Five Years" celebrates a relationship anniversary, and has been considered to be both a parody of Drake's songs and a reference to Burnham's relationship with Lorene Scafaria. "Biden" is about his reluctance to vote for Joe Biden in the 2020 United States presidential election. Auto-Tune-heavy "This Isn't a Joke" deviates to the topic of Burnham's birth scar. "The Chicken" dramatizes the scenario of the question "why did the chicken cross the road?" It also includes other unused material, such as a podcast satirizing The Joe Rogan Experience and a parody of the Marvel Cinematic Universe (MCU). The video itself references YouTube's advertisement system, including a countdown to adverts ("Ad in 5"), Inside-styled web banners, and fake video recommendations.

Some of the outtakes evoke songs or themes included in the final special—for instance, Mitchell Clark of The Verge compared "The Future" to "Problematic" due to the songs sharing a similar melody, with both songs sharing themes of depression and being stuck inside. Brian Logan of The Guardian reviewed that though some outtakes were only for fans of Inside, "some of the material sparkles as brightly as the best of the original", including the podcast, "Five Years" and "Chicken". The Big Issue's Evie Breese, though less fond of "Chicken", praised the songs in the outtakes for their "mental claustrophobia", which continues to be relevant after the end of lockdowns.

The Daily Beast's Matt Wilstein praised that the podcast scene felt "more relevant in 2022", with its satire of podcasters like Joe Rogan who talk "about censorship while broadcasting to tens of millions of listeners every day", and ironic moments like an advert for "Manstuff's Dick Spray" appearing when the podcaster calls himself a "philosopher". Similarly, The Mary Sue's Vivian Kane praised that the scene showed that anti-"woke" or anti-"cancel culture" comedians use "thinly or not-at-all veiled bigotry" while "demanding reverence". Kane wrote that "the best takedown possible is just essentially repeating a bigot's own words and general ethos verbatim".

Following the special, a line of merchandise themed around the MCU parody sketch was released. The website's homepage and product descriptions are satirical, including such passages as "All you need to do is what we are calling 'BUY' this what we are calling 'WEARABLE CONTENT' with what we are calling 'YOUR MONEY.'"

== Analysis ==
=== Tone and format ===
Though often described as a comedy special, Inside tackles controversial and serious subject matter, with mental health and its deterioration being the most prevalent theme. Brian Logan of The Guardian called it a "comedy Gesamtkunstwerk"—a piece of art combining many forms. Tom Power of TechRadar wrote that it was a "comedy-drama" and its alternation between stand-up material, music and "fly-on-the-wall" scenes makes it feel like the combination of "a documentary and stage act". Similarly, in Vulture, Kathryn VanArendonk said that it "longs to be a concert" in some places and in others approaches "confessional" or "journalistic" styles. In contrast, NPR reviewer Linda Holmes saw it as "not a documentary but an exceptionally well-written piece of theater". Some parts of the special lack humor, while many jokes are met with silence. Both Holmes and The New Yorker's Rachel Syme analyzed that, of the limited traditional comedy in the special, the punchlines feel out of place: Syme stated that they "feel deliberately hackneyed and out-of-date" and Holmes explained that Burnham felt "it makes no sense without an audience to laugh at it". There is meta-humor and footage of Burnham editing the special and viewing one of his previous videos. Eric Kohn of IndieWire identified "weird tonal shifts and abrupt transitions" between different sections of the special, and VanArendonk described Burnham as displaying "performance energy across a wide spectrum of affects and moods".

Power suggested that the setting of a single room is representative of Burnham's mind, explaining that "scattered instruments, clothes and recording equipment signify the cluttered, messy and overwhelming thoughts he has to deal with on a daily basis". On a related note, Jason Zinoman said in The New York Times that the title has a double meaning, referring to Burnham being inside a single room, and "also his head". Karl Quinn of The Sydney Morning Herald wrote that Inside employs the limited setting "as a canvas for creativity", but the overall feeling is "claustrophobia and cloying ennui", and even "full-blown depression". Power stated that Burnham "struggles with his solitary confinement" and "gradually loses his grip on reality"; VanArendonk pointed out that Burnham's growing beard and hair reflect this trajectory. Writing in The Independent, Isobel Lewis saw that "the more he opens up, the more heightened the artifice" he employs, and concluded that this is a method of coping with despair.

Reviewers drew parallels to various other works. A stand-up comedy routine by Maria Bamford, "The Special Special Special" (2012), was filmed in her house with her parents as the audience, similar to Burnham's filming constraints of one room and no audience. Staged (2020), a British television comedy set during the COVID-19 pandemic in the UK, stars Michael Sheen and David Tennant as fictionalized versions of themselves attempting to rehearse a stage play solely via video calls during lockdown; The A.V. Club's Allison Shoemaker found that both Inside and Staged presented pandemic life as having a surreal quality. Isobel Lewis of The Independent said that Inside is "largely about comedy itself" and explores Burnham's "complex relationship with his audience", similar to Hannah Gadsby in their stand-up set Nanette (2017). Den of Geek's Bojalad drew tonal connections to A Heartbreaking Work of Staggering Genius (2000), a Dave Eggers memoir that portrays "the confusing, oft exhilarating human experience" through Eggers' experience of having to raise his younger brother after their parents died of cancer. The song "Unpaid Intern" and subsequent reaction video is similar to the sketch "Pre-Taped Call-In Show" from the Bob Odenkirk and David Cross sketch show Mr. Show with Bob and David (1995–1998), but Burnham further uses the recursive format as a way to portray his insecurities. IndieWire's Eric Kohn said that like Burnham's film Eighth Grade, the focus is on "the dangerous allure of shutting the world out in an era of on-demand distractions"; Lewis stated that it was like some of Burnham's older material, such as the music video to "Words, Words, Words" (2010), in the "effort put into every rapidly changing shot". Several other publications drew comparisons of Burnham's lyrical content and appearance to those of musician Father John Misty.

=== Themes ===
NPR's Linda Holmes said that there are blurred lines between "truth and fiction" in the special. In The Daily Beast, Kevin Fallon asked, "What is performance and what is voyeuristic when the pain we're watching is almost uncomfortably real?" He also suggested that not being able to distinguish may be intentional. Matthew Dessem of Slate saw the main subject as "Burnham's relationship to his own work, and that work's irrelevance in the face of global collapse". On this topic, Kohn described that Burnham's "maniacal, passive-aggressive screen presence suggests he's grown cynical about creating art in a world that reduces it to pure capitalist product". Some reviewers noticed recurring imagery of Burnham as Jesus, with long unkempt hair and a growing beard. Bojalad analyzed the special as "one entertainer beating his own ego to death"; in contrast, TechRadar's Tom Power said that though Burnham is "leading us through" the "deeply personal" work, "it's hard not to see yourself in Burnham's place". Holmes stated that it would be familiar to many people who lived through the pandemic that there is a "balance" between "two impulses": one to "stay in bed ... alone", and the other to "create, stay busy, and make jokes".

Performativity and Burnham's relationship to his audience are key to the special. This follows on from Make Happy (2016), in which the closing stage song "Can't Handle This (Kanye Rant)" reflected his ambivalent relationship with his audience. After the stage section of Make Happy ends, Burnham performs "Are You Happy?" in the same guest house used in Inside and then leaves to join his girlfriend Lorene Scafaria and their dog in the garden. Dessem commented that the filming style creates "contrast between the austere demands of creative work and the vibrant life going on outside". Power wrote that Inside is a "continuation" and "extension" of these themes from Make Happy. VanArendonk identified "endless loops of performance and consumption, worrying about performativity and authenticity and productivity". Through the final scene, in which Burnham watches a recording of himself locked outside while still in the room, Zinoman saw Inside as "encouraging skepticism of the performativity" of "realism".

The internet is a major topic in the special, which explicitly depicts media such as Instagram grids and Twitch livestreams. Zinoman believed it was the "dominant subject", as the pandemic increased the importance of "digital life", and that Burnham demonstrated a "harsh skepticism" towards it: according to Zinoman, "the incentives of the web, those that reward outrage, excess and sentiment" are cast as "the villains". Bojalad contextualized Burnham as having a "fraught relationship with technology and social media" since his career began with a series of YouTube videos posted before social media "became something far more corporate and sinister". Rebecca Reid of The Daily Telegraph saw Burnham as not "demonising" or "evangelising" about the internet, and instead "capturing the silliness, the horrors, the brilliance and the total futility".

=== Individual songs ===
Bojalad and Reid analyzed a verse in "White Woman's Instagram" about the character's emotions over the past death of her mother. The majority of the song is "a satirical tune about all the shallow and clout-chasing images that pop up on basic white women's Instagram accounts", according to Bojalad. It uses a narrow frame to mimic a cell phone screen—as did the earlier song "FaceTime with My Mom (Tonight)"—but as the character talks about her mother's death, the frame expands to full size. Reid saw this as a reflection of a young person's life on social media: "Vapid, inane rubbish ... interspersed with occasional moments of boundary-breaking honesty and observation." Bojalad commented that Instagram can be performative, and as with Burnham's own performativity, "sometimes real sneaks itself through".

Gabrielle Sanchez of The A.V. Club reviewed "Problematic". She compared Inside with Burnham's earliest YouTube videos and found many similarities in performance style; however, he made "blatantly unfunny, homophobic, and misogynistic jokes" in his early career. Sanchez said that "Problematic" serves a dual purpose of apologizing for this content and satirizing "the current cycle of celebrity call-outs and apologies". Burnham initially uses his young age as an excuse, but then apologizes for doing so in the next verse: Sanchez argued that the message is that "the first step to being a better person is acknowledging mistakes".

== Reception ==
=== Critical response ===
On the review aggregator website Rotten Tomatoes, 95% of 55 critics' reviews are positive, with an average rating of 9.2/10. The website's consensus reads: "A claustrophobic masterclass in comedy and introspection, Inside is a beautifully bleak, hilariously hopeful special from Bo Burnham." On Metacritic, the special has a weighted average score of 96 out of 100 based on nine critics. It received five out of five from The Guardian, The Times, and The Sydney Morning Herald. IndieWire gave it an A− rating. The A.V. Club included the program in its 2023 list of the 30 best stand-up specials in history. Adrian Horton of The Guardian named "All Eyes On Me" one of her favorite songs of 2021.

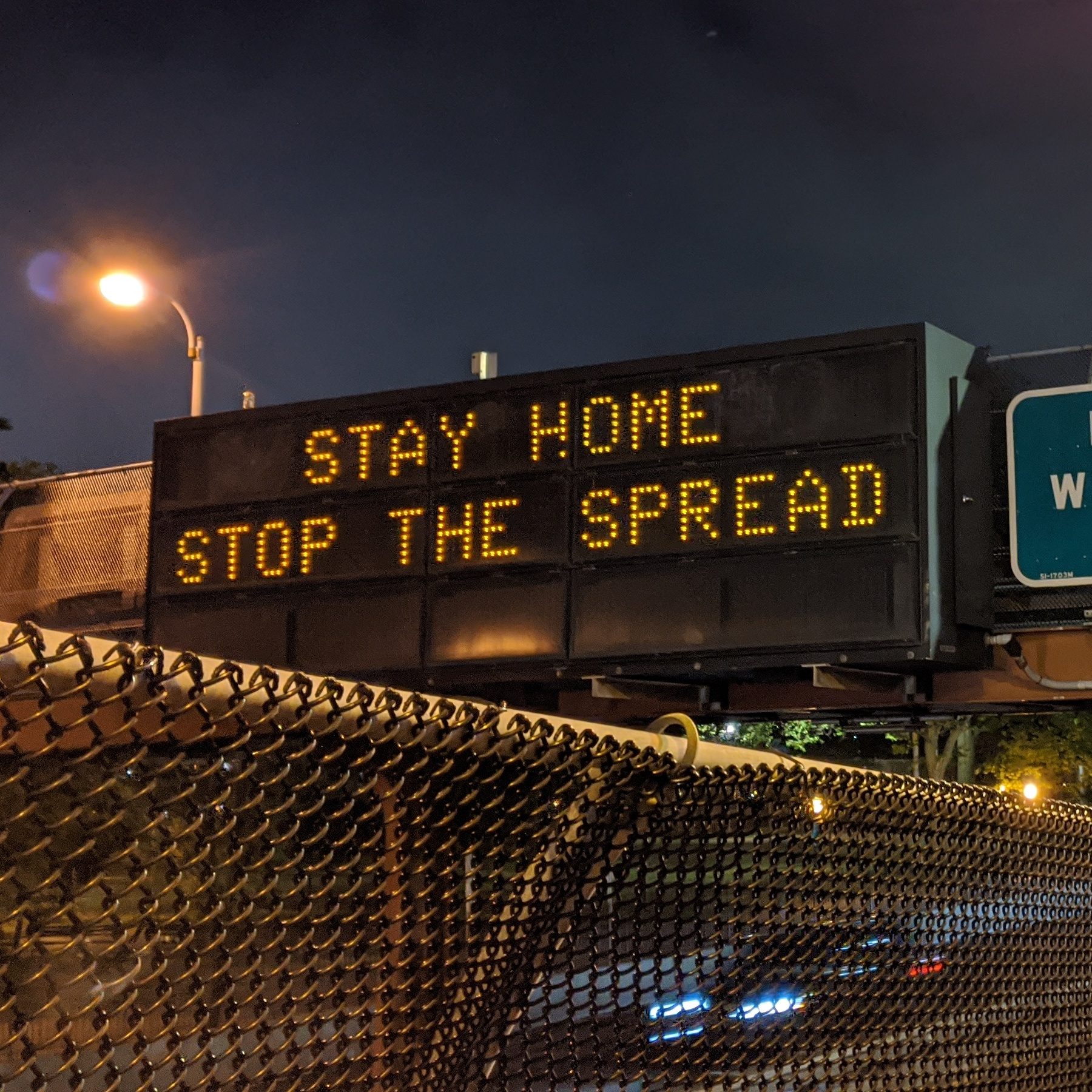
Reviewers praised the special as accurately depicting features of the COVID-19 pandemic.

Critics lauded the special's presentation of the COVID-19 pandemic, which is never mentioned by name. Dominic Maxwell of The Times called it "the first comic masterpiece" from the era and Bojalad thought that it could be "a definitive bit of Western popular art to come out" from it. Slate's Matthew Dessem wrote that it was "one of the most sincere artistic responses to the 21st century so far" and Quinn considered that it could be "the essential document" of the period. Kevin Fallon of The Daily Beast had not enjoyed other media made or set during the pandemic, but found Inside "the perfect punctuation on the grand quarantine TV experiment". Similarly, The A.V. Club's Allison Shoemaker described it as one of a small number of works that are an "effective and accurately surreal encapsulation" of pandemic life, and Power reviewed it as "culturally relevant and thematically resonant". Lewis identified its surrealism as what made it fit the cultural consciousness of the pandemic, saying that it left the viewer with a feeling of claustrophobia. Fallon said that other shows about the pandemic were "indulgent, patronizing, or mostly meaningless", but Inside has "an authenticity to its very intimate, very personal approach". Den of Geek's Alec Bojalad further argued that the film has a "timeless quality". Rachel Syme of The New Yorker viewed it as portraying specifically the "unmoored, wired, euphoric, listless" experience of being online during the pandemic with "a frenzied and dextrous clarity". Due to Burnham's practical constraints, The New York Times's Jason Zinoman believed it evidences that limitations are the best form of inspiration.

Burnham was critically acclaimed for his filmmaking and acting. Power saw Inside "unique in its approach, content and subjectivity". Vulture's Kathryn VanArendonk lauded Burnham's directing, writing and performing and Bojalad described it as the best work of Burnham's career to date. Fallon said that Burnham's "chameleonic abilities" make the special work, while Shoemaker reviewed the filmmaking as "inherently and marvelously theatrical" and the performance as vulnerable. Lewis found Burnham's comedy and emotions were relatable. Zinoman commented that Burnham anticipated potential criticisms of the show as "indulgently overheated" with dialogue such as "Self-awareness does not absolve anyone of anything".

According to Zinoman, Burnham utilized facets of cinematography that are overlooked by other comedians. Power summarized that the angle and scope of shots, the editing and scene transitions, and the lighting effects combine to evoke "a fever dream". Kohn viewed the special as making "pitch-perfect gallows humor" from its musicality and visuals. Both Kohn and Shoemaker compared Inside favorably to Eighth Grade, with Kohn saying that it was "a happy medium between the silly-strange nature of his stage presence and the advanced storytelling instincts evident from Eighth Grade", and Shoemaker opining that it combined "the remarkable filmmaking skill" of the movie with "his usual sharply comedic pop tunes".

Zinoman praised Burnham for showcasing a wider variety of musical styles than his previous specials, including bebop, synth-pop and show tunes, as well as becoming "as meticulous and creative with his visual vocabulary as his language". Power wrote that the songs move quickly from emotion to emotion, and will have the viewer "laughing one minute and experiencing an existential crisis the next". Many critics singled out songs for praise. Bojalad found a verse in "White Woman's Instagram" about the character's mother dying to be the "most remarkable moment of human kindness and empathy" of Inside, experiencing it as an unexpected scene that had stayed with him since his viewing. Zinoman praised the same song as "visually precise and hilarious". Additionally, Kohn praised "How the World Works" as particularly strong, and Holmes praised "Welcome to the Internet" as "one of the best executions of" the "wildness" of being online.

=== Accolades ===
Burnham became the first person to win three Emmys individually (not shared with another person) in a single year: directing, writing, and music direction. After being deemed ineligible for the Best Comedy Album category, Inside was submitted at the Grammy Awards for the Best Compilation Soundtrack for Visual Media award.

Awards and nominations received by Inside
Award	Date of ceremony	Category	Recipient(s)	Result	Ref(s)
Cinema Audio Society Awards	March 19, 2022	Outstanding Achievement in Sound Mixing for Television Non Fiction, Variety or Music – Series or Specials	Bo Burnham and Joel Dougherty	Nominated	
Cinema Eye Honors	March 1, 2022	Heterodox Award	Bo Burnham	Nominated	
Critics' Choice Television Awards	March 13, 2022	Best Comedy Special	Bo Burnham: Inside	Won	
Directors Guild of America Awards	March 12, 2022	Outstanding Directorial Achievement in Variety/Talk/News/Sports – Specials	Bo Burnham	Nominated	
Eddie Awards	March 5, 2022	Best Edited Variety Talk/Sketch Show or Special	Bo Burnham	Won	
Grammy Awards	April 3, 2022	Best Music Film	Bo Burnham and Josh Senior	Nominated	
Grammy Awards	April 3, 2022	Best Song Written for Visual Media	Bo Burnham (for the song "All Eyes On Me")	Won	
Hollywood Critics Association	August 29, 2021	Best Streaming Sketch Series, Variety Series, Talk Show, or Comedy/Variety Special	Bo Burnham: Inside	Won	
Hollywood Critics Association	August 29, 2021	Honorary Virtuoso Award	Bo Burnham	Won	
Hollywood Critics Association	August 14, 2022	Best Comedy or Standup Special	Bo Burnham: The Inside Outtakes	Nominated	
Libera Awards	June 16, 2022	Best Outlier Record	Inside (The Songs)	Nominated	
Hollywood Music in Media Awards	November 17, 2021	Best Original Song – TV Show/Limited Series	Bo Burnham (for the song "Welcome to the Internet")	Nominated	
Hollywood Music in Media Awards	November 17, 2021	Live Concert for a Visual Medium	Bo Burnham	Won	
Peabody Awards	June 9, 2022	Entertainment	Bo Burnham: Inside	Won	
Primetime Emmy Awards	September 11, 2021	Outstanding Picture Editing for Variety Programming	Bo Burnham	Nominated	
Primetime Emmy Awards	September 12, 2021	Outstanding Directing for a Variety Special	Bo Burnham	Won	
Primetime Emmy Awards	September 12, 2021	Outstanding Writing for a Variety Special	Bo Burnham	Won	
Primetime Emmy Awards	September 12, 2021	Outstanding Music Direction	Bo Burnham	Won	
Primetime Emmy Awards	September 12, 2021	Outstanding Original Music and Lyrics	Bo Burnham (for the song "Comedy")	Nominated	
Primetime Emmy Awards	September 19, 2021	Outstanding Variety Special (Pre-Recorded)	Bo Burnham and Josh Senior	Nominated	
Rose d'Or	November 29, 2021	Comedy	Bo Burnham: Inside	Won	
TCA Awards	September 15, 2021	Outstanding Achievement in Movies, Miniseries and Specials	Bo Burnham: Inside	Nominated	
TCA Awards	September 15, 2021	Individual Achievement in Comedy	Bo Burnham	Nominated	
