= Tyler Arnold =

American record executive

- Born: Tyler M. Arnold; July 1992 (age 34); Connecticut, USA
- Education: Suffield Academy; Northeastern University
- Occupations: Record executive; Company president
- Known for: VP of A&R, Republic Records (2020-22); President, Mercury Records (2022-present)

Tyler M. Arnold (born July 1992) is an American record executive who was vice president of A&R for Republic Records from 2020 to 2022, and has been president of Mercury Records since 2022.

He is credited with signing Post Malone, Clairo, Jeremy Zucker, Chelsea Cutler, and Metro Boomin to the company, as well as forming corporate alliances with Big Loud and Imperial Records. He was elected as a part of the 2022 Forbes 30 Under 30.
