= Make Happy =

2016 film by Bo Burnham

- Promotional poster
- Written by: Bo Burnham
- Directed by: Bo Burnham; Chris Storer
- Starring: Bo Burnham
- Music by: Bo Burnham; Alvaro Morello
- Country of origin: United States
- Original language: English

Production
- Producers: Kathy Welch; Chris Scanlon
- Cinematography: Andrew Wehde
- Editor: Chris Amos
- Running time: 60 minutes
- Production companies: 3 Arts Entertainment; Attic Bedroom

Original release
- Network: Netflix
- Release: June 3, 2016

Make Happy is a stand-up comedy routine written and performed by Bo Burnham which he performed live in 2015 and 2016. It was directed by Burnham and Chris Storer and a recording of the show was released on Netflix on June 3, 2016. Similar to Burnham's previous special what., the show is a specifically choreographed performance that combines comedy with music and uses pre-recorded music, stage lighting effects, and sound effects. It has received an overwhelmingly positive critical response, with several critics complimenting Burnham's deconstruction of various types of performances, clever jokes based on misdirection, and his stage persona.

== Background ==
Burnham rose to fame at the age of 16 after posting videos on YouTube beginning in 2006. He signed to Comedy Central Records and released his debut EP, "Bo Fo Sho", in 2008. His most recent work at the time of Make Happy was the stand-up show what., with which he toured in 2013 and released on YouTube and Netflix for free in December 2013. While touring for what., he began to have panic attacks before shows, which may have influenced the writing and performance of Make Happy.

While segments for what. were written without production design in mind, with these elements being added later, Make Happy utilises lights, backing tracks, and other technology. Burnham began touring for Make Happy in February 2015. On December 11, 2015, Make Happy was recorded for Netflix at the Capitol Theatre in Port Chester, New York, and released on June 3, 2016, at a time when Netflix was releasing several original content stand-up comedy specials per month.

== Synopsis ==
In the introduction, Burnham awakes in a hotel room wearing clown makeup and walks to the theatre as a robotic voice addresses the audience, commenting on how the world is not funny. The show begins with a song based around call and response, where Burnham requests various groups in the audience (for example, virgins) to shout out "Hell, yeah!" After this song, Burnham immediately segues into a more introspective and meta song.

Following this, Burnham moves to his keyboard and performs a satirical song about the problems of being a straight white male, and then delivers a comedic monologue on the subject of race, in which he tricks the audience into shouting the word nigger. As Bo begins to change the subject, a pre-recorded song interrupts him, calling him a faggot, and continuing to call him a "fucking faggot" until he demands that the track be stopped. Burnham segues into a discussion of hip hop music, and delivers a hip-hop version of "I'm a Little Teapot" and "Baa, Baa, Black Sheep" to illustrate his point. Following a series of subversive jokes based around misdirection, Burnham claims he will improvise a song about a member of the audience, and asks an audience member for his name—Rob. A pre-recorded track plays about Bo having sex with someone's mother, and he inserts the name "Rob" into the gaps in the track. Burnham then starts talking about country music and criticising the modern-day industry, singing a mock country song about rich country singers pandering to their audiences.

After criticising the lip-syncing segment of The Tonight Show, Burnham performs a mime about seeing a penis in a restroom and then a song about love, where he advocates for people lowering their expectations when looking for a partner. He makes some quick-fire jokes and then performs further mimes about making sandwiches while high on marijuana, and intoxicated. Following from a fake advert for Flamin' Hot Cheetos, he presents a song where he tells the listener to kill themselves, explaining before, during and after the song that it is about the dangers of listening to pop singers' advice and taking their lyrics too seriously.

He deals with some brief heckling before beginning a song about a breakup, which focuses on the man lashing out as a way of dealing with his emotions. He then begins analysing the show's meaning, the culture of performance promoted by social media and the concept of the Me generation. Burnham then delivers a song inspired by the way Kanye West ended his performances for The Yeezus Tour, by ranting comedically about small annoyances such as the width of Pringle cans and overfilled burritos until slowly transitioning into singing about his conflicted relationship with his audience and his stage anxiety. This ends the stage show, but a closing segment features Burnham in the guest house of his own home, talking to the viewer with a song where he addresses the rhetorical question "Are you happy?". The song, and the special, ends with Burnham leaving the guest house, and greeting his girlfriend and dog. He later returns to this guest house in his next comedy special, Inside.

== Analysis ==
Thematically, as Burnham himself mentions in the special, Make Happy can be said to be "about performing". Throughout the show, Burnham maintains a "prickly persona" with the audience, "alternating between making them laugh and baiting them, even insulting them". The show is "meticulously choreographed" and makes extensive use of pre-recorded music, theatre lighting, sound effects and his audience; It has been described as a tonal continuation of what., which featured acts that have been compared to Make Happy's sandwich-making mime, breakup song, West parody, and intersperses comedy, music, theatrics and poetry. The show has "discrete bits" which are "seemingly disjointed" and contain many "small details", but there are connections between them.

Make Happy jokes about common tropes in comedy and music. The show's "quiet moments of honesty" serve to highlight a perceived lack of substance in the entertainment industry. Songs performed satirise hip-hop, bro-country and "inspirational" pop music. Other topics which the show comments on are the deification of celebrities and the omnipresent nature of social media. Burnham comments in an interview that the segment mocking Kanye West is "done with love", praising that West "makes amazing things and he pours himself into his work".

== Future ==
Following the release of Make Happy on Netflix in June 2016, Burnham stated that it may be the last stand-up show he performs in the foreseeable future, as he planned to focus more on writing. During his time away, he wrote and directed the award-winning 2018 comedy-drama film Eighth Grade. In May 2021, he released the critically acclaimed special Inside, which he shot and performed during the COVID-19 pandemic without an audience or crew entirely in one room of his home (the same room in which Make Happy ends).

== Critical reception ==
Make Happy was very well received by critics. Hugar of The A.V. Club gave the show an A− rating, calling it "one of the best stand up specials of the year". Hugar noted that the show "gets more avant-garde and considerably darker" than Burnham's previous material and summarised, "Burnham is a skilled comic and his combination of rapid-fire songwriting and meaty observations about modern life are captivating". Newman of Forbes gave Make Happy an overwhelmingly positive review, describing it as "easily the best comedy special [Netflix] has ever produced", praising Burnham's "whipsaw swaps between fun and thoughtfulness" and "honed and self-deprecating" stage presence.

Caballero of Impact gives the Netflix special a very positive review, saying that Burnham "showcases the satirical, arrogant yet self-deprecating humor that characterizes him", creating a work which is "deeply personal", and ends the show with "a question ["Are you happy?"] so heartfelt it is hard to imagine any other comedian being so sincere". Caballero praises this tonal shift as an improvement over the "child-like demeanour" displayed in what.

Williams in TheVine gives a positive review of the special, writing that Burnham "deconstructs himself in a hysterical, brilliantly self-conscious, sometimes unsettling routine". Czajkowski gave the show a mostly positive review in The Guardian, opining that Burnham is "exceptionally good at misdirection" and used a "mix of music, wit and experimental comedy" which created "a freshness rarely seen on stage", but critiquing some of his "raunchier material" and describing the show as "a little stuck".

Bennett of Chortle calls Burnham "intensively creative", with an ability to "surprise with a crafty turn of phrase", and believes the show to be an "hour of happiness". McCarthy of Decider says that Burnham displays a "shrewd knowledge of those funnymen and women who have hit the stages before him, as well as a propensity for deconstructing the very nature of entertainment, and the relationship between performer and audience, between star and fans".
