= Bezos I =

2021 song by Bo Burnham

Song by Bo Burnham

from the album Inside (The Songs)
- Released: June 10, 2021
- Genre: Comedy; synth-pop
- Length: 0:58
- Label: Attic Bedroom; Imperial; Ingrooves; Mercury
- Songwriter: Bo Burnham
- Producer: Bo Burnham

Audio
- "Bezos I" on YouTube

"Bezos I" is a song by American musical comedian Bo Burnham, appearing as the seventh song in his 2021 special Bo Burnham: Inside and its soundtrack. The song satirically describes Jeff Bezos, and later became a viral song on TikTok.

== Composition ==
"Bezos I" lyrically contains a single chorus and verse. The former repeats the occupation, birth year, and name of Jeff Bezos, and the latter disingenuously praises Bezos' efforts and wealth. A synthesizer solo and a scream follow this, ending the song in under a minute.

== Reception ==
The song garnered widespread usage on the video-based social media platform TikTok, being used to soundtrack various poor working conditions of Amazon employees. The song saw its highest popularity on July 20, 2021, the day of Bezos's space flight. Through the day and July 21, "Bezos I" and its sequel "Bezos II" were collectively streamed 1.7 million times, a rise of 21%. This led to the song appearing on several charts globally.

== Sequels ==
Burnham has released several sequels to "Bezos I". "Bezos II" is featured later in Bo Burnham: Inside, while "Bezos III" and "Bezos IV" each appear in the special's outtakes and album's deluxe version.

== Personnel ==
Credits adapted from Tidal.

- Bo Burnham – vocals, instruments, composer
- John Greenham – mastering engineer
- Mike Malchicoff – mixing engineer

== Charts ==
Weekly chart performance for "Bezos I"
Chart (2021)	Peak position
Canada Hot 100 (Billboard)	87
Global 200 (Billboard)	141
Ireland (IRMA)	51
Sweden (Sverigetopplistan)	79
UK Singles (Official Charts)	44
US Bubbling Under Hot 100 (Billboard)	21

== Certifications ==
Certifications for "Bezos I"
Region	Certification	Certified units/sales
United States (RIAA)	Platinum	1,000,000^{‡}
^{‡} Sales+streaming figures based on certification alone.
