= Zach Stone Is Gonna Be Famous =

2013 mockumentary sitcom

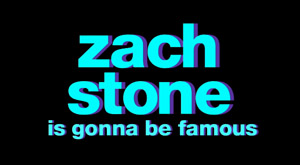
- Title design
- Genre: Mockumentary; Teen sitcom
- Created by: Bo Burnham; Dan Lagana
- Starring: Bo Burnham; Tom Wilson; Kari Coleman; Cameron Palatas; Caitlin Gerard; Armen Weitzman
- Country of origin: United States
- Original language: English
- No. of seasons: 1
- No. of episodes: 12

Production
- Executive producers: Dave Becky; Bo Burnham; Dan Lagana; Justin Levy; Luke Liacos; Michelle Klepper
- Producer: Robert West
- Camera setup: Single
- Running time: 21 minutes
- Production companies: 3 Arts Entertainment; MTV Production Development

Original release
- Network: MTV
- Release: May 2 – June 29, 2013

Zach Stone Is Gonna Be Famous is an American mockumentary sitcom created by Bo Burnham and Dan Lagana that aired for one season on MTV from May 2 to June 29, 2013. The series stars Burnham as Zach Stone, a recent high school graduate who opts to pursue a life of fame instead of attending college, subsequently hiring a camera crew to film his daily life as a "pre-celebrity" in his quest to become famous overnight despite being essentially talentless.

Three days before the first season finished, it was announced that the show had been cancelled. In 2021, the series suddenly received renewed interest following a massive surge in Burnham's popularity in the months after the release of his critically acclaimed one-man Netflix special Inside, and was soon made available to stream on Netflix.

== Premise ==
18-year-old Boston native Zach Stone graduates from high school and decides to chase a life of fame instead of attending college. Having saved money from his grocery store job over the last couple of years, he hires a camera crew from MTV to film him throughout his daily life as a part of his quest to become an overnight celebrity, even though he possesses no real talent. He tries anything possible to get noticed—such as trying to become a celebrity chef, creating novelty ringtones, and intentionally going missing—and will stop at nothing until he reaches stardom. He uses the entire summer break to get noticed and to hang out with his friends and love interest before they leave for college.

== Background ==
The series was commissioned by MTV in September 2010. Variety magazine reported that MTV had ordered a half-hour-long put pilot from Burnham about "a kid fresh out of high school who's pursuing the new American dream of being a celebrity without having any talent". The show was inspired by a study that asked graduating high schoolers about the careers they wanted, with 40% choosing simply "famous" compared to shockingly low numbers choosing careers such as "doctor". The pilot was filmed in 2011, while the rest of the season was filmed over the course of 2012.

Burnham initially planned the show to be a dark satire that would punish Zach for having shallow priorities, but he soon saw Zach as a sympathetic character due to being an inevitable result of the culture surrounding him. The show spoofs youth culture, celebrity, and the pursuit of fame. Zach projects the public image that he believes will most likely make him famous and casts a thin layer over his true feelings, but the mask often slips to reveal that he is an insecure young man who sees fame as the solution to all of his problems. The show was primarily inspired by comedy series such as The Larry Sanders Show, The Comeback, and the original British version of The Office, the latter of which Burnham considers one of his favorite shows of all time, stating that he watches it from start to finish at least once a year.

== Cast ==
- Bo Burnham as Zach Stone, a recently graduated 18-year-old who pursues fame over attending college and will do anything to get famous
- Tom Wilson as Andrew "Drew" Stone, Zach's exasperated father
- Kari Coleman as Sydney Stone, Zach's patient mother
- Cameron Palatas as Andrew Michael "Andy" Stone, Zach's more athletic and socially adept younger brother
- Caitlin Gerard as Amy Page, Zach's friend, neighbor, and eventual love interest
- Armen Weitzman as Greg LeBlanc, Zach's shy Jewish friend
- Rory Scovel as Pat, Zach's nervous yet affable boss at the grocery store
- Robbie Amell as Nick, Amy's charismatic boyfriend who works as a personal trainer, and whom Zach sees as his rival
- Shelley Hennig as Christy Ackerman, the hottest girl in Zach's former high school who wants to use him to get famous
- Jason Rogel as Marcus, a member of Zach's camera crew
- Justin Dray as Phillip, a member of Zach's camera crew
- Arshad Aslam as Hasaad, a member of Zach's camera crew

== Episodes ==
No.	Title	Directed by	Written by	Original release date	U.S. viewers (millions)
1	"Pilot"	Jeffrey Blitz	Dan Lagana & Bo Burnham	May 2, 2013	0.65
Zach Stone decides to forgo college to star in his own, self funded reality show. With his friends all leaving for school, he envisions a different path toward fame and a chance to "headline" a funeral is his first big step.
2	"Zach Stone Is Gonna Be a Recording Artist"	Joe Nussbaum	Isaac Aptaker & Elizabeth Berger	May 9, 2013	0.57
The music business is Zach's next frontier as the frontman of the world's first "ringtone band". Adopting a rebellious persona, he takes to the stage with sidekick Greg and beautiful Christy.
3	"Zach Stone Is Gonna Get a Makeover"	Joe Nussbaum	Jon Silberman & Josh Silberman	May 16, 2013	0.39
When Christy invites Zach to a weekend pool party, he wants to show off his new image. After getting a full makeover, he's ready for his big reveal, but his attention shifts when he witnesses a spark between Amy and Nick, a trainer at the gym he and Amy decide to go to who previously met both of them when they were all in high school.
4	"Zach Stone Is Gonna Make a Sex Tape"	Joe Nussbaum	Todd Waldman	May 23, 2013	0.39
Christy asks Zach out on a date and insists on bringing the camera crew. When Christy's true intentions come out, Zach decides to kick her off his show.
5	"Zach Stone Is Gonna Get Wild"	Jeffrey Walker	Julia Brownell	May 30, 2013	0.36
An invitation to his first college party at Boston College, which he begrudgingly accepts from Nick, gives Zach an idea as to how he may be able to pursue both college and fame at the same time; he has been accepted into Emerson College, but plans to pass the opportunity up in favor of his quest for fame. Towards the end of the party, he becomes upset over Amy's budding relationship with Nick, as he had subconsciously considered Amy a fallback romantic option and realizes that he had taken her for granted.
6	"Zach Stone Is Gonna Be a Celebrity Chef"	Jeffrey Walker	Gavin Steckler	June 6, 2013	0.33
Zach challenges Nick to a cook-off to try and attempts to become a celebrity chef. Zach jumps at the chance to cater at the book club that his parents attend, which is hosted by Nick's mother, but he fails spectacularly and tries to serve the guests raw shrimp. However, witnessing Zach's embarrassment gives his parents the courage to finally stand up to Nick's mother and call out her pretentiousness.
7	"Zach Stone Is Gonna Be the Zachelor"	Jeffrey Walker	Isaac Aptaker & Elizabeth Berger	June 13, 2013	N/A
Believing that "America wants competitive love", Zach plans to deliver by hosting his new Bachelor rip-off show The Zachelor.
8	"Zach Stone Is Gonna Go Missing"	Todd Strauss-Schulson	Ryan Walls	June 20, 2013	N/A
With a fake ransom video and well-planned disappearance, Zach goes "missing" to garner evening news fame in hopes of America watching with bated breath. However, his younger brother Andy is the first in their household to receive Zach's ransom video; quickly recognizing it as fake, he keeps it to himself in order to ruin Zach's plan. Zach returns to his household after only 26 hours and ruins a family game night while venting his frustrations. Nick throws Amy a surprise party but only gets a lukewarm response from her, after which she goes to console Zach, making him realize that she is the only person to welcome him back with any enthusiasm after his staged disappearance.
9	"Zach Stone Is Gonna Be Scary"	Todd Strauss-Schulson	Ryan Walls	June 20, 2013	N/A
To win a bet with Andy as to who gets scared first, Zach plans a hoax to film him in an "ultimate scare video" to become the next YouTube sensation. He eventually challenges Andy to spend the night in a locally infamous abandoned house. Greg and Amy accompany them on the sleepover, which makes Nick act uncharacteristically jealous towards Amy. Towards the end of the night, Zach and Amy kiss each other.
10	"Zach Stone Is Gonna Be an Actor"	Todd Strauss-Schulson	Bo Burnham	June 27, 2013	N/A
Zach's life feels magical after kissing Amy, and his chance to be a movie star beckons after he performs a good audition for a student film. While working his grocery store job, he crosses paths with Nick, who reveals that he and Amy broke up. When Zach lets slip that he and Amy kissed, Nick physically assaults Zach before Zach's boss Pat kicks Nick out of the store. Zach later shows up at Amy's front porch with a showy proposal for the two of them to go steady, but when Amy confesses that she feels conflicted and hesitates to jump into a relationship with him right away, Zach accuses her of using him for experience for a supposed promiscuous phase in college. Despite the outburst, they later agree to reconcile as friends. Zach's romantically-charged mood swings throughout the episode help him to land a starring role in the student film, but they later cause him to get fired.
11	"Zach Stone Is Gonna Be a Hero"	Stuart McDonald	Gavin Steckler	June 29, 2013	N/A
After seeing a man being interviewed on television for saving children from a burning building, Zach decides that he is going to be a hero. Greg agrees to pose as a drowning victim for Zach to save on camera, despite being busy preparing to move to a new town for college. Greg gets frustrated enough to call out Zach's selfish ways to his face, but they later reconcile. Zach brings a homemade DVD of his staged rescue to a local news station, but an employee immediately throws it away as soon as Zach turns his back.
12	"Zach Stone Is Gonna Be Famous (No, Really)"	Stuart McDonald	Dan Lagana & Bo Burnham	June 29, 2013	N/A
A big TV news station is preparing a story on Zach's search for fame, causing more drama within his family; his parents reluctantly agree to appear in the broadcast but Andy refuses, resulting in Zach's camera crew member Marcus posing as his younger brother despite being Asian. Amy walks in on the interview being filmed and is distraught to overhear Zach say that he wants to "do this alone" and just wants "to be famous". Zach goes to see Amy one last time before she leaves for college, but her mother tells him that she already left; in reality, she is sitting on the stairs in her house, quietly crying while listening to her mother lie for her. When Zach goes to the news station for a live interview, he is shown videos of his parents, brother, and Amy praising him despite his selfish behavior. He has an epiphany and leaves the studio during the broadcast in hopes of reconciling with Amy, only to find her already waiting for him in the parking lot. They reunite with a kiss, but are interrupted when the security gate opens to reveal dozens of people who have become Zach's fans after watching the news. While Zach immediately basks in his newfound fame, Amy looks extremely doubtful and disappointed.

== Reception ==
=== Ratings ===
Zach Stone Is Gonna Be Famous struggled in the ratings during its run. The series premiered to 650,000 viewers and saw its numbers decrease to half of that midway through its season. The show originally aired at 10:30 p.m. on Thursdays during May, but was moved to 11 p.m. in June to expand its dwindling audience. MTV scheduled its eighth and ninth episodes to air back to back, and burned off the following three the next week. MTV officially cancelled the series on June 26.

=== Critical response ===
Zach Stone Is Gonna Be Famous received generally positive reviews from television critics. Brian Lowry of Variety wrote that "the concept is hardly original" but the series "still feels fresh and timely [...] this single-camera satire zeroes in on a burning, warped desire to be famous that MTV, as much as anyone, has stoked and exemplified". He added that "even MTV appears oddly oblivious to the ironies of this dichotomy". Entertainment Weekly called the pilot a "promising debut", positively reviewing Burnham's portrayal of the titular character: "Because there's an inherent empathy to the character, it's a delight watching him strive and fail to make the mundane ordinariness of his suburban reality sexy." While noting the premise of parodying reality shows covered no new ground, The New York Times did commend the show's attempt to aim "straight for the dark underbelly of all these fantasies" and wrote, "It's one thing to put on a show; it's another to do so to mask huge holes within."

Pilot Viruet of The A.V. Club noted that the character's "off-camera moments", such as his appeasement of girl-next-door Amy in the pilot, were more satisfying than watching "a completely abhorrent character do awful thing after awful thing". Viruet added, "It's clear that the writers (and Zach) are so knowledgeable of this particular world that the end result is smarter than you'd expect the average reality show send-up to be." Newsday called the show "almost too clever, funny and ironic for MTV", also praising the show's softer moments: "Zach is both commentary and send-up of the ephemera that MTV and the Internet at large celebrate – then instantly forget. [...] But there's a core gentleness here, too, and while Zach's frenetic attention span is extremely splintered, he still manages to be relatable."

In contrast, David Wiegand of the San Francisco Chronicle felt that the show "is more noisy than funny" and compared it to Burnham's beginnings posting videos to YouTube from his bedroom: "His bedroom videos were weird, too, but funny-weird, not I-need-an-Excedrin weird." Hank Stuever of The Washington Post gave the series a scathing review, claiming that "this show is so bad, it's beneath even MTV". Describing the series as "irritating", he said, "One thing about MTV's so-called original programming is that it is often a safe refuge for the criminally unoriginal. I would like to point out that we can extradite Burnham back to reality and prosecute him as an adult."
