= Bo Burnham =

American comedian and musician (born 1990)

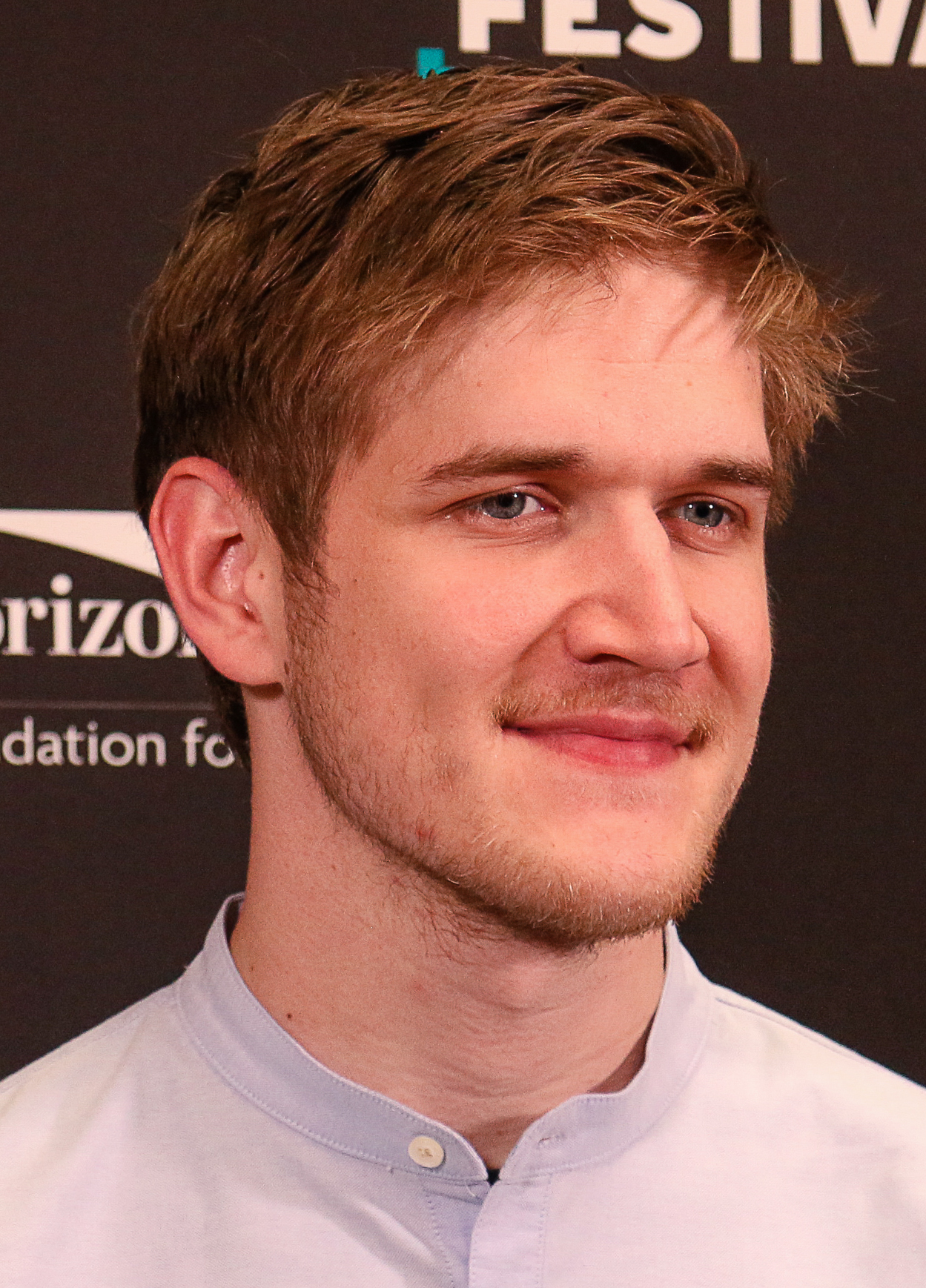
- Burnham in 2018
- Born: Robert Pickering Burnham; August 21, 1990 (age 36); Hamilton, Massachusetts, U.S.
- Occupations: Stand-up comedian; musician; actor; filmmaker; YouTuber
- Years active: 2006–present
- Partners: Lorene Scafaria (2013–2022); Phoebe Bridgers (2022–present)

Comedy career
- Medium: Stand-up; television; film; music
- Genres: Black comedy; musical comedy; satire
- Musical career
- Genres: Musical comedy; pop rock; comedy hip hop
- Instruments: Vocals; piano; keyboards; guitar
- Label: Comedy Central

YouTube information
- Channel: boburnham
- Years active: 2006–present
- Genres: Music; comedy
- Subscribers: 3.85 million
- Views: 1.08 billion
- Last updated: November 11, 2026
- Website: boburnham.com

Robert Pickering Burnham (born August 21, 1990) is an American comedian, musician, actor, filmmaker and poet. Burnham's work combines elements of filmmaking with music, sketch, and stand-up comedy, commonly with a dramatic, satirical, or tragic twist that is often left open to interpretation. He has received various accolades including three Emmy Awards, a Grammy Award, a Peabody Award and an Independent Spirit Award.

Born in Hamilton, Massachusetts, Burnham created his YouTube channel in 2006, where he uploaded videos of him playing comedic songs that he wrote, often featuring wordplay and taboo or dark subject matters. The videos quickly went viral, making him one of the earliest YouTube stars. He began creating albums featuring his songs, such as Bo fo Sho (2008) and the self-titled album Bo Burnham (2009).

Burnham switched his focus from YouTube to performing stand-up comedy routines, which combined his comedy songs with traditional stand-up. He released three comedy specials, Words Words Words (2010), what. (2013), and Make Happy (2016). Burnham co-created and starred in the 2013 MTV mockumentary series Zach Stone Is Gonna Be Famous. He also published the poetry book Egghead: Or, You Can't Survive on Ideas Alone (2013). He went on to make his filmmaking debut as the writer and director of the drama film Eighth Grade (2018) and began directing other comedians' comedy specials, as well as co-starring in the dark comedy thriller film Promising Young Woman (2020).

In 2016, Burnham announced his intention to step away from performing live, which he later revealed to be due to him suffering from anxiety and experiencing panic attacks on stage. Burnham returned to performing with his fourth comedy special, Inside (2021), which he created in his home without a crew or audience during the COVID-19 pandemic; it was released by Netflix to widespread acclaim, winning a Peabody Award. The special was nominated in six categories at the 73rd Emmy Awards, winning three. At the 64th Grammy Awards, Inside was nominated for Best Music Film and Best Song Written for Visual Media, winning the latter for "All Eyes on Me". Three songs from the special appeared also on the Billboard charts and were certified platinum in the United States, as was the accompanying album Inside (The Songs).

== Early life ==
Burnham was born on August 21, 1990, in Hamilton, Massachusetts, a suburb of Boston. He is the son of Patricia (née Singer) Burnham, a hospice nurse, and Scott Burnham, a construction company owner. His mother's work was covered in a 2014 episode of This American Life. He has an older sister named Samm and an older brother named Pete, both of whom work for their father's construction company. Burnham was raised Presbyterian and attended St. John's Preparatory School, a Catholic school in Danvers, Massachusetts, where he received a free education as his mother was the school's nurse at the time. He made the honor roll and was involved in theater and the campus ministry program; he graduated in 2008. He was accepted into the New York University Tisch School of the Arts to study experimental theatre, but deferred his admission for a year to pursue a career in comedy and ultimately did not attend at all.

== Career ==
=== 2006–2008: Beginnings on YouTube ===
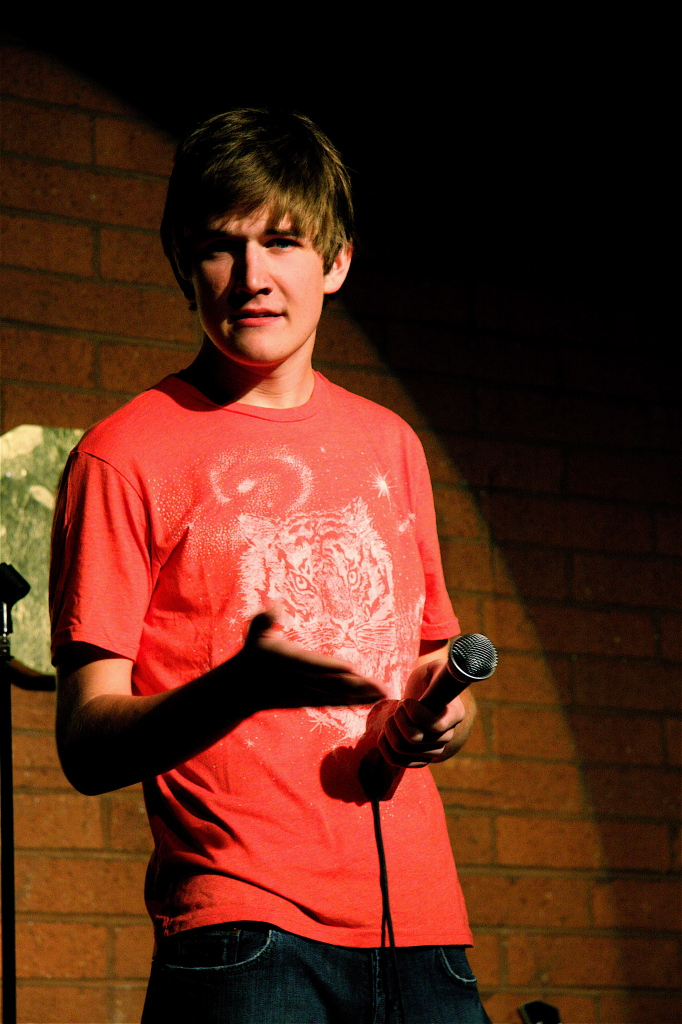
Burnham at The Improv in September 2008

Burnham began his career on YouTube in 2006. In December 2006, he wanted to show two songs he had written to his older brother Pete, who had left the family home to attend university in New York City. A friend suggested that he film himself performing the songs in his bedroom and post them on YouTube, which was then a relatively new website. His song "My Whole Family..." quickly became popular when the link to its YouTube video was shared on Break.com, soon leading to it being shared on other sites.

Accompanying himself on guitar or digital piano, Burnham continued to release self-described "pubescent musical comedy" songs and videos online as his audience grew. Described in The Boston Globe as "simultaneously wholesome and disturbing, intimate in a folksy-creepy sort of way", Burnham wrote and released songs about white supremacy, Helen Keller's disabilities, homosexuality, and more. All of Burnham's early videos were recorded in and around his family's home, mostly in his bedroom, and had an intentional "do-it-yourself [feel], almost like voyeurism".

Burnham's music and performances tackle such subjects as class, race, gender, human sexuality, sex, and religion. Burnham describes his on-stage persona as a "more arrogant, stuck-up version [of] himself". When speaking with The Detroit News about his rapping, he expressed his intent to honor and respect the perspective and culture of hip-hop music.

Burnham recorded a performance in London for Comedy Central's The World Stands Up in January 2008 (aired June 30), making him the youngest person to do so at the age of 17, and signed a four-record deal with Comedy Central Records. Comedy Central Records released Burnham's first EP, the six-song Bo fo Sho, as an online release-only album on June 17, 2008. Burnham's first full album, the self-titled Bo Burnham, was released on March 10, 2009.

=== 2009–2016: Stand-up and comedy specials ===
Burnham has performed his music in the United States, including Cobb's Comedy Club, YouTube Live in San Francisco, and Caroline's Comedy Club in New York City, and internationally in London and Montreal. In August 2010, Burnham was nominated for "Best Comedy Show" at the 2010 Edinburgh Comedy Awards after his inaugural performance (of Bo Burnham: Words, Words, Words). He instead received the "Panel Prize", a £5,000 prize for "the show or act who has most captured the comedy spirit of the 2010 Fringe".

While performing at the Montreal Just for Laughs festival in 2008, Burnham met with director and producer Judd Apatow. In September 2008, he negotiated with Universal Pictures to write and create the music for an Apatow-produced comedy film which he described as the "anti-High School Musical", although he insisted that the script is not a parody of the Disney musicals, but rather an attempt to emulate the high school he attended. Hoping to also star in the film, Burnham told Wired that he named the lead character after himself in a "not-so-subtle hint". In a March 2009 interview with Boston's Weekly Dig, he said that he was spending eight hours a day writing the music for the film and spending his evenings writing the script. Burnham's high school friend Luke Liacos was co-writing the screenplay. In an October 2010 interview on MTV, Burnham admitted that he did not know anything about the future of the project, and that it was all effectively up in the air as far as he knew.

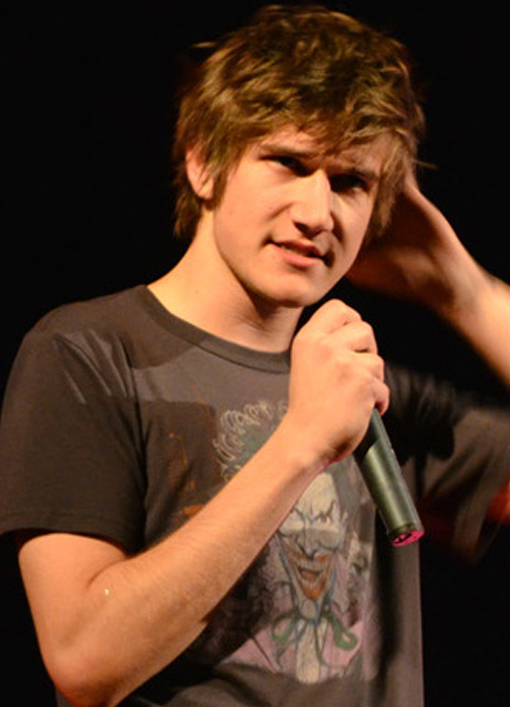
Burnham in April 2012

On March 3, 2009, fifteen Westminster College students (members of the campus' Gay-Straight Alliance, Black Students Association, International Club, and Cultural Diversity Organization) protested his concert there that evening, due to his use of homophobic and racist terms in performances. Of the controversy, he said, "It's so ironic because gay bashers were the ones labeling me in high school. ... I try and write satire that's well-intentioned. But those intentions have to be hidden. It can't be completely clear and that's what makes it comedy." Despite the college's admission that they had booked Burnham while ignorant of his show's material, dean of students John Comerford praised the opportunities for discourse the controversy brought the school. In May 2009, viral marketing began appearing for Funny People, in which Burnham starred in an NBC sitcom called Yo Teach! In the promo, he starred opposite Jason Schwartzman as a student in the latter's English class.

On May 21, 2010, Burnham taped his first one-hour stand-up special, entitled Words Words Words, for Comedy Central from the House of Blues in Boston as part of the network's new "House of Comedy" series of stand-up specials; it aired on Comedy Central on October 16, 2010, and was released for purchase two days later. Burnham finished in first place at the 2011 Comedy Central Stand-up Showdown.

In 2013, Burnham wrote, executive-produced, and starred in Zach Stone Is Gonna Be Famous alongside Dan Lagana, Luke Liacos, and Dave Becky. The series was cancelled after one season. He also released a book of poetry called Egghead: Or, You Can't Survive on Ideas Alone.

Burnham's second special, what., was released on both Netflix and YouTube on December 17, 2013. His third special, Make Happy, was produced by Netflix and released on June 3, 2016.

=== 2017–2020: Filmmaking and Eighth Grade ===
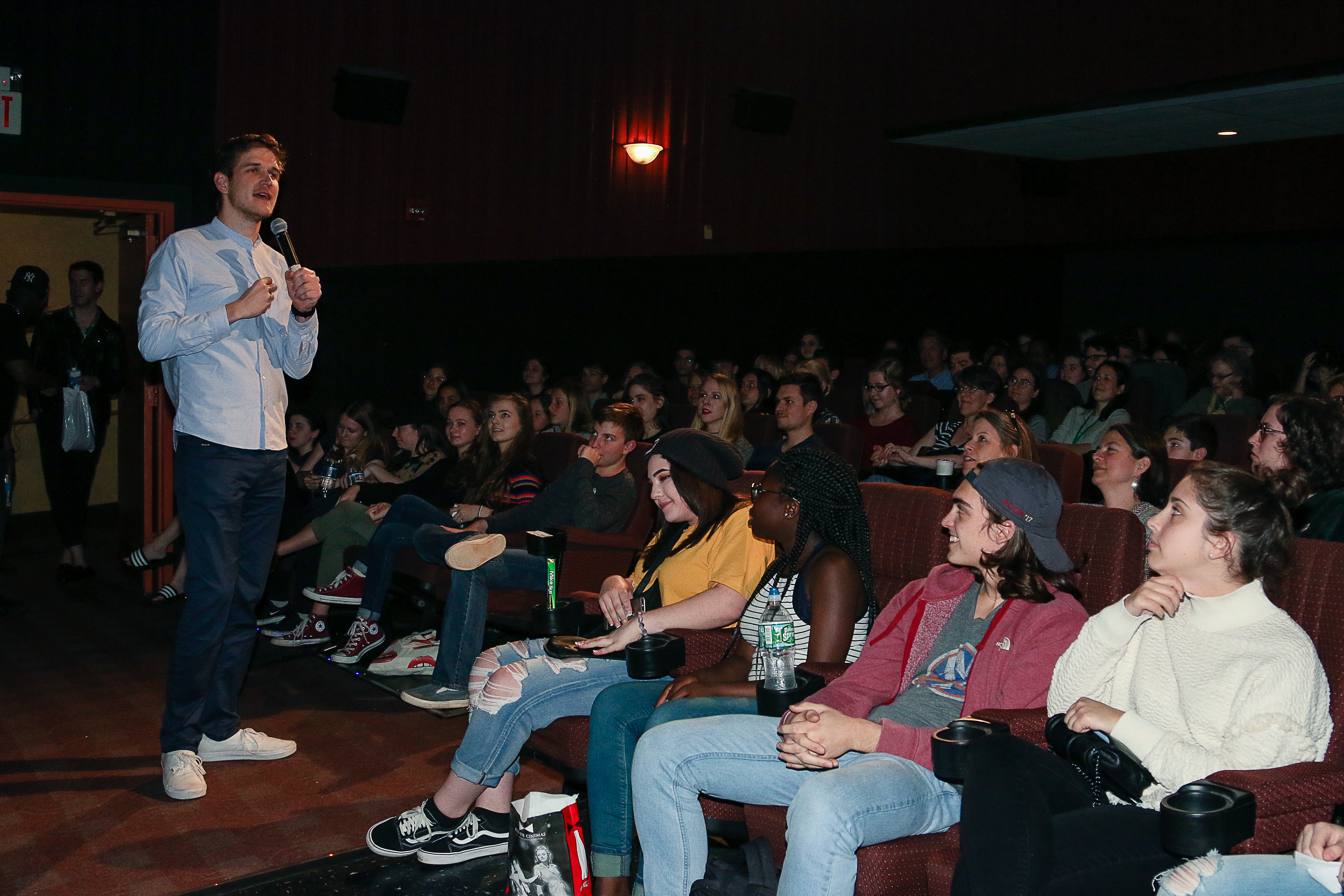
Burnham at the Montclair Film Festival in 2018.

Burnham wrote and directed his first feature film, Eighth Grade, which was produced and distributed by A24 and premiered at the Sundance Film Festival in January 2018. The film has been universally acclaimed; among other accolades, it received the Writers Guild of America Award for Best Original Screenplay and the Directors Guild of America Award for Outstanding Directing – First-Time Feature Film. As of 2026, it garnered a 99% approval rating on Rotten Tomatoes based on 322 reviews, and holds an average rating of 85 out of 100 on Metacritic.

Burnham directed Jerrod Carmichael's comedy special 8 (2017) for HBO and Chris Rock's comedy special Tamborine (2018) for Netflix. In an interview with Vulture, he discussed his directorial outlook when directing a comedy special: "I approached [the special], which was me taking stock of the feelings that I get out of watching this person perform and asking, 'How can I recreate that for the audience as best as possible? How can I make a good container for the thing?' But the thing is being provided by them, so a lot of directing is just getting out of their way."

In 2019, it was announced Burnham would contribute songs to an upcoming Sesame Street film.

In 2020, Burnham played the protagonist's love interest Ryan Cooper in the black comedy revenge thriller film Promising Young Woman. The film debuted at the Sundance Film Festival, where it received critical acclaim, and was later nominated for the Academy Award for Best Picture. In an interview, Burnham said, "This is a story I could never tell. This is a perspective I don't have. After doing my own things, it's like I really like the idea of, I just want to serve someone else's vision."

In March 2021, Burnham was cast as Boston Celtics legend Larry Bird in Winning Time: The Rise of the Lakers Dynasty from HBO. Due to scheduling conflicts he left the series in August 2021.

=== 2021–present: Inside and directing ===
In April 2021, Burnham ended his social media hiatus to announce that his fourth special, Inside, would be released on May 30. Created by Burnham alone in his home's guest house without a crew or audience during the COVID-19 pandemic, Inside received widespread acclaim. It was nominated in six categories for the 73rd Primetime Creative Arts Emmy Awards, winning three for Outstanding Music Direction, Outstanding Writing, and Outstanding Directing for a Variety Special. Burnham also received two nominations at the 64th Annual Grammy Awards for Best Music Film and Best Song Written for Visual Media ("All Eyes On Me"), although the special was ruled ineligible for Best Comedy Album. Three songs from the album ("Bezos I", "All Eyes On Me", and "Welcome to the Internet") earned Burnham his first charting songs on the US Bubbling Under Hot 100 and Global 200 charts. They were certified platinum in the United States, as was the accompanying album, Inside (The Songs).

On May 30, 2022, the first anniversary of Inside, Burnham released 63 minutes of unseen footage from the special on YouTube, titled The Inside Outtakes. In June 2022, he released an accompanying album with the same name containing all the songs from the video and two new others. He also released Inside (Deluxe), an album containing all of the songs from Inside and the outtakes, as well as all of the ambient and instrumental tracks from the special and its outtakes. Burnham submitted "Five Years" from The Inside Outtakes to the Best Song Written for Visual Media category at the 65th Annual Grammy Awards, though it was not nominated. At the 66th Annual Grammy Awards, Inside (Deluxe Box Set) was nominated for Best Boxed or Special Limited Edition Package.

Burnham directed, edited, and executive produced Carmichael's comedy special Rothaniel (2022), which received acclaim. He directed and executive produced Kate Berlant's comedy special entitled Kate Berlant: Cinnamon in the Wind, (recorded in 2019 but airing in 2022). Burnham also directed her 2022 solo stage play Kate.

Burnham is credited as a co-writer and additional vocalist on several songs on Phoebe Bridgers' album Lost Weekend, released in August 2026.

== Style ==
Burnham's comedic style is often categorized as satire, covering topics such as homophobia, mental illness, sexism, and racism for both shock value and social commentary. He has cited Kate Berlant, Catherine Breillat, George Carlin, John Cassavetes, Flight of the Conchords, Mitch Hedberg, Anthony Jeselnik, Stephen Lynch, Demetri Martin, Steve Martin, Tim Minchin, and Hans Teeuwen as influences. He named Steve Martin as being the most important of these. His musical style has also drawn comparisons to Tom Lehrer, and he was reported to have written his 2009 song "New Math" as a tribute to Lehrer's 1965 song of the same name.

Burnham said of controversy surrounding his older material in 2009, "I try and write satire that's well-intentioned. But those intentions have to be hidden. It can't be completely clear, and that's what makes it comedy." As his career progressed, he began expressing regret for his early material, which he described as "shock-jock offensive comedy done by a 16-year-old without any tact". During press for his film Eighth Grade in 2018, he used the controversies surrounding his work to express concerns about the new concept of teenagers' mistakes being immortalized online: "I'm happy to be an example of someone who failed out loud publicly, in a certain way, and who has hopefully been able to evolve and get past that. And I do worry that kids don't have that freedom anymore." In an interview with NPR, he said that he has "a lot of material from back then that [he's] not proud of and [thinks] is offensive and not helpful". He further addressed this topic on the song "Problematic" from his 2021 comedy special Inside.

== Personal life ==
Burnham lives in Los Angeles. He was in a relationship with filmmaker Lorene Scafaria from 2013 to 2022. Since December 2022, Burnham has been dating singer Phoebe Bridgers.

Known to be a private person, Burnham usually avoids giving interviews or uploading to social media unless he promotes a new project. Having previously referenced struggling with anxiety and panic attacks, particularly surrounding his creative work and performances, he confirmed in Inside that this was the reason he walked away from live performance.

== Work ==
=== Filmography ===
==== Film ====
Bo Burnham film work
Year	Title	Role	Notes	Ref.
2009	American Virgin	Rudy		
2009	Funny People	Yo Teach! Cast Member		
2011	Hall Pass	Bartender		
2012	Adventures in the Sin Bin	Tony		
2017	The Big Sick	CJ		
2017	Rough Night	Tobey		
2018	Eighth Grade	—N/a	Writer and director	
2020	Promising Young Woman	Ryan Cooper		

==== Television ====
Bo Burnham television work
Year	Title	Role	Credited as			Notes	Ref.
Year	Title	Role	Director	Producer	Editor	Notes	Ref.
2010	Words, Words, Words	Himself	No	Yes	No	Comedy special	
2011	The Green Room with Paul Provenza	Himself	No	No	No	Season 2, Episode 1	
2013	what.	Himself	Yes	Yes	No	Comedy special, co-director	
2013	Zach Stone Is Gonna Be Famous	Zach Stone	No	Yes	No	12 episodes, also, co-creator, writer	
2014	Parks and Recreation	Chipp McCapp	No	No	No	Episode: "Flu Season 2"	
2015	Key and Peele	Lyle	No	No	No	Episode: "A Cappella Club"	
2015	Kroll Show	Diz	No	No	No	2 episodes	
2016	Make Happy	Himself	Yes	Yes	No	Comedy special, co-director	
2016	We Bare Bears	Andrew Bangs (voice)	No	No	No	Episode: "Nom Nom's Entourage"	
2017	Comrade Detective	Sergiu (voice)	No	No	No	Episode: "The Invisible Hand"	
2017	Jerrod Carmichael: 8	—N/a	Yes	Yes	No	Comedy special	
2018	Chris Rock: Tamborine	—N/a	Yes	No	No	Comedy special	
2019	Jerrod Carmichael: Home Videos	—N/a	No	Yes	No	Special	
2019	Jerrod Carmichael: Sermon on the Mount	—N/a	No	Yes	No	Special	
2019	Lil Rel Howery: Live in Crenshaw	—N/a	No	Yes	No	Comedy special	
2020	Whitmer Thomas: The Golden One	—N/a	No	Yes	No	Comedy special	
2021	Inside	Himself	Yes	Yes	Yes	Comedy special	
2022	Jerrod Carmichael: Rothaniel	—N/a	Yes	Yes	Yes	Comedy special	
2022	Kate Berlant: Cinnamon in the Wind	—N/a	Yes	Yes	No	Comedy special released on Hulu	

=== Discography ===
- Bo Burnham (2009)
- Words, Words, Words (2010)
- what. (2013)
- Inside (The Songs) (2021)

=== Tours ===
Bo Burnham tours
Year	Title	Ref.
2009	Fake ID Tour	
2010	Bo Burnham and (No) Friends	
2011–2012	Bo Burnham Live	
2013	what. Tour	
2015–2016	Make Happy Tour	

=== Bibliography ===
- Egghead: Or, You Can't Survive on Ideas Alone (2013)

== Awards and nominations ==
At the 2010 Edinburgh Festival Fringe, he was nominated for the main Edinburgh Comedy Award and won both the Edinburgh Comedy Awards' panel prize and the Malcolm Hardee "Act Most Likely to Make a Million Quid" Award.

Year	Award	Category	Project	Result	Ref.
2018	Boston Society of Film Critics	Best New Filmmaker	Eighth Grade	Won	
2018	Chicago Film Critics Association	Best Original Screenplay	Eighth Grade	Nominated	
2018	Chicago Film Critics Association	Most Promising Filmmaker	Eighth Grade	Nominated	
2018	Directors Guild of America Award	Outstanding Directing – First-Time Feature Film	Eighth Grade	Won	
2018	Independent Spirit Awards	Best First Screenplay	Eighth Grade	Won	
2018	National Board of Review	Best Directorial Debut	Eighth Grade	Won	
2018	New York Film Critics Circle	Best First Film	Eighth Grade	Won	
2018	San Diego Film Critics Society	Best Director	Eighth Grade	Nominated	
2018	San Diego Film Critics Society	Best Original Screenplay	Eighth Grade	Won	
2018	San Diego Film Critics Society	Best Breakout Artist	Eighth Grade	Nominated	
2018	Sundance Film Festival	Grand Jury Prize	Eighth Grade	Nominated	
2019	Writers Guild of America Award	Best Original Screenplay	Eighth Grade	Won	
2020	Hollywood Critics Association	Best Supporting Actor	Promising Young Woman	Nominated	
2021	Peabody Awards	Entertainment	Bo Burnham: Inside	Won	
2021	Hollywood Critics Association	Best Streaming Sketch Series, Variety Series, Talk Show, or Comedy/Variety Special	Bo Burnham: Inside	Won	
2021	Primetime Emmy Awards	Outstanding Variety Special (Pre-Recorded)	Bo Burnham: Inside	Nominated	
2021	Primetime Emmy Awards	Outstanding Directing for a Variety Special	Bo Burnham: Inside	Won	
2021	Primetime Emmy Awards	Outstanding Writing for a Variety Special	Bo Burnham: Inside	Won	
2021	Primetime Emmy Awards	Outstanding Picture Editing for Variety Programming	Bo Burnham: Inside	Nominated	
2021	Primetime Emmy Awards	Outstanding Music Direction	Bo Burnham: Inside	Won	
2021	Primetime Emmy Awards	Outstanding Original Music and Lyrics	Bo Burnham: Inside	Nominated	
2022	Grammy Awards	Best Music Film	Bo Burnham: Inside	Nominated	
2022	Grammy Awards	Best Song Written for Visual Media	"All Eyes On Me"	Won	
2022	Libera Award	Best Outlier Record	Inside (The Songs)	Nominated	
2022	Primetime Emmy Awards	Outstanding Directing for a Variety Special	Jerrod Carmichael: Rothaniel	Nominated	
2024	Grammy Awards	Best Boxed or Special Limited Edition Package	Inside (Deluxe Box Set)	Nominated	
2027	Grammy Awards	Best Rock Song	"Lost Boys"	Pending	

== Works cited ==
- Chase, Katie (April 13, 2009). "Raunchy teen comic plays to the crowd". The Boston Globe. ISSN 0743-1791. Archived from the original on April 18, 2009.
- Greenberg, Emily (October 5, 2010). "Politically Incorrect, Politically". The Cornell Daily Sun. Ithaca, New York: Cornell University. ISSN 1095-8169. Archived from the original on November 24, 2010.
