= Words Words Words =

Live album by Bo Burnham
- Released: October 19, 2010
- Recorded: June 30, 2010 (live material); Carolines on Broadway
- Genre: Comedy
- Length: 58:45
- Label: Comedy Central Records
- Producers: Jack Vaughn Jr., Kool Keith

Bo Burnham chronology
Bo Burnham (2009)	Words Words Words (2010)	what. (2013)

Singles from Words Words Words
- 1. "Words, Words, Words" Released: September 14, 2010; 2. "Oh Bo" Released: October 19, 2010

Words Words Words refers to both a stand-up comedy routine and the second album by American comedian Bo Burnham. The live performance debuted at the Boston House of Blues on May 21, 2010, and the album is derived from a special live performance of the same set at Carolines on Broadway on June 30, 2010. In addition to the Carolines performance, the album has two studio singles, "Words, Words, Words" and "Oh Bo".

The House of Blues debut performance and the Carolines on Broadway performances were released on DVD and MP3/CD, respectively, with the constituent material from the set being generally well received. The album alone charted on four separate Billboard charts, topping out at number one on the Billboard Comedy chart.

== Synopsis ==
Bo steps out on stage to a round of applause and thanks the audience. He performs a “heigh-ho” call-and-response with the audience, then likens the circumstance to Nazi chants. He sings “What’s Funny”, which warns that the show will be highly offensive, before the song delves into the nature of comedy and criticisms of stand-up tropes, with Bo repeatedly and maniachly complaining about his apparent ex-wife, radical feminism, life problems, and sexual frustration.

Bo performs some traditional stand-up about various contentious topics—an ex-girlfriend with a dead mother, realism and the symmetry of life, racial politics, denying homeless people change, and ‘yo mama’ jokes. He then professes that women are always right and sings “Men & Women”, which repeatedly insults men while praising women. The stand-up continues, with Bo discussing his success and history as a ‘young comedian’ and reenacting absurd scenes from various shows he has performed in, though he admits none of them are real. Bo sings “Ironic” about comedic paradoxes, before telling more rapid-fire jokes about the meaning of art and the questionable morals of Disney, but is interrupted by insistent sexual harassment from hecklers in the audience. He raps “Words Words Words”, consisting of contentious wordplay, then initiates a group prayer with the audience which mocks Christianity. Bo jokes about starvation in Sub-Saharan Africa, then tells the audience that he is going to read some original introspective haikus before going back to comedy—which all end up being unserious with crude punchlines.

Bo recites a sonnet from the perspective of William Shakespeare writing pornography, then freestyle raps criticising Shakespeare while adopting his writing style. He promises a song about quantum mechanics which ends up being key mashing, then one about Christian Hell which is a single line about Adolf Hitler and the Jews awkwardly meeting. Bo sings “Rant” which further criticises Christianity and expresses his disinterest in Church as a child, before performing an intentionally dry set about theoretical physics. He jokes about gay marriage and white exceptionalism, then reads out some facetious statistics, but the audience reacts poorly to “0.27% of Jenga games are played on 9/11”. After some prop comedy with a drum kit, he sings the jokeless song “Art is Dead”, about how entertainers are rewarded for never growing out of attention seeking, his addiction to attention and getting paid for it, unworthiness of fame, the effects of capitalism on art, and how the audience should not respect him—which is met with cheers and applause. Bo brings up that his stage act is not conventional, and once again mocks traditional stand-up comedy by repeatedly bringing up his apparent loveless marriage.

He sings “Oh Bo”, satirizing modern hip hop tropes by bragging about his increasingly ridiculous sexual encounters, which finishes off the Words Words Words section of the special. He returns for an encore, performing “I’m Bo Yo”, bragging about how he is the greatest rapper ever while mocking rap music, and “Love Is…”, an absurd sardonic love song. The audience gives a final round of applause as Bo waves and walks off the stage, ending the taped show.

== Stand-up show ==
Burnham debuted his stand-up routine, Words Words Words, at the Boston House of Blues on May 21, 2010 (postponed from April 16, 2010). This was recorded as the inaugural performance of Comedy Central's "House of Comedy Live from House of Blues" series. Burnham shared his debut evening at the House of Blues with fellow stand-up comedian Myq Kaplan. The one-hour special of Words Words Words aired on October 16, 2010, to over 700,000 viewers, and was released on an unrated one-disc DVD three days later (October 19). As of December 2010, Burnham was the youngest artist to garner his own hour-long special on Comedy Central. The DVD is presented in anamorphic widescreen and Dolby Digital 5.1 surround sound and has, in addition to the special, two music videos for the songs "Words, Words, Words" and "Oh Bo".

In August 2010, Burnham was nominated for "Best Comedy Show" at the 2010 Edinburgh Comedy Awards—"the world’s most prestigious comedy prize" with a £10,000 cash prize—after his performance of Words Words Words at the 2010 Edinburgh Fringe Festival. He was instead awarded the "Panel Prize"—carrying a £5,000 prize—for "the show or act who has most captured the comedy spirit of the 2010 Fringe".

== Album ==
Words Words Words was released by Comedy Central Records as a music download on both Amazon.com and the iTunes Store on October 18, 2010, and on a single Compact Disc on October 19, 2010. All live tracks for the CD were recorded at Carolines on Broadway on June 30, 2010.

== Track listing ==
No.	Title	Length
1.	"Words, Words, Words" (Studio)	4:00
2.	"Oh Bo" (Studio)	5:04
3.	"What's Funny"	4:38
4.	"Ex-Girlfriend/Racial Humor"	1:46
5.	"Men & Women"	3:07
6.	"One Man Shows"	4:48
7.	"Ironic"	3:08
8.	"Binary Reality"	2:41
9.	"Words Words Words"	3:51
10.	"A Prayer/How Do We Fix Africa?"	1:19
11.	"Haikus/Sonnet/Shakespeare"	7:29
12.	"Rant"	3:36
13.	"Theoretical Dick Jokes/Statistics"	3:22
14.	"Art Is Dead"	2:32
15.	"Traditional Stand-Up"	2:25
16.	"Oh Bo"	4:59

== Reception ==
Professional ratings
Review scores
Source	Rating
About.com	2.5/5 stars
Allmusic	4/5 stars
DVD Talk	(3.7/5)

Critical response to Words Words Words, both the album and DVD, has been mostly positive. Francis Rizzo III, of DVD Talk, praises Words Words Words, citing Burnham's excellent wordplay coupled with an age-defying stage presence and fluidity. SanDiego.com's Gordon Downs spoke highly of Words Words Words; after describing the two studio songs as "sounding like a modern day Ray Stevens coupled with the slick production of a Yes album", Downs lauded the live set's flow and energy and Burnham's skill with his material. Bill Brownstein of Montreal's The Gazette praised Burnham's wit claiming "[h]e could be the love child of Allen Ginsberg and George Carlin. And there's no telling what kind of comedy monster he can morph into by the time he hits 30 – even 25."

Allmusic's David Jeffries said of the album, "...if you happen to enjoy the way Burnham turns from erudite to ignorant on a dime, then Words Words Words is the gift that keeps on giving. Things move fast in this act, giving the home listeners a distinct advantage over the audience captured here, who often seem to be laughing five seconds after the fact as they unravel the wordplay. ... Hilarious, plus you get the thrill of feeling smug and horrible at the very same time."

About.com's Patrick Bromley again praised Burnham's dense wordplay and cleverness, but felt that the artist was simply re-treading the same ground without making any significant advances. Whereas Bromley saw Burnham's from-the-bedroom charm as a boon to 2009's Bo Burnham, he opined the re-invention as a self-aware brash wunderkind was not an improvement. In contrast to any perceived deficiencies in the music, Bromley felt the traditional stand-up tracks to be the distinguishing factor of the album.

=== Chart positions ===
The Words Words Words album is Burnham's first album to break into the Billboard top 40 charts, and sold over 10,000 copies in its first week. However, on the second week, the album fell 121 places to number 161 (selling only 3,000 copies).

Chart (2010)	Peak position
US Billboard Comedy	1
US Billboard Independent Albums	3
US Billboard Digital Albums	11
US Billboard 200	40
