= Bo fo Sho =

EP by Bo Burnham
- Released: June 17, 2008
- Genre: Comedy
- Length: 18:18
- Label: Comedy Central Records
- Producer: Jack Vaughn Jr.

Bo Burnham chronology
| Bo fo Sho (2008) | Bo Burnham (2009) |

Bo fo Sho is the first EP released by American comedian Bo Burnham. The six-track comedy EP was released on June 17, 2008 by Comedy Central Records, and charted well across the Billboard charts.

== Production ==
After performing on Comedy Central's The World Stands Up in January 2008, Burnham signed a four-record deal with their label, Comedy Central Records. In a June 2008 interview with Wired, Burnham described himself as "still a kid in his bedroom, writing songs and playing them" and that if Bo fo Sho were anything else, "it would lose the whole DIY effect of how I started out."

During a 2008 show in Boston, Burnham joked that the song "Sunday School"—wherein he adopts the persona of an "overly exuberant" Sunday school teacher—was the reason he waited until after graduating from the all-boys Catholic high school, St. John's Preparatory, before releasing his EP.

== Track listing ==
1. "Bo' fo' Sho'" – 2:48
  - Originally debuted on YouTube, September 24, 2007
2. "H-O-A-R" – 2:46
3. "High School Party (Girl)" – 2:40
  - Burnham recorded an accompanying music video in high-definition for the iTunes Store in 2008.
4. "3.14 Apple Pi" – 3:30
  - Described by The Boston Globe's Joseph P. Kahn as "gangsta rap [dragged] down alleyways even Snoop Dogg would fear to tread."
    Originally debuted on YouTube, March 10, 2007
5. "Sunday School" – 2:40
6. "My Whole Family..." – 3:54
  - The cult hit that "propelled Burnham to Internet stardom"; originally debuted on YouTube, December 21, 2006

== Reception ==
Bo fo Sho sold over 20,000 copies in its first three months, and as of February 2009 continued to be a strong seller.

=== Chart positions ===
| Chart (2008) | Peak position |
|---|---|
| U.S. Billboard Top Heatseekers | 2 |
| U.S. Billboard Top Comedy Albums | 3 |
