= Bo Burnham (album) =

Live album by Bo Burnham
- Released: March 10, 2009
- Recorded: September 18–21, 2008; Tempe Improv, Tempe, Arizona (live portions)
- Genre: Comedy
- Length: 42:35
- Label: Comedy Central Records
- Producer: Jack Vaughn Jr.

Bo Burnham chronology
Bo fo Sho (2008)	Bo Burnham (2009)	Words Words Words (2010)

Bo Burnham is the debut studio album by American comedian Bo Burnham. Released on March 10, 2009 by Comedy Central Records, the 2-disc album contains the Compact Disc musical album, and a DVD with Burnham's Comedy Central Presents special, all of his YouTube videos, and other performances.

In a 2009 interview with The A.V. Club, Burnham explained that most songs on the album were similar to his YouTube videos because "I wanted it to still have this very small, homegrown, kid-in-his-bedroom feel. I wanted to show respect for the online community". The live portions of the album were performed and recorded at Burnham's September 18–21, 2008 gig at the Tempe Improv in Tempe, Arizona.

== Track listing ==
1. "I'm Bo Yo" (Studio) – 3:55
2. "My Whole Family..." – 3:58
  - The cult hit that "propelled Burnham to Internet stardom"; originally debuted on YouTube, December 21, 2006.
3. "Bo Fo Sho" – 3:08
  - Originally debuted on YouTube, September 24, 2007
4. "Love is..." – 3:58
5. "The Perfect Woman" – 3:26
6. "High School Party" – 2:52
  - Burnham recorded an accompanying music video for the iTunes Store in 2008.
7. "Klan Kookout" – 2:45
8. "New Math" – 3:36
9. "I'm Bo Yo" (Live) – 3:31
10. "A Love Ballad" – 2:33
11. "Rehab Center For Fictional Characters" (Studio) – 3:19
12. "Welcome To YouTube" (Studio) – 3:33
13. "Bonus Track" (Hidden track) – 2:01

Notes

- "The Perfect Woman" and "Klan Kookout" have since been removed from digital platforms.
- "Bonus Track" is a hidden track.
- In August 2025, after "The Perfect Woman" and "Klan Kookout" were accidentally restored on digital platforms but later removed again less than a month later, the release date has been falsely changed to the date of Bo fo Sho. This has not been corrected.

=== DVD ===
The DVD accompanying Bo Burnham contains an uncensored version of Burnham's Comedy Central Presents episode, the music video for "High School Party", his original videos from YouTube, his live 10-minute performance at the Tempe Improv, and a tour of his house which was previously exclusively on Comedy Centrals website.

== Reception ==
Professional ratings
Review scores
Source	Rating
About.com	3/5 stars

Critical response to Bo Burnham has been mostly positive. Punchline magazine's John Delery praised both album and artist, calling the former "hysterical", and the latter as "the sole teenager in America these days that can speak in longhand." About.com's Patrick Bromley spoke well of Bo Burnham within its genre of musical comedy, saying that while the novelty or shock value of the traditional comedy album wore thin with repeated listenings, Bo Burnham was so dense with wordplay and double entendres that it begged for repeats. Though Bromley was less generous with Burnham's "edgy humor", he felt the teenaged comedian worked best with his self-deprecating material.

The Recording Industry Association of America (RIAA) certified Bo Burnham gold (video longform, for having sold 50,000 units) on May 27, 2010.

=== Chart positions ===
Chart (2009)	Peak position
U.S. Billboard 200	105
U.S. Billboard Heatseekers Albums	1
U.S. Billboard Independent Albums	12
Chart (2010)	Peak position
U.S. Billboard Comedy Albums	1
