= The Remains of Tom Lehrer =

Box set by Tom Lehrer
- Released: 2000
- Genre: Comedy songs

The Remains of Tom Lehrer is a box set containing all the songs from musical satirist Tom Lehrer's previous albums along with previously unreleased songs and his works featured on the public television show The Electric Company. Some of the songs from his debut album, Songs by Tom Lehrer, were re-recorded for the CD. The box set was released in 2000 and also includes a booklet with an introduction by Dr. Demento, pictures of various album covers and song books, reprints of the Mad magazine, prints of some of his songs, an extensive question-and-answer session and other information.

In 2020, Lehrer donated all of his lyrics and music written by him to the public domain. He followed this on November 1, 2022 with all recording and performing rights of any kind, making all of his music that he has originally composed or performed free for anyone to use.

== Track listing ==
=== Disc 1: Studio Recordings with Piano ===
- Songs by Tom Lehrer, More of Tom Lehrer, and Recent Recordings
1. Fight Fiercely, Harvard
2. The Old Dope Peddler
3. Be Prepared
4. The Wild West Is Where I Want to Be
5. I Wanna Go Back to Dixie
6. Lobachevsky
7. The Irish Ballad
8. The Hunting Song
9. My Home Town
10. When You Are Old and Gray
11. I Hold Your Hand in Mine
12. The Wiener Schnitzel Waltz
13. Poisoning Pigeons in the Park
14. Bright College Days
15. A Christmas Carol
16. The Elements
17. Oedipus Rex
18. In Old Mexico
19. Clementine
20. It Makes a Fellow Proud to Be a Soldier
21. She's My Girl
22. The Masochism Tango
23. We Will All Go Together When We Go
24. I Got It from Agnes (1997)
25. That's Mathematics (1993)

=== Disc 2: Live Performances ===
- Tom Lehrer Revisited, An Evening Wasted with Tom Lehrer
1. Introduction
2. I Wanna Go Back to Dixie
3. The Wild West Is Where I Want to Be
4. The Old Dope Peddler
5. Fight Fiercely, Harvard
6. Lobachevsky
7. The Irish Ballad
8. The Hunting Song
9. My Home Town
10. When You Are Old and Gray
11. The Wiener Schnitzel Waltz
12. I Hold Your Hand in Mine
13. Be Prepared
14. Poisoning Pigeons in the Park
15. Bright College Days
16. A Christmas Carol
17. The Elements
18. Oedipus Rex
19. In Old Mexico
20. Clementine
21. It Makes a Fellow Proud to Be a Soldier
22. She's My Girl
23. The Masochism Tango
24. We Will All Go Together When We Go

=== Disc 3: More Live Performances + Studio Recordings With Orchestra ===
- That Was the Year That Was, The Richard Hayman Sessions (1960), The Joe Raposo Sessions (for The Electric Company) (1971-72), The Rob Fisher Sessions (New Recordings, 1999)
1. National Brotherhood Week
2. MLF Lullaby
3. George Murphy
4. The Folk Song Army
5. Smut
6. Send The Marines
7. Pollution
8. So Long, Mom (A Song for World War III)
9. Whatever Became Of Hubert?
10. New Math
11. Alma
12. Who's Next?
13. Wernher von Braun
14. The Vatican Rag
15. Poisoning Pigeons in the Park
16. The Masochism Tango
17. The Hunting Song
18. We Will All Go Together When We Go
19. L-Y
20. Silent E
21. O-U (The Hound Song)
22. S-N (Snore, Sniff, And Sneeze)
23. N Apostrophe T
24. Selling Out
25. (I'm Spending) Hanukkah in Santa Monica
