= Songs & More Songs by Tom Lehrer =

Compilation album by Tom Lehrer
- Released: May 6, 1997
- Recorded: 1953, 1959, 1960, 1996
- Genre: Satire
- Label: Rhino Records; R2 72776
- Producer: Tom Lehrer, David McLees, Barry Hansen, Bill Inglot (reissue producers)

Tom Lehrer chronology
That Was "That Was The Week That Was" (1981)	Songs & More Songs by Tom Lehrer (1997)	The Remains of Tom Lehrer (2000)

Songs & More Songs by Tom Lehrer is a reissue of musical satirist Tom Lehrer's two studio albums (Songs by Tom Lehrer and More of Tom Lehrer), combined with other studio sessions and a newly recorded version of "I Got It From Agnes". "Agnes" was a song from Lehrer's early live repertoire which he "polished up" for the Cameron Mackintosh-produced musical revue Tomfoolery in 1981, but which Lehrer himself never professionally recorded until 1996. The booklet notes include an essay by Dr. Demento and the original sleeve notes from the LP releases.

The material from Songs and More of... were the original versions self-issued on Lehrer Records, the 1966 Reprise rerecording of Songs not considered for the reissue. Although More of... was originally released in both monophonic and stereo versions, the producers of the reissue opted for the mono mix.

== Track listing ==
Songs & More Songs by Tom Lehrer – Standard edition
No.	Title	Notes	Length
1.	"Fight Fiercely, Harvard"		1:25
2.	"The Old Dope Peddler"		1:27
3.	"Be Prepared"		1:32
4.	"The Wild West Is Where I Want to Be"		2:03
5.	"I Wanna Go Back to Dixie"		1:54
6.	"Lobachevsky"		3:11
7.	"The Irish Ballad"		3:01
8.	"The Hunting Song"		1:19
9.	"My Home Town"		2:39
10.	"When You Are Old and Gray"		1:52
11.	"I Hold Your Hand in Mine"		1:28
12.	"The Wiener Schnitzel Waltz"		1:56
13.	"Poisoning Pigeons in the Park"		2:13
14.	"Bright College Days"		2:06
15.	"A Christmas Carol"		1:43
16.	"The Elements"		1:26
17.	"Oedipus Rex"		1:40
18.	"In Old Mexico"		4:08
19.	"Clementine"		4:18
20.	"It Makes a Fellow Proud to Be a Soldier"		2:40
21.	"She's My Girl"		1:49
22.	"The Masochism Tango"		3:03
23.	"We Will All Go Together When We Go"		3:29
24.	"Poisoning Pigeons in the Park"	Orchestrated version	2:08
25.	"The Masochism Tango"	Orchestrated version	2:55
26.	"The Hunting Song"	Orchestrated version	1:50
27.	"We Will All Go Together When We Go"	Orchestrated version; previously unreleased	2:42
28.	"I Got It from Agnes"	Previously unreleased	1:45
Total length:			63:42

=== Session notes ===
The orchestral versions on tracks 24–27 were from a January 21, 1960 session with accompaniment conducted by Richard Hayman. Tracks 24 and 25 were originally issued as a single on Capricorn Records, while track 26 was first issued on the 1997 Rhino compilation Dr. Demento 25th Anniversary Collection. Track 28 was recorded on October 8, 1996.
