= Tomfoolery (musical) =

1980-1981 Musical revue

- Original London Cast Recording
- Music: Tom Lehrer
- Lyrics: Tom Lehrer
- Book: Cameron Mackintosh
- Productions: 1980 West End; 1981 Off Broadway

Tomfoolery (or Tom Foolery) is a musical revue based on the songs of American satirist Tom Lehrer.

Devised and produced by Cameron Mackintosh, it premiered in London at the Criterion Theatre, directed by Gillian Lynne, on 5 June 1980, where it had a successful run. It subsequently opened on December 14, 1981 Off-Broadway at the Top of the Gate in Greenwich Village, New York, where it ran for 120 performances. The cast included Jonathan Hadary. Lehrer himself was brought in as a consultant.

The revue features 28 of Lehrer's satirical songs that were written in the 1950s and 1960s, known for their "witty naughtiness". Stage directions suggest each actor use their own name and wait onstage in a bar area while the others perform.

Two cast recordings have been released, one by the original London cast (Robin Ray, Jonathan Adams, Martin Connor and Tricia George), the other much rarer one by the Canadian cast.

== Song list ==
Act 1

- Be Prepared
- Poisoning Pigeons In The Park
- I Wanna Go Back To Dixie
- My Home Town
- Pollution
- Bright College Days
- Fight Fiercely, Harvard
- The Elements
- The Folk Song Army
- In Old Mexico
- She's My Girl
- When You Are Old And Gray
- Wernher Von Braun
- Who's Next?
- I Got It From Agnes
- National Brotherhood Week

Act 2

- So Long, Mom (A Song For World War III)
- The Hunting Song
- The Irish Ballad
- Smut
- New Math
- Silent E
- George Murphy
- Oedipus Rex
- I Hold Your Hand In Mine
- The Masochism Tango
- The Old Dope Peddler
- The Vatican Rag
- We Will All Go Together When We Go

The following two songs are optional:

- Send The Marines
- The Wiener Schnitzel Waltz
