= Georg Kreisler =

Austrian–American cabarettist, satirist, composer and author

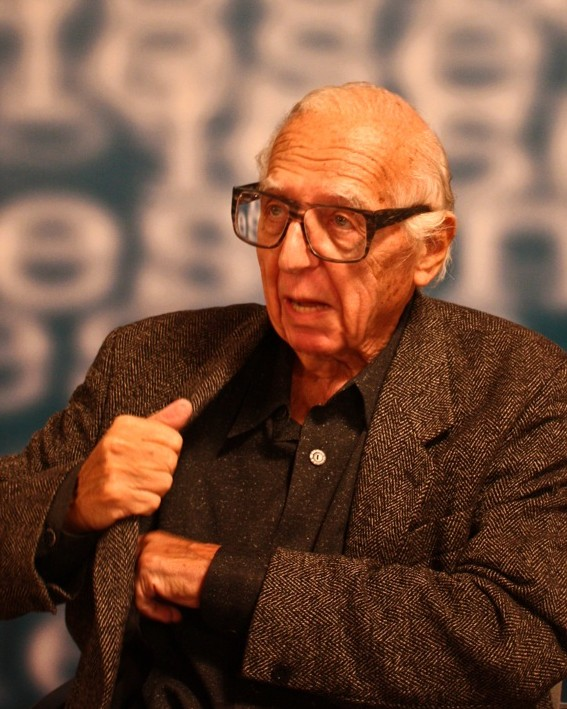
- Georg Kreisler, October 2009
- Born: 18 July 1922; Vienna, Austria
- Died: 22 November 2011 (aged 89); Salzburg, Austria
- Occupations: pianist, composer, singer-songwriter, writer
- Years active: 1944–2011, retired as singer 2001
- Spouses: Philine Hollaender (1941–1946); Mary Greenwood (1950–1957); Topsy Küppers (1960–1978); Barbara Peters (1985–2011, his death)

Georg Kreisler (18 July 1922 – 22 November 2011) was an Austrian–American Viennese-language cabarettist, satirist, composer, and author. He was particularly popular in the 1950s and 1960s. From 2007 he lived in Salzburg, Austria, with his fourth wife, Barbara Peters. He died there on 22 November 2011 "after a severe infection," according to his wife Barbara.

== Life ==
Kreisler went to high school in Vienna, where he studied music theory, and learned to play violin and piano. In 1938, he was forced to flee with his parents due to increasing Nazi restrictions on Jews. In 1941, he married Philine Hollaender, daughter of Friedrich Hollaender and Blandine Ebinger. In 1943, he became an American citizen. He enlisted in the Army, trained at Camp Ritchie, and was stationed in Europe. He wrote songs for soldiers in Britain and France with the help of Marcel Prawy. After the war, he went to Hollywood and worked on movies with Charlie Chaplin. He performed at nightclubs and bars to make ends meet. In 1947, he was rejected by the record companies because his songs were "un-American", especially songs with titles such as "Please Shoot Your Husband". In 1955, he returned to Europe, first to Vienna, then Munich in 1958, Berlin in 1976, Salzburg in 1988, Basel in 1992, and back to Salzburg in 2007. He died at the age of 89 in 2011.

== Style ==
Kreisler is considered a master of language. His songs are characterized by black humour and uncompromising criticism of society and politics. This caused him many difficulties and also contributed to appearance prohibitions in radio and television.

Despite producing several hundred original songs Kreisler may occasionally have used ideas and material from other artists in his work. His song "Die Hand" shows strong similarities to Tom Lehrer's "I Hold Your Hand in Mine", first recorded by Lehrer in 1953 on the album Songs by Tom Lehrer. Lehrer's recording predates by several years any documented recording or performance of that song by Kreisler as well as Kreisler's return to performance in German-speaking countries in 1955. The title of Kreisler's "Taubenvergiften im Park" (first released as "Frühlingslied") is literally a German version of Lehrer's "Poisoning Pigeons in the Park". Kreisler and Lehrer each deny copying from the other; so far no one has succeeded in establishing which song was written first. Kreisler's "Das Mädchen mit den drei blauen Augen" appears to be related to the Abe Burrows song "The Girl with the Three Blue Eyes" (first recording 1950). Kreisler's song "Bidla Buh" (first recorded in the 1950s) appears to be related to the Rodgers and Hart number "To Keep My Love Alive" composed in 1943.
