= Lobachevsky (disambiguation) =

Nikolai Lobachevsky (1792–1856) was a Russian mathematician.

Lobachevsky (Лобачевский; also Lobachevskij and Lobachevskiy; feminine: Lobachevskaya), a Russian-language surname, may also refer to:

- 1858 Lobachevskij, a main-belt asteroid
- N. I. Lobachevsky State University of Nizhny Novgorod or Lobachevsky University, Novgorod Oblast, Russia
- Lobachevskiy (crater), a crater on the Moon
- Lobachevsky Prize, including the Lobachevsky Medal
- Lobachevsky function, also called the Clausen function
- "Lobachevsky" (song), a humorous song by Tom Lehrer
- Hyperbolic geometry, also called Lobachevskian geometry

== See also ==
- Łobaczewski (surname), the Polish-language equivalent of the surname
