= Songs by Tom Lehrer =

Album by Tom Lehrer

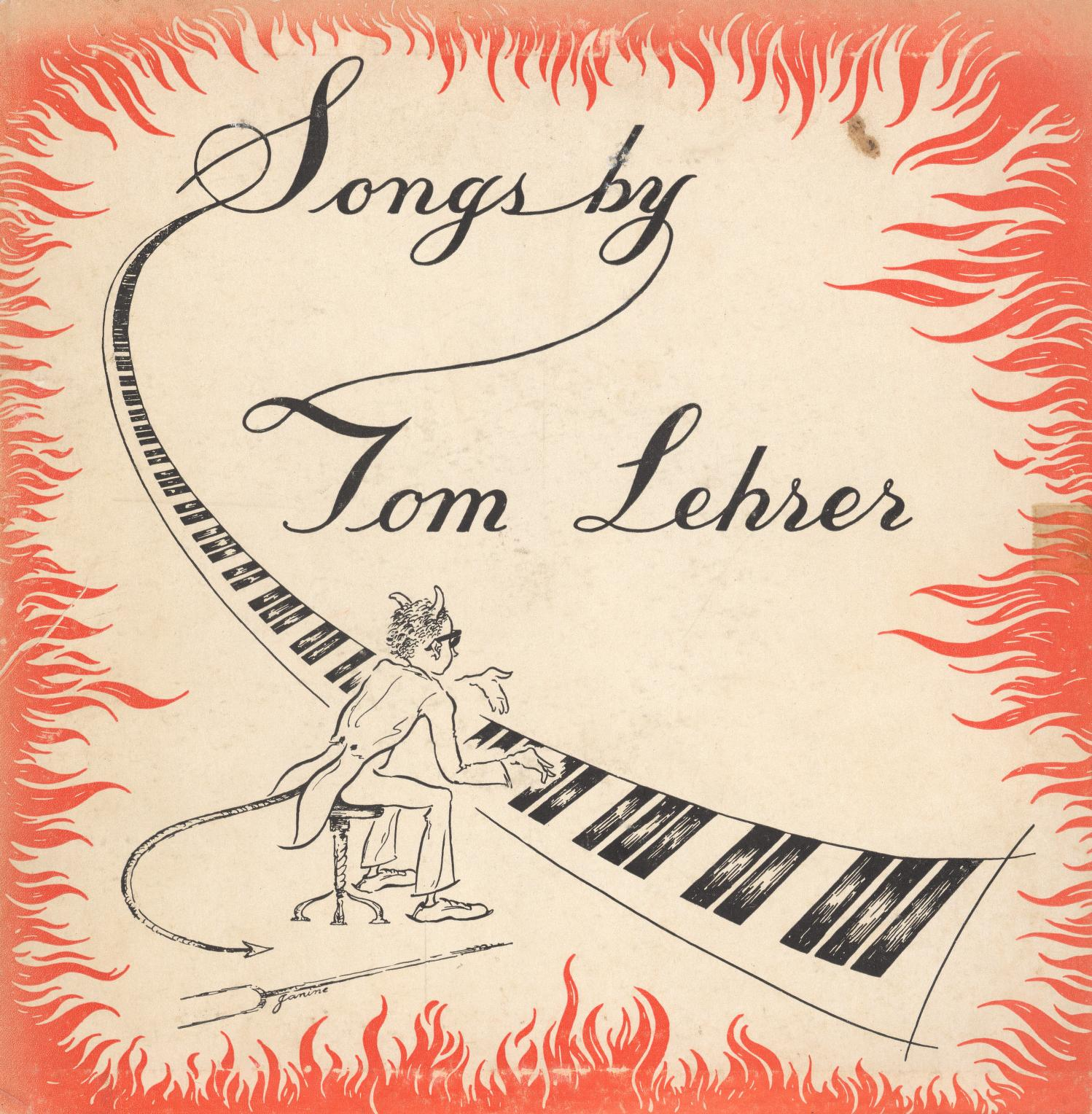

Studio album by Tom Lehrer
- Released: 1953
- Recorded: January 22, 1953
- Genre: Satire
- Length: 23:42
- Label: Lehrer Records
- Producer: Tom Lehrer

Tom Lehrer chronology
| Songs by Tom Lehrer (1953) | An Evening Wasted with Tom Lehrer (1959) |

Songs by Tom Lehrer is the debut album by musical satirist Tom Lehrer, released in 1953 on his own label, Lehrer Records. In 2004, it was included into the National Recording Registry.

== Production and release history ==
Songs by Tom Lehrer was recorded in a single one-hour session on January 22, 1953, at the TransRadio studio in Boston for the total studio cost of $15. The first pressing was an issue of 400 copies, produced at Lehrer's own expense in the 10" LP record format. Records were sold for $3.50, and later $3.95. Later releases were issued in 10" and 12" LP format.

The songs from Songs by Tom Lehrer were rerecorded for the 1960 live album Revisited. Songs by Tom Lehrer was re-released alongside Lehrer's second album, More of Tom Lehrer, as part of Songs & More Songs by Tom Lehrer in 1997 and as part of the 2000 box set The Remains of Tom Lehrer.

== Track listing ==
Side 1
| No. | Title | Audio | Length |
|---|---|---|---|
| 1. | "Fight Fiercely, Harvard" | | 1:26 |
| 2. | "The Old Dope Peddler" | | 1:27 |
| 3. | "Be Prepared" | | 1:33 |
| 4. | "The Wild West Is Where I Want to Be" | | 2:04 |
| 5. | "I Wanna Go Back to Dixie" | | 1:54 |
| 6. | "Lobachevsky" | | 3:12 |
| Total length: | | | 11:36 |

Side 2
| No. | Title | Audio | Length |
|---|---|---|---|
| 1. | "The Irish Ballad" | | 3:02 |
| 2. | "The Hunting Song" | | 1:19 |
| 3. | "My Home Town" | | 2:40 |
| 4. | "When You Are Old and Gray" | | 1:53 |
| 5. | "I Hold Your Hand in Mine" | | 1:28 |
| 6. | "The Wiener Schnitzel Waltz" | | 1:56 |
| Total length: | | | 12:18 |

== 1966 re-recording ==
In 1966, following the success of That Was the Year That Was, Reprise Records reissued several of Lehrer's previous LPs, but the company was dissatisfied with the technical quality of the original Songs album and persuaded Lehrer to make a new stereo recording of the album. However, in an attempt to make the songs more up to date, Lehrer made some noticeable changes in the lyrics that he later regretted and discarded. This version of the album has not been reissued on CD.

The Reprise version of the album featured a cartoon cover designed by Eric Martin, who also designed the That Was The Year That Was cover.

=== Track listing ===
Side 1

1. "I Wanna Go Back to Dixie"
2. "The Old Dope Peddler"
3. "When You Are Old and Gray"
4. "The Wild West"
5. "Fight Fiercely Harvard"
6. "Lobachevsky"

Side 2

1. "The Irish Ballad"
2. "The Hunting Song"
3. "My Home Town"
4. "The Wienerschnitzel Waltz"
5. "I Hold Your Hand in Mine"
6. "Be Prepared"

== Cover versions ==
During a period when Lehrer's original LP was hard to find (c. 1954), cover versions of all the songs on Songs by Tom Lehrer were released as Jack Eljan Sings Tom Lehrer's Song Satires. The album was performed by singer Jack Nagle under an easily deciphered assumed name. "Eljan"'s album was reissued in 1960 in the wake of Revisited's popularity.

Actor Dennis Hopper sings a line from "Be Prepared" ("'Be prepared'; that's the Boy Scouts' marching song") in the 1994 motion picture Speed.

In 2012, rapper 2 Chainz sampled "The Old Dope Peddler" for his song "Dope Peddler", from his album Based on a T.R.U. Story.
