= National Conference for Community and Justice =

American social justice organization

- Abbreviation: NCCJ
- Formation: 1927; 99 years ago
- Headquarters: Middletown, Connecticut
- Region served: United States
- Affiliations: National Federation for Just Communities
- Website: nccj.org
- Formerly called: National Conference of Jews and Christians

The National Conference for Community and Justice is an American social justice organization focused on fighting biases and promoting understanding between people of different races and cultures. The organization was founded in 1927 as the National Conference of Jews and Christians in response to anti-Semitism and anti-Catholic sentiment surrounding Al Smith's run for President. It has operated under its current name since 1998.

== History ==
This organization was established in 1927 by social activists, including Jane Addams and US Supreme Court Justice Charles Evans Hughes, to bring diverse people together to address interfaith divisions. In 1938, its name was modified to National Conference of Christians and Jews (NCCJ). Over the course of its history, the organization expanded its purview to all issues of social justice; in 1998, its name changed again, from "National Conference of Christians and Jews" to "National Conference for Community and Justice", keeping the same acronym NCCJ. A number of regional offices exist under the auspices of the National Federation for Just Communities.

== Programs and events ==
The NCCJ promoted inclusivity through various events and programs. One of the first was the "Tolerance Trio", a traveling roadshow which toured the country with a priest, a rabbi, and a clergyman, all making jokes and providing entertainment. Throughout its tenure, the NCCJ offered interfaith events, school-age programs, and youth leadership programs aimed at promoting values such as understanding, respect, and community building.

=== Anytown ===
The "Anytown" program began in the 1950s and was designed for youth ages 14–18. It was intended to educate and empower its participants through multi-day intensive retreats.

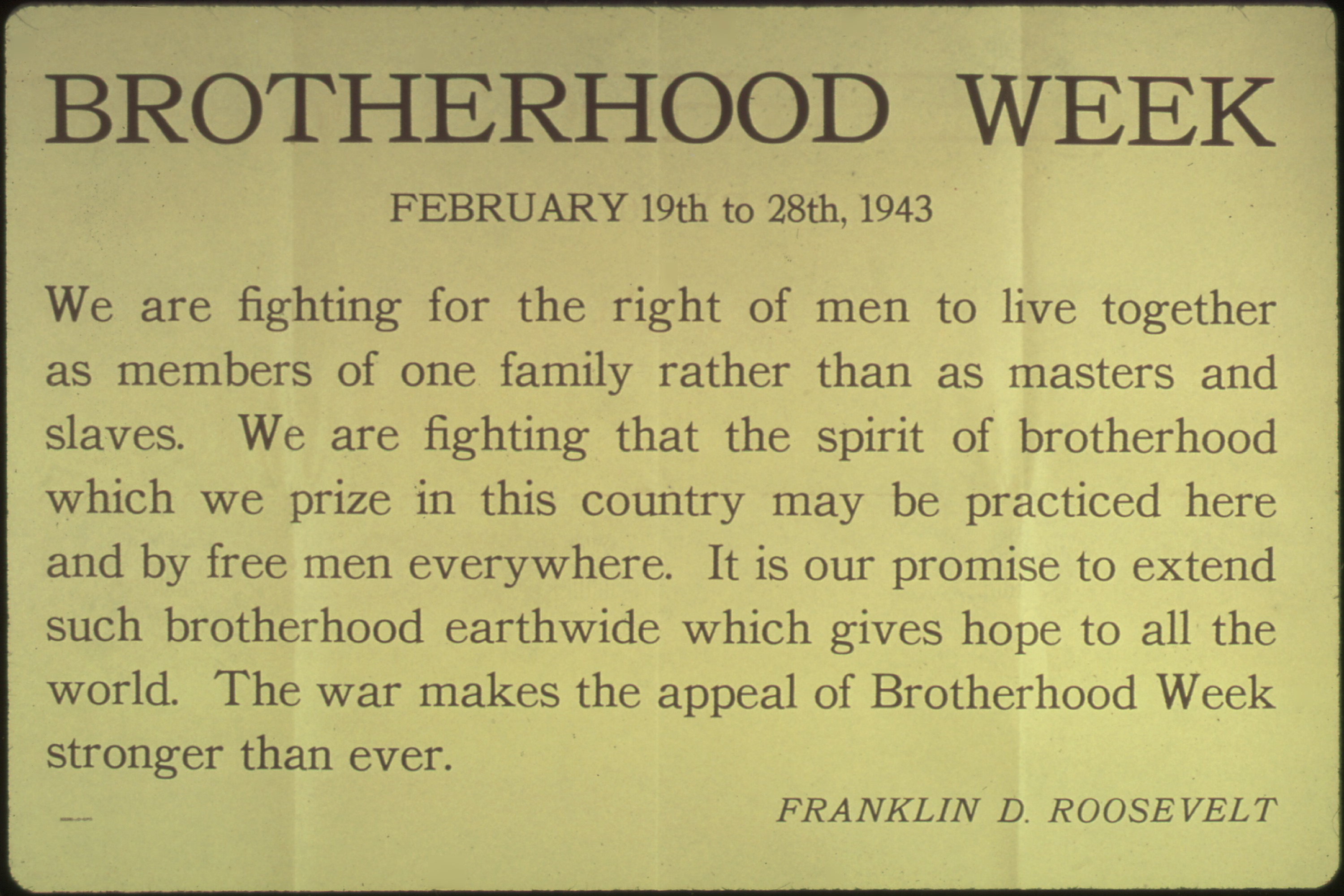
Remarks of Franklin D. Roosevelt for Brotherhood Week 1943

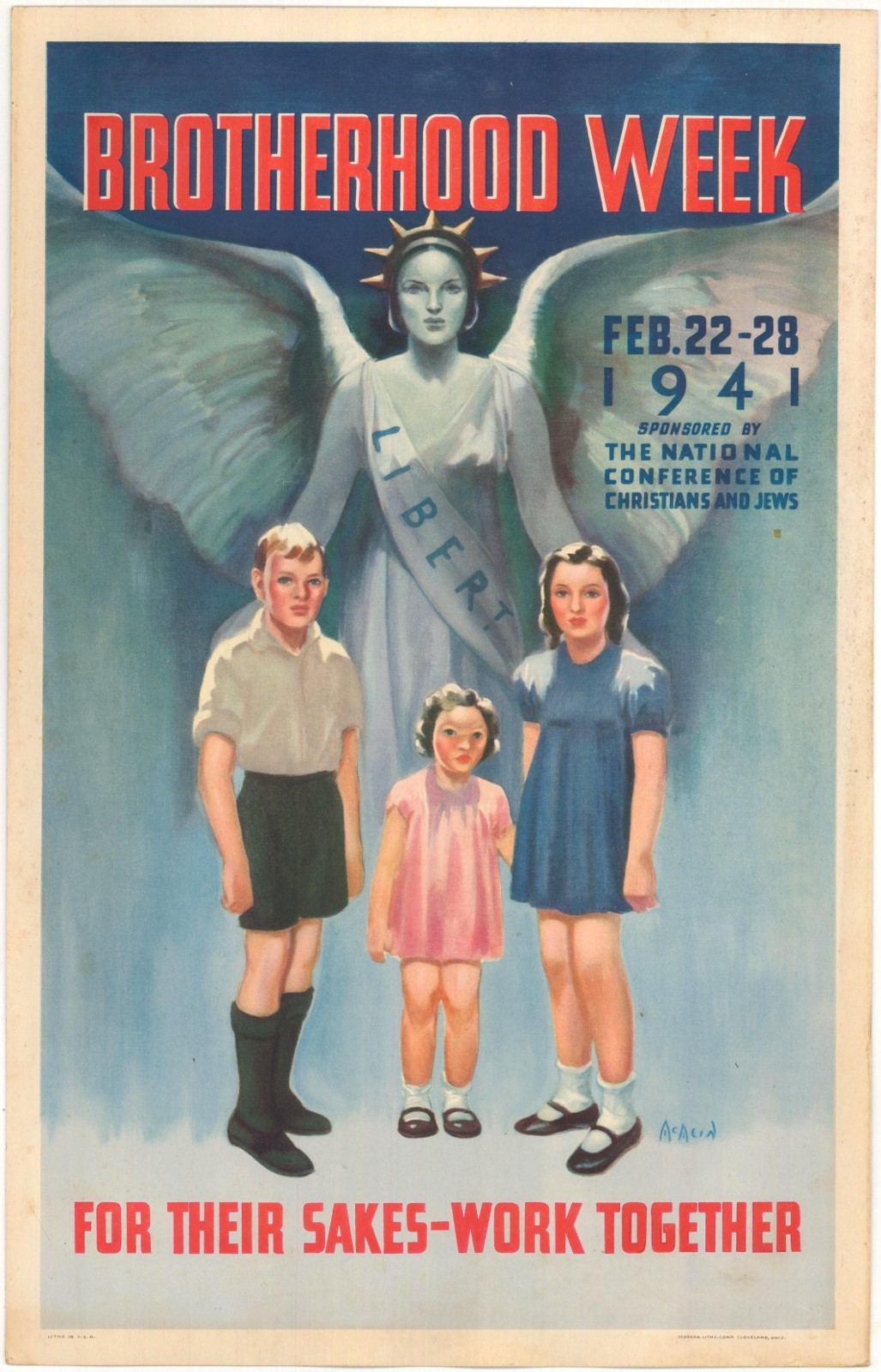
Poster advertising the 1941 Brotherhood Week.

=== Brotherhood Week ===
The NCCJ promoted a "National Brotherhood Day" in the 1930s, expanding to Brotherhood Week starting in 1936 with President Franklin D. Roosevelt named honorary chairman. In 1944 the week included extensive radio programming, military and USO participation, and an "education program of nationwide scope" aimed at "extending good will and understanding among religious groups". By the early 2000s the event had lost relevance and was eventually canceled.

Tom Lehrer satirized National Brotherhood Week in a 1965 song of the same name, recorded on his album That Was the Year That Was. He prefaced the song by remarking, "During National Brotherhood Week, various special events are arranged to drive home the message of brotherhood. This year, for example, on the first day of the week, Malcolm X was killed, which gives you an idea of how effective the whole thing is."

== See also ==
- Jane Addams
- S. Parkes Cadman
- Charles Evans Hughes
