= Who's Next (disambiguation) =

Who's Next is the fifth album by the British rock group The Who.

Who's Next may also refer to:

- "Who's Next", a 1965 song by Tom Lehrer from the album That Was the Year That Was
- Yahoo!'s Who's Next, a service offered by Yahoo! Music
- "Who Next", a 1993 song by Spragga Benz
- "Who's next?", the catchphrase of professional wrestler Bill Goldberg in World Championship Wrestling
