= New Math (disambiguation) =

The New Math was a brief, dramatic change in the way mathematics was taught in American grade schools, and to a lesser extent in European countries, during the 1960s.

New Math may also refer to:

- "New Math (song)", a satirical song by Tom Lehrer
- New Math, a song by Bo Burnham from the self-titled album Bo Burnham
- New Math, a song by Drive Like Jehu from their album Yank Crime
- The New Math(s), a short film by Hal Hartley
