= Revisited (Tom Lehrer album) =

Live album by Tom Lehrer
- Released: 1960
- Recorded: 1959–1960; 1971 (CD bonus tracks)
- Genres: Comedy; Satire
- Length: 41:02
- Labels: Lehrer Records; TL-201; Reprise/Warner Bros. 26203 (1990 CD reissue)
- Producers: Tom Lehrer; Joe Raposo

Tom Lehrer chronology
More of Tom Lehrer (1959)	Revisited (1960)	That Was the Year That Was (1965)

Revisited is a 1960 album by Tom Lehrer, consisting of live recordings of all the songs from 1953's Songs by Tom Lehrer. The CD reissue of the album contains two additional tracks that Lehrer wrote and performed for the PBS television show The Electric Company (and produced and conducted by Joe Raposo).

In October 2020, Lehrer transferred the music and lyrics for all songs he had ever written into the public domain. In November 2022, he formally relinquished the copyright and performing/recording rights on his songs, making all music and lyrics composed by him free for anyone to use.

== Track listing ==
1. "Introduction" – 3:27
2. "I Wanna Go Back to Dixie" – 2:56
3. "The Wild West is Where I Want to Be" – 2:31
4. "The Old Dope Peddler" – 1:42
5. "Fight Fiercely, Harvard" – 2:41
6. "Lobachevsky" – 4:19
7. "The Irish Ballad" – 5:13
8. "The Hunting Song" – 1:59
9. "My Home Town" – 2:58
10. "When You are Old and Grey" – 2:27
11. "The Wiener Schnitzel Waltz" – 2:21
12. "I Hold Your Hand in Mine" – 1:55
13. "Be Prepared" – 2:39
14. "L-Y" – 2:11 (CD bonus track)
15. "Silent E" – 1:30 (CD bonus track)

== Notes ==
On the original Lehrer Records release of Revisited, tracks 1–6 (side 1) were recorded live on November 23 & 24, 1959, in Kresge Auditorium at MIT in Cambridge, MA, while tracks 7–13 (side 2) were recorded live at two concerts during Lehrer's tour of Australia in spring 1960 (March 21 in Melbourne and May 4 in Sydney).

Because of issues with the sound quality of the Australian recordings, England's Decca Records assembled its release of the album solely from the MIT concert tapes. The Decca configuration was the basis for the 1990 Reprise/Warner Bros. CD reissue. The timings shown above are from the Decca release.

The cover photograph was taken at Royal Festival Hall in London, England, UK, after his performance there on June 29, 1960. Tracks 14 and 15 were recorded May 28, 1971, and December 14, 1972.

== See also ==
- Tom Lehrer
- An Evening Wasted with Tom Lehrer
- Songs By Tom Lehrer (album)

== See also ==
- Tom Lehrer
- An Evening Wasted with Tom Lehrer
- Songs By Tom Lehrer (album)
