= Topsy Küppers =

Austrian writer, singer and actress (1931–2025)

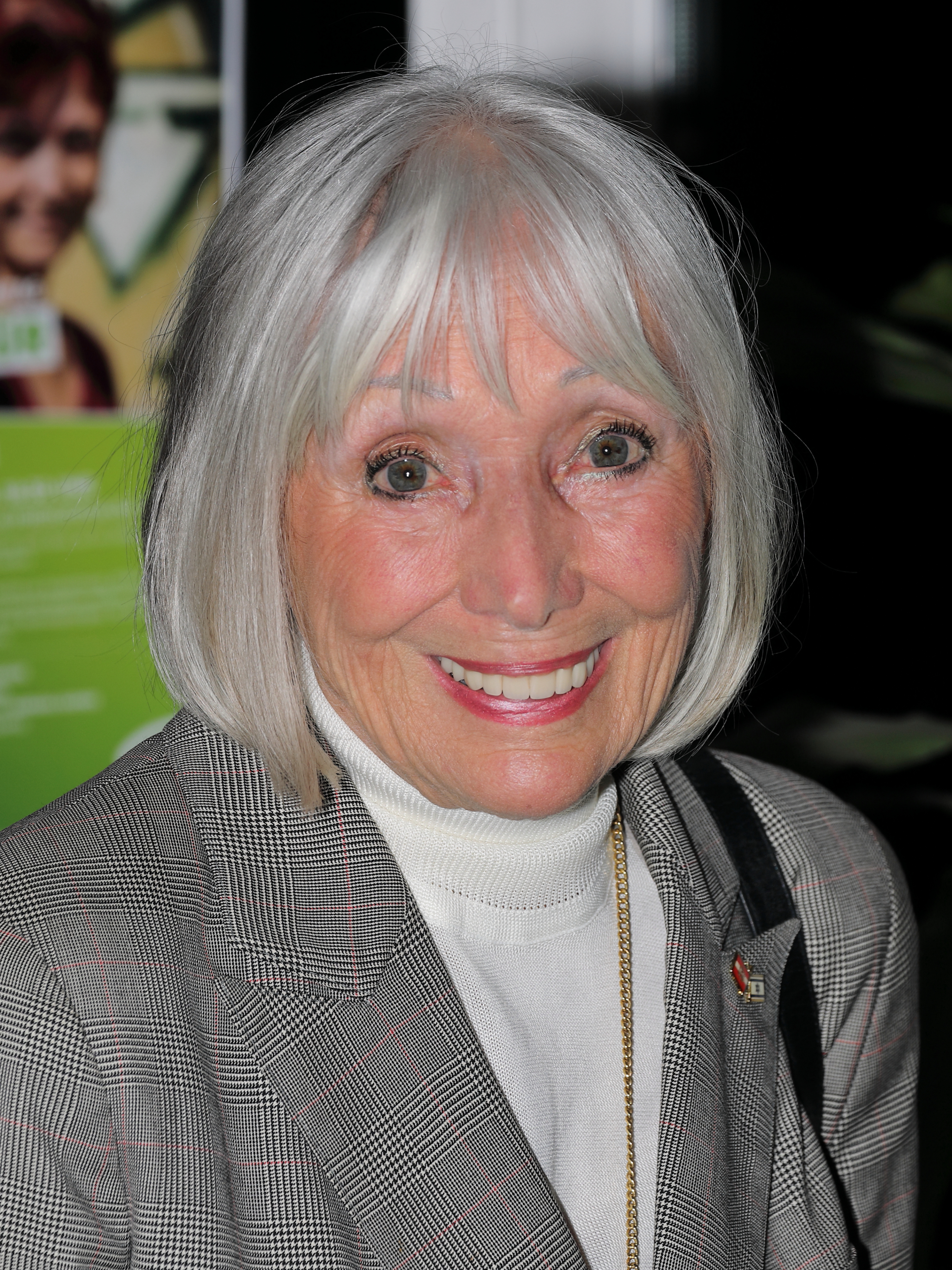
- Küppers in 2020
- Born: 17 August 1931; Aachen, Rhine Province, Prussia, Germany
- Died: 14 June 2025 (aged 93)
- Occupations: Actress; writer; singer; director

Topsy Küppers (17 August 1931 – 14 June 2025) was a German-born Austrian writer, singer, soubrette, actress and theatre director.

== Life and career ==
Born in Aachen, Germany, the foundation stone for Küppers' career as an actress was laid by Ursula Staudte, who taught her according to the so-called Stanislawski principle. However, according to her own statement, the greatest influence was Trude Hesterberg, who taught her the chanson and its interpretation. Küppers then took her exams at the Bühnengenossenschaft, which had Gustaf Gründgens on its board of examiners.

She worked on German stages and for German and Austrian television and from 1958 performed with her then husband Georg Kreisler in Munich, among other places.

On 17 December 1976 she opened the Freie Bühne Wieden in Vienna with four cabaret programmes, which was "dedicated to the preservation of Jewish literature and Jewish authors - both deceased and contemporary". She voluntarily directed at the theatre until January 2001, during this time fighting against misogyny, anti-Semitism and fascism with musical-literary programmes such as Gehackte Zores, Weit von wo and Amoureuses, Scandaleuses, Heiteres und so Weiteres.

=== Private life and death ===
Küppers is Jewish through her father, who left the family when she was one year old. During World War II, she hid in the Netherlands alongside her mother and grandmother.

"Topsy" is a nickname used by Küppers since childhood. Küppers kept her real first name secret throughout her entire life.

In 1965, Küppers took Austrian citizenship.

From her marriage to Georg Kreisler came her daughter Sandra Kreisler, who also works as a singer, speaker and actress, as well as a son. Kreisler and Topsy Küppers separated in the mid-1970s.

Küppers was married in second marriage to Karlheinz (called Carlos) Springer († 2013). In early August 2013, Küppers was diagnosed with colon cancer, which she described as "My Yucky-one" ("Mein Ungustl" = Translation of an untranslatable word, which stems from the Austrian dialect expression for "gross", repulsive or "yucky") and which she dealt with in the identically titled 2014 book.

Küppers died on 14 June 2025, at the age of 93.

== Awards ==
Küppers received awards at home and abroad for her work, including:

- 1967: Trude-Hesterberg-Ring as beste deutschsprachige chansonette
- 1976: Goldmedaille beim internationalen Konzertfestiaval Immer wieder Widerstand in Wiesbaden
- 1977: Kulturpreis der Stadt Wien
- 1984: Goldenes Verdienstzeichen des Landes Wien
- 1991: Ehrenmedaille der Bundeshauptstadt Wien in Silver
- 1992: Berufstitel Professor
- 1992: Bundesverdienstkreuz I. Classe of the Bundesrepublik Deutschland
- 1998: Austrian Decoration for Science and Art
- 2003: Goldene Emmerich-Kálmán-Medaille in Budapest für die auf Hungarian verfasste Emmerich Kálmán Biography Minden Álom Bésce Vezet (German: Alle Träumen führen nach Wien)
- 2011: Österreichisches Ehrenkreuz Wissenschaft und Kunst 1st Classe
- 2012: Ehrenbotschafterin der Stadt Aachen
- 2012: Ehrenzeichen für Verdienste um das Bundesland Niederösterreich (in appreciation of her outstanding artistic achievements)

== Discography ==
- Frivolitäten, LP (1963)
- Gehn ma Tauben vergiften, with Georg Kreisler, LP (1964)
- Die heiße Viertelstunde, with Georg Kreisler, LP (1968)
- Der Tod, das muß ein Wiener sein, with Georg Kreisler, LP/CD (1969/1994)
- Anders als die andern, with Georg Kreisler, LP (1969)
- Heute Abend: Lola Blau, Musical für eine Frau und zwei Klaviere von Georg Kreisler, Doppel-LP/CD (1971/1997)
- Komm… 12 schicke Schlager, LP (1971)
- Immer wieder Widerstand, LP (1973)
- Das Ungeheuer Zärtlichkeit, LP/CD (1974/2001)
- Spiegelbilder, LP (1980)
- Anny macht Moneye, (1987)
- Lieder nach Lust und Laune, LP (1989)
- Die Zunge der Kultur reicht weit. Lieder and text by Erich Kästner, CD (2007)
- Signale aus dem Jenseits, Gastrolle bei den drei ???, CD (2017)

== Books ==
- Freie Bühne Wieden. Einführung Topsy Küppers. Graphische Gestaltung Johann Hofmann. Freie Bühne Wieden, Vienna 1977.
- Erwin Brecher: Jedes Wort Gedankensport. Bearbeitet von Topsy Küppers und Elke Browne. htp, Vienna 1995, ISBN 3-7004-0684-3.
- Lauter liebe Leute. Ein dicker Brief an mein Publikum. Kremayr & Scheriau, Vienna 1996, ISBN 3-218-00621-X.
- Alle Träume führen nach Wien. Ein Tatsachenroman. Ibera, Vienna 2001, ISBN 3-85052-105-2.
- Wolf Messing. Hellseher und Magier. Langen Müller, Munich 2002, ISBN 3-7844-2880-0.
- Wenn dein Leben trist ist – erleuchte es mit Humor! Erlebtes – Erhörtes – Erdachtes … Ibera, Vienna 2009, ISBN 978-3-85052-273-1.
- Mein Ungustl. Ein widerlicher Gast. Langen Müller, Munich 2014, ISBN 978-3-7844-3366-0.
- Die Brüder Saphir. Ein Tatsachenroman. Verlag Der Apfel, Vienna 2018, ISBN 978-3-85450-779-6.

== Filmography ==
- 1954: Guitars of Love
- 1955: Three Girls from the Rhine
- 1955: La Gondola (TV)
- 1956: Die wilde Auguste
- 1956: Küß mich noch einmal
- 1956: Uns gefällt die Welt
- 1956: Hotel Allotria
- 1960: Der Liebesonkel (television recording from the Millowitsch-Theater)
- 1961: Paganini (TV)
- 1962: Gasparone (TV)
- 1963: Berlin-Melodie (tv)
- 1969: Ein Abend zu zweit (tv)
- 1972: Außenseiter (tv)
