= Łobaczewski =

Łobaczewski (feminine: Łobaczewska) is a Polish-language surname. Its Russian-language version is Lobachevski.

- Andrzej Łobaczewski, Polish psychiatrist
- Grażyna Łobaszewska, Polish vocalist and composer
- Stefania Łobaczewska, Polish musicologist
