= More of Tom Lehrer =

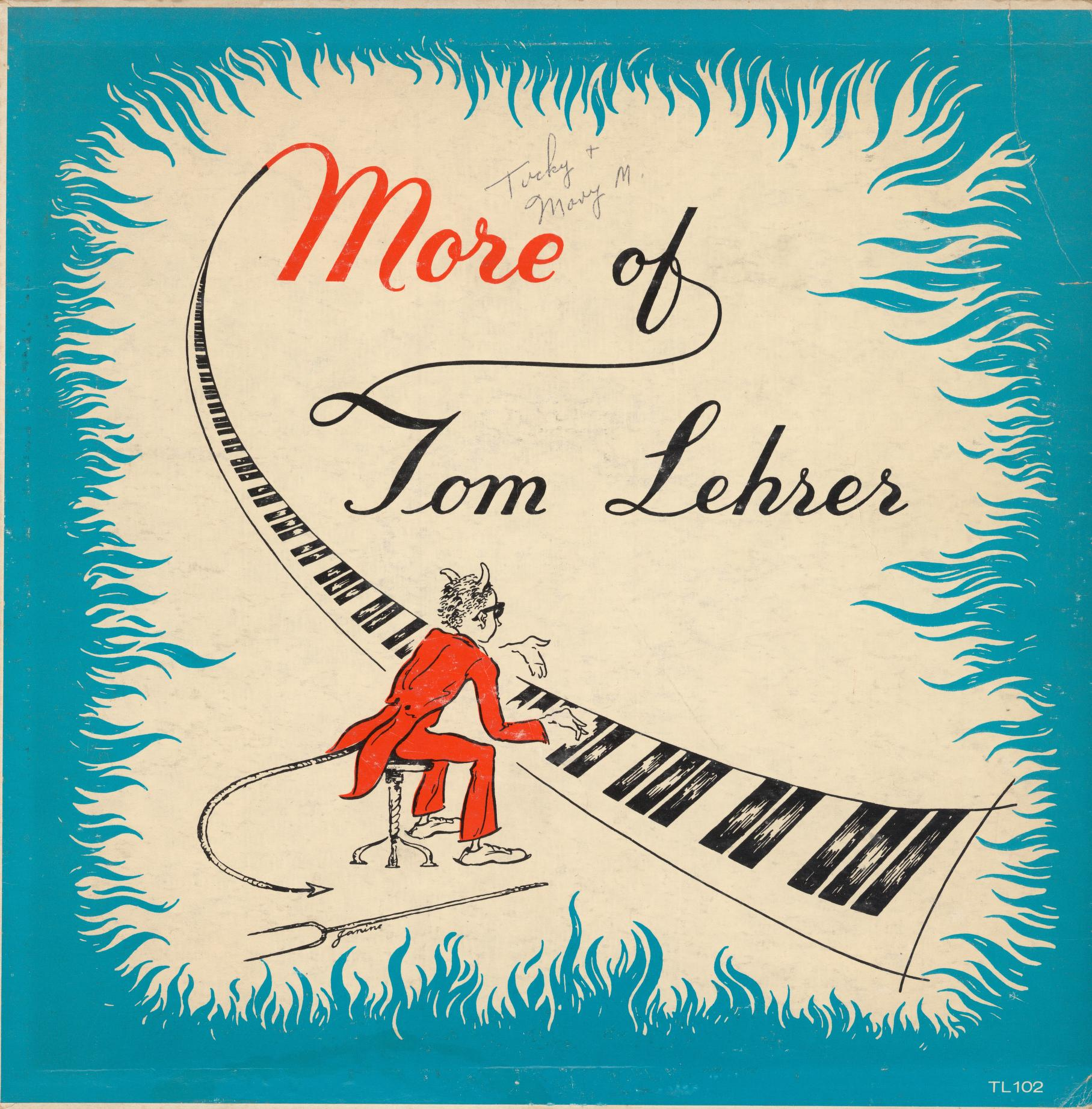

Studio album by Tom Lehrer
- Released: 1959
- Recorded: July 8, 1959
- Genre: Satire
- Length: 31:52
- Label: Lehrer Records; TL-102 (mono)/102S (stereo)
- Producer: Tom Lehrer

Tom Lehrer chronology
An Evening Wasted with Tom Lehrer (1959)	More of Tom Lehrer (1959)	Revisited (1960)

More of Tom Lehrer was the second and final studio album recorded by musical satirist Tom Lehrer. The LP contains the same songs (in the same sequence) as the live album An Evening Wasted with Tom Lehrer, which was recorded and released earlier in the same year. The album was recorded and mixed in a single three-hour session at the RCA Studios in New York on July 8, 1959.

When Reprise Records took over the distribution of Lehrer's works in the 1960s, they chose to represent Lehrer's 1959 material with the live versions of An Evening Wasted, and as a consequence More of... remained out of print for several decades. It was eventually reissued by Rhino Records as part of the 1997 album Songs & More Songs by Tom Lehrer and in the 2000 box set The Remains of Tom Lehrer. Although More of... was originally released in monophonic and stereo versions, the producers of the Rhino releases opted for the mono mix.

== Track listing ==
Side 1
No.	Title	Audio	Length
1.	"Poisoning Pigeons in the Park"		2:14
2.	"Bright College Days"		2:07
3.	"A Christmas Carol"		1:43
4.	"The Elements"		1:27
5.	"Oedipus Rex"		1:40
6.	"In Old Mexico"		4:09
Total length:			13:20

Side 2
No.	Title	Audio	Length
1.	"Clementine"		4:19
2.	"It Makes a Fellow Proud to Be a Soldier"		2:41
3.	"She's My Girl"		1:49
4.	"The Masochism Tango"		3:04
5.	"We Will All Go Together When We Go"		3:27
Total length:			15:20
