= Tom Lehrer =

American musician and mathematician (1928–2025)

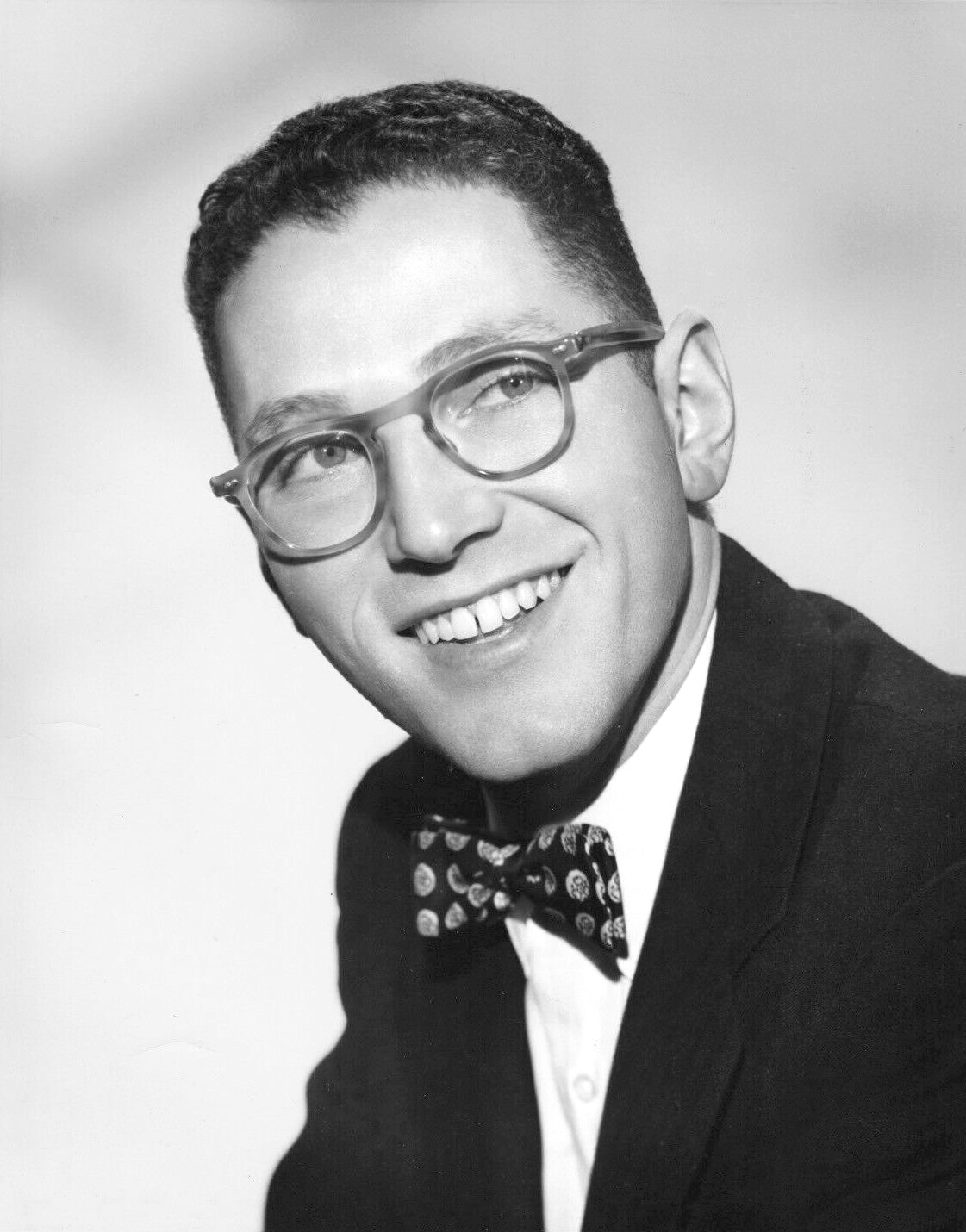
- Lehrer c. 1957
- Born: Thomas Andrew Lehrer; April 9, 1928; New York City, U.S.
- Died: July 26, 2025 (aged 97); Cambridge, Massachusetts, U.S.
- Education: Harvard University (AB, MA)
- Occupations: Musician; satirist; songwriter; mathematician; lecturer
- Years active: 1945–1973; 1980; 1998
- Musical career
- Genres: Novelty; satire; comedy; educational
- Instruments: Vocals; piano
- Labels: TransRadio; Lehrer; Reprise/Warner Bros.; Rhino/Atlantic; Shout! Factory; Needlejuice Records
- Website: tomlehrersongs.com

Thomas Andrew Lehrer (/ˈlɛərər/; April 9, 1928 – July 26, 2025) was an American musician and mathematician. He recorded pithy, humorous, and often political songs that became popular in the 1950s and 1960s. His songs parodied popular musical forms, often with original melodies.

Lehrer's early performances dealt with non-topical subjects and dark humor in songs such as "Poisoning Pigeons in the Park". In the 1960s, he produced songs about timely social and political issues, particularly for the U.S. version of the television show That Was the Week That Was. Lehrer quoted a friend's explanation: "Always predict the worst and you'll be hailed as a prophet." In the early 1970s, Lehrer largely retired from public performance to devote his time to teaching mathematics and musical theater history at the University of California, Santa Cruz.

== Early life ==
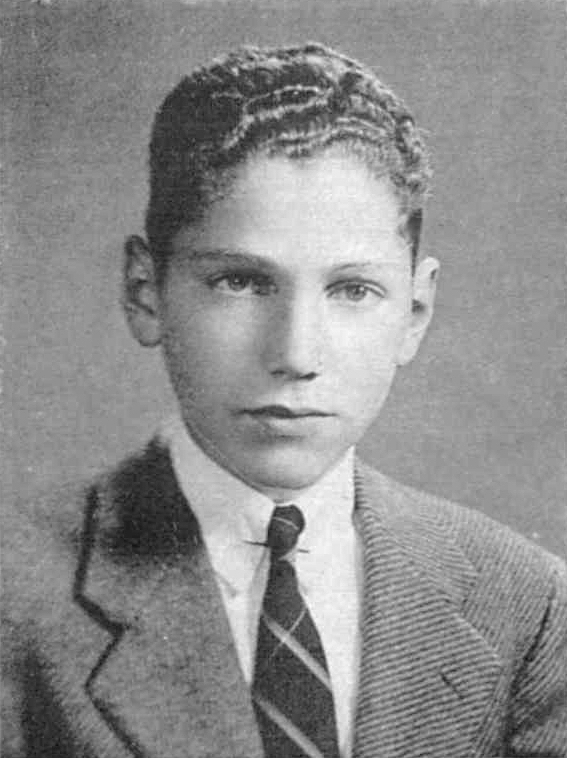
Lehrer in Loomis School's 1943 yearbook

Thomas Andrew Lehrer was born in New York City on April 9, 1928, and grew up on Manhattan's Upper East Side. He was the son of Morris James Lehrer (1897–1986), a successful necktie designer, and Anna Lehrer (née Waller; 1905–1978) and older brother of Barry Waller Lehrer (1930–2007). (Note: Lehrer's Harvard University friend Jeremy Bernstein wrote, "During the time I knew him, Lehrer spoke to me very little about his family. I had the feeling he was an only child, since he never spoke about any siblings... I am very familiar with the New York private high schools of that era, having attended one, so I know that anyone who went to Horace Mann must have been from a family that was comfortably well-off. I believe that his father manufactured ties... It was when he was fourteen that his parents got divorced.") Lehrer told an interviewer that he recalled an idyllic childhood on Manhattan's Upper West Side that included attending Broadway shows with his family and walking through Central Park day or night. He and his family were ethnically Jewish, following a generally secular lifestyle that included attending Jewish Sunday school but also celebrating Christmas; he remarked that his ties to Judaism were "more to do with the delicatessen than the synagogue (...) and 'God' was primarily an expletive(.)" As a child, he loved logic puzzles and math. He began taking classical piano lessons at the age of seven but was more interested in the popular music of the age. Eventually, his mother sent him to a piano teacher who taught him how to play the Broadway show tunes he loved. At this early age, he began writing show tunes, which eventually helped him as a satirical composer and writer in his years of lecturing at Harvard University and later at other universities.

Lehrer attended the Horace Mann School in Riverdale, part of the Bronx borough of New York. He also attended Camp Androscoggin, both as a camper and a counselor. Stephen Sondheim had Tom Lehrer as a camp counselor.

Lehrer was considered a child prodigy and skipped two grades. After graduation from Loomis School, at the age of 15 he entered Harvard College, where one of his professors was Irving Kaplansky. As an undergraduate student at Harvard, he began to write comic songs to entertain his friends, including "Fight Fiercely, Harvard".

A fellow student and friend, (Note: Bernstein said that Lehrer's wit was evident even in his teens. "Lehrer and I sometimes had lunch together in the graduate dining room. On one occasion, a student waiter dropped a tray filled with silverware and dishes, with a resounding crash. 'They are playing our song,' Lehrer commented." Bernstein wrote in 2020, "From time to time, we email each other. We once reminisced about a math graduate student who was known for his obnoxiousness. He was so obnoxious that to find a practical unit of obnoxiousness, you had to use a millionth of his actual name.") the physicist Jeremy Bernstein, recalled that he was told to organize a luncheon entertainment for the seniors graduating in 1951. He knew only two entertainers, Lehrer and Al Capp, both of whom agreed. Lehrer ("and a small group of co-conspirators," Bernstein wrote) performed his songs as The Physical Revue for Harvard's physics department then and again in 1952. Bernstein said, "This performance had remarkable consequences for Lehrer. Capp had a weekly radio program, and Lehrer became a fixture. I think that this was the first time he had been let loose on the general public, although the program only lasted four weeks." The revue was revived by Lehrer in 1993 as Songs of the Physical Revue—a special performance for the American Physical Society to commemorate the centenary of their journal, the Physical Review.

== Academic and military career ==
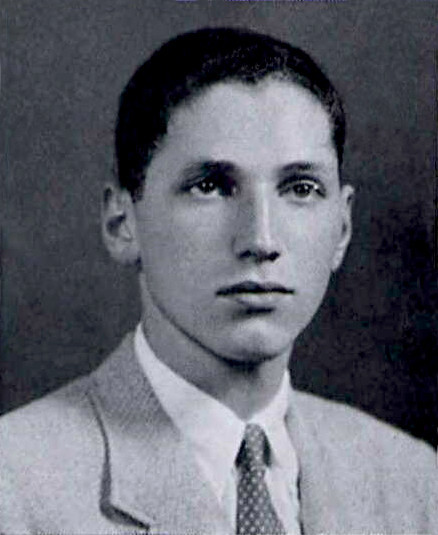
Lehrer in Harvard University's 1947–1948 yearbook

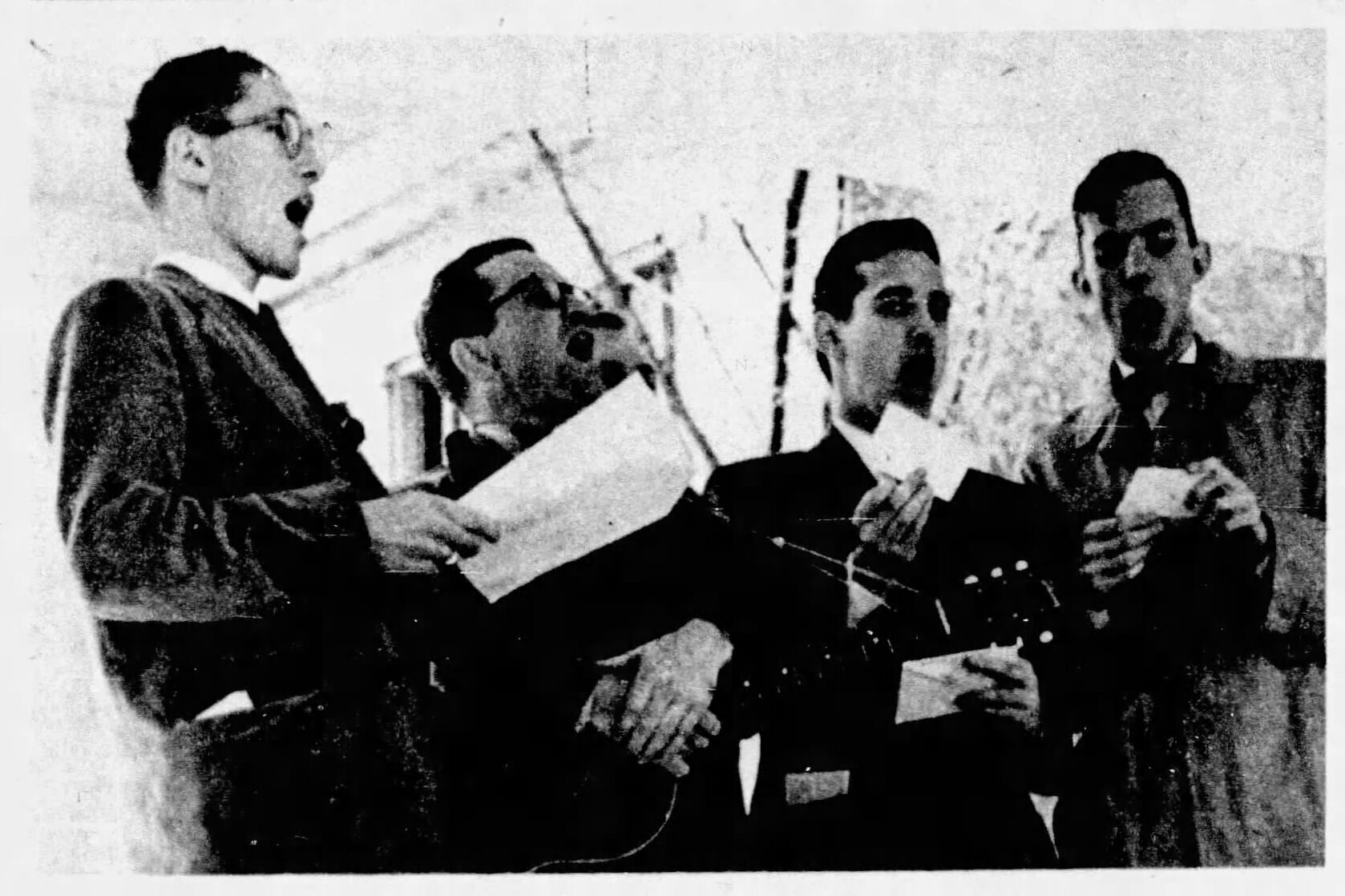
(From left) Lehrer, Robert H. Welker, David Z. Robinson, and Lewis M. Branscomb perform a hymn for the Harvard Spring rites on Arbor Day, 1951. The quartet performed songs for The Physical Revue.

Lehrer graduated from Harvard with a Bachelor of Arts in mathematics, magna cum laude, in 1946. At Harvard, he was the roommate of the Canadian theologian Robert Crouse. He received his MA degree the next year and was inducted into Phi Beta Kappa. He later taught mathematics and other classes at MIT, Harvard, Wellesley, and the University of California, Santa Cruz.

Lehrer remained in Harvard's doctoral program for several years, taking time also for his musical career. "I spent many, many years satisfying all the requirements, as many years as possible, and I started on the thesis," he once said. "But I just wanted to be a grad student, it's a wonderful life. That's what I wanted to be, and unfortunately, you can't be a Ph.D. and a grad student at the same time."

Lehrer reportedly worked briefly as a researcher with Stan Ulam at the Los Alamos Scientific Laboratory for two months in 1952.

In 1953, Lehrer left Harvard to work for Baird-Atomic, which made scientific and industrial instruments, including radiation detection and spectroscopy.

Lehrer was drafted into the U.S. Army in 1955. (Note: Bernstein wrote, "Lehrer was still a graduate student and had published at least one technical mathematics paper. But in 1955, he was drafted into the army for two years, part of which he spent at Los Alamos and most of which he spent at the National Security Agency in Washington. I never found out what he did at these places. He once told me that NSA stood for No Such Agency. My guess is that it was probably codebreaking. One of our Harvard math professors, Andrew Gleason, had spent the war cracking Japanese codes. It was after his military service that Lehrer's career as a touring performer took off.") He served until 1957, working at the National Security Agency (NSA). Lehrer once stated that he invented the Jello shot during this time, as a means of circumventing the base's ban on alcoholic beverages. Despite holding a master's degree in an era when American conscripts often lacked high school diplomas, Lehrer served as an enlisted soldier, achieving the rank of specialist third class, which he described as being a "corporal without portfolio". These experiences became fodder for songs, such as "The Wild West is Where I Want to Be" and "It Makes a Fellow Proud to Be a Soldier". In 2020 Lehrer publicly revealed that he had been assigned to the NSA; since the mere fact of the NSA's existence was classified at the time, Lehrer found himself in the position of implicitly using nuclear weapons work as a cover story for something more sensitive.

In 1960, Lehrer returned to full-time mathematics studies at Harvard. From 1962 he taught mathematics in the political science department at MIT in Cambridge, Massachusetts. In 1965 he gave up on his mathematics dissertation on modes in statistics, after working on it intermittently for 15 years.

Over time, Lehrer grew tired of shoveling snow in the harsh Cambridge winters; he already knew he liked California's Bay Area. He contacted botany professor Kenneth V. Thimann, provost of Crown College, University of California, Santa Cruz, and suggested teaching courses in musical theater. Since Crown was science-oriented, Thimann asked mathematician Anthony Joseph Tromba, who had been at Harvard and knew of Lehrer's musical antics, to find him a position at humanities-heavy Cowell College instead. Tromba sold Lehrer to the Fellowship Committee: "No one on the committee had heard of Tom. So I had to convince them that it was a great idea... We had Ph.D.s in music and art history who did scholarly work. But Cowell also wanted to have practicing artists to give students actual meaningful contact with them. Rather than just writing papers about Michelangelo, let's have Michelangelo here—and why not?" So in 1972, Lehrer joined the faculty of the University of California, Santa Cruz (UCSC). Tromba said that Lehrer was officially a "Lecturer in American Studies," not mathematics, though he taught two introductory classes, "The Nature of Mathematics" and "Mathematics in the Social Sciences," to liberal arts majors—"Math for Tenors", according to Lehrer. He occasionally performed songs in his lectures.

In 2001, Lehrer taught his last mathematics class, on the topic of infinity, and retired from academia. He remained in the area, maintaining homes in both Santa Cruz and Cambridge. In 2003 Lehrer confirmed he still "h[ung] out" around UCSC. Mike Peña of UCSC said in 2025, "Lehrer's reputation matched UC Santa Cruz's creative and irreverent spirit; and his talents played perfectly into the campus's original intent to elevate the humanities and foster deeper connections between scholarship and society... Lehrer taught at UC Santa Cruz until 2001 and last came here about five years ago. His cultural contributions are so woven into the American fabric that they ensure his place as one of the most beloved educators ever to teach at our campus."

== Musical career ==
=== Style and influences ===
When You Are Old and Gray
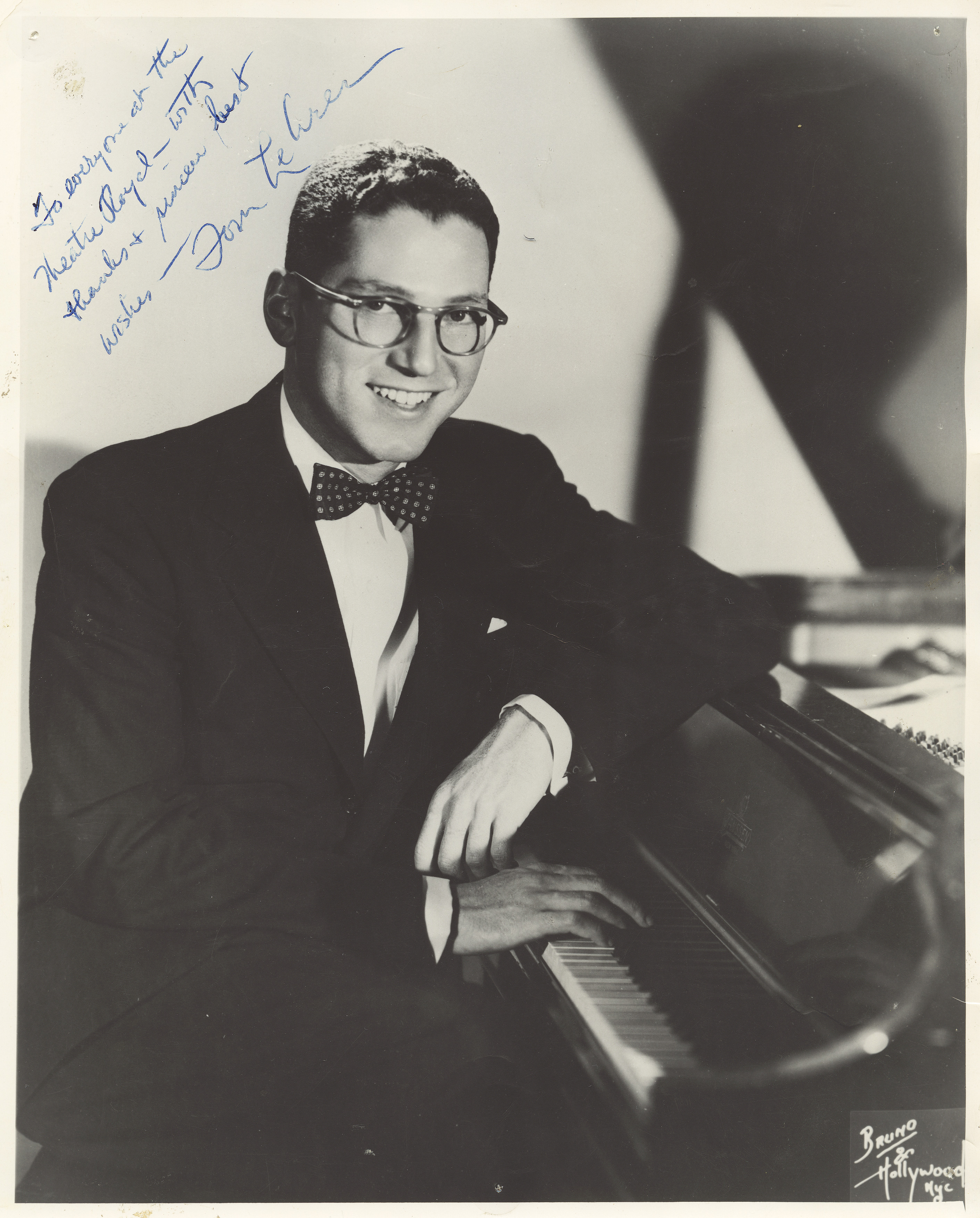
- Lehrer c. 1958
- When You Are Old and Gray "When You Are Old and Gray", a satirical song about love. Studio recording from Songs by Tom Lehrer (1953).

Lehrer was mainly influenced by musical theater. According to Gerald Nachman's book Seriously Funny, the Broadway musical Let's Face It! made an early and lasting impression on him. Lehrer's style consists of parodying various forms of popular song. For example, his appreciation of list songs led him to write "The Elements", which lists the chemical elements to the tune of Gilbert and Sullivan's "Major-General's Song" from The Pirates of Penzance.

He gave his first public concert as a third-year graduate student, at the Sanders Theatre in 1950.

— Jeremy Bernstein

In author and Boston University professor Isaac Asimov's second autobiographical volume, In Joy Still Felt, Asimov recounted seeing Lehrer perform in a Boston nightclub on October 9, 1954. Lehrer sang a song about Jim getting it from Louise, and Sally from Jim, "... and after a while you gathered the 'it' was venereal disease. Suddenly, as the combinations grew more grotesque, you realized he was satirizing every known perversion without using a single naughty phrase. It was clearly unsingable outside a nightclub." Asimov also recalled a song that dealt with the Boston subway system, making use of the stations leading into town from Harvard, observing that the local subject-matter rendered the song useless for general distribution. Lehrer subsequently granted Asimov permission to print the lyrics to "The Subway Song" in his book. "I haven't gone to nightclubs often," said Asimov, "but of all the times I have gone, it was on this occasion that I had by far the best time."

=== Recordings ===
We Will All Go Together When We Go
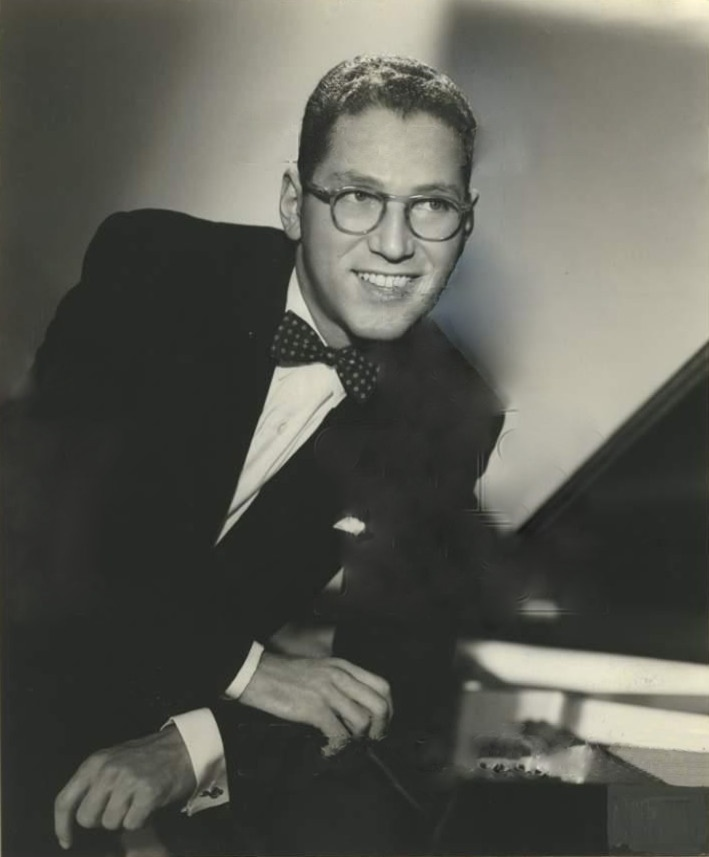
- Lehrer c. 1958
- We Will All Go Together When We Go "We Will All Go Together When We Go", a song about nuclear holocaust leading to human extinction. Studio recording from More of Tom Lehrer (1959).

Lehrer was encouraged by the success of his performances, so he paid $15 (equivalent to $181 in 2025) to record in a single one-hour session on January 22, 1953, at the TransRadio studio on Boylston Street in Boston, Songs by Tom Lehrer. The initial pressing was 400 copies. Radio stations would not air his songs because of his controversial subjects, so he sold the album on campus at Harvard for $3, equivalent to $36 in 2025, while "several stores near the Harvard campus sold it for $3.50, taking only a minimal markup as a kind of community service. Newsstands on campus sold it for the same price." After one summer, he started to receive mail orders from all parts of the country, as far away as San Francisco, after the San Francisco Chronicle wrote an article on the record. Interest in his recordings spread by word of mouth. People played their records for friends, who then also wanted a copy. Lehrer recalled, "Lacking exposure in the media, my songs spread slowly. Like herpes, rather than ebola."

The album included the macabre "I Hold Your Hand in Mine", the mildly risqué "Be Prepared", and "Lobachevsky", regarding plagiarizing mathematicians. It became a cult success by word of mouth, despite being self-published and without promotion. The limited distribution of the album led to a knock-off album by Jack "Eljan" (a pseudonym of Jack Nagel) being released in 1958 without Lehrer's approval, where some of the lyrics were mistranscribed.

Lehrer embarked on a series of concert tours and recorded a second album in 1959. He released the second album in two versions: the songs were the same, but More of Tom Lehrer was a studio recording and An Evening Wasted with Tom Lehrer was recorded live in concert. In 2013, Lehrer recalled the studio session for "Poisoning Pigeons in the Park", which referred to the practice of controlling pigeons in Boston with strychnine-treated corn:

The copyist arrived at the last minute with the parts and passed them out to the band ... And there was no title on it, and there was no lyrics. And so they ran through it, "What a pleasant little waltz" ... And the engineer said, "'Poisoning Pigeons in the Park,' take one," and the piano player said, "What?" and literally fell off the stool.

=== Touring ===
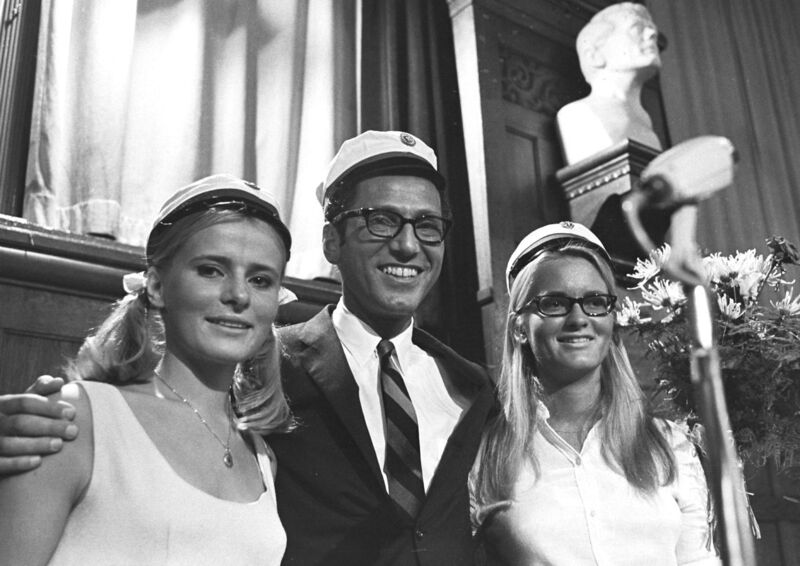
Lehrer as an honorary member of the Copenhagen Student Union, 1967

Lehrer had a breakthrough in the United Kingdom on December 4, 1957, when the University of London awarded a doctor of music degree honoris causa to Princess Margaret, and the public orator, Professor J. R. Sutherland, said it was "in the full knowledge that the Princess is a connoisseur of music and a performer of skill and distinction, her taste being catholic, ranging from Mozart to the calypso and from opera to the songs of Miss Beatrice Lillie and Tom Lehrer." This prompted significant interest in Lehrer's works and helped to secure distribution in Britain for his five-year-old debut album. It was there that his music achieved real sales popularity, as a result of the proliferation of university newspapers referring to the material, and inadvertently due to the BBC, which in 1958 banned from broadcast 10 of the 12 songs on the album. By the end of the 1950s, Lehrer had sold 370,000 records.

=== That Was The Week That Was ===
In 1960, Lehrer essentially retired from touring in the U.S. That same year, however, he toured Australia and New Zealand, performing a total of 33 concerts to great acclaim and controversy. While in New Zealand, he penned lyrics critical of the All Blacks' upcoming tour of Apartheid-era South Africa and Prime Minister Walter Nash's stance on it. Lehrer's tours occurred during a time in which he was, he said, "banned, censored, mentioned in several houses of parliament and threatened with arrest." In particular, "Be Prepared" drew advance resistance in Brisbane from the commissioner of police. He performed several songs in Australia that were still unreleased, including "The Masochism Tango".

In the early 1960s, Lehrer was employed as the resident songwriter for the U.S. edition of That Was The Week That Was (TW3), a satirical television show. A greater proportion of his output became overtly political, or at least topical, on subjects such as education ("New Math"), the Second Vatican Council ("The Vatican Rag"), race relations ("National Brotherhood Week"), air and water pollution ("Pollution"), American militarism ("Send the Marines"), and nuclear proliferation ("Who's Next?" and "MLF Lullaby"). He also wrote a song satirizing rocket scientist Wernher von Braun, who worked for Nazi Germany before working for the United States. Lehrer did not appear on TW3; vocalist Nancy Ames performed his songs (to Lehrer's chagrin), and lines were often cut from his songs. Lehrer later performed nine of these songs at the Hungry I nightclub in San Francisco, and this became the album That Was the Year That Was (1965).

National Brotherhood Week
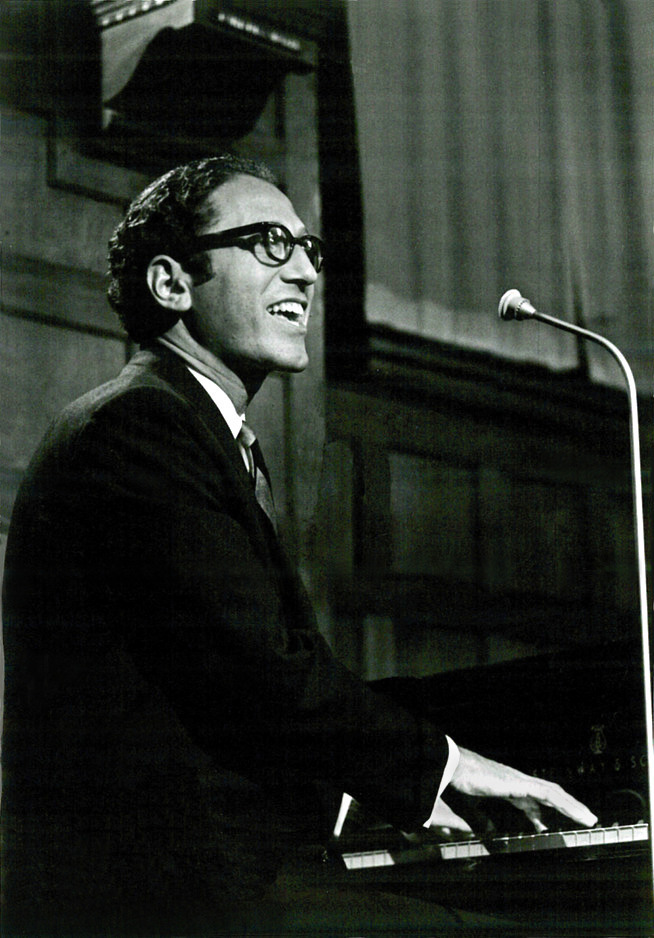
- Lehrer performing in Copenhagen, 1967
- National Brotherhood Week "National Brotherhood Week", a song about an annual event promoted by the National Conference for Community and Justice. Live recording from That Was the Year That Was (1965).

In 1966, BBC TV host David Frost returned to the UK with the BBC program The Frost Report; alongside Julie Felix, Lehrer provided musical satire on the weekly subject. The show was transmitted live, and he pre-recorded all his segments at one performance. Lehrer was not featured in every edition, but his songs featured in an appropriate part of each show. At least two of these songs were not included on any of his LPs: a reworking of Noël Coward's "That is the End of the News" (with some new lyrics) and a comic explanation of how Britain might adapt to the coming of decimal currency.

Lehrer's record deal with Reprise Records for That Was The Year That Was also gave Reprise distribution rights for his earlier recordings, because Lehrer wanted to wind up his own record imprint. The Reprise issue of Songs by Tom Lehrer was a stereo re-recording. This version was not issued on CD, as Lehrer was unhappy with this version. The live recording included bonus tracks "L-Y" and "Silent E", two of the ten songs that he wrote for the PBS children's educational series The Electric Company. Lehrer later commented that worldwide sales of the recordings under Reprise surpassed 1.8 million units in 1996. That same year, That Was The Year That Was went gold. The album liner notes promote his songs with self-deprecating humor, such as quoting a New York Times review from 1959: Mr. Lehrer's muse is "not fettered by such inhibiting factors as taste".

Lehrer toured Sweden, Norway, and Denmark in 1967; his concert in Oslo was recorded for Danish television and subsequently released on DVD some 40 years later. He performed as a prominent international guest at the Studenterforeningen (student association) in Copenhagen, which was televised, and he commented on stage that he might be America's "revenge for Victor Borge". He performed original songs in a Dodge automobile industrial film distributed primarily to automobile dealers and shown at promotional events in 1967, set in a fictional American wild west town and titled The Dodge Rebellion Theatre presents Ballads For '67. He attempted to adapt Sweeney Todd as a Broadway musical, working with Joe Raposo, to star Jerry Colonna. They started a few songs but, as Lehrer noted, "Nothing ever came of it, and of course twenty years later Stephen Sondheim beat me to the punch."

=== Departure from the music scene ===
L-Y
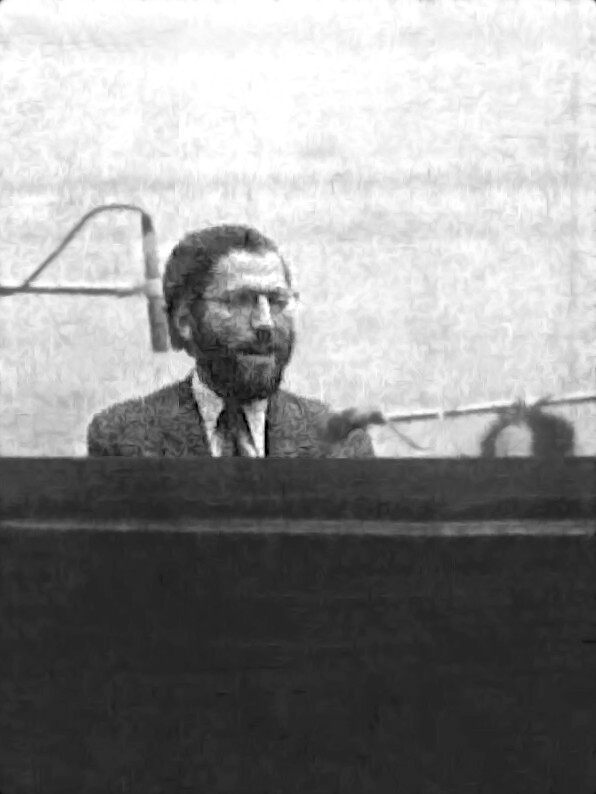
- Lehrer performing at a fundraising event for George McGovern in Brattleboro, Vermont, 1972
- L-Y "L-Y", a song featured in The Electric Company.

Although Lehrer was "a hero of the anti-nuclear, civil rights left", he disliked the aesthetics of the counterculture of the 1960s and largely stopped performing in the United States as the movement gained momentum.

In the 1970s, Lehrer concentrated on teaching mathematics and musical theater, although he also wrote ten songs for the educational children's television show The Electric Company. His last public performance for many years took place in 1972, on a fundraising tour for the anti-Vietnam War Democratic U.S. presidential candidate George McGovern.

When asked why he had abandoned his musical career in an interview for the booklet accompanying his CD boxed set, The Remains of Tom Lehrer (2000), Lehrer replied: "If an idea came to me, I'd write, and if it didn't I wouldn't—and, gradually, the second option prevailed over the first. Occasionally people ask 'If you enjoyed it'—and I did—'why don't you do it again?' I reply, 'I enjoyed high school but I certainly wouldn't want to do that again.'"

Yet at different times he gave other explanations for quitting. In 1973, he had said that "political satire became obsolete when Henry Kissinger was awarded the Nobel Peace Prize." He later stated, in an interview with The A.V. Club in 2000, that this was only an off-hand remark and was not the actual reason for him quitting. In 1981, at a New York performance of Tomfoolery, he told The New York Times, "The Vietnam War is what changed it. Everybody got earnest. My purpose was to make people laugh and not applaud. If the audience applauds they’re just showing they agree with me. But that’s not humor. So I dropped out just in time."

Lehrer's musical career was relatively brief. He once mentioned that he performed a mere 109 shows and wrote 37 songs over 20 years. Nevertheless, he developed a cult following in subsequent decades.

=== Revivals and reissues ===
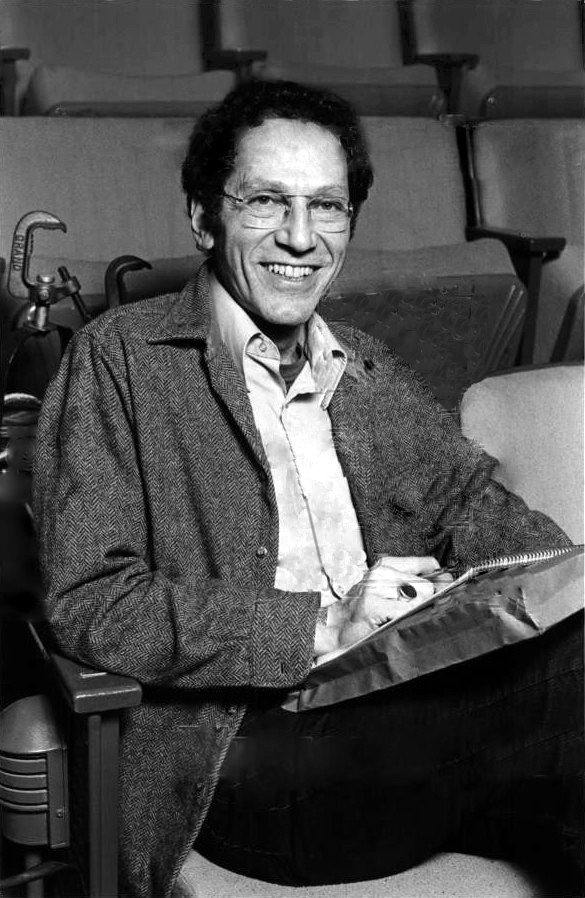
Lehrer c. 1983

Lehrer's music became a staple of The Doctor Demento Show when it began national syndication in 1977. In 1980, Cameron Mackintosh produced Tomfoolery, a revue of Lehrer's songs that was a hit on the London stage. Lehrer was not initially involved with the show, but he was pleased with it; he eventually gave the stage production his full support and updated several of his lyrics for the show. Tomfoolery contained 27 songs and led to more than 200 productions, including an Off-Broadway production at the Village Gate which ran for 120 performances in 1981. Lehrer made a rare TV appearance on BBC's Parkinson show in conjunction with the Tomfoolery premiere in 1980 at the Criterion Theatre in London, where he sang "I Got It from Agnes". There were Tomfoolery performances in San Francisco about 1982 and in 2018–19. Tomfoolery was performed at the Arena Stage Theater in Washington, DC, in 1982. In 1993, he wrote "That's Mathematics" for the closing credits to a Mathematical Sciences Research Institute video celebrating the proof of Fermat's Last Theorem.

On June 7 and 8, 1998, Lehrer performed in public for the first time in 18 years at the Lyceum Theatre, London, as part of the show Hey, Mr. Producer! celebrating the career of Cameron Mackintosh, who had produced Tomfoolery. The June 8 show was his only performance before Queen Elizabeth II. Lehrer sang "Poisoning Pigeons in the Park" and an updated version of the nuclear proliferation song "Who's Next?".

In 2000, Lehrer commented that he doubted his songs had any real effect on those not already critical of the establishment: "I don't think this kind of thing has an impact on the unconverted, frankly. It's not even preaching to the converted; it's titillating the converted ... I'm fond of quoting Peter Cook, who talked about the satirical Berlin Kabaretts of the 1930s, which did so much to stop the rise of Hitler and prevent the Second World War."

Lehrer said, jokingly, of his musical career: "If, after hearing my songs, just one human being is inspired to say something nasty to a friend, or perhaps to strike a loved one, it will all have been worth the while." In 2003, Lehrer commented that his particular brand of political satire is more difficult in the modern world: "The real issues I don't think most people touch. The Clinton jokes are all about Monica Lewinsky and all that stuff and not about the important things, like the fact that he wouldn't ban land mines ... I'm not tempted to write a song about George W. Bush. I couldn't figure out what sort of song I would write. That's the problem: I don't want to satirize George Bush and his puppeteers, I want to vaporize them."

In 2000, the boxed CD set The Remains of Tom Lehrer was released by Rhino Entertainment. It included live and studio versions of his first two albums, That Was The Year That Was, the songs that he wrote for The Electric Company, some previously unreleased material, and a small hardbound lyrics book with an introduction by Dr. Demento. In 2010, Shout! Factory launched a reissue campaign, making Lehrer's out-of-print albums available digitally. The CD/DVD combo The Tom Lehrer Collection was issued, including his best-known songs, with a DVD featuring an Oslo concert.

== Later life and death ==
In a February 2008 phone call, Gene Weingarten of The Washington Post interviewed Lehrer off the record. When Weingarten asked if there was anything he could print for the record, Lehrer responded, "Just tell the people that I am voting for Obama."

In 2012, rapper 2 Chainz sampled Lehrer's song "The Old Dope Peddler" on his debut album, Based on a T.R.U. Story. In 2013, Lehrer said he was "very proud" to have his song sampled "literally sixty years after I recorded it". Lehrer went on to describe his official response to the request to use his song: "As sole copyright owner of 'The Old Dope Peddler', I grant you motherfuckers permission to do this. Please give my regards to Mr. Chainz, or may I call him 2?"

In October 2020, Lehrer transferred the music and lyrics for all songs he had ever written into the public domain:

In short, I no longer retain any rights to any of my songs. So help yourselves, and don’t send me any money.

— Tom Lehrer

In November 2022, Lehrer formally relinquished the copyright and performing/recording rights on his songs, making all music and lyrics composed by him free for anyone to use, and established a website from which all of his recordings and printable copies of all of his songs could be downloaded. His statement releasing all his works into the public domain concludes with this note: "This website will be shut down at some date in the not too distant future, so if you want to download anything, don't wait too long." As of June 2026, the website is still online.

Comedy label Stand Up! Records released Lehrer's holiday songs "(I'm Spending) Hanukkah in Santa Monica," which he had written for Garrison Keillor's The American Radio Company of the Air in 1990 and recorded later, (Note: David Bianculli writes, "The idea was to provide a Jewish counterpart to such Christmas classics as "White Christmas," and quotes a section: "But in December, there's just one place for me. Amid the California flora, I'll be lighting my menorah. Like a baby in his cradle, I'll be playing with my dreidel. Here's to Judas Maccabeus: Boy, if he could only see us spending Hanukkah in Santa Monica by the sea.") and "A Christmas Carol" as a seven-inch single in 2024. The limited-edition release also included sheet music for both songs.

Lehrer never married and had no children. He died at his home in Cambridge, Massachusetts, on July 26, 2025, at the age of 97.

== Musical legacy ==
In 1967, Swedish actor Lars Ekborg, known outside Sweden for his part in Ingmar Bergman's Summer with Monika, made an album called I Tom Lehrers vackra värld ("In the beautiful world of Tom Lehrer"), with 12 of Lehrer's songs translated into Swedish. Lehrer wrote in a letter to the producer Per-Anders Boquist that, "Not knowing any Swedish, I am obviously not equipped to judge, but it sounds to me as though Mr. Ekborg is perfect for the songs", along with further compliments to pianist Leif Asp for unexpected additional flourishes.

In 1971, Argentinian singer Nacha Guevara sang Spanish versions of several Lehrer songs for the show/live album Este es el año que es. In the 1950s, Georg Kreisler wrote two songs likely inspired by Tom Lehrer's "Poisoning Pigeons in the Park" and "I Hold Your Hand in Mine", as mentioned by Lehrer himself even though disputed by Kreisler. Composer Randy Newman said of Lehrer, "He's one of the great American songwriters without a doubt, right up there with everybody, the top guys. As a lyricist, as good as there's been in the last half of the 20th century." Singer and comedian Dillie Keane has acknowledged Lehrer's influence on her work.

Dr. Demento praised Lehrer as "the best musical satirist of the twentieth century." Other artists who cite Lehrer as an influence include "Weird Al" Yankovic, whose work generally addresses more popular and less technical or political subjects, and educator and scientist H. Paul Shuch, who tours under the stage name Dr. SETI, and calls himself "a cross between Carl Sagan and Tom Lehrer: He sings like Sagan and lectures like Lehrer." Yankovic saw Daniel Radcliffe (who called Lehrer his "hero") perform "The Elements" on The Graham Norton Show in his native United Kingdom, which led to Radcliffe starring in Weird: The Al Yankovic Story.

From January 16 to February 25, 2006, the play Letters from Lehrer, written and performed by Canadian Richard Greenblatt, ran at CanStage in Toronto. It followed Lehrer's musical career, the meaning of several songs, the politics of the time, and Greenblatt's own experiences with Lehrer's music, while playing some of Lehrer's songs.

In the March 16, 2006, issue of New York magazine, Donald Fagen of Steely Dan named Tom Lehrer among the writers who had influenced him and his songwriting partner Walter Becker. "We also liked comic songwriting, like Tom Lehrer. He was a piano player and songwriter who wrote these grim, funny songs."

In 2010, the German musician-comedian Felix Janosa released an album with the title Tauben vergiften: Die bösen Lieder von Tom Lehrer ("Poisoning pigeons: The Evil Songs of Tom Lehrer"), with German versions of some of his best-known songs.

In 2024, Francis Beckett wrote a play Tom Lehrer Is Teaching Math and Doesn't Want to Talk to You, which features Lehrer's music and was performed with Lehrer's tacit approval at the Upstairs at The Gatehouse theatre in Highgate, London.

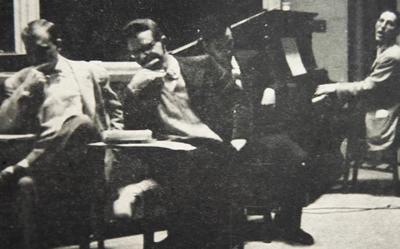
Lehrer at the piano during The Physical Revue, c. 1952

In 2025, The Harvard Crimson recalls how Lehrer expressed his surprise that "well, I wrote 'Fight Fiercely, Harvard' in 1945" and it was still being performed in the 21st century. The Crimson comments, "[As] Harvard squares off with the Trump administration, the song—which genteelly urges football players to 'hurl that spheroid down the field'—has become a protest anthem of sorts, too."

Performers influenced by Lehrer's style include American political satirist Mark Russell, Canadian comedian and songwriter Randy Vancourt, and the British duo Kit and The Widow. Composer/cabarettist Leonard Lehrman extended three of Lehrer's songs, writing a new verse 4 to "Clementine", a new verse 2 to "Hanukkah in Santa Monica", and a new verse 3 to "The Elements".

Lehrer has been referred to as the "King of Satire" by fans.

== Discography ==
Studio albums

- Songs by Tom Lehrer (1953), re-recorded in 1966 OCLC 1406915353
- More of Tom Lehrer (1959) OCLC 254651087

Live albums

- An Evening Wasted with Tom Lehrer (1959) OCLC 1454955440
- Revisited (1960) OCLC 48452419
- Tom Lehrer Discovers Australia (And Vice Versa) (1960; Australia-only)
- That Was the Year That Was (1965) OCLC 246160338

Compilation albums

- Tom Lehrer in Concert (1994; UK compilation) OCLC 874933424
- Songs & More Songs by Tom Lehrer (1997; US compilation of his first two studio albums with additional songs) OCLC 37188082
- The Remains of Tom Lehrer (2000) OCLC 612865755
- The Tom Lehrer Collection (2010) OCLC 567292051
- The Conducted Tom Lehrer (2023; Adds instrumental versions of four songs, with an additional song, 'Trees', that was previously unreleased)

Singles

- "That's Mathematics"/"I Got It From Agnes" (Needlejuice Records, 2023)
- "(I’m Spending) Hanukkah in Santa Monica"/"A Christmas Carol" (Stand Up! Records, 2024)

Covers

Many of Lehrer's songs are performed by others in That Was The Week That Was (Radiola LP, 1981).

== Publications ==
Mathematics

- Fagen, R. E; Lehrer, T. A. (January 24, 1957). "The Gambler's Ruin with Soft-Hearted Adversary (Random Walks with Restraining Barrier and Absorbing Barrier)" (PDF). National Security Agency.

See: gambler's ruin. Contains a reference to a fictional mathematical paper, quoted from the lyrics to his song Lobachevsky: Analytic and Algebraic Topology of Locally Euclidean Metrizations of Infinitely Differentiable Riemannian Manifolds. The NSA paper was later edited and published by American Mathematical Society in March 1958, complete with fictional reference.

The American Mathematical Society database lists him as co-author of two papers:

- Fagen, R. E; Lehrer, T. A. (March 1958). "Random Walks with Restraining Barrier as Applied to the Biased Binary Counter". Journal of the Society for Industrial and Applied Mathematics. 6 (1): 1–14. doi:10.1137/0106001. JSTOR 2098858. MR 0094856.
- T. Austin; R. Fagen; T. Lehrer; W. Penney (September 1957). "The Distribution of the Number of Locally Maximal Elements in a Random Sample". Annals of Mathematical Statistics. 28 (3): 786–790. doi:10.1214/aoms/1177706893. MR 0091251.

Songs

Two of Lehrer's songs were reprinted, with his permission, in Mad magazine:

- "Tom Lehrer Sings 'The Wild West Is Where I Want to Be'" (illustrated by George Woodbridge, MAD 32, April 1957)
- "Tom Lehrer's 'The Hunting Song'" (illustrated by George Woodbridge, MAD 35, October 1957)

Sheet music

- The Tom Lehrer Song Book (Crown Publishers Inc., 1954; Library of Congress Card Catalog Number 54-12068)
- Tom Lehrer's Second Song Book. Crown Publishers. 1968.
- Too Many Songs by Tom Lehrer: With Not Enough Drawings by Ronald Searle (Pantheon, 1981, ISBN 0-394-74930-8; Methuen, 1999, ISBN 978-0-413-74230-8).
