= Lobachevsky (song) =

1951 song by Tom Lehrer

Lobachevsky
Lehrer sings "Lobachevsky"

"Lobachevsky" is a humorous song by Tom Lehrer, referring to the mathematician Nikolai Ivanovich Lobachevsky. According to Lehrer, the song is "not intended as a slur on [Lobachevsky's] character" and the name was chosen "solely for prosodic reasons".

In the introduction, Lehrer describes the song as an adaptation of a routine that Danny Kaye did to honor the Russian actor Constantin Stanislavski. (The Danny Kaye routine is sung from the perspective of a famous Russian actor who learns and applies Stanislavski's secret to method acting: "Suffer.") Lehrer sings the song from the point of view of an eminent Russian mathematician who learns from Lobachevsky that plagiarism is the secret of success in mathematics ("only be sure always to call it please 'research'"). The narrator later uses this strategy to get a paper published ahead of a rival, then to write a book and earn a fortune selling the movie rights.

Lehrer wrote that he did not know Russian. In the song he quotes two "book reviews" in Russian; the first is a long sentence that he then translates succinctly as "It stinks." The second, a different but equally long sentence, is also translated as "It stinks." The actual text of these sentences bear no relation to academics: the first phrase quotes Mussorgsky's "Song of the Flea": Russian: Жил-был король когда-то, при нём блоха жила, romanized: Zhil-byl korol' kogda-to, pri nom blokha zhila, lit. 'Once there was a king who had a pet flea'. The second references a Russian joke: Russian: Я иду туда, куда сам царь идёт пешком, romanized: Ya idu tuda, kuda sam tsar' idot peshkom, lit. 'Now I must go where even the Tsar goes on foot' [the bathroom].

At 115 seconds in, the song briefly quotes Hungarian Rhapsody No. 2 by Franz Liszt.

The song was first performed as part of The Physical Revue, a 1951–1952 musical revue by Lehrer and a few other professors. It is track 6 on Songs by Tom Lehrer, which was re-released as part of Songs & More Songs by Tom Lehrer and The Remains of Tom Lehrer. In this early version, Ingrid Bergman is named to star in the role of "the Hypotenuse" in The Eternal Triangle, a film purportedly based on the narrator's book. It was recorded again for Revisited (Tom Lehrer album), with Brigitte Bardot as the Hypotenuse. A third recording is included in Tom Lehrer Discovers Australia (And Vice Versa), a live album recorded in Australia, featuring Marilyn Monroe as the Hypotenuse. A fourth recording was made in 1966 when Songs by Tom Lehrer was reissued in stereo, with Doris Day playing the Hypotenuse.

In 1957, while working for the National Security Agency, Lehrer coauthored a paper in which he snuck in the song's line "Analytic and Algebraic Topology of Locally Euclidean Metrizations of Infinitely Differentiable Riemannian Manifolds" into the reference section as an uncited and unpublished paper by Lobachevsky.

The song is frequently quoted, especially in works about plagiarism. Writing about it in Billboard, Jim Bessman calls the song "dazzlingly inventive in its shameless promotion of plagiarism", calling out in particular a sequence in which Lehrer strings together rhymes from the names of ten Russian [sic] cities. Mathematician Jordan Ellenberg has called it "surely the greatest comic musical number of all time about mathematical publishing".
