= Major-General's Song =

Gilbert & Sullivan song

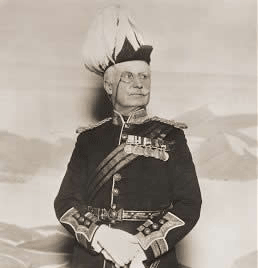
Henry Lytton as the Major-General (1919)

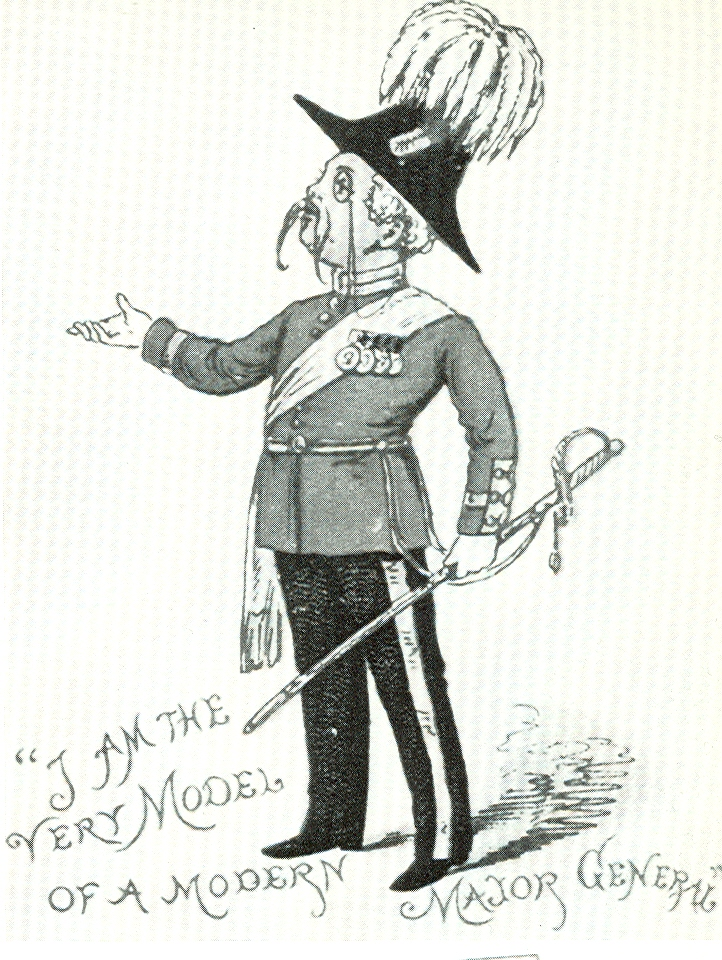
Drawing from 1884 children's Pirates

"I Am the Very Model of a Modern Major-General" (often referred to as the "Major-General's Song" or "Modern Major-General's Song") is a patter song from Gilbert and Sullivan's 1879 comic opera The Pirates of Penzance. It has been called the most famous Gilbert and Sullivan patter song. Sung by Major-General Stanley at his first entrance, towards the end of Act I, the character introduces himself by presenting his résumé as a polymath but admitting to fundamental shortcomings. He claims a wide range of classical, historical and scientific knowledge but admits that he knows little of military tactics, weapons or jargon. The song thereby satirises the idea of the "modern" educated British Army officer of the latter 19th century.

The song is replete with historical and cultural references, in which the Major-General describes his impressive and well-rounded education in non-military matters, but he says that his military knowledge has "only been brought down to the beginning of the century". The stage directions in the libretto state that near the end of each verse the Major-General is "bothered for a rhyme"; interpolated business occurs here, and in each case he finds a rhyme and finishes the verse with a flourish.

The piece is difficult to perform because of the fast pace and tongue-twisting nature of the lyrics.

== Historical basis ==
The character of Major-General Stanley was widely taken to be a caricature of the popular general Sir Garnet Wolseley. The biographer Michael Ainger, however, doubts that Gilbert intended a caricature of Wolseley, identifying instead the older General Henry Turner, an uncle of Gilbert's wife whom Gilbert disliked, as a more likely inspiration for the satire. Nevertheless, in the original London production, George Grossmith imitated Wolseley's mannerisms and appearance, particularly his large moustache, and the audience recognised the allusion. Wolseley himself, according to his biographer, took no offence at the identification and sometimes sang "I am the very model of a modern Major-General" for the private amusement of his family and friends.

== Lyrics ==
Major-General's Song
George Baker sings the "I am the very model of a modern Major-General", conducted by George W. Byng (1920)

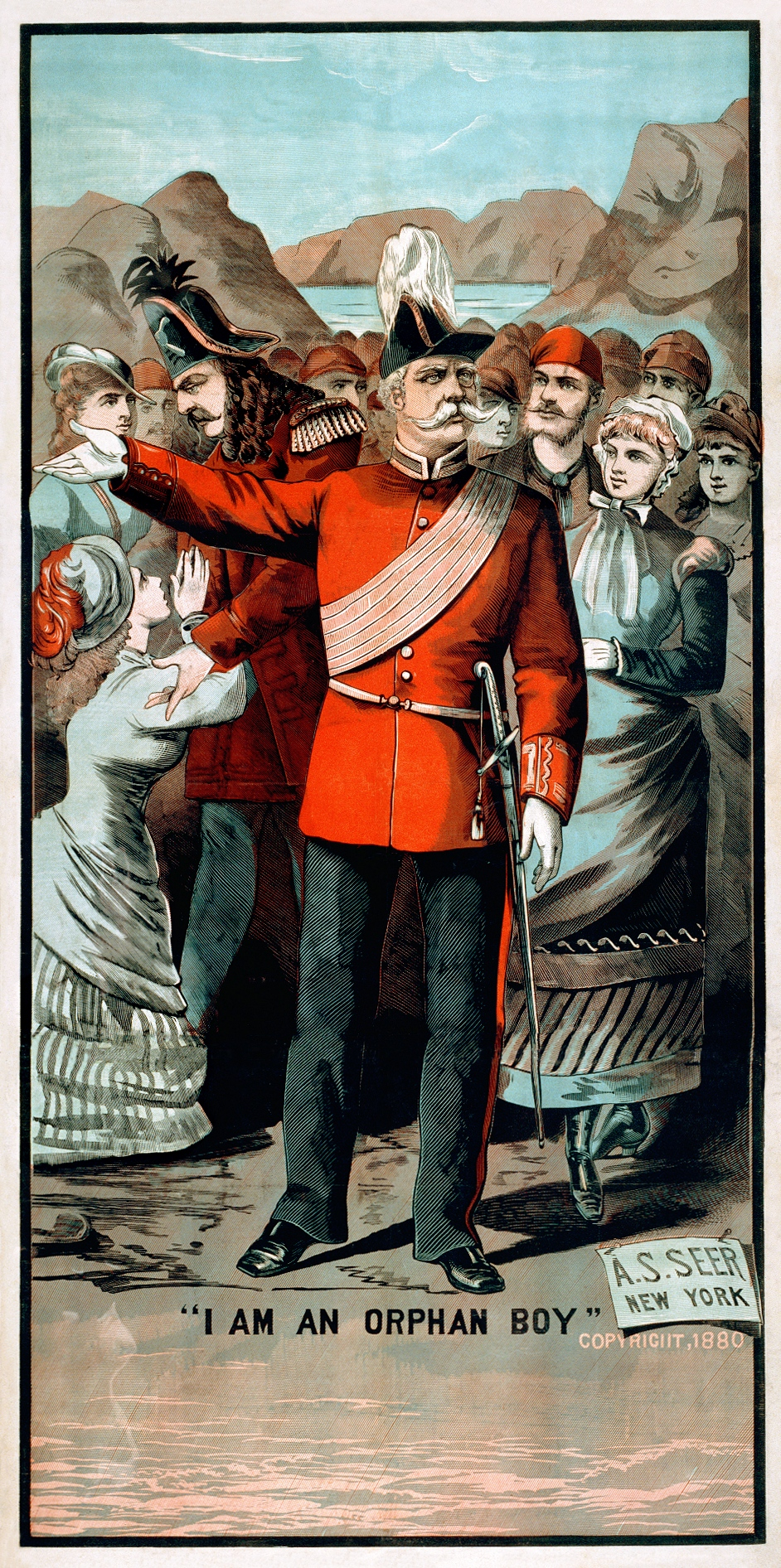
1880 poster

I am the very model of a modern Major-Gineral, (Note: Gilbert wrote "Gineral", which rhymes with mineral.)
I've information vegetable, animal, and mineral,
I know the kings of England, and I quote the fights historical
From Marathon to Waterloo, in order categorical; (Note: This is a reference to The Fifteen Decisive Battles of the World by Sir Edward Shepherd Creasy (1851). This classic military history describes the great battles of the world, from "Marathon to Waterloo". When the Major-General says that he can name these "in order categorical", he is saying that he will organise the information not merely in a simple order, such as chronological order, but by category – sea battles vs. land battles, etc.)
I'm very well acquainted, too, with matters mathematical,
I understand equations, both the simple and quadratical,
About binomial theorem I'm teeming with a lot o' news,
With many cheerful facts about the square of the hypotenuse.

I'm very good at integral and differential calculus;
I know the scientific names of beings animalculous:
In short, in matters vegetable, animal, and mineral,
I am the very model of a modern Major-Gineral.

I know our mythic history, King Arthur's and Sir Caradoc's;
I answer hard acrostics, I've a pretty taste for paradox,
I quote in elegiacs all the crimes of Heliogabalus,
In conics I can floor peculiarities parabolous;
I can tell undoubted Raphaels from Gerard Dows and Zoffanies, (Note: Raphael, Dow, and Zoffany lived in three different centuries and painted in different styles; distinguishing their works would not be difficult.)
I know the croaking chorus from The Frogs of Aristophanes!
Then I can hum a fugue of which I've heard the music's din afore, (Note: The Major-General claims to be able to hum a fugue, but because a fugue contains more than one musical line playing simultaneously in counterpoint, humming all the parts of a fugue simultaneously is impossible.)
And whistle all the airs from that infernal nonsense Pinafore.

Then I can write a washing bill in Babylonic cuneiform,
And tell you ev'ry detail of Caractacus's uniform: (Note: In John Henry Foley's 1859 sculpture, Caractacus is only wearing a loincloth, and so knowing the details of his "uniform" is not a great achievement.)
In short, in matters vegetable, animal, and mineral,
I am the very model of a modern Major-Gineral.

In fact, when I know what is meant by "mamelon" and "ravelin",
When I can tell at sight a Mauser rifle from a javelin, (Note: In early versions of the libretto, "Mauser rifle" in line 26 is "Chassepot rifle". The Chassepot was an early breech loading rifle used by the French, but it had gone out of production by 1875. The Mauser rifle, adopted by the German army in 1871, became the more widely used rifle, and Gilbert changed the lyric after the 1907 revival of Pirates.)
When such affairs as sorties and surprises I'm more wary at,
And when I know precisely what is meant by "commissariat",
When I have learnt what progress has been made in modern gunnery,
When I know more of tactics than a novice in a nunnery –
In short, when I've a smattering of elemental strategy –
You'll say a better Major-General has never sat a gee. (Note: The phrase "sat a gee" means "sat on a horse".)

For my military knowledge, though I'm plucky and adventury,
Has only been brought down to the beginning of the century;
But still, in matters vegetable, animal, and mineral,
I am the very model of a modern Major-Gineral.

== In popular culture ==
=== Film references ===
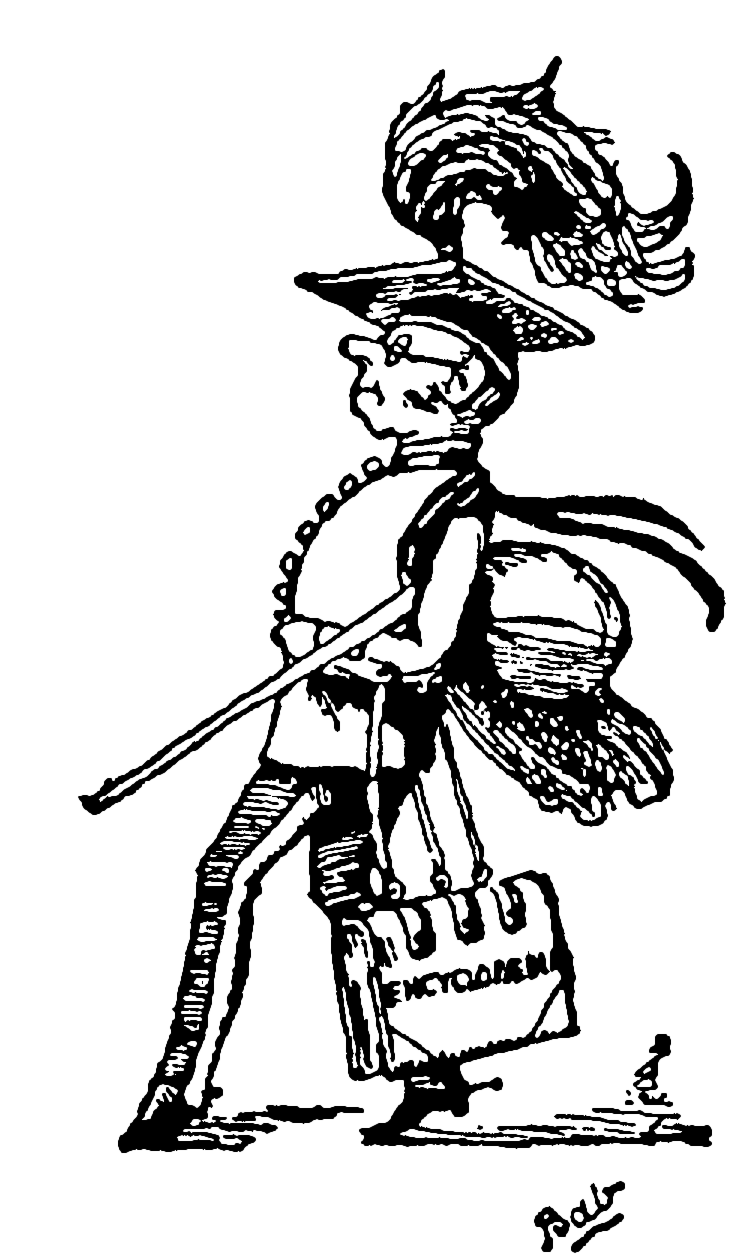
The Major-General carries an encyclopedia in this "Bab" drawing by W. S. Gilbert.

The Pirate Movie, a 1982 modern musical parody of The Pirates of Penzance, features many songs from the opera, including this song with contemporary references interpolated. In the 1983 film Never Cry Wolf, the hero sings the song. Similarly, in the 2001 time-travel comedy Kate & Leopold, Leopold sings the song; however, the scene is anachronistic in that The Pirates of Penzance premiered in 1879, after Leopold had already left his own time of 1876. The lead characters of the 2015 film Those People sing along to the song in duelling fashion. A nonsense pastiche of the song in the 2017 film Despicable Me 3, sung by Minions, was termed "amusing" and "the film’s finest moment"; it was uploaded to YouTube by Illumination Entertainment as a singalong challenge, which has garnered more than 19 million views as of 2025.

=== Television references ===
The song, or parts of it, has been sung in numerous television programs. For example, The Muppet Show (season 3, episode 52) staged a duet of the song with guest host Gilda Radner and a 7-foot-tall (2.1 m) talking carrot. Radner had requested a seven-foot-tall talking parrot, but Kermit had difficulty reading her handwriting. In a short cutaway from the 2012 Family Guy episode "Killer Queen", Peter plays the Major-General in a community theater production and mumbles all through the opening verse of the song. The 2003 VeggieTales cartoon episode The Wonderful World of Auto-Tainment! features Archibald Asparagus singing the first verse of the song. In Season 2, Episode 13 of USA Network series In Plain Sight, "Let's Get It Ahn", WITSEC workers, Mary and Eleanor, sing along to the song while listening to it being played as hold music. In a Season 3 episode of Home Improvement, "Room for Change" (1994), Al Borland, believing that he is in a sound-proof booth, belts out the first stanza but is heard by everyone.

Other examples of television renditions of the song include the Babylon 5 episode "Atonement", sung by Marcus Cole to irritate fellow passenger Dr. Franklin; The Wind in the Willows episode "A Producer's Lot" (Series 3, Episode 11) sung by Mole (Richard Pearson); the Married... with Children episode "Peggy and the Pirates" (Season 7, Episode 18); the Star Trek: The Next Generation episode "Disaster" and the Star Trek: Short Treks episode "Q&A"; two episodes of Frasier, including "Fathers and Sons", where Martin joins in the song, singing, "With many awful facts about the scary hippopotamus!"; the Mad About You episode "Moody Blues" (Season 6, Episode 5); and the "Deep Space Homer" episode of The Simpsons. Sometimes the song is used in an audition situation. For example, in the Two and a Half Men episode "And the Plot Moistens" (Season 3, Episode 21), Alan sings the first verse of the song to persuade Jake to join the school musical. Similarly, in season 2 of Slings & Arrows, Richard Smith-Jones uses the song to audition for the festival's musical. In the pilot episode of 90210, Annie Wilson sings the beginning of the song in a flash back of her old school performance. In the first episode of the 2020 British miniseries Quiz, about the Charles Ingram cheating scandal, Ingram and another Army officer sing the Major-General's Song.

Parodies or pastiches of the song have been sung in a number of television programs. For example, the animated series ReBoot ended the series (Episode 39: "End Prog") with a recap of the entire show's plot, set to the song's tune. The Studio 60 on the Sunset Strip episode "The Cold Open" (2006), the cast of Studio 60 opens with a parody: "We'll be the very model of a modern network TV show; we hope that you don't mind that our producer was caught doing blow". In Doctor Who and the Pirates, the Doctor (played by Colin Baker) sings, "I am the very model of a Gallifreyan buccaneer". Other songs, from Pirates, Pinafore and Ruddigore, are parodied. When he hosted Saturday Night Live, David Hyde Pierce's monologue was a parody of the song. In the Animaniacs short "H.M.S. Yakko", Yakko sings "I Am the Very Model of a Cartoon Individual". In the Scrubs episode "My Musical", the song is parodied in "The Rant Song" sung by Dr. Cox. In a 2011 GEICO commercial, a couple that wants to save money, but still listen to musicals, finds a roommate, dressed as the Major-General, who awkwardly begins the song while dancing on a coffee table.

=== Other parodies and pastiches ===
The song has been widely parodied and pastiched, including by Tom Lehrer's "Elements Song", "The Unix Sysadmin Song", written for the book The Unix Companion by Harley Hahn, which replaces the military references with Unix trivia, and "Every Major's Terrible", featured in comic No. 1052 on the webcomic xkcd in 2012. This comic then became the subject of numerous musical adaptations. "The Elements" inspired the "Boy Scout Merit Badge Song", listing all the merit badges that can be earned from the Boy Scouts of America. In the video games Mass Effect 2 and Mass Effect 3, the character Dr. Mordin Solus sings a short pastiche version ("I Am the Very Model of a Scientist Salarian").

On the last night of The Proms in 2000, the outgoing conductor, Sir Andrew Davis, sang a pastiche of the song celebrating the festival. When Derek Pattinson retired as Secretary-General of the General Synod of the Church of England in 1990, a choir sang a variation on the Major-General's Song, with the line "He was the very model of a Secretary-General", in a meeting of the General Synod. In 2010, a parody version of the song was posted as an op-ed piece in the Richmond Times-Dispatch mocking actions of the Attorney General of Virginia, Ken Cuccinelli. In 2010, Ron Butler released a YouTube video pastiche of the song, in character as President Obama, that received more than 1.8 million views. A 2015 YouTube parody satirizing county clerk Kim Davis called "The Modern Fundamentalist" was distributed by media outlets.

The character George Washington, in the song "Right Hand Man" from the 2015 musical Hamilton by Lin-Manuel Miranda, refers to himself with irony as "The model of a modern major-general", which he rhymes with "men are all" and "pedestal". Miranda commented: "I always felt like 'mineral' wasn't the best possible rhyme." Stephen Colbert opined that some verses of "Favorite Song" by rap artist Chance the Rapper (featuring Childish Gambino), utilize the same rhythm as the Major-General's Song. Randy Rainbow released a parody of the song in 2018 titled "A Very Stable Genius", which lampoons Donald Trump.
