= New Math (song) =

1965 song by Tom Lehrer

Song by Tom Lehrer

from the album That Was the Year That Was
- Released: 1965
- Genre: Novelty
- Length: 4:28
- Label: Reprise
- Songwriter: Tom Lehrer
- Producer: Jimmy Hilliard

Audio
- file; help

"New Math" is a 1965 song by American musician Tom Lehrer. Found on his album That Was the Year That Was, the song is a satire of the then-contemporary educational concept of New Math.

== Composition ==
The song is composed in the key of C major in a 2/4 time signature. It correctly describes the step-by-step process for subtracting 173 from 342 in decimal and then subtracting the numbers 173_{8} and 342_{8} having the same digits in octal. The song features a spoken-word intro by Lehrer, followed by "piano played at a quick tempo and brisk lines", which is followed by a brief commentary by Lehrer himself.

== Context ==
Lehrer, at the time a doctoral student of mathematics at Harvard University, used the song to satirize the then-new educational concept of New Math, introduced in American schools in the late 1950s and early 1960s as an attempt to reform education of mathematics. According to the book The New Math: A Political History, the song "purported to be a lesson for parents confused by recent changes in their children's arithmetic textbook". The same book states that by the time of the song's release in 1965, the concept was at its peak in American education.

Lehrer's song has been described as "well-informed and literate ... enjoyed by new math proponents and critics alike". Historian Christopher J. Phillips writes that, by including this song among other songs of great political and social import on That Was the Year That Was, Lehrer "seamlessly—and accurately—placed the new math among the major events of the mid-twentieth-century United States".
