= The Vatican Rag =

1965 song by Tom Lehrer

Song by Tom Lehrer

from the album That Was the Year That Was
- Released: 1965
- Recorded: 1965
- Venue: Hungry I, San Francisco, California, U.S.
- Genre: Ragtime; parody
- Songwriter(s): Tom Lehrer

Audio
- file; help

"The Vatican Rag" is a ragtime parody song by American satirist Tom Lehrer. The song purports to be a response to the Second Vatican Council, a meeting that proposed reforms to the Catholic Church. First performed in 1965, it is controversial for its irreverent depiction of Catholic traditions.

== Music and lyrics ==
"The Vatican Rag" takes musical inspiration from ragtime pieces such as "Spaghetti Rag" (1910) and "The Varsity Drag" (1927). A spoken introduction describes the song as a response to the "Vatican II" council—which, among other things, broadened the range of music that could be used in services—and humorously proposes this rag as a more accessible alternative to traditional liturgical music. The song begins:

First you get down on your knees
Fiddle with your rosaries
Bow your head with great respect
And genuflect, genuflect, genuflect!

The lyrics mockingly list a number of Catholic rituals such as confession, the Eucharist, and Rosaries, and suggest the irony of modernizing an age-old institution like the church. Amy Richlin notes that the song is funny "not only because of the words but because it's a rag". According to Jesse David Fox of Vulture, "Lehrer doesn't just poke fun at a sacred cow, he slaughters it." Eruptions of shock and laughter can be heard in recordings as the audience reacts to both the song's blasphemous tone and its creative rhymes.

== Composition and performances ==
In the early 1960s Lehrer wrote satiric topical songs for the US version of the television show That Was the Week That Was. Inspired by the ongoing Second Vatican Council, he composed "The Vatican Rag" during this period, but he decided not to submit it because he thought the show would "[do the song] badly or [take] out the satiric parts". He instead debuted the song at the Hungry I in San Francisco in a series of shows that were recorded for his last album, That Was the Year That Was (1965).

Lehrer later played "The Vatican Rag" in videotaped performances. In April 1967, he played the song on a benefit show for WNET-TV in New York, prompting hundreds of people to complain to the station. In September 1967, Lehrer included "The Vatican Rag" on his Live in Copenhagen TV special recorded in Denmark.

== Reception and legacy ==
Some Catholics criticized "The Vatican Rag" as blasphemous. After one show at the Hungry I, Lehrer's performance of the song led to a confrontation with the actor Ricardo Montalbán, who happened to be in the audience. According to a former Hungry I bouncer, Montalbán approached Lehrer in a fit of rage, yelling, "I love my religion! I will die for my religion!" to which Lehrer responded: "Hey, no problem, as long as you don't fight for your religion." In May 1967, a Putnam County, New York, schoolteacher used Lehrer's "Vatican Rag" and "National Brotherhood Week" as examples of modern satire for her seventh-grade class; the outcry was such that the school board banned the songs and censured the teacher, and she quit three months later and left the area.

Conversely, fans of Lehrer consider the song one of his best compositions. Vulture included the song on its 2016 list of "The 100 Jokes That Shaped Modern Comedy". Stop the Church (1991), a short documentary about an HIV/AIDS demonstration in New York City, uses the song as the background music to church services. In 2000, "The Vatican Rag" was the last song played by the jazz radio station WNOP before it converted to a Catholic talk format.
