= The Old Dope Peddler =

1953 song by Tom Lehrer

Song by Tom Lehrer

from the album Songs by Tom Lehrer
- Released: 1953, 1960
- Genre: Novelty
- Songwriter: Tom Lehrer

Audio
- file; help

"The Old Dope Peddler" is a satirical song by Tom Lehrer. It was on Lehrer's first album, Songs by Tom Lehrer, from 1953, and a new live recording on Tom Lehrer Revisited in 1960.

The song is a parody of a popular tune well known at the time titled "The Old Lamp-Lighter" by Charles Tobias and Nat Simon, which was a hit first for Kay Kyser in 1947, and continued to have popular new recordings to 1960. The verses of the original asserted that

He made the night a little brighter
Wherever he would go
The old lamplighter
Of long, long ago

It goes on to say that if there were sweethearts in the dark, "he'd pass the light and leave it dark", and concludes by explaining that now, the old lamplighter turns the stars on at night and turns them off at dawn.

Lehrer's parody switches the song's protagonist to "the Old Dope Peddler" selling "powdered happiness". It has lines like this:

He gives the kids free samples
because he knows full well
that today's young, innocent faces
will be tomorrow's clientele

The song was banned from broadcast by the BBC.

Lehrer's performance is sampled in the track "Dope Peddler" by U.S. rapper 2 Chainz on his 2012 album Based on a T.R.U. Story. In 2013, Lehrer said he was "very proud" to have his 60-year-old song sampled. His response to the request to use the song was "I grant you motherfuckers permission to do this. Please give my regards to Mr. Chainz, or may I call him 2?".

"The Old Dope Peddler" was also sampled on UK electronica duo Akasha's track "Interzone (Tapping a Guitar with Beef on a Lonely Summer Day in Menlo Park)", remixed by Menlo Park on the 1999 album Cinematique – The Remixes. The song was also covered by Mitch Benn and Meat Puppets.
