= The Elements (song) =

1959 song by Tom Lehrer and Arthur Sullivan

The periodic table of the chemical elements

The Elements
Lehrer sings "The Elements"

"The Elements" is a 1959 song with lyrics by musical humorist, mathematician and lecturer Tom Lehrer, which recites the names of all the chemical elements known at the time of writing, up to number 102, nobelium. Lehrer arranged the music of the song from the tune of the "Major-General's Song" from The Pirates of Penzance by Gilbert and Sullivan. The song can be found on Lehrer's albums Tom Lehrer in Concert, More of Tom Lehrer and An Evening Wasted with Tom Lehrer.

The song is also included in the musical revue Tom Foolery, along with many of Lehrer's other songs.

== Description ==
The ordering of elements in the lyrics fits the meter of the song, and includes much alliteration, and thus has little or no relation to the ordering in the periodic table. This can be seen for example in the opening and closing lines:

There's antimony, arsenic, aluminum, selenium,
And hydrogen and oxygen and nitrogen and rhenium,
...
And argon, krypton, neon, radon, xenon, zinc, and rhodium,
And chlorine, carbon, cobalt, copper, tungsten, tin, and sodium.
These are the only ones of which the news has come to Harvard,
And there may be many others, but they haven't been discovered.

Lehrer had been a mathematics student and lecturer at Harvard; in the closing lines of the song, he pronounced "Harvard" and "discovered", affecting a Northeastern elite accent to make the two words rhyme. He accompanied himself on the piano while singing the song.

== Background ==
The music of "The Elements" is arranged from the tune of the "Major-General's Song" from The Pirates of Penzance by Gilbert and Sullivan. Lehrer also drew inspiration from the song "Tschaikowsky (and Other Russians)", written by Ira Gershwin, which listed fifty Russian composers in a similar manner.

"The Elements" differs musically from the "Major-General's Song" in that:

- It omits the third verse of the original as well as all of the choral "responses", and it adds an extra two lines at the end of the last verse.
- Lehrer simplifies the melody by primarily singing each phrase on a single note, instead of rapidly moving back and forth between two different notes as in Sullivan's original melody.
- It is in the key of C, while the "Major-General's Song" is in E-flat.
- On some of the live recordings, Lehrer pauses in the middle for spoken interludes, in which he talks to the audience (e.g., "I hope you're all taking notes, because there's going to be a short quiz next period!") while vamping on the piano.
- The song ends with a piano coda: "Shave and a Haircut".

In some live performances, after the song was finished, Lehrer joked that an earlier version, from Aristotle's time, lists only the classical elements: Earth, Air, Fire and Water, explaining that "life was much simpler in those days".

== In popular culture ==
"The Elements" has been featured in popular culture many times. In the episode "Ex-File" of NCIS, Timothy McGee and Abby Sciuto hum the song, which forms a key clue in their case. In The Big Bang Theory episode "The Pants Alternative" (2010), a drunk Sheldon Cooper starts to sing the song during his acceptance of an award from his university. In the 2006 episode of Gilmore Girls called "The Real Paul Anka", Luke Danes's daughter April and her classmates sing the song on the bus. Daniel Radcliffe sang "The Elements" on The Graham Norton Show in 2010. David Costabile, as Gale Boetticher, sang along to the song in "Something Beautiful", a 2018 episode of Better Call Saul.

Cover recordings include Jesse Dangerously on his 2004 album How to Express Your Dissenting Political Viewpoint Through Origami, where the song is titled "Tom Lehrer's The Elements".
