= An Evening Wasted with Tom Lehrer =

Live album by Tom Lehrer
- Released: 1959
- Recorded: March 1959
- Genre: Satire
- Length: 42:23
- Labels: Lehrer Records; Reprise/Warner Bros. Records

Tom Lehrer chronology
Songs by Tom Lehrer (1953)	An Evening Wasted with Tom Lehrer (1959)	More of Tom Lehrer (1959)

Professional ratings
Review scores
Source	Rating
Allmusic	5/5 stars

An Evening Wasted with Tom Lehrer is an album recorded by Tom Lehrer, the well-known satirist and Harvard lecturer. The recording was made on March 20–21, 1959 in Sanders Theater at Harvard.

In October 2020, Lehrer transferred the music and lyrics for all songs he had ever written into the public domain. In November 2022, he formally relinquished the copyright and performing/recording rights on his songs, making all music and lyrics composed by him free for anyone to use.

== Track listing ==
1. "Poisoning Pigeons in the Park" – 2:38
2. "Bright College Days" – 3:03
3. "A Christmas Carol" – 2:54
4. "The Elements" – 2:16
5. "Oedipus Rex" – 3:41
6. "In Old Mexico" – 6:26
7. "Clementine" – 4:40
8. "It Makes a Fellow Proud to Be a Soldier" – 2:40
9. "She's My Girl" – 2:53
10. "The Masochism Tango" – 3:30
11. "We Will All Go Together When We Go" – 5:32

== Songs' sources ==
=== "Poisoning Pigeons in the Park" ===
The lyrics refer to killing pigeons with cyanide-coated peanuts and strychnine-treated corn. The latter method was used by the United States Fish and Wildlife Service to control pigeon populations in Boston public areas during the 1950s. The pianist hired for an orchestral version of the song, arranged and conducted by Richard Hayman with vocals by Lehrer, fell off his bench when he heard the title.

=== "Bright College Days" ===
This song borrows heavily from "The Whiffenpoof Song", the traditional signature song of the Yale Whiffenpoofs, and is written as a parody of the typical college alma mater.

=== "The Elements" ===
The lyrics of "The Elements" are a recitation of the names of all the chemical elements that were known at the time of writing, up to number 102, nobelium; sixteen more have been discovered since then. It can be found on his albums Songs & More Songs by Tom Lehrer as well as An Evening Wasted with Tom Lehrer. The song is sung to the tune of Sir Arthur Sullivan's "Major General's Song" ("I am the very model of a modern major-general...") from The Pirates of Penzance. At his concert in Copenhagen (1967), Lehrer admitted, "I like to play this song every once in a while, just to see if I can still do it!" Indeed, several of Lehrer's fans, such as actor Daniel Radcliffe, have tried and failed to sing it (that is, he sang it in its entirety, but with slight hiccups). At some concerts he also played a version he claims is based on Aristotle's elements: "There's earth and air and fire and water."

=== "Oedipus Rex" ===
Lehrer comments that most popular movies of the time have a catchy title song that helps to draw in audiences. Believing that a recent (1957) film adaptation of Sophocles' play Oedipus Rex had failed at the box office because it did not have such a song, he wrote this one in ragtime style. It was also a reference to the popularity of Freudian psychoanalysis and the Oedipus complex in popular culture in the 1940s and 1950s in the United States.

=== "In Old Mexico" ===
This song is prefaced by a lengthy commentary about the (fictional) Dr. Samuel Gall, who gained fame and fortune from his "invention" of the gallbladder. Performed in the style of Mexican folk music, it describes the narrator's memory of a trip to that country and his viewing of a bullfight. The lyrics refer to three famous Spanish bullfighters, Belmonte, Dominguín, and Manolete, and also include a pejorative reference to Mexico as "the land of the wetback."

=== "Clementine" ===
"Clementine" is a parody of the old folk song "Oh My Darling, Clementine," with each verse performed in a different style. Lehrer refers to Cole Porter, operatic arias such as those in the works of Mozart, the "cool" school of jazz improvisation, and Gilbert and Sullivan.

=== "It Makes a Fellow Proud to Be a Soldier" ===
A parody of the official songs in use by the various branches of the United States military. Lehrer explains that the Army "didn't have no official song" when he started basic training; he wrote this one in an attempt to remedy the situation. (The branch adopted "The Army Goes Rolling Along" as its song in 1956, one year after Lehrer enlisted.)

One of the rare parodies of Lehrer's work emerged in Jim Bouton's classic book Ball Four: "It Makes a Fellow Proud to be an Astro", conjured up by members of the 1969 Houston Astros.
