= That Was the Year That Was =

Live album by Tom Lehrer
- Released: 1965
- Recorded: July 1965
- Genre: Satire
- Length: 37:11
- Label: Reprise/Warner Bros. Records
- Producer: Jimmy Hilliard

Tom Lehrer chronology
Revisited (1960)	That Was the Year That Was (1965)

Professional ratings
Review scores
Source	Rating
Allmusic	4.5/5 stars

That Was the Year That Was (1965) is a live album recorded at the Hungry I in San Francisco, containing performances by Tom Lehrer of satiric topical songs he originally wrote for the NBC television series That Was the Week That Was, known informally as TW3 (1964–65). All of the songs related to items then in the news. The album peaked at #18 on Billboard's Top 200 Albums on January 8, 1966 and was on the chart for 51 weeks. The album reached #5 on the Canadian GMP/AC chart.

In October 2020, Lehrer transferred the music and lyrics for all songs he had ever written into the public domain. In November 2022, he formally relinquished the copyright and performing/recording rights on his songs, making all music and lyrics composed by him free for anyone to use.

== Track listing ==
Side one:

1. "National Brotherhood Week" – 2:35
2. "MLF Lullaby" – 2:25
3. "George Murphy" – 2:08
4. "The Folk Song Army" – 2:12
5. "Smut" – 3:15
6. "Send the Marines" – 1:46
7. "Pollution" – 2:17

Side two:

1. "So Long, Mom (A Song for World War III)" – 2:23
2. "Whatever Became of Hubert?" – 2:13
3. "New Math" – 4:28
4. "Alma" – 5:27
5. "Who's Next?" – 2:00
6. "Wernher von Braun" – 1:46
7. "The Vatican Rag" – 2:14

== Topics of songs ==
Side one

- "National Brotherhood Week" – race relations in the US, specifically, a week-long program sponsored by the National Conference for Community and Justice (NCCJ) held generally during the third week of February from the 1940s through the 1980s. The lyrics juxtapose actress and civil rights activist Lena Horne with Jim Clark, an Alabama county sheriff notorious for using excessive force to quell civil rights protests.
- "MLF Lullaby" – an ultimately failed US proposal for a multilateral nuclear force as part of NATO.
- "George Murphy" – George Murphy, dancer, actor and recently-elected junior senator for California. Democratic voters of the time questioned whether an actor with no political experience could function as a Senator. Lehrer also criticizes Murphy's comments about Mexicans working in the US, and refers briefly to the then-nascent political career of Ronald Reagan. He makes an additional quip about the state of Massachusetts being the only one with three United States Senators – a reference to Robert F. Kennedy, who was a native of that state but was representing New York in the Senate at the time.
- "The Folk Song Army" – the folk revival of the 1960s, and specifically what Lehrer perceived to be the futility of protest music. Alludes to songs of the Republican side in the Spanish Civil War, especially "Venga Jaleo", which it excerpts musically.
- "Smut" – censorship of obscenity, and the 1957 US Supreme Court case Roth v. United States. The song refers to Fanny Hill, which at the time of the recording was engaged in an anti-obscenity case, Memoirs v Massachusetts, that would not be resolved until the following year. It also references Lady Chatterley's Lover, which had been subject to a similar case, R v Penguin Books Ltd, in Britain in 1960.
- "Send the Marines" – US interventionist policy in other, usually weaker, countries, the most recent example being the deployment of the US Marine Corps in the Dominican Civil War in April 1965. In 2003, former chief UN weapons inspector Hans Blix told a Swedish radio program that he did not think that the invasion of Iraq, "in the way it was justified, was compatible with the UN Charter," and then had the station play this song.
- "Pollution" – environmental pollution. According to the liner notes of the album, this was the San Francisco version of the song, featuring the lines: "The breakfast garbage that you throw into the Bay / They drink at lunch in San Jose". Lehrer altered the lyrics to suit the city or state in which he was performing at the time; for example, the version Lehrer performed in New York version referred respectively to Troy and Perth Amboy.

Side two

- "So Long, Mom (A Song for World War III)" – nuclear war, mutually assured destruction, nostalgia over past wars, and television news. References a 1904 George M. Cohan song and show, Little Johnny Jones.
- "Whatever Became of Hubert?" – Hubert Humphrey, then US Vice President under Lyndon B. Johnson, and frustrations among liberals over Humphrey's perceived quiescence to the more domineering figure of Johnson.
- "New Math" – New Math, a trend at the time in the teaching of mathematics.
- "Alma" – the late Alma Mahler, a composer, painter, and the wife, successively, of Gustav Mahler, Walter Gropius, and Franz Werfel.
- "Who's Next?" – nuclear proliferation. Lists numerous countries that either had already achieved the capacity to deploy nuclear weapons or could potentially do so.
- "Wernher Von Braun" – German-American rocket scientist Wernher von Braun, who had helped develop the V-2 rocket for Nazi Germany before relocating to the US under Operation Paperclip and leading the US rocket development program during the 1960s.
- "The Vatican Rag" – the Second Vatican Council and the reform of Roman Catholic liturgy. (Upon performing this song in the hungry i nightclub in San Francisco, Lehrer was harshly criticized by actor Ricardo Montalbán, who happened to be in the audience that night. Montalbán shouted "How dare you make fun of my religion! I love my religion! I will die for my religion!" To which Lehrer responded "Hey, no problem, as long as you don't fight for your religion.")
