= Fight Fiercely, Harvard =

1945 song by Tom Lehrer

"Fight Fiercely Harvard"

Song by Tom Lehrer
- Released: 1945
- Genre: Novelty, fight song
- Songwriter: Tom Lehrer

Audio
- As recorded on Songs by Tom Lehrer, 1953: file; help

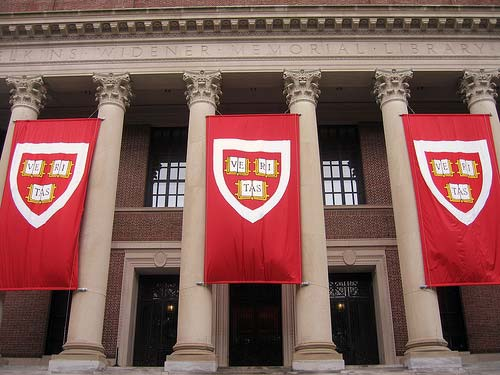
The Widener Library at Harvard University

"Fight Fiercely, Harvard" is a satirical college fight song written and originally performed by Tom Lehrer and dedicated to his alma mater, Harvard University. The song was written in 1945 while Lehrer was in his second year of study at Harvard College.

== History ==
The song was Lehrer's earliest—and for a while his only—musical work and was included on Songs by Tom Lehrer, a debut album recorded at Trans Radio Studios, Boston, on January 22, 1953. Starting with a press run of 400 copies of the then-novel 10" LP record format produced by Lehrer at his own expense, these records were sold in stores around Harvard Square.

In speaking about "Fight Fiercely, Harvard" and the rest of his satirical repertoire that brought him a certain level of fame as an undergraduate, Lehrer says he did not write to gain popularity but rather:

I mostly thought these songs weren’t of interest to anyone! I wrote ‘Fight Fiercely, Harvard’ in 1945. That’s the earliest song on any of my records. The others were written a little later. I wrote a lot of songs for special occasions ... silly songs, songs about math, and so on, but nothing else that would be recordable until 1948.

Lehrer has also said of his undergraduate songwriting:

The only one of those songs that eventually made it into my repertoire was 'Fight Fiercely, Harvard,' which was written in 1945 and shows it. I started singing these songs at parties, but never with the intention of their becoming commercial.

Lehrer later responded to rumors that he had stopped performing because the displeasure of Harvard University's administration over the satirical lyrics of "Fight Fiercely, Harvard" threatened to ruin his career, by saying:

...my stimulus came from humor however grim the humor may have been at the base. I wasn't burning when I wrote these songs...it amazes me that anyone would think a song making fun of the football team was grounds for expulsion.

Today "Fight Fiercely, Harvard" lives on in the repertoire of the Harvard University Band and was included on their 75th anniversary album released in 1995. The song remains fairly well known in the Harvard community. On visiting Harvard for the first time in decades, Lehrer was pleased to find that his song had been performed at every home football game for many years.

== Theme ==
Fight Fiercely, Harvard (live)

The humor of "Fight Fiercely, Harvard" revolves around the supposedly refined and gentlemanly nature of Harvard athletes. As it appears on Tom Lehrer Revisited, a live album, it is preceded by banter almost as long as the song. In talking to his audience, Lehrer explains that he wanted to create a college fight song different from those performed, as he says with a hypercorrective use of a Latin plural for a common English word, "in comparable stadia." This preamble also says, in part:

…I was reminded not too long ago, upon returning from my lesson with the Scrabble pro at the Harvard Club in Boston, of the days of my undergraduacy long ago when there used to be these very long Saturday afternoons in the fall with nothing to do—the library was closed—just waiting around for the cocktail parties to begin. And on occasions like that…one did come to realize that the football fight songs that one hears…have a tendency to be somewhat uncouth, and even violent, and that it would be refreshing, to say the least, to find one that was a bit more genteel. And here it is, dedicated to my own alma mater, and called Fight Fiercely, Harvard.

The lyrics are written with an exaggeratedly erudite style of diction and say in part:

Fight fiercely, Harvard!
Fight, fight, fight!
Demonstrate to them our skill.
Albeit they possess the might,
Nonetheless we have the will.

The lyrics also refer to celebrating victory by inviting the "whole team up for tea" and conscientiously warn "let's try not to injure them." Lehrer, who was actually Jewish and from New York City, performed the song in the stereotypical Boston Brahmin accent of his on-stage persona and pronounced the words "fiercely" and "Harvard" with a non-rhotic drawl. He also injected exclamations such as "...and do fight fiercely!"

== See also ==
- "Harvardiana", a song which refers to Harvard's rivalry with Yale
