= Dee Dee Bridgewater discography =

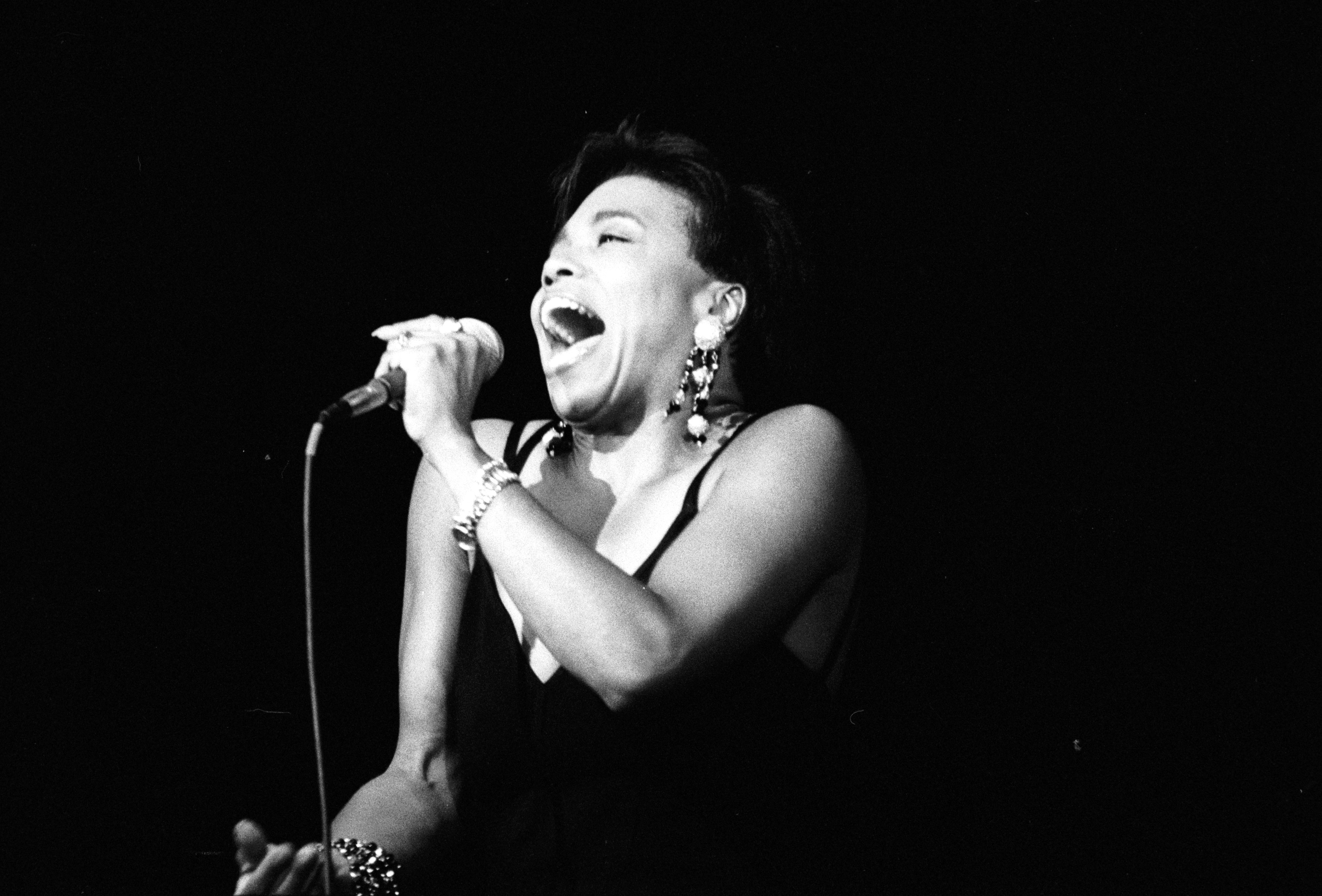
- Dee Dee Bridgewater performing in 1990.
- Studio albums: 17
- Live albums: 3
- Compilation albums: 4
- Singles: 19
- Album appearances: 19

The discography of American singer, Dee Dee Bridgewater contains 17 studio albums, four compilation albums, three live albums, 19 singles and 19 album appearances. Her first release was the 1974 studio album, Afro Blue. In 1976, Atlantic released her self-titled second studio album. Bridgewater's next three studio albums were issued by Elektra Records. The first was 1978's Just Family, which reached number 170 on the US Billboard 200 and number 13 on the US Billboard Jazz Albums chart. Its title track went into the top 100 of the US Billboard R&B songs chart. It was followed in 1979 by Bad for Me, which reached number 182 on the Billboard 200, number 30 on the Jazz chart and number 57 on the US R&B albums chart. Its title track made the top 40 of the US R&B chart and the top 75 of US Dance Club Songs chart. In 1980, her second self-titled studio album was released and spawned the R&B single, "One in a Million (Guy)".

Her next release did not come until 1987's Live in Paris, followed by the Polydor studio effort, Victim of Love (1989). A duet with Ray Charles ("Precious Thing") reached the top 20 on the French songs chart. In 1993, Keeping Tradition was released by the Verve label and was proceeded by Love and Peace: A Tribute to Horace Silver, which made the top 20 of the US Traditional Jazz Albums chart in 1995. The 1997 studio album, Dear Ella, reached number five on the Jazz Albums chart and number 46 on the French albums chart. Verve also issued the top 20 Jazz album, Live at Yoshi's in 2000 and the top ten Jazz albums in 2002, This Is New.

In 2005, Bridgewater released the French product, J'ai deux amours and in 2007 released the English language product, Red Earth: A Malian's Journey. In 2010, EmArcy Records released Eleanora Fagan (1915–1959): To Billie with Love from Dee Dee Bridgewater. All three products made the top 20 of the Traditional Jazz Albums chart and the top 40 of the Jazz chart. In 2011, the compilation, Midnight Sun, made the top 20 of the Jazz chart and the top ten of the Traditional Jazz chart. The 2015 studio album, Dee Dee's Feathers, made it to number 11 on the Jazz chart, number six on the Traditional Jazz chart and number 153 on the French chart. The 2017 studio album, Memphis... Yes, I'm Ready, was a top ten Jazz and Traditional Jazz album, while also climbing to number 123 on the French chart. Her most recent album is 2025's Elemental.

== Albums ==
=== Studio albums ===
List of albums, with selected chart positions and certifications, showing other relevant details
Title	Album details	Peak chart positions					
Title	Album details	US	US Jazz	US Jazz Trad	US R&B	BEL	FRA
Afro Blue	Released: 1974; Label: Trio; Formats: LP	—	—	—	—	—	—
Dee Dee Bridgewater	Released: 1976; Label: Atlantic; Formats: LP, cassette	—	—	—	—	—	—
Just Family	Released: June 1978; Label: Elektra; Formats: LP	170	13	—	—	—	—
Bad for Me	Released: 1979; Label: Elektra; Formats: LP	182	30	—	57	—	—
Dee Dee Bridgewater	Released: 1980; Label: Elektra; Formats: LP	—	—	—	—	—	—
Victim of Love	Released: 1989; Label: Polydor; Formats: LP, CD, cassette	—	—	—	—	—	—
Keeping Tradition	Released: 1993; Label: Verve; Formats: CD, cassette	—	—	—	—	—	—
Love and Peace: A Tribute to Horace Silver	Released: September 26, 1995; Label: Verve; Formats: CD, cassette	—	47	13	—	—	—
Prelude to a Kiss: The Duke Ellington Album	Released: October 8, 1996; Label: Philips; Formats: CD, cassette	—	—	—	—	—	—
Dear Ella	Released: September 30, 1997; Label: Verve; Formats: CD	—	5	12	—	—	46
This Is New	Released: May 21, 2002; Label: Verve; Formats: CD	—	26	7	—	—	117
J'ai deux amours	Released: July 5, 2005; Label: DDB; Formats: CD	—	37	16	—	54	25
Red Earth: A Malian Journey	Released: April 17, 2007; Label: DDB; Formats: CD, digital	—	31	16	—	93	53
Eleanora Fagan (1915–1959): To Billie with Love from Dee Dee Bridgewater	Released: March 15, 2010; Label: EmArcy; Formats: CD, digital	—	19	14	—	—	134
Dee Dee's Feathers	Released: August 14, 2015; Label: OKeh/Sony Masterworks; Formats: CD, digital	—	11	6	—	—	158
Memphis... Yes, I'm Ready	Released: September 15, 2017; Label: OKeh/Sony Masterworks; Formats: CD, digital	—	10	6	—	—	123
Elemental	Released: June 13, 2025; Label: Mack Avenue; Formats: LP, CD, digital	—	—	—	—	—	—
"—" denotes a recording that did not chart or was not released in that territory.

=== Compilation albums ===
List of albums, with selected chart positions, showing other relevant details
Title	Album details	Peak chart positions	
Title	Album details	US Jazz	US Jazz Trad
Dee Dee Bridgewater	Released: 1995; Label: MCA; Formats: CD	—	—
Midnight Sun	Released: August 26, 2011; Label: Decca/EmArcy; Formats: CD, digital	20	9
This Is Dee Bridgewater	Released: 2015; Label: Decca; Formats: CD	—	—
Dee Dee's Diamonds	Released: September 18, 2020; Label: Warner; Formats: Digital	—	—
"—" denotes a recording that did not chart or was not released in that territory.

=== Live albums ===
List of albums, with selected chart positions, showing other relevant details
Title	Album details	Peak chart positions	
Title	Album details	US Jazz	US Jazz Trad
Live in Paris	Released: 1987; Label: Impulse!/Just In/Charly; Formats: CD, cassette	—	—
In Montreux	Released: 1990; Label: Polydor; Formats: CD, cassette	—	—
Live at Yoshi's	Released: February 15, 2000; Label: Verve; Label: CD	20	44
"—" denotes a recording that did not chart or was not released in that territory.

== Singles ==
List of singles, with selected chart positions, showing other relevant details
Title	Year	Peak chart positions			Album
Title	Year	US Dan	US R&B	FRA	Album
"Goin' Through the Motions"	1976	—	—	—	Dee Dee Bridgewater (1976)
"My Prayer"	1976	—	—	—	Dee Dee Bridgewater (1976)
"Just Family"	1978	—	95	—	Just Family
"Sweet Rain"	1978	—	—	—	Just Family
"Bad for Me"	1979	72	37	—	Bad for Me
"Don't Say It (If You Don't Mean It)"	1979	—	—	—	Bad for Me
"One in a Million (Guy)"	1980	—	52	—	Dee Dee Bridgewater (1980)
"When Love Comes Knockin'"	1980	—	—	—	Dee Dee Bridgewater (1980)
"Precious Thing" (with Ray Charles)	1989	—	—	19	Victim of Love
"Heartache Caravan"	1989	—	—	—	Victim of Love
"Angel Of The Night (Uomini Soli)"	1990	—	—	—	—N/a
"Just a Feeling"	1990	—	—	—	—N/a
"People and Places" (with Phillip Bailey)	1994	—	—	—	La Vengeance d'une blonde (soundtrack)
"The Jody Grind"	1995	—	—	—	Love and Peace: A Tribute to Horace Silver
"I Believe (Je crois)"	1997	—	—	—	A Hymn for the World
"Opopomoz Blues" (with GeGè Telesforo)	2003	—	—	—	Opopomoz (soundtrack)
"J'ai Deux Amours"	2005	—	—	—	J'ai Deux Amours
"Children Go Round (Demissenw)"	2008	—	—	—	—N/a
"What a Wonderful World" (with Irvin Mayfield, New Orleans Jazz Orchestra and featuring Dr. John)	2015	—	—	—	Dee Dee's Feathers
"—" denotes a recording that did not chart or was not released in that territory.

== Other album appearances ==
As guest

- Frank Foster – The Loud Minority (Mainstream, 1972)
- Stanley Clarke – Children of Forever (Polydor, 1973)
- Roy Ayers – Coffy (Polydor, 1973) – as Denise Bridgewater
- Buddy Terry – Lean on Him (Mainstream, 1973)
- Norman Connors – Love from the Sun (Buddah, 1974)
- Cecil McBee – Mutima (Strata-East, 1974)
- Charles Sullivan – Genesis (Strata-East, 1974)
- Carlos Garnett — Black Love (Muse, 1974)
- Stanley Clarke – I Wanna Play for You (Nemperor, 1979)
- Hollywood Bowl Orchestra – Prelude to a Kiss: The Duke Ellington Album (Philips Classics, 1996)
- Ray Brown — Some of My Best Friends Are...Singers (Telarc, 1998)
- BWB – Groovin' (Warner Bros., 2002)
- Christian McBride – Conversations with Christian (Mack Avenue, 2011)

Film soundtrack

- Coffy (dir. Jack Hill, 1973) — performer: "Coffy Baby", "Coffy Is the Color (Main Title)" – as Denise Bridgewater
- Try This One for Size (dir. Guy Hamilton, 1989)
- The Brother from Another Planet (dir. John Sayles, 1984) — performer: "Getaway", "Boss of the Block"
- Présumé dangereux (dir. Georges Lautner, 1990) — performer: "Turning Round"
- Monster-in-Law (dir. Robert Luketic, 2005) — performer: "Into My Soul"
- Elsa & Fred (dir. Michael Radford, 2014) — performer: "Step 1"
