= My Ship =

1941 song by Kurt Weill and Ira Gershwin

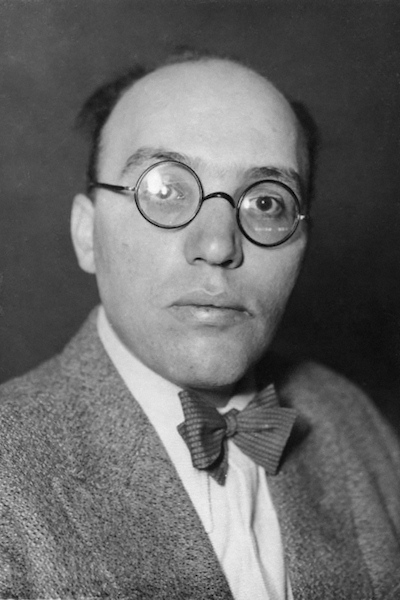
Composer Kurt Weill

"My Ship" is a popular song written for the 1941 Broadway musical Lady in the Dark, with music by Kurt Weill and lyrics by Ira Gershwin.

The music is marked "Andante espressivo"; Gershwin describes it as "orchestrated by Kurt to sound sweet and simple at times, mysterious and menacing at other".

It was premiered by Gertrude Lawrence in the role of Liza Elliott, the editor of a fashion magazine. In the context of the show, the song comes in a sequence in which Elliott, in psychoanalysis, recalls a turn-of-the-century song she knew in her childhood.

The song was not included in the 1944 Hollywood film Lady in the Dark, a fact which Ira Gershwin found inexplicable:

Later, when Lady in the Dark was filmed, the script necessarily had many references to the song. But for some unfathomable reason the song itself—as essential to this musical drama as a stolen necklace or a missing will to a melodrama—was omitted. Although the film was successful financially, audiences evidently were puzzled or felt thwarted or something, because items began to appear in movie-news columns mentioning that the song frequently referred to in Lady in the Dark was 'My Ship'. I hold a brief for Hollywood, having been more or less a movie-goer since I was nine; but there are times ...

— Ira Gershwin

In 2003, Herbie Hancock won the Grammy Award for Best Jazz Instrumental Solo for a version of this song released on the album Directions in Music: Live at Massey Hall.

== Cover versions ==
Artists who have recorded the song include (in alphabetical order):

- Ernestine Anderson – The Toast of the Nation's Critics (1958)
- Jane Ira Bloom – Sixteen Sunsets (2013)
- Betty Buckley – An Evening at Carnegie Hall (1996)
- Dee Dee Bridgewater – This Is New (Verve, 2002), Midnight Sun (Decca, 2011)
- Rosemary Clooney – Show Tunes (Concord, 1989)
- Miles Davis with Gil Evans – Miles Ahead (Columbia, 1957)
- Steve Davis – Eloquence (2009)
- Doris Day – I Have Dreamed (1961)
- Ella Fitzgerald and Joe Pass - Easy Living (1986)
- Judy Garland (1953)
- Herbie Hancock, Michael Brecker, Roy Hargrove – Directions in Music: Live at Massey Hall (2002)
- Johnny Hartman – The Voice That Is! (1964), Hartman for Lovers (2010)
- Hildegarde - My Ship (1941)
- Hugh Masekela – Almost Like Being in Jazz (Chissa, 2005)
- Sarah Vaughan – Great Songs From Hit Shows (1956)

A few notes of the song are sung in a Sesame Street cartoon sequence promoting the letter R from the show's premiere 1969–70 season.
