= Hein van de Geyn =

Dutch jazz musician, composer and band leader

Hein Van de Geyn
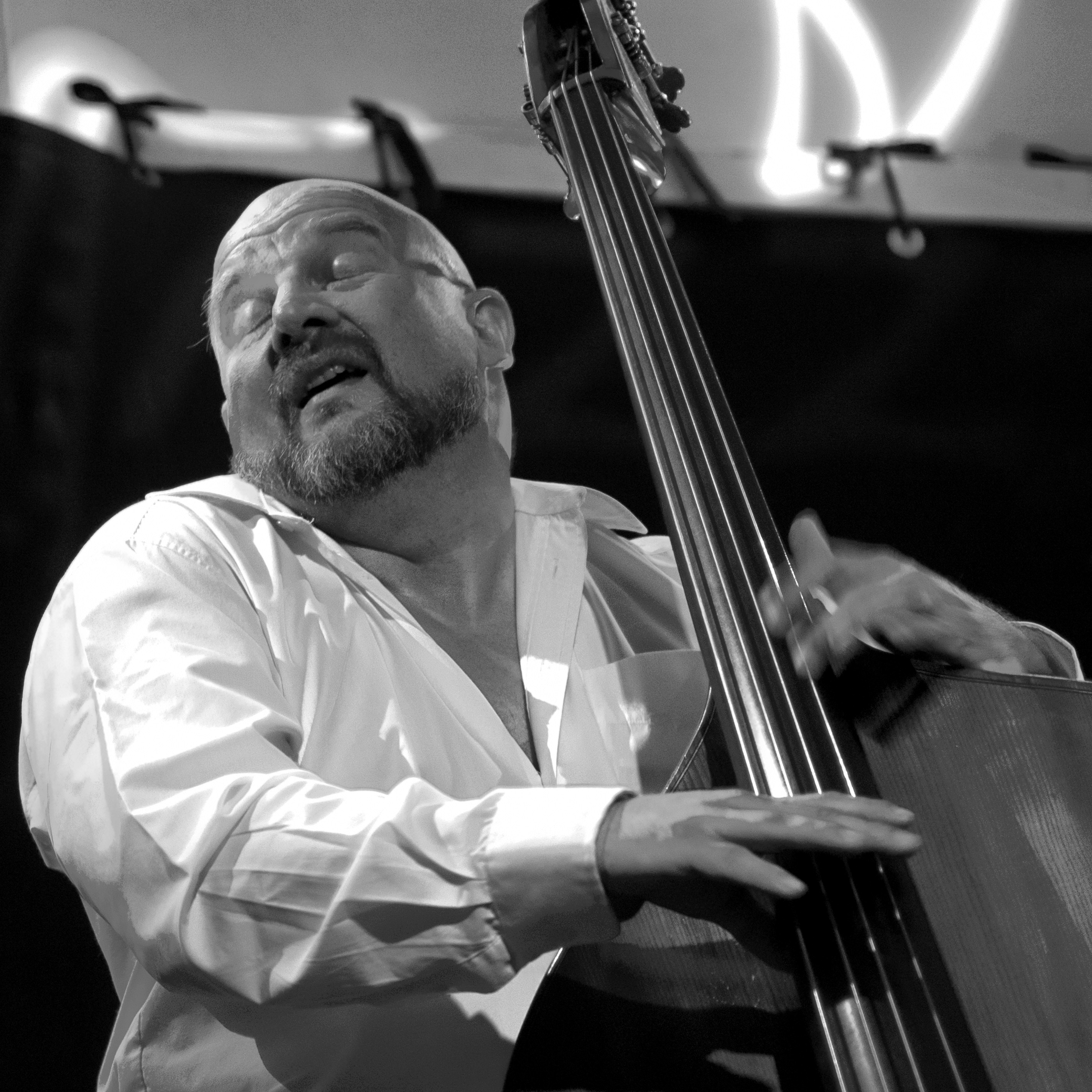

Background information
- Born: 18 July 1956 (age 70); Schijndel, North Brabant, Netherlands
- Genres: Jazz
- Occupation: Musician
- Instrument: Double bass
- Years active: 1970s–present
- Label: Challenge
- Website: baselinemusic.nl

Hein van de Geyn (born 18 July 1956) is a jazz double bassist, composer and band leader from the Netherlands. Van de Geyn also teaches double bass and music.

== Early life ==
Hein van de Geyn was born in Schijndel, Netherlands on 18 July 1956. He studied classical violin for 15 years and started on electric bass guitar when a teenager. He studied classical music at a Tilburg conservatory from 1974 to 1979, and then jazz double bass at a Rotterdam conservatory until 1980.

== Career ==
He lived and worked in Seattle in 1980 and San Francisco the following year. He returned to Europe in 1983. He began playing with Philip Catherine in 1985. Van de Geyn toured with Chet Baker between 1985 and 1988, including Japan in 1987. Another multi-year association was with Dee Dee Bridgewater (1988–96). In 1990 he recorded with Lee Konitz; the two also played as a duo during the following two years. In 1994 he formed the band Baseline with John Abercrombie and Joe LaBarbera.

Also in 1994, Van de Geyn co-founded the jazz label Challenge Records, for which he was in charge of artists and repertoire. Challenge Jazz was spun out from the parent and has been owned since 2005 by Hein van de Geyn. In 2019 the label was acquired by Wigt International that released the catalogue under the name Baseline Jazz Records.

In 1996 he became head of the bass section in the jazz department of the Royal Conservatory of The Hague.

== Awards and honors ==
- 1978 Best Soloist, Laren Jazz Competition
- 1996 Prins Bernhard Music Award
- 1998 Bird Award, North Sea Jazz Festival
- 1998 Best European Bass Player, RTBF and VRT

== Discography ==
=== As leader ===
- Hein van de Geyn Meets Lee Konitz (September, 1990)
- Why Really with Baseline (Challenge, 1994)
- Standards with Baseline (Challenge, 1995)
- Returns with Baseline (Challenge, 1996)
- Woodwind Works (Challenge, 2000)
- Deja Vu with Baseline (Challenge, 2000)
- The Long Journey with Jean-Michel Pilc (A-Records, 2001)
- The Guitar Album with Baseline (Challenge, 2006)
- Meeting Again with Lee Konitz (Challenge, 2007)

=== As sideman ===
With Chet Baker

- Hazy Hugs (Challenge, 1985) with Amstel Octet
- Chet's Choice (Criss Cross, 1985) with Philip Catherine
- Memories (King, 1987)
- Four (King, 1987)
- Almost Blue (Chet Baker in Tokyo) (1987)

With Dee Dee Bridgewater

- In Montreux (Polydor, 1992)
- Keeping Tradition (Verve, 1993)
- Love and Peace: A Tribute to Horace Silver (Verve, 1994)

With Deborah Brown

- Euroboppin with Johnny Griffin (Alfa, 1986)
- International Incident (33 Jazz, 1994)

With Philip Catherine

- Transparence (Inakustic, 1986)
- Oscar (Igloo, 1988)
- September Sky (September, 1988)
- I Remember You (Criss Cross, 1991)
- Moods Volume I (Criss Cross, 1992)
- Moods Volume II (Criss Cross, 1992)
- Live (Dreyfus, 1996)
- Blue Prince (Dreyfus, 2000)
- Concert in Cap Breton (Dreyfus, 2010)

With Tete Montoliu

- Catalonian Rhapsody (Alfa Jazz, 1992)
- Music for Ana (Mas, 1992)

With Enrico Pieranunzi

- Seaward (Soul Note, 1995)
- Don't Forget the Poet (Challenge, 1999)
- Music of Wayne Shorter (Challenge, 2000)
- Improvised Forms (Challenge, 2000)
- Alone Together with Philip Catherine (Challenge, 2000)
- Live in Paris (Challenge, 2001)

With Toots Thielemans

- Chez Toots (Private Music, 1996)
- Live (Challenge, 2007)

With others

- Tommy Flanagan and Hank Jones, Live in Marciac (TCB, 1993)
- Johnny Griffin, Live at the Bim House (Challenge, 1999)
- Lee Konitz, Dialogues (Challenge, 1997)
- Joe Lovano, Solid Steps (Jazz Club, 1986)
- Jeanfrançois Prins with Fred Hersch and Judy Niemack, Beauty and the Prince (AMC, 1993)
- Larry Schneider, Milanka (Timeless, 1987)
- Bobby Watson, In the Groove (Challenge, 1999)
- Kenny Werner, Collaboration (Challenge, 2012)
- Kenny Wheeler, California Daydream (Musidisc, 1991)

=== As producer ===
With John Abercrombie

- That's for Sure (Challenge, 2000) with Kenny Wheeler
- Brand New (Challenge, 2003) with Kenny Wheeler
- Topics (Challenge, 2006)

With Nat Adderley

- Good Company (Challenge, 1994)

With Bob Brookmeyer

- Walzing With Zoe (Challenge, 2001)
- Get Well Soon (Challenge, 2003)

With Philip Catherine

- Live (Dreyfus, 1996)
- Cole Porter Songbook (Challenge, 2010)
- Guitars Two (Dreyfus, 2007)
- Cote Jardin (Challenge, 2012)

With Harmen Fraanje

- Sonatala (Challenge, 2003)
- Ronja (Challenge, 2006)

With Denise Jannah

- A Heart Full of Music (Timeless, 1993)

With Rick Margitza

- Hands of Time (Challenge, 1994)
- Game of Chance (Challenge, 1996)

With Enrico Pieranunzi

- Daedalus' Wings (Challenge, 1999)

With Clark Terry

- Shades of Blue (Challenge, 1994)

With Jasper van 't Hof

- Tomorrowland (Challenge, 1996)
- Un Mondo Illusorio (Challenge, 1998)
- Un Incontro Illusorio (Challenge, 2000) with Joey Baron

With Eric Vloeimans

- First Floor (Challenge, 1994)
- Bestarium (Challenge, 1996)
- Bitches and Fairy Tales (Challenge, 1998)
- Umai (Challenge, 2000)
- Hidden History (Challenge, 2002)
- Fujimundi (Challenge, 2003)
- Summersault (Challenge, 2005)
- Gatecrashin' (Challenge, 2006)
- Hyper (Challenge, 2006)
- Heavens Above! (Challenge, 2008)
- Live at Yoshi's (Challenge, 2008)
