= Catch Me! (Joe Pass album) =

Studio album by Joe Pass
- Released: July 1963
- Recorded: July 1963
- Studio: Pacific Jazz Studios, Hollywood
- Genre: Jazz
- Label: Pacific Jazz
- Producer: Richard Bock

Joe Pass chronology
Sounds of Synanon (1962)	Catch Me! (1963)	Joy Spring (1964)

Professional ratings
Review scores
Source	Rating
DownBeat	4/5 stars
AllMusic	4.5/5 stars
The Rolling Stone Jazz Record Guide	5/5 stars

Catch Me! is an album by jazz guitarist Joe Pass that was released in 1963.

== Track listing ==
No.	Title	Writer(s)	Length
1.	"Catch Me"	Pass
2.	"No Cover, No Minimum"	Bill Evans
3.	"Just Friends"	John Klenner, Sam M. Lewis
4.	"Walkin' Up"	Bill Evans
5.	"Summertime"	George Gershwin, Ira Gershwin, DuBose Heyward
6.	"Falling in Love with Love"	Richard Rodgers, Lorenz Hart
7.	"Days of Wine and Roses"	Henry Mancini, Johnny Mercer
8.	"Mood Indigo"	Duke Ellington, Irving Mills, Barney Bigard
9.	"But Beautiful"	Johnny Burke, Jimmy Van Heusen
10.	"You Stepped Out of a Dream"	Nacio Herb Brown, Gus Kahn

== Personnel ==
- Joe Pass – guitar
- Clare Fischer – piano, organ
- Ralph Peña – double bass
- Albert Stinson – double bass
- Colin Bailey – drums
- Larry Bunker – drums
