= Victim of Love =

Victim of Love may refer to:

== Music ==
- Victim of Love (Elton John album), 1979, or the title song
- Victim of Love (Charles Bradley album), 2013
- Victim of Love (Dee Dee Bridgewater album), 1989
- "Victim of Love" (Erasure song), 1987
- "Victim of Love" (The Cars song), 1982
- "Victim of Love" (Eagles song), 1977
- "Victim of Love", a song by Sweet Sensation from Take It While It's Hot album
- "Victim of Love", a song by Bryan Adams from Into the Fire
- "Victim of Love", a song by Cash Cash from Love or Lust

== Other media ==
- Victim of Love (1923 film), a silent German film
- Victim of Love (1991 film), a psychological thriller starring Pierce Brosnan
- Victim of Love: The Shannon Mohr Story, a 1993 TV movie featuring Andrea Parker
- Victim of Love (novel), a 1982 novel by Dyan Sheldon

== See also ==
- "Victims of Love", a song by Joe Lamont from Secrets You Keep
- "Victims of Love", a song by Good Charlotte from Good Morning Revival
