= In Montreux =

Live album by Dee Dee Bridgewater
- Released: 1990
- Recorded: July 18, 1990
- Venue: Casino de Montreux, Montreux, Switzerland
- Genre: Jazz
- Length: 49:54
- Label: Polydor 847 913-2
- Producer: Jean-Pierre Grosz

Dee Dee Bridgewater chronology
Victim of Love (1989)	In Montreux (1990)	Keeping Tradition (1993)

In Montreux is a live album by American jazz singer Dee Dee Bridgewater. The album was digitally recorded on July 18, 1990, at the Casino de Montreux during the Montreux Jazz Festival and released via Polydor Records.

== Critical reception ==
Professional ratings
Review scores
Source	Rating
AllMusic	4/5 stars
The Buffalo News	3/4 stars
The Penguin Guide to Jazz	3/4 stars
The Rolling Stone Jazz & Blues Album Guide	3.5/5 stars
The Virgin Encyclopedia of Jazz	3/5 stars
USA Today	4/5 stars
Tom Hull	B

Scott Yanow of AllMusic noted, "Dee Dee Bridgewater's move to France awhile back has resulted in her having a relatively low profile in jazz. This excellent live set should help restore her reputation... Bridgewater (who is backed by a French rhythm section) is in top form, singing with swing and sensitivity."

Jeff Simon of The Buffalo News declared, "...Bridgewater has enough joy, energy and authenticity to capture the stoniest heart and heaviest foot."

James T. Jones IV of USA Today favourably found, "Recorded live, this collection of standards features jazz singing par excellence. Fronting a fiery trio, Bridgewater scats and improvises with the aggression of a saxophonist. The audience is brought to near-hysteria as she attacks each song, spontaneously rewriting melodies."

== Track listing ==
No.	Title	Writer(s)	Length
1.	"All of Me"	Gerald Marks, Seymour Simons	7:51
2.	"How Insensitive (Insensatez)"	Antônio Carlos Jobim, Vinícius de Moraes	7:51
3.	"Just Friends"	John Klenner, Sam M. Lewis	7:51
4.	"A Child Is Born"	Thad Jones	4:35
5.	"Strange Fruit"	Lewis Allan	5:12
6.	"A Night in Tunisia"	Dizzy Gillespie, Frank Paparelli	9:16
7.	"Horace Silver Medley: Sister Sadie/Next Time I Fall in Love/Señor Blu"	Ronald Bright, Horace Silver	7:18
Total length:			49:54

== Personnel ==
Band

- Dee Dee Bridgewater – vocals
- Bert van den Brink – piano
- Hein van de Geyn – bass, arrangements
- André Ceccarelli – drums

Production

- Jean-Pierre Grosz – executive producer
- Justin Shirley-Smith – recording
- Pierre Jacquot – recording
- Bruno Lambert – mixing
- Alain Frappier – art direction

== Original release history ==
Release history and formats for In Montreux
Region	Date	Format	Label	Ref.
North America	1990	LP; CD; cassette	Polydor Records	
