= Coffy (soundtrack) =

Soundtrack album by Roy Ayers
- Released: May 1973
- Recorded: April 5, 1973 – April 8, 1973
- Studio: Sound Ideas, New York City, New York, US
- Genre: Jazz-funk
- Length: 36:03
- Label: Polydor PD-5048
- Producer: Roy Ayers

Roy Ayers chronology
Red, Black and Green (1973)	Coffy (1973)	Virgo Red (1973)

Professional ratings
Review scores
Source	Rating
AllMusic	4.5/5 stars

Coffy is a soundtrack produced, composed, and arranged by Roy Ayers for the blaxploitation film Coffy. It was released in 1973 on Polydor Records and peaked at number 31 on the jazz albums chart.

== Track listing ==
All songs written by Roy Ayers, except by "End of Sugarman" Ayers and Harry Whitaker. Lyrics to "Coffy Is the Color", "King George" and "Shining Symbol" written by Carl Clay; lyrics to "Coffy Baby" written by Roselle Weaver.

No.	Title	Vocals	Length
1.	"Coffy Is the Color"	Dee Dee Bridgewater, Roy Ayers, Wayne Garfield	3:03
2.	"Priscilla's Theme"		3:58
3.	"King George"	Roy Ayers	3:00
4.	"Aragon"		2:55
5.	"Coffy Sauna"		2:16
6.	"King's Last Ride"		1:10
7.	"Coffy Baby"	Dee Dee Bridgewater	2:26
8.	"Brawling Broads"		2:46
9.	"Escape"		2:18
10.	"Shining Symbol"	Wayne Garfield	3:53
11.	"Exotic Dance"		3:18
12.	"Making Love"		2:49
13.	"Vittroni's Theme – King Is Dead"		2:03
14.	"End of Sugarman"		1:05
Total length:			36:03

== Personnel ==
Music score composed, arranged and conducted by Roy Ayers; orchestrations by Harry Whitaker.

- Harry Whitaker - Electric piano, organ, harpsichord, piano
- Billy Nichols, Bob Rose - Guitar
- Richard Davis - Acoustic and electric bass
- Dennis Davis - Drums
- William King - Bongos, congas, percussion
- Cecil Bridgewater - Trumpet, flugelhorn
- Jon Faddis - Trumpet, flugelhorn
- Wayne Andre, Garnett Brown - Trombone
- Peter Dimitriades, Harry Lookofsky, Irving Spice, Emanuel Vardi - Strings
- Denise "Dee Dee" Bridgewater - Vocals on "Coffy Is the Color" and "Coffy Baby"
- Wayne Garfield- Vocals on "Coffy Is the Color" and "Shining Symbol"
- Roy Ayers - Vibraphone, vocals on "Coffy Is the Color" and "King George"

== Charts ==
Chart (1973)	Peak positions
Billboard Jazz LPs	31
