= For Django =

Studio album by Joe Pass
- Released: October 1964
- Recorded: October 1964
- Studio: Pacific Jazz Studios, Hollywood
- Genre: Jazz
- Length: 32:17
- Label: Pacific
- Producer: Richard Bock

Joe Pass chronology
| Joy Spring (1964) | For Django (1964) | A Sign of the Times (1965) |

For Django is an album by jazz guitarist Joe Pass that contains renditions of compositions famously interpreted by, written about or written for Django Reinhardt.

== Reception ==
Professional ratings
Review scores
| Source | Rating |
|---|---|
| Allmusic | 4.5/5 stars |
| The Rolling Stone Jazz Record Guide | 3/5 stars |

In his Allmusic review, critic Scott Yanow wrote that the album was long considered a classic and that "Although Pass was actually more strongly influenced by Charlie Christian than by Reinhardt and he had already formed his own style, he has no difficulty fitting into the music."

== Track listing ==
1. "Django" (John Lewis) – 3:22
2. "Rosetta" (Earl Hines, Henri Woode) – 3:07
3. "Nuages" (Django Reinhardt, Jacques Larue) – 2:35
4. "For Django" (Pass) – 2:55
5. "Night and Day" (Cole Porter) – 3:46
6. "Fleur d'Ennui" (Reinhardt) – 2:57
7. "Insensiblement" (Paul Misraki) – 3:14
8. "Cavalerie" (Reinhardt) – 4:26
9. "Django's Castle" (Reinhardt) – 3:49
10. "Limehouse Blues" (Douglas Furber, Philip Braham) – 2:14

== Personnel ==
- Joe Pass – guitar
- John Pisano – guitar
- Jim Hughart – bass
- Colin Bailey – drums

== Charts ==
Chart performance for For Django
| Chart (2022) | Peak position |
|---|---|
| German Albums (Offizielle Top 100) | 38 |
