= Cavalerie =

1937 music composition by Django Reinhardt

Cavalerie is a 1937 composition by jazz guitarist Django Reinhardt. Reinhardt attempted to record it with the Quintet of the Hot Club of France but aborted the attempt and the original version of the piece is now lost. It was later re-recorded and released as a single by him in 1943 with "Douce Ambiance". He recorded it on the 17 February 1943 in Paris. Joe Pass recorded the piece for his 1964 album For Django. The Pass version is a bebop-inspired swinging altered blues composition in the key of D♭ major, featuring a thumping bass at the beginning and D 9th and D♭ 9th alternations. Much of the track is blues over D♭ 7th and G♭ 7th.
