= Mood Indigo =

Jazz composition by Duke Ellington

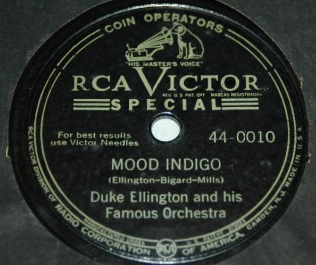

Song by Duke Ellington and His Famous Orchestra
- Published: 1930 by Mills Music
- Genre: Jazz
- Label: RCA Victor
- Composers: Duke Ellington, Barney Bigard
- Lyricist: Irving Mills

"Mood Indigo" is a jazz song with music by Duke Ellington and Barney Bigard and lyrics by Irving Mills.

== Composition ==
Although Irving Mills—Jack Mills's brother and publishing partner—took credit for the lyrics, Mitchell Parish claimed in a 1987 interview that he had written the lyrics.

The tune was composed for a radio broadcast in October 1930 and was originally titled "Dreamy Blues". It was "the first tune I ever wrote specially for microphone transmission", Ellington recalled. "The next day wads of mail came in raving about the new tune, so Irving Mills put a lyric to it." Renamed "Mood Indigo", it became a jazz standard.

The main theme was provided by Bigard, who learned it in New Orleans, Louisiana from his clarinet teacher Lorenzo Tio, who called it a "Mexican Blues". Ellington's arrangement was first recorded by his band for Brunswick on October 17, 1930. It was recorded twice more in 1930. These recordings included Arthur Whetsel (trumpet), Tricky Sam Nanton (trombone), Barney Bigard (clarinet), Duke Ellington (piano), Fred Guy (banjo), Wellman Braud (bass), Sonny Greer (drums). Ellington blended muted trumpet, muted trombone, and clarinet.

Ellington took the traditional front-line—trumpet, trombone, and clarinet—and inverted them. At the time of these first three recordings in 1930, the usual voicing of the horns would be clarinet at the top (highest pitch), trumpet in the middle, and the trombone at the bottom (lowest pitch). In "Mood Indigo" Ellington voices the trombone right at the top of the instrument's register, and the clarinet at the very lowest. This was unheard of at the time, and also created (in the studio) a so-called "mic tone"—an effect generated by the overtones of the clarinet and trombone (which was tightly muted as well). The "mic tone" gives the audio-illusion of the presence of a fourth "voice" or instrument. Ellington used this effect in "(In My) Solitude" (1932), "Dusk" (1940), and many other pieces throughout his career. The Ellington band performed and recorded the song continuously throughout its 50 years, both in its original form and as a vehicle for individual soloists.

In 1975, the 1931 release of "Mood Indigo" by Duke Ellington on Brunswick Records was inducted into the Grammy Hall of Fame.

== Other versions ==
- Duke Ellington – 1930
- Lee Morse - 1932
- The Boswell Sisters - 1933
- Jimmie Lunceford – 1934
- Paul Robeson - 1937
- Duke Ellington – Masterpieces by Ellington (1950)
- In 1954, the Norman Petty Trio had a hit with the song, which reached No. 14 on the pop charts.
- The Four Freshmen– 1954
- Frank Sinatra - In The Wee Small Hours (1955)
- Thelonious Monk – Thelonious Monk Plays Duke Ellington (Riverside 1955)
- Nina Simone – Little Girl Blue (1959)
- Charles Mingus – Mingus Dynasty (Columbia 1960) & Mingus Mingus Mingus Mingus Mingus (Impulse! 1964)
- Linda Lawson – Introducing Linda Lawson (1960)
- Duke Ellington and Coleman Hawkins – Duke Ellington Meets Coleman Hawkins (Impulse! 1962)
- Clark Terry and Bob Brookmeyer with Hank Jones – Gingerbread Men (Mainstream 1966)
- Mina (arr. Gianni Ferrio) – Plurale (1976)
- Yukihiro Takahashi – Saravah! (1978)
- The Singers Unlimited (arr. Clare Fischer; voc arr. Gene Puerling) – A Special Blend (1980)
- Marcus Roberts – Alone with Three Giants (1990)
- Dave Grusin – Homage to Duke (1993)
- Dee Dee Bridgewater (arr. Clare Fischer) – Prelude to a Kiss: The Duke Ellington Album (1996)
- Mulgrew Miller and Niels-Henning Ørsted Pedersen – The Duets (1999)
- Joe Jackson – The Duke (2012)
- Annie Lennox – Nostalgia (2014)
- Dee Dee Bridgewater and Bill Charlap – Elemental (2025)

== Film appearances ==
"Mood Indigo" is featured in the films Bait (1954); The Continental Twist (1961); Paris Blues (1961); All Night Long (1962); Julia (1977); Rough Cut (1980); Renacer (1981); Frances (1982); The Cotton Club (1984); The Untouchables (1987); Harlem Nights (1989); The White Countess (2005); White Men Can't Jump (1992); Curtain Call (1999); Pitch People (1999); The Legend of Bagger Vance (2000); Divine Secrets of the Ya-Ya Sisterhood (2002); Hart's War (2002); Up In the Air (2009); and Keep On Keepin' On (2014).

It can also be heard in the TV movie Relentless: Mind of a Killer (1993); in the miniseries Come In Spinner (1990) and Mildred Pierce (2011); and in episodes from two HBO series created by David Chase: "Walk Like a Man" from The Sopranos (1999–2007) and "El Dorado," the series finale of Boardwalk Empire (2011–2014).

== See also ==
- List of 1930s jazz standards
