= Ramata Diakité =

Malian musician

Ramata "Rah" Diakité (Madina Diansa, Wassoulou, 1976 - Burkina Faso October 30, 2009) was a Malian Wassoulou musician. She was the cousin of Tata Diakité, who also died young.

== Life and origins ==
Ramata was born in 1976. Although Ramata did not come from a family of traditional musicians, when she was about twelve, Ramata started humming to herself in secret, accompanying herself on a gourd. In Wassoulou (and other areas of Mali), music is usually created by those of a certain caste (jeli/griot), and it can be controversial for artists outside of these castes to perform. Salif Keita is likely the most prominent example of a non-musical-caste performer to confront and conquer adversity relating to these cultural restrictions.

Ramata's aunt, Djénéba Diakité, asked her to sing backing vocals on a cassette, which was the start of her musical career, even though Ramata's parents frowned on the idea. As a backing vocalist, Ramata's vocal potential was quickly spotted, and she gained concert experience thanks to trips to France and throughout Africa.

She was soon called upon as a vocalist by many artists and arrangers, notably Samba Diallo, Yoro Diallo, and Tenin Sidibé.

In December 1995 she recorded her first cassette, Artistes, a bestseller in Mali in 1996. She gave many concerts and took part, along with Salif Keita, in a Mali evening at the Cité de la Musique in Paris in October 1997.

Ramata died on October 30, 2009, in Burkina Faso of complications related to a year-long battle with Hepatitis A.

== Music ==
Ramata has performed with Salif Keita, Taj Mahal, Toumani Diabaté, Dee Dee Bridgewater, Ben Harper, and others.

== Discography ==
- 2008: Burutumu (to be released)
- 2006: Maban
- 2004: I Dansé mady
- 2003: Djonya
- 2000: Confirmation
- 1998: Na
- 1995: Artistes

== Prizes and awards ==
- 2006: Tamana d'Or, Top Musician in Mali (co-winner with Salif Keita)
