= Midnight Sun (Dee Dee Bridgewater album) =

Compilation album by Dee Dee Bridgewater
- Released: August 26, 2011
- Genre: Jazz
- Length: 56:40
- Label: Decca/EmArcy
- Producer: Tulani Bridgewater Kowalski, Dee Dee Bridgewater

Dee Dee Bridgewater chronology
| Eleanora Fagan (1915-1959) (2010) | Midnight Sun (2011) | Dee Dee's Feathers (2015) |

Professional ratings
Review scores
| Source | Rating |
|---|---|
| Allmusic | 3.5/5 stars |
| Jazz Forum | 4.5/5 stars |
| Jazzwise | 4/5 stars |

Midnight Sun is a 2011 compilation album by American jazz singer Dee Dee Bridgewater.

== Background ==
The album is a collection of 11 love ballads and standards. Bridgewater explained "For years my fans and family have been asking me to compile a CD of my favorite love songs, and Midnight Sun is my ode to them. Love in all its glory – for better or for worse – as expressed by some of the most amazing songwriters of our time."

== Reception ==
Thom Jurek of Allmusic wrote "Midnight Sun, issued by Decca/Emarcy, is a ballads collection of jazz and pop standards assembled from Dee Dee Bridgewater's recordings for Verve and other UMG-associated labels... As an album, these tracks -- all beautifully remastered -- hold together very well despite the variety of instrumental settings, and Bridgewater imbues them all with her consummate phrasing and intimacy."

== Track listing ==
| No. | Title | Writer(s) | Length |
|---|---|---|---|
| 1. | "Midnight Sun" | Sonny Burke, Lionel Hampton, Johnny Mercer | 7:24 |
| 2. | "Angel Eyes" | Earl Brent, Matt Dennis | 5:51 |
| 3. | "My Ship" | Ira Gershwin, Kurt Weill | 4:57 |
| 4. | "Que Rest-t-il?" | Charles Trénet, Lee Wilson | 4:58 |
| 5. | "Lonely Woman" | Horace Silver | 5:21 |
| 6. | "Speak Low" | Ogden Nash, Kurt Weill | 4:18 |
| 7. | "I'm a Fool to Want You / I Fall in Love Too Easily" | Sammy Cahn, Joel Herron, Frank Sinatra, Jule Stein, Jack Wolf | 4:09 |
| 8. | "L' Hymne à L'amour" | Marguerite Monnot, Édith Piaf, Lee Wilson | 5:04 |
| 9. | "The Island" | Alan Bergman, Marilyn Bergman, Ivan Lins, Vítor Martins | 3:42 |
| 10. | "Good Morning Heartache" | Ervin Drake, Dan Fisher, Irene Higginbotham, Billie Holiday | 5:11 |
| 11. | "Here I'll Stay" | Alan Jay Lerner, Kurt Weill | 5:45 |
| Total length: | | | 56:40 |

== Chart positions ==
| Chart (2011) | Peak position |
|---|---|
| US Jazz Albums (Billboard 200) | 20 |

== Release history ==
Release history and formats for Midnight Sun
| Region | Date | Format | Label | Ref. |
|---|---|---|---|---|
| Various | August 26, 2011 | CD; digital | Decca Records/EmArcy Records | |
