= Relaxin' at Camarillo =

1947 jazz composition by Charlie Parker

"Relaxin' at Camarillo" is a composition by jazz saxophonist Charlie Parker. It is inspired by his six-month stay in Camarillo State Hospital in Ventura County, California, after serving a prison term for arson and resisting arrest. The tune is a blues in C major and has become a jazz standard.

== Background ==
The title "Relaxin' at Camarillo" was a reference to Parker's stay in Camarillo State Hospital in Ventura County, California, a mental health inpatient facility. He had been sent there to recuperate from alcohol and drug addiction after he was briefly jailed for setting fire to his Los Angeles hotel room bed sheets and running naked through the hotel lobby while intoxicated. According to musicologist and Parker scholar Henry Martin, Parker wanted to call the tune "Past Due", and was not happy with the title assigned by Dial Records that referenced the difficult episode in his life:

The title of the piece was apparently Ross Russell’s and refers to Parker’s recuperation at Camarillo State Hospital from July 1946 through January 1947. Parker himself wanted to call the piece “Past Due” but was apparently overruled by Russell. In several Bird Flight broadcasts, Phil Schaap has suggested that Russell may have insisted on the title in analogy to a recording by Muggsy Spanier called “Relaxin’ at the Touro” (Spanier-Bushkin, 1939), which referred to [Spanier's] recovery from alcoholism at a hospital in New Orleans.

== Recordings ==
After release, Parker was able to record it along with three originals by trumpeter Howard McGhee: "Cheers", "Stupendous" and "Carvin the Bird". Parker recorded the tune with McGhee on trumpet, Dodo Marmarosa on piano, Wardell Gray on tenor, Barney Kessell on guitar, Red Callender on bass and Don Lamond on drums. The tune was originally recorded in C major, and has become a jazz standard. Ted Gioia, commenting in West Coast Jazz: Modern Jazz in California, 1945-1960, has referred to the original recording as a "sinuous blues", a 12-bar blues that is a "further testimony to the subtlety of Parker's rhythmic phrasing". Gioia considers it to have been one of the finest recordings Parker made in California. Roy Porter and David Keller consider "Relaxin' at Camarillo" to be a "great bop classic".

Guitarist Joe Pass recorded it in 1964 for his album Joy Spring. Saxophonist Joe Henderson released an album of the same name, featuring the recording, in 1979. It was later recorded by pianist Cedar Walton. Jazz Journal International stated in 2009 that Walton "provides a stimulating introduction to Parker's Relaxin' At Camarillo. Cedar's solo here is one of his best on a disc that is chock full of glowing solos."
