= Sounds of Synanon =

Live album by Joe Pass
- Released: July 1, 1962
- Studio: Pacific Jazz Studios, Hollywood
- Genre: Jazz
- Length: 42:11
- Label: Pacific Jazz
- Producer: Richard Bock

Joe Pass chronology
Sounds of Synanon (1962)	Catch Me! (1963)

Professional ratings
Review scores
Source	Rating
DownBeat	4.5/5 stars
Allmusic	4.5/5 stars

Sounds of Synanon is the debut album by jazz guitarist Joe Pass.

== Background and recording ==
The album was recorded with patients at the Synanon Drug Center, where Pass was being treated for addiction to heroin. Pass did not own his own guitar at the time of the album's recording, and recorded using a borrowed electric solid-body guitar.

== Release ==
The album was reissued in 2022, accompanied by seven bonus tracks.

== Reception ==
Jazz critic Leonard Feather reviewed the album for the July 5, 1962 issue of DownBeat magazine and said, "This album does more than merely present a group of good musicians, it unveils a star. In Joe Pass, Synanon and Pacific Jazz have discovered a major jazz talent..."

Robert Taylor of AllMusic highlighted the tunes "Projections" and "Hang Tough" as some of the tightest and "cleanest" playing of Pass's entire career. Taylor concluded his retrospective review of the album by stating, "his accompanists prove to be adequate, but hardly approach the genius of Pass. A landmark recording in the history of jazz guitar."

== Track listing ==
No.	Title	Writer(s)	Length
1.	"C.E.D."	Joe Pass, Arnold Ross	3:14
2.	"Aaron's Song"	Dave Allen	4:31
3.	"Stay Loose"	Arnold Ross	4:22
4.	"Projections"	Greg Dykes	5:10
5.	"Hang Tough"	Pass	6:30
6.	"Self-Image"	Dave Allen	9:06
7.	"Last Call for Coffee"	Arnold Ross	4:43
8.	"Blues"		4:36

== Personnel ==
- Joe Pass – electric guitar
- Dave Allen – trumpet
- Greg Dykes – baritone horn
- Arnold Ross – piano
- Ronald Clark – bass
- Bill Crawford – drums
