= Joy Spring (Joe Pass album) =

Live album by Joe Pass
- Released: 1981
- Recorded: February 6, 1964
- Venue: Encore Theater, Los Angeles
- Genre: Jazz
- Length: 41:12
- Label: Pacific Jazz
- Producer: Richard Bock

Joe Pass chronology
| Catch Me! (1963) | Joy Spring (1981) | For Django (1964) |

Joy Spring is a live album by jazz guitarist Joe Pass that was recorded in 1964 for Pacific Jazz Records, but not released until 1981 under the Blue Note label by Liberty records.

== Reception ==
Professional ratings
Review scores
| Source | Rating |
|---|---|
| Allmusic | 4/5 stars |
| The Rolling Stone Jazz Record Guide | 3/5 stars |
| The Penguin Guide to Jazz Recordings | 3/4 stars |

Writing for Allmusic, music critic Scott Yanow wrote of the album, "The group stretches out on five standards (the renditions are 6 1/2-10 1/2 minutes apiece) but never runs out of inventive ideas. Easily recommended."

== Track listing ==
1. "Joy Spring" (Clifford Brown) – 8:39
2. "Sometime Ago" (Sergio Mihanovich) – 6:34
3. "The Night Has a Thousand Eyes" (Buddy Bernier, Jerry Brainin) – 6:58
4. "Relaxin' at Camarillo" (Charlie Parker) – 10:29
5. "There Is No Greater Love" (Isham Jones, Marty Symes) – 9:02

== Personnel ==
- Joe Pass – guitar
- Mike Wofford – piano
- Jim Hughart – bass
- Colin Bailey – drums
