= Red Earth (Dee Dee Bridgewater album) =

Studio album by Dee Dee Bridgewater
- Released: April 17, 2007
- Recorded: August 24–27, 2006; November 1–7, 2006
- Studio: Studio Bogolan, Bamako, Mali; Studio Davout, Paris, France
- Genre: Jazz, Vocal, Fusion, Malinese Music/wassoulou
- Length: 69:40
- Label: DDB Records / EmArcy / Universal
- Producer: Dee Dee Bridgewater, Jean Marie Durand, Cheick Tidiane Seck

Dee Dee Bridgewater chronology
J'ai deux amours (2005)	Red Earth (2007)	Eleanora Fagan (1915-1959) (2009)

Professional ratings
Review scores
Source	Rating
All About Jazz	4.5/5 stars
Allmusic	4.5/5 stars
The Buffalo News	3.5/4 stars
The Guardian	4/5 stars
laut.de	5/5 stars
Now	5/5 Ns
The Observer	4/5 stars
PopMatters	9/10
Tom Hull	B+

Red Earth is a 2007 studio album by Dee Dee Bridgewater. It carries the subtitle "A Malian Journey" to celebrate and explore her African and Malian ancestry. The album brought her the seventh nomination for Best Jazz Vocal Album at the 2008 Grammy Awards. On Billboard's Top Jazz Album chart it reached Number 16.

== Reception ==
John L. Walters of The Guardian stated "After a few underwhelming "crossover" projects, US singer Dee Dee Bridgewater has made a cracking album that unites great jazz singing with the Malian griot tradition. Red Earth is neither fusion nor compromise but a happy meeting of African musicianship and Afro-American romanticism. Mostly recorded in Bamako, it includes several Malian songs: a sparkling version of Kassé Mady Diabaté's Bad Spirits (Bani), featuring Toumani Diabaté, and a joyous duet with Ramata Diakité on the latter's Mama Don't Ever Go Away (Mama Digna Sara Ye). Bridgewater makes a point of incorporating music and performances by several fine women singers and writers: Oumou Sangare, Mamani Keita, Fatamata "Mama" Kouyaté (on the bluesy title track) and Tata Kouyaté on Bambo (No More), her famous protest against forced marriage. An amazing cast of Malian musicians make classics such as Afro Blue and Long Time Ago (Wayne Shorter's Footprints with lyrics) sound reborn, giving Nina Simone's Four Women new depth and power. Wonderful."

== Track listing ==
All compositions by Dee Dee Bridgewater, except as noted.

1. "Afro Blue" (Mongo Santamaría, Oscar Brown, Jr.) – 5:11
2. "Bad Spirits" – 5:49
3. "Dee Dee" (Baba Sissoko, Bridgewater) – 2:57
4. "Mama Don't Ever Go Away" – 5:39
5. "Long Time Ago" (Wayne Shorter, Bridgewater) – 6:48
6. "Children Go 'Round" – 6:05
7. "The Griots" – 6:04
8. "Oh My Love" – 6:03
9. "Four Women" (Nina Simone) – 5:24
10. "No More" – 4:45
11. "Red Earth" – 5:17
12. "Meanwhile" (Edsel Gomez, Bridgewater) – 4:25
13. "Compared to What" (Gene McDaniels, Lassy "King" Massassy) – 5:21

All tracks recorded in Bamako (Mali) at Studio Bogolan except tracks 11, 12 and 13 recorded in Paris at Davout studios.

== Personnel ==
- Dee Dee Bridgewater - Vocals
- Edsel Gomez - Piano
- Ira Coleman - Bass
- Minino Garay - Drums, percussion, background vocals

plus alternating line-ups with

- Cheick Tidiane Seck - Fender Rhodes, Hammond organ, shakeres, calebasse, karignan, background vocals
- Ramata Diakité - Vocals (track 4)
- Mamani Keïta - Vocals (3), background vocals
- Fatoumata "Mama" Kouyaté - Vocals (11), background vocals
- Kabiné Kouyaté - Vocals (7), background vocals
- Tata "Bambo" Kouyaté - Vocals (10)
- Amy Sacko - Vocals (6), background vocals
- Oumou Sangaré - Vocals (8)
- Lassy "King" Massassy - Rap vocals (13)
- Fatou - background vocals
- Baba Sissoko - Balafon, ngoni, tamani and vocals (3)
- Lansiné Kouyaté - Balafon
- Habib "Dia" Sangaré - Bolon
- Alou Kouloubali - Calebasse
- "Petit" Adama Diarra - Djembe
- Cheick "Sékou" Oumar - Djembe
- Djifli Mamadou Sanogo - Djembe
- Moussa Sissikho - Djembe (soloist)
- Maré Sanogo - Doum-doum
- Lamine Tounkara - Doum-doum
- Aly Wagué - Flute (5, 9)
- Gabriel Durand - Guitar
- Modibo Kouyaté - Guitar
- Jacob Soubeiga - Guitar
- Djelimady Tounkara - Guitar (soloist)
- Mamadou Diabaté - Kora
- Cherif Samano - Kora
- Yakhoba Sissokho - Kora (soloist)
- Benogo Diakité - Kamale ngoni (soloist)
- Moriba Koïta - Ngoni (soloist)
- Bassekou Kouyaté - Ngoni (soloist)
- Adama Tounkara - Ngoni
- "Pepito" Sekouba Kouyaté - Tama
- Moussa Sissoko - Tama

== Chart positions ==
Chart (2007)	Peak position
Belgian Albums (Ultratop Flanders)	93
French Albums (SNEP)	53
Swiss Albums (Schweizer Hitparade)	86
US Jazz Albums (Billboard)	16

== Release history ==
Release history and formats for Red Earth
Region	Date	Format	Label	Ref.
Various	April 17, 2007	CD; digital	DDB Records	
