= Dee Dee Bridgewater (1976 album) =

Studio album by Dee Dee Bridgewater
- Released: 1976
- Recorded: 1976
- Studio: Muscle Shoals Sound Studios, Sheffield, AL; Sound Factory, Los Angeles, CA; Soundtek, New York, NY
- Genre: Jazz
- Length: 36:05
- Label: Atlantic
- Producer: Gene Page, Stephen Y. Scheaffer, Jerry Wexler

Dee Dee Bridgewater chronology
Afro Blue (1974)	Dee Dee Bridgewater (1976)	Just Family (1977)

Dee Dee Bridgewater is the second studio album by American jazz singer Dee Dee Bridgewater. The record was released in 1976 via Atlantic Records label. She also released a self-titled album in 1980 via the Elektra label.

== Critical reception ==
Professional ratings
Review scores
Source	Rating
AllMusic	3/5 stars
The Penguin Guide to Jazz	2.5/4 stars
The Rolling Stone Record Guide	2/5 stars
Tom Hull	B

Stacia Proefrock of AllMusic wrote "Dee Dee Bridgewater's self-titled album opens with a song that sounds closer to Gloria Gaynor than Ella Fitzgerald, throwing her jazz fans for a loop. This 1976 release explores R&B and funk territories, while still employing her strong, husky voice. She shows the amazing range and emotional expression that would make her "comeback" albums of the '90s so remarkable, while apparently having a lot of fun. While this album is out of character for her stylistically, it is still a fine addition to any fan's collection."

== Track listing ==
No.	Title	Writer(s)	Length
1.	"My Prayer"	Georges Boulanger, Jimmy Kennedy	3:35
2.	"My Lonely Room"	Peter Skellern	4:52
3.	"It Ain't Easy"	Allen Toussaint	3:32
4.	"He's Gone"	Daryl Hall, John Oates	5:56
5.	"Goin' Through the Motions"	Tom Bahler	3:53
6.	"You Saved Me"	Bob Bateman, LiL' Ed	4:29
7.	"Every Man Wants Another Man's Woman"	Alan O'Day	4:09
8.	"My Prayer"	Georges Boulanger, Jimmy Kennedy	5:39
Total length:			36:05

== Personnel ==
Band

- Dee Dee Bridgewater – vocals
- Barry Beckett, Joe Sample, Tom Hensley – keyboards
- Harry Bluestone – concertmaster
- Herb Bushler, Henry Davis, Wilton Felder, David Hood – bass guitar
- Pete Carr, Jerry Friedman, Jimmy Johnson, Cliff Morris, Ray Parker Jr., Dean Parks, Melvin Ragin, David T. Walker – guitar
- Vivian Cherry – backing vocals
- Merry Clayton – backing vocals
- Gary Coleman – percussion
- Jim Gilstrap – backing vocals
- Ed Greene, Roger Hawkins – drums
- Loni Groves – backing vocals
- Bobbye Hall – congas
- Augie Johnson – backing vocals
- John Lehman – backing vocals
- Marti McCall – backing vocals
- Linda November – backing vocals
- Jackie Ward – backing vocals
- Carolyn Willia – backing vocals
- Harold Wheeler – horn arrangements, keyboards, string arrangements
- Gene Orloff – concertmaster

Production

- Bob Defrin – art direction
- Lewis Hahn – mixing
- Gregg Hamm – engineer
- David Hassinger – engineer
- Jerry Masters – engineer
- Steve Melton – engineer
- Billy Page – vocal arrangement
- Gene Page – arranger, producer
- Stephen Y. Scheaffer – mixing, producer
- Paula Scher – art direction
- Jon Vogel – mastering
- Jerry Wexler –producer

== Original release history ==
Release history and formats for Dee Dee Bridgewater
Region	Date	Format	Label	Ref.
North America	1976	LP; cassette	Atlantic Records	
