= Bad for Me (Dee Dee Bridgewater album) =

Studio album by Dee Dee Bridgewater
- Released: 1979
- Genre: Jazz
- Length: 37:05
- Label: Elektra
- Producer: George Duke

Dee Dee Bridgewater chronology
Just Family (1977)	Bad for Me (1979)	Dee Dee Bridgewater (1980)

Singles from Bad for Me
- 1. "Bad for Me" Released: 1979

Professional ratings
Review scores
Source	Rating
AllMusic	2/5 stars
Cashbox	(favourable)
The Encyclopedia of Popular Music	3/5 stars

Bad for Me is the fourth studio album by American jazz singer Dee Dee Bridgewater, released in 1979 by Elektra Records. The album reached at No. 29 on the Cashbox Top Jazz Albums chart and No. 30 on the Billboard Jazz Albums chart.

== Overview ==
Bad for Me was produced by George Duke. Artists such as Sheila E., Roland Bautista, Ricky Lawson, Alphonso Johnson and Larry Dunn appeared on the album.

== Singles ==
The title track was released as the only single and peaked at No. 37 on the Billboard Hot Soul Singles chart.

== Critical reception ==
Dayton Daily News critic Elton Alexander noted Bridgewater's shift from her earlier nightclub singing style to a more upbeat sound. He described the album as rhythmically engaging and highlighted tracks such as "Bad for Me", "Love Won’t Let Me Go," "Tequila Mockingbird," and "Is This What Feeling Gets?".

== Covers ==
Bridgewater covered Carole Bayer Sager's "It's the Falling in Love" on the album.

== Track listing ==
No.	Title	Writer(s)	Length
1.	"Bad for Me"	Deborah Thomas; Charles Veal Jr.	5:36
2.	"Back of Your Mind"	Eugene McDaniels; Raye Styles	3:18
3.	"For the Girls"	George Duke; Denise Eileen Garrett	4:47
4.	"Love Won't Let Me Go"	Denise Eileen Garrett	4:01
5.	"Streetsinger"	Don Kerr	3:35
6.	"It's the Falling in Love"	Carole Bayer Sager; David Foster	3:36
7.	"Tequila Mockingbird"	Larry Dunn; Roxanne Joy Seeman	4:03
8.	"Don't Say It (If You Don't Mean It)"	Bobby Lyle	4:13
9.	"Is This What Feelings Gets?"	Nickolas Ashford; Valerie Simpson; Quincy Jones	3:56
Total length:			37:05

== Personnel ==
- Dee Dee Bridgewater – lead vocals, backing vocals (on tracks 3, 6, 8)
- George Duke – Yamaha electric grand piano (1, 3), backing vocals (2), Fender Rhodes piano and synthesizer (9)
- Bobby Lyle – Fender Rhodes piano (2), Yamaha electric grand piano (5, 8), Minimoog and clavinet (8)
- Larry Dunn – Fender Rhodes piano (4, 7), Minimoog (7)
- Greg Phillinganes – Fender Rhodes piano (6)
- Roland Bautista – guitar (exc. 5, 9)
- Byron Miller – bass (1, 2, 4, 5, 7)
- Robert Matthew Powell – bass (3, 8)
- Alphonso Johnson – bass (6, 9)
- Ricky Lawson – drums
- Sheila Escovedo – percussion (1, 2, 5, 6, 8)
- Paulinho da Costa – percussion (7)
- Lawrence Williams – tenor saxophone (exc. 4, 7)
- Don Menza – tenor saxophone (1)
- Fred Jackson – baritone saxophone (4, 7)
- Jerry Hey – trumpet (exc. 2, 9), flugelhorn (2, 9)
- Bobby Bryant – trumpet (4, 7)
- Rahmlee Michael Davis – trumpet (4)
- Sidney Muldrow, Richard Perissi – French horn (4, 7)
- Napoleon Murphy Brock – trombone (2, 3), backing vocals (1, 2)
- Lew McCreary – trombone (1)
- George Bohanon, Louis Satterfield – trombone (4, 7)
- William Frank Reichenbach Jr. – trombone (5, 6, 8, 9)
- Maurice Spears – bass trombone (4, 7)
- Lynn Davis – backing vocals (1–4, 7, 8)
- Josie James – backing vocals (1, 3, 4, 7, 8)
- Jim Gilstrap – backing vocals (4, 7)
- Carolyn Dennis, Becky Lopez, Petsye Powell – backing vocals (5)
- George Duke – producer, arrangements and orchestrations (1–3, 5), conductor (9)
- Horn arrangements (8) – George Duke, Bobby Lyle
- For tracks 4 and 7
  - Vocal arrangements – George Duke, Larry Dunn
  - Horn arrangements – Eduardo Del Barrio, Larry Dunn (4 only)
  - Conductor of horn section – Eduardo Del Barrio
  - String arrangements and conductor of string section – George Del Barrio
- Gene McDaniels – Producer
- Songwriters "Back of Your Mind" Gene McDaniels, Raye Stiles

== Chart history ==
Chart (1979)	Peak position
US Cashbox Top Jazz Albums	29
US Billboard Jazz Albums	30
US Billboard Top Soul Albums	57

== Original release history ==
Release history and formats for Bad for Me
Region	Date	Format	Label	Ref.
North America	1979	LP	Elektra Records	
