= J'ai deux amours =

Studio album by Dee Dee Bridgewater
- Released: July 5, 2005
- Recorded: October 25 – November 4, 2004
- Studios: Studio Plus XXX, Paris, France
- Genre: Vocal jazz
- Length: 36:31
- Label: DDB Records
- Producers: Dee Dee Bridgewater, Jean Marie Durand

Dee Dee Bridgewater chronology
| This Is New (1998) | J'ai deux amours (2005) | Red Earth (2007) |

Professional ratings
Review scores
| Source | Rating |
|---|---|
| Allmusic | 3.5/5 stars |
| All About Jazz | 3/5 stars |
| The Buffalo News | 2/4 stars |
| The Penguin Guide to Jazz | 2.5/4 stars |
| PopMatters | 7/10 |

J'ai deux amours is an album by Dee Dee Bridgewater. This was Bridgewater's first album of French music; she lived in France for more than two decades and speaks French.

== Reception ==
Dave Gelly of The Guardian stated, "'J'ai deux amours' was the number with which Josephine Baker captivated Paris in 1929, and Dee Dee Bridgewater is her nearest equivalent today, a star both at home in the US and in her adopted country. Her singing is as expressive as ever, but what really caught my attention was the arrangements, a collaborative effort by the singer and her band. Harmonically sophisticated and at times fairly abstract, they quickly banish any idea of sentimental, Gallic wallow." Hrayr Attarian of All About Jazz wrote, "There's no denying that J'ai deux amours is light and fluffy and may possibly have sacrificed substance for form. But it is tasty and enjoyable, much like the cinnamon-sweet froth of a cappuccino can be, even before one gets to the strong bite of the coffee."

Jason MacNeil of AllMusic commented, "These Parisian café tunes bring out the best in this stellar jazz singer, particularly on the opening title track. Accompanied by accordion, which introduces the song, Dee Dee Bridgewater takes you from Paris down to the French Riviera with a warm, slightly island sound as she sings en français. And she has no problem creating her soothing jazz pipes regardless of language." The Buffalo News review stated, "Bridgewater still shows her skill at shaping a phrase, her ability to bring out the depths of every word. She sings in French with obvious relish. But I hope she doesn't forget her fans back home."

== Track listing ==
1. "J'ai deux amours" (Géo Koger, Henri Varna, John Murray, Barry Trivers, Vincent Scotto) – 4:23
2. "La Mer" (Beyond the Sea) (Jack Lawrence, Charles Trenet) – 3:29
3. "Ne me quitte pas" (Jacques Brel, Rod McKuen) – 5:48
4. "Mon Homme" (My Man) (Channing Pollock, Albert Willemetz, Maurice Yvain) – 4:44
5. "Et Maintenant" (Pierre Delanoë, Carl Sigman, Gilbert Bécaud) – 3:26
6. "Que reste-t-il de nos amours ?" (Charles Trenet) – 4:57
7. "Dansez sur moi" (Girl Talk) (Bobby Troup, Claude Nougaro, Neal Hefti) – 4:17
8. "La Belle Vie" (The Good Life) (Jean Broussolle, Sacha Distel, Jack Reardon) – 10:11
9. "Avec le temps" (Léo Ferré) – 4:52
10. "La Vie en rose" (Édith Piaf, Mack David, Louiguy) – 5:19
11. "Les Feuilles mortes" (Jacques Prévert, Johnny Mercer, Joseph Kosma) – 4:56

== Personnel ==
- Dee Dee Bridgewater – vocals
- Marc Berthoumieux – accordion
- Louis Winsberg – guitar
- Patrick Manougian – guitar on tracks 9 & 10
- Ira Coleman – double bass
- Minino Garay – drums, percussion

== Chart positions ==
| Chart (2005) | Peak position |
|---|---|
| Austrian Albums (Ö3 Austria) | 71 |
| Belgian Albums (Ultratop Flanders) | 54 |
| Belgian Albums (Ultratop Wallonia) | 76 |
| French Albums (SNEP) | 25 |
| Swiss Albums (Schweizer Hitparade) | 63 |
| US Jazz Albums (Billboard) | 37 |

== Release history ==
Release history and formats for J'ai deux amours
| Region | Date | Format | Label | Ref. |
|---|---|---|---|---|
| Various | July 5, 2005 | CD | DDB Records | |
