= Love and Peace: A Tribute to Horace Silver =

Studio album by Dee Dee Bridgewater
- Released: September 26, 1995
- Recorded: December 1994
- Studios: Plus XXX Studios, Paris
- Genre: Vocal jazz
- Length: 63:36
- Label: Verve
- Producer: Dee Dee Bridgewater

Dee Dee Bridgewater chronology
Keeping Tradition (1993)	Love and Peace: A Tribute to Horace Silver (1995)	Prelude to a Kiss: The Duke Ellington Album (1996)

Singles from Love and Peace: A Tribute to Horace Silver
- 1. "The Jody Grind" Released: 1995

Love and Peace: A Tribute to Horace Silver is a 1995 studio album by Dee Dee Bridgewater, recorded in tribute to Horace Silver on Verve Records. This album peaked at No. 13 on the US Billboard Traditional Jazz Albums chart.

== Background ==
The album features contributions by Silver himself, as well as by Jimmy Smith. Silver makes two guest appearances on this album, on "Nica's Dream" and "Song for My Father". Silver's contributions were recorded on December 1, 1994. Bridgewater's performance earned her a Grammy nomination for Best Jazz Vocal Album.

== Critical reception ==
Professional ratings
Review scores
Source	Rating
AllMusic	4.5/5 stars
The Encyclopedia of Popular Music	2/5 stars
The Penguin Guide to Jazz	4/4 stars
The Rolling Stone Jazz & Blues Album Guide	4/5 stars
The Virgin Encyclopedia of Jazz	2/5 stars
Tom Hull	A−

Scott Yanow of AllMusic wrote, "Bridgewater uplifts Silver's lyrics, proves to be in prime form, and swings up a storm."

Britt Robson of the Star Tribune wrote, "After a long series of cloying, lackluster and stylistically misguided records, Bridgewater has finally found the right vehicle - a tribute to pianist-composer Horace Silver - to showcase her piquant mix of sass and sophistication. Silver's soulful jazz melodies are perfectly suited to Bridgewater's playful but refined vocals. What truly elevates this CD are the inspired takes on such relatively obscure fare."

Ken Franckling of UPI named Love and Peace: A Tribute to Horace Silver as 1994's 4th best jazz album.

== Track listing ==
1. "Permit Me to Introduce You to Yourself" – 3:25
2. "Nica's Dream" – 5:14
3. "The Tokyo Blues" – 5:44
4. "Pretty Eyes" – 5:05
5. "St. Vitus Dance" – 2:40
6. "You Happened My Way" – 6:29
7. "Soulville" – 4:16
8. "Filthy McNasty" – 4:51
9. "Song for My Father" – 5:30
10. "Doodlin'" – 6:06
11. "Lonely Woman" – 5:21
12. "The Jody Grind" – 5:00
13. "Blowin' the Blues Away" – 3:55

All music and lyrics written by Horace Silver.

== Personnel ==
- Dee Dee Bridgewater - vocals
- Stéphane Belmondo - trumpet
- Lionel Belmondo - tenor saxophone, arrangement of "Permit Me ..."
- Thierry Eliez - piano (except "Nica's Dream" and "Song for My Father")
- Horace Silver - piano (on "Nica's Dream" and "Song for My Father")
- Jimmy Smith - Hammond B3 organ (on "Filthy McNasty" and "The Jody Grind")
- Hein van de Geyn - bass, arrangements
- André Ceccarelli - drums

== Chart positions ==
Chart (1995)	Peak position
US Jazz Albums (Billboard)	13

== Release history ==
Release history and formats for Love and Peace: A Tribute to Horace Silver
Region	Date	Format	Label	Ref.
Various	September 26, 1995	CD; cassette	Verve Records	
