= Elemental (Dee Dee Bridgewater and Bill Charlap album) =

Studio album by Dee Dee Bridgewater and Bill Charlap
- Released: June 13, 2025
- Recorded: February 2025
- Studio: Sear Sound (NYC)
- Genre: Jazz
- Length: 43:47
- Label: Mack Avenue MAC1214
- Producer: Dee Dee Bridgewater; Tulani Bridgewater-Kowalski

Dee Dee Bridgewater chronology
Memphis... Yes, I'm Ready (2017)	Elemental (2025)

Professional ratings
Review scores
Source	Rating
AllMusic	4/5 stars
Jazzwise	4/5 stars
Tom Hull	A−

Elemental is a collaborative studio album by American jazz singer Dee Dee Bridgewater and pianist Bill Charlap. The album was released on 13 June 2025 by Mack Avenue.

== Reception ==
Styart Nicholson of Jazzwise stated: "The synergy songstress and accompanist create, each pushing one another in different directions asking questions like ‘how are you going to handle this?’ means there is never a let up in creativity. It’s demanding stuff with no room for coasting, which makes this studio album a remarkably vibrant affair." Will Friedwald of The Wall Street Journal wrote: "On their new album, “Elemental,” singer Dee Dee Bridgewater and pianist Bill Charlap push interpretation to its limits, starting with some very familiar jazz standards. Rather than digging down into their chord changes and devising new melodies on top of them, as has come to be the common practice in the modern jazz era, they create variations on the tunes as originally written."

The album was nominated for 2026 Grammy Awards in Best Jazz Vocal Album category. The Arts Fuse included the album in its list of the best jazz albums of 2025.

== Track listing ==
No.	Title	Writer(s)	Length
1.	"Beginning to See the Light"	Duke Ellington, Don George, Johnny Hodges, Harry James	5:13
2.	"Mood Indigo"	Duke Ellington, Barney Bigard, Irving Mills	7:01
3.	"Honeysuckle Rose"	Thomas "Fats" Waller, Andy Razaf	3:58
4.	"Here's That Rainy Day"	Jimmy Van Heusen, Johnny Burke	5:40
5.	"Love for Sale"	Cole Porter	6:03
6.	"'S Wonderful"	George Gershwin, Ira Gershwin	2:40
7.	"In the Still of the Night"	Cole Porter	8:35
8.	"Caravan"	Juan Tizol, Duke Ellington	4:33
Total length:			43:47

== Personnel ==
Band

- Dee Dee Bridgewater – vocals, producing
- Bill Charlap – piano

Production

- Tulani Bridgewater-Kowalski – producer
- Timothy J. Zick – recording, mixing

== Release history ==
Release history and formats for Elemental
Region	Date	Format	Label	Ref.
Various	June 13, 2025	LP; CD; digital	Mack Avenue Records	
