= Prelude to a Kiss: The Duke Ellington Album =

Studio album by Dee Dee Bridgewater
- Released: October 8, 1996
- Recorded: February 3 & 8 and May 6 & 7, 1996
- Studio: Paramount (Los Angeles); Ocean Way (Hollywood); Hit Factory (New York); Sony (New York); Bass Hit (New York); Right Track (New York)
- Genre: Vocal jazz
- Length: 52:13
- Label: Philips 446 717–2
- Producer: Robert Sadin

Dee Dee Bridgewater chronology
Love and Peace: A Tribute to Horace Silver (1995)	Prelude to a Kiss: The Duke Ellington Album (1996)	Dear Ella (1997)

Prelude to a Kiss: The Duke Ellington Album is a studio album by American jazz singer Dee Dee Bridgewater, recorded in tribute to Duke Ellington. The album was released on October 8, 1996, by Philips Records label. The album title was borrowed from the Ellington's tune. The release contains 12 tracks, which include the pop sounds of the Hollywood Bowl Orchestra.

== Critical reception ==
Professional ratings
Review scores
Source	Rating
AllMusic	2.5/5 stars
The Encyclopedia of Popular Music	3/5 stars

Clive Davis of The Sunday Times praised the album, saying, "Prelude to a Kiss marks something of a return to form, even if Ellington enthusiasts will have reservations over the crossover flavour of the arrangements. Bridgewater possesses the rare gift of making just about anything swing; she is assisted by a collection of guest soloists headed by Bobby Watson and Wynton Marsalis."

Marcela Breton of JazzTimes wrote, "Do we really need another reworking of the Ellington oeuvre? Enough already. Ellington gets nearly as much attention as John F. Kennedy, Jr... I like Bridgewater’s vocals on "Caravan" and "Bli-Blip," and Bobby Watson’s alto sax on "Midnight Indigo."

Steve Jones of USA Today favourably found, "Some of the Duke's most beloved tunes and some of jazz's most exciting talents make for a dynamic combination. Bridgewater shows her versatility on six of the album's 12 songs including the title cut, Bli-Blip and Mood Indigo."

Ken Dryden of AllMusic noted, "But it is her hypnotic, chanting introduction, backed by Middle Eastern percussion and Steve Turre's conch shells, that gives this release an occasional freshness usually lacking in similar Ellington tributes."

Mike Joyce in his review for The Washington Post commented, "Duke Ellington's music has a calming effect on jazz vocalist Dee Dee Bridgewater, and that's a good thing. As talented as she is, Bridgewater is fond of embarking on extended scat flights that sometimes turn strident and long-winded. Not here, though."

Errol Nazareth of the Toronto Sun remarked, "Dee Dee Bridgewater isn't a name that flies out of people's mouths when discussing jazz singers. Which is a shame, 'cause she flexes a mean set of pipes on Prelude to a Kiss: The Duke Ellington Album."

== Track listing ==
No.	Title	Writer(s)	Length
1.	"Midnight Indigo"	Duke Ellington	2:26
2.	"I'm Beginning to See the Light"	Duke Ellington, Don George, Johnny Hodges, Harry James	5:03
3.	"Bli Blip"	Duke Ellington, Sid Kuller	4:16
4.	"Fleurette Africaine"	Duke Ellington	3:32
5.	"Prelude to a Kiss"	Duke Ellington, Irving Gordon, Irving Mills	3:52
6.	"Caravan"	Duke Ellington, Irving Mills, Juan Tizol	4:29
7.	"Solitude"	Eddie DeLange, Duke Ellington, Irving Mills	4:20
8.	"Mood Indigo"	Barney Bigard, Duke Ellington, Irving Mills	4:28
9.	"Night Creature: Fast"	Duke Ellington	4:16
10.	"Night Creature: Andante misterioso"	Duke Ellington	7:29
11.	"Night Creature: Moderato - Faster Swing - Moderato"	Duke Ellington	3:53
12.	"Come Sunday"	Duke Ellington	4:09
Total length:			52:13

== Personnel ==
- Dee Dee Bridgewater – vocals
- Bobby Watson – alto saxophone
- Charles McPherson – alto saxophone
- Ira Coleman – bass
- Jeff Hamilton – drum
- Cyro Baptista – percussion
- Cyrus Chestnut – piano
- Steve Turre – trombone
- Wynton Marsalis – trumpet
- Hassan Hakmoun – vocals, percussion, gimbra
- John Mauceri – conductor

== Release history ==
Release history and formats for Prelude to a Kiss: The Duke Ellington Album
Region	Date	Format	Label	Ref.
Various	October 8, 1996	CD; cassette	Philips Records	
