= Dear Ella =

Studio album by Dee Dee Bridgewater
- Released: September 30, 1997
- Recorded: January 29, 1997 –February 19, 1997
- Studio: Capitol Studios, Hollywood; Right Track Recording, New York; Abbey Road Studios, London; The Greek Recording Studios
- Genre: Vocal jazz
- Length: 36:31
- Label: Verve

Dee Dee Bridgewater chronology
Prelude to a Kiss: The Duke Ellington Album (1996)	Dear Ella (1997)	Live at Yoshi's (1998)

Dear Ella is a 1997 studio album by Dee Dee Bridgewater, recorded in tribute to Ella Fitzgerald, who had died the previous year.

For Dear Ella, Bridgewater won the Grammy Award for Best Jazz Vocal Album and Slide Hampton won the Grammy Award for Best Instrumental Arrangement Accompanying Vocalist(s) for his arrangement of "Cotton Tail" at the 40th Grammy Awards.

== Reception ==
Professional ratings
Review scores
Source	Rating
AllMusic	4/5 stars
The Austin Chronicle	3.5/5 stars
The Encyclopedia of Popular Music	4/5 stars
The Penguin Guide to Jazz	3.5/4 stars
The Virgin Encyclopedia of Jazz	4/5 stars
Tom Hull	B+

Raoul Hernandez of The Austin Chronicle stated, "As with nature, music is in a constant state of regeneration. For every fallen John Coltrane there's a James Carter, for every departed Miles Davis, a Terence Blanchard. Sometimes it takes generations to fill a hole, but new trees sprout every day. One forest in need of re-seeding has long been the Satin Doll woods, where craters left by Billie Holiday, Sarah Vaughan, and Ella Fitzgerald still gape. Only recently has Cassandra Wilson helped fill the gap, and now with Dear Ella, Dee Dee Bridgewater is ready to take her side." All About Jazz review commented, "Overall, this disc is a good, pleasant listen for fans of scatting and upbeat big band swing singing. While the theme is a tribute to Ella, don't pick this up expecting to hear her ghost. While Bridgewater is brave enough to take on all this material and the legend of Ella, she is also smart enough to realize there is only one Ella, and that she needs to sing like Dee Dee to be successful. At times, the melodies involved in several of the songs are obscured somewhat by Bridgewater's R’n’B-ish stylings, but her effort on these songs is real and cannot be dismissed. Bridgewater had the privilege of meeting Ella on multiple occasions, and seems to have been genuinely influenced by her singing and her personality. This project seems to be her way of bidding farewell to jazz's true First Lady of Song."

== Track listing ==
1. "A-Tisket, A-Tasket" (Van Alexander, Ella Fitzgerald) – 2:32
2. "Mack the Knife" (lyrics: Marc Blitzstein, Bertolt Brecht; music: Kurt Weill) – 3:59
3. "Undecided" (lyrics: Leo Robin; music: Charlie Shavers) – 6:22
4. "Midnight Sun" (music: Sonny Burke, Lionel Hampton; lyrics: Johnny Mercer) – 7:22
5. "Let's Do It, Let's Fall in Love" (Cole Porter) – 3:31
6. "How High the Moon" (music: Morgan Hamilton; lyrics: Nancy Lewis) – 5:05
7. "(If You Can't Sing It) You'll Have to Swing It (Mr. Paganini)" (Sam Coslow) – 6:34
8. "Cotton Tail" (Duke Ellington) – 2:58
9. "My Heart Belongs to Daddy" (Porter) – 5:05
10. "On a Slow Boat to China" (Frank Loesser) – 2:57
11. "Oh, Lady be Good!" (George Gershwin, Ira Gershwin) – 3:39
12. "Stairway to the Stars" (lyrics: Mitchell Parish; music: Frank Signorelli, Matty Malneck) – 4:10
13. "Dear Ella" (Kenny Burrell) – 4:56

== Personnel ==
- Dee Dee Bridgewater – vocals
- Cecil Bridgewater – trumpet, arranger, conductor
- Virgil Jones – trumpet, horn, soloist
- Byron Stripling, Ron Tooley, Diego Urcola – trumpet
- Slide Hampton – trombone, arranger, conductor
- Clarence Banks – trombone, horn, soloist
- Benny Powell, Robert Trowers – trombone
- Douglas Purviance – bass trombone
- F. Robert Lloyd – horn
- James Anderson – tuba
- Antonio Hart – alto saxophone, soloist
- Jeff Clayton – alto saxophone
- Teodross Avery, Bill Easley – tenor saxophone
- Patience Higgins – baritone saxophone
- R. Taylor – flute
- Roy Jowitt – clarinet
- Alfred Wallbank – bass clarinet
- Richard Morgan – oboe
- Lou Levy – piano, arranger
- Milt Jackson – vibraphone
- Kenny Burrell – guitar, arranger
- Ray Brown – double bass
- André Ceccarelli, Grady Tate – drums
- Alan Hakin – percussion
- Boguslaw Kostecki, David Nolan, T. Williams, Rolf Wilson – violin
- John Graham, Garfield Jackson – viola
- Peter Willison – cello
- John Clayton – big band arranger and conductor

=== Production ===
- Rob Eaton, Keith Grant, Al Schmitt – engineer
- Peter Doell, Koji Egawa, Brian Garten, Alex Marcou – assistant engineer
- Jean Luc Barilla – design
- Philippe Pierangeli – photography

== Chart positions ==
Chart (1997)	Peak position
French Albums (SNEP)	46
US Jazz Albums (Billboard)	5

== Release history ==
Release history and formats for Dear Ella
Region	Date	Format	Label	Ref.
Various	September 30, 1997	CD	Verve Records	
