= Live in Paris (Dee Dee Bridgewater album) =

Live album by Dee Dee Bridgewater
- Released: 1987
- Recorded: 24–25 November 1986
- Venue: New Morning, Paris, France
- Genre: Jazz
- Length: 56:35
- Label: Just'In Distribution, Charly, Impulse!
- Producer: Jean-Pierre Grosz, Dee Dee Bridgewater

Dee Dee Bridgewater chronology
Dee Dee Bridgewater (1980)	Live in Paris (1987)	Victim of Love (1989)

Live in Paris is a 1987 live album by American jazz singer Dee Dee Bridgewater. With this album, Bridgewater copped a Grammy Award nomination in the category of Best Jazz Vocal Performance, Female.

== Background ==
Produced by Jean-Pierre Grosz and Dee Dee Bridgewater, Live In Paris was recorded on 24–25 November 1986, at the New Morning jazz club in Paris, France.

The album was initially released in France via Just'In Distribution and eventually in Europe via Charly Records. In 1989, MCA Records released the album in the US on their Impulse! vanity label. During the 1990s, the album was digitally remastered and reissued on Verve Records.

== Critical reception ==
Professional ratings
Review scores
Source	Rating
AllMusic	4/5 stars
The Encyclopedia of Popular Music	2/5 stars
The Penguin Guide to Jazz	3/4 stars
The Virgin Encyclopedia of Jazz	2/5 stars
The San Diego Union-Tribune	4/5 stars
Tom Hull	B+

Scott Yanow of AllMusic wrote: "This 1986 recording started her artistic 'comeback' and showed that she had developed and matured during her years in Europe. Backed by her regular French rhythm section, Bridgewater is in spirited and creative form.... Her arrival as a major singer in the years since this set has been a welcome event. Recommended." Jeff Simon of The Buffalo News noted: "Terrific. Until a whole new wave of singers came along in the '80s, expatriate Bridgewater was one of the precious few keeping alive the tradition of jazz song... Living in Paris has done her good. She has -- literally -- never been better than this."

The San Diego Union-Tribune praised the album, saying: "Backed by an adept French trio, she extracts new nuances from Miles Davis' 'All Blues' and "Erroll Garner's 'Misty,' scats up a storm on Ray Noble's 'Cherokee' and belts out 'Dr. Feelgood' and 'Stormy Monday' with enough vigor and sensuality to give Etta James a run for her money. By doing so, Bridgewater has produced what may well be the best female jazz vocal album of the year." Jack Fuller of the Chicago Tribune stated: "Here`s one for the permanent collection. Dee Dee Bridgewater has what only a few jazz singers each generation has-the ideas, the energy and the vocal equipment to make the music complete. Bridgewater delivers on everything from the Erroll Garner standard, 'Misty,' to the down and dirty 'Dr. Feelgood' and 'Medley Blues.' And when she improvises, it has just the right balance of reference and innovaton. The references may be to Sarah Vaughan, Carmen McRae, and Betty Carter, but you'd better think of adding Dee Dee Bridgewater to the short list of standards."

George Varga of The San Diego Union-Tribune called Live in Paris one of 1989's best jazz albums.

== Track listing ==
No.	Title	Writer(s)	Length
1.	"All Blues"	Miles Davis, Oscar Brown Jr.	6:23
2.	"Misty"	Erroll Garner	8:26
3.	"On a Clear Day"	Burton Lane	5:21
4.	"Dr. Feelgood"	Aretha Franklin	5:30
5.	"There Is No Greater Love"	Isham Jones, Marty Symes	7:06
6.	"Here's That Rainy Day"	James Van Heusen	7:31
7.	"Medley Blues"	Peter Chatman, T-Bone Walker	8:16
8.	"Cherokee"	Ray Noble	5:14
9.	"How High the Moon"	Nancy Hamilton, Morgan Lewis	2:48
Total length:			56:35

== Personnel ==
Band

- Dee Dee Bridgewater – vocals
- Hervé Sellin – piano
- Antoine Bonfils – bass
- André Ceccarelli – drums

Production

- Jean-Pierre Grosz – producer
- Jean-Pierre Gouache – recording engineer
- Jean-Louis Bucchi – mixing

== Original release history ==
Release history and formats for Live in Paris
Region	Date	Format	Label	Ref.
Various	1987	LP; CD; cassette	Just'In; Charly; Impulse!	
