= Keeping Tradition =

Studio album by Dee Dee Bridgewater
- Released: 1993
- Recorded: 8–10 December 1992
- Studio: Plus XXX Studios, Paris, France
- Genre: Jazz
- Length: 57:00
- Label: Verve 519 607-2
- Producer: Dee Dee Bridgewater

Dee Dee Bridgewater chronology
In Montreux (1992)	Keeping Tradition (1993)	Love and Peace: A Tribute to Horace Silver (1995)

Keeping Tradition is a studio album by American jazz singer Dee Dee Bridgewater released in 1993 via Verve Records. With this album Bridgewater copped a Grammy nomination in the category of Best Jazz Vocal Performance.

== Critical reception ==
Professional ratings
Review scores
Source	Rating
AllMusic	4/5 stars
The Penguin Guide to Jazz	3.5/4 stars
The Rolling Stone Jazz & Blues Album Guide	3/5 stars
The Virgin Encyclopedia of Jazz	3/5 stars
Tampa Bay Times	4/5 stars
San Diego Union-Tribune	3/5 stars
Chicago Sun-Times	3.5/5 stars

Lloyd Sachs of the Chicago Sun-Times declared "Dee Dee Bridgewater boasts a delightfully "pure" jazz voice, a lithe way of phrasing and an exuberance that can't be learned. But it took her a long time to decide what kind of singer she wanted to be: A Flora Purim-type space traveler? A Broadway belter, as she was in "The Wiz"? A crossover star? The ultimate answer is announced by the title of her latest and best album, "Keeping Tradition." Backed by her trio, Bridgewater casts her lilting charm and scat-happiness across upbeat standards like "Just One of Those Things" and treats ballads like "Angel Eyes" with strong, frill-free emotion."

T. Michael Crowell of the San Diego Union-Tribune with praise wrote, "Keeping Tradition" is Bridgewater's valentine to the standards, a love note to Gershwin and Porter, to Johnny Burke and Horace Silver...Bridgewater's gospel-flavored voice hits all the right notes and phrases, and although she's not original, it's still a pleasure to hear the old songs done the old way. It's simply a matter of keeping tradition."

Phyllis Bailey of the Tampa Bay Times proclaimed, "It's hard not to think of Ella Fitzgerald and Sarah Vaughn as vocalist Dee Dee Bridgewater floats effortlessly through these standards. She bounces back and forth with a faultless intimacy between the two jazz divas' signature sounds. But there's enough of Bridgewater's own energy and style to keep the songs fresh. Her voice is warm and inviting, backed by a trio (saxophone, drums and bass)."

George Kanzler of the Star Ledger favourably found, "On this album Bridgewater sings in the classic context of a jazz trio, European musicians with whom she has obviously achieved considerable rapport. It features bassist/arranger Hein van de Gyen, pianist Thierry Eliez and drummer Andre Ceccarelli....Bridgewater is a consummate jazz singer with a distinctive style and personal approach that flow smoothly out of the great jazz tradition. She can effortlessly swing on uptempo tunes, is a resourceful and engaging scat singer, and can be breathtakingly captivating on ballads."

Scott Yanow of AllMusic wrote: "After performing a wide variety of music (much of it commercial) for 15 years, in the mid-'80s Dee Dee Bridgewater returned to jazz... This set with her regular French quartet has Bridgewater exploring and swinging some of her favorite standards... This CD is highly recommended, as are all of Dee Dee Bridgewater's Verve recordings."

George Kanzler of the Star-Ledger placed Keeping Tradition among his list of 1994's top 12 jazz albums.

== Track listing ==
No.	Title	Writer(s)	Length
1.	"Just One of Those Things"	Cole Porter	2:55
2.	"Fascinating Rhythm"	George Gershwin	4:05
3.	"The Island"	Ivan Lins, Vítor Martins, Alan and Marilyn Bergman	3:41
4.	"Angel Eyes"	Matt Dennis, Earl Brent	5:51
5.	"What Is This Thing Called Love?"	Cole Porter	3:14
6.	"Les Feuilles Mortes (Autumn Leaves)"	Joseph Kosma, Jacques Prévert	6:49
7.	"Medley: I'm a Fool to Want You / I Fall in Love Too Easily"	Jack Wolf, Joel Herron, Frank Sinatra / Jule Styne, Sammy Cahn	4:10
8.	"Lullaby of Birdland"	George Shearing, George David Weiss	7:04
9.	"What a Little Moonlight Can Do"	Harry Woods	3:11
10.	"Love Vibrations"	Horace Silver	5:38
11.	"Polka Dots and Moonbeams (Around a Pug-Nosed Dream)"	Jimmy Van Heusen, Johnny Burke	5:23
12.	"Sister Sadie"	Horace Silver	4:37
Total length:			57:00

== Personnel ==
- Dee Dee Bridgewater – vocals
- Thierry Eliez – piano
- Hein van de Geyn – bass, arrangements
- André Ceccarelli – drums

== Release history ==
Release history and formats for Keeping Tradition
Region	Date	Format	Label	Ref.
Various	1993	CD; cassette	Verve Records	
