= Just Family =

Studio album by Dee Dee Bridgewater
- Released: June 1977
- Recorded: 1977
- Studio: Chateau Recorders, North Hollywood, CA
- Genre: Jazz
- Length: 39:34
- Label: Elektra
- Producer: Stanley Clarke

Dee Dee Bridgewater chronology
Dee Dee Bridgewater (1976)	Just Family (1977)	Bad for Me (1979)

Just Family is the third studio album by American jazz singer Dee Dee Bridgewater. The album reached No. 13 on the Billboard Top Jazz Albums chart.

== Reception ==
Professional ratings
Review scores
Source	Rating
AllMusic	3/5 stars
The Encyclopedia of Popular Music	3/5 stars
Jazzwise	3/5 stars
The Penguin Guide to Jazz	3/4 stars
The Virgin Encyclopedia of Jazz	3/5 stars

Andy Kellman of AllMusic noted: "Neither 1977's Just Family nor 1979's Bad for Me can be considered Dee Dee Bridgewater's best work, but fans of mature, mid- to late-'70s R&B should find them moderately appealing. Though Bridgewater would not really hit her stride until her return to jazz in the '90s, she was more than competent when it came to fitting in with the likes of Phyllis Hyman, Patrice Rushen, Minnie Riperton, and Patti Austin."

== Track listing ==
No.	Title	Writer(s)	Length
1.	"Just Family"	Stanley Clarke, Richard Duncan, Gilbert Moses	5:06
2.	"Maybe Today"	Gilbert Moses	6:54
3.	"Children Are the Spirit (Of the World)"	Stanley Clarke, George Duke, Ray Gomez, Gilbert Moses	3:07
4.	"Sorry Seems to Be the Hardest Word"	Elton John, Bernie Taupin	4:58
5.	"Sweet Rain"	John Barnes, Sharon Barnes	3:05
6.	"Open Up Your Eyes"	Ronnie Foster	5:33
7.	"Night Moves"	Michael Franks, Michael Small	3:12
8.	"Thank the Day (You Walked into My Life)"	Gilbert Moses	5:17
9.	"Melody Maker"	William Allen	2:22
Total length:			39:34

== Personnel ==
- Dee Dee Bridgewater – vocals
- Stanley Clarke – arranger, bass, producer
- George Duke – keyboards
- Ronnie Foster – keyboards, Moogs
- Bobbye Lyle – piano, keyboards
- Chick Corea – electric piano
- Ray Gomez – guitar
- David T. Walker – guitar
- Alphonso Johnson – bass
- Scarlet Rivera – violin
- Harvey Mason – drums
- Leon "Ndugu" Chancler – drums
- Airto Moreira – percussion

"[ Norman Fearrington] - drums

== Charts ==
Year	Chart	Position
1978	Billboard Top Jazz Albums	13
1978	Billboard 200	170

== Original release history ==
Release history and formats for Just Family
Region	Date	Format	Label	Ref.
North America	June 1978	LP	Elektra Records	
