= Memphis... Yes, I'm Ready =

Studio album by Dee Dee Bridgewater
- Released: September 15, 2017
- Recorded: September 5–11, 2016
- Studio: Royal Studios, Memphis, TN
- Genre: Soul, R&B
- Length: 1:02:03
- Label: OKeh
- Producer: Dee Dee Bridgewater, Tulani Bridgewater Kowalski, Kirk Whalum, Lawrence "Boo" Mitchell

Dee Dee Bridgewater chronology
Dee Dee's Feathers (2015)	Memphis... Yes, I'm Ready (2017)	Elemental (2025)

Professional ratings
Review scores
Source	Rating
Allmusic	4/5 stars
Jazz Forum	4/5 stars
Jazzwise	3/5 stars
Record Collector	3/5 stars
Tom Hull	B+

Memphis... Yes, I'm Ready is a 2017 studio album by American singer Dee Dee Bridgewater released via the OKeh label.

== Background ==
Returning to her birthplace, Memphis, Tennessee (her family moved to Flint, MI, when she was three years old), Dee Dee Bridgewater embraces the music she grew up with, R&B and soul. Her father was also "a young on-air DJ with the moniker ‘Matt the Platter Cat.’" For the project she teamed up with Lawrence "Boo" Mitchell, owner of the Royal Studios in Memphis, where Mitchell's father Willie already produced the music of Al Green, Ann Peebles, Quiet Elegance and others for his label Hi Records. The musicians were locals as well, such as saxophonist Kirk Whalum, guitarist Garry Goin, and Charles Hodges from The Hodges Brothers, the usual rhythm section of the Hi recordings. Featured as vocal backup was the Stax Music Academy. The repertoire was meant to be as southern as the interpretation; it reached from "The Thrill Is Gone" (B.B. King), "Hound Dog" (Big Mama Thornton), and the gospel song "Take My Hand, Precious Lord" (Mahalia Jackson) to "Why (Am I Treated So Bad)" (The Staple Singers), "Try a Little Tenderness" (Otis Redding), and two songs by Isaac Hayes and David Porter.

In her interview for The New York Times, when asked about her motivation to record the album, Bridgewater said "At this point I just want to give exposure to the things that I believe in. In that sense, I did this album for me." In her interview for the Chicago Tribune, Bridgewater also stated "I was looking for something to do that would be fun, that would be simple, that could make me dance, because I was getting toward the end of my mother’s transition and feeling a bit depressed."

== Reception ==
Mark Deming of Allmusic noted that "with a top-shelf soul band cooking behind her, Dee Dee Bridgewater steps up as a top-shelf soul singer, smooth when she should be, good and gritty when she wants to be, and sounding tough, passionate, and firmly in command at all times... Dee Dee Bridgewater strips off some of the polish from her style on Memphis...Yes, I'm Ready without betraying her talent or best musical instincts, and this detour into Soul City is a treat that should please her fans, as well as anyone who digs Southern soul."

Mark McKergow of London Jazz News wrote: "Much of the repertoire is instantly recognisable [...] being given the Dee Dee treatment. The band assembled for the sessions offers fine support, [...] the predominant sound is low-down, bassy and utterly solid."

== Track listing ==
No.	Title	Writer(s)	Length
1.	"Yes, I'm Ready"	Barbara Mason	4:57
2.	"Giving Up"	Van McCoy	4:55
3.	"I Can't Get Next to You"	Barrett Strong, Norman Whitfield	5:16
4.	"Going Down Slow"	St. Louis Jimmy Oden	4:45
5.	"Why (Am I Treated So Bad)"	Roebuck Staples	4:36
6.	"B-A-B-Y"	Isaac Hayes, David Porter	4:04
7.	"The Thrill Is Gone"	Rick Ravon Darnell, Roy Hawkins	5:38
8.	"The Sweeter He Is"	Isaac Hayes, David Porter	6:45
9.	"I Can't Stand the Rain"	Donald Maurice Bryant, Bernard Miller, Ann Peebles	3:06
10.	"Don't Be Cruel"	Otis Blackwell, Elvis Presley	4:40
11.	"Hound Dog"	Jerry Leiber, Mike Stoller	3:38
12.	"Try a Little Tenderness"	James Campbell, Reginald Connelly, Harry Woods	5:25
13.	"Take My Hand, Precious Lord"	Thomas A. Dorsey, Sobie Frank Frazier, Jeff Majors	4:18
Total length:			1:02:03

== Personnel ==
Band

- Dee Dee Bridgewater – vocals
- Kirk Whalum – tenor and baritone saxophone
- Lannie McMillan, Kirk Smothers – tenor saxophone
- Marc Franklin – trumpet
- Kameron Whalum – trombone
- John Stoddart – keyboards, vocal arrangements
- Charles Hodges – Hammond organ
- Garry Goin – guitar
- Jackie Clark – bass
- James Sexton – drums
- Lawrence "Boo" Mitchell – cymbals, electric bongos, tambourine
- Sharisse Norman, Candise Rayborn-Marshall, Kevin Whalum – background vocals
- Stax Music Academy – vocals (background)

Production

- Dee Dee Bridgewater, Kirk Whalum, Tulani Bridgewater Kowalski, Lawrence "Boo" Mitchell – producers
- John Stoddart – associate producer
- Ted Jensen – engineer
- Tulani Bridgewater Kowalski – art direction, cover art, photography
- Thomas Brodin – design
- Rachel Ashley – photography
- Dee Dee Bridgewater – liner notes

== Chart positions ==
Chart (2017)	Peak position
French Albums (SNEP)	123
US Jazz Albums (Billboard 200)	10

== Release history ==
Release history and formats for Memphis... Yes, I'm Ready
Region	Date	Format	Label	Ref.
Various	September 15, 2017	CD; digital	OKeh Records; Sony Masterworks	
