= Dee Dee's Feathers =

Studio album by Dee Dee Bridgewater
- Released: 14 August 2015
- Recorded: 23–25 March 2014
- Studio: Esplanade Studios, New Orleans, LA
- Genre: Jazz
- Length: 1:07:18
- Label: OKeh / Masterworks (Sony)
- Producer: Irvin Mayfield

Dee Dee Bridgewater chronology
Midnight Sun (2011)	Dee Dee's Feathers (2015)	Memphis... Yes, I'm Ready (2017)

Professional ratings
Review scores
Source	Rating
Allmusic	3.5/5 stars
All About Jazz	4/5 stars
Jazz Forum	4/5 stars
Jazzwise	4/5 stars
laut.de	5/5 stars
The Music	3.5/4 stars
PopMatters	7/10
The National	3/5 stars
Tom Hull	B+

Dee Dee's Feathers is a 2015 studio album by American jazz singer Dee Dee Bridgewater recorded together with trumpeter Irvin Mayfield and the eighteen-piece New Orleans Jazz Orchestra. The album was released on 14 August 2015 via OKeh and Masterworks labels.

== Recording ==
Dee Dee's Feathers was recorded at Esplanade Studios, a historic church of the 1920s turned music studio, located in the heart of the Tremé neighborhood in New Orleans. Says Bridgewater "It was at the groundbreaking ceremony of the future site of the Jazz Market where I had the idea of a collaborative recording... I thought that Irvin Mayfield, NOJO, and I needed a musical 'calling card' so to speak, a product that epitomized the joys of our accumulative collaborations. When I shared the idea with Irvin, the seed was planted. After several emails, Irvin's song suggestions, song keys picked out over the phone, we found ourselves at Esplanade Studio exactly one month later. Under Irvin Mayfield's skillful leadership, band members had done the arrangements, and over the course of three days we recorded, filmed, bonded, and laughed our way through the most extraordinary recording experience I've had." Mayfield adds that "This album is a testament to the continued relevance of New Orleans not only as a thriving city but also as a muse for communicating truth, love and beauty. Dee Dee Bridgewater leads us through a new artistic moment while answering a mandate created over a century ago by Jazz geniuses like Buddy Bolden, Jelly Roll Morton, Sidney Bechet and Louis Armstrong. She proves through her art that New Orleans is not just a city but more importantly an idea that can make your heart and soul feel better."

== Reception ==
Matt Collar of Allmusic wrote "A collaboration between Bridgewater, New Orleans trumpeter Irvin Mayfield, and the New Orleans Jazz Orchestra (NOJO), the album finds Bridgewater combining her love of New Orleans' musical past with the Crescent City's vibrant present... These are warm, largely acoustic arrangements that breathe with the energy of a live performance... Bridgewater has built a career out of combining her love of the tradition with her desire to push the boundaries of jazz style, and Dee Dee's Feathers is no exception." Dan Bilawski of All About Jazz commented "Dee Dee's Feather's is simply delightful, capable of tickling a listener's fancy as only music from The Big Easy can do."

In his review John Paul of PopMatters stated "Dee Dee Feathers is designed to mark the 10th anniversary of Hurricane Katrina and functions as a love letter of sorts to the city of New Orleans and its rich musical history. Partnering with trumpeter Irvin Mayfield and the New Orleans Jazz Orchestra, Bridgewater tackles a handful of standards and originals associated with the city itself, showing off a range of styles and sentiments afforded by the city’s rich musical and cultural heritage... An undeniably talented force Bridgewater manages to elevate even the most staid material here with her vibrant performances and clear love of and appreciation for the work. Through the sheer power of her personality, Dee Dee’s Feathers succeeds even where it shouldn’t..."

== Track listing ==
No.	Title	Writer(s)	Length
1.	"One Fine Thing"	Harry Connick, Jr.	6:31
2.	"What a Wonderful World"	Bob Thiele, George David Weiss	7:20
3.	"Big Chief"	Earl King Johnson	6:19
4.	"Saint James Infirmary"	Unknown	5:15
5.	"Dee Dee's Feathers"	Bridgewater	2:47
6.	"New Orleans"	Hoagy Carmichael	6:38
7.	"Treme Song / Do Whatcha Wanna"	John Boutté	5:49
8.	"Come Sunday"	Duke Ellington	4:45
9.	"Congo Square"	Bill Summers, Bridgewater, Irvin Mayfield	4:34
10.	"C'est ici que je t'aime"	Mayfield	6:33
11.	"Do You Know What It Means"	Eddie DeLange, Louis Alter	6:18
12.	"Whoopin' Blues"	Benny Jones, Bruce Christian Brackman, Craig Klein, Julius McKee, Lionel Batiste, Roger Hayward Lewis	4:20
Total length:			1:07:18

== Chart positions ==
Chart (2015)	Peak position
French Albums (SNEP)	158
Dutch Albums (Album Top 100)	69
US Jazz Albums (Billboard 200)	11

== Release history ==
Release history and formats for Dee Dee's Feathers
Region	Date	Format	Label	Ref.
Various	August 14, 2015	CD; digital	OKeh Records; Sony Masterworks	
