= Live at Yoshi's (Dee Dee Bridgewater album) =

Live album by Dee Dee Bridgewater
- Released: February 15, 2000
- Recorded: April 23–25, 1998
- Venue: Jack London Square, Oakland, California; Yoshi's, Oakland, California
- Genre: Vocal jazz
- Length: 1:07:55
- Label: Verve
- Producer: Dee Dee Bridgewater

Dee Dee Bridgewater chronology
Dear Ella (1997)	Live at Yoshi's (2000)	This Is New (1998)

Live at Yoshi's is a 1998 live album by Dee Dee Bridgewater, recorded at Yoshi's Jazz Club in Oakland, California, United States.

Bridgewater sings several songs from her previous album, Dear Ella (1997), a tribute to the jazz singer Ella Fitzgerald, who had died a year previously, and this live album was partly recorded on what would have been Fitzgerald's 81st birthday.

== Reception ==
Professional ratings
Review scores
Source	Rating
AllMusic	4/5 stars
Robert Christgau	A−
The Penguin Guide to Jazz	3.5/4 stars
Tom Hull	B+

Robert Christgau commented, "After fruitlessly sampling whatever Bridgewater albums came my way for 25 years, I harbored few hopes that this one would escape decorum, delusions of grandeur, and/or commercial confusion just because it was live. But it does, and then it keeps on going. It's funny, it's sexy, it swings like crazy. Long workouts on 'On a Slow Boat to China' and 'Love for Sale' show off her fabled chops without dwelling on them. The many extended scats are worthy of Ella herself. Even the gaffe proves her heart is in the right place when she's out there working the crowd – James Brown's 'Sex Machine'." The All About Jazz review stated, "Power. Dee Dee Bridgewater is as formidable a vocalist as anyone singing. She is the Jackie Joiner of jazz vocalists. Her athletic style is infectious and she proves she is one of the few who jazz vocalists who can effectively scat and use other Betty Carter-like fireworks."

== Track listing ==
1. "Undecided" (Sid Robin, Charlie Shavers) – 8:57
2. "On a Slow Boat to China" (Frank Loesser) – 6:09
3. "Stairway to the Stars" (Matty Malneck, Mitchell Parish, Frank Signorelli) – 7:56
4. "What a Little Moonlight Can Do" (Harry M. Woods) – 5:13
5. "Get Up (I Feel Like Being A) Sex Machine" (James Brown) – 2:32
6. "Midnight Sun" (Sonny Burke, Lionel Hampton, Johnny Mercer) – 7:08
7. "Cherokee" (Ray Noble) – 6:14
8. "Love for Sale" (vocal melody: Cole Porter, music: Herbie Hancock) – 14:06
9. "Cotton Tail" (Duke Ellington) – 9:42

== Personnel ==
- Dee Dee Bridgewater – vocals
- Thierry Eliez – Hammond organ, piano
- Thomas Bramerie – double bass
- Ali Muhammed Jackson – percussion, drums

== Chart positions ==
Chart (2000)	Peak position
US Jazz Albums (Billboard)	20

== Release history ==
Release history and formats for Live at Yoshi's
Region	Date	Format	Label	Ref.
Various	February 15, 2000	CD	Verve Records	
