= Afro Blue (Dee Dee Bridgewater album) =

Studio album by Dee Dee Bridgewater
- Released: 1974
- Recorded: 10, 12–14 March 1974
- Studio: AOI Studios, Tokyo
- Genre: Jazz
- Length: 40:39
- Label: Trio Records PA-7095
- Producer: Takao Ishizuka

Dee Dee Bridgewater chronology
Afro Blue (1974)	Dee Dee Bridgewater (1976)

Professional ratings
Review scores
Source	Rating
Allmusic	4/5 stars
The Encyclopedia of Popular Music	2/5 stars
The Virgin Encyclopedia of Jazz	2/5 stars

Afro Blue is the debut studio album by American jazz singer Dee Dee Bridgewater. The record was released in Japan in 1974, when she was 23, via Trio Records label. The album was recorded in Tokyo with a quintet of musicians including brothers Ron and Cecil Bridgwater.

== Track listing ==
No.	Title	Writer(s)	Length
1.	"Afro Blue"	Mongo Santamaria, Oscar Brown, Jr.	8:27
2.	"Love Vibrations"	Horace Silver	5:55
3.	"Everyday I Have the Blues / Stormy Monday Blues"	Peter Chatman	8:09
4.	"Little B's Poem"	Bobby Hutcherson	3:08
5.	"Raindrops Keep Falling on My Head"	Burt Bacharach, Hal David	4:38
6.	"Love from the Sun"	Richard Clay	5:34
7.	"People Make the World Go Around"	Richard Clay	4:48
Total length:			40:39

== Personnel ==
Band

- Dee Dee Bridgewater – vocals
- George Mraz – bass
- Motohiko Hino – drums, bells
- Roland Hanna – piano
- Ron Bridgewater – tenor saxophone, cowbell, African castanets, vibra-clap
- Cecil Bridgewater – trumpet, kalimba

Production

- Takao Ishizuka – producer
- Kiyoshi Koyama – liner notes
- Y. Kannari – recording, mixing
- M. Ohkawa – recording, mixing

== Original release history ==
Release history and formats for Afro Blue
Region	Date	Format	Label	Ref.
North America	1974	LP	Trio Records	
