= Eleanora Fagan (1915–1959): To Billie with Love from Dee Dee Bridgewater =

Eleanora Fagan (1915–1959): To Billie With Love From Dee Dee Bridgewater

Studio album by Dee Dee Bridgewater
- Released: March 15, 2010
- Recorded: June 5–7, 2009
- Studio: Avatar Studios (New York City); Capitol (Los Angeles)
- Genre: Vocal jazz
- Length: 51:47
- Label: EmArcy
- Producer: Dee Dee Brdgewater

Dee Dee Bridgewater chronology
Red Earth (2007)	Eleanora Fagan (1915–1959): To Billie With Love From Dee Dee Bridgewater (2010)	Midnight Sun (2011)

Professional ratings
Review scores
Source	Rating
AllMusic	4/5 stars
Billboard	4.5/5 stars
The Buffalo News	2/4 stars
The Guardian	3/5 stars
Jazz Forum	5/5 stars
laut.de	4/5 stars
PopMatters	5/10
Tom Hull	B+

Eleanora Fagan (1915–1959): To Billie with Love From Dee Dee Bridgewater is a 2009 studio album by Dee Dee Bridgewater, recorded in tribute to Billie Holiday. It won the 2011 Grammy Award for Best Jazz Vocal Album, Bridgewater's third Grammy win in her career. Bridgewater had previously starred in Lady Day in the late 1980s, a biographical play about Holiday.

== Reception ==
Billboard's Gail Mitchell stated, "Bridgewater digs beneath the darkness and pain associated with Holiday's music, delivering a joyful take on—and deeper respect for—her predecessor's strengths as a vocalist and songwriter." John Fordham of The Guardian wrote, "This album, also featuring Holiday's repertoire, suggests a more contemporary feel, helped by terrific performances from saxophonist James Carter and bassist Christian McBride." Jeff Tamarkin in his review for AllMusic commented, "Carter's brooding bass clarinet and McBride's bass lend a foreboding quality to the take, Nash relies heavily on his cymbals to dramatic effect, and Gomez's piano is subtle, allowing the nakedness of Bridgewater's voice—at times unaccompanied—to retell this story that can never be told enough. It's a stunning finale to one of the finest Billie Holiday homages ever recorded." The Buffalo News review by Jeff Simon stated, "The good news is the Billie Holiday repertoire and guest musicians that include Lewis Nash, Christian McBride and, best of all, saxophonist James Carter. The bad news is everything else. As jazz singers go, Dee Dee Bridgewater has almost nothing whatsoever in common with Billie Holiday other than the reverence that is every jazz singer's birthright."

== Track listing ==
1. "Lady Sings the Blues" (Billie Holiday, Herbie Nichols) – 3:31
2. "All of Me" (Gerald Marks, Seymour Simons) – 2:58
3. "Good Morning Heartache" (Ervin Drake, Dan Fisher, Irene Higginbotham) – 5:10
4. "Lover Man (Oh, Where Can You Be?)" (Jimmy Davis, Roger ("Ram") Ramirez, and James Sherman) – 4:43
5. "You've Changed" (Bill Carey, Carl Fischer) – 5:11
6. "Miss Brown to You" (Leo Robin, Richard A. Whiting, Ralph Rainger) – 2:12
7. "Don't Explain" (Holiday, Arthur Herzog, Jr.) – 6:15
8. "Fine and Mellow" (Holiday) – 4:55
9. "Your Mother's Son-In-Law" (Alberta Nichols, Mann Holiner) – 2:46
10. "God Bless the Child" (Holiday, Herzog) – 5:13
11. "A Foggy Day" (George Gershwin, Ira Gershwin) – 4:33
12. "Strange Fruit" (Abel Meeropol) – 4:16

== Personnel ==
- Dee Dee Bridgewater – vocals, producer, artistic director
- James Carter – bass clarinet, alto flute, soprano saxophone, tenor saxophone
- Edsel Gomez – piano, arranger
- Christian McBride – double bass
- Lewis Nash – drums

Production

- Steve Genewick – assistant engineer
- Justin Gerrish
- Sangwook "Sunny" Nam – assistant mastering engineer
- Al Schmitt – engineer
- Tulani Bridgewater Kowalski – graphic supervision
- Dan Ouellette – liner notes
- Edward Powell – make-up
- Doug Sax – mastering
- Mark Higashino – photography

== Chart positions ==
Chart (2010)	Peak position
French Albums (SNEP)	134
Greek Albums (IFPI)	6
Spanish Albums (PROMUSICAE)	42
US Jazz Albums (Billboard)	19

== Release history ==
Release history and formats for Eleanora Fagan (1915–1959): To Billie With Love From Dee Dee Bridgewater
Region	Date	Format	Label	Ref.
Various	March 15, 2010	CD; digital	EmArcy Records	
