= This Is New (Dee Dee Bridgewater album) =

This is New

Studio album by Dee Dee Bridgewater
- Released: May 21, 2002
- Recorded: November 10 – December 29, 2001
- Studios: Capitol (Hollywood); Plus XXX (Paris)
- Genre: Vocal jazz
- Length: 36:31
- Label: Verve
- Producer: Dee Dee Bridgewater

Dee Dee Bridgewater chronology
Live at Yoshi's (1998)	This is New (2002)	J'ai deux amours (2005)

Professional ratings
Review scores
Source	Rating
Allmusic	3/5 stars
The Penguin Guide to Jazz	2/4 stars
Tom Hull	B

This is New is a 2002 album by Dee Dee Bridgewater, dedicated to the songs of Kurt Weill.

== Track listing ==
1. "This Is New" (Ira Gershwin) – 3:47
2. "Lost in the Stars" (Maxwell Anderson) – 5:36
3. "The Bilbao Song" (Michael Feingold, Frank McGuinness) – 10:24
4. "My Ship" (Ira Gershwin) – 4:56
5. "Alabama Song" (Bertolt Brecht) – 5:38
6. "The Saga of Jenny" (Ogden Nash) – 4:54
7. "Youkali" (Roger Fernay) – 3:54
8. "I'm a Stranger Here Myself" (Ogden Nash) – 5:50
9. "Speak Low" (Ogden Nash) – 4:17
10. "September Song" (Anderson) – 4:40
11. "Here I'll Stay" (Alan Jay Lerner) – 11:15

All music composed by Kurt Weill, lyricists in brackets.

== Personnel ==
- Dee Dee Bridgewater – vocals
- Thierry Eliez – Hammond B3 organ, piano, backing vocals, arrangements (tracks: 1, 2)
- Louis Winsberg – guitar
- Ira Coleman – double bass
- André Ceccarelli – drums
- Minino Garay – percussion
- Nicolas Folmer – trumpet
- Denis LeLoup – trombone
- Daniele Scannapieco – alto saxophone, flute
- Antonio Hart – alto saxophone (2, 10), flute (3)
- Juan José Mosalini – bandoneon (7)
- Cecil Bridgewater – arranger (except 1, 2), conductor
- Bernie Arcadio – string arrangements (4, 9)
- China Moses, Tulani Bridgewater Kowalski – backing vocals

== Chart positions ==
Chart (2002)	Peak position
French Albums (SNEP)	117
US Jazz Albums (Billboard)	7

== Release history ==
Release history and formats for This is New
Region	Date	Format	Label	Ref.
Various	May 21, 2002	CD	Verve Records	
