= Dee Dee Bridgewater (1980 album) =

Studio album by Dee Dee Bridgewater
- Released: 1980
- Studio: Sigma Sound, Philadelphia, Pennsylvania
- Genre: Jazz
- Length: 40:49
- Label: Elektra
- Producer: Thom Bell

Dee Dee Bridgewater chronology
Bad for Me (1979)	Dee Dee Bridgewater (1980)	Live in Paris (1987)

Professional ratings
Review scores
Source	Rating
AllMusic	3/5 stars
The Encyclopedia of Popular Music	3/5 stars
The Penguin Guide to Jazz	3/4 stars
The Virgin Encyclopedia of Jazz	3/5 stars
Tom Hull	B−

Dee Dee Bridgewater is a studio album by American jazz singer Dee Dee Bridgewater. Released in 1980 by the Elektra label, it is her second self-titled album. Two singles were released: "One in a Million (Guy)" and "When Love Comes Knockin'". The album was re-released on CD in 2006.

== Track listing ==
No.	Title	Writer(s)	Length
1.	"Lonely Disco Dancer"	Thom Bell, Joseph Jefferson, Richard Roebuck	4:57
2.	"When Love Comes Knockin'"	Thom Bell, Joe Ericksen, Dennis Caldirola	4:21
3.	"One in a Million (Guy)"	Thom Bell, Joe Ericksen	4:43
4.	"Gunshots in the Night"	Leroy Bell, Casey James	6:28
5.	"When You're in Love"	Casey James	6:28
6.	"That's the Way Love Should Feel"	Preston Glass, Alan Glass	4:28
7.	"Give in to Love"	Thom Bell, Linda Creed	5:11
8.	"Jody (Whoever You Are)"	Joseph Jefferson	4:13

== Personnel ==
Band

- Dee Dee Bridgewater – vocals
- Thom Bell, Casey James – keyboards
- Don Renaldo and His Strings and Horns – horns, strings
- Grant Reeves – saxophone
- Bobby Eli, Bill Neale – guitar
- Bob Babbitt – bass guitar
- Charles Collins – drums
- Leroy Bell, Larry Washington – percussion
- Barbara Ingram, Carla Benson, Evette Benton, Frankie Bleu, Carl Helm, George Merrill – backing vocals

Production

- Thom Bell – producer, conductor
- Dirk Devlin, Jim Gallagher, Ron Gangnes – recording engineers
- Ron Coro – art direction, design
- David Alexander – photography

== Original release history ==
Release history and formats for Dee Dee Bridgewater
Region	Date	Format	Label	Ref.
North America	1980	LP; cassette	Elektra Records	
