= Victim of Love (Dee Dee Bridgewater album) =

Studio album by Dee Dee Bridgewater
- Released: 1989
- Studio: Marcadet Studios, Paris; PUK Studio, Denmark; Studio Dames, Paris; Nidaros Trondheim Studio, Norway
- Genre: Jazz
- Length: 34:11
- Label: Polydor 841 199-1
- Producer: Jean-Pierre Grosz

Dee Dee Bridgewater chronology
| Live in Paris (1987) | Victim of Love (1989) | In Montreux (1992) |

Professional ratings
Review scores
| Source | Rating |
|---|---|
| AllMusic | 3/5 stars |
| The Penguin Guide to Jazz | 3/4 stars |
| The Virgin Encyclopedia of Jazz | 4/5 stars |

Victim of Love is a 1989 studio album by American jazz singer Dee Dee Bridgewater.

== Track listing ==
| No. | Title | Writer(s) | Length |
|---|---|---|---|
| 1. | "Heartache Caravan" | Dee Dee Bridgewater Arr: Kjetil Bjerkestrand | 4:32 |
| 2. | "Till the Next Somewhere" (featuring Ray Charles) | Ronnie Bird, Pierre Papadiamandis Arr: Kjetil Bjerkestrand | 5:03 |
| 3. | "Wall of Love" | Dee Dee Bridgewater, Pierre Papadiamandis. Arr: Kjetil Bjerkestrand | 3:51 |
| 4. | "Love Takes Chances" | Dee Dee Bridgewater | 4:28 |
| 5. | "I Go My Way" | | 3:25 |
| 6. | "Mr. Guitar Man" | Dee Dee Bridgewater. Arr: Kjetil Bjerkestrand | 4:51 |
| 7. | "Can't We Try Love Again" | Dee Dee Bridgewater, Michel Legrand. | 3:58 |
| 8. | "Sunset and Blue" | Michel Legrand | 4:03 |
| Total length: | | | 34:11 |

== Personnel ==
Band

- Dee Dee Bridgewater – vocals
- Ray Charles – piano

Kjetil Bjerkestrand, keyboards, programming and arranger.

Production

- Steve Forward – mixing
- Jean-Pierre Grosz – executive producer

== Original release history ==
Release history and formats for Victim of Love
| Region | Date | Format | Label | Ref. |
|---|---|---|---|---|
| North America | 1989 | LP; CD; cassette | Polydor Records | |
