= Dee Dee Bridgewater =

American jazz singer (born 1950)

Background information
- Born: Denise Eileen Garrett; May 27, 1950 (age 76); Memphis, Tennessee, U.S.
- Origin: Flint, Michigan, U.S.
- Genres: Jazz; smooth jazz; R&B; soul
- Occupations: Singer; actress; record producer; songwriter; UN Goodwill Ambassador; radio host
- Years active: 1966–present
- Labels: DDB Records; Sony Masterworks; OKeh Records; Verve; Elektra; MCA
- Spouses: Cecil Bridgewater (divorced) Gilbert Moses (m. 1977; div. 1985): Jean-Marie Durand
- Children: 3, incl. China Moses
- Website: www.deedeebridgewater.com

Dee Dee Bridgewater (born Denise Eileen Garrett, May 27, 1950) is an American jazz singer and actress. She is a three-time Grammy Award-winning singer-songwriter, as well as a Tony Award-winning stage actress. For 23 years, she was the host of National Public Radio's syndicated radio show JazzSet with Dee Dee Bridgewater. She is a United Nations Goodwill Ambassador for the Food and Agriculture Organization.

== Biography ==
Born to an African-American family in Memphis, Tennessee, Bridgewater was raised Catholic in Flint, Michigan. Her father, Matthew Garrett, was a jazz trumpeter and teacher at Manassas High School, and through his playing, she was exposed to jazz early on. At the age of 16, she was a member of a Rock and R&B trio, singing in clubs in Michigan. At 18, she studied at Michigan State University, before attending the University of Illinois at Urbana-Champaign. With the school's jazz band, she toured the Soviet Union in 1969.

The next year, she met trumpeter Cecil Bridgewater, and after their marriage, they moved to New York City, where Cecil played in Horace Silver's band.

In the early 1970s, Bridgewater joined the Thad Jones/Mel Lewis Jazz Orchestra as lead vocalist. This marked the beginning of her jazz career, and she performed with many of the jazz musicians of the time, such as Sonny Rollins, Dizzy Gillespie, Dexter Gordon, Max Roach, Rahsaan Roland Kirk, Wayne Garfield, and others. She performed at the Monterey Jazz Festival in 1973.

In 1974, her first solo album, titled Afro Blue, appeared, and she performed on Broadway in the musical The Wiz. For her role as Glinda the Good Witch she won a Tony Award in 1975 as "Best Featured Actress", and the musical also won the 1976 Grammy Award for Best Musical Show Album.

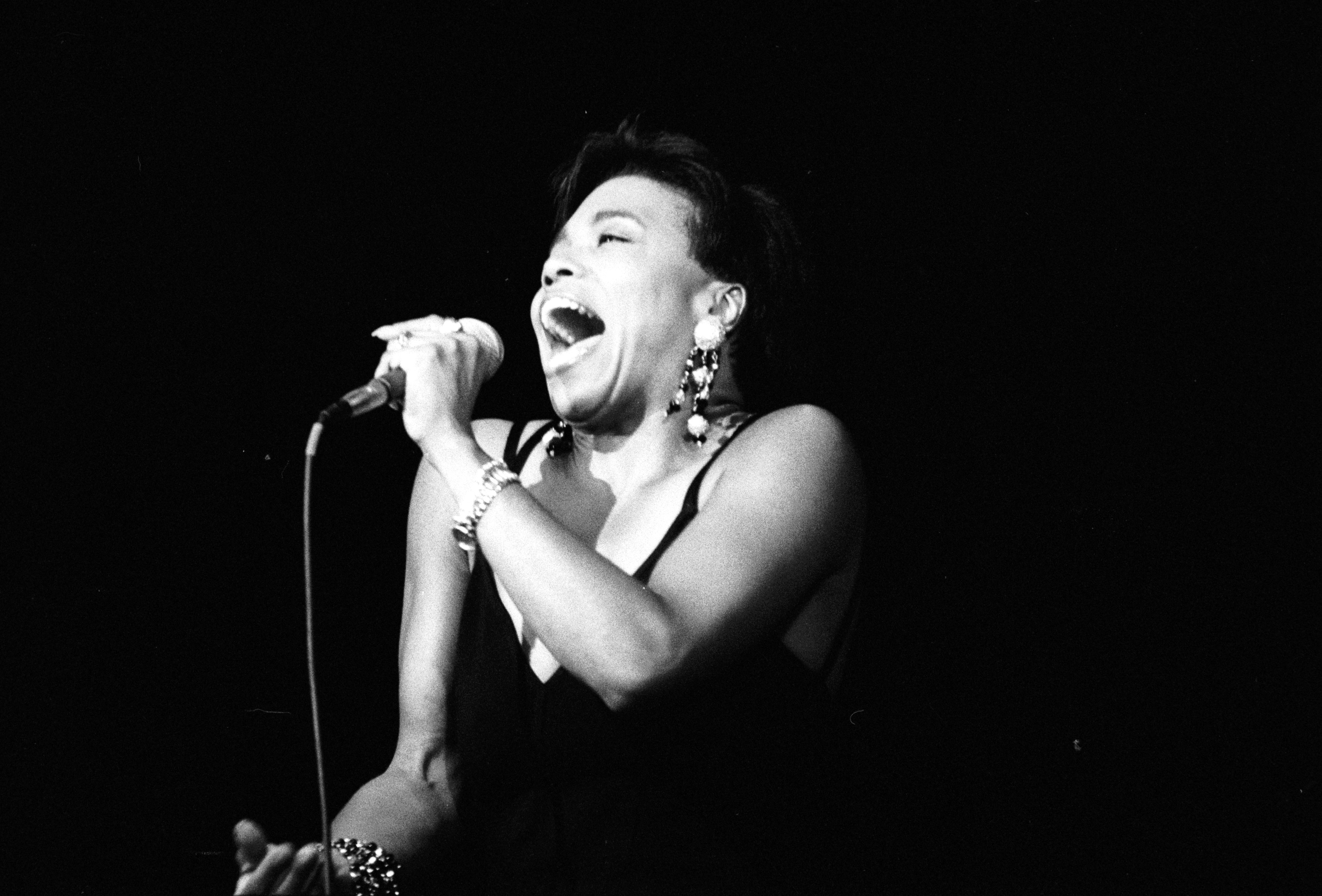
In concert in 1990

She subsequently appeared in several other stage productions. After touring France in 1984 with the musical Sophisticated Ladies, she moved to Paris in 1986. The same year saw her in Lady Day, as Billie Holiday, for which role she was nominated for the Laurence Olivier Award, as well as recording the song "Precious Thing" with Ray Charles, featured on her album Victim of Love.

In the late 1980s and early 1990s, she returned from the world of pop and contemporary R&B to jazz. She performed at the Sanremo Music Festival in Italy – with "Angel of the Night", the English version of the subsequently winning song "Uomini soli" – and the Montreux Jazz Festival in 1990, and four years later, she finally collaborated with Horace Silver, whom she had long admired, and released the album Love and Peace: A Tribute to Horace Silver. She also performed at the San Francisco Jazz Festival (1996). Her 1997 tribute album Dear Ella won her the 1998 Grammy Award for Best Jazz Vocal Album, and the 1998 album Live at Yoshi's was also worth a Grammy nomination. She performed again at the Monterey Jazz Festival in 1998. She has also explored on This Is New (2002) the songs of Kurt Weill, and, on her next album J'ai deux amours (2005), the French Classics.

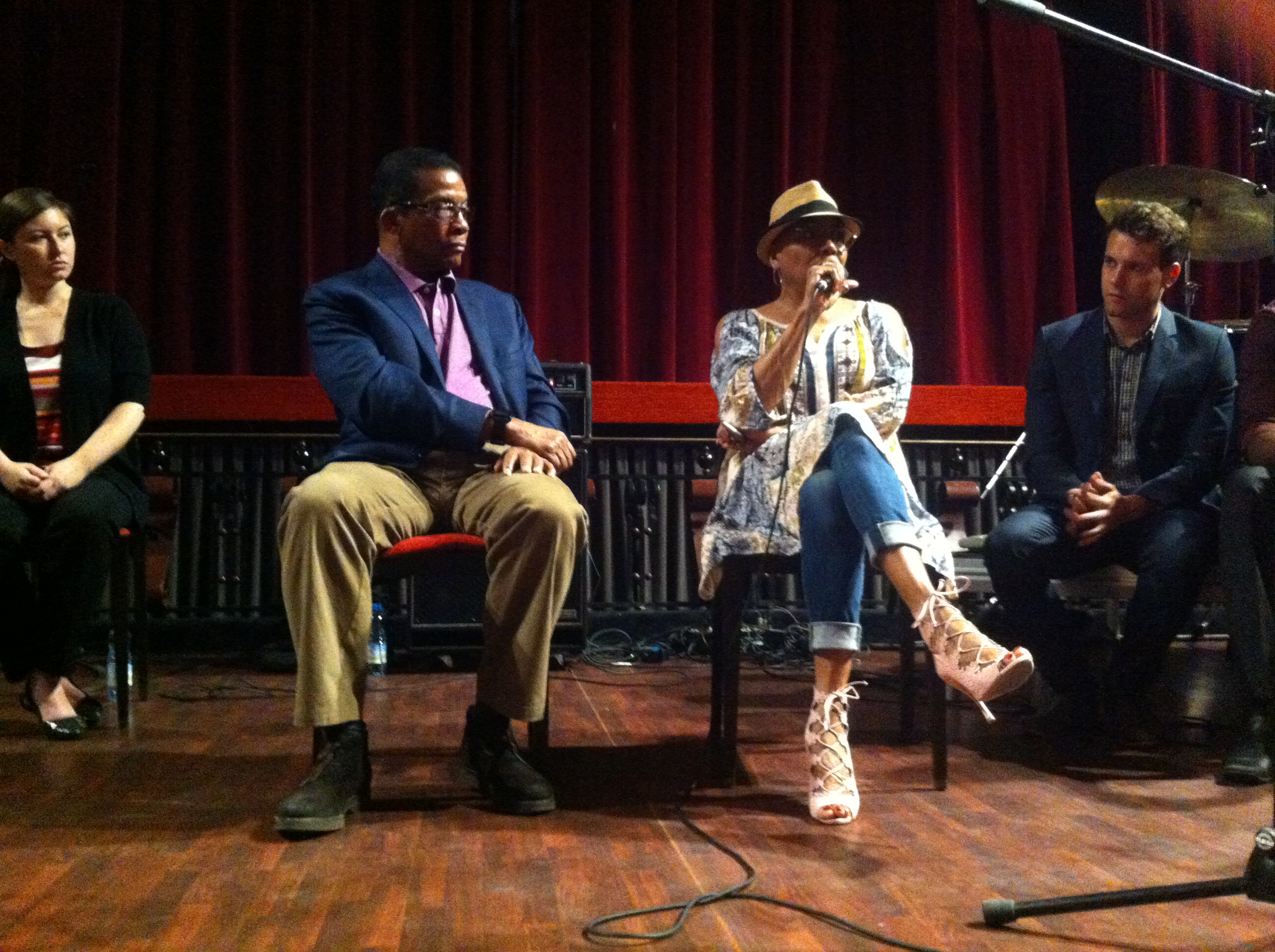
Herbie Hancock and Bridgewater giving a masterclass to musicians in Rabat, Morocco

Her album Red Earth, released in 2007, features Africa-inspired themes and contributions by numerous musicians from Mali. She performed at the San Francisco Jazz Festival (2007). On December 8, 2007, she performed with the Terence Blanchard Quintet at the John F. Kennedy Center for the Performing Arts in Washington, D.C. She tours frequently throughout the world. October 16, 2009, found her opening the Shanghai JZ Jazz Festival, in which she sang tunes associated with Ella Fitzgerald along with Ellington compositions and other jazz standards.

As a Goodwill Ambassador to the United Nations' Food and Agriculture Organization, Bridgewater continues to appeal for international solidarity to finance global grassroots projects in the fight against world hunger. She has also been given honorary doctorates from the University of Michigan and the Berklee College of Music.

In April 2017, Bridgewater was the recipient of an NEA Jazz Masters Award with honors bestowed at the Kennedy Center in Washington, D.C., and in 2018 was awarded the 2018 Maria Fisher Founder's Award by the Thelonious Monk/Hancock Institute of Jazz. Bridgewater was also, in November 2019, inducted into the Memphis Music Hall of Fame.

== Philanthropy ==
Bridgewater has a long history of philanthropy and advocacy. Her appointment as UN Goodwill Ambassador to the FAO, as well as the ASCAP Foundation Champion Award, along with her ongoing work with UNESCO for World Jazz Day coupled with her recognition as a Doris Duke Artist set in motion her founding of The Woodshed Network. Launched in 2019, The Woodshed Network was conceived as a program for Women in Jazz, to provide professional support and accelerate careers through mentorship, knowledge sharing and community interaction. The program is a collaboration between Dee Dee Bridgewater as artistic director, (DDB Productions + DDB Records), Tulani Bridgewater-Kowalski as Co-Artistic Director & Program Curator (Bridgewater Artists Management), and 651 ARTS with funding by the Doris Duke Charitable Foundation. The first year's alumna include Erinn Alexis (sax), Lakecia Benjamin (sax), Darynn Dean (vocals), Sarah Hanahan (sax), Kennedy (vocals), Amina Scott (bass), and Sequoia Snyder (piano). Program mentors included Sheila Jordan, Arthel Neville, Marilyn Rosen (Marilyn Rosen Presents), Alisse Kingsley (Muse Media Public Relations), Maureen McFadden (DL Media), Jett Galindo (The Bakery LA), Shirazette Tinnin, Fanny Delsol (Motema), Simma Levine (NJ PAC), Robin Tomchin (Motema), Stacie Negas (Sony Masterworks), and Lisa Jefferson (LRJ Account Management), with Bridgewater-Kowalski serving as moderator.

== Acting ==
Dee Dee Bridgewater has appeared in such films as the 1979 film The Fish That Saved Pittsburgh and the 1984 film The Brother from Another Planet. She has made a guest appearance in the sitcom Benson and the sci-fi fantasy TV series Highlander: The Series.

Film and television credits include:

- Everybody Rides the Carousel, Stage 7, 1976
- The Fish That Saved Pittsburgh as Brandy, 1979
- Benson as Michelle, 1980
- Another Life as Samantha Marshall, 1982
- Night Partners as Gloria, 1983
- The Wiz as Glinda, the Good Witch of the South (TV version of Broadway Musical), 1983
- The Brother from Another Planet as Malverne Davis, 1984
- Highlander: The Series as Carolyn Lamb in "The Beast Below" (Season 1, Ep.16), 1993
- Falstaff on the Moon (short film), 1993
- Corps plongés (It's Not About Love) as "la femme au verre du lait", 1998
- Go West! A Lucky Luke Adventure as Molly, 2007

== Personal life ==
Bridgewater is the mother to three children, Tulani Bridgewater (from her marriage to Cecil Bridgewater), China Moses (from her marriage to theater, film and television director Gilbert Moses) and Gabriel Durand (from her last marriage to French concert promoter Jean-Marie Durand).

Tulani, her eldest daughter, attended the Mirman School for Gifted Children in Los Angeles, California. She serves as Bridgewater's manager under her firm Bridgewater Artists Management and runs Bridgewater's production company and record label (DDB Productions, Inc. and DDB Records).

Bridgewater's daughter China Moses is a singer, songwriter, producer, and radio broadcaster.

== Awards and honors ==
=== Grammy Awards ===
The Grammy Awards are awarded annually by the National Academy of Recording Arts and Sciences. Bridgewater has won two Grammys with nine nominations.

Year	Work	Category	Label
1989	Live in Paris	Best Jazz Vocal Performance, Female	Nominated
1994	Keeping Tradition	Best Jazz Vocal Performance	Nominated
1995	Love and Peace: A Tribute to Horace Silver	Best Jazz Vocal Performance	Nominated
1997	Dear Ella	Best Jazz Vocal Performance	Won
2000	Live at Yoshi's	Best Jazz Vocal Album	Nominated
2005	J'ai deux amours	Best Jazz Vocal Album	Nominated
2007	Red Earth – A Malian Journey	Best Jazz Vocal Album	Nominated
2010	Eleanora Fagan (1915–1959): To Billie with Love from Dee Dee	Best Jazz Vocal Album	Won
2026	Elemental	Best Jazz Vocal Album	Nominated

=== Other accolades ===
- First American to be inducted into the Haut Conseil de la Francophonie
- Officier dans l’ordre de la Légion d’Honneur Award (France), 25 April 2025, on board French warship Mistral at New Orleans
- Commandeur dans l'Ordre des Arts et des Lettres Award (France)
- Tony Award, Best Featured Actress in a Musical, The Wiz, 1975
- Laurence Olivier Award Nomination, Best Actress in a Musical, Lady Day, 1987
- AUDELCO Award, Outstanding Performance in a Musical-Female, Lady Day, 2014
- ASCAP Foundation Champion Award, 2017
- NEA Jazz Masters, 2017
- Doris Duke Performing Artist Award, 2018
- Thelonious Monk Herbie Hancock Institute of Jazz Maria Fisher Founder's Award, 2018
- German Jazz Trophy – A Life for Jazz Award, Stuttgart Jazz Open, 2019
- Memphis Music Hall of Fame, 2019

== Discography ==
Studio albums

- Afro Blue (1974)
- Dee Dee Bridgewater (1976)
- Just Family (1978)
- Bad for Me (1979)
- Dee Dee Bridgewater (1980)
- Victim of Love (released 1989)
- Keeping Tradition (1993)
- Love and Peace: A Tribute to Horace Silver (1995)
- Prelude to a Kiss: The Duke Ellington Album (1996)
- Dear Ella (1997)
- This Is New (2001)
- J'ai deux amours (2005)
- Red Earth (2007)
- Eleanora Fagan (1915–1959): To Billie with Love from Dee Dee Bridgewater (2010)
- Dee Dee's Feathers (2015)
- Memphis... Yes, I'm Ready (2017)
- Elemental (2025)
