= List of patter songs =

This is a list of some of the best known patter songs.

== Pre-Gilbert and Sullivan ==
- Auber: Le domino noir – "Je suis sauvée enfin"
- Cornelius: Der Barbier von Bagdad – "Bin Akademiker, Doktor und Chemiker"
- Donizetti: L'elisir d'amore – "Udite, Udite, o rustici", middle section (Dulcamara)
- Donizetti: Don Pasquale – "Cheti, cheti, immantinente", final section (duet for Don Pasquale and Doctor Malatesta)
- Glinka: Ruslan and Lyudmila – Farlaf's Rondo «Близок уж час торжества моего» (Farlaf)
- Mozart: Marriage of Figaro – "La vendetta, oh, la vendetta", final section (Bartolo)
- Mozart: Don Giovanni – "Fin ch'han dal vino" (Don Giovanni)
- Mozart: Die Entführung aus dem Serail – "Solche hergelaufne Laffen", especially the final section of the aira (Osmin)
- Mozart: "Clarice cara mia sposa", aria for Tenor, K. 256
- Rossini: Il Barbiere di Siviglia – "Largo al factotum", final section (Figaro); "A un dottor de la mia sorte" (Bartolo)
- Rossini: La Cenerentola – "Sia qualunque delle figlie", final section (Don Magnifico)
- Rossini: "La Danza"
- Rossini: Il viaggio a Reims – "Medaglie incomparabili" (Don Profondo)
- Offenbach: La jolie parfumeuse – "Neighbors Chorus"

== Gilbert and Sullivan ==
- Arthur Sullivan and F. C. Burnand: Cox and Box – "My Master Is Punctual" (Mr. Cox)
- Gilbert and Sullivan (referred to below as "Sullivan"): The Gondoliers – "In enterprise of martial kind" (Duke of Plaza-Toro, with Duchess, Casilda and Luiz)
- Sullivan: The Gondoliers – "Rising early in the morning" (Giuseppe)
- Sullivan: H.M.S. Pinafore – "When I Was a Lad" (Sir Joseph)
- Sullivan: Iolanthe – "Love, unrequited, robs me of my rest" (the "Nightmare song"; Lord Chancellor)
- Sullivan: The Mikado – "As someday it may happen" (Ko-Ko)
- Sullivan: Patience – "If you want a receipt for that popular mystery" (Colonel Calverley)
- Sullivan: Patience – "If you're anxious for to shine" (Bunthorne)
- Sullivan: Patience – "So go to him and say to him" (Bunthorne and Lady Jane)
- Sullivan: The Pirates of Penzance – "I am the very model of a modern Major-General" (Major-General Stanley)
- Sullivan: Princess Ida – "If you give me your attention, I will tell you what I am" (King Gama)
- Sullivan: Ruddigore – "My boy, you may take it from me" (Robin)
- Sullivan: Ruddigore – "Henceforth all the crimes that I find in the Times" (Robin)
- Sullivan: Ruddigore – "My eyes are fully open to my awful situation" (Robin, Despard, and Margaret).
- Sullivan: The Sorcerer – "My name is John Wellington Wells" (J. W. Wells)
- Sullivan: Trial by Jury – "When I, good friends, was called to the bar" (the Learned Judge)
- Sullivan: The Yeomen of the Guard – "I've Jibe and Joke. ... I've wisdom from the East and from the West" (Jack Point)
- Sullivan: The Yeomen of the Guard – "Oh! A private buffoon is a light-hearted loon" (Jack Point)

== After G&S: selected showtunes ==
- Ashman & Menken: "Now (It's Just the Gas)" from Little Shop of Horrors
- Lionel Bart: "Reviewing the Situation" from Oliver!
- Cy Coleman: "Museum Song" from Barnum
- Comden & Green: "If You Hadn't, But You Did" from Two on the Aisle
- Frankel & Korie: "The Revolutionary Costume" from Grey Gardens
- Rupert Holmes: "Both Sides of the Coin" from Drood
- Eric Idle: "You Won't Succeed on Broadway" from Spamalot
- Kander & Ebb: "The Money Song" from Cabaret
- Kander & Ebb: "We Both Reached for the Gun" from Chicago
- George Gershwin: "The Mophams" from Primrose
- George Gershwin: "It Ain't Necessarily So" from Porgy and Bess
- Bock & Harnick: "Tonight at Eight" from She Loves Me
- Jerry Herman: "Penny in My Pocket" from Hello, Dolly!
- Jonathan Larson: "Therapy" from Tick, Tick... Boom!
- Lerner & Loewe: "Why Can't the English?", "I'm an Ordinary Man" and "A Hymn to Him" from My Fair Lady
- Roger Miller: "The Royal Nonesuch" from Big River
- Laurence O'Keefe: "Show You a Thing or Two" from Bat Boy: The Musical
- Cole Porter: "Let's Not Talk About Love" from Let's Face It!
- Stephen Schwartz: "All for the Best" from Godspell
- Sherman Brothers: "Supercalifragilisticexpialidocious" from Mary Poppins
- Stephen Sondheim: "Another Hundred People" and "Getting Married Today" from Company
- Stephen Sondheim: "Now" from A Little Night Music
- Stephen Sondheim: "The Worst Pies In London" and "A Little Priest" from Sweeney Todd
- Stephen Sondheim: "Putting It Together" from Sunday in the Park with George
- Stephen Sondheim: "Mr. Goldstone, I Love You" from Gypsy
- Stephen Sondheim: "Your Fault" from Into the Woods
- Stephen Sondheim: "Franklin Shepard, Inc." from Merrily We Roll Along
- Jeanine Tesori: "The Speed Test" from Thoroughly Modern Millie adapts portions of "My eyes are fully open" from Ruddigore
- Kurt Weill: "Tschaikowsky (and Other Russians)" from Lady in the Dark
- Meredith Willson: "Rock Island (opening sequence)" and "Ya Got Trouble" from The Music Man
- David Yazbek: "Model Behavior" from Women on the Verge of a Nervous Breakdown

== After G&S: selected popular and classical music ==
- Animaniacs: "Yakko's World" (1993), among others
- Barenaked Ladies: "One Week" from Stunt (1998)
- Noël Coward: "Mad Dogs and Englishmen" (1931)
- Charles Ives: "Memories: A. Very Pleasant" (1897)
- Billy Joel: "We Didn't Start the Fire" from Storm Front (1989)
- Tom Lehrer: "The Elements" (1959) uses the tune of the "Major-General's Song"
- Only Murders in the Building: "Which of the Pickwick Triplets Did It?" (2023)
- Phineas and Ferb: "History of the Tri-State Area", "I Really Don't Hate Christmas"
- Reunion: "Life Is a Rock (But the Radio Rolled Me)" (1974)
- Scrubs: "The Rant Song" from the 2007 episode "My Musical"
- Lucky Starr: "I've Been Everywhere" (1959 by Geoff Mack)
- Frank Zappa & The Mothers of Invention: "Let's Make the Water Turn Black" from We're Only in It for the Money (1968)

== Sources ==
- Ainger, Michael (2002). Gilbert and Sullivan – A Dual Biography. Oxford: Oxford University Press. ISBN 978-0-19-514769-8.
- Bradley, Ian (1996). The Complete Annotated Gilbert and Sullivan. Oxford: Oxford University Press. ISBN 0-19-816503-X.
- Eden, David; Meinhard Saremba (2009). The Cambridge Companion to Gilbert and Sullivan. Cambridge Companions to Music. Cambridge: Cambridge University Press. ISBN 978-0-521-88849-3.
- Lister, Linda (2018). So You Want to Sing Light Opera: A Guide for Performers. Rowman & Littlefield. ISBN 978-1-442-26939-2.
- Williams, Carolyn (2010). Gilbert and Sullivan: Gender, Genre, Parody. New York: Columbia University Press. ISBN 978-0-231-14804-7.
