= Philip Kraus =

American opera singer

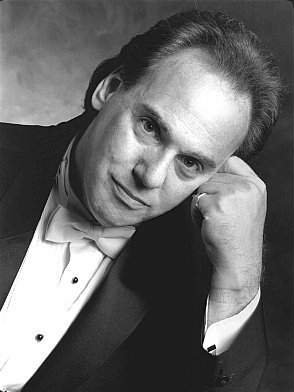
Philip Kraus

Philip Kraus (born November 17, 1950) is an American operatic baritone and stage director known for his performances with the Lyric Opera of Chicago, starting in 1991, and for his co-founding of Light Opera Works, a professional light opera company in Chicago, in 1980.

== Early training ==
Kraus was born in New York City where he received early musical training. As a child, he developed a keen interest in the works of Gilbert and Sullivan. In addition to singing, he also composed music and conducted choirs.

Kraus studied music education at Northwestern University and eventually earned a Doctor of Music in Applied Voice from that institution in 1986. He studied voice with tenor Walter Carringer, choral music with Margaret Hillis, and opera with Robert Gay, a disciple of Boris Goldovsky. He participated in the 1974 American premiere of Sir Michael Tippett's The Knot Garden at Northwestern, singing the role of Mangus.

== Operatic and concert career ==
In 1979, Kraus made his professional debut singing the role of the Vicar in Benjamin Britten's Albert Herring with the Chicago Opera Theater. He later played the title role in Gianni Schicchi with the company. With the Chicago Symphony Orchestra, in 1979, he sang in Handel's Dettingen Te Deum and the Chicago premiere of American composer Russell Woollen's In Martyrium Memoriam. Also in 1979, he recorded the role of Zweiter Gefangene in Beethoven's Fidelio with the CSO, conducted by Sir Georg Solti.

Kraus began a long association as soloist with the Grant Park Concerts in Chicago in 1979, performing Haydn's Mass in Time of War under conductor Thomas Peck. He followed this singing Elgar's The Kingdom, under Leonard Slatkin, in 1981. Kraus went on to sing with other American orchestras, including the Cleveland Orchestra, Dallas Symphony, Milwaukee Symphony Orchestra, and many others, working with conductors Erich Leinsdorf, Eduardo Mata, Zdeněk Mácal, Andrew Davis, James Conlon, David Zinman, Claudio Abbado, James Levine, Lukas Foss, Mark Elder, Anton Coppola, Gisele Ben-Dor, and Marin Alsop. He has been a soloist at the Handel Week Festival in Oak Park, Illinois several times, at Mahlerfest in Boulder, Colorado (2001), and sang Felix Mendelssohn's Elijah in 1996 with New Oratorio Singers.

In 1986, with Chamber Opera Chicago, Kraus played the title role in Falstaff. He joined the roster of the Lyric Opera of Chicago for the 1990 season, and his roles with the company include Jose Castro in La fanciulla del West (1991), Antonio in The Marriage of Figaro (1992), Micah in The Bartered Bride (1993), Alcindoro in La bohème (1993), the Sacristan in Tosca (1994), Elder MacLean in Susannah (1994), various supporting roles in Candide (1994), Amantio di Nicolao in Gianni Schicchi (1996), Southern Senator in Amistad (1997; world premiere, by composer Anthony Davis), Helmsman in Tristan und Isolde (1999), Meyer Wolfshiem in The Great Gatsby (2000), the Mayor in Jenůfa (2000), Abe Kaplan in Street Scene (2001), Ratcliffe in Billy Budd (2001–2002), Baron Douphol in La Traviata (2003), Benoit/Antonio in The Marriage of Figaro (2003), and Harashta in The Cunning Little Vixen (2004). In the company's 2007-08 season, he played Baron Douphol in La Traviata. In 2010, he played Pish-Tush in The Mikado. The Wall Street Journal said that he brought "appropriate snark" to the role. The next year, he was again in La fanciulla del West, this time as Sid. He has played Bartolo in The Barber of Seville more than once for the company. In 2012, he played Le Bailli in Werther. One of his later roles for the company was the Notary in Der Rosenkavalier in 2016.

In 1994 Kraus sang the Vicar in Albert Herring with Cleveland Opera, and in 1995, he sang the title role in Verdi's Rigoletto with Minnesota Opera. He sang the Sacristan in Tosca with Cleveland Opera in 2002. He later joined the roster of the Los Angeles Opera in 2006 singing Baron Duphol in La Traviata in a cast that included Renée Fleming. The production was broadcast by radio station WFMT in Los Angeles. With Los Angeles, he performed in The Bartered Bride. In 2007, Kraus portrayed the composer Antonio Salieri in a concert production of Rimsky-Korsakov's Mozart and Salieri.

== Light Opera Works ==
Kraus, after having been involved with the Northwestern University Gilbert and Sullivan Guild as director, co-founded Light Opera Works in 1980, one of only a few professional companies devoted to the operetta genre in the United States. He served as Artistic Director for 19 seasons directing 38 mainstage productions. Under his artistic direction the company produced Chicago premieres and revivals of Orpheus in the Underworld (1881), The Beautiful Galatea (1982), Naughty Marietta (1983), Utopia, Limited (1984), The Gypsy Baron (1985), The Grand Duke (1992), The Grand Duchess of Gerolstein (1986), Die Fledermaus (1986, 1995), The Chocolate Soldier (1987), Wiener Blut (1989), Babes in Toyland (1993), La Vie parisienne (1984), The Golden Apple (1995), The Czardas Princess (1990) and Emmerich Kalman's little-known The Duchess of Chicago (1998). While Kraus was artistic director, the company also produced stage works of Kurt Weill, including Lady in the Dark (1989), Knickerbocker Holiday (1992), One Touch of Venus (1997) and all of the extant full-length Gilbert and Sullivan comic operas during his tenure with company.

== Director, translator and educator ==
Kraus served as resident stage director for the Pamiro Opera in Green Bay, Wisconsin from 1988 to 1996, directing productions of L'Italiana in Algeri (1988), The Merry Widow (1989), The Daughter of the Regiment (1990),Die Fledermaus (1991), The Magic Flute (1992), La Traviata (1993), Madama Butterfly (1994), Rigoletto (1995), and the world premiere of Gordon Parmentier's The Lost Dauphin (2000), which was videotaped by Wisconsin Public Television for broadcast.

For the Chicago Cultural Center, he directed Poulenc's The Breasts of Tiresias in 2000 and Mozart's The Impresario in 2001 for which he prepared the English translation. At the Lyric Opera Cleveland, he directed Patience, by Gilbert and Sullivan, in 2002, and The Mikado in 2004, in his 1986 Elizabethan concept. In 2017, he directed La Périchole for Tacoma Opera.

Kraus has prepared several English singing translations of operas and operettas in collaboration with lyricist Gregory Opelka. These include Oscar Straus' The Chocolate Soldier and A Waltz Dream and Kalman's The Duchess of Chicago. Other translations include La Serva Padrona, Orpheus in the Underworld, Gianni Schicchi, Suor Angelica, The Coronation of Poppea and The Land of Smiles.

From 1982 to 1987, Kraus served as the Director of the De Paul University Opera Theater in Chicago and taught applied voice at De Paul from 1993 to 1999. From 1999 to 2002 Kraus served as the Director of Opera at Roosevelt University in Chicago. Kraus was a Lecturer at Northwestern University School of music in the opera program beginning in 2005.
