= I'm a Stranger Here Myself: Wainwright Does Weill =

2025 live album by Rufus Wainwright

Live album by Rufus Wainwright and the Pacific Jazz Orchestra
- Released: November 21, 2025
- Recorded: May 2023 – 2024
- Venues: Café Carlyle (New York City); United Artists Theatre (Los Angeles); Hilversum, Netherlands
- Length: 1:08:03
- Labels: Center Stage Records; Thirty Tigers

Rufus Wainwright and the Pacific Jazz Orchestra chronology
Opening Night (2025)	I'm a Stranger Here Myself: Wainwright Does Weill (2025)

I'm a Stranger Here Myself: Wainwright Does Weill is a live album by Canadian-American singer-songwriter Rufus Wainwright and the Pacific Jazz Orchestra, released via Center Stage Records and Thirty Tigers on November 21, 2025. The tribute album commemorates the work of German-born American composer Kurt Weill.

Most of the album, with the exception of two tracks, was recorded at the United Artists Theatre with the Pacific Jazz Orchestra, a Los Angeles-based 40-member orchestral jazz ensemble, in March 2024, following the success of Wainwright's previous tribute concerts to Weill at New York City's Café Carlyle during May 2023. One version of "Surabaya Johnny" was recorded at one of the New York City concerts, while "Lost in the Stars" was recorded in Hilversum, Netherlands, in late 2024 with the Metropole Orkest. Viola Odette Harlow makes a guest appearance on "Zuhälterballade". Chris Walden conducted the Pacific Jazz Orchestra and arranged the songs.

Following the tribute concerts in New York City and Los Angeles, Wainwright and John Legend performed "Mack the Knife" at a dinner during Milan Men's Fashion Week in June 2024. Ahead of the album release, Wainwright's recordings of "Mack the Knife" and "Lost in the Stars" were released as promotional singles in September and October 2025, respectively. "Mack the Knife" also received an official performance video on YouTube. Wainwright has performed songs from the album at solo concerts.

== Background and tribute concerts ==
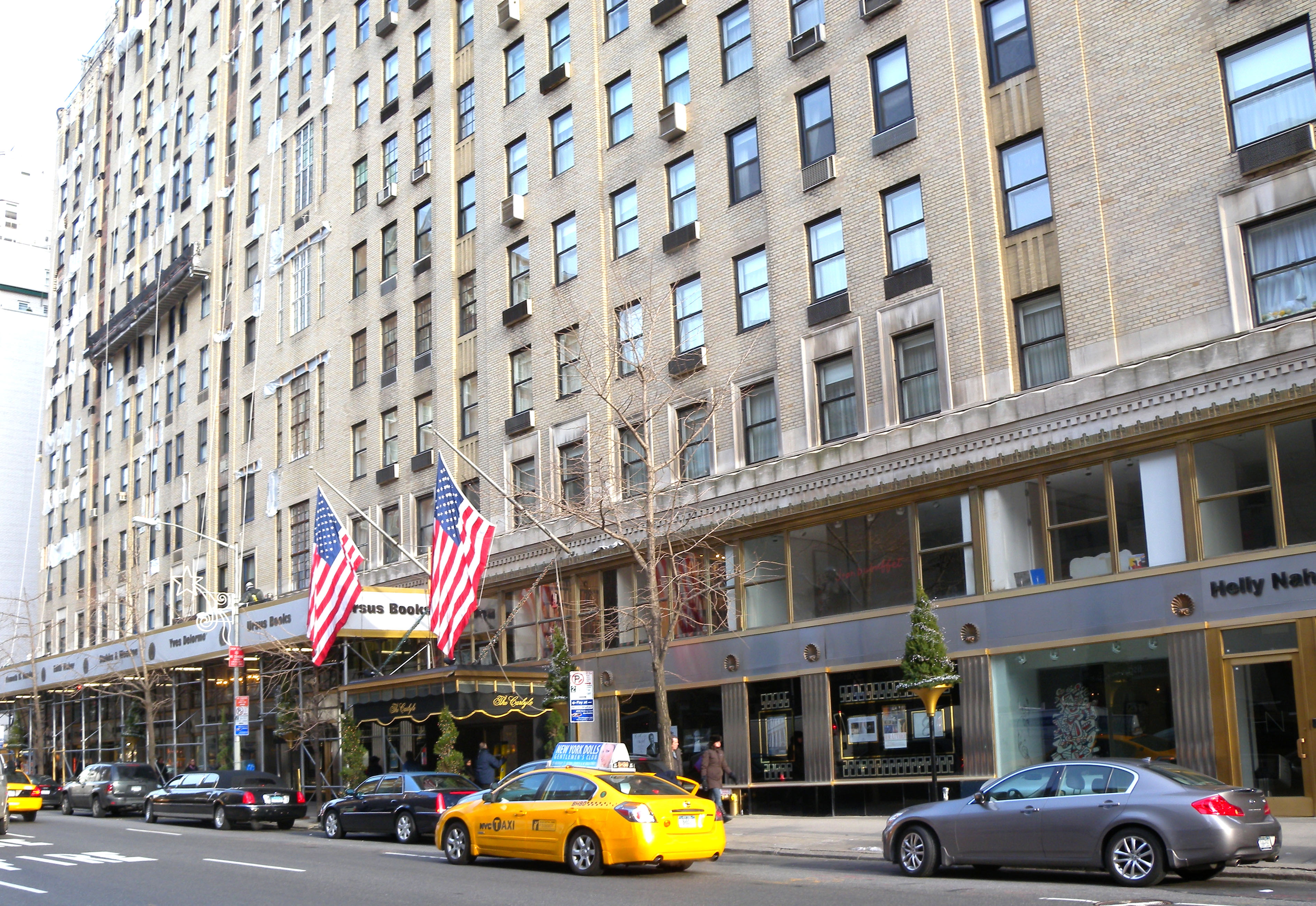
One version of "Surabaya Johnny" was recorded at Café Carlyle in New York City's Carlyle Hotel (exterior pictured in 2009), where Wainwright had a five-night concert residency in May 2023.

Most of the album was recorded at the United Artists Theatre (exterior pictured in 2005) in Los Angeles in March 2024.

German-American composer Kurt Weill has been a longtime inspiration for Wainwright. Wainwright performed songs by Weill at a sold-out, five-night concert residency at New York City's Café Carlyle during May 2023. He was approaching his fiftieth birthday at the time, which also inspired the tribute concerts. In an interview with Curbed, Wainwright said he did not leave his hotel for the first three days of the residency, relying on room service and watching television while eating jelly beans and M&M's.

According to Americana UK, "Wainwright's first deep dive into Weill's repertoire was met with enthusiastic acclaim, prompting an expansion into a fully orchestrated concert." In March 2024, Wainwright performed songs by Weill alongside the Pacific Jazz Orchestra at the United Artists Theatre in Los Angeles, with German composer Chris Walden conducting. Wainwright rehearsed with the full orchestra once ahead of the Los Angeles concert.

== Program and recording ==
For the concert series, Wainwright included political songs and others that "have particularly resonated with Wainwright as he gets older", according to The Independent. He also selected songs to represent three different aspects of Weill's career: his Berlin and United States eras, as well as the composer's French compositions. The songs were arranged by Walden.

Most of the album was recorded during the Los Angeles concert, with two exceptions: one version of "Surabaya Johnny" was recorded in New York City, and "Lost in the Stars" was recorded in Hilversum in late 2024. Greg Cahill of The Absolute Sound said the "high-energy" concert in Los Angeles was recorded "before an appreciative audience".

=== Music ===
The 16-track album opens with "September Song", a song from the 1938 musical Knickerbocker Holiday, with lyrics by American playwright Maxwell Anderson. The title track is from the Broadway musical One Touch of Venus (1943). The third song, "Die Muschel von Margate", is from Léo Lania's play Konjunktur (Oil Boom). "Matrosen Song" is from the 1929 musical Happy End. "It Never Was You" is also from Knickerbocker Holiday. "Youkali" is from the cabaret Marie Galante and the seventh song, "Fürchte Dich Nicht", is also from Happy End. "The Saga of Jenny" was written for the Broadway musical Lady in the Dark (1941) and has lyrics by Ira Gershwin.

The French-language "Je ne t'aime pas" is a 1934 cabaret ballad. The tenth song, "Will You Remember Me?", is also from Knickerbocker Holiday. "Zuhälterballade" features American musician Viola Odette Harlow. The twelfth track, "Surabaya Johnny", is another song from Happy End. On "Mack the Knife", a song written by German playwright Bertolt Brecht for the play The Threepenny Opera (1928), Wainwright sings the first verse in German. "Lost in the Stars" is from the 1949 musical of the same name and features the Dutch orchestra Metropole Orkest, conducted by Simon Dobson. The fifteenth track is a second rendition of "Surabaya Johnny", recorded at Café Carlyle. The closing track is a medley of "My Ship" and "Speak Low", songs written by Gershwin and American poet Ogden Nash for Lady in the Dark and One Touch of Venus, respectively.

== Promotion and release ==
Following Wainwright's tribute concerts in New York City and Los Angeles, he and John Legend (pictured in 2008) performed "Mack the Knife" in Milan in June 2024.

After the tribute concerts in New York City and Los Angeles, Wainwright and American singer and songwriter John Legend performed "Mack the Knife" at the 'Esquire x Ralph Lauren' dinner during Milan Men's Fashion Week in June 2024. Legend played the piano and Wainwright sang the first verse in German, before switching to English.

Ahead of the album's release, "Mack the Knife" was released in September 2025, along with an official video performance available on YouTube. The track "Lost in the Stars" was released in October 2025. Wainwright also performed songs by Weill at solo concerts leading up to the album's release, including "Surabaya Johnny" at the City Winery Philadelphia on October 22, 2025.

The album was released via Center Stage Records and Thirty Tigers on November 21, 2025. English musician and producer Peter Asher wrote the album's liner notes. On December 3, 2025, Wainwright and Walden participated in a panel discussion focused on the album at the Grammy Museum at L.A. Live's Clive Davis Theater. Asher moderated the discussion.

== Reception ==
Professional ratings
Review scores
Source	Rating
AllMusic	4/5 stars
The Arts Desk	3/5 stars
Buzz Magazine	4/5 stars
Rolling Stone Germany	3/5 stars

In a review of the album, Greg Cahill of The Absolute Sound wrote, "Many artists turn to the Broadway songbook at some point in their careers, but for Wainwright, the boards feel like home." Ludovico Granvassu of All About Jazz called the album "one of the artistic high points of 2025" and "nothing less than an album for the ages". AllMusic's Matt Collar rated the album four out of five stars. He said the "more romantic, melancholy songs work especially well" and complimented Wainwright's performances on the non-English songs "Fürchte Dich Nicht" and "Je ne t'aime pas". Collar's review ended, "Wainwright doesn't just do Weill justice, he does so with a passion and élan all his own." Liz Thomson of The Arts Desk rated the album three out of five stars and called Wainwright's performance on the opening number "overly mannered". She said the title track "swings nicely" and opined:

Like all Wainwright's work, I'm a Stranger Here Myself is compelling. One suspects he does not take direction well, which is a pity. Beyond that, a proper liner note (Asher's is little more than a paean to Rufus) would have added immeasurably and it's surprising the singer did not push for one.

David Levesley of Attitude said of Wainwright's choice to perform some parts in German: "one can't help but feel is a nod not just to Weill, but perhaps to Wainwright's husband Jörn Weisbrodt too." According to A. D. Amorosi of JazzTimes, the album "finds Wainwright coursing through Weill's harmonic familiars and a sonic vibe that radiates ardor and fervor, sour German-American jazz and pre-Tin Pan Alley sweetness". Amorosi said the title track, "Je ne t'aime pas", "Will You Remember Me?", and "Lost in the Stars" were "ostentatious", "warily lilting", "forlorn but free", and "aptly dreamy", respectively. Amorosi also said Walden "isn't pushing Germanic oom-pah-pah brassiness or pearl-clutching cabaret as his 40-piece band's default demeanor toward Weill or Wainwright. Everyone here simply oozes into other's sounds, swooning as one, a collective trust fall in a minor-major key." Rolling Stone Germany rated the album three out of five stars.

Brian D'Ambrosio of Americana UK wrote: "Wainwright's commanding voice and theatrical sensibility, combined with the sweeping orchestral arrangements, create a recording that is both reverent and vibrantly alive. By driving new life into Weill's songs, Wainwright demonstrates just how enduring and relevant this music remains." John-Paul Davies of Buzz Magazine rated the album four out of five stars and said "this collection feels more like a record of a concert experience than a substantial album". Davies called "Die Muschel Von Margate" and "Matrosen Song" highlights and wrote about the album as a whole: "The arrangements are beautiful and the orchestral playing swings and soars with the singer's idiosyncratic interpretations ... But how much you enjoy this record will be more to do with how much you like Kurt Weill than Rufus Wainwright, as the singer really does, deservedly, make the songs the stars of the show."

== Track listing ==
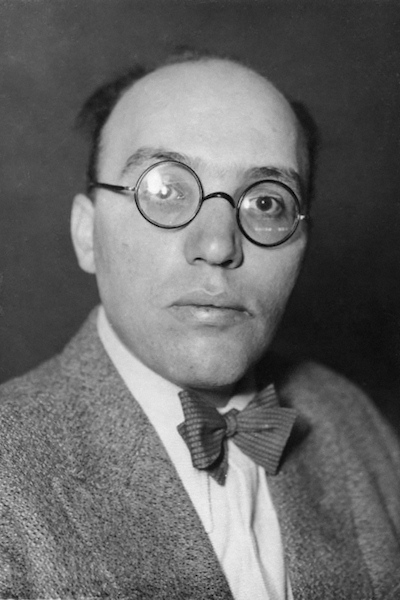
Kurt Weill

No.	Title	Length
1.	"September Song"	4:06
2.	"I'm a Stranger Here Myself"	3:04
3.	"Die Muschel von Margate"	3:42
4.	"Matrosen Song"	8:11
5.	"It Never Was You"	4:18
6.	"Youkali"	5:35
7.	"Fürchte Dich Nicht"	2:30
8.	"The Saga of Jenny"	3:49
9.	"Je ne t'aime pas"	4:00
10.	"Will You Remember Me?"	2:47
11.	"Zuhälterballade" (featuring Viola Odette Harlow)	4:38
12.	"Surabaya Johnny"	6:31
13.	"Mack the Knife"	4:38
14.	"Lost in the Stars" (featuring Metropole Orkest)	4:10
15.	"Surabaya Johnny – Live at Café Carlyle"	6:05
16.	"My Ship / Speak Low"	7:03
Total length:		1:08:03

Track listing adapted from Spotify

== Personnel ==
- Adrianne Pope – violin
- Alex Iles – trombone
- Andrew Martin – trombone
- Andrew McIntosh – trumpet
- Andrew Synowiec – guitar
- Bethany Mennemeyer – violin
- Caleb Jones – cello
- Chad Smith – baritone saxophone
- Charlie Bisharat – violin
- Chris Sorem – engineer
- Chris Walden – arranger, conductor
- Christina Gasparich – assistant engineer
- Daphne Chen – violin
- David Mergen – cello
- Erik Rynearson – trumpet
- Francesco Perlangeli – engineer
- Gayle Levant – harp
- George Hicks – mixing
- Grace Oh – violin
- Hillary Smith – cello
- Ian Sefchick – mastering
- Jacob Scesney – alto saxophone
- Jeff Driskill – alto saxophone
- Jennifer Choi Fischer – violin
- Josh Nelson – organ, piano
- Juliane Gralle – trombone
- Katsuhiko Naito – engineer
- Kirsten Edkins – tenor saxophone
- Kye Palmer – trumpet
- Laura Brenes – horn
- Leah Katz – trumpet
- Linnea Powell – trumpet
- Luanne Homzy – violin
- Mark Cargill – violin
- Michael Stever – trumpet
- Natalie Leggett – violin
- Peter Asher – liner notes
- Ramsey Hampton – trombone
- Ray Monteiro – trumpet
- Sabrina Walden – production manager
- Songa Lee – violin
- Steve Genewick – engineer, mixing
- Tamara Hatwan – violin
- Timothy Loo – cello
- Viola Odette Harlow – vocals
- Wayne Bergeron – trumpet
- Wynton Grant – violin

Credits adapted from AllMusic

== See also ==
- List of 2025 albums
- List of tribute albums
