= I'm a Stranger Here Myself =

I'm a Stranger Here Myself may refer to:

- "I'm a stranger here myself", a line spoken by Groucho Marx in the 1935 movie A Night at the Opera
- "I'm a Stranger Here Myself" (1938), a book by Ogden Nash
- "I'm a Stranger Here Myself" (1943), a song from the musical One Touch of Venus, with lyrics by Ogden Nash
- "I'm a Stranger Here Myself" (1951), a short story by science fiction author Mack Reynolds
- "I'm a stranger here myself", a line spoken by detective Edward Randall in Robert Heinlein's 1959 story The Unpleasant Profession of Jonathan Hoag
- "I'm a Stranger Here Myself", a 1916 short story by Sinclair Lewis, reprinted in the 1962 collection I'm a Stranger Here Myself and Other Stories, by Sinclair Lewis, 1962
- "I'm a Stranger Here Myself: The Story of a Welsh Farm" (1978), a novel by John Seymour
- I'm a Stranger Here Myself: Notes on Returning to America After 20 Years Away (1998), a book by travel writer Bill Bryson
- I'm a Stranger Here Myself: Wainwright Does Weill, 2025 live album by Rufus Wainwright
- Sorry, I'm a Stranger Here Myself (1981–1982), a British sitcom
