= Music Theater Works =

Musical theatre company in Illinois, US

Music Theater Works (formerly Light Opera Works) is a resident professional not-for-profit musical theatre company in Illinois founded in 1980 by Philip Kraus, Bridget McDonough, and Ellen Dubinsky.

The company presented over 75 productions of operetta and musical theatre at Northwestern University's 1,000-seat Cahn Auditorium. Since 1998, in addition to three annual productions, Music Theater Works also produces a fourth, more intimate show, in Northwestern's 450-seat Nichols Concert Hall or the McGall YMCA Children's Center, Second Stage. From 1981 until 2019, Music Theater Works presented 138 productions at these venues.

In 2021, Music Theater Works moved to a residency at the North Shore Center for the Performing Arts in Skokie, Illinois, performing in both the 315-seat thrust North Theatre and the 867-seat Center Theatre. By 2023, it had presented more than 150 productions.

== History ==
Music Theater Works was founded as Light Opera Works in Evanston, Illinois, by Philip Kraus, Bridget McDonough, and Ellen Dubinsky. Kraus was the first Artistic Director of the company, serving from 1981 through 1999. The first production of the company occurred in 1981 with a staging of Gilbert and Sullivan's H.M.S. Pinafore. Under Kraus' leadership, the company's main emphasis in programming centered on American, French and Viennese operetta in English, and Gilbert and Sullivan's Savoy operas. The company produced over 75 productions at Northwestern University's 1,000-seat Cahn Auditorium. From 1998, in addition to its three annual productions, the company has produced a fourth show, in Northwestern's smaller Nichols Concert Hall or the McGall YMCA Children's Center, Second Stage.

Lara Teeter succeeded Kraus and served as Artistic Director until 2004. He continued to program operettas but added more musical theatre pieces from later in the 20th century. Rudy Hogenmiller took over in 2005 and continued that trend. In 2017, the company changed its name from Light Opera Works to Music Theater Works. In 2019, Hogenmiller and founding General Manager Bridget McDonough retired, to be replaced by Kyle Dougan as Producing Artistic Director.

In 2021, Music Theater Works moved to a residency at the North Shore Center for the Performing Arts in Skokie, Illinois, performing in both the 315-seat thrust North Theatre and the 867-seat Center Theatre. In 2023, to celebrate the company's 150th production, The Producers, the Mayor of Skokie issued a proclamation.

== Repertory ==
In its early years, the company staged all twelve of the full-length extant Gilbert and Sullivan operas, including an Elizabethan concept Mikado (1986) and an Edward Gorey/Tim Burton-inspired Ruddigore (1996), as well as the less frequently produced Utopia Limited (1984) and The Grand Duke (1992).

Its repertory also included Emmerich Kálmán's The Duchess of Chicago (1998), Jerome Moross' The Golden Apple (1995), Karl Millöcker's The Beggar Student, Oscar Straus' The Chocolate Soldier (1987) and A Waltz Dream (1992) (both with translations by Kraus and lyricist Gregory Opelka), Victor Herbert's Babes in Toyland (1994) and The Red Mill (1992), and Leonard Bernstein's Wonderful Town (1996). The company embarked on a Kurt Weill cycle in 1989 beginning with Lady in the Dark (1990), and including One Touch of Venus (1997) and Knickerbocker Holiday (1993).

In 1998, the company added a fourth, more intimate, show each year in the 250-seat Second Stage or at Nichols Concert Hall. These have included operettas like The Isle of Tulipitan (2003),new works such as Soup du Jour (2002) and No Way to Treat a Lady (2004), revues like Side by Side by Sondheim (2008), and revivals such as Darling of the Day (2005). At the Nichols Concert Hall at Northwestern University, the company presented The Hunchback of Notre Dame (2019) In 2022, Music Theater Works transitioned from a three show and 1 concert season to one of with all fully staged productions at the North Shore Center for the Performing Arts in Skokie, Illinois, where they produced Zorro.

List of Productions

- 1981: H.M.S. Pinafore; Orpheus in the Underworld
- 1982: The Beautiful Galatea (Die schöne Galathee); Gianni Schicchi; Candide
- 1983: The Pirates of Penzance; A Little Night Music; Naughty Marietta
- 1984: La Vie parisienne; The Merry Widow; Utopia, Limited
- 1985: The Gondoliers; The Gypsy Baron; The Student Prince
- 1986: The Mikado; The Grand Duchess of Gerolstein; Die Fledermaus
- 1987: The Sorcerer; The Chocolate Soldier; Rose-Marie
- 1988: The Land of Smiles; La Périchole; The Desert Song
- 1989: Vienna Life (Wiener Blut); Patience; Lady in the Dark
- 1990: The Gypsy Princess; Princess Ida; The New Moon
- 1991: Bitter Sweet; The Beggar Student; The Red Mill
- 1992: A Waltz Dream; The Grand Duke; Knickerbocker Holiday
- 1993: The Count of Luxembourg; Iolanthe; Babes in Toyland
- 1994: A Night in Venice; The Student Prince; The Most Happy Fella
- 1995: The Pirates of Penzance; The Golden Apple; Die Fledermaus
- 1996: The Chocolate Soldier; Ruddigore; Wonderful Town
- 1997: H.M.S. Pinafore; One Touch of Venus; The Merry Widow
- 1998: The Yeomen of the Guard; The Duchess of Chicago; The Fantasticks (Second Stage); The Desert Song
- 1999: Beautiful Helen of Troy (La Belle Hélène); Rose-Marie; She Loves Me (Second Stage); The Mikado
- 2000: The Gondoliers; Man of La Mancha; Tintypes (Second Stage); The Great Waltz
- 2001: Countess Maritza; Kismet; You Never Know (Second Stage); The Student Prince
- 2002: Gypsy Love; Camelot; Soup du Jour – Opelka, Mueller and Boland (Second Stage); The Pirates of Penzance
- 2003: Ragtime; Fiddler on the Roof; My Night at Jacques – Jacques Offenbach (Second Stage); Die Fledermaus
- 2004: Sweethearts; Candide; No Way to Treat a Lady - Douglas J. Cohen (Second Stage); H.M.S. Pinafore
- 2005: Carnival!; The Merry Widow; Darling of the Day (Second Stage); The Sound of Music
- 2006: South Pacific; 110 in the Shade; Ben Bagley's The Decline and Fall of the Entire World as Seen Through the Eyes of Cole Porter (Second Stage); The Mikado
- 2007: Kiss Me, Kate; Bitter Sweet; Berlin to Broadway with Kurt Weill (Second Stage); Oklahoma!
- 2008: Gigi; Iolanthe; Side by Side by Sondheim (Second Stage); The Music Man
- 2009: A Little Night Music My Fair Lady; C'est la vie (Second Stage); The Pirates of Penzance
- 2010: The Yeoman of the Guard; Carousel; I Do! I Do!; Hello Dolly
- 2011: Brigadoon; The Student Prince; Rodgers & Hart: A Celebration; The Secret Garden
- 2012: Camelot; Man of La Mancha; Operetta's Greatest Hits; Oliver!
- 2013: H.M.S. Pinafore; Cabaret; Gershwin's Greatest Hits; Annie Get Your Gun
- 2014: Damn Yankees; Fiddler on the Roof; Cole Porter's Greatest Hits; The Merry Widow
- 2015: The Fantasticks; South Pacific; Hollywood's Greatest Hits; Guys and Dolls
- 2016: My Fair Lady; Mame; Let Me Entertain You: Jule Styne's Greatest Hits; Fledermaus
- 2017: Candide; Gypsy; Duke Ellington's Greatest Hits; Peter Pan
- 2018: The Pirates of Penzance; Anything Goes; Judy Garland Come Rain or Shine starring Angela Ingersoll; Into the Woods
- 2019: How to Succeed in Business Without Really Trying; The Hunchback of Notre Dame; Lerner & Loewe's Greatest Hits; Joseph and the Amazing Technicolor Dreamcoat
- 2020: No productions due to the COVID-19 pandemic
- 2021: Legends of the 50s and 60s; Mamma Mia!; Ragtime; Billy Elliot the Musical
- 2022: La Cage Aux Folles; The Little Mermaid; Zorro; Camelot; White Christmas
- 2023: Avenue Q; Pippin; The Producers; Brigadoon; Shrek the Musical;
- 2024: The 25th Annual Putnam County Spelling Bee; Carousel; Little Shop of Horrors; Legally Blonde
- 2025: Guys and Dolls; Fiddler on the Roof; Godspell; Annie

== Other activities ==
Music Theater Works is a member of the League of Chicago Theatres and a founding member of Chicago Performances.

The company's youth program is called YouthREACH. REACH stands for Revitalizing Education and Access for Community Health. Its YouthREACH Kids and Teen Companies provide educational performance opportunities; workshops consist of summer or winter camps where kids rehearse and learn from professionals, ending with a final performance.

== Notable people ==
- Alexandra Billings,
- Richard White,
- Sophie Thatcher
- Ginger Minj
- Philip Kraus
- Bridget McDonough
