= Getting Married Today =

Getting Married Today may refer to:

- Getting Married Today (Desperate Housewives)
- Getting Married Today (song)
