= The Chocolate Soldier =

Operetta composed in 1908 by Oscar Straus

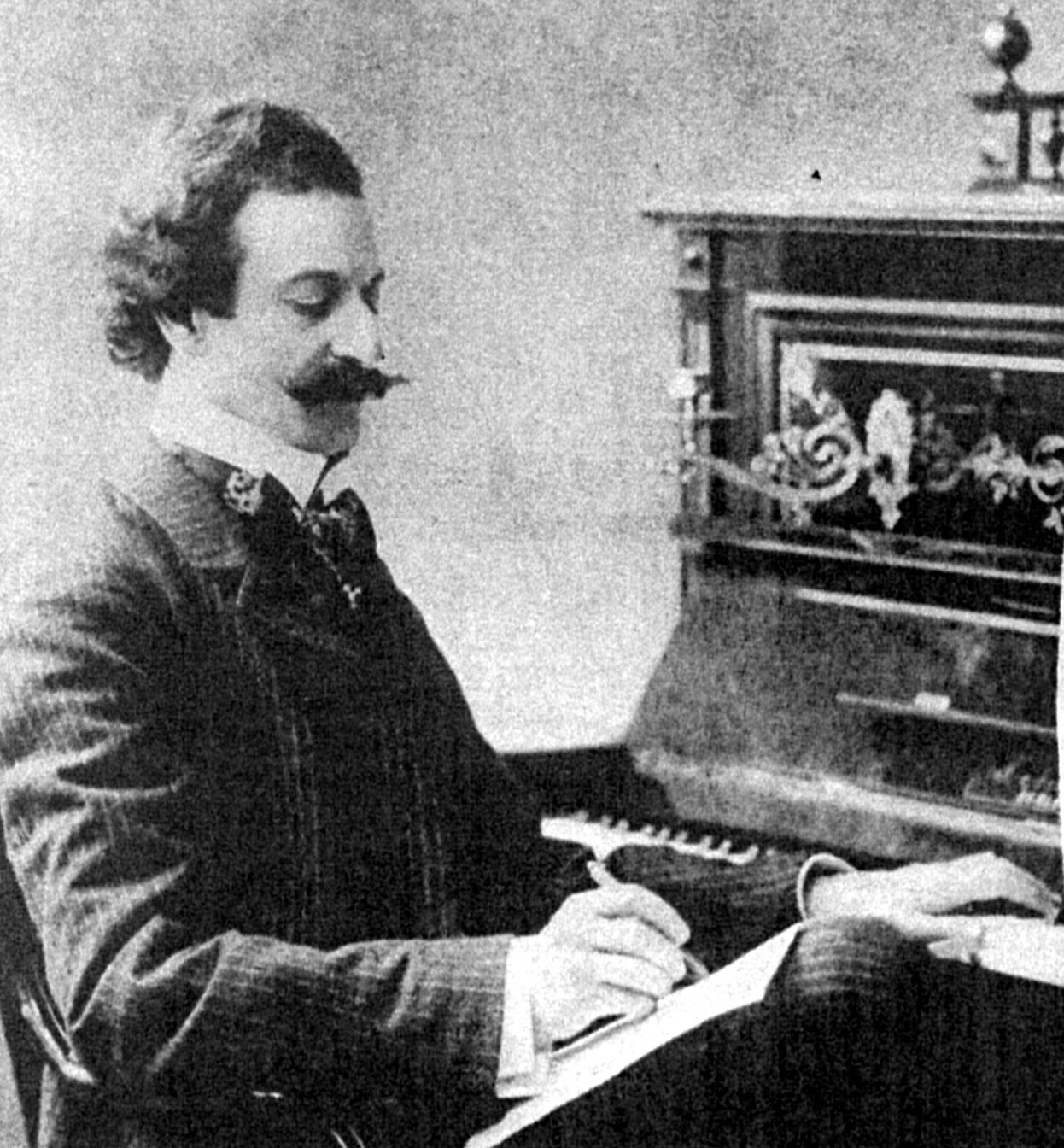
Oscar Straus

The Chocolate Soldier (German: Der tapfere Soldat [The courageous soldier] or Der Praliné-Soldat) is an operetta composed in 1908 by Oscar Straus based on George Bernard Shaw's 1894 play, Arms and the Man. The German language libretto is by Rudolf Bernauer and Leopold Jacobson. It premiered on 14 November 1908 at the Theater an der Wien.

English-language versions were successful on Broadway and in London, beginning in 1909. The first film adaptation was in 1915. The 1941 film of the same name enlists much of Straus's music but is otherwise unrelated, using a plot based on Ferenc Molnár's play The Guardsman.

== Background ==
From the cover of the piano score

When Shaw gave Leopold Jacobson the rights to adapt the play, he gave three conditions: none of Shaw's dialogue, nor any of the character's names, could be used; the libretto must be advertised as a parody; and Shaw would accept no monetary compensation. In spite of this, Shaw's original plot, and with it the central message of the play, remain more or less untouched. The main love aria, for instance, is sung by the heroine just before she meets the "other man", and the "brave" soldier turns out to be a worse coward than his unmilitaristic rival. Shaw despised the result, however, calling it "a putrid opéra bouffe in the worst taste of 1860", but grew to regret not accepting payment when, despite his opinion of the work, it became an international success.

When Shaw heard, in 1921, that Franz Lehár wanted to set his play Pygmalion to music, he sent word to Vienna that Lehár be instructed that he could not touch Pygmalion without infringing Shaw's copyright and that Shaw had "no intention of allowing the history of The Chocolate Soldier to be repeated." Pygmalion was eventually adapted by Lerner and Loewe as My Fair Lady, made possible because they were, at least in theory, adapting a screenplay co-authored by Shaw, with rights controlled by the film company.

== Production history ==
As Der tapfere Soldat, it premiered on 14 November 1908 at the Theater an der Wien, under the baton of Robert Stolz with Grete Holm singing Nadina, and Louise Kartousch as Mascha, where it was a considerable success.

The first English-language version premiered in New York City, translated by Stanislaus Stange, on 13 September 1909, where it was the hit of the Broadway season. It was revived on Broadway in 1910, 1921, 1930, 1931, 1934, and 1947 (with a revised libretto by Guy Bolton). Several of the Broadway revivals starred Charles Purcell in the title role. Its London premiere at the Lyric Theatre in 1910, with C. H. Workman as Bumerli, Elsie Spain as Mascha and Roland Cunningham as Alexius, was also a tremendous success, running for 500 performances. The operetta was adapted as a silent film in 1915.

In 1987, Light Opera Works in Illinois produced and recorded the operetta with a new English translation by its former artistic director, Philip Kraus, and lyrics by Gregory Opelka. In 2002, there was another production at the Kammeroper in Hamburg under Katja Klose and Hans Thiemann. In 2010, it formed part of the program for the Bard SummerScape festival held in Annandale-on-Hudson, New York. In July and August 2012, it was produced by Ohio Light Opera.

== Roles ==
Roles, voice types, premiere cast
Role	Voice type	Premiere cast, 14 November 1908 Conductor: Robert Stolz
Bumerli, a Swiss mercenary	tenor	Herr Werner
Nadina Popoff, a Bulgarian girl	soprano	Grete Holm
Alexius, a Bulgarian soldier, loved by Nadina	tenor	Karl Streitmann
Mascha	soprano	Louise Kartousch
Aurelia	contralto	Frl. Schütz
Popoff	baritone	Max Pallenberg
Massakroff	baritone	Herr Albin

== Synopsis ==
Bumerli in Nadina's bedroom – 1910 London production

=== Act 1 ===
The operetta is set in 1885, near the Dragoman pass. Serbia and Bulgaria are at war, and the wife and daughter of the Bulgarian Colonel Popoff are missing their menfolk – the Colonel himself, and Major Alexius Spiridoff, who is engaged to the daughter, Nadina. Mascha, a young cousin of Nadina who is staying at the Popoff's residence, also hero worships Alexius. Alone in her bedroom, Nadina clutches her sweetheart's photograph and sings of her admiration and love for her "brave hussar" and longs for his return.

An intruder (Bumerli) climbs in through her bedroom window. He is a very ordinary person, nothing like the ideal hero Nadina has been worshipping. In fact he has escaped the battle taking place nearby by climbing the Popoffs' drainpipe. He is in Serbian uniform, but responds to Nadina's patriotic posturing by revealing that he is actually Swiss, and is serving in the Serbian army as a mercenary. When she threatens to call for help he briefly threatens her with his revolver – but soon puts it down. When she picks it up and threatens him he laughs at her – he uses his ammunition pouch to carry chocolates and has no cartridges to load his weapon.

In spite of herself Nadina is amused and charmed by this "Little Chocolate Soldier". He recounts an incident in battle when a foolish Bulgarian officer lost control of his horse, thus leading an inadvertent cavalry charge against Serb guns that happened to have been supplied with the wrong ammunition and were thus overrun. Nadina is furious to realise that the officer concerned was her Alexius, and orders Bumerli to leave at once – when he starts to leave she calls him back. Just in time, as a squad of bumbling Bulgarian soldiers, led by Captain Massakroff, arrive in pursuit. Fortunately Bumerli has had time to hide behind the bed curtains, and Nadina assures them that she has not seen the intruder. While the Bulgarian soldiers search the rest of the house, Aurelia, Nadina's mother, and young Mascha come to the bedroom. They are sure something is going on, and when they spot Bumerli's revolver the secret is out.

By the time the soldiers have left the house and Nadina opens her bed curtains Bumerli is asleep, and the lonely women are all very taken with him. They awaken him with their chatter, but he is exhausted and only wants to go back to sleep again. They ransack the house for civilian clothes to enable him to escape – each, unknown to the others, slipping a photograph of herself into the pocket of his jacket – a favourite house coat of the Colonel's.

=== Act 2 ===
Alexius shows off.

Six months have passed, and the war is over. Outside the Popoff residence the family and servants are welcoming their heroes home. Nadina is delighted to have her Alexius back, but she soon realises that he is far from the hero she imagined, but is boastful and self-centred. When he boasts of the incident of the charge on the guns he is embarrassed to realise that Nadina knows more about the matter than she should. The ladies are embarrassed in their turn when Popoff tells them of a Swiss soldier in the Serbian army that they met after the fighting was over – and who told them a very funny story of escaping from a battle by hiding in a house where he was sheltered by three ladies who all fell in love with him.

The plot thickens as Bumerli himself returns to the scene. He has come to return the clothes he used to escape, and manages to slip them to the ladies without suspicion being aroused. The menfolk are a little puzzled to meet him again, but they invite him to stay for the wedding of Nadina and Alexius. Bumerli manages to get Nadina alone, and confesses that it is his love for her that has drawn him back. He cannot bear to see her married to another, and starts to leave. Heartbroken herself, Nadina asks for her photograph – but Bumerli never looked in the pocket of her father's housecoat – it is still there!

The Colonel is wearing his favourite coat – there is some slapstick as the ladies try to stop him looking in his pocket by finding him matches and a handkerchief. Eventually each of them retrieves a photograph from the pocket – each assuming it is hers. When Nadina goes to return her photograph to Bumerli she finds that it is Mascha's, and that there is a compromising message on the back of it. She flies into a jealous fury that removes all possible doubt that it is Bumerli she really loves.

The guests gather for the wedding ceremony – including Captain Massakroff, who recognises Bumerli as the intruder he saw climb the drainpipe in Act I – in the resulting chaos Mascha produces Nadina's photograph, with its compromising message. Popoff and Alexius are not very bright, but even they start to put two and two together. Alexius is furious with Nadina, and she in her turn declares that she no longer loves him. As the act curtain falls the wedding is definitely off.

=== Act 3 ===
The scene returns to Nadina's bedroom, where she is writing a letter to Bumerli. It is not friendly, as she is still jealous of Mascha. As she finishes the letter, Bumerli himself appears through the window. Nadina gives him his letter, but he does not take it seriously. If she did not love him she would not be so jealous.

Massakroff appears, with a challenge to a duel from Alexius to Bumerli. Bumerli accepts without hesitation, much to Nadina's consternation. Alexius is also terrified – he would never have challenged his rival if he had not been sure he was too much of a coward to accept. It seems Alexius is coming round to the idea he would be happier with Mascha anyway.

Any doubts among the family that Bumerli would not make a good husband for Nadina are dispelled by the revelation that he is the son of a wealthy Swiss businessman, and all ends happily.

== Musical numbers in German version ==
In the original version, after the overture, the music is as follows:

=== Act 1 ===
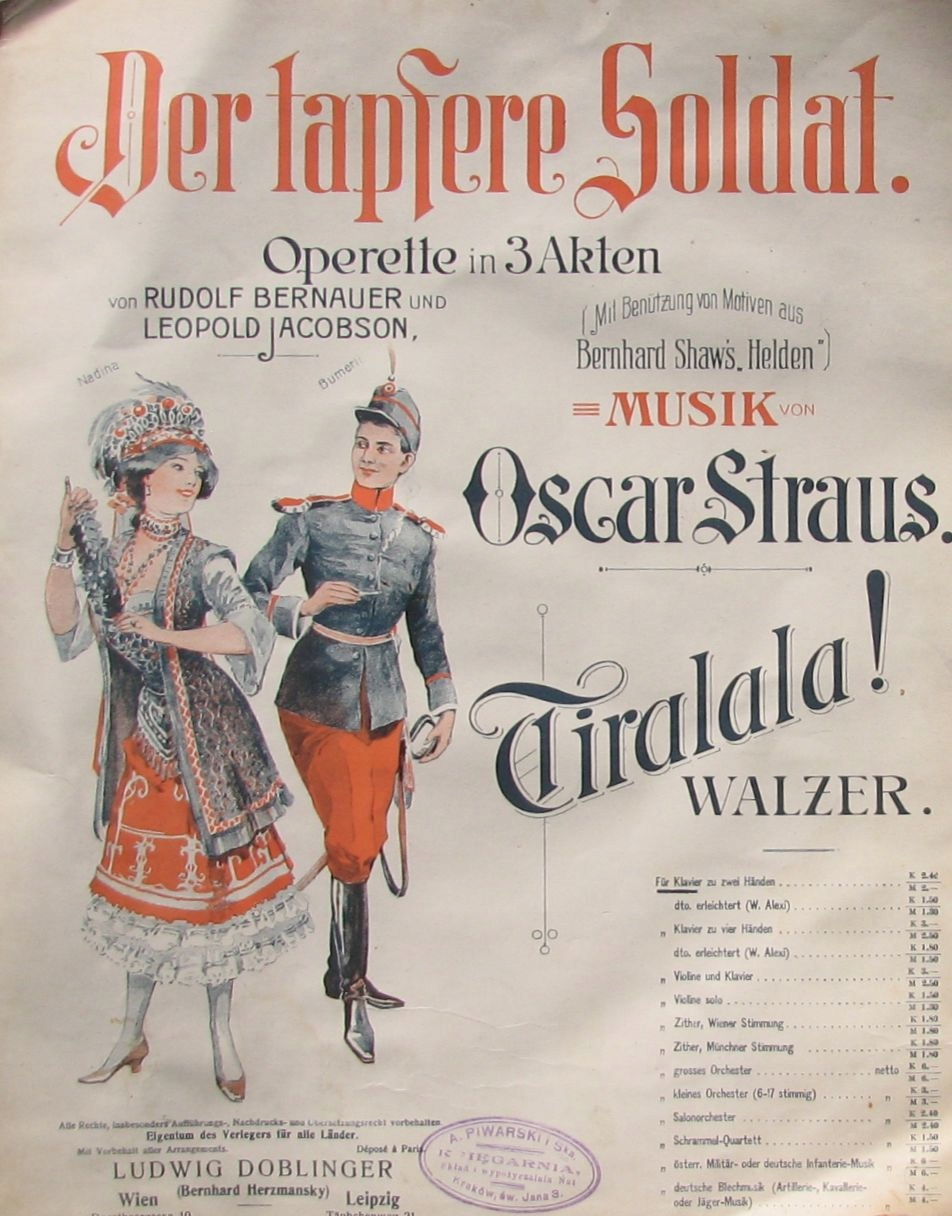
"Tiralala! Waltz", sheetmusic cover

- "Wir marschieren durch die Nacht" ("We march through the night")
- "Mein Held!" ("My Hero!")
- "Wie schön ist dieses Männerbild" ("How handsome is this man")
- "Komm', Komm! Held meiner Träume" ("Come, come! Hero of my dreams")
- "In meinen Leben sah ich nie einen Helden" ("In my life I never saw a hero")
- "Ach, du kleiner Praliné-Soldat" ("Oh, you little praline-soldier")
- "Es ist ein Schicksal, schwer zu tragen; Weil's Leben süss und herrlich ist" ("It is a destiny that is hard to bear; because life is sweet and splendid")
- "Suchet alle Mann, der Serbe nicht entwischen Kann!" ("Every man, search, the Serb cannot escape")
- "Drei Frauen sassen am Feuerherd; Tiralala! (finale)" ("Three women sat at the fireplace; Tiralala! (finale)")

=== Act 2 ===
- "Ein Hoch ein Hoch der Heldenschar!" ("Hail, hail the high band of heroes")
- "Ich bin gewöhnt stets nur zu siegen; Mein Mädchenherz, das schlägt" ("I am used to always winning; my maiden heart is beating")
- "Ich habe die Feinde geschlagen auf's Haupt" ("I have hit the enemy at the top")
- "Ein Jeder hat es schon erfahren; Wenn man so dürfte, wie man wollte" ("Everyone already knows it; if you wish, do as you please")
- "Ach, es ist doch ein schönes Vergnügen" ("Oh, it is a fine joy")
- "Es war einmal ein Fräulein" ("There was once a maiden")
- "Leute, Leute, kommt herbei" ("People, people, come this way")
- "Ich was der Held deiner Träume" ("I was the hero of your dreams")

=== Act 3 ===
- "Mein lieber Herr von Bumerli" ("My dear Lord Bumerli")
- "Pardon! Ich steig' ja nur auf den Balcon!" ("Pardon! I rise only on the balcony!")
- "Du magst dein Köpfchen noch so heftig schütteln; Freundchen, Freundchen nur nicht toben" ("You might have shaken your head, friend, rather than rage")
- "Wenn ein Mann ein Mädchen; Lieber Schwiegerpapa, liebe Schweigermama" ("If a man is a girl; Dear Papa, dear Mama")
- "Ich geb' Dir morgens einem Kuss" ("I give you a morning kiss")

Note: The order and placement of the songs in German differs from the English adaptation (listed below). The English song titles do not use the phrase "hero of my dreams" (German: "Held meiner Träume").

== Musical numbers (English adaptation) ==
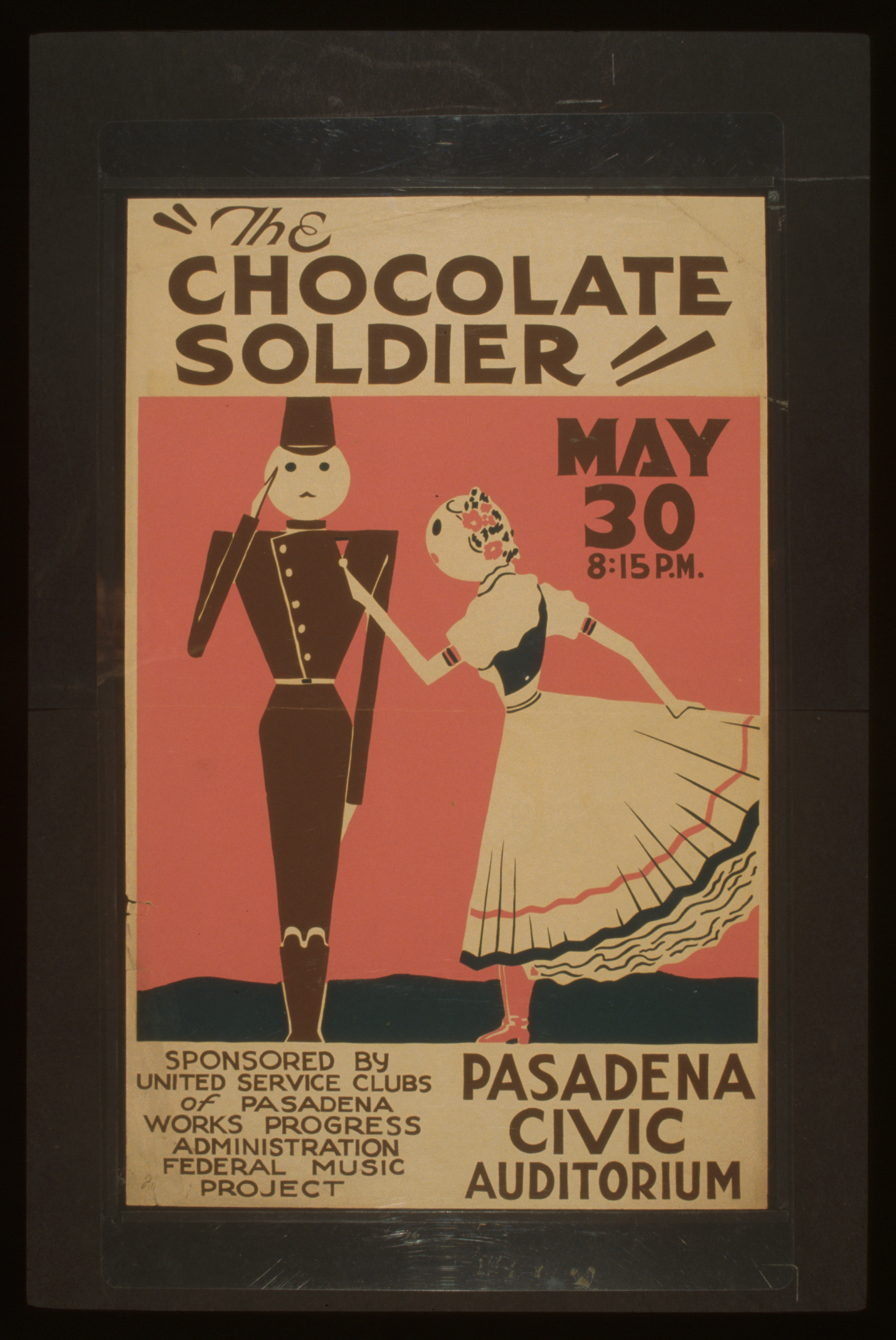
Poster for a California production

=== Act 1 ===
- "We Are Marching Through the Night" – Soldiers
- "We Too, Are Lonely" – Nadina, Aurelia, Mascha
- "We Are Searching for the Foe" – Soldiers
- "What Can We Do Without a Man?" – Nadina, Aurelia, Mascha
- "Say Good Night" – Nadina, Aurelia, Mascha
- "Melodrama" – Nadina, Aurelia, Mascha
- "My Hero" – Nadina
- "Chocolate Soldier" – Bumerli, Nadina
- "Sympathy" – Bumerli, Nadina
- "Seek the Spy" – Massakroff, Nadina, Aurelia, Macha, Bumerli, Soldiers
- Finaletto Act 1 – Nadina, Aurelia, Mascha

=== Act 2 ===
- "The Fatherland Is Free" – Company
- "Alexius the Hero" – Nadina, Aurelia, Mascha, Poppoff, Alexius, Bumerli, Ensemble
- "Never Was There Such a Lover" – Alexius, Nadina
- "The Tale of the Coat" – Nadina, Aurelia, Mascha, Poppoff, Alexius, Bumerli
- "That Would Be Lovely" – Bumerli, Nadina
- Finaletto Act 2 – Nadina, Aurelia, Mascha, Poppoff, Alexius, Bumerli, Ensemble

=== Act 3 ===
- Opening Chorus – Ensemble
- "Falling in Love" – Alexius, Mascha
- "The Letter Song" – Nadina
- "Melodrama" – Bumerli
- "The Letter Song" (reprise) – Bumerli, Nadina
- Finale – Company

The operetta was continually reworked during Straus's lifetime. Among the songs that were dropped were "Why Is It Love Makes Us Feel Queer?", "My Hero", "Thank the Lord the War Is Over", "Sympathy", "Seek the Spy", "Tiralala", "The Chocolate Soldier", and "Forgive".

== Recordings ==
In English – Lehman Engel and his Orchestra

- Conductor: Lehman Engel
- Principal singers: Risë Stevens, Robert Merrill, Jo Sullivan, Peter Palmer
- Recording date: 1958
- Label: RCA Living Stereo – LSO 6005

In German – WDR Sinfonieorchester Köln

- Conductor: Siegfried Köhler
- Principal singers: John Dickie, Johannes Martin Kränzle, Caroline Stein, Helmut Berger, Martina Borst
- Recording date: 1993
- Label: Capriccio Records – 5089

In English – Ohio Light Opera Orchestra

- Conductor: J. Lynn Thompson
- Principal singers: Boyd Mackus, Elizabeth Peterson, John Pickle, Suzanne Woods
- Recording date: 1999
- Label: Newport Classic – NPD 85650 (CD)

== Adaptations and song covers ==
Metro-Goldwyn-Mayer wished to make a filmed version of The Chocolate Soldier in 1940, but they were refused permission (or at least permission at a reasonable price) by Shaw. Instead, Louis B. Mayer bought the rights to Straus's music, and used the plot from Ferenc Molnár's play Testőr (also known as Playing With Fire and Where Ignorance is Bliss, and ultimately adapted by Philip Moeller as The Guardsman) as the plot of a 1941 film, The Chocolate Soldier, starring Nelson Eddy and Risë Stevens. The plot concerns the jealousy of a Viennese couple, Maria and Karl Lang. To test her loyalty, Karl masquerades as a Russian guardsman and tries to seduce Maria. Complications ensue. The film includes the following non-Straus selections:

- "Mon cœur s'ouvre à ta voix" from Camille Saint-Saëns's Samson and Delilah
- "Evening Star" from Richard Wagner's Tannhäuser
- "Song of the Flea" by Modest Mussorgsky
- "While My Lady Sleeps" by Bronisław Kaper

A one-hour radio adaptation, with John Barclay as Bumerli, Gladys Swarthout as Nadina, and Nathaniel Shilkret conducting the orchestra, was broadcast in the US on May 22, 1934, on the popular program Palmolive Beauty Box Theater. A 1955 television film adaptation also starred Stevens, with Eddie Albert.

Nadina's aria, "My hero", has been performed by various singers. It was used in the 1950 film Two Weeks with Love, sung by Jane Powell. In 1955, actress Vivian Vance sang the song in the fourth-season episode of I Love Lucy titled "Ethel's Home Town". It was Troy Shondell's first single in 1958.
