= Patter song =

Song form

Major-General's Song
George Baker sings the "I am the very model of a modern Major-General", conducted by George W. Byng (1920)

The patter song is characterised by a moderately fast to very fast tempo with a rapid succession of rhythmic patterns in which each syllable of text corresponds to one note. It is a staple of comic opera, especially Gilbert and Sullivan, but it has also been used in musical theatre and elsewhere.

The lyric of a patter song generally features tongue-twisting rhyming text, with alliterative words and other consonant or vowel sounds that are intended to be entertaining to listen to at rapid speed. The musical accompaniment is lightly orchestrated and fairly simple, to emphasise the text. The song is often intended as a showpiece for a comic character, usually a bass or baritone. The singer should be capable of excellent enunciation while singing quickly to perform the song to maximum effect.

== History ==
=== Etymology ===
The word "patter" derives from the Pater Noster, or Lord's Prayer, "which Catholics recited in its original Latin. The habit of rushing through the words as quickly as possible gave rise to the term in England."

=== Origins ===
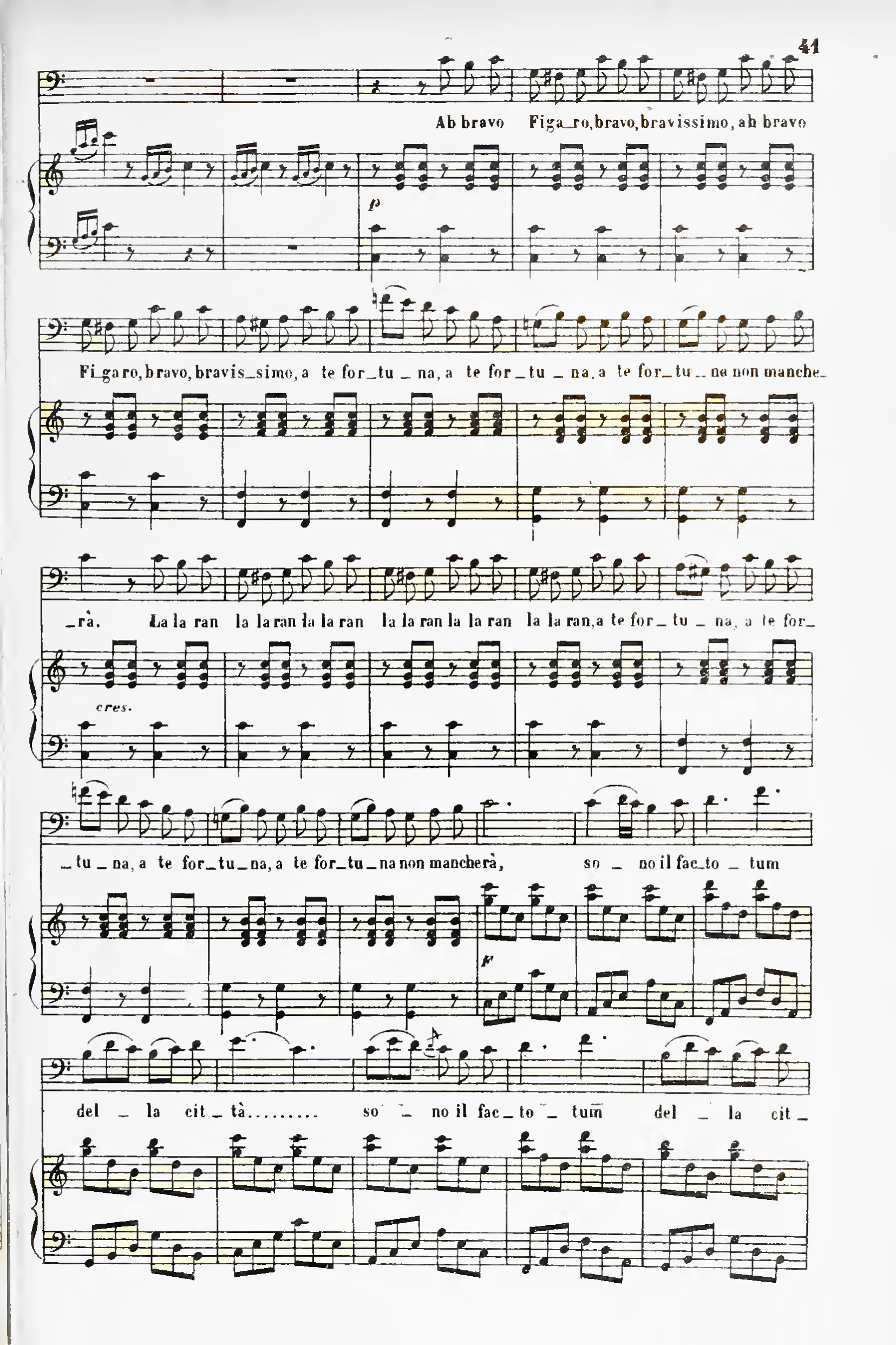
Patter section of Rossini's "Largo al factotum"

A form of rapid patter occurred in the parabasis in ancient Greek comedies. The 16th-century French composer F. de Lys published a song "Secouhez moy" set in what the Grove Dictionary of Music and Musicians calls "a syllabic, patter-song manner". Rapid patter numbers are heard in Italian opera of the baroque era, specifically opera buffa. Alessandro Scarlatti's 1702 opera Tiberio imperatore d'Oriente contains an early instance in the duet "Non ti voglio". In the view of Grove, syllabic patter songs were among the components of the new comic idiom, developed in the early decades of the 18th century by composers including Pergolesi, Leo, Sarro, Hasse and Orlandini, and they became a basic part of the pre‐classical operatic style.

Patter was used sparingly until the second half of the 18th century, but then became an increasingly familiar feature of comic operas. An example is Bartolo's "La vendetta" in Act 1 of Mozart's The Marriage of Figaro, which contains the tongue-twisting "Se tutto il codice" section near the end. Patter numbers are found in the comic operas of Mozart's contemporaries, Haydn, Logroscino, Piccinni and Paisiello. In 19th century operas patter is prominent in the works of Rossini and Donizetti. In their works, the patter is reserved for the cabaletta section of a multi-part number. The best-known examples are:

- the "Tutti mi chiedono" section of Figaro's "Largo al factotum" in Act 1 of Rossini's The Barber of Seville (1816) and the "Signorina, un'altra volta" section in Bartolo's "A un dottor della mia sorte" in the same act;
- the end (starting at "Mi risveglio a mezzogiorno") of Don Magnifico's "Sia qualunque delle figlie" in Act 2 of Rossini's La Cenerentola (1817) and the whole of the short sextet "Quello brontola e borbotta" in the same act; and
- the last section of each of Pasquale's and Malatesta's verses in their duet "Cheti, cheti, immantinente" in Act 2 of Donizetti's Don Pasquale (1843), plus a reprise in which they sing their patter simultaneously.

The musical scholar Gervase Hughes points to the patter number "Bin Akademiker" in Peter Cornelius's The Barber of Bagdad (1858) as a prototype of the later Gilbert and Sullivan model.

=== Gilbert and Sullivan ===
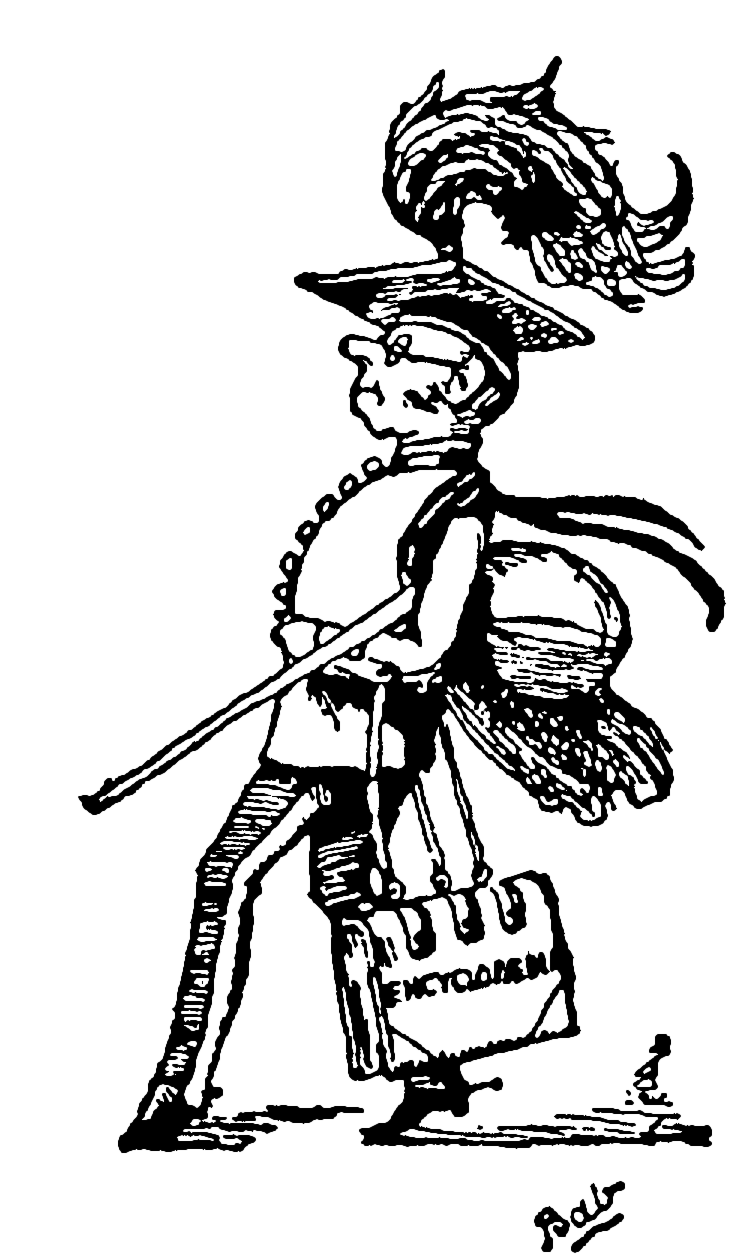
The Major-General (a patter-singing character in The Pirates of Penzance by Gilbert and Sullivan) depicted in a drawing by W. S. Gilbert

W. S. Gilbert wrote several opera parodies before he moved on to comic operas with Arthur Sullivan. Sullivan was also familiar with Italian opera and included a patter song in his first comic opera, Cox and Box (1867). George Bernard Shaw, in his capacity as a music critic, praised "the time-honored lilt which Sir Arthur Sullivan, following the example of Mozart and Rossini, chose for the lists of accomplishments of the Major-General in The Pirates or the Colonel in Patience." Well-known examples of rapid-fire, tongue-tripping Gilbert and Sullivan patter songs are:

- Major-General Stanley's song, "I am the very model of a modern Major-General" in Act 1 of The Pirates of Penzance (1879);
- the Lord Chancellor's "Nightmare song", "When you're lying awake" in Act 2 of Iolanthe (1882);
- the Sorcerer's song, "My Name is John Wellington Wells" in Act 1 of The Sorcerer (1877);
- the trio "My eyes are fully open to my awful situation" in Act 2 of Ruddigore (1887), which contains the lines "This particularly rapid, unintelligible patter/ Isn't generally heard, and if it is, it doesn't matter"; and
- the Colonel's song "If you want a receipt for that popular mystery" in Act 1 of Patience (1881).

Some numbers in the Gilbert and Sullivan canon are classified as patter songs by aficionados, although they may not contain all of the attributes listed in the definition above. These are often songs telling how the character rose to an undeserved distinguished position, or they may contain a catalogue or list. A similar example is found in the middle section, starting “È questo l'odontalgico”, of Doctor Dulcamara's "Udite, Udite, o rustici" in Act 1 of Donizetti's L'elisir d'amore (1832), a work that Gilbert had burlesqued early in his career in Dulcamara, or the Little Duck and the Great Quack. This was not intended to be sung at great speed and is thus more of a precursor of, for example, "When I, good friends, was called to the bar" (Trial by Jury) or "As some day it may happen" (The Mikado), than are the examples of the "rapid-fire" patter above. Most of the Gilbert and Sullivan patter songs are solos for the principal comedian in the cast and were originally performed by George Grossmith. Anna Russell's "How to write your own Gilbert and Sullivan Opera" contains an affectionate parody of a Gilbert and Sullivan patter song.

=== Later ===
Apart from Gilbert and Sullivan tunes set to different words, such as Tom Lehrer's listing of the chemical elements to the tune of the Major General's Song, later patter songs can be found in early twentieth-century operettas, such as Edward German's Merrie England and in a number of musicals. Later examples include "Tschaikowsky (and Other Russians)" in Ira Gershwin and Kurt Weill's Lady in the Dark; "Getting Married Today" in Stephen Sondheim's Company; and "Ya Got Trouble" in Meredith Willson's The Music Man.

== See also ==
- List of patter songs
- Patter
- Catalogue aria
- Rapping
- Sprechgesang
