= Walter Carringer =

American opera singer

Walter Carringer (September 5, 1924 – October 22, 2006) was an American classical tenor who had an active career in operas, concerts, and recitals during the 1950s and 1960s. He was twice the recipient of the Martha Baird Rockefeller Foundation award and was a winner of the American Federation of Music Clubs singing competition. He also was twice awarded the Orpheus Award by Phi Mu Alpha Sinfonia for "significant and lasting contributions to the cause of music in America."

== Biography ==
Born in Knoxville, Tennessee, Carringer grew up in Murphy, North Carolina and was highly active as a Boy Scout in his youth. He served for two and a half years in the United States Army during World War II from 1943 to 1946. During his time of service his superior officers noticed his singing abilities and arranged for him to perform in bond selling tours and in United Service Organizations shows to entertain his fellow troops. He served in Europe for a time and upon the conclusion of the war, entered the music school at Columbia University in 1947 where he earned a bachelor's degree in vocal performance in 1950.

In his senior year of college, Carringer began performing as a soloist on tour with the Robert Shaw Chorale. He became a member of the choir after graduating, often being chosen by Shaw to perform as a tenor soloist in addition to singing in the tenor section. After three and a half years with the ensemble, he left the choir to pursue a solo career in 1953.

Over the next two decades Carringer racked up an impressive list of performance credits as a concert soloist. During his career he assailed almost all of the major oratorio tenor roles. By 1970 he had performed in concerts in every state in the US, with the exception of Hawaii and Nevada. He found his chief successes in concert performances of Handel oratorios and works by Bach, often appearing as a soloist with the Oratorio Society of New York. Highlights of his career included appearances with the Pittsburgh Symphony (1962–1965), the Boston Symphony Orchestra (1963), and the Casals Festival (1964). He also made appearances with the Philadelphia Orchestra at the Bethlehem Bach Festival. He notably performed in a number of United States premieres, including Lukas Foss’ A Parable of Death, Gerald Finzi's Intimations of Immortality, Hector Berlioz's Lelio (Pittsburgh Symphony under William Steinberg), Dmitri Shostakovich’s Song of the Forests and Georg Frideric Handel's The Triumph of Time and Truth.

Although primarily a concert tenor, Carringer did occasionally appear in operas; most notably appearing at the New Orleans Opera in 1962. His biggest operatic successes were had in concert performances of operatic works. He appeared in several concert performances of operas at Carnegie Hall, most notably singing Mitrane in the American Opera Society's performance of Gioachino Rossini's Semiramide with Joan Sutherland and Marilyn Horne.

In 1964, Carringer was appointed to the vocal music faculty at Northwestern University. He worked there for 24 years, teaching several notable singers like Philip Kraus. He was honored with the title of professor emeritus upon his retirement in 1988.

== Sources ==
- Biography of Walter Carringer at bach-cantatas.com
