= One Touch of Venus (film) =

1948 film by William A. Seiter

- Theatrical release poster
- Directed by: William A. Seiter
- Screenplay by: Harry Kurnitz; Frank Tashlin
- Based on: One Touch of Venus by: S. J. Perelman; Ogden Nash
- Produced by: Lester Cowan
- Starring: Robert Walker; Ava Gardner; Dick Haymes; Eve Arden; Olga San Juan; Tom Conway
- Cinematography: Franz Planer
- Edited by: Otto Ludwig
- Music by: Ann Ronell
- Production company: Artists Alliance
- Distributed by: Universal-International
- Release dates: August 1948 (United States); October 28, 1948 (New York City)
- Running time: 82 minutes
- Country: United States
- Language: English

One Touch of Venus is a 1948 American musical romantic comedy film directed by William A. Seiter and starring Robert Walker, Ava Gardner, Dick Haymes, Eve Arden, Olga San Juan, and Tom Conway. The screenplay by Harry Kurnitz and Frank Tashlin is based on the 1943 Broadway musical with a book by S. J. Perelman and Ogden Nash, music by Kurt Weill, and lyrics by Nash. However, the film omits most of Weill's music. The actors did their own singing except for Gardner, whose singing was dubbed by Eileen Wilson. The plot is from an original 1885 novella by Thomas Anstey Guthrie.

In 1945, Mary Pickford announced that she would produce a film version of this musical with the Broadway cast, including Mary Martin, filmed in Technicolor, directed by Gregory La Cava, and released by United Artists. However, Martin became pregnant and Pickford sold the rights to Lester Cowan at Universal in August 1947. Ann Ronell, Cowan's wife, wrote the additional music that replaced much of Weill's material. It was later loosely remade into Goddess of Love (1988).

== Plot ==
Wealthy department-store mogul Whitfield Savory II buys a statue of Venus for $200,000. He plans to exhibit it in the store. Eddie Hatch, a window dresser, kisses the statue on a whim. To his shock, Venus comes to life. She leaves the store and Eddie is accused of stealing the work of art. Nobody believes the truth, including Savory's right-hand woman, Molly Stewart, and Kerrigan, a detective he hires. Venus turns up at Eddie's apartment, forcing him to hide her from girlfriend Gloria and roommate Joe.

Entranced by a Venus song of love, Joe falls for Eddie's girl Gloria. At the store, meanwhile, Venus has fallen asleep on a sofa and is discovered there by Whitfield, who is instantly smitten. Kerrigan decides it's time for Eddie to be placed under arrest for the statue's theft. To rescue Eddie, Venus leads Whitfield on, but a threat by Molly to leave him causes him to realize it's Molly he truly loves. Venus is called home by Jupiter and must return to Mount Olympus, so she returns to her pedestal. Whitfield can now display his work of art to the public. Eddie is the only one left alone, at least until he meets a new salesgirl who is a dead ringer for the goddess of love.

== Cast ==
- Robert Walker as Eddie Hatch
- Ava Gardner as Venus/Venus Jones
- Dick Haymes as Joe Grant
- Eve Arden as Molly Stewart
- Olga San Juan as Gloria
- Tom Conway as Whitfield Savory
- James Flavin as Kerrigan
- Sara Allgood as Landlady

== Venus statue ==
To achieve a realistic-looking living statue, the studio sent Ava Gardner to sculptor Joseph Nicolosi. Gardner posed in a bikini but the drape of the top seemed wrong to the sculptor, so Gardner removed her bikini top and Nicolosi continued with his sculpture. Nicolosi was not aware that the sculpture had to resemble a Venus in Roman robes, and when he presented the work to the studio he was forced to change it accordingly for the film. However, the studio had 12-inch tall copies of the second sculpture made in Bakelite and presented them as promotional items to theater owners and members of the media.

== Song list ==
1. "Don't Look Now But My Heart is Showing" – played over opening credits and sung by a chorus
2. "Speak Low" – sung by Ava Gardner (dubbed by Eileen Wilson) and Dick Haymes
3. "That's Him" – sung by Ava Gardner (dubbed by Eileen Wilson), Olga San Juan and Eve Arden
4. "Don't Look Now But My Heart is Showing" (reprise) – sung by Dick Haymes, Olga San Juan, Robert Walker, Ava Gardner (dubbed by Eileen Wilson) and chorus
5. "Speak Low" (reprise) – sung by Ava Gardner (dubbed by Eileen Wilson)
