= David Nowakowsky =

Russian composer

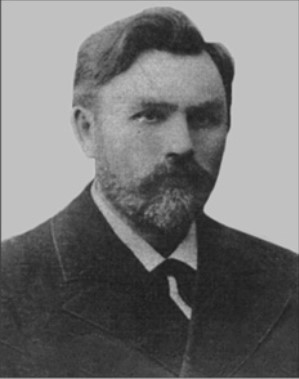
David Nowakowsky

David Nowakowsky (1848-1921) was a Russian/Ukrainian Jewish composer, choirmaster and music teacher. Along with several contemporaries, Nowakowsky integrated traditional Jewish liturgical modes with western harmonies and styles, reinvigorating music for the synagogue. He was also noted as the music director and choirmaster of the Brody Synagogue in Odessa for 50 years. His work is not well known today although he is mentioned in Ira Gershwin's song, Tschaikowsky (and Other Russians).

== Early life ==
Nowakowsky was born in Malyn in Ukraine in 1848, part of the Machnovska. Little of his early life is known, although there are several stories that survive. At 8 he left home, apparently due to the hounding of his stepmother, to sing in a trio with a cantor in the nearby town of Khmilnyk. He was later orphaned and joined the choir of cantor Spitzberg in Berditchev. He also studied traditional Jewish liturgical modes with cantor Yerucham (HaKaton) Blindman, and organ, theory and counterpoint at the Conservatory in Berdychiv.

== Life in Odessa ==
In 1869 Nowakowsky was offered the post of assistant conductor to Nissim Blumenthal at the newly built Brody Synagogue in Odessa, and to instruct in the choir school that Blumenthal had established.

Blumenthal had experimented with the use of western songs and the German language with traditional Jewish choruses. For instance, he used Handel's "Hallelujah" chorus from The Messiah sung to the words of Psalm 113: “"Halleluhu: hallelu avdei adonai" ("Praise the Lord, O servants of the Lord").

Nowakowsky followed this concept but used Hebrew instead, adapting Felix Mendelssohn's Opus 91 setting of Psalm 98 for his chorus. This led to some fame for the synagogue, which was often visited by non-Jews simply to listen to the music. Their use of organ during services was soon picked up by larger synagogues, whose members were visiting Brody.

In 1891 Pinchas Minkowsky replaced Blumenthal at Brody, and started to showcase Nowakowsky's own compositions. It was Minkowsky who first proclaimed Nowakowsky a genius, lauding the composer in his own autobiography of 1924, writing that Nowakowsky "never resorted to 'lemonade music,' with cadenzas from Italian opera, as they do in America." During his time at Brody, Nowakowsky also taught music at the Odessa Orphan Asylum as well as three other music schools, and later became a Professor of Theory and Harmony at the People's Conservatory of Odessa.

With the opening of the pogroms in 1881, the position of the Jewish population in Odessa steadily declined. Minkowsly fled to the US in 1905, but Nowakowsky remained. Nowakowsky died on 25 July 1921, "deserted and poor", none of his major works having been published. He left five children: Leo, Solomon, Carolina, Rosa, and Dora. His wife is not recorded.

== Preservation of his works ==
The pogroms of the earlier years would prove minor in comparison to what was to follow under the Bolsheviks. By 1924, with the city in a state of chaos, his daughter Rosa smuggled his works to her own daughter, Sophia, who was living in Berlin. Meanwhile the Brody Synagogue was forced to closed, and converted into the town's archives. Nowakowsky was included, in a three line entry, in the Nazi Lexikon der Juden in der Musik. In 1937 Sophia moved 3,500 pages of Nowakowsky's papers to a relative's home in Strasbourg.

Sophia, herself a concert pianist, attempted to leave Germany, and the family moved about on travel visas. In 1939 Sophia's husband, Boris, was able to obtain Romanian passports for the family, and they moved to the French village of Collonges-sous-Salève on the Swiss border just outside Geneva, taking Nowakowsky's papers with them.

When Vichy France was overrun in 1943, Sophia and their son Alexandre fled to Switzerland. Boris first managed to save the works by burying them at a farm near Archamps, La Ferme Chosal. According to Berg, they were placed in two ammunition cases and buried under a dung heap. The collection was brought to the US in 1952 when Alexandre won a scholarship to Columbia University, and found a permanent home in the Hebrew Union College School of Sacred Music in New York in 1955.
