= The Saga of Jenny =

Song by Gertrude Lawrence

from the album Glamorous Music from Lady in the Dark
- Published: 1941
- Released: March 1941
- Recorded: February 23, 1941
- Studio: Victor Studio 2, New York City
- Genre: Traditional pop
- Length: 3:15
- Label: RCA Victor
- Composer: Kurt Weill
- Lyricist: Ira Gershwin

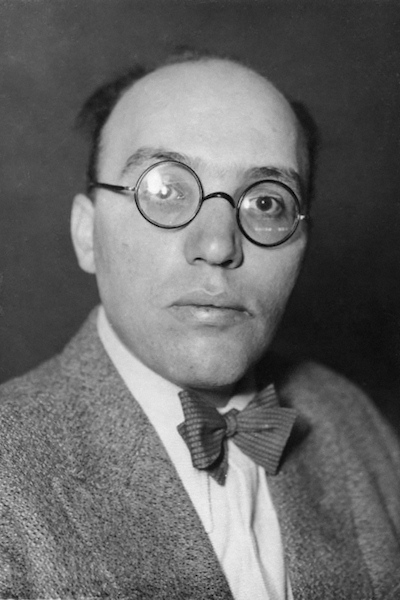
Composer Kurt Weill

"The Saga of Jenny" is a popular song written for the 1941 Broadway musical Lady in the Dark, with music by Kurt Weill and lyrics by Ira Gershwin, considered now as a blues standard.

The music is marked "Allegretto quasi andantino"; Gershwin describes it as "a sort of blues bordello".

It was premiered by Gertrude Lawrence in the role of Liza Elliott, the editor of a fashion magazine. In the context of the show, the song comes in a dream sequence in which Elliott defends her indecision about marriage by telling the tale of "a girl named Jenny/Whose virtues were varied and many—/Excepting that she was inclined/Always to make up her mind", until she "kicked the bucket at 76." Jenny's decisive nature is blamed for multiple disasters, including forcing the necessity of the United States' Good Neighbor Policy. The moral of the song is "don't make up your mind."

It followed the Danny Kaye song "Tschaikowsky (and Other Russians)", and in Kaye's original recording, he sings the passages about Liza Elliot's inability to make up her mind.

The song was included in the 1944 Hollywood film Lady in the Dark and also features in a dance sequence in the 1968 musical Star!, with Julie Andrews portraying Gertrude Lawrence.

Artistes who have recorded the song include Gertrude Lawrence, Dawn Upshaw, Lotte Lenya, Julie Andrews, Ute Lemper, Danny Kaye, Mildred Bailey, and by Benny Goodman & His Orchestra with Helen Forrest.

The song was re-written in 1988 by the songwriter and librettist Stephen Sondheim for his great friend musician and co-writer of the musical West Side Story Leonard Bernstein's 70th birthday with the ironic title of "The Saga of Lenny, with no apologies to Kurt Weill and Ira Gershwin". The song was sung on that occasion by Bernstein's friend the actress Lauren Bacall.
