= Don Loper =

American fashion designer

Don Loper (April 29, 1906 – November 21, 1972) was an American costume and necktie designer, as well as a screenwriter, choreographer, associate producer, actor, and assistant to MGM musicals producer Arthur Freed.

Loper was born on April 29, 1906, in Toledo, Ohio, as Lincoln George Hardloper. He began his career as a dancer and was teamed with Ginger Rogers in the film Lady in the Dark (1944). Loper is also known for introducing Judy Garland to her future husband, director Vincente Minnelli (Meet Me in St. Louis). He is known for his work on It's a Pleasure (1945), Sofia (1948) and Lady in the Dark (1944). He was married to Violet Hughes. Loper's works, some of which were designed for stars like Ella Fitzgerald and Lucille Ball are featured in the Los Angeles County Museum of Art and the California African American Museum. He played himself in an episode of I Love Lucy titled "The Fashion Show" in 1955. Loper would design stewardess uniforms for Pan Am and Trans World Airlines. He died on November 22, 1972, at UCLA Medical Center, in Santa Monica, California.
