= Lady in the Dark (film) =

1944 American musical film

- Film poster
- Directed by: Mitchell Leisen
- Screenplay by: Frances Goodrich; Albert Hackett
- Based on: Lady in the Dark (1941 play) by Moss Hart
- Produced by: Richard Blumenthal; Buddy G. DeSylva
- Starring: Ginger Rogers; Ray Milland; Warner Baxter; Jon Hall
- Cinematography: Ray Rennahan
- Edited by: Alma Macrorie
- Music by: Score: Robert Emmett Dolan; Songs: Kurt Weill (music); Ira Gershwin (lyrics); Jimmy Van Heusen (music); Johnny Burke (lyrics)
- Distributed by: Paramount Pictures
- Release dates: February 9, 1944 (Los Angeles); February 22, 1944 (New York)
- Running time: 100 minutes
- Country: United States
- Language: English
- Budget: $2.6 million or $2.5 million
- Box office: $4.3 million

Lady in the Dark is a 1944 American musical film directed by Mitchell Leisen. The screenplay was written by Frances Goodrich and Albert Hackett from a 1941 musical of the same name by Moss Hart. The film stars Ginger Rogers, Ray Milland, Warner Baxter and Jon Hall.

== Plot ==
Liza Elliott is a no-nonsense workaholic and the editor-in-chief of fashion magazine Allure, which is published by her boyfriend Kendall Nesbitt. They wish to marry but cannot, as Kendall's estranged wife has refused to grant a divorce. Liza has recently developed a series of headaches and strange nightmares, and she must deal with marketing manager Charley Johnson, who seems to take pride in annoying her.

Liza reluctantly undergoes psychoanalysis with Dr. Alex Brooks, who suggests that her direct approach to life is caused by something from her past that has forced her to avoid becoming as glamorous as the models in her magazine. Liza discounts this theory, and after Kendall's wife finally agrees to a divorce, she has a bizarre dream in which she is chased to the top of a large wedding cake, where Charley asks whether she wishes to marry him.

Movie star Randy Curtis visits the Allure offices for a photo shoot, and Liza accepts a dinner date with him. Anxious about the date, she intends to cancel it and storms out of Dr. Brooks' office when he suggests that she is anxious because she is afraid to compete with other women. Charley informs Liza that he will be leaving Allure for another magazine that has offered more creative control. Kendall confronts Liza about her fears, and she confesses that she is confused. She proceeds with her date with Curtis, wearing a beautiful dress for a change. The date is ruined when they encounter Charley, whose date aggressively pursues Randy.

Liza returns home and dreams that she is subjected to a trial by Kendall and Charley at a circus. After singing about her troubles, she dreams of her father scolding her for dressing glamorously. She recounts the dream to Dr. Brooks, feeling that she may have identified the reason for her plain style. Following her mother's death when Liza was a young girl, Liza tried to make her father happy by wearing one of her mother's glamorous dresses but was instead scolded, and she became detached from him. Another incident involved losing a boy to another girl after her high-school graduation. Dr. Brooks concludes that these incidents indeed contributed to her current life and suggests that Liza open herself to her childhood desires.

With this new knowledge, Liza decides to quit her job at the magazine and ends her relationship with Kendall. She is disappointed to learn that Curtis was only courting her to become the head of his new production company. However, when Charley visits to say goodbye to her, Liza realizes that she loves him. She offers him the opportunity to run the magazine along with her.

== Cast ==
- Ginger Rogers as Liza Elliott
- Ray Milland as Charley Johnson
- Warner Baxter as Kendall Nesbitt
- Jon Hall as Randy Curtis
- Barry Sullivan as Dr. Brooks
- Mischa Auer as Russell Paxton
- Phyllis Brooks as Allison DuBois
- Mary Philips as Maggie Grant
- Edward Fielding as Dr. Carlton
- Don Loper as Adams
- Mary Parker as Miss Parker
- Catherine Craig as Miss Foster
- Marietta Canty as Martha
- Virginia Farmer as Miss Edwards
- Fay Helm as Miss Bowers
- Charles Smith as Ben
- Gail Russell as Barbara
- John T. Bambury as Bunny, Midget (uncredited)

== Production ==
The film was based on the 1941 Broadway musical Lady in the Dark, written by Kurt Weill (music), Ira Gershwin (lyrics) and Moss Hart (book and direction). The film version cut most of the Weill/Gershwin songs from the score. "The Saga of Jenny" and "Girl of the Moment" remained, and part of "This Is New" is played by a nightclub band in the background. Part of "My Ship" was hummed by Ginger Rogers, but the song itself was never sung.

Paramount won the screen rights to the musical in February 1941 after a bidding war with Columbia, Warner Bros. and Howard Hughes. The studio initially purchased the property as a vehicle to reunite Rogers with Fred Astaire. However, after negotiations with Astaire failed, the studio cast Ray Milland, who had recently starred with Rogers in Paramount's The Major and the Minor.

The film was first released on February 10, 1944, and was a critical and commercial success. It was nominated for three Academy Awards: Best Cinematography, Best Music and Best Art Direction (Hans Dreier, Raoul Pene Du Bois, Ray Moyer).

== Release ==
Lady in the Dark premiered at a star-studded gala at the Paramount Hollywood Theater on February 9, 1944, that was noted for its wartime extravagance. Patriotic ceremonies were also conducted.

== Reception ==
In a contemporary review for The New York Times, critic Bosley Crowther wrote: "Imagine the gaudiest creations of all the fancy dressmakers in the trade; imagine the most resplendent spectacles of the Music Hall rolled into one; imagine a lacquered Ginger Rogers strolling sleekly through this compound mise en scène—and you have a moderate impression of this new film ... For the studio, to use a common idiom, has completely shot the works and turned out a Technicolored march-past which puts such previous screen parades to shame."

Film critic Pauline Kael metions the film achieved a sense of rapid cutting through numerous revolving stages.

Reviewer Edwin Schallert of the Los Angeles Times wrote: "Mitchell Leisen has really produced and directed a picture that should go a long way in popularity, and that is one of the flashiest Hollywood shows of this or any other year. If it all seems too much ado about a woman's disturbed nerves—well, the stage piece had a run of several years. Those who shy away from the enterprise on this account probably won't come anywhere near equaling the audience that will find the film a colorful and often exciting experience in the film theater. And if any woman doesn't want to hasten to a psycho-analyst [sic] after she sees all this it will be a marvel."

== Radio adaptations ==
Lady in the Dark, adapted from the 1944 film, was broadcast on BBC Home Service on August 14, 1944 (and repeated on September 18, 1944). The radio adaptation was written by Rhoderick Walker and produced by Tom Ronald. Although the radio play was adapted from the film, Gertrude Lawrence played the original part that she created in the New York stage production of 1941.

Lady in the Dark was twice presented on Lux Radio Theatre. On January 29, 1945, a one-hour adaptation starred Ginger Rogers and Ray Milland reprising their film roles. On February 16, 1953, a second adaptation was aired, starring Judy Garland and John Lund.
