= Speak Low =

1943 popular song

"Speak Low" (1943) is a popular song composed by Kurt Weill, with lyrics by Ogden Nash.

== Background ==
It was introduced by Mary Martin and Kenny Baker in the Broadway musical One Touch of Venus (1943). The 1944 hit single was by Guy Lombardo and his orchestra, with vocal by Billy Leach. Ava Gardner (dubbed by Eileen Wilson) and Dick Haymes sang the song in the feature film version of One Touch of Venus (1948).

The tune is a jazz standard that has been widely recorded, both by vocal artists from Billie Holiday and Tony Bennett to the Miracles and Dee Dee Bridgewater, and such instrumentalists as James Moody, Chet Baker, Gerry Mulligan, Bill Evans, Sonny Clark with Donald Byrd and John Coltrane, Roy Hargrove, Coleman Hawkins, Woody Shaw, Bobby Shew, Eumir Deodato and Brian Bromberg. Pianist Walter Bishop Jr. in 1961 recorded an album, Speak Low, featuring the song. Ella Fitzgerald and Joe Pass recorded this in 1983 (on CD Speak Love). Al Caiola's 1961 version reached #105 on Cashbox magazine's "Looking Ahead" survey. Kurt Weill himself also recorded the song.

== Barbra Streisand version ==
"Speak Low"

Single by Barbra Streisand

from the album Back to Broadway
- Released: January 1, 1993
- Genre: Musical; ballad
- Label: Columbia
- Songwriters: Kurt Weill; Ogden Nash

Barbra Streisand singles chronology
"Someone That I Used to Love" (1989)	"Speak Low" (1993)	"The Music of the Night" (1994)

In 1993, American singer, songwriter, actress and director Barbra Streisand released a cover of "Speak Low", taken from her twenty-sixth studio album, Back to Broadway (1993).

=== Critical reception ===
Larry Flick from Billboard magazine wrote, "Tune from One Touch of Venus has a seductive, shuffling rhythm that blends well with Johnny Mandel's lush orchestration. As always, Streisand is in exemplary vocal form, and this track will prove a total joy to her devoted legion of fans." Sam Wood from Philadelphia Inquirer complimented it as a "lusciously arranged ballad", and "a sinuous rhythm-and-blues reinterpretation" that's "probably Streisand's best chance for a radio hit" since "Memory". Richard Harrington from The Washington Post felt that with Streisand singing low over Mandell's "supple orchestrations, it feels more like a pop song than a show standard."
