= Viola Odette Harlow =

American musician

Viola Odette Harlow also known as Glüme is an American musician.

== Personal life ==
In 2019, she was diagnosed with Prinzmetal angina.

== Albums ==
- The Internet (Italians Do It Better, 2021)
- Main Character (Italians Do It Better, 2023)
- Porn Star (Play Girl Records, 2024)
- Science Fiction (Play Girl Records, 2026)
