= Jerome Moross =

American composer (1913–1983)

- Born: August 1, 1913; New York City, U.S.
- Died: July 25, 1983 (aged 69) Miami, Florida, U.S.
- Genres: Film score; orchestral music
- Occupations: Composer; orchestrator
- Spouse: Hazel Abrams (m. 1939)

Jerome Moross (August 1, 1913 – July 25, 1983) was an American composer best known for his music for film and television. He also composed works for symphony orchestras, chamber ensembles, soloists and musical theater, as well as orchestrating scores for other composers.

== Biography ==
He was born in Brooklyn, New York City, United States, in 1913 to Jewish parents: Mollie (Greenberg) Moross, born in New York, and Samuel Moross, born in Russia. He became a talented piano player and composed music for the theater. During his early years, Moross met and became lifelong friends with Bernard Herrmann. In 1931, he met Aaron Copland and joined his Young Composers Group, whose members also included Herrmann. Copland supported his work and Herrmann provided him an introduction to the entertainment media, beginning with the composition of music cues for radio shows in 1935. In the 1940s he began to work in Hollywood, California, where he would compose the music scores for sixteen films from 1948 to 1969.

In 1956 he composed the score for the World War II drama The Sharkfighters, possibly traveling to Cuba with the film company. The score is distinctive in its use of ethnic themes featuring syncopation and percussion instruments that stress the ostinato rhythm that soon became the signature style element of his scores for many westerns.

His best-known film score is that for the 1958 movie The Big Country, for which he was nominated for an Academy Award for Best Original Score. According to Moross, he composed the main title after recalling a walk he took in the flatlands around Albuquerque, New Mexico, during a visit in October 1936, shortly before he moved to Hollywood.

His other works include the music for the films The Proud Rebel (1958), The Mountain Road (1960), The Adventures of Huckleberry Finn (1960), Five Finger Exercise (1962), The Cardinal (1963), The War Lord (1965), Rachel, Rachel (1968), The Valley of Gwangi (1969) and Hail, Hero! (1969). He also composed the main theme for the 3rd–8th seasons of the television western series Wagon Train, the theme of which was based on his score for the 1959 historical western The Jayhawkers!.

Moross wrote the music for the musical The Golden Apple, which premiered Off-Broadway in 1954 and then transferred to Broadway. Its best-known song was "Lazy Afternoon."

He also orchestrated for other composers, usually uncredited, including such films as Our Town for Copland and The Best Years of Our Lives for Hugo Friedhofer.

Moross's concert works included a sonata for a piano duet and string quartet, and a symphony that was premiered by conductor Sir Thomas Beecham on October 18, 1943 in Seattle, Washington.

In 1939, in New York City, he married Hazel Abrams, the daughter of Jewish immigrants from Russia. They had a daughter. Moross died in Miami on July 25, 1983, aged 69, from complications of a stroke and congestive heart failure, just 4 months after Hazel died. He was buried in Mount Ararat Cemetery in East Farmingdale, New York, next to Hazel.

== Theatre works ==
- Mother (1935) – play – co-incidental music composer
- Susanna and the Elders (1948) – one-act musical – composer
- Willie the Weeper (1948) – one-act musical – composer
- The Eccentricities of Davey Crockett (1948) – one-act musical – composer
- The Golden Apple (1954) – musical – composer
- Gentlemen, Be Seated! (1963) – musical – composer

== Bibliography ==
- Bloom, Ken. American song. The complete musical theater companion. 1877–1995, Vol. 2, 2nd edition, Schirmer Books, 1996.
- Borroff, Edith; Clark, J. Bunker. American Opera. A Checklist, Harmonie Park Press, 1992.
- Larkin, Colin. The Encyclopedia of Popular Music, Third edition, Macmillan, 1998.
- Press, Jaques Cattell (Ed.). Who's who in American Music. Classical, First edition. R. R. Bowker, New York 1983.
- Sadie, Stanley. The new Grove dictionary of music and musicians, Macmillan, 1980.
- Sadie, Stanley; Hitchcock, H. Wiley (Ed.). The New Grove Dictionary of American Music. Grove's Dictionaries of Music, 1986.
- Wescott, Steven D. A Comprehensive Bibliography of Music for Film and Television, Information Coordinatores, 1985.
- Whitmer, Mariana. Jerome Moross's THE BIG COUNTRY: A Film Score Guide, Scarecrow Press, 2012.
