= The Golden Apple (musical) =

- 1954 Original Cast Recording
- Music: Jerome Moross
- Lyrics: John Treville Latouche
- Book: John Treville Latouche
- Basis: Iliad and Odyssey of Homer
- Productions: 1954 Off-Broadway; 1954 Broadway; 1961 Equity Library Theatre; 1962 York Playhouse; 1995 Light Opera Works; 2014 Lyric Stage Dallas

The Golden Apple is a musical in two acts with music by Jerome Moross and both book and lyrics by John Treville Latouche. The musical's story is based on parts of the Iliad and Odyssey. The musical premiered Off-Broadway in 1954 and then transferred to Broadway.

== Productions ==
The Golden Apple was one of the first musicals produced Off-Broadway at the Phoenix Theatre, where it opened on March 11, 1954. The musical transferred to Broadway on April 20, 1954, to the Alvin Theater where it played for only 125 performances despite rave reviews. The original production starred Kaye Ballard as Helen and Stephen Douglass as Ulysses. It was the first Off-Broadway show to win the Best Musical award from the New York Drama Critics' Circle. While Latouche's lyrics are much praised, Steven Suskin wrote: "The Golden Apple benefits from imaginative theatricality in all departments but it was the more-than-glorious score that carried this brilliant musical theatre experiment from Off Broadway to the Alvin", a Broadway theater.

The musical is through-composed and exhibits features similar to more operatic musicals like Porgy and Bess, The Mother of Us All, Candide, and The Most Happy Fella. Jerome Moross was a classical composer of concert music and ballets, as well as a highly appreciated film score. Though the show is held in high esteem by devotees of musical theater, the full score was not commercially recorded until 2015 and the show has never been revived on Broadway. The musical is remembered in part for introducing the standard "Lazy Afternoon," sung by Ballard, and its fantastical, suggestive settings by William and Jean Eckart.

The musical was presented Off-Broadway in 1961 at the Equity Library Theatre, and in 1962 it was produced at the York Playhouse. Both productions were directed by Robert Ennis Turoff and starred Roberta MacDonald as Helen and Stan Page as Ulysses.

The musical continues to receive occasional productions. For example, a 1990 production by the York Theater Company in New York featured Muriel Costa-Greenspon. The work was produced in 1995 by Light Opera Works in Chicago, Illinois and in 2006 by the 42nd Street Moon Company in San Francisco, California. The Shaw Festival, Niagara-on-the-Lake, Ontario, Canada, presented a staged concert in October 2006.

The complete piano-vocal score was published for the first time in 2009 by Alfred Music Publishing. In October 2014 the Lyric Stage in Dallas, Texas, presented the first performances with full orchestra since the show's Broadway run. On February 8, 2015, Los Angeles' Musical Theatre Guild performed a one-night engagement of The Golden Apple with full orchestra at the Moss Theatre in Santa Monica.

It was presented as part of the New York City Center "Encores!" staged concert series from May 10–14, 2017.

== Recordings ==
The Original Broadway Cast Recording, released by RCA Victor in 1954, had to cut a great deal of the lengthy sung-through score in order to fit on a single Long Playing disc. The conductor was Benjamin Steinberg. (Extended cast albums were unheard of at that time, with the precedent being set two years later with a triple LP album of Frank Loesser's The Most Happy Fella.) This fifty-minute version of the score was the only one available for six decades.

The record label PS Classics recorded performances of the Lyric Stage production and released the first full-length recording of the score on May 19, 2015.

== Roles and original cast ==
- Helen – Kaye Ballard
- Lovey Mars – Bibi Osterwald
- Penelope – Priscilla Gillette
- Ulysses Spelvin – Stephen Douglass
- Paris – Jonathan Lucas
- Hector Charybdis – Jack Whiting
- Menelaus – Dean Michener
- Mrs. Juniper – Geraldine Viti
- Miss Minerva Oliver – Portia Nelson
- Mother Hare – Nola Day

== Synopsis ==
In the U.S. state of Washington, near Mt. Olympus at the turn of the 20th century, the small town of Angel's Roost is thrown into confusion when old Menelaus's fancy-free wife, Helen, runs off with a traveling salesman named Paris who is visiting the community to judge an apple pie baking contest. Ulysses, who has just returned from military service in the Spanish–American War, leaves his wife Penelope as he joins in a ten-year expedition to get Helen to return.

== Musical numbers ==
Act I

- Overture
- Nothin' Ever Happens in Angel's Roost – Helen, Lovey Mars, Mrs. Juniper and Miss Minerva Oliver
- My Love Is on the Way – Penelope
- It Was a Glad Adventure – Ulysses and the Heroes
- Come Along, Boys – The Heroes and Ensemble
- It's the Going Home Together – Ulysses and Penelope
- Helen Is Always Willing – The Heroes
- Introducin' Mr. Paris – Ensemble
- The Judgement of Paris – Mother Hare, Miss Minerva, Mrs. Juniper, Lovely Mars, Paris
- Lazy Afternoon – Helen
- Departure for Rhododendron – Ensemble

Act II

- My Picture in the Papers – Helen, Paris and Male Ensemble
- Taking Rhododendron – Ulysses and the Heroes, Citizens
- Hector's Song – Hector
- Windflowers – Penelope
- Store-bought Suit – Ulysses
- Madame Calypso – Mrs. Juniper and Ensemble
- Scylla and Charybdis – Hector and Juniper
- By Goona-Goona Lagoon – Lovey Mars
- Doomed, Doomed, Doomed – Miss Minerva
- Circe, Circe – Circe, Mother Hare and the Ensemble
- Ulysses's Soliloquy – Ulysses and Chorus
- Busy Little Sewing Bee – Penelope and Ensemble
- Penelope's Tirade – Penelope
- We've Just Begun √ – Ulysses and Penelope
- Curtain Call: It's the Going Home Together

During the Broadway run of the show, the finale was replaced at the insistence of the producers with a reprise of "It's the Going Home Together" with chorus, and this was used for the cast album. The published score contains the original ending.

== See also ==
- Epic: The Musical, a 2020s musical based on the Odyssey
- Glam Slam Ulysses, a 1993 musical based on the Odyssey
- Home Sweet Homer, a 1975 musical based on the Odyssey
