= Tschaikowsky (and Other Russians) =

Patter song by Ira Gershwin and Kurt Weill

Song by Danny Kaye

from the album Lady in the Dark
- Published: 1941
- Genre: patter
- Length: 2:09
- Composer: Kurt Weill
- Lyricist: Ira Gershwin

"Tschaikowsky (and Other Russians)" is a patter song with lyrics by Ira Gershwin and music by Kurt Weill, first performed by American comedian Danny Kaye in the 1941 Broadway musical Lady in the Dark. Gershwin used the spelling "Tschaikowsky" from the German transliteration (used by German music publishers of the period) in place of the more widely accepted modern transliteration Tchaikovsky.

"Tschaikowsky (and Other Russians)" is not a song in the normal sense of the term: it is a rhyming list of fifty Russian composers' names, which Kaye rattled off (in a speaking, not singing, voice) as rapidly as possible. At each performance, Kaye tried to break his previous speed record for reciting this song: consequently, it was intended to be recited a cappella (without instrumental accompaniment), as the orchestra could not keep up with him. The performance launched Kaye's career.

One of the names in the song is "Dukelsky"; this is actually the birth name of Vernon Duke, an American composer. Similarly, Stanisław Moniuszko, Witold Maliszewski and Leopold Godowsky are ethnic Poles. All four of these men were, however, born within the Russian empire.

The song was originally a nonsense poem which Ira Gershwin had published in a college newspaper under the name "Arthur Francis" (derived from the names of his other brother Arthur and his sister Frances) in his student days. Decades later, in his memoir Lyrics on Several Occasions, Ira Gershwin expressed the hope that someone might accuse him of plagiarizing his song "Tschaikowsky" from the collegiate poem, so he could reveal that he and Arthur Francis were the same person.

== List of composers ==
With adjustments to Gershwin's spelling, here are the Russian composers mentioned in the song, in order: Witold Maliszewski, Anton Rubinstein, Anton Arensky, Pyotr Ilyich Tchaikovsky, Wassily Sapellnikoff, Nikolai Dmitriev-Svechin, Alexander Tcherepnin, Ivan Kryzhanovsky, Leopold Godowsky, Nikolai Artsybushev, Stanisław Moniuszko, Fyodor Akimenko, Nicolai Soloviev, Sergei Prokofiev, Dimitri Tiomkin, Arseny Koreshchenko, Mikhail Glinka, Alexander Winkler, Dmitry Bortniansky, Vladimir Rebikov, Alexander Ilyinsky, Nikolai Medtner, Mily Balakirev, Vasily Zolotarev, Pyotr Abramovich Khvoshchinsky, Nikolay Sokolov, Alexander Kopylov, Vernon Duke (born Dukelsky), Nikolay Klenovsky, Dmitri Shostakovich, Alexander Borodin, Reinhold Glière, David Nowakowsky, Anatoly Lyadov, Genari Karganoff, Igor Markevitch, Semyon Panchenko, Alexander Dargomyzhsky, Vladimir Shcherbachov, Alexander Scriabin, Sergei Vasilenko, Igor Stravinsky, Nikolai Rimsky-Korsakov, Modest Mussorgsky, Alexander Gretchaninov, Alexander Glazunov, César Cui, Vasily Kalinnikov, Sergei Rachmaninoff, and Joseph Rumshinsky.
