= One Touch of Venus =

American satirical musical

- Sheet Music Cover
- Music: Kurt Weill
- Lyrics: Ogden Nash
- Book: Ogden Nash; S. J. Perelman
- Basis: Thomas Anstey Guthrie's novella The Tinted Venus
- Productions: 1943 Broadway; 1948 Film; 1992 Barbican Centre; 1995 BBC Radio; 1997 Light Opera Works; 2000 Royal Opera House; 2001 King's Head Theatre

One Touch of Venus is a 1943 musical with music written by Kurt Weill, lyrics by Ogden Nash, and book by S. J. Perelman and Nash, based on the 1885 novella The Tinted Venus by Thomas Anstey Guthrie, and very loosely spoofing the Pygmalion myth. The show satirizes contemporary American suburban values, artistic fads and romantic and sexual mores. Weill had been in America for eight years by the time he wrote this musical, and his music, though retaining his early haunting power, had evolved into a very different Broadway style.

== Story ==
Rodney Hatch, a barber, is engaged to Gloria Kramer. While visiting an art museum, he feels drawn to a sculpture of Venus, the Roman goddess of love, though other patrons dismiss it as out of step with current art trends. On a whim, Rodney puts his engagement ring on the statue's finger, bringing the statue to life. Venus falls in love with Rodney and begins pursuing him, causing turmoil in his relationship with Gloria. When Venus becomes annoyed with Gloria, she transports her to the North Pole. To further complicate matters, with the statue missing from the museum, Rodney is arrested for art theft, but Venus helps him escape. Rodney begins to fall in love with the goddess, but their time together is cut short when she is called away by the gods and becomes a statue again. When Gloria returns from the North Pole, she is furious with Rodney and breaks off their engagement. Rodney returns to the museum and looks at the statue again. He unexpectedly bumps into a young woman from out of town who bears a striking resemblance to the statue. Rodney leaves the museum with her, and as she starts to tell him her name, he responds, "You don't have to tell me. I know."

== Original production ==
The original Broadway production opened at the Imperial Theatre on October 7, 1943, and closed on February 10, 1945, after 567 performances. It was directed by Elia Kazan, featured choreography by Agnes de Mille, and was co-produced by John Wildberg and Cheryl Crawford. It starred Mary Martin, Kenny Baker and Paula Laurence. Marlene Dietrich backed out of the title role during rehearsals, calling it "too sexy and profane", which gave Martin the opportunity to establish herself as a Broadway star.

== Film version ==
The musical was made into a 1948 film, directed by William A. Seiter and starring Ava Gardner and Robert Walker. Actress Eve Arden co-starred. The movie version changed Hatch's first name from Rodney to Eddie and omitted much of the Broadway score; it received poor reviews.

== Other productions ==
In 1987, the piece played at the Goodspeed Opera House. Ian Marshall Fisher's Discovering Lost Musicals Charitable Trust has presented the work twice, first in 1992 at the Barbican Centre, and then in 2000 the Royal Opera House's Linbury Studio Theatre. Louise Gold played the title role on both occasions. Both productions also found Myra Sands playing Mrs Kramer; while Dick Vosburgh put in an appearance in the 2000 production.

Its premiered in Germany on June 17, 1994, at the Meiningen Court Theatre in Meiningen, Thuringia.

In 1995, BBC Radio broadcast the piece with Paige O'Hara in the title role. Other cast members included Kim Criswell, Peter Gale, Myra Sands (as Mrs. Kramer) and Dick Vosburgh.

In 1996, New York City Center's Encores! series presented the piece, directed by Leonard Foglia with Melissa Errico in the title role. In 1997, Light Opera Works in Illinois produced the work.

In 2001, London's first major theatrical run opened at the King's Head Theatre in Islington. With a new adaptation by director Tim Childs it starred Peter Land as Whitelaw Savory, Michael Gyngell, and newcomer Kim Medcalf as Venus. It opened to glowing reviews but failed to transfer to the West End, probably because Childs, with an eye to opening the same production on Broadway, workshopped it with Land reprising his role and Sara Ramirez as Venus in New York two weeks after September 11, 2001. Not surprisingly, New York Producers did not want to commit to producing the piece at that time.

Opera North produced the piece in 2004 at the Grand Theatre, Leeds, directed by Tim Albery.

42nd Street Moon produced the musical in 2007 at Eureka Theatre in San Francisco, directed by Greg MacKellan, with musical direction & accompaniment by Dave Dobrusky, choreography by Tom Segal, lighting by Ellen Brooks, scenic decoration by Mike Figueira, and costume design by Louise Jarmilowicz. The cast included: Nina Josephs as Venus, Anil Margsahayam as Rodney Hatch, Peter Budinger as Whitelaw Savory, Amy Louise Cole as Molly Grant, Tom Orr as Julius E. "Taxi" Black, Juliet Heller as Gloria Kramer, Chris Macomber as Mrs. Florabelle Kramer, Tyler Kent as Stanley/Zuvetli/Dr. Rook, Jarrod Quon as Sam and Elise Youssef as Rose.

Metal Monkey Theatre Company produced a revival of the musical for the 2009 Edinburgh Festival Fringe, Scotland, directed by Michael Hall, with musical direction & accompaniment by Duncan White. The cast included: Chrissy Quinn as Venus, Michael Trakas as Rodney Hatch, John Kirkman as Whitelaw Savory, Emily Grogan as Molly Grant, Alex Murphy as Julius E. "Taxi" Black, Jo Britton as Gloria Kramer, Morven Rae Mrs. Florabelle Kramer, David Sanders as Stanley/Dr. Rook, Simon Motz as Zuvetli, Christopher Rorke as Sam, Sarah Block as Mrs Moats and Claire Kennard as Rose. They performed the show at Augustine's (Venue 152) in August 2009 and received a 5-star review from www.musicaltalk.co.uk

On May 13, 2014, Jay Records released a two-CD production billed as the "First Complete Recording" of One Touch of Venus with Melissa Errico in the title role. John Owen Edwards and James Holmes conducted the National Symphony (U.K.). The recording was thirteen years in the making (2000–2013) and involved studios in both London and New York City. Co-starring were Ron Raines (Whitelaw Savory), Victoria Clark (Molly Grant) and Brent Barrett (Rodney Hatch).

== Television adaptation ==
In 1955, Janet Blair starred as Venus in a live production of One Touch of Venus on NBC-TV.

== Other recordings ==
A song from Act I of the production, "I'm a Stranger Here Myself", was performed live by Rufus Wainwright in 2025 and recorded as part of a tribute album to Kurt Weill released that same year, titled "I'm a Stranger Here Myself: Wainwright Does Weill".

== Musical numbers ==
Act I

- Overture – Orchestra
- "New Art Is True Art" – Whitelaw Savory and Chorus
- "One Touch of Venus" – Molly Grant and Girls
- "How Much I Love You" – Rodney Hatch
- "I'm A Stranger Here Myself" – Venus
- "Forty Minutes for Lunch" – (ballet)
- "West Wind" – Savory and Chorus
- "Way Out West in Jersey" – Mrs. Kramer, Gloria Kramer, and Rodney
- "That's How I Am Sick of Love" – Rodney
- "Foolish Heart" – Venus
- The Trouble With Women – Rodney, Savory, Taxi Black, and Stanley
- "Speak Low" – Venus and Rodney
- "Artist's Ball" – Orchestra
- "Doctor Crippen" – Savory and Dancers

Act II

- Entr'acte – Orchestra
- "Very, Very, Very" – Molly
- "Speak Low" (Reprise) – Rodney and Venus
- "Catch Hatch" – Savory, Molly, Stanley, Taxi Black, Mrs. Kramer, 3 Anatolians, and Chorus
- "That's Him" – Venus
- "Wooden Wedding" – Rodney
- "Venus in Ozone Heights" – (ballet)
- "Speak Low" (Reprise) – Rodney

== Principal roles ==
- Whitelaw Savory, a wealthy art collector (baritone)
- Molly Grant, Mr. Savory's secretary (mezzo-soprano)
- Rodney Hatch, a barber (tenor)
- Venus (mezzo-soprano)
- Gloria Kramer, Rodney's fiancée (mezzo-soprano)
- Mrs. Kramer, Gloria's mother (mezzo-soprano)
- Taxi Black and Stanley, two thugs
- Police Lieutenant
- Dr. Rook, a psychiatrist
- Zuvetli, a 'thoroughly unreconstructed' Anatolian
