= Getting Married Today (song) =

From the Sondheim musical Company

- by Stephen Sondheim
- Genre: Show tune
- Form: Patter song
- Published: 1970

"Getting Married Today" is a patter song from the 1970 musical Company, with music and lyrics by Stephen Sondheim. Sung by the manic Amy on her wedding day, the trappings of marriage send her into a panic. The song is among the most difficult for musical theatre performers, with one verse containing 68 words to be sung in roughly 11 seconds: where a successful performance “depends on clear diction, implicit pitch accuracy and breath support alongside imperative comedic timing.”

== Production ==
"Getting Married Today" was conceived as "Sondheim's psychotic notion of a patter song" to simulate the sensation of having a mental breakdown through verbal diarrhea and constantly changing the subject mid-sentence.

Stephen Sondheim gave a masterclass on some of his songs, including this one, at London's Guildhall School.

The song features operatic interludes described by Edge Boston as "soprano intermezzos", sung by a priest who comically comments on the bride's breakdown and extols the glory of marriage.

== Lyrical content ==
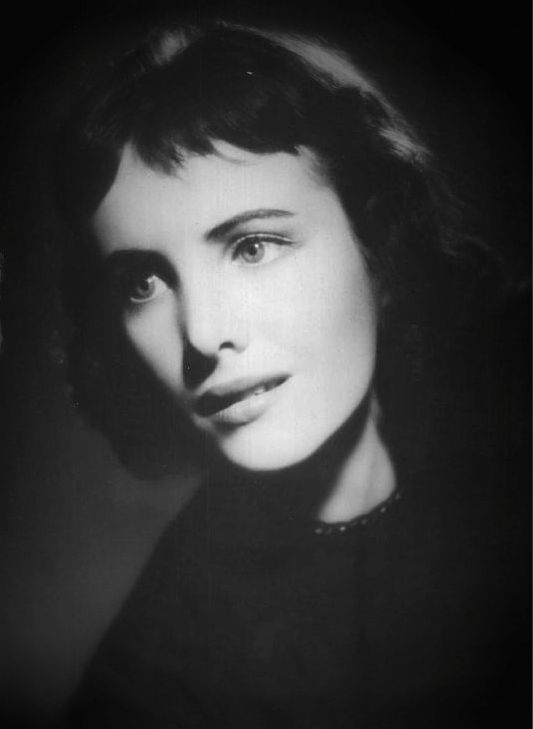
Beth Howland as Amy introduced "Getting Married Today" on Broadway in 1970.

In her meltdown, Amy discusses the very nature of a wedding, and how it is not relevant to a modern society:

Wedding, what's a wedding? It's a prehistoric ritual where
Everybody promises fidelity forever, which is
Maybe the most horrifying word I ever heard, and which is
Followed by a honeymoon, where suddenly he'll realize he's
Saddled with a nut and wanna kill me which he should.

== Critical reception ==
It has been described as "one of Sondheim's toughest songs". Journal Sentinel said the song captures "both the crazed humor and darker undertow within this manic bride". White Rhino Report wrote "Amy's frenetic rant about not being ready for marriage is a rapid-fire patter song. Set off against this insanity is the ironic counterpoint of Jenny's operatic aria about the beauty of a wedding day." Commenting on Stephen Sondheim's 'Company' With The New York Philharmonic, The AV Club wrote "it'd be hard for anyone to sing the patter-iffic 'Getting Married Today' as fast as it's meant to be, even with months to work on it". Chichester Observer said Amy is a "jittery bride-to-be" with an "epic breakdown and breakneck teeth-rattling delivery".

The Guardian wrote the show "boasts the most astonishing score of any Stephen Sondheim work, and at the same time a book demonstrating an almost complete lack of commitment to coherent narrative", adding that the show has a "large dollop of irony". It continued by saying: "The result is numbers, such as 'The Little Things You Do Together' and 'Getting Married Today', that are sheer bliss to listen to, but often unexpectedly disappointing and distancing in performance."

== Performances ==
- Jayma Mays performed this song in the fourth season of Glee, specifically in the fourteenth episode, "I Do".
- Jonathan Bailey originated the gender-swapped role of Jamie who performed the song in Marianne Elliott's 2018 West End revival. Bailey, "whose lightning-fast, show-stopping rendition of the song became a must-see West End event" according to Variety, won him the Laurence Olivier Award for Best Actor in a Supporting Role in a Musical in 2019.
