= Lady in the Dark =

1941 musical by Moss Hart

- Original Broadway Playbill
- Music: Kurt Weill
- Lyrics: Ira Gershwin
- Book: Moss Hart
- Productions: 1941 Broadway; 1944 Film; 1954 Television movie 1981 Nottingham, UK; 1997 London concert

Lady in the Dark is a musical with music by Kurt Weill, lyrics by Ira Gershwin and book and direction by Moss Hart. It was produced by Sam Harris. The protagonist, Liza Elliott, is the unhappy editor of a fashion magazine who is undergoing psychoanalysis. The musical ran on Broadway in 1941, and in the United Kingdom in 1981. A film version was released in 1944, and a live television special followed in 1954.

== Structure ==
Lady in the Dark has an unusual structure for a work of musical theatre. The play is divided into dialogue scenes portraying the life of the protagonist, Liza Elliott, and dream sequences portraying her fantasies and nightmares. The musical score is confined to the dream sequences, each of which takes the form of a mini-operetta; unlike a typical book musical, no songs are performed during the real-life scenes.

== Story ==
Liza Elliott finds herself constantly plagued by indecision in her professional and personal life. She is courted by two men, the already-married publisher Kendall Nesbitt who is trying to divorce his wife for Liza, and the film star Randy Curtis, and cannot decide whom to choose. When she begins seeing a psychologist, she delves into her dreams and memories of her unhappy childhood, and is haunted by the melody of a song she cannot recall. In one dream, she believes she is being put on trial for her indecision in a circus setting, with her marketing manager Charley Johnson acting as prosecutor, Kendall as chief witness, and Randy as her defense attorney, in which she defends her refusal to make up her mind ("The Saga of Jenny"). She eventually comes to realize that the root of her trauma is having been repeatedly rejected in her youth due to her plain appearance; as she makes this breakthrough, she remembers the mysterious song ("My Ship"). She realizes that Kendall and Randy both relate to her only on a superficial level, and finds true partnership with Charley, who sees her as an equal.

== Background ==
Originally beginning as a solo effort, I Am Listening, by Moss Hart about a successful woman who is under the care of a psychiatrist, the play later developed into a work involving Kurt Weill with a change in title.

The musical's theme of psychoanalysis is said to be based on Hart's own experiences with psychoanalyst Gregory Zilboorg. Except for the final song, all the music in the play is heard in three extended dream sequences: the Glamour Dream, the Wedding Dream, and the Circus Dream, which, to some extent, become three small operettas integrated into a straight play. The final song, "My Ship", functions as a leitmotif for Liza's insecurity: as each dream commences, a snippet of the tune is heard, as it is a haunting melody which Liza recognizes but cannot name, or sing with words, until her anxiety is resolved.

== Productions ==
The musical opened on Broadway at the Alvin Theatre (now the Neil Simon) on January 23, 1941 and closed on May 30, 1942 after 467 performances. Direction was by Hart, produced by Sam H. Harris, with musical staging by Hassard Short, who also was the production designer, and choreography by Albertina Rasch. The original cast included Gertrude Lawrence in the role of Liza Elliott, alongside Danny Kaye, Bert Lytell, Victor Mature, Donald Randolph, Margaret Dale, Davis Cunningham and Macdonald Carey.

Kaye's performance as fashion photographer Russell Paxton, and particularly his consistently showstopping performance of the patter song "Tschaikowsky (and Other Russians)" in which he dashes through the names of 50 Russian composers in 39 seconds, made him a star. The musical went on an eight city tour for 160 performances, and also played on the West Coast, including Los Angeles and San Francisco, for 56 performances. The show then ran at The Broadway Theatre from February 27 through May 15, 1943, for 83 performances. Gertrude Lawrence reprised her role as Liza Elliott in all venues.

== Subsequent productions ==
Lady in the Dark premiered in the United Kingdom on December 9, 1981, at the Nottingham Playhouse, Nottingham. American actor Celeste Holm starred; it was her British debut. Kendall Nesbitt was Jeremy Hawk, Robert Swales played Randy Curtis and Kenneth Nelson appeared as Russell Paxton. The show was produced by Crispin Thomas and musical director was Tony Britten. Jane Wenham was assistant director.

A New York City Center Encores! semi-staged concert was produced in New York in May 1994 with Christine Ebersole.

The musical opened on the West End at the Royal National Theatre, London, on March 11, running through August 2, 1997, directed by Francesca Zambello and starring Maria Friedman. The production received the Evening Standard Award for Best Musical.

A production was staged by Boston Academy of Music in 2000 starring mezzo-soprano Delores Ziegler, and by Philadelphia's Prince Music Theatre in the autumn of 2001, with Andrea Marcovicci as Liza Elliott.

A production by MasterVoices, directed and conducted by Ted Sperling, choreographed by Doug Varone, and starring Victoria Clark as Liza Elliott took place at New York City Center on April 25, 26, and 27, 2019. This production featured MasterVoices' 120 singers, the Orchestra of St. Luke's, and Doug Varone and Dancers. Amy Irving played Dr. Brooks and Victoria Clark played Liza Elliot.

A production was staged in China at Beijing’s Century Theatre in April 2003, directed by Jennifer Schwerin, conducted by Nicholas Michael Smith and produced by Nancy Fraser, Andrew Andreasen and Jiang Shan. Marsha Mercant performed the role of Liza Elliot and Michael Sterling performed the role of the Ringmaster.

== Adaptations ==
The 1944 film version starred Ginger Rogers and Ray Milland. The film cut most of the Weill/Gershwin songs, though "The Saga of Jenny" and "Girl of the Moment" remained, and part of "This Is New" is played by a nightclub band in the background. "My Ship" was heard as background music, but never sung, even though the music was constantly referred to in the story. Kaye's role went to Hollywood's "Mad Russian," the slightly taller Mischa Auer.

Lady in the Dark was adapted for the radio on multiple occasions. Gertrude Lawrence twice reprised her leading stage role for a one-hour adaptation on Theatre Guild on the Air; on October 19, 1947, and on March 5, 1950. On January 29, 1945, Ginger Rogers, who played Liza in the film version, starred with Ray Milland in a one-hour adaptation for Lux Radio Theatre on CBS Radio. On February 16, 1953 Judy Garland starred in a second Lux Radio Theatre adaptation alongside John Lund.

The musical was broadcast on NBC Television on September 25, 1954, as part of an irregularly scheduled series under the umbrella title Max Liebman Presents. Ann Sothern played Liza and Carleton Carpenter played Russell. A cast recording of the TV special was released on Sepia.

- Cast
- Ann Sothern as Liza Elliott
- James Daley as Charley Johnson
- Paul McGrath as Kendall Nesbitt
- Robert Fortier as Randy Culver
- Shepperd Strudwick as Dr. Brooks
- Carleton Carpenter as Russell Paxton
- Luella Gear as Maggie Grant
- Stephanie Augustine as Miss Foster
- James Congdon as Ben
- Marjorie Barrett as Barbara

== Songs ==
Act I
Glamour Dream

- "Oh Fabulous One in Your Ivory Tower" – Liza Elliott's Serenaders
- "The World's Inamorata" – Liza Elliott and Miss Foster
- "One Life to Live" – Liza Elliott and Russell Paxton
- "Girl of the Moment" – Ensemble

Wedding Dream

- "Liza, Liza" – Ensemble
- "Mapleton High Chorale" - Ensemble
- "This is New" – Randy Curtis and Liza Elliott
- "The Princess of Pure Delight" – Liza Elliott and Children
- "This Woman at the Altar" – Ensemble

Act II
Circus Dream

- "The Greatest Show on Earth" – Ringmaster (i.e., Russell Paxton) and Ensemble
- "The Best Years of His Life" – Charley Johnson and Randy Curtis
- "Tschaikowsky (and Other Russians)" – Ringmaster and Ensemble
- "The Saga of Jenny" – Liza Elliott, Jury and Ensemble

Final Scene

- "My Ship" – Liza Elliott (not retained in the film version)

== Recordings ==
Although recordings of individual songs were made, no attempt was made to record the entire score until 1963, when Lehman Engel produced a stereo studio recording for Columbia, starring Risë Stevens, Roger White, and Adolph Green. This recording was reissued as a Masterworks Heritage CD, MHK 62869. The reissue also includes five 1941 mono recordings of songs (including "Tschaikowsky") sung by Danny Kaye. According to the liner notes, the maximum playing time of an LP did not permit including everything, and some cuts were made (not specified, but mostly in the number of verses or repeats).

The Royal National Theatre revival in 1997 led to the first complete recording of the score (TER/JAY).

A telecast from February 11, 1981, Musical Comedy Tonight II, presented Danny Kaye (from the original cast), Lynn Redgrave, and others reenacting the circus scene from the original production of "Lady in the Dark," including Kaye's hit song "Tchaikovsky".

== Reception ==
Life Magazine wrote that "with its unique blend of serious drama, musical comedy and pageantry, Lady in the Dark is a grand-scale smash hit."
