= List of songs about Paris =

The following is a list of songs about Paris, France.

- "10 rue Caumartin" by Lionel Hampton
- "118 Bd Brune" by Algemona Group, Robin Kenyatta
- "14 Juillet (Rendez-vous de Paname)" by Patachou
- "1901" by Phoenix
- "21 rue Pigalle" by Joe Reisman & His Orchestra
- "24 Hours In Paris" by Blusher
- "3, rue de Lappe" by Jean-Claude Pascal
- "30 Avenue Bugeaud" by Rainer Pusch Trio Meets Horace Parlan
- "40 rue Monsieur le Prince" by David McNeil
- "The 4.08 to Paris" by Berlin Express
- "5, avenue Marceau" by Alain Chamfort
- "80 à Paris" by Skarface
- "À Batignoles" by Aristide Bruant
- "A Bracelet from Paris" by Robb Johnson
- "A Broadway in Paris" by Sigmund Romberg
- "A Candle in Notre Dame" by Adrian Legg
- "À Fontainebleau" by Ethelbert Nevin
- "A Girl from Paris" by Jean Briquet and Adolf Philipp
- "A Hat Paris" by Leo Marjane
- "À Joinville-le-Pont" by Bourvil
- "A Kiss from Paris" by Abyale
- "À la Bastille" by Aristide Bruant
- "À la Paris" by Rega Dance Orchestra (featuring the early jazz musician Nathan Glantz)
- "À la Parisienne (Love Theme of Paris)" by Dick Jacobs and his Orchestra
- "À la Pigalle" by Robb Johnson
- "À la Place Maubert" by Aristide Bruant
- "À la Roquette" by Aristide Bruant
- "À la Seine" by Léo Ferré
- "À la Villette" by Aristide Bruant
- "A Little Side Street in Paris" by James F. Hanley and Jack Stanley
- "A Map of Paris" by Brock Walsh
- "A Midnight in Paris" by Billy Strayhorn
- "A Morning in Paris" by Modern Jazz Quartet
- "À nous deux Paris" by Michel Fugain
- "À Paris" by Carlos Cano
- "À Paris" by Francis Lemarque
- "À Paris" by Line Renaud
- "À Paris" by Yves Montand
- "À Paris à trois fillettes" by King's Singers
- "À Paris, dans chaque Faubourg" by Maurice Chevalier
- "À Paris la nuit" by Michel Pagliaro
- "À Paris, les femmes ressemblent à des fleurs" by La Toya Jackson
- "À Paris sur Mer" by Michel Polnareff
- "À Paris Valentine" by Frank Chacksfield
- "À Paris y a-t-une Dame" by Mony Marc
- "A Place in Paris" by Michel Legrand
- "À Poissy" by Aristide Bruant
- "A Quiet Street in Paris" by JP Den Tex
- "A Rainy Night in Paris" by Chris de Burgh
- "A Room in Paris" by Ralph Young
- "À Saint-Germain-des-Prés" by Léo Ferré
- "À Saint-Lazare" by Colette Ritz
- "À Saint-Ouen" by Aristide Bruant
- "A Song for Europe" by Roxy Music
- "A Song for Paris" by Claudia Ligia Suteu
- "A Souvenir de Paris" by Anne Shelton
- "A Spirit Map of Montparnasse" by Bill Nelson
- "A Stranger in Paris" by Rudy Vallée
- "A Street Corner in Paris" by Raymond Scott Quintet
- "À travers Montmartre" by Demis Roussos
- "A Trip to Paris" (traditional country dance)
- "A Walk to Paris" by the Rainbows
- "Achter de Coulissen van Parijs" by Wendy van Wanten
- "Action" by Streetheart
- "Adieu Paris" by Lala
- "Adieu Paris" by l'Echo de nos Montagnes
- "Adieu, Paris (Adios Muchachos)" by Berthe Sylva
- "African in Paris" by Rozalla
- "After Paris - Tribute to Coleman Hawkins" by New York Jazz Quartet
- "Afternoon in Paris" by John Lewis
- "Ah Ah ça c'est joli - the Children of Paris" by Enoch Light
- "Ah! Ah! I'm Queen of Men, Parisienne, la fine fleur de Paris. Ah! Ah! Tout de même, je vous aime! Do You Care for Me?" from the musical The Dollar Princess
- "Ah! les p'tites femmes de Paris" by Brigitte Bardot And Jeanne Moreau
- "Ah! Paris" by Stephen Sondheim (from the musical 'Follies')
- "Ahoy Paris" by Georges Brassens
- "Aimer à Paris" by André Marc
- "Alexa de Paris" by Prince
- "Alhambra" by Daniel Colin
- "All Aboard for Paris" by Jacques Offenbach and Harry B. Smith
- "All over the World" by Electric Light Orchestra
- "All the Rage in Paris" by Jim Lauderdale
- "All the Way (With John Wayne's Single-Handed Liberation of Paris)" by Caravan
- "Alle Synger en sang om Paris" by Einar Holt
- "Allô Paris" by Mano Solo
- "Alma Marceau" by Richard Blareau et Son Orchestre
- "Alone in Paris" by Alphonse Mouzon
- "Along the Boulevards" by Ron Grainer & His Music
- "Américaine ou Parisienne" by Line Renaud
- "The American Girl in Paris" (from A Parisian Model)
- "An American in Paris" by George Gershwin
- "An Australian in Paris" by Brett Kelly
- "An Evening in Paris" by Johnny Long (musician)
- "Anatole of Paris" by Danny Kaye
- "Anclao en París" by Enrique Cadícamo
- "And Her Mother Came Too" by Ivor Novello
- "The Android of Notre Dame" by Buckethead
- "Angelique of the Opera Comique" from Vera Violetta
- "Another Song About Paris" by Dave Frishberg
- "Any Town Is Paris When You're Young" by Bing Crosby
- "Après la Bastille" by Mort Shuman
- "April in Paris" by Vernon Duke and Yip Harburg
- "April in Paris" by Trickster
- "Arc de Triomphe" by Teenage Panzerkorps
- "Arc de Triomphe Two-Step" by BeauSoleil
- "Arde París", by Ana Belén
- "Arms of Loren" by E'voke
- "Around the World" (from Around the World in 80 Days (1956 film))
- "As the Chef of a Swell Parisian Hotel, I Have Studied the Human Inside..." from The Belle of Brittany
- "Astor in Paris" by 3 Leg Torso
- "At a Perfume Counter on the rue de la Paix" by Dave Brubeck Quartet
- "At a Sidewalk Cafe (on the rue de la Pais)" by Stuart Foster
- "At the la Villa" by Teddy Edwards Quartet
- "At Longchamps Today" from the musical comedy Fifty Million Frenchmen
- "At Maxim's" by John Williams
- "At the Louvre" by Morton Gould
- "At Val d'Amour" from the musical Notre-Dame de Paris
- "At ze Naughty Folies Bergere" (from the musical The Belle of New York)
- "Atop the Sacre-Coeur" by Franck Pourcel
- "Attack of Notre-Dame" from the musical Notre-Dame de Paris
- "The Attack on the rue Plumet" from the musical Les Misérables
- "Au bal du Bataclan" by Zachary Richard
- "Au bois de Boulogne" Aristide Bruant
- "Au bois de mon coeur" by Georges Brassens
- "Aux Champs Elysées" by Joe Dassin
- "Au Moulin Rouge" by Gazebo
- "Au Palais Royal/Les Prostituées" from the musical 1789: les Amants de la Bastille
- "Au revoir Paris" by Trio Athenee
- "Auf dem Flohmarkt von Paris" by Sacha Distel
- "Auf der rue Madeleine in Paris" by Anny Ondra & Hans Söhnke
- "Auf Wiederseh'n Paris" by Severine
- "Autumn in Paris" by Peter Knight (composer)
- "Avenue de Bel Air" by Steve Howe
- "Avenue Henri Martin" by Georges Delerue et Alain Goraguer
- "Avenue l'Opera" by Sidney Lippman
- "Azure-Te (Paris Blues)" by Bill Davis and Don Wolf
- "Bachelor in Paris" by Bryan Johnson
- "Back in Paris" by Jahn Teigen
- "Back to Paris" by Bernheim
- "Back to Paris" by Red Baron
- "Bagatelle" by Eddie Brunner
- "Balalaika in Paris" by Peter Thomas (composer)
- "Ballad du Paris" by Francois Parisi
- "The Ballad of John and Yoko" by The Beatles
- "The Ballad of Lucy Jordan" by Dr Hook
- "Ballade dans Paris" by Pierre Gueyrard
- "Ballade de Paris" by Francis Lemarque
- "Ballade de Paris" by François Aceti
- "Ballade de St Eustache" by Vladimir Cosma
- "Ballade des Dames du Temps Jadis" by Georges Brassens
- "Ballade rue de la Paix" by Claude Bolling
- "Ballrooms of Versailles" by Army of Lovers
- "Banks of the Seine" by Bobby Parr
- "Banks of the Seine" by Frank Chacksfield
- "Bastille Day" by John Tesh
- "Bastille Day" by Rush
- "Bataclan" by The Cat Empire
- "Bateau Mouche" by Henry Mancini & His Orchestra
- "Beaubourg" by Vangelis
- "Being with You (In Paris)" by Steve Vai
- "The Bell Tower" from the Disney film The Hunchback of Notre Dame
- "Belle Belle My Liberty Belle" by Guy Mitchell
- "The Belle of St Mark" by Sheila E.
- "Belles of Paris" by Beach Boys
- "Belleville" by Django Reinhardt
- "Belleville-Ménilmontant" by Aristide Bruant
- "Bells of Notre Dame" by Dark Moor
- "The Bells of Notre Dame" by Eloy
- "The Bells of Notre Dame" from the Disney film The Hunchback of Notre Dame
- "The Bells of Notre Dame" by Notre Dame
- "The Bells of Notre Dame" by Paul Weston
- "Bells of Old Paris" by Kit Hain
- "Bells of Paris" by Modern Talking
- "Bibliothèque Mazarine" by Julien Clerc
- "Bienvenue à Paris" by Bill Baxter (band) & Tippa Irie
- "Bienvenue à Paris" by Chantal Goya
- "Big Eight" by Judge Dread
- "Black Paris Blues" by Mighty Mo Rodgers
- "Blame It on Paris" by Nelson Riddle
- "Blane over Paris" by Hatfield and the North
- "Bléu du Paris" by Bob Burgos (member of Matchbox (band)) and Iain Terry
- "Blowing in Paris" by Eddie Chamblee
- "Bluebottle Blues" by The Goons
- "Blues de Paris" by Blue Angels
- "Blues des Lombards" by Axel Zwingenberger
- "Blues For Montmartre" by Adrian Bentzon's New Orleans Orkester featuring Albert Nicholas
- "Blues for Ste Chapelle" by Gene Harris Quartet
- "Blues in Paris" by Sidney Bechet
- "Blues on the Champs-Elysees" by Joe Newman
- "Blues Parisien" by Clare Fischer
- "Bois de Boulogne" by Alex Renard et Son Orchestre
- "Bon-Bon de Paris" by Ray Martin (orchestra leader)
- "Bonjour, Mesdam's les Mariées" et Ronde des Halles "On peux chercher en tous pays" from Les p'tites Michu
- "Bonjour, Paris" by Audrey Hepburn, Fred Astaire, Kay Thompson
- "Bonjour Paris" by Francis Lemarque
- "Bonjour Paris" by Marc Aryan
- "Bonjour Paris" by Marcel Mouloudji
- "Bonjour Paris - Bonjour l'amour" by Astrid & Freddy Breck
- "Bonjour Paris (If Ever You Go to Paris)" by Sydney Bechet
- "Bon soir Mademoiselle Paris" by Olympic
- "Bonsoir, Paris" by Henri René & His Orchestra
- "Bon soir Paris, bonjour l'amour" by Angéle Durand
- "Bon Voyage" by Sherman Brothers
- "Bords de Seine" by l'Infanterie Sauvage
- "Bossa nova de Paris" by Michel Magne
- "Boulevard de la Madelaine" by Moody Blues
- "Boulevard de Magenta" by Chauncey Westbrook
- "Boulevard de Paris" by Andy Novello Orchestra
- "Boulevard des Capucines" by Etienne Daho
- "Boulevard du Crime" by Edith Piaf
- "Boulevard Sébastopol" by David McNeil
- "Boulevard St Michel" by Phil Tate and his Music
- "Boulevard St Michelle" by the World Over
- "The Boulevarde of Love (Champs Elysees)" by Hugo Winterhalter & His Orchestra
- "Boulevards de Paris" by Jacques Ysaye
- "Bourg-la-Reine" by Julien Clerc
- "Boy in Paris" by Diana Vickers
- "Break the Rules" by Status Quo (band)
- "Breath of Life - Rive Gauche" by Chorale
- "The Bridge of Caulaincourt" from the musical 'Irma la Douce'
- "Brooklyn-Paris (Transatlantikonexion)" by la Conspiration Featuring Widow Prizum (hip hop)
- "Brouillard sur Paris" by Jean-Claude Pelletier
- "By Paris, by Taxi, by Accident" by Bill Pritchard
- "By the Seine" by The Crookes
- "Bye Bye Paris" by Ray Collins' Hot Club
- "Ça balance pas mal à Paris" by France Gall & Michel Berger
- "Ça c'est Paris" (march) by Maestro Padilla, sung by Maurice Chevalier or Mistinguett
- "Ça c'est Paris" by Patrick Juvet
- "Cabaret Paris" by Zarah Leander
- "Café de Flore" by Doctor Rockit
- "Café Montparnasse" by Nina & Frederik
- "Cafe on the Left Bank" by Wings
- "Café Paris" by Henry Jerome
- "Cameras in Paris" by The Fixx
- "Camille's Story Part 1 - Childhood in Paris" by Jakko M. Jakszyk
- "Car Horns in Paris" by Hi Fi
- "Carnaval de Paris" by Dario G
- "Carnival in Paris" by Billy Vaughn & His Orchestra
- "Theme from 'The Cars That Ate Paris'" by Bruce Smeaton
- "Casatschok de Paris" by K Ramazov et ses frères
- "Casino de Paris" (from the musical Go into Your Dance)
- "Casino de Paris" by Angèle Durand
- "Casino de Paris" by Samantha
- "The Cathedral of Notre Dame" by Bob London
- "Cayenne" by Les amis d'ta femme
- "Ce jour là à Paris" by Jacqueline François
- "Ce matin là à Paris" by Jeane Manson
- "The Cellars of Paris" by The Eggheads
- "Cenando en París" by Mecano
- "C'est bien joli Paris" by Sandie Shaw
- "C'est chouette Paris" by Anthony Perkins
- "C'est la chanson de Paris" by Lucienne Delyle
- "C'est magnifique" by Santa Esmeralda
- "C'est Paris" by Maurice Chevalier
- "C'est si bon (So fühlt man Paris)" by Mireille Mathieu
- "C'est toujours ça de Paris" by Ray Ventura & ses collégiens
- "Cha Cha Cha de Paris" by Marcel Hayes and his Orchestra
- "Cha Cha Cha in Paris" by Mara del Rio
- "Chamonix et Paris" by Fredrik Saroea & the Fredrik Saroeas
- "Champ Elisées" by Mario Piu
- "Champs Elysee" by Curtis Knight
- "Champs Élysées" by The Adicts
- "Champs Elysees" by Alec Wishart with the Society Jazzmen
- "Champs Elysees" by Andy Sundstrom
- "Champs Elysees" by DiVersion
- "Champs Elysees" by Eric Dolphy with the Chico Hamilton Quintet
- "Champs Élysées" by Jean-Claude Petit Orchestra
- "Champs Élysées" by Jerry Rix
- "Champs Élysées" by John Ireland
- "Champs Elysées" by la Musique de la Garde Républicaine
- "Champs Elysées" by London
- "Champs Elysees" by Lou Breese
- "The Champs Elysees" by Mrs Mills
- "Champs Elysées" by Ray Anthony
- "Champs Elysées" by Sonja Salvis
- "Champs Elysees" by Suns of Arqa
- "Champs Elysées" by Till Brönner
- "Champs Elysées" by Yves Montand
- "Champs-Elysées Club" by Hubert Rostaing
- "Champs Elysées Theme" by Bob Sinclair
- "Champs Elyses [sic]" by Money Boy
- "Charanga in Paris" by l'African Team de Paris
- "Charleston Parisien" by Guy Lombardo and his Royal Canadians
- "Charming Madmoiselle from Paris, France" by Lou Busch and His Orchestra
- "Chase to Orly Airport" from the original soundtrack of That Man from Rio
- "Chez Maximes" by Hollywood Brats
- "The Chimes of Notre Dame" by Horace Heidt
- "Choisy le roi" by East of Eden
- "Christmas in Paris" by Johnny Kaye
- "Christmas in Paris" by Jackie Gleason
- "Ciao, Ciao Paris" by Angeleri
- "Ciel de Paris" by Jean Sablon
- "Cinerama Holiday (Souvenirs of Paris)" by Morton Gould
- "Clean Shirt in Paris" by The Nits
- "Climbing Eiffel Tower" by Frank "Dual Trumpet" Motley
- "Clichy" by Andy Sundstrom
- "Cloches de Notre-Dame" by Léo Ferré
- "The Clown on the Eiffel Tower" by Les Baxter
- "Club le Narciss" by Malcolm McLaren
- "Cocktails Champs Elysees" by Pierre Duval and His Orchestra
- "Coeur de Parisienne" by Rufus Wainwright
- "Color in Your Cheeks" by The Mountain Goats
- "Continental Train" by A Moviescript Ending
- "Couleurs sur Paris" by Oberkampf
- "Comment ça va" by René Simard
- "Complainte de la Butte" by Rufus Wainwright
- "Complainte de Paris" by Peter Moore
- "Complainte des mystères de Paris" by Vladimir Cosme
- "Contrescarpe serenade" by Les Pieds de Poule
- "The Coster Girl in Paris" by Marie Lloyd
- "Cote Seine" by Steve Cole
- "Country Girl in Paris" by John Denver
- "Cowboy in Paris (Chacun fait...)" by Stu Stevens
- "Crazy Paris" by Horny United
- "Cross My Heart" by Eighth Wonder
- "Crystal's" by Zoot Sims
- "Daddy" by Sammy Kaye
- "Dallas-sur-Seine" by les Invendables
- "Damals in Paris" by Tino Marcel
- "Dancin' at the Bains D" by Kid Creole and the Coconuts
- "Dancing in Paris" by Angel
- "Dancin' on the rue de Rivoli" by Diana Harris
- "Dans la salle du bar tabac de la rue des Martyrs" by Pigalle
- "Dans Paris" by Benjamin Biolay
- "Dans les Musettes de Paris" by l'Orchestre Alexander (featuring Django Reinhardt)
- "Dans les rues de Paris" by Powersolo
- "Dans les squares" by Les Wriggles
- "Dans mon Paris" by Zaz
- "Dans Paris y a-t-une brune" by Joseph Saucier
- "Dansant dans Paris" by The Tangent
- "Das hab' ich in Paris gelernt" by Chris Howland
- "Daughter of the Latin Quarter" by Noble Sissle and His Sizzling Syncopators
- "A Day Out of Paris" by Ash Can School
- "De Bedelaar van Parijs" by Jerry & Mary Bey
- "De Paris à Brasilia" by Joss Baselli & Tony Rallo
- "Dear Old Moulin Rouge" music by Jean Schwartz and Sigmund Romberg; lyrics by Harold Atteridge and Tot Seymour
- "Dédé de Montmartre" by Émile Prud'Homme
- "Deja Vu (Parisian Whore)" by Lori Wray
- "Démocratisation de l'Elysée" by Paul Barré
- "Den Siste Tango I Paris" by Ray Adams (singer)
- "Der Duft von Paris" by Séverine
- "Der Pariser Tango" by Mireille Mathieu
- "Der Playboy aus Paris" by Britta Martell
- "Der Student von Paris" by Margot Eskens
- "Der Zauber von Paris" by Peter Alexander
- "Dernière danse" by Indila
- "Destination Paris" by John Tesh
- "I det glade Paris" by Bertrand Bech
- "Det lærte jeg meg i Paris (Das hab' ich in Paris gelernt)" by Nora Brockstedt
- "Diane de Montrouge" by Nino Ferrer
- "Die Dolly von den Folies Bergére" by Harald Juhnke
- "Die feinen Leute von Paris" by Ines Taddio
- "Die Glocken von Notre Dame" by Mireille Mathieu
- "Die Kinder vom Montparnasse" by Mireille Mathieu
- "Die schönen Mädchen von Paris" by Sacha Distel
- "Die Spatzen von Paris" by Jacqueline Boyer
- "Dimanche à Orly" by Gilbert Bécaud
- "Dis, Paris" by Mouloudji
- "Django Reinhardt Swings on the Paris Metro" by Pete Bax
- "Do This My Way" by Kid 'n Play
- "Do You Want to See Paris?" from the musical comedy Fifty Million Frenchmen
- "Dodo Métro Boulot Dodo" by Zoo
- "Dolly from the Folies Bergére" by Victor Young and Edward Heyman
- "Donne-Moi Paris" by Leo Marjane
- "Don't Say Paris, Say Paris" by Gene Kelly from the musical puppet show Les Poupées de Paris
- "Don't Wait 'Til It's Too Late to See Paris" from the musical revue New Faces of '56'
- "The Doors of Paris" (from the musical Notre-Dame de Paris)
- "Douala Paris" by Kraked Unit
- "(Down at) the Follies Bergére", music by Silvio Hein, lyrics by George V. Hobart
- "Down by the Seine" by Coalminers Beat
- "Down in the Seine" by Style Council
- "Down to the Folies Bergere" by Irving Berlin
- "The Downfall of Paris" by Eugene O'Donnell
- "Dread in a Paris" by Mosiah (reggae)
- "Dreaming of Paris" by Van Dyke Parks
- "Dreams of Paris" by Irving Fields Trio
- "Dreamy Montmartre" by Abel Baer, Joe Young (lyricist) and Sam M. Lewis
- "Drei Bayern in Paris" by Die 3 lustigen Moosacher
- "Du" by Cro (singer)
- "Du haut du Sacré Coeur" by John William
- "Duft af Paris" by Bent Fabric
- "Early in Paris" by Erroll Garner
- "East Coast to Paris" by Free Form Funky Freqs
- "East Thirty-Second" by Lennie Tristano
- "Easter Sorbonne" by The Bathers
- "Echoes of Paris" by George Feyer
- "Ein Weekend in Paris" by Jacqueline Boyer
- "Eiffeltoren Melodie" by Stan Haag
- "Eiffel Tower" by Jad Fair
- "Eiffel Tower" by Malcolm McLaren
- "The Eiffel Tower" by The Nits
- "Eiffel Tower" by Sammy Price
- "Eiffel Tower Blue" by Elliott Murphy
- "Eiffel Tower Blues" by Dino Rossi and His Orchestra
- "Eiffel Tower High" by Hüsker Dü
- "Eiffeltown" by Vico Torriani
- "Eine Frau aus Paris" by Caterina Valente
- "El Fenix De Paris" by Luis de Briceño
- "Elle frequentait la rue Pigalle" by Edith Piaf
- "Elysees" by John Lewis (pianist)
- "En avril à Paris" by Charles Trenet
- "En flanant dans Paris" by Guy Marchand
- "En parlant un peu de Paris" by André Dassary
- "En Regardant Paris" by Mick Micheyl
- "En sang om Paris" by Birger Højland
- "Entre Pigalle et Blanche" by Patachou
- "Entre Saint-Ouen et Clignancourt" by Edith Piaf
- "Er macht Musik am Montparnasse" by Angèle Durand
- "Es gibt nur ein Paris" by Peter Alexander
- "Escaleras de Montmartre" by Julio Viera
- "Escape to Paris" (from the film 'Interview With the Vampire')
- "Eternity in Paris" by Clock DVA
- "Étudiant des Beaux Arts, What Though Posterity May Give Unto Your Honour'd Name..." from the musical comedy The School Girl
- "Evening in Paris" by The Packabeats
- "Evening in Paris" by Quincy Jones
- "Evening in Paris" by Victor Feldman
- "Farewell to Paris" by Erroll Garner
- "Faubourg Saint Martin" by Yves Montand
- "The Feeling of Paris" by Mary Kaye Trio
- "Femmes de Paris" by Nicoletta
- "Fete de Paris" from the Japanese revue Mon Paris
- "Fille de Paris" by de Electronicas
- "Filthy Paris" by Providence
- "Fings Ain't Wot They Used t'Be" by Max Bygraves
- "Flamenco de Paris" by Yves Montand
- "Flames of Paris" by Boris Asafyev
- "Flea Markets of Paris" by Henry Jerome
- "Fleur de Paris" by Maurice Chevalier
- "Fleur de Seine" by Yves Montand
- "Flight from Versailles" by Grand Tour
- "Flight to Paris" by Kai
- "Florence sur les Champs-Elysées" by Miles Davis
- "Flying at the Olympia" by Lionel Hampton
- "Folies Bergere" by Adriano
- "Folies Bergere" by Nina Carter
- "Folies Bergere" by Paul Lincke
- "Folies-Bergère: Overture Theme "Folies-Bergère" by Jacques Ysaye
- "Folies Bergères" by Sarane Ferret et Le Swing Quintette de Paris
- "Folies Bergères (Opening Chorus)" by Raymond Scott
- "The Follies of Paris" by Jacques Ysayse and His Orchestra
- "Follow the Seine" by Albert Marland Orchestra
- "Fort Chabrol" by Les Fantomes
- "Fountainbleu" by Charlie Callelo
- "Fountainbleu" by Tadd Dameron
- "The Fountains of Versailles" by Joan Talcroft
- "Four O`Clock les Halles" by Franck Pourcel
- "Free Man in Paris" by Joni Mitchell
- "Free Suite for Paris" by Jaki Byard Trio
- "The French Can Can Polka" by the Radio Revellers
- "French Kiss" by Claudia Ligia Suteu
- "French Kissing in the USA" by Debbie Harry
- "From Baltimore to Paris" by Go West
- "From Paris to Berlin" by Infernal
- "Frühling in Paris" by Rammstein
- "Fue en Paris" by Omar Sosa
- "Funky Paris" by Gilbert Montagné
- "Gaite Parisienne" by Jacques Offenbach
- "Galop Longchamps" by Paul Mayer (Adriano)
- "Ganz in der Näh' von den Champs-Elysées" by Jacqueline Boyer
- "Ganz Paris ist ein Theater" by Mireille Mathieu
- "Ganz Paris träumt von der Liebe" by Caterina Valente
- "Garden in Versailles" by Ken Sykora and Ike Isaacs
- "Gare de Lyon" by Barbara
- "Gare de Lyon" by Cropduster
- "Gare de Lyon" by Dosh
- "Gare de Lyon" by Fredrik Saroea & the Fredrik Saroeas
- "Gare du Nord (Paris Metro #1) by Django Reinhardt
- "Gay Paris" by Henry Mancini
- "The Gay Paris" by Patrick Juvet
- "Gay Parisienne" by Kathryn Grayson And Tony Martin
- "Gens de Paris" by Le Big Bazar
- "Gentille fille très belle du Métro' by Francis Lai
- "Georgina Bailey" by Noosha Fox
- "Gi I Fi' I Name" by Pablo Moses
- "The Girl from Paris" from The Gay Parisienne
- "The Girl Who Lived in Montparnasse" from the musical Show Girl
- "The Girls at Maxim's" from the operetta The Merry Widow
- "The Girls in Paris" by Lee Hazlewood
- "The Girls of Paris" by Helmuth Brandenburg Orchestra
- "The Girls of Gay Par--ee" by George Fischoff
- "Girls of the Folies Bergere" by Craig Anders
- "Give Me the Night (Love in Paris)" by Kenny Knight
- "Give Paris One More Chance" by Jonathan Richman
- "Glad to Be Back from Paris" by Jonas Hellborg
- "Goblin" by Tyler, the Creator
- "Goin' to Paris" by Hungry John
- "Going to Paris" by The Waterboys
- "Good Morning Paris" by Dan Marciano
- "Good Paris" by Sammy Price
- "Gosse de Paris" by Charles Aznavour
- "Grand Imperial Cirque de Paris" from the musical Carnival
- "Grands Boulevards" by Yves Montand
- "Gripshitrider in Paris" by Les Rita Mitsouko
- "Groove from the Louvre" by Gil Evans
- "Groovin' in Paris" by Willie James Lyons
- "Growing Up in Paris" by John Williams
- "Guaguancó de Veró" by Stephen Stills, Manassas
- "Guess Who I Saw in Paris" by Buffy Sainte-Marie
- "Gustave Cafe" by Bill Pritchard
- "Häftig Tango I Paris" by Anita Lindblom
- "Half of the Population of Paris" by Tony Martin (American singer)
- "Happy Days in Paris" by George Feyer (pianist)
- "The Happy Elf (Gay Paris)" by John Van Horn & His Orchestra
- "The Happy Heart of Paris" by Dorothy Collins
- "He Went to Paris" by Jimmy Buffett
- "Heart of Paris (Coeur de Mon Coeur)" by Don Costa
- "Helen Loves Paris" by Colin Blunstone
- "Hello, Paris! (Retour à Paris)" by Shirley Abicair
- "Henri Porte des Lilas" by Philippe Timsit
- "Here We Are You See, in Our Dear Paris; All Is Love and Laughter..." from the musical comedy The Spring Chicken
- "Hinter den Kulissen von Paris" by Mireille Mathieu
- "Hjertet Paris" by Nora Brockstedt
- "Home Is Where the Heart Is" by Gladys Knight and the Pips
- "Homesick in Paris" by Morgana King
- "Höst I en Park I Paris" by Thory Bernhards
- "Hot Nights in Paris" by Sandy McLelland & the Backline
- "Hot Paris Latino" by Bandelero
- "Hôtel Biron - Chambre 22" by Véronique Sanson
- "Hotel Bristol" by Palm Court Theatre Orchestra
- "Hôtel du Nord" by Rene Cambien
- "Hôtel du Nord" by Mark Feldman
- "Hôtel particulier" by Les Rita Mitsouko
- "How Beautiful You Are" by The Cure
- "How 'Ya Gonna Keep 'Em Down on the Farm? (After They've Seen Paris)" by Walter Donaldson
- "Hum Drum Boys in Paris" by Godley & Creme
- "Hunchback of Notre Dame" by Frantic Elevators
- "The Hunchback of Notre Dame" by Alec R. Costandinos
- "The Hunchback of Notre Dame" by The Alexander Rabbit
- "Hunch Back of the Notre-Dame" by Tranzam
- "Hunting on Paris" by Salon Music
- "I det glade Paris" by Jens Warny
- "I Dreamt I Was Back in Paris" by Georges Guétary
- "I Left My Heart in San Francisco" by Tony Bennett
- "I Love Life, Men, Candy & Paris" by the Zanies
- "I Love Paris" by Alpha Blondy
- "I Love Paris" by Cole Porter
- "I Love Paris" by Riviera Splash
- "I Love ze Parisienne" by Victor Herbert
- "I Made You Love Paris" by Mary Lou Williams
- "I Met Her in Paris" by Jimmy Jimmy
- "I Never Got Out of Paris" by Sammy Davis Jr
- "I Never Got to Paris" by Robert Goulet
- "I Predict" by Sparks
- "I Want to Go to Paris" (music by Silvio Hein; lyrics by George V. Hobart)
- "I Will Return to Paris" by Cootie Williams
- "Ich möchte auch mal nach Paris" by Ilse Werner
- "Ich zeig' Dir mein Paris" by Severine
- "Idle Rock-a-Boogie" by Anthony Newley
- "If You Leave Paris" by Mabel Mercer
- "Il est cinq heures, Paris s'éveille" by Jacques Dutronc
- "Il n'y a qu' à Paris" by Rita Cadillac
- "Il Pleut À Paris" by PLK
- "Il pleut sur les tuyaux de Beaubourg" by Pierre Gueyrard
- "Il y a 2 jours que je suis à Paris" by Sylvie Vartan
- "I'll Meet You at Midnight" by Smokie
- "I'm All the Way from Gay Paris" from The Gay Parisienne
- "I'm Glad That Paris Pleases You ... It Charms Me Altogether" (from An Artist's Model)
- "I'm Headin' for Paris" by Jonah Jones
- "I'm in Favour of Friendship" by Bob Hilliard and David Mann (songwriter)
- "I'm the Milliner Monarch of Paris" from The Duchess of Dantzic
- "I'm Throwing My Arms Around Paris" by Morrissey
- "Im Café de la Paix in Paris" by Peter Alexander
- "The Imp of Montmartre" by Sigmund Romberg; lyrics by Harold Atteridge
- "Impressions of Paris" by Barney Wilen & Philippe Petit
- "In and Out of Love-Taxi to Paris" by Bitty McLean
- "In der kleinen Bar auf dem Grand-Boulevard" by Jacqueline Boyer
- "In een klein Cafe bij Parijs" by Harmonika-Duo Frans van Capelle
- "In Gay Paris" from The Monks of Malabar
- "In Old Versailles" by Louis Hirsch, Gene Buck and Rennold Wolf
- "In Paris" by Jane Morgan
- "In Paris" by Gustave Kerker and R.H. Burnside
- "In Paris" by Julie Felix
- "In Paris" by Martine Kelly
- "In Paris" (from the musical revue The Streets of Paris)
- "In Paris" by Téléphone
- "In Paris After the War" by Boo Hewerdine
- "In Paris am Place Pigalle" by Ralf Paulsen
- "In Paris and in Love" by Toni Arden
- "In Paris brennen Autos" by Faber
- "In Paris, in der rue Madeleine" by Vico Torriani
- "In Paris, in Love" by Steve Race & His Orchestra
- "In Paris ist es schön" by Vico Torriani
- "In Paris Ringsumher" by Joe Dassin and the Schöneberger Sängerknaben
- "In Paris sind die Mädels so süß" by Peter Alexander
- "In the Absence of the Parisienne" by Malcolm McLaren
- "In the Heart of Old Paris" (from Playboy of Paris)
- "In the Park in Paris" by Billy Cotton
- "In Versailles in dem großen Garten" by Joe Dassin
- "Incident In Paris" by The Outcasts
- "Influences" by Mike Hart
- "In 't hartje van Parijs" by Imca Marina
- "Intermezzo from Notre Dame" by Franz Schmidt
- "Internationally Known" by Grandmaster Melle Mel & the Furious Five
- "Is It Possible: A Moment in Montmartre" from the musical revue The Streets of Paris
- "Is It Raining in Paris Tonight" by Bagatelle
- "It Ain't Necessarily Bird Avenue" by Spanky and Our Gang
- "It Wasn't Paris, It Was You" by Nancy Holloway
- "It's a Long Way to Paris" by Steve Miro & the Eyes
- "It's Nice to go Trav'ling" by Sammy Cahn and Jimmy Van Heusen
- "It's Paris" by Le Roy And Wally
- "It's Raining in Paris Tonight" by Bagatelle
- "I've Had Enough of Paris, So I Think That You and I Just Out of Town Will Settle Down..." from The Belle of Brittany
- "I've Just Come Back from Paris to Spend a Week at Home" from Kissing Time
- "I've Seen That Face Before (Libertango)" by Grace Jones
- "Jack the Ripper in the Moulin Rouge" by John Cale
- "J'adore la France" by Victor Johnson
- "J'adore Paris" by Linda Newton
- "J'ai deux amours" (Mon pays et Paris)" by Josephine Baker
- "J'aime bien Paris" by Hazel Scott
- "J'aime Paris" by Pierre Gueyrard
- "J'aime Paris au mois de mai" by Charles Aznavour
- "Janie Goes to Paris" by Nu-Moodie Judah
- "Janine (Complainte de Paris)" by Eddy Marnay and Emil Stern, performed by Al Hirt
- "January in Paris" by Helen McCookerybook
- "Japan to Paris in L.A." by The Red Krayola
- "The Japanese Room at la Pagode" by Gastr Del Sol
- "Java de Pigalle" by Jo Courtin
- "Jazz Is Paris" by Malcolm McLaren
- "Je marche dans les rues de Paris" by Louis Chedid
- "Je ne suis plus Parisienne" by Nicole Louvier
- "Je suis à la gare de Lyon" by System Shock
- "Je suis le charme de Paris! In English That Will Be Personified Paris!" from the musical comedy The New Aladdin
- "Je suis venu vous voir" by Mano Solo
- "Je t'aime tant Paris" by Bobbejaan Schoepen
- "Jenny Goes to Paris" by Moodie (reggae)
- "Jerk à Saint-Germain" by Louis Peña et son Orchestre
- "Jim Morrison's Grave" by Steve Taylor
- "Joe le Taxi" by Vanessa Paradis
- "Johnny Pigalle" by Regine
- "Jolies mômes de mon quartier" by Charles Aznavour
- "Josephine Baker" by Sailor
- "Josephine Superstar - Medley: Saint Louis/Broadway/Star of Paris" by Phylicia Allen
- "Julia Before Paris" by Venus in Furs
- "July in Paris" by Jaki Byard Trio
- "Jumpin' at Pleyel" by Bill Coleman
- "Just What I Always Wanted" by Mari Wilson
- "Justify My Love" by Madonna
- "Kiki of Montparnasse" by Leo O'Kelly
- "King of Paris" by Jo Stafford
- "Kip in Parijs" by Seth Gaaikema
- "La Ballade de Paris" by Yves Montand
- "La Ballade des rues de Paris" by Josephine Baker
- "La Bastille" by Jacques Brel
- "La Bastille" (from Les chansons d'amour)
- "La belle Paris", music by A. Baldwin Sloane, John Stromberg and W.T. Francis, lyrics by Edgar Smith
- "La belle Parisienne" from the musical The Belle of New York
- "La belle Parisienne, music by Louis Hirsch, lyrics by Edward Madden
- "La Chanson des fortifs" by Fréhel
- "La Cigale" by Harry Cooper
- "La Complainte de la Seine" by Lys Gauty
- "La Complainte de l'heure de pointe (À velo dans Paris)" by Joe Dassin
- "La Complainte de Paris" by Claude Goaty
- "La Complainte de Paris" by Marcel Mouloudji
- "La Defense" by Mirco Violi & Hooved
- "La Flamenco de Paris" by Leo Ferre
- "La Goutte D'Or" by St Germain (musician)
- "La grande cité" by Yves Montand
- "La joie des rues de Paris" by Jacques Poubeau
- "La mer à Paris" by Bagatelle
- "La main Parisienne" by Malcolm McLaren
- "La Parisienne" by Christiane Legrand
- "La Parisienne" by Mitzi Gaynor
- "La Parisienne" by Nick Perito
- "La Parisienne" by Vicki Beneta
- "La Pigalle" by John Critchinson
- "La Prise de la Bastille" from the musical 1789: Les Amants de la Bastille
- "La Romance de Paris" by Charles Trenet
- "La Route de Paris" by Jean-Jacques Clot
- "La Route de Paris" by Marcelle Bordas
- "La Rue Beaurepaire" by Andy White (singer-songwriter)
- "La Rue de notre Amour" by Marie-Louise Damien
- "La Rue Saint Denis" by Les Trois Ménestrels
- "La Seine" (French accordion tune)
- "La Seine" by Shazz
- "La Seine & I" by Vanessa Paradis & -M-
- "La Seine et la tamise" by Petula Clark
- "La Sorbonne" by Mirco Violi & Hooved
- "La Tour Eiffel" by Christine Ng
- "La Traversée De Paris" by Michael Nyman
- "La Vie parisienne" by Jacques Offenbach
- "La Vie Parisienne" by Jean Schwartz and Alfred Bryan
- "La Vie parisienne (Rondeau du Brésilien)" by Michel Ramos
- "La Villette" by Marcus Miller
- "L'Air de Paris" by Claude Goaty
- "L'Amour à la française" by Les Fatals Picards
- "L'Amour dans le Metro" by Fredrik Saroea & the Fredrik Saroeas
- "L'Amour de Paris" by Mireille Mathieu
- "L'Automne à Paris" by Anthony Perkins
- "L'autre nuit, dans Paris" by Jose Salcy
- "L'Avenue des Marronniers" by Claude Barzotti
- "The Lady of Paris" by Clinton King & the Virginia Mountaineers
- "The Largest Movie House in Paris" by Malcolm McLaren
- "Last Disco in Paris" by the Partners
- "Last Mango in Paris" by Jimmy Buffett
- "Last Night in Paris" by Ken Nicol & Chris White
- "Last Night in Paris" by Moám Featuring Alice
- "Last Night in Paris" by Rale Bennett
- "Last Tango in Paris" by Marlena Shaw
- "The Last Time I Saw Paris" by Jerome Kern and Oscar Hammerstein II
- "Last Time in Paris" by Queensrÿche
- "The Latest Thing from Paris" from The Firefly
- "Latin Quarter" (from the musical Gold Diggers in Paris)
- "Latin Quarter" by Kenny Ball & His Jazzmen
- "Latin Quarter" by Laurie Johnson
- "Lazing on a Sunday Afternoon" by Queen
- "Le Balayeur de l' Olympia" by Jose Salcy
- "Le Bateau-Mouche" by David McNeil
- "Le Boulevard St. Germain" by Leslie Drayton Orchestra
- "Le Bouquiniste des bords de Seine" by Pierre Gueyrard
- "Le Breakfast Club de Paris" by Giacomo bondi & Roberto Picemi
- "Le Champs Elysee" by Bobby Charles
- "Le Chanteur du Grand Café" by Patrick Juvet
- "Le Chat Noir" by Aristide Bruant
- "Le Chevalier de Paris" by Edith Piaf
- "Le Diable de la Bastille" by Edith Piaf
- "Le Dome" by Neil Schon
- "Le Fado de Paris (O Fado Veio a Paris)" by Amalia Rodrigues
- "Le Feutre taupé" by Charles Aznavour
- "Le Fiacre" by Jean Sablon
- "Le Gamin d'Paris" by Yves Montand
- "Le Gars de Rochechouart" by Henri Salvador
- "Le Génie de la Bastille" by Ricet-Barrier
- "Le Grand Café" by Charles Trenet
- "Le Grand Escalier de Montmartre" by Pierre Gueyrard
- "Le Guinche" by Michel Legrand
- "Le Jardin du Luxembourg" by Joe Dassin
- "Le Long des rues de Paris" by Mouloudji
- "Le Mal de Paris" by Marcel Mouloudji
- "Le Marais" by Shazz
- "Le Metro" by Haira
- "Le Métro de Paris" by Edith Piaf
- "Le Metro de Paris" by Giacomo Bondi
- "Le Mobile Parisien" by P. Barré et Tout la Compagnie
- "Le Moineau de Paris" from La Cigüena de Zaragoza by Birth Control
- "Le Monsieur du Métro" by Marie-Josée Neuville
- "Le Parisien" by Gim-Mix Featuring Danielle Deneuve
- "Le Petit Musée de Montmartre" by Pierre Gueyrard
- "Le Petit Pont" by Juliette Gréco
- "Le Poinçonneur des Lilas" by Serge Gainsbourg
- "Le Pont de l'Alma" by Dani (singer)
- "Le Pont Marie" by Juliette Gréco
- "Le Pont Mirabeau" by Desireless
- "Le Pont Mirabeau" by Léo Ferré
- "Le Pont Mirabeau" by Marc Lavoine
- "Le Pont Mirabeau" by Marcel Mouloudji
- "Le Printemps à Paris" by Jacqueline Taïeb
- "Le Rêve Parisien" by les Invendables
- "Le Rhythme de Paris" by Jacques Pills
- "Le Soleil de Pigalle" by Jacqueline François & Claude Bolling
- "Le Souris de Paris" by Edgar Kermont
- "Le Tango de Paris" by Berthe Sylva
- "Le Temps des cathedrales" from the musical Notre Dame de Paris
- "Le Violoniste des Batignolles" by Pierre Gueyrard
- "Leaves on the Seine" by David Lanz
- "Leaving for Paris No. 2" by Rufus Wainwright
- "Leaving Paris" by Craig Armstrong
- "Left Bank" by Air
- "Left Bank" by Bud Shank
- "Left Bank" by Shorty Rogers
- "The Left Bank (C'est à Hambourg)" by Winifred Atwell
- "Left Bank" by Yukihiro Takahashi
- "The Left Bank" by Riuichi Sakamoto & Robin Scott (singer)
- "Left Bank Blues" by Joey Dee and the Starliters
- "Left Bank Express" by Maynard Ferguson
- "Left Bank Lovers" by Pierre Duval And His Orchestra
- "Left Bank Polka" by André Popp
- "Left Bank Swing" by Erroll Garner
- "Left Bank Two" by The Noveltones
- "Les Amants de Ménilmontant" by Hubert Giraud
- "Les Brumes de Chatou" by Triangle
- "Les Champs-Élysées" by Joe Dassin
- "Les Champs Élysées" by Willie Nile
- "Les Doriss Girls" (from the stageshow 'Moulin Rouge')
- "Les Filles de Paris (The Girls of Paris)" by Caterina Valente
- "Les Filles de Paris" by Paul Anka
- "Les Filles du Palais Royal" by Ursuline Kairson
- "Les Filles du Paris" by Johnny Hallyday
- "Les Grands Magasins" by Jean Constantin
- "Les Halles" by Diane Langton
- "Les Halles de Paris" by Les Frères Jacques
- "Les Mariés de la Tour Eiffel" (ballet first performed in 1921)
- "Les Matins de Paris" by Teki Latex & Lio
- "Les Moineaux de Paris" by Mireille Mathieu
- "Les Momes de la Cloches" by Aristide Bruant
- "Les Momes de Mon Quartier" by Yves Montand
- "Le Moulin de la Galette" by Lucienne Delyle
- "Les Mysteres de Paris" by Vladimir Cosma
- "Les Nuits de Saint-Germain-des-Prés" by Django Reinhardt
- "Les Paris" by Dani (singer)
- "Les Parisiennes" by Claude Bolling
- "Les Parisiens" by Jo Courtin
- "Les Pepées de Paris" (accordion tune)
- "Les Petites Femmes de Paris" by Barney Wilen Quartet
- "Les Photos de Doisneau" by Pierre Gueyrard
- "Les Pierrots de Paris/Ballet des pierrots de Paris" by Chantal Goya
- "Les Pigeons de Paris" by Eric Damien
- "Les Porches de Notre-Dame" by Maneige
- "Les Poupées de Paris" from the musical puppet show Les Poupées de Paris
- "Les Prénoms de Paris" by Jacques Brel
- "Les Puces de St-Ouen" by Pierre Gueyrard
- "Les Quais de la Seine" by Lucienne Delyle
- "Les Soirées Parisiennes" by Louise Attack
- "Les Sourires de Paris" by Danielle Darrieux
- "Les Versaillais sont à Passy" by Mort Shuman
- "Let Me Show You Paris" music by Max Hoffmann, lyrics by George Bronson-Howard and Harold Atteridge
- "Let's Go to Paris" by Allan Taylor
- "Let's Tango in Paris" by The Stranglers
- "L'Heure Parisienne" by Noel Gay
- "L'Histoire de la tour de M. Gustave" by Pierre Gueyrard
- "L'Hotel Ideal" by Bill Pritchard
- "L'Homme de Paris" by Mireille Mathieu
- "The Liberation" by Maurice Jarre (from the film 'Is Paris Burning?')
- "Liberation de Bastille" by Ras Tony Gad (reggae)
- "Liberté de Paris" by Charles Trenet
- "L'Île-de-France by Petula Clark
- "L'Île Saint-Louis" by les Escholiers de la Cité
- "Life Does a Man a Favor (When it Puts Him in Paris)" from the musical comedy Oh, Captain!
- "Life Is a Minestrone" by 10cc
- "The Lights of Paris" by Cidny Bullens
- "Lights of Paris" by Eileen Wilson
- "Lights of Paris" by Lee Lawrence
- "Lights of Paris" by The Troubadors
- "Lilian in Paris" by Georges Delerue
- "Lilla Paris" (from 'Frida's Book' by Birger Sjöberg)
- "Little Cafe Paris" by Vic Damone
- "Little Paris Melody" by the Blazers featuring Dave "Baby" Cortez
- "The Little Sparrow of Paris" by Pepe Jaramillo
- "Live in Paris" by BoyNextDoor
- "Llevame a Paris" by Sherman Brothers
- "L'Olympia" by Sheila (singer)
- "Lobo-Hombre en Paris" by la Union
- "Loin de Paris" by Francis Lai
- "London-Paris" by Gazebo
- "London-Paris" by Pizzicato Five
- "London Paris Rome Blues Express" by Ram Jam Holder
- "Lonely Night in Paris" by Julie London
- "Longchamp" by Daniel Faure
- "Lost in Paris" by Bill Wolfer
- "Lost in Paris" by Fred Ventura
- "Louise från Paris" by the Jackpots
- "Loulou de la Vache Noire" by Roger Riffard
- "The Louvre" by Sparks
- "Louxor j'adore" by Philippe Katerine
- "Love and Paris Rain" by Yellowjackets
- "Love In The Banlieues" by Jah Wobble and Marconi Union
- "The Love of Paris" by Pierre Legendre and the Paris International Orchestra
- "Love on the Seine" by Pierre Duval And His Orchestra
- "Love Theme from 'Is Paris Burning?'" by Doc Severinsen and his Orchestra
- "Lovely Love de Paris" by Demis Roussos
- "Lovers in Paris" by Monia Liter
- "Lovers of Paris" by Benedict Silberman & His Chorus & Orchestra
- "Low Down in Paris" by Ram Jam Holder
- "Luna Park" by Yves Montand
- "The Lure of the Night with the Ile de France on the Horizon", music by Lee David and Maury Rubens, lyrics by J. Keirn Brennan and Moe Jaffe
- "Lush Life" by Billy Strayhorn
- "Madame Loubet à bal de l'hôtel de ville Paris" by Bernard Lavalette
- "Made in Paris" by Trini Lopez
- "Mademoiselle Cliche de Paris" from Coco (musical)
- "Mademoiselle de Paris" by Frank Chacksfield & His Orchestra
- "Mademoiselle de Paris" by Harry Herman
- "Mademoiselle de Paris in Tirol" by Jacqueline Boyer
- "Maharanee (At the Night Races in Paris)" from Ziegfeld Follies of 1936
- "Maigret's Paris" by London Film Orchestra
- "Mais Oui" by The King Brothers
- "Malesherbes Square" by Dany Kane Quartet
- "Mambo de Paris" by Eartha Kitt
- "Mambo en Paris" by Ricardo Ray
- "Mambo Parisienne" by Henry Mancini & His Orchestra
- "Mañanitas de Montmartre" by Carmen Cavallaro
- "Manbijou aus Paris" by Lys Assia
- "Mannequin aus Paris" by Vito Torriani
- "Marche Militaire (Danse Parisian)" by Owen Hall, W. H. Risque and Leslie Stuart
- "March of the Parisian Bakers" by Hal Schaefer
- "March to Paris" by Bud Powell
- "Marche de la 2e d.b. sur Paris" by Maurice Jarre
- "Marche de Menilmontant" by Maurice Chevalier
- "Marchons sur Paris" by François Bonnal
- "Marronniers de Paris" by Claude Bolling
- "The Maxim Girl" by Ivan Caryll and C.M.S. McLellan
- "Maxim's" from The Merry Widow musical
- "Maxim's" by Serge Gainsbourg
- "Meet Me in Paris" by DJ Antoine
- "Meet You in Paris" by Jonas Brothers
- "Meeting in Paris" by McKendree Spring
- "Méfiez-vous de Paris" by Juliette Gréco
- "Memories of Paris" by Lew Douglas
- "Memories of Versailles Waltz" by Carrie Jacobs-Bond
- "Menilmontant" by Charles Trenet
- "Ménilmontant" by Gilbert Montagné
- "Menilmontant" by Young Flowers
- "Merci Paris" by Angèle Durand
- "Merci Paris" by Milva
- "The Merry Widow Waltz" from the operetta The Merry Widow
- "The Metro" by Berlin
- "Metro" by Bill Pritchard
- "Metro" by Telephone
- "Métro" by Toots Thielemans
- "Metro" by U.K. Subs
- "Métro" by Yves Montand
- "Metro Blanche" by Bob Sinclar
- "Métro Charogne" by Dimitri
- "Metro Jazz" by Bill Coleman
- "Metro Pigalle" by Edith Nylon
- "Métro - Pigalle: la Java - la Belote" by Jacques Ysaye
- "Métro truc métro chose" by Pierre Gueyrard
- "Metroland" by Mark Knopfler
- "Métropolitain" by Jean Yatove
- "Michelle mon Amour" by Felix Pascal
- "Midnight at Maxim's" by Eddie Higgins
- "Midnight in Montmartre" by Roy Grainer & His Music
- "Midnight in Paris" by David Carroll (musician)
- "Midnight in Paris" by Doug Fox & the Airdales
- "Midnight in Paris" by Frank Verna
- "Midnight in Paris" (from Here's to Romance)
- "Midnight in Paris" by Joe Longthorne
- "Midnight in Paris" by Stephen Stills
- "Midnight in Paris 1979" by Eddi Reader
- "Mimi from Paris" by Johnny Gomez and His Orchestra (calypso)
- "Minuit aux Champs-Élysées" by Herbie Hancock
- "Mirabeau sous le pont" by Juliette Gréco
- "Miss Paris" by Queen's Hall Light Orchestra
- "Mission à Paris" by Gruppo Sportivo
- "Misty Montmartre" by Franck Pourcel
- "Moi j'ai d'la chance à Paris - Twist" by Miguel Cordoba
- "Moi je dors près de la Seine" by Jacqueline François
- "Mon dié sénié" by Malcolm McLaren
- "Mon Paris" by Josephine Baker
- "Mon plus vieux copain" by Maurice Chevalier
- "Mon vieux Paris" by Caterina Valente
- "The Mona Lisa" by Brad Paisley
- "Monk in Paris" by Charles Lloyd (jazz musician)
- "Monsieur aus Paris" by Angèle Durand
- "Monsieur Dupont" by Sandie Shaw
- "Montagne Ste Geneviève" by Django Reinhardt
- "Montmartre" by BZN
- "Montmartre" by Cole Porter
- "Montmartre" by Django Reinhardt
- "Montmartre" by Irving Berlin
- "Montmartre" by Mario Piu
- "Montmartre" by Punchinello
- "Montmartre" by Will Glahe
- "Montmartre Blues" by Eddie Brunner
- "Montmartre Boogie Woogie" by Sidney Bechet
- "Montmartre Cafe" by Mike Absalom
- "The Montmartre Girl" from the revue Paramount on Parade
- "Montmartre March" by Doc Severinsen
- "Montmartre Moan" by Danny Polo
- "Montmartre Montmartre" by Mireille Mathieu
- "The Montmartre Rag" by Mitchell's Jazz Kings
- "Montmartre Rose" by Jan Garber
- "Montparnasse" by Eddie Calvert
- "Montparnasse" by Philippe Sarde
- "Montparnasse" by Sammy Price
- "Montparnasse" by Tess Teiges (this is Fancy (singer))
- "Montparnasse" from the musical With a Song in My Heart
- "Montparnasse Jump" by Danny Polo & His Swing Stars
- "Montréal/Paris" by Friends Circle
- "Moonlight in Versailles" by George Gershwin and Clifford Grey
- "Moonlight on the Seine" by the Baron (an alias of Alan Clare)
- "Moonlight over Paris" by Vanessa Williams
- "The Morning Music of Montmartre" by The Norman Luboff Choir from the musical comedy Oh, Captain!
- "Moscow Paris" by Felix Marc
- "Motion and Heart" by Orchestral Manoeuvres in the Dark
- "Moulin Rouge" by Dennie Christian
- "Moulin Rouge" by The Greg Kihn Band
- "Moulin Rouge" by Les Dudek
- "Moulin Rouge" by Severine
- "Moulin Rouge (Ein Lied aus Paris)" by Lys Assia
- "Mr Jones vit à Paris" by Blues Trottoir
- "Munivers de Paris" by Kraked Unit
- "Murders in the rue Morgue" by Eric Woolfson
- "Murders in the rue Morgue" by Iron Maiden
- "The Murders in the rue Morgue" by Mythos
- "Musée Rodin" by Pierre Gueyrard
- "Music in the Tuilleries" by Tom Newman (musician)
- "My Last Night in Montmartre" by Robb Johnson
- "Nächte am Montparnasse" by Henri Salvador
- "Nachten van Parijs" by Samantha
- "Nachts in Paris" by Lys Assia
- "Napoleon's Farewell to Paris" by Steve Turner
- "The Nations of Dear Paris" by Ludwig Englander and Harry B. Smith
- "Natt I Paris" by Peter Holm
- "Never Do a Tango with an Eskimo" by Alma Cogan
- "New Fangled, Jingle Jangle Swimming Suit from Paris" by Frankie Avalon
- "New York - Berlin - Paris" by Blue System
- "New York - London - Paris - Chicago" by Soup
- "(New York London Paris) Spleen" by Art of Noise
- "New York - Paris" by Space
- "Niggas in Paris" by Jay-Z & Kanye West
- "Night in Paris" by Finzy Kontini
- "Nights in Paris" by Illusion (UK band)
- "Night Train to Paris" by Jack Hardy
- "Nooit meer naar Parijs" by Anita Meyer
- "Notes from Paris" by Allan Taylor
- "Notre Dame" by Alec R. Costandinos
- "Notre Dame" by Cloven Hoof
- "Notre Dame" by Harmonia
- "Notre Dame (Cathedral)" by John Patitucci
- "Nous sommes employés de la ligne de l'Ouest" from La Vie parisienne
- "Nous vivrons à Paris" (from the comic opera Manon by Massenet)
- "Now She's in Paris" by Ray Price & Faron Young
- "Nuit de Saint-Germain" by Susan
- "Nuit sur les Champs-Élysées" by Miles Davis
- "N****as in Paris" by Kanye West and Jay Z
- "O Baião em Paris" by Os Brasileiros
- "October in Paris" by Jill Sobule
- "Ohé! Paris" by Charles Trenet
- "Old Paris" by Hot Lips Page
- "Olympia" by Christian Chevallier
- "Olympia Orgy" by Sacha Distel
- "On ne trouve ça qu'à Paris" by Aimable
- "On ne voit ça qu'à Paris" by Danielle Darrieux
- "On the Boulevard (Paris Promenade)" by Morton Gould
- "On the Champs Elysees (Sur les Champs Elysees)" by Vicki Benet
- "On the Corner of the rue Cambon" from Coco (musical)
- "On the Eiffel Tower" by Billy Durst
- "On the Outskirts of Paris" by Walter Schumann
- "On the Rue de la Paix in Paris" by Primo Scala (a recording alias of Harry Bidgood)
- "On the Seine" by Alyn Ainsworth And His Orchestra
- "On the Way to Paris" by Doris D And the Pins
- "On to Paris", music by Gustav Luders, lyrics by Joseph W. Herbert
- "On to Paris", music by Maury Rubens and Russell Tarbox, lyrics by Charles O. Locke and Frank Bannister
- "Once in Paris" by Lou Bennett Trio
- "One Day in Paris" by Martha & the Muffins
- "One Night in Paris" by 10cc
- "One Night in Paris" by Casseopaya
- "One Night in Paris" by Jimmy Pursey
- "One Night in Paris" by The Rattles
- "One Night in Paris" by Rino Senteri
- "One of Those Things (Girls of the Folies Bergere)" by Jackie Gleason
- "Only for Americans" by Irving Berlin
- "Ooh-La-La, Maurice!: Paris, Je t'aime d'amour - Valentine - En parlant un peu de Paris" by Jacques Ysaye
- "Opportunities (Let's Make Lots of Money)" by Pet Shop Boys
- "Opryland in Paris" by Andy Badale (alias of Angelo Badalamenti)
- "Orient Express Paris-Shangai" by Jennifer
- "Oui, je suis d'Paris" by Mistinguett
- "Oui-Oui (A Canadian in Paris)" by Pulsallama
- "Our Lady from Maxims" by Young Turks
- "Our Lady of Pigalle" by Madeleine Peyroux
- "Our Last Summer" by ABBA
- "Out Bois de Boulogne Way" by Orchestre Billy Max
- "Oxygene in the Ghetto" by Jean-Michel Jarre
- "Ozoir-la-Ferrière" by Roger Pierre et Jean-Marc Thibault
- "P.A.R.I.S." by BT
- "P.A.R.I.S." by Dani (singer)
- "På Champs-Elysees" by Steinar Fjeld
- "Paddy in Paris" by The Fureys and Davey Arthur
- "Pagan in Paris" by Jack Pleis
- "The Palace of Versailles" by Al Stewart
- "Palais Royal" by Alain Chamfort & Steve Nieve
- "Panam'" by Triptik
- "Papa Paris" by Vanessa Paradis
- "Par nos chansons et par nos cris, célébrons Paris" from La Vie parisienne (operetta)
- "Parc Monceau" by Hubert Rostaing
- "Paree" (from At Home Abroad)
- "Paree!" by the Night Club Orchestra
- "Paree" (from Right This Way)
- "Paree, Gay Paris" from Vera Violetta
- "Paree, Paris, Paris" by Victor Feldman All-Stars
- "Paree (Stranger in Paris)" (from New Moon (1940 film))
- "Paree, What Did You Do to Me?" from the musical comedy Fifty Million Frenchmen
- "Paree's a Branch of Broadway", music by Max Hoffmann, lyrics by George Bronson-Howard and Harold Atteridge
- "Parfum de Paris" by Otto Sieben
- "Parigi con le gambe aperte" by Ricky Gianco and Gino Paoli
- "Parigi Londra New York" by Filipponio
- "Parigi, O Cara, Noi Lasceremo (We Will Leave Paris, O Beloved)" from La traviata by Giuseppe Verdi
- "Pariisi–Helsinki" by Jari Sillanpää
- "Parijs Ligt aan de Seine" by De Spelbrekers
- "Parijse Tango" by Herman van Veen
- "Parijs" by Kenny B
- "Paris" by The 1975
- "Paris" by Alfie Khan Sound Orchestra
- "Paris" by Amund Enger
- "Paris" by Andre Bernheim
- "Paris" by Anna Domino
- "Paris" by Après La Classe
- "Paris" by BFG
- "Paris" by Beat Club
- "Paris" by Benton Paul
- "Paris" by Brenda Wootten
- "Paris" by Brigitte Bardot
- "Paris" by Camille
- "Paris" by the Cast
- "Paris" by Camille
- "Paris" by The Chainsmokers
- "Paris" by Chips
- "Paris" by Cucumber Jackson
- "Paris" by Daddy Yod
- "Paris" by Dagny
- "Paris" by David Guetta
- "Paris" by Dido
- "Paris" by DJ Snake feat. GASHI
- "Paris" by DJ Taucher
- "Paris" by Delerium and Aude
- "Paris" by E. Ray Goetz and Louis Alter from the 1928 musical Paris and the 1929 film Paris
- "Paris" by Édith Piaf
- "Paris" by Elton John
- "Paris" by Eric Van Der Westen's Quadrant featuring Norma Winstone
- "Paris" by Ernie Bill
- "Paris" by Faith Hill
- "Paris" by Fatal Charm
- "Paris" by Fickle Friends
- "Paris" by Figures on A Beach
- "Paris" by Flanders & Swann
- "Paris" by Fleur East
- "Paris" by Fred Jay & Joachim Heider
- "Paris" by Friendly Fires
- "Paris" by Gatlin
- "Paris" by Geoffrey Downes & the New Dance Orchestra
- "Paris" by Groove Armada
- "Paris" by the Heartbeats
- "Paris" by Holly Beth Vincent
- "Paris" by Jan Johnston
- "Paris" by Jane Powell
- "Paris" by Jet Vegas
- "Paris" by Johnny Keating & 27 Men
- "Paris" by Jonatha Brooke & the Story
- "Paris" by Joshua Kadison
- "Paris" by Karen Souza
- "Paris" by Kate Nash
- "Paris" by Kenya Grace
- "Paris" by Lana Del Rey
- "Paris" by Marc Lavoine
- "Paris" by Memphis Slim & Canned Heat
- "Paris" by Metro
- "Paris" by Michel Legrand
- "Paris" by M|O|O|N
- "Paris" by Moondog
- "Paris" by Nono la Grinta
- "Paris" by Northern Picture Library
- "París" by La Oreja de Van Gogh
- "Paris" by Os Tornados
- "Paris" by Our Daughter's Wedding
- "Paris" by Pandamonium
- "Paris" by Patrick Juvet
- "Paris" by Patrick Wolf
- "Paris" by Perez Prado
- "Paris" by Randy Edelman
- "Paris" by The Red Krayola
- "Paris" by Regina Spektor
- "Paris" by Regine
- "Paris" by Rohff
- "Paris" by Sabrina Carpenter
- "Paris" by S.C.U.M.
- "Paris" by Shawn Lane
- "Paris" by Shig & Buzz (featuring Peter Miller (musician)
- "Paris" by Shockabilly
- "Paris" by Southside Johnny & the Asbury Jukes
- "Paris" by Stephan Eicher
- "Paris" by T'N'I
- "Paris" by Taxi Girl
- "Paris" by Taylor Swift
- "Paris" by Thijs Van Leer
- "Paris" by Trust
- "Paris" by Tyka Nelson
- "Paris" by Wise Guys
- "Paris" by Yael Naim
- "Paris" by Tox Modell
- "Paris 1"/"Paris 2" by Matt Wand
- "Paris 1798430" by Tevin Campbell
- "Paris 1919" by John Cale
- "Paris 1944" by Harry Thumann
- "Paris (1945)" by California
- "Paris 1985" by Lecomte de Brégeot & Elle Valenci
- "Paris 2004" by Peter Bjorn and John
- "Paris 4X" by Laurent Hô
- "Paris 50" by Olli Letkiss & Hyydro
- "Paris, 5 H du Matin" by Philippe Sarde
- "Paris 9" by Ducks Deluxe
- "Paris a le blues" by Mad in Paris
- "Paris a le cœur tendre" by Georges Moustaki
- "Paris, a Night Piece - The Song of a Great City" by Frederick Delius
- "Paris à ses" by Maurice Chevalier
- "Paris Afro House Club" by Mo Laudi
- "Paris After Dark" by Ahmad Jamal
- "Paris Afternoon" by Ian Tamblyn
- "Paris and Amsterdam Nights" by Kenny Johnson
- "Paris and Rome" by Cranes
- "Paris and You" by Pierre's Friends
- "Paris Arm" by Team Sleep
- "Paris Arrival" by Victor Young from the 1956 film Around the World in 80 Days
- "Paris at Night" by Reverend and the Makers
- "Paris au mois d'août" by Charles Aznavour
- "Paris au mois de septembre" by Jean-Claude Pascal
- "Paris avance" by Mano Solo
- "Paris B.B." by Christiane Legrand
- "Paris Bar Association" by United Steels of Europe
- "Paris Basilic" by Jean Vallée
- "Paris Beguin" by Jane Marnac
- "Paris Bells" by Lee Hazlewood
- "Paris Bells" by Marianne Faithfull
- "Paris Blue" by Lykke Li
- "Paris Blues" by Bernheim
- "Paris Blues" by Daniél
- "Paris Blues" by Duke Ellington
- "Paris Blues" by Eddie Barclay & His Orchestra
- "Paris Blues" by Erroll Garner
- "Paris Blues" by Sonny Criss
- "Paris Blues" by Tony Middleton
- "Paris Boheme" by Eddie Barclay & His Orchestra
- "Paris Boulevard" by Mano Solo
- "Paris Boulevard" by Orquesta Mondragón
- "Paris Bounce" by Erroll Garner
- "Paris Bound" by Peter Foldy
- "Paris Bourges" by Jean-Michel Jarre
- "Paris Bravo" by Conny
- "Paris brûle-t-il?" by Indochine
- "Paris Bruxelles" by David McNeil
- "Theme du Film 'Paris brûle-t-il?' (Is Paris Burning?)" by Herbie Mann
- "Paris Burning" from the Disney film The Hunchback of Notre Dame
- "Paris by Air" by Tygers of Pan Tang
- "Paris by Candlelight" by Steve Race and his Orchestra
- "Paris by Night" by Amanda Lear
- "Paris by Night" by Linda Keel
- "Paris by Night" by Patrick Juvet
- "Paris by Night" (from the musical 'Victor/Victoria')
- "Paris by Night (Is Outts Sight)" by David Christie
- "Paris By Night (Je Cherche Apres Titine)" by Bob Sinclar
- "Paris by Night (Rififi)" by Ted Heath
- "Paris by Night (Sous le citel de Paris)" by Carl Lewis
- "Paris-Cabourg" (from the film of the same name)
- "Paris Can Be Magic" by Jacqueline Boyer
- "Paris canaille" by Michael Legrand & His Orchestra
- "Paris Can't Wait" by The Elvis Brothers
- "Paris Carnival" (from A Parisian Model)
- "Paris c'est fini" by Atoll
- "Paris c'est une idée" by Leo Ferre
- "Paris Chase Dance" by Pax Trio
- "Paris cherie" by Josephine Baker
- "Paris City Boy" by Pet Shop Boys
- "Paris clandestin" by Claude Goaty
- "Paris-Dakar" by The Dactaris
- "Paris d'autrefois" by Andre Verchuren
- "Paris de mes melancolies" by Jacqueline Francois
- "Paris de Mimi Pinson" by Sacha Distel
- "Paris, de Seine en place Pigalle" by Helen en Fred
- "Paris d'en haut" by Luis Mariano
- "Paris des autres" by Liliane Davis
- "Paris Dies in the Morning" by Leo Sayer
- "Paris Disco" by Alain Barriere
- "Paris dix heures du soir" sung by Carolie Clément composed by Benjamin Biolay
- "Paris, du bist die schönste Stadt der Welt" by Eugen Wolff
- "Paris - Einfach so nur zum Spaß" by Udo Jürgens
- "Paris en colère" from the film Paris Brûle-t-il?
- "Paris en rose" by Olivier Constantin
- "Paris est en guerre" by Skinkorps
- "Paris Eyes" by Larry Young
- "Paris Fanfare" by Paul Patterson (composer)
- "Paris Fashion" by Ike Isaacs
- "Paris Fashions" by Paris
- "Paris Fashions" by Screen Idols
- "Paris Four Hundred" by Mylo
- "Paris-Forty One" by Three Johns
- "Paris, France" by Buck
- "Paris (France)" by Les Rita Mitsouko
- "Paris, France" by Lords of Acid
- "Paris, France" from the musical Make a Wish
- "Paris, France" by Nico Catrina
- "Paris, France" by Paris France Transit
- "Paris, France" by Red Guitars
- "Paris, France" by Space
- "Paris, France" by Wasted Youth
- "Paris Ghetto Zoo" by S'Kaya
- "Paris Girls" by Robinson Cruiser
- "Paris Gown" (from the musical Hazel Flagg)
- "Paris Grandit" by Pierre Gueyrard
- "Paris Heights" by Lykes of Yew
- "Paris Holds the Key to Your Heart from the film Anastasia
- "Paris Holiday" by Henry Mancini
- "Paris Holiday" from the film Paris Holiday
- "Paris (Ici avec moi)" by Hiroshima
- "Paris in a Day" by Ellis Paul
- "Paris in Between the Wars" by Trespassers W
- "Paris in Blue" by Charles Mingus
- "Paris in Flames" by Thursday
- "Paris in Flares" by The Housemartins
- "Paris in June" by Johnnyswim
- "Paris in June" by Wreckless Eric
- "Paris in May" by Alex Bugnon
- "Paris in Minneapolis" by Chris Rea
- "Paris in Spring" by Tara Kemp
- "Paris in the Bottle" by Claude Bolling
- "Paris in the Morning" by Joe Purdy
- "Paris in the Rain" by Alcazar
- "Paris in the Rain" by Eddie Calvert
- "Paris in the Rain" by Hello People
- "Paris in the Rain" by Henry Wright
- "Paris in the Rain" by The Waterboys
- "Paris in the Spring" by Ray Noble
- "Paris in the Winter" by Jonathan Kris
- "Paris in Your Eyes" by Milton di São Paulo (this is an alias of Alec R Costandinos)
- "Paris Interlude" by Camarata
- "Paris (Interlude)" by Marcus Miller
- "Paris Interlude (Mignonette • Femme du Monde • Gamin)" by Les Baxter
- "Paris Is a Lonely Town" by Judy Garland
- "Paris Is a Paradise For..", music by Alberta Nichols; John Frederick Coots and Maurie Rubens, lyrics by Clifford Grey and Mann Holiner
- "Paris Is a Spot So Fair" by Richard Heuberger, Clare Kummer and Sydney Rosenfeld
- "Paris Is at Her Best in May" by Bobby Scott (musician)
- "Paris Is Burning" by Derajah & the Donkey Jaw Bone
- "Paris Is Burning" by Dokken
- "Paris Is Burning" by Ladyhawke
- "Paris Is Burning" by Mother's Ruin
- "Paris Is Burning" by Pallas
- "Paris Is Burning" by St. Vincent
- "Paris Is One Day Away" by The Mood
- "Paris Is Paris Again" from the musical Gigi
- "Paris Is Wonderful" by Joachim Kuhn
- "Paris Isn't Paris" by Robert Mellin
- "Paris ist eine Reise wert" by Peter Alexander (Austrian performer)
- "Paris ist nicht mehr, was es war" by Mireille Mathieu
- "Paris Jardin" by Nicole Louvier
- "Paris, je ne t'aime plus" by Leo Ferré
- "Paris, je reviens vers toi" by Maya Casabianca
- "Paris je t'aime" by Michael Legrand & His Orchestra
- "Paris je t'aime d'amour" by Manu Dibango
- "Paris je t'aime d'amour" by Maurice Chevalier
- "Paris Joy Ride" by Ferrante & Teicher
- "Paris l'accroche cœur" by Simone Alma
- "Paris, l'aprés-midi" by Zaz (singer)
- "Paris la nuit" by Helmut Zacharias
- "Paris la tendresse" by Jacques Hustin
- "Paris Lament" by Sammy Price
- "Paris Latino" by Bandolero
- "Paris le flore" by Etienne Daho
- "Paris Lights" by Nick Ayoub & His Orchestra
- "Paris Longing" by Peter Gallway
- "Paris Loves Lovers" by Fred Astaire
- "Paris Lullabye" by Mantovani
- "Paris Lutece Paname" by Malcolm McLaren
- "Paris ma rose" by Serge Reggiani
- "Paris m'a dit je t'aime" by Jean-Jacques
- "Paris Makes Me Horny" (from the musical 'Victor/Victoria')
- "Main Title Theme/Love Theme from 'The Paris Man'" by Tot Taylor & His Orchestra
- "Paris Maquis" by Metal Urbain
- "Paris Mambo" by Eddie Thompson (musician)
- "Paris Match" by Skitch Henderson
- "The Paris Match" by Style Council
- "Paris Melodie" by Johnny Kern
- "Paris Mélancolie" by Vladimir Cosma
- "Paris mes amours" by Josephine Baker
- "Paris métro" by Eddie Johns
- "Paris métro" by George Melachrino
- "Paris, Mexico" by Gangway (band)
- "Paris - Mexique" by Michel Polnareff
- "Paris Midnight" by Erroll Garner
- "Paris minois" by Aimable
- "Paris Mist" by Ted Heath & His Music
- "Paris Mixed Up" by the Staff
- "Paris Mode" by Royal Philharmonic Orchestra
- "Paris (Mon arbre)" by Rod McKuen
- "Paris Montage" by Michel Legrand
- "Paris Monte-Carlo" by Bernard Peiffer et André Persiany
- "Paris Mood Tonight" by Tony Joe White
- "Paris Mood (Un de Fromage)" by Tom Waits
- "Paris Morning" by Prelude
- "Paris-Moscou (Париж-Москва)" by Alexandre Nekrassov
- "Paris-Musette" by Jo Privat
- "Paris My Oldest Pal" by Lilo
- "Paris Night" by Kawabata
- "Paris Night Life" by Pierre Legendre and the Paris International Orchestra
- "Paris Nights" by Addy Flor & His Orchestra
- "Paris Nights" by Richard Mendelson
- "Paris Nights/New York Mornings" by Corinne Bailey Rae
- "Paris Nocturne" by Dan Fogelberg
- "Paris, Oh Festive Land" music by Franz Lehar; lyrics by Harold Atteridge and Paul M. Potter
- "Paris on My Mind" by Ryan Paris
- "Paris (Ooh la la)" by Grace Potter and the Nocturnals
- "Paris? Oui!" by Dewey Redman
- "Paris Original" from How to Succeed in Business Without Really Trying
- "Paris/Orly" by Deux
- "Paris Oui Oui" by David Rose
- "Paris Palace Hotel" by Roger Roger et Son Orchestre
- "Paris Paradise" by Pierre Duval and His Orchestra
- "Paris, Paree" by Robey
- "Paris Paris" from the musical Lorelei
- "Paris Paris" by Malcolm McLaren/Catherine Deneuve
- "Paris, Paris" by Benjamin Biolay
- "Paris, Paris" by Chantal Goya
- "Paris, Paris" by Dani (singer)
- "Paris, Paris" by TTC
- "Paris, Paris, Paris" by Brigitte Bardot and Jeanne Moreau
- "Paris, Paris, Paris" by Josephine Baker
- "Paris, Paris, Paris (Madrid)" by Rico's Creole Band
- "Paris Parisse" by Philippe Clay
- "Paris Pas Rio" by Evinha (member of Trio Esperança)
- "The Paris Peppermint Twist" by Continental Cousins
- "Paris Perdu" by Mireille Mathieu
- "Paris Poète (Paris Poeta)" by Franck Pourcel
- "Paris-Problèmes" by Mireille Mathieu
- "Paris Promenade" by George Melachrino
- "Paris-Quebec" by Ginette Reno
- "Paris Reminds Me of You" by Ivor Novello
- "Paris Rendezvous" by Siobhan
- "Paris Retro" by Claude Bolling
- "Paris Rockin'" by Winston McAnuff
- "Paris Romance" by Gilb'r Vs. U-Roy
- "Paris Rose" (from the Japanese revue 'Mon Paris')
- "Paris St Germain" by The Pogues
- "Paris se marie" by Dani (singer)
- "Paris se regarde" by Francis Lemarque
- "Paris se rêve..." by Juliette Gréco
- "Paris s'endort" by Lescop
- "Paris s'ennuie" by Alain Verrier
- "Paris s'éveille la nuit" by Amália Rodrigues
- "Paris s'éveille (Il est cinq heures Paris s'éveille)" by MUSart
- "Paris sens interdit" by Arthur Baker & the Backbeat Disciples
- "Paris Sentimental" by Franck Pourcel
- "Paris sera toujours Paris" by Maurice Chevalier
- "Paris Skies" by Kate St John
- "Paris Skies" by Fanny Mae & the Dynamite Believers
- "Paris Skyes" by Big Electric Cat
- "Paris Smiles" by Mel Torme
- "The Paris Song" by Jake Holmes
- "Paris Song" by Lee Hazlewood
- "The Paris Song" by Trevor Chance
- "Paris: the Song of a Great City" by Frederick Delius
- "Paris Soul Food" by Hal Singer
- "Paris sous les bombes" by Supreme NTM
- "Paris sous la pluie" by Samson Schmitt Quintet
- "Paris-Sport" by Monsieur Jules et son ensemble
- "Paris Stairs" by Duke Ellington
- "Paris, Stay the Same" from the musical comedy The Love Parade
- "Paris - Strasbourg" by Laurent Voulzy
- "Paris - Suite" by Haydn Wood
- "Paris Summer" by Nancy Sinatra & Lee Hazlewood
- "Theme to a Paris Sunday" by Pierre Belmonde
- "Paris Sunrise #7" by Ben Harper
- "Paris Sunshine" by Mardi Gras (music group)
- "Paris Sur Mer" by Morcheeba
- "Paris Swing" by Dizzy Gillespie
- "Paris Sylvie" by Sylvie Vartan
- "Paris Symphonies" by Joseph Haydn
- "Paris 2 NY (Hub Bub Bubbledybub)" by Love Pirates
- "Paris Tango" by Billy Britt Recording Orchestra
- "Paris Taught Me Zis" by Abel Baer, Joe Young (lyricist) and Sam M. Lewis
- "Paris-Taxi" by B-Side
- "Paris Taxi" by Vivian Ellis
- "Paris Terre Mouillée" by Gribouille
- "Paris Through the Window" from the musical 'A Class Act'
- "Paris Time" by Gian Piero Reverberi & Robert Mellin
- "Paris to Peru" by Grand Theft
- "Paris - Tour Eiffel" by Maurice Chevalier
- "Paris Train" by Beth Orton
- "Paris tu m'as pris dans tes bras" by Enrico Macias
- "Paris tu n'as pas change" by Jean Sablon
- "Paris un-huit" by Malcolm McLaren
- "Paris vieux" by Queen Ida & the Bon Temps Zydeco Band
- "Paris-violon" by Jacqueline François
- "Paris Vision" by Space Art
- "Paris voici Paris" by Tino Rossi
- "Paris vor hundert Jahren" by Mireille Mathieu
- "Paris Wakes Up and Smiles" by Al Jolson
- "The Paris Waltz" (from the operetta 'Candide')
- "Paris Waltz" by Kenny Baker (fiddler)
- "Paris Waltz" by Maurice Jarre
- "Paris Was Made for Lovers" by Michel Legrand
- "Paris-Wellington" by Valérie Lagrange
- "Paris with You" by Rolf Harris
- "Paris Without You (St. Vincent's Court)" by Kim Carnes
- "Paris, Woody and Me" by Paris Reunion Band
- "Paris, You're in Paris" by Jimmy Campbell
- "Parisafrica" by Heaven West Eleven
- "Pariser Einzugsmarsch" by Johann Heinrich Walch
- "Parisette" by Django Reinhardt
- "Parisian" by The Stereotypes
- "Parisian Cafe Blue" by Scrounger
- "Parisian Dream" by Laura Veirs
- "Parisian Fantasy - Under the Lights of Paris" by Jerry Murad's Harmonicats & Stagg McMann
- "Parisian Girl" by the Crickets
- "Parisian Girl" by Sniff 'N' the Tears
- "Parisian Girl" by Steve Teale
- "Parisian Heiress" by Ruth Welcome
- "Parisian Lover", music by Jesse Greer and Sam H. Stept, lyrics by Bud Green and Stanley Adams
- "Parisian Nights" by Akira Jimbo
- "Parisian Nights" by David McMurray
- "Parisian Nights", music by Louis Hirsch, lyrics by Irving Caesar and John Murray Anderson)
- "Parisian Pierrot" by Julie Andrews
- "Parisian Rag" by Annie Cordy
- "Parisian Rain" by Mojo Juju
- "Parisian Rock" by the Sabres
- "Parisian Thoroughfare" by Max Roach and Clifford Brown
- "The Parisian Trot" (from the film Doll Face)
- "Parisian Two-Step" from The Pink Lady (musical)
- "Parisian Waltz" by John Pelletier and his Orchestra
- "Parisian Women" by Cy Coleman
- "The Parisians" from the musical Gigi
- "Parisien" by Dummy Run
- "Parisien" by Frank Weir
- "Parisien Plight I"/"Parisien Plight II" by Shawn Phillips
- "Parisienne" by Florence Véran
- "Parisienne" by Howard Keel
- "Parisienne Eyeful" by Ralph Sharon
- "Parisienne Girl" by Incognito
- "Parisienne Girl" by Ryan Paris
- "Parisienne High Heels" by Chapman-Whitney
- "Parisienne Hotel" by Johnny Diesel & the Injectors
- "Parisienne Lady" by Kes
- "Parisienne Mechanical Models" from the Broadway musical Linger Longer Letty
- "Parisienne Moonlight" by Anathema
- "Parisienne Pom Pom" by Jerry Carretta
- "Parisienne Walkways" by Gary Moore
- "Parisienne Waltz" by Mellodiers
- "Pariške kapije" by Haris Džinović
- "Parisound" by Leroy Gomez
- "Parking in Paris" by Polly Bolton & Paul Dunmall
- "Paryż i my" by Krzysztof Krawczyk
- "Park in Paris" by Maurice Chevalier
- "Parlez-moi de Paris" by André Dassary
- "Party in Paris" by UK Subs
- "Passantes de Passy" by David McNeil
- "Passeport to Paris" by Sidney Bechet
- "Passion for Paris" by Frankie Valli
- "Pavements of Paris (Sur le pave)" by George Melachrino
- "Pearl's Girl" by Underworld (band)
- "Perdu dans Paris" by The Tangent
- "Père Lachaise" by Malcolm McLaren
- "Personality" by Johnny Mercer and The Pied Pipers
- "Pescara to Genova to Paris" by Jaki Byard Trio
- "Phantasmagoria (On Themes from The Ghosts of Versailles)" by John Corigliano
- "Philip à Paris" by Philip Catherine
- "Pictures of Paris" by The Pencils
- "Pictures of Paris" by Wax (UK band)
- "Pigalle" by Georges Ulmer
- "Pigalle" by Mario Piu
- "Pigalle" by Splinter
- "Pigalle Blues" by Gordon Smith
- "Pigalle Cloudburst" by Franck Pourcel
- "Pigalle, das ist die grosse Mausefalle" by Peter Alexander
- "Pigalle ja Montmartti" by Reino Helismaa
- "Pigalle on a Tuesday Is Charming" by Bill Pritchard
- "Pigalle...Pigalle" by Marcel Amont
- "Pigtails in Paris" by David MacBeth
- "Pioneering/Let's Take a Trip to Paris" by Telephone Bill and the Smooth Operators
- "Place Blanche" by André Ekyan
- "Place de la Concorde" by Paris Lacroix
- "Place de la Madeleine" by Valli
- "Place de la Republique" by Cœur de Pirate
- "Place de Victoires" by The Stranglers
- "Place des Abbesses" by International Peoples Gang
- "Place des Grands Hommes" by Patrick Bruel
- "Place des Vosges" by Pierre Gueyrard
- "Place du Tertre" by Robert Charles Lanson
- "Place Pigalle" by Dick Jacobs and the Orchestra
- "Place Pigalle" by Elliott Smith
- "Place Pigalle" by Maurice Chevalier
- "Place St Georges" by Shazz
- "Place Vendome" by Place Vendome
- "Plaster of Paris" by Hieronymus Bosch
- "Plastered in Paris" by Lew Stone
- "Play the Paris Blues" by Merl Saunders
- "Please Come to Paris" by Randy Bachman
- "Polka du Roi" by Charles Trenet
- "Polka Pigalle" by de Lachende Accordeonisten
- "Polka Parisienne" by Paul Meyer (Adriano)
- "Pont Royal" by Juliette Gréco
- "Ponte Entre Rio E Paris" by Evinha (member of Trio Esperança)
- "Ponts de Paris" by Mireille Mathieu
- "Pont Des Arts" by St Germain (musician)
- "Poor People of Paris" by Winifred Atwell
- "Popsicles in Paris" from the musical revue To Broadway with Love
- "Portes des Lilas" by Georges Brassens
- "Portes des Lilas" by John Surman
- "The Portrait Painter of Paris" by Winifred Atwell
- "Postcard from Paris" by The Band Perry
- "Postcard from Paris" by John Denver
- "Postcard from Paris" by Wayne Rooks
- "Poursuite et Metro" by Barney Wilen
- "Prague et Paris" by Jacqueline François
- "Pré Catelan" by Tony Murena
- "Pretty Baby Doll from Paris" by Augustus Barratt
- "The Pretty Girls of Paris" by Cornell Strings
- "Prologue: The Stage of the Paris Opéra, 1905" by Andrew Lloyd Webber
- "Promenade aux Champ Elysees" by Sidney Bechet
- "Promenade dans Paris" by Paul Bonneau
- "Puppet in Paris" by Bob Davie & His Orchestra
- "Purple Paris Time" by Nan Tuck Five
- "Quai de Bercy" by Maurice Chevalier
- "Quand Paris s'éteint" by Jean-Louis Aubert
- "Quartier Latin" by Gibson Brothers
- "Quartier Latin" by Leo Ferre
- "Quartier Latin" by Mezzoforte
- "Quartier Latin" by Ted Curson
- "The Queen of Belle Paris" by Seymour Furth, Edward B. Claypoole and Will A. Heelan
- "The Queen of Paris" from the musical revue The Streets of Paris
- "Qu'est-ce que tu viens faire à Paris?" by Gino Palatino
- "Quel temps fait-il à Paris" by Gus Viseur
- "Quelque part à Paris" by Regine
- "Quiet Days in Clichy (Jours tranquilles à Clichy)" by Country Joe McDonald
- "Radio-Paris" by Attentat Sonore
- "Rain on the Seine" by Bill Le Sage
- "Rainbow over l'Opera" by Franck Pourcel
- "Rainclouds over Paris of My Dreams" by Bill Nelson
- "Raining in Paris" by Lil' Ed Williams & the Blues Imperials
- "Rainy Night in Paris" by Chris de Burgh
- "Rainy Night in Paris" by Franck Pourcel
- "Rainy Night in Paris (Memphis Reject)" by Don Nix
- "Reaction Overload/Paris-London, Junky Express" by Yossarian
- "Reasons to Be Cheerful Part 3" by Ian Dury
- "Red Balloon" by Dave Clark Five
- "Reflection of Paris" by Kazumi Watanabe
- "Rendez-vous à Paris" by Jean-Michel Jarre
- "Rendez-vous au casino de Paris" by Caterina Valente
- "Rendez-vous avec Paris" by Guy Revaldy
- "Rendez-vous de Paname" by Yves Montand
- "Rendez-vous in Paris" by Aeden
- "Rendezvous Time in Paree" from the musical revue The Streets of Paris. Covered by the Glenn Miller Orchestra (vocal by Ray Eberle) and the Ray Charles Singers
- "The Resistance" by Maurice Jarre from the film Is Paris Burning?
- "Retour à Paris" by Charles Trenet
- "Reunion in Paris" by Eartha Kitt, Doc Cheatham & Bill Coleman
- "Reve Parisien" by Quincy Jones & José Feliciano
- "Revoir Paris" by Charles Trenet
- "Riffin' in Paris" by Jam-Session N° 5
- "The Right Girl on the Left Bank" by Joe Reisman
- "The Right Stuff" by Vanessa Williams
- "The Ritz Roll and Rock" by Cole Porter
- "Rive Gauche" by Acoustic Alchemy
- "Rive Gauche" by Alain Souchon
- "Rive Gauche" by Chorale
- "The River Seine (You Will Find Your Love in Paris)" by Dean Martin/Patti Page
- "The River Seine" by The Three Suns
- "River Seine: Chaland qui passe" by Jacques Ysaye
- "The Road to Paris" by Kasper Winding & Murray Head
- "Rocking at the Olympia"/"Flying at the Olympia" by Lionel Hampton
- "Rocquencourt" by Philippe Sarde
- "Romance de Paris" by Paul Mauriat
- "Romance sur la Seine" by Jim Brickman
- "Rondoparisiano" by Bob Sinclar
- "Rose blanche (Rue Saint-Vincent)" by Yves Montand
- "Route nationale 7" by Charles Trenet
- "Roads of Paris" by Jeremie
- "Rue Chaptal" (a.k.a. "Royal Roost") by Kenny Clarke
- "Rue Dauphine" by Malcolm McLaren
- "Rue de Charenton" by Orchestre National de Jazz
- "Rue du Chemin Vert" by Jazz-Hip Trio
- "Rue de Cherbourg" by the Softies
- "Rue de la Chine" by Marcel Azzola
- "Rue de la Gaîté" by Jacques Dutronc
- "Rue de la Harpe" by Jackie McLean & Dexter Gordon
- "Rue de la Paix" by Armand (singer)
- "Rue de la Paix" by Charles Albertine
- "Rue de la Paix" by Daniel Grau
- "Rue de la Paix" by Laurie Johnson
- "Rue de la Paix" by Léo Chauliac
- "Rue de la Paix" by Pierre Duval & His Orchestra
- "Rue de la Paix" by Roger Roger
- "Rue de la Paix" by Zazie
- "Rue de la Reynie" by Himalaya
- "Rue de Lappe" by Michèle Arnaud
- "Rue de Paris" by Aqua Bassino
- "Rue de Rivoli" by Adriano
- "Rue de Seine" by Dave Douglas & Martial Solal
- "Rue des Champs Elysées" by Sidney Bechet
- "Rue des Blancs Manteaux" by Juliette Gréco
- "Rue de la Paix" (music by Walter Donaldson; lyrics by Ballard MacDonald)
- "Rue des Lombards" by Orchestre National de Jazz
- "Rue des Rosier" by Regine
- "Rue du Four Rag" by King Harvest
- "Rue Duperré by Alix Combelle
- "Rue Edouard Robert" by Pierre Gueyrard
- "Rue Grégoire du Tour" by Larry Coryell
- "Rue Lambert" by Tab Two
- "Rue Lepic" by Yves Montand
- "Rue Marie-Laurence" by Joe Dassin
- "Rue Morgue" by The Boys
- "Rue Plumet" (from the musical 'Les Misérables')
- "Rue St Denis" by Carmel
- "Rue Saint-Vincent" by Yves Montand
- "Rue Serpente" by Pepper Adams
- "Rue Simon Bolivar" by David McNeil
- "Run Run Run to the Centre Pompidou" by Grant Hart
- "Rhythm Is love" by Keziah Jones
- "Sabrina's Return to Paris" by John Williams
- "Sacré Coeur" by Thijs Van Leer
- "S'aimer à Paris" by Liliane Riboni
- "Saint Germain" by Thijs Van Leer
- "Saint Germain Dance" by Claude Luter Quartet
- "Saint-Germain des Prés" by Aimé Barelli
- "Saint-Germain des Prés Blues" by Harold Baker and His Duke's Men
- "Samba de Orly" by Chico Buarque
- "Sans toi Paris n'est plus Paris" by Liesbeth List
- "Saumur (Paris Is Still Burning)" by Trust
- "San Bernadino" by Christie (band)
- "The Script/Folies Bergeres" (from the musical Nine)
- "Sebastian" by Cockney Rebel
- "The Secret Arsenal (Our Agent in Paris)" by the Capes & Masks
- "Secret Garden" by Madonna
- "Secrets of the Seine" by Tony Osborne
- "The Seine" by Guy Lombardo & His Royal Canadians
- "The Seine" by Kingston Trio
- "Seine City" by Little River Band
- "September in Paris" by Nikos Ignatiadis & Francis Goya
- "Serenade à une Parisienne" by Henri Crolla
- "Serenade pour Paris" by Raphael Martos
- "Serrini in Paris" by Serrini
- "Sèvres babylone" by Robert Mavounzy
- "Sexomatic" by The Bar-Kays
- "Sextown USA" by Sparks
- "Sexy Eiffel Towers" by Bow Wow Wow
- "The Shadows of Paris" by Henry Mancini
- "Shadows on the Seine" by Adriano
- "She's a Great Great Girl" by Harry Hastings's Palm Beach Orchestra
- "Shopping in Paris" by André Popp and His Orchestra
- "Si Paris était en Provence" by Mireille Mathieu
- "Si Paris pouvait" by Pia Colombo
- "Si tu connaissairs Paris" by Betty Mars
- "Sidewalks of Paris" by Iris Villiers
- "Sieger in Paris ist immer die Liebe" by Piera Martell
- "Sing a Song of Paris" by Ray Charles Singers
- "The Six Teens" by Sweet
- "Ska-la-Parasiene" by Roland Alphonso
- "Sleeping in Paris" by Rosanne Cash
- "Snack-bar gare Saint Lazare" by Lona Rita
- "Snowed in at Wheeler Street" by Kate Bush
- "So Far Away from Courbevoire" by Gilbert Bécaud
- "So ist Paris" by Peter Alexander
- "So N.Y." by Fabolous
- "So This Is Paris" by Gloria DeHaven from the musical So This Is Paris
- "So This Is Paris!" from the musical review The Passing Show of 1916
- "Soir de Paris (Valse Musette)" by Jimmy Cassidy
- "Some of Us May Never See Paris" by Sons of Abraham
- "Something to Remember" by I Like You Hysteric
- "Somewhere in Paris" by in Parallel
- "Somewhere over Paris" by Michael Stanley
- "Sommer in Paris" by Frans Bauer
- "The Song from Moulin Rouge (Where Is Your Heart?)" by Percy Faith and his Orchestra
- "The Song of Old Paris" by the Sheiks
- "The Sound of Paris" by Franck Pourcel
- "The Sound of Paris" by the Klaxons
- "Sous le ciel de Paris (Under Paris Skies)" by Edith Piaf
- "Sous les lofts de Paris" by Orchestre National de Jazz
- "Sous les ponts de Paris (Under the Bridges of Paris)" by Paul Mauriat
- "Sous les toits de Paris (Under the Roofs of Paris)" by Maurice Chevalier
- "South from Paris" by Marden Hill
- "Souvenir d'un Paris" by Anne Pigalle
- "Spring in Montmartre" by Mantovani
- "Square Severine" by Gilbert Bécaud, Germaine Ricord from film Casino de Paris
- "St Germain" by les Cinq Modernes
- "St Germain" by Vanessa Paradis
- "Star of Paris" by Phylicia Allen
- "Step to Paris Blues" (music by Maurice Rubens; lyrics by Clifford Grey)
- "Storm the Bastille" by The Angels
- "Story of the Paris Night" (music by Dave Stamper; lyrics by Gene Buck)
- "Stranger in Paris" (from the musical Gold Diggers in Paris)
- "Stranger in Paris" by Sailor
- "Street in Paris" by Whistler, Chaucer, Detroit, and Greenhill
- "Streets of Paris" by Don Costa
- "The Streets of Paris ..." from the musical revue The Streets of Paris
- "Stridin' Down Champs-Elysées" by Billy Taylor
- "Stuck in Paris (Nowhere to Go)" by After the Fire
- "The Student of Paris" by Angèle Durand
- "Suby en Paris" by Perez Prado
- "Sucu Sucu" by Nina & Frederik
- "Suenos de Paris" by Agostinho dos Santos
- "Summer in Paris" by DJ Cam
- "Summer in Paris" by Morris Albert
- "Summerdays in Paris" by David Ray
- "Sunday in Paris" by Ray Martin Orchestra
- "Sunday Morning St Denis" by Barb Jungr
- "Superman '42/Rue Morgue" by Alan Clayson
- "Sur le canal Saint-Martin" by Claude Goaty
- "Sur le pave de Paris (Pavements of Paris)" by Jean Sablon
- "Sur les quais du vieux Paris" by Lucienne Delyle
- "Swing de Paris" by Django Reinhardt
- "Swing from Paris" by Django Reinhardt
- "Swingin' at the 'Chez Florence'" by Willie Lewis
- "Swingin' at the Lutétia" by the Be-Bop Minstrels
- "Swingin' in Paris" by Fletcher Allen
- "Swingin' Parisan Rhythm (Jazz sur Seine)" by Barney Wilen
- "Symphonie de Paris" by Serge Lancen
- "Symphony Number 31 (Paris Symphony)" by Wolfgang Amadeus Mozart
- "Ta gueule Paris" by Philippe Clay
- "Ta' med til Paris" by Kanstad-kvartetten
- "Take It Easy" by Prince Buster
- "Take Me to Paris" by the Braniacs
- "Take Me to Paris" by Port Friendly
- "Take Me to Paris" by Sharon O'Neill
- "Take My Hand, Paris" by Judy Garland
- "Take You to Paris" by King David (reggae)
- "Tango in Paris" by Regina Belle
- "The Tale of Two Cities" by Semprini
- "Tanztee in Paris - Tango-Potpourri" by Alfred Hause
- "Taxi de Paris" by Chalawa
- "Taxi Nach Paris" by Felix de Luxe
- "Taxi Parisien" by Viktor Lazlo
- "Telefon aus Paris" by Bill Ramsey
- "Ten Million People in Paris" by Little Bob Story
- "That Naughty Show from Gay Paris" from The Girl in Pink Tights
- "That's Nice" by Neil Christian
- "That's Paris" by Adriano
- "That's the Song of Paree" from the musical comedy Love Me Tonight
- "That's What Makes Paris Paris" by Doris Day
- "Theatre Marigny Dressing Room" from the musical revue The Streets of Paris
- "Theft at the Musée de l'Homme" from the original soundtrack of That Man from Rio
- "There Is Only One Paris for That" from the musical Irma la Douce
- "There Never Was a Town Like Paris", music by Alberta Nichols, lyrics by Mann Holiner
- "There's a Lot of Pretty Little Things in Paris" by E. Ray Goetz
- "There's a Place Called Paris" by Mae Barnes
- "They Do the Same in Paris" by Lilo
- "The Thieves of Paris" by Dana
- "This Ain't Paris" by Tony Clay
- "This Little Town Is Paris" by Beverly Kenney
- "Three Cities Suite - Paris" by Dana Suesse
- "Three Girls in Paris" by Bent Fabric
- "Three Hours in Paris" by Keiser Twins
- "Throwing Metal at the Sky" by The Tangent
- "Thuileries" by Mario Piu
- "Thursday Evening St Denis" by Robb Johnson
- "Tiens c'est Paris" by Frida Boccara
- "Tina the belle of Parie" (children's song)
- "The Titanic: A Breton in Paris" by Moving Hearts
- "To Paris" by Nick Bicat
- "To Paris" by Victor Herbert
- "To Paris (Handle With Care)" by Click
- "To Paris with Love" by Donna Summer
- "To Take You Home" by Frank Turner
- "Tonight (Sprint to Paris)" by Paco Saval
- "Tonight You Are in Paris" from the musical Make A Wish
- "Tour de France" by Kraftwerk
- "Tour Eiffel" by Adriano
- "Tour Eiffel" by Jacqueline Boyer
- "Tour Eiffel" by Les Avions
- "Tout autour des tours de Nôtre-Dame" by Simone Langlois
- "Tout ça parc' qu'au bois de Chaville" by Pierre Destailles
- "Toulouse" by Poésie Noire
- "Traffic in Paris" by Camilleri
- "Train de Paris" by Sapho
- "Trains and Boats and Planes" by Dionne Warwick
- "Trans-Europe Express" by Kraftwerk
- "Träume Von Paris" by Dagmar Koller
- "Triel sur Seine, très tôt, le matin" by Véronique Sanson
- "Trifle Tower" by The Tremeloes
- "Trip to Paris" by The Red Krayola
- "Trocadero" (from the film Stop Calling Me Baby!)
- "Trocadero Suite/Trocadero Bleu Citron" by Alec R Costandinos
- "Trottoirs de Paris" by Sydney Bechet
- "Trouble in Paris" by Eric Andersen
- "Trumpets from Montparnasse" by The Lilac Time
- "Tu verras, Montmartre" by Michel Magne
- "Tuileries" by Jacqueline Brunard
- "Tuileries (Dispute d'enfants après jeux)" by Modest Mussorgsky
- "Tuileries de mes peines" by Marcel Mouloudji
- "Twilight in Paris" by Bernie Wayne
- "Twilight in the Tuileries" from the musical revue 'Slings And Arrows'
- "Twist à Paris" by Ici Paris
- "Twist de Paris" by Les Pirates
- "Twist Twist" by The Chakachas
- "Two Americans in Paris' by Christine Lavin
- "Two Tickets to Paradise" by Joey Dee and the Starliters
- "Un africain à Paris" by Joe Harris
- "Un boléro à Pigalle" by Eric Demarsan
- "Un enfant quitte Paris" by Jean Ferrat
- "Un être humain à Paris" by Dani (singer)
- "Un gamin de Paris" by Yves Montand
- "Un garçon à Paris" by Claude Morgan (member of Bimbo Jet)
- "Un monstre à Paris" by -M-
- "Un Paris-Soir sur le visage" by Michel Delpech
- "Un sicilien à Paris" by Domenico Modugno
- "Under Paris Stars" by Pierre Legendre and the Paris International Orchestra
- "Une américaine à Paris" by Jeane Manson
- "Une femme dans Paris" by Caterina Valente
- "Une journée à Paris" by Don Rosenbaum
- "Une Parisienne" by Bill Pritchard
- "Une nuit à Paris" by France Gall
- "Une nuit Paris" by E. Ray Goetz
- "Une pensée pour Maurice" (from the stageshow Moulin Rouge)
- "Une oosbif à Paris" by Mattie Konig
- "Une Rose de Paris" by Nana Mouskouri
- "The Urchins of Paris" by Russ Conway
- "Vals de Montmartre" by Joe Rene and his Orchestra
- "Valse Paris minuit" by Nasmak
- "Valse Parisienne" by Brunon Baron
- "Valse Parisienne" by Lee S. Roberts
- "Vel' d'hiv'" by Yves Montand
- "Venise à Paris" by Al Bano
- "Versailles" by Eddie Warner
- "Versailles" by Herman Hupfeld, John Frederick Coots, Maury Rubens, Sammy Timberg and Clifford Grey
- "Versailles" by Modern Jazz Quartet
- "Versailles" by Serge Lancen
- "Versailles", music by Sigmund Romberg, lyrics by Harold Atteridge
- "Versailles"/"Vers-Ils" by Tiziana Ghiglioni
- "Versailles" by Trespassers W
- "Versailles" by White Soxx
- "Versailles Ballet" by Dimitri Tiomkin
- "Versailles Unknown" by Björn J:son Lindh
- "Vi kommer alltid ha Paris" by Veronica Maggio
- "Vi kommer fra Paris" by Inge Stauss
- "Viens à Paris" by Jacqueline François
- "Villa d'Este" by Jerry Mengo
- "Ville de lumière" by Gold
- "Vine à Paris" by Maria-Cinta
- "Voyage vers Paris" by Isabelle Peruzat
- "Vraiment Paris" by Tab Two
- "Wait 'Til Paris Sees Us" from the musical So This Is Paris
- "Wait Till You See Paris" from the musical The French Line
- "Waiting for Paris" by Roy Milton
- "Walking at the Trocadero" by Lionel Hampton
- "Walking in Paris" by Joseph Cotton
- "Walking in the Rain of Paris" by Modern Talking
- "Walk in Paris" by Mark Knopfler
- "Waltz at Maxim's" from the musical Gigi
- "Waltz of Paris" by Stanley Black And His Orchestra
- "The Way They Do It in Paris" (from New Moon (1940 film))
- "We Met in Paris" by Ernie Kemm
- "We Met in Paris" by Mattic
- "We Met in Paris, Got Lost in Tokyo" by Akil Hikari
- "Weekend in Paris" by Fiddlygig
- "Weekend in Paris" by Sheena Easton
- "Wenn es Nacht wird in Paris" by Caterina Valente
- "We're Going on a Tuppenny Bus Ride" by Anita Harris
- "We're Gonna Rock Paris" by Ricky Spontane
- "We're Off to See Parie" (children's song)
- "Werewolf in Paris" by la Union
- "Wetback on the Left Bank" by the Herdsmen Play Paris
- "What Are We Gonna Get 'Er Indoors?" by Dennis Waterman & George Cole
- "Whatever Happened to Paris?" by Robb Johnson
- "What's It Like in Paris?" by Percy Faith
- "When an Englishman Marries a Parisian" music by Harry Carroll and Sigmund Romberg; lyrics by Harold Atteridge
- "When Flying Machines Begin to Fly, We Never Shall Stay at Home. Away We'll Skip on a Half-day Trip to Paris, Perhaps, or Rome..." (from The Beauty of Bath)
- "When I Play in Paris the Fellows I Know, All Are Crazy, Don't Know Why" from Kissing Time
- "When I Take My Morning Promenade" by Marie Lloyd
- "When Paris Cries" by Erroll Garner
- "When Paris Goes to Sleep" by Franck Pourcel
- "When Paris Was a Woman" by Melissa Manchester
- "When Strolling Down a Boulevard" from the musical comedy 'The Circus Girl'
- "Where Do You Go to My Lovely?" by Peter Sarstedt
- "Where Is the Elysses Montmartre?" by Mad Professor
- "While Paris Sleeps" by Adriano
- "Who Said Gay Paris?" by Cole Porter
- "The Whole of Paris Dreams of Love" by Angèle Durand
- "The Whores of Paris" by Bernie Taupin
- "Wie Damals in Paris" by Blue Diamonds
- "Wij zijn de Slijpers van Parijs" by De Slijpers
- "Wilmer I Paris" by Wilmer X
- "Window Shopping in Paris" by Jeffrey
- "The Windows of Paris" by Lawrence Welk
- "Winter in Paris" by Dag Kolsrud
- "Wolves of Paris" by Cris Wiliamson
- "The World Has Maidens Sweet and Pretty Where'er We Go / The Gay Grisettes of Paris City..." from the musical comedy The School Girl
- "Wrap Her Up" by Elton John
- "Y'a d'la joie" by Charles Trenet
- "Y'a qu'Paris pour ça" by Zizi Jeanmaire
- "Y a rien comme Paris" by Jeanne Couet
- "Yella!!" by Yella (produced by members of Tom Tom Club)
- "Yellow Man of Paris" by XIT
- "You and I (In Old Versailles)" by George Gershwin
- "You Can Be Lonely in Paris" by Milton DeLugg
- "You, Dear" by Eloise
- "You Don't Know Paris" from the musical comedy Fifty Million Frenchmen
- "You Haven't Lived Until You've Played the Palace" by Carol Channing
- "You Will Find Your Love (In Paris)" by Patti Page
- "You'd Love to Live in Paris" by Helen Trix
- "You'd Think You Were in Paris" from the musical The Man Who Owns Broadway
- "You'll Find Me at Maxim's" from the operetta The Merry Widow
- "You Make Take Me Round Paris" from Yes, Uncle!
- "Young Parisians" by Adam and the Ants
- "You're in Paris" from the musical Ben Franklin in Paris
- "You're OK" by Ottawan
- "You're the Top" by Cole Porter
- "Zazie (dans le mêtro)" by Sidi Bou Said (band)

== Videos using the cityscape ==
- the video for "I Will Possess Your Heart" by Death Cab for Cutie was shot in New York City, London, Paris, Frankfurt, Tokyo, Hokkaido, Tunis, Carthage, Bangkok, Siem Reap, and Phnom Penh.
