= Give Me a Band and a Bandana =

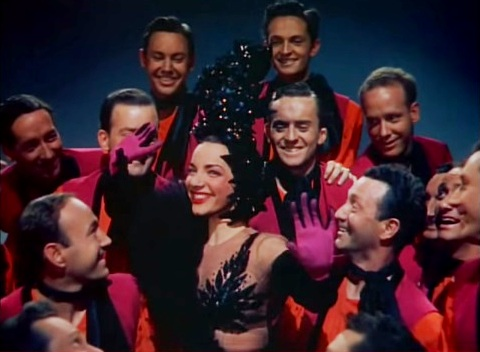

Song by Carmen Miranda
- Released: 1944
- Genre: Pop; Samba
- Composers: Nacio Herb Brown; Leo Robin

"Give Me a Band and a Bandana" is a song by Nacio Herb Brown and Leo Robin, performed by Carmen Miranda in the 1944 20th Century Fox film Greenwich Village. The song includes excerpts from "O Que É que a Baiana Tem?", by Dorival Caymmi, and "Quando Eu Penso na Bahia", by Ary Barroso and Luís Peixoto.

== Performance ==
Carmen Miranda's performance of "Give Me a Band and a Bandana" in Greenwich Village takes on a new dimension when she begins singing in Portuguese, as pointed out by Sarah Wright and Tom Whittaker in their book Locating the Voice in Film: Critical Approaches and Global Practices. During the performance, Carmen incorporates lines from two of her favorite sambas: "O Que É que a Baiana Tem?", by Dorival Caymmi, and "Quando Eu Penso na Bahia", by Ary Barroso and Luís Peixoto. The English lyrics of the song reference her famous pronunciation in a Broadway show number from The Streets of Paris, when she sings: "Give me a rhythm that is Latin / And I'll show Manhattan / My 'souse' American tricks". As she exclaims the word "samba!", the band enters the samba rhythm, with Carmen dancing energetically before singing parts of "O Que É Que a Baiana Tem?". She immediately follows with the verses of "Quando Eu Penso na Bahia", then returns to the English lyrics of "Give Me a Band and a Bandana".

== Review ==
The critic Bosley Crowther from New York Times praised the use of Technicolor in the film, also highlighting the presence of Carmen Miranda. On the other hand, Peggy Simmonds from The Miami News acknowledged the value of the Technicolor and Carmen's performance, but lamented that the film did not do justice to her talent. She considered the production disappointing, and the actress's lines less impactful compared to her previous films, although she still shined in the scenes in which she appeared.

== Cultural impact ==
The singer Camila Cabello used "Give Me a Band and a Bandana" as inspiration for her performance of "Don't Go Yet" at the 2021 MTV Video Music Awards.
