= Band of Gold =

"Band of Gold" may refer to:

- "Band of Gold" (1955 song), a 1955 song popularized by Don Cherry
- "Band of Gold" (Freda Payne song), a 1970 song popularized by Freda Payne and various other artists
  - Band of Gold (album), a 1970 album by Freda Payne that capitalized on the hit of the same name
- "Band of Gold", a song by Greg Brown on his 1990 album Down in There
- Band of Gold (band), a Dutch group who had a hit with a medley called "Love Songs Are Back Again"
- Band of Gold (TV series), a programme on British television
- That Little Band of Gold, a 1915 film starring Fatty Arbuckle
