= Saval (surname) =

Saval is a surname. Notable people with the surname include:

- Dany Saval (born 1942), French actress
- Manolita Saval (1914–2001), Spanish actress and singer
- Manuel Saval (1956–2009), Mexican actor
- Nikil Saval, American writer, editor and activist
- Paco Saval (born 1950), Chilean musician and composer

== See also ==
- Savall (surname)
