= Aqua Bassino =

Scottish DJ

Aqua Bassino is an alias of Jason Nicholas Robertson, an Edinburgh-based electronic producer and DJ. He has released 2 studio albums, 3 EPs and 4 singles of downtempo and house on F Communications.

== Biography ==
Jason was a bass player for several jazz-funk bands before moving to the studio to become an electronic musician. He issued his first EP, Swirl, on the famous French label F Communications, in 1995, followed by three more (Deeper, Pools and Wave) before his debut album, Beat's n Bobs, in 2001, which melded downtempo and house beats with elements of jazz, soul and blues. The album featured Scottish saxophonist Martin Kershaw, British jazz singer Niki King and African diva Nahawa Doumbia, who worked extensively with Frederic Galliano. He dedicated the track "Na Na's Waltz" to his grandmother.

The single "Baby C'Mon" followed in early '02 with remixes by deep house don Ron Trent and Belgian techno producer Fabrice Lig.

In his spare time, Robertson produces laid-back house and downtempo for Statra under his Jay Salino alias.

== Style ==
His music is pervaded by a sense of melancholy, which can be traced back to his upbringing in a desolate, grey, post-industrial Edinburgh.

== Discography ==
=== Studio albums ===
- Beat's n Bobs (2001)
- Rue de Paris (2006)

=== Extended plays ===
- Swirl (1995)
- Deeper (1997)
- Pools (1998)

== Critical reception ==
His debut album, Beat's n Bobs, was met with mixed to positive reviews. AllMusic's Joshua Glazer noted the lounge and jazz influence on the album's sound, as well as its similarity to fellow French musician St. Germain's brand of jazz-house, writing "Sticking with the proven formula of electronic musicians trying to be jazz musicians, Jason Robertson's Aqua Bassino project clearly owes a lot of influence to St. Germain and more importantly, the original smoky lounge jazz from which both artists' music is based." He also pointed a somewhat lack of originality: "To say that Aqua Bassino is predictable would not be entirely fair. To say that it is too safe in some places would be more than appropriate." BBC's Andy Puleston was more enthusiastic, calling it "a sumptuous mix of styles" that "fuses deep house with nu jazz, downtempo and African rhythms to create a sound that is both accomplished and travelled". He added "Boasting variation, subtlety and strong collaborations Beat's n Bobs is a triumphant debut that will be equally at home in the DJ's box as it will be in the CD rack next to your sofa."
