= Savall =

Savall is a surname. Notable people with the surname include:

- Jordi Savall (born 1941), Catalan conductor and viol player
- Arianna Savall (born 1972), Catalan singer, harpist, and composer, daughter of Jordi

== See also ==
- Saval (surname)
