= Band of Gold (band) =

- Origin: Netherlands
- Genres: Pop
- Labels: Innervision, RCA

Band of Gold was a Dutch male and female vocal/instrumental group, who released a single in 1984 called "Love Songs are Back Again (Medley)" taken from their debut and only album The Album. It was written and produced by Paco Saval and released on the RCA label. It entered the Dutch, Belgian, UK, Irish and US charts and peaked at #12, #18, #24, #19 and #64 respectively.

"Love Songs are Back Again (Medley)" was Band of Gold's only chart appearance making the band a One-hit wonder.

== Background ==
The song begins and ends with the self written theme song "Love Songs Are Back Again" with a medley of six classic soul ballads in between:

1. Let's Put It All Together - The Stylistics
2. Betcha By Golly, Wow - The Stylistics
3. Side Show - Barry Biggs
4. Have You Seen Her - The Chi-Lites
5. Reunited - Peaches & Herb
6. You Make Me Feel Brand New - The Stylistics
7. Kiss and Say Goodbye - The Manhattans
