= Bill Pritchard =

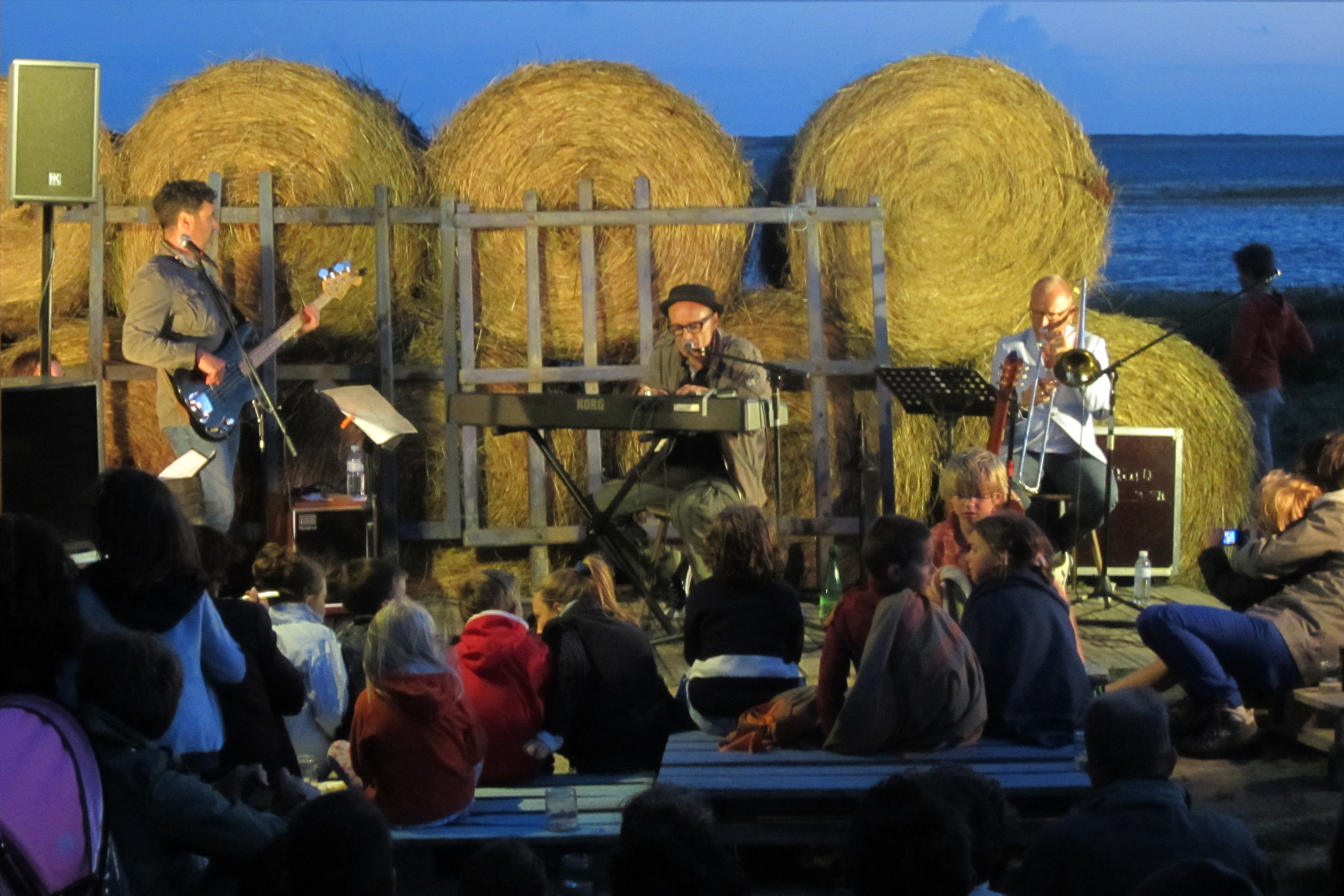

Background information
- Origin: Lichfield, Staffordshire, England
- Genres: Indie pop
- Years active: 1987–present
- Labels: Third Mind, PIAS Recordings, I.R.S., Ncompass
- Formerly of: Beatitude
- Website: http://www.billpritchardmusic.com

Bill Pritchard is a British singer-songwriter, instrumentalist (guitars, keyboards), musical arranger and producer. Despite being little known in his native country he has achieved considerable recognition in France and elsewhere.

== Biography ==
Pritchard was born in Lichfield, Staffordshire. His eponymous debut album was released in 1987 on the Third Mind label, with a second following in 1988. He then signed to Belgian label PIAS Recordings, his first release for them a split album with Daniel Darc. In 1989 he released Three Months, Three Weeks and Two Days, produced by Étienne Daho, which was popular in the US after exposure from MTV for the single "Tommy & Co", which featured backing vocals from Françoise Hardy. His 1991 album Jolie was produced by Ian Broudie, and gave him a breakthrough in Japan and Canada. In 1995 he formed the band Beatitude, releasing the single "Baby in Brylcreem". He made his first come-back in 2005 with the album "By Paris, by taxi, by accident" produced and performed by French producer Thomas Deligny and released by Universal/AZ. Bill did a tour in France that did end up at the Olympia as opening band of Daniel Darc's concert. Bill has recently signed a record deal with Tapete Records and will be releasing a new album called "A Trip To The Coast" in the spring of 2014, produced by longtime collaborator Tim Bradshaw.

== Discography ==
=== Albums ===
- Bill Pritchard (1987), Third Mind
- Half A Million (1988), Third Mind
- Parce Que (1988), PIAS – concept album with Daniel Darc
- Three Months, Three Weeks & Two Days (1989), PIAS
- Jolie (1991), PIAS
- Happiness And Other Crimes (1998), Ncompass – reissued in 2009 with bonus CD
- By Paris, By Taxi, By Accident (2005), AZ/Universal Music
- Trip To the Coast (2014), Tapete Records
- Mother Town Hall (2016), Tapete Records
- Midland Lullabies (2019), Tapete Records
- Rendez-vous Streets – Pritchard et Lo (2019), Water Music
- Sings Poems by Patrick Woodcock (2023), Tapete Records
- Haunted (2026), Tapete Records

=== Compilation albums ===
- Death of Bill Posters (1988), Third Mind – compilation of Bill Pritchard and Half A Million

=== Singles ===
- "Pas de plaisanterie" (1988), Third Mind
- "Tommy & Co" (1989), PIAS
- "Invisible State" (1989), PIAS
- "Invisible State" EP (1989), I.R.S.
- "Romance sans parole" (1989), PIAS
- "In The Summer" (1991), PIAS
- "Number Five" (1991), PIAS
- "I'm In Love Forever" (1991), PIAS
- "Sweethearts" (1991), Fnac
- "Baby in Brylcreem" (1995), Tora! – with Beatitude
- "Every Loser In London" (1998), Ncompass
- "By Paris, by Taxi, by Accident" (2005), Universal
- "Trentham" (2014) Tapete Records
- "Yeah Yeah Girl" (2014) Tapete Records

=== Compilation appearances ===
- Future Tense (1986), Third Mind: "Grey Parade", "Cecile", "The Invisible State", "Springtime In Prague"
- Un printemps 89 (1989), Les Inrockuptibles: "Sometimes" (with Étienne Daho)
- I'm Your Fan: The Songs Of Leonard Cohen (1991), Atlantic: "I'm Your Man"
- L'équipe à Jojo (The songs of Joe Dassin) (1993), Le Village Vert: "La Fleur aux dents"
- The Great Lawnmower Conspiracy (1997), Ncompass
- A Tribute to Polnareff (tribute to Michel Polnareff) (1999), XIII Bis/EMI: "Je suis un homme"

=== Guest appearances ===
- Concorde Music Club – Stereo-Fictions (2002), Soyuz: vocals on "In The Past"
- Concorde Music Club – Alternative-Fictions (remix album of Stereo-Fictions) (2003), Soyuz/Twin Fizz: vocals on "In The Past"

=== Production ===
- Stan Cuesta – The Interior Journey (1993), Music Production
