= Jacqueline François =

French singer

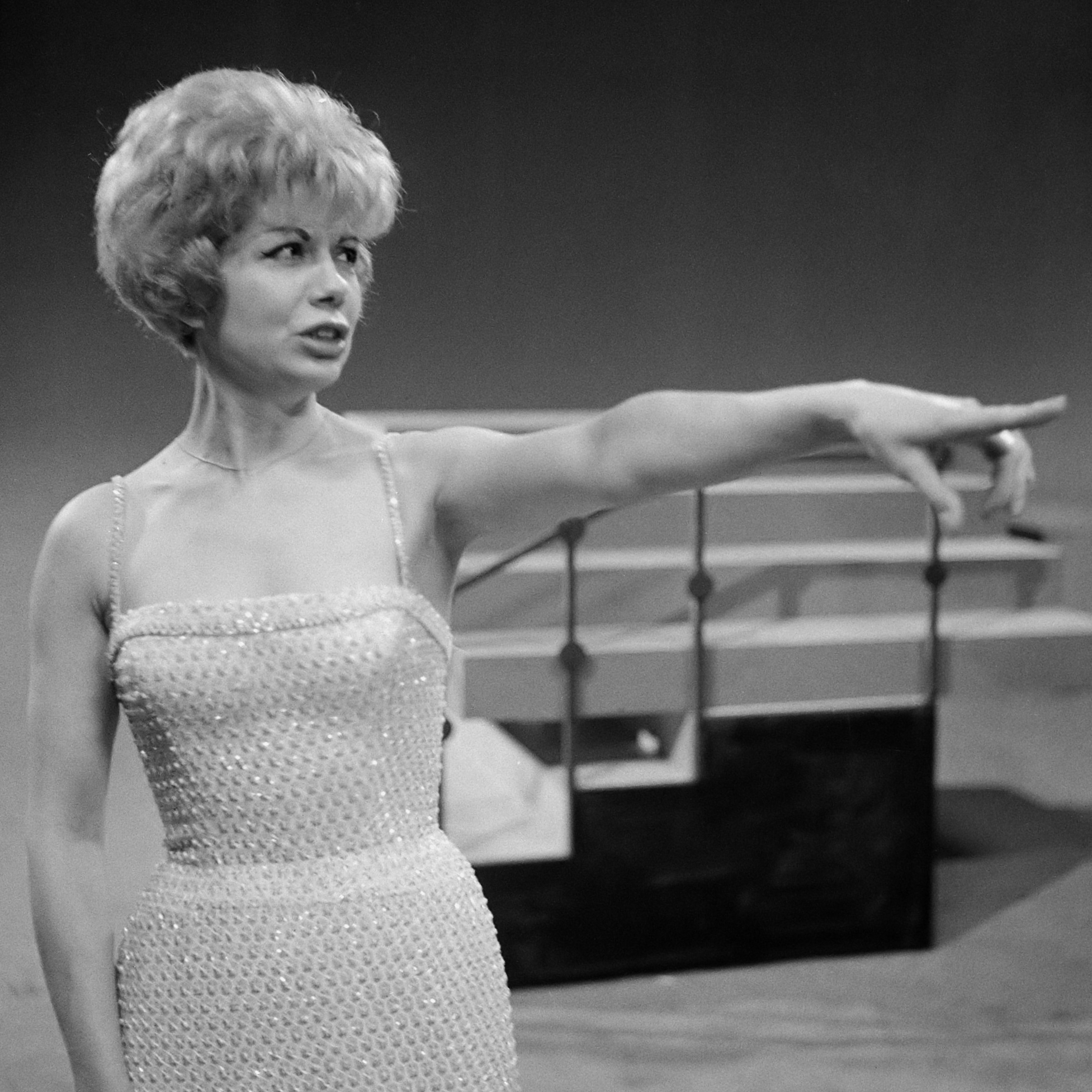
Image of Jacqueline François

Jacqueline François (real name: Jacqueline Guillemautot; 1922, Neuilly-sur-Seine – 2009, Paris) was a French singer.

She was very popular in after-war France and was the first French female singer who sold over a million records. One of her most famous songs is "Mademoiselle de Paris".

François is also the first name of her only son, born of her marriage with Henri Decker.
