= Mano Solo =

French singer

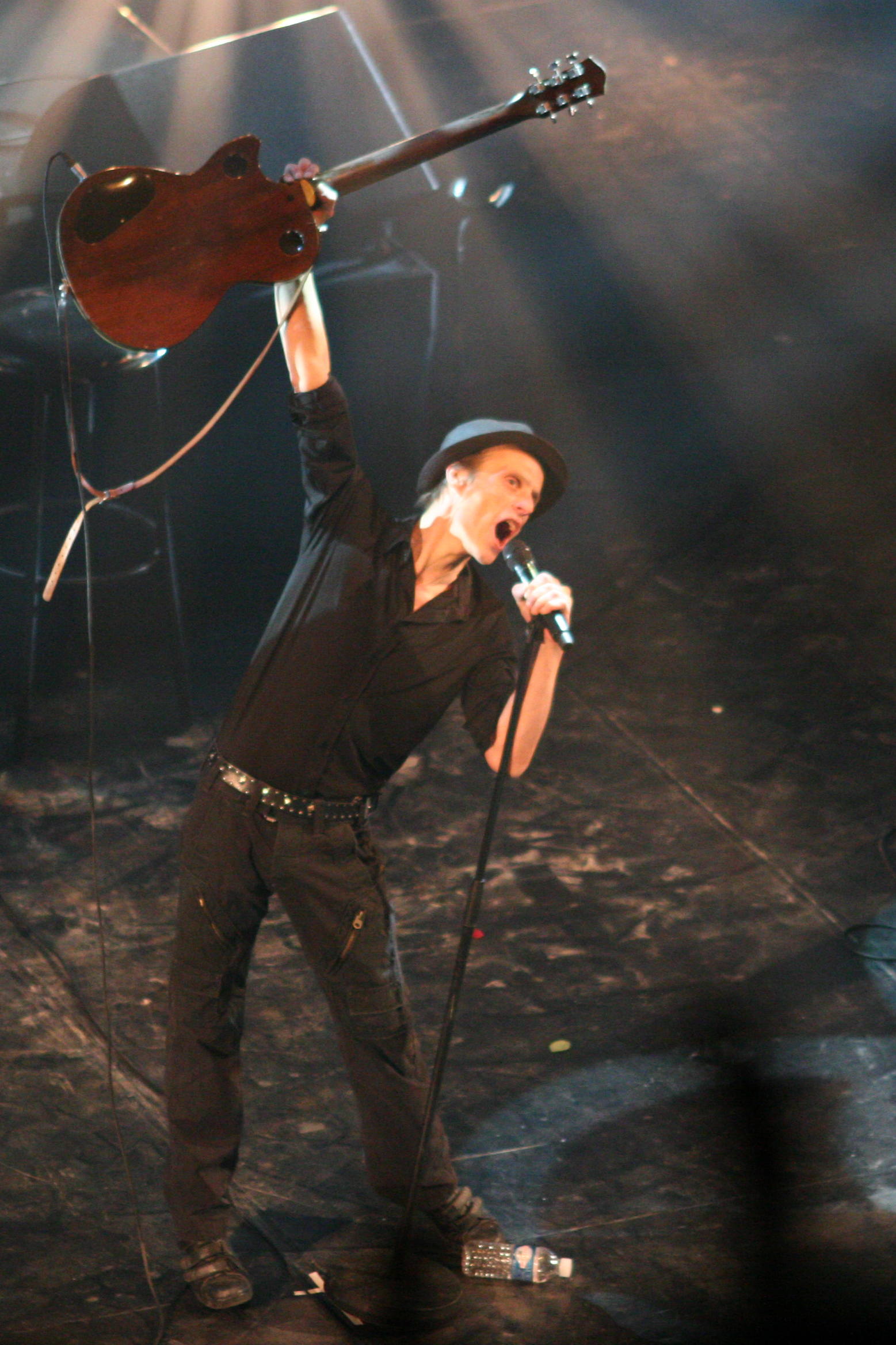
Mano Solo in 2007

Mano Solo (24 April 1963 – 10 January 2010), born Emmanuel Cabut, was a French singer. He was born in Châlons-sur-Marne on 24 April 1963 to the illustrator Cabu and Isabelle Monin, co-founder of the ecology-related magazine, La Gueule ouverte.

== Early life ==
From the age of 17, Mano Solo played guitar in a punk rock group, les Chihuahuas. He began singing his own compositions in the early nineties. He then sang regularly at the Tourtour theatre in Paris, alongside singers Marousse and P'tit Louis.

== Recording career ==
His first album, La Marmaille Nue, was released in 1993 and sold 100,000 copies in the first year. His second album, Les Années Sombres ("The Dark Years"), a somber album that also went gold in its first months was released in 1995. In 1996, he regrouped with part of the Chihuahuas for the album Frères Misère (Brothers in Misery). Its rhythms are closer to punk, and the texts are more topical than his solo albums. With little media attention, the album failed to meet immediate success.

The release of a new album: Je sais pas trop ("I don't really know") was in 1997. Recorded live and featuring, once again, original melodies and sounds, it was a Gold record in France. Two years later, Mano Solo recorded the double album Internationale Shalala, live at the Tourtour, a little theatre where he played regularly since the beginning of his music career. He sings and plays guitar on the album, accompanied only by another guitarist, Jean-Louis Solans. The songs come from earlier Solo albums, except for Shalala, a hymn of "inner revolution" that the artist sang together with his audience at the end of every concert, with a positive and dynamic message.

His second live album, La Marche (The Walk), was released in 2002. It consists mostly of songs from the album Dehors ("Outside"), released earlier (August 2000). With the album comes a DVD featuring photos and videos from concerts, and CG animations from Mano Solo's imagination.

In 2004, Les animals was released. As with other Solo albums the sound was new, the lyrics contained much poetic language, and the songs were performed energetically. Some titles were new recordings of old songs. The song Botzaris, recorded with Les Têtes Raides, was featured on the album. Solo appeared on two tracks on the album Dans le caillou by Karpatt.

== In the Garden ==
In 2006, Mano Solo did not renew his contract with his label, Warner. He self-produced his new album In the Garden, announced for March 2007. He offered this record by subscription sale starting on 18 September 2006 : and every month after, subscribers get access to new material (songs or videos). The subscription fee goes towards the album's promotional costs.

== Other works ==
Parallel to his singing career, Solo developed other talents, including art. He designed the covers of some of his albums. He founded his own publishing imprint (La Marmaille Nue), which released two of his own books: a poetry anthology, Je suis là ("I am here") (1995), and a novel, Joseph sous la pluie ("Joseph in the rain") (1996).

From 2001, Solo became very interested in the Internet; he created and developed his own website around his artistic, social, and political interests, while encouraging his visitors to be creative themselves.

== Death ==
Solo had been HIV positive for years secondary to his youthful drug use. He was rushed to the hospital after a concert in Paris on 12 November 2009. There he died at the age of 46 on 10 January 2010, due to his illness. He is buried at the Père Lachaise cemetery in Paris.

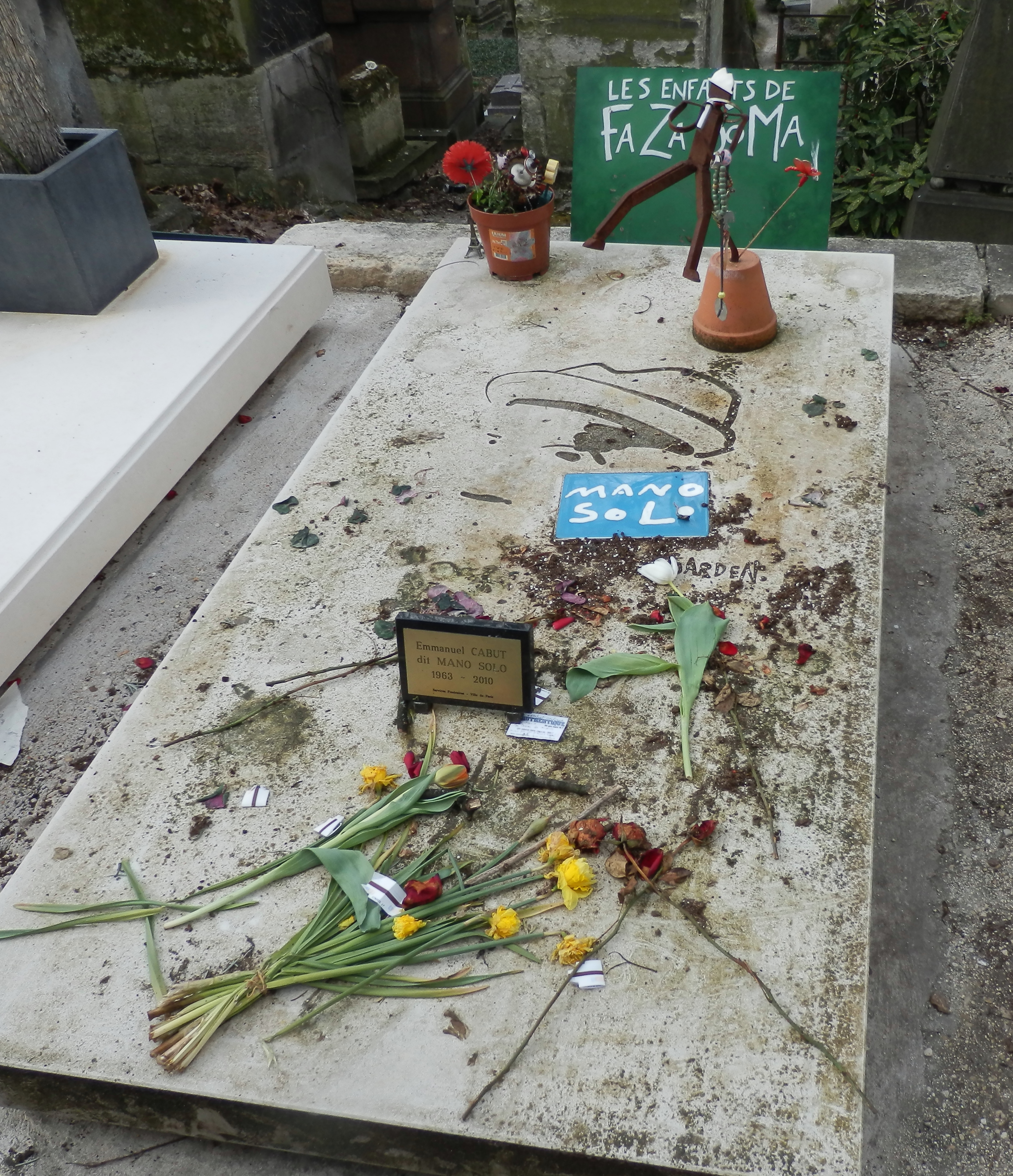
Mano Solo's grave, Paris in March 2013

== Discography ==
- La Marmaille nue (1993)
- Les Années sombres (1995)
- Frères misère (1996), with Les Frères misère
- Je sais pas trop (1997)
- Internationale Shalala (Live at the Tourtour) (1999)
- Dehors (2000)
- La Marche (2002), live
- Les Animals (2004)
- In the Garden (2007)
- Rentrer au port (2009)
