= Bernheim =

Bernheim is a surname. Notable people with the surname include:

- Alain Bernheim (1931–2022), French Masonic author
- Alain Bernheim (producer) (1922–2009), French-born American film producer and literary agent
- Cathy Bernheim (1946–2025), French feminist writer, novelist and journalist
- Emile Bernheim (1886–1985), Belgian industrialist
- Emmanuèle Bernheim (1955–2017), French writer
- Ernst Bernheim (1850–1942), German-Jewish historian
- Erwin Bernheim (1925–2007), Swiss founder of Mondaine Watch Ltd.
- Hippolyte Bernheim (1837–1919), French Jewish physician and neurologist
- Gilles Bernheim (born 1952), chief rabbi of France 2009–2013
- Isaac Wolfe Bernheim (1848–1945), Jewish distiller and philanthropist, founder of the I. W. Harper bourbon brand and the Bernheim Arboretum and Research Forest
- Louis Bernheim (1861–1931), Belgian general
- Mary Bernheim (Hare) (1902–1997), British-American biochemist

== See also ==
- Bernheim petition, 1933 petition leading to the vacation of Nazi anti-Jewish legislation in German Upper Silesia until 1937.
- 3467 Bernheim, an asteroid
- Bernheim Arboretum and Research Forest, a park located twenty miles south of Louisville, Kentucky
- Bernheim-Jeune, Art gallery and publisher in Paris
