= Fabrice Lig =

Belgian musician

Fabrice Lig, also known as Soul Designer (born Fabrice Ligny; 1972 in Charleroi, Belgium), is a techno music producer.
