= Paco Saval =

Chilean-born German keyboard player and producer

Paco Saval (born Francisco Leiva-Saval; June 25, 1950) is a keyboard player, producer, composer and singer based in Cologne.

== Biography ==
Paco Saval was born in 1950 in Santiago, Chile, where he made his first records at the age of 15. In 1969 Saval moved to Madrid to study sound engineering. From there he moved to Leeds in 1975, where he worked with musicians of the Leeds College of Music. In 1978 Saval came to Cologne and played in the band Santiago that won the Deutscher Schallplattenpreis in 1979. From 1980 he played in the Food Band and with many other bands such as the live band of the RTL Nachtshow, a late night show on German television. Saval was on tour with Rory Gallagher and Sally Oldfield.

As producer of the Band of Gold he wrote the song "Love Songs Are Back Again" that stayed in the US Top 50 and UK singles charts for several weeks. For Miguel Ríos he wrote the song "En El Parque". Together with Knaller Delbrügge he composed and produced several jingles for German TV-station ProSieben.

Today Paco Saval plays in the Lance Harrison Band and together with Wolfram Burgtorf at Burgtorf/Saval.

Paco Saval is very interested in commercial aviation, this was an inspiration for his song "Connie", an homage to the Lockheed Constellation.

== Discography ==
=== Solo albums ===
- 1978 Borderline
- 1985 Piña Colada
