= The Streets of Paris =

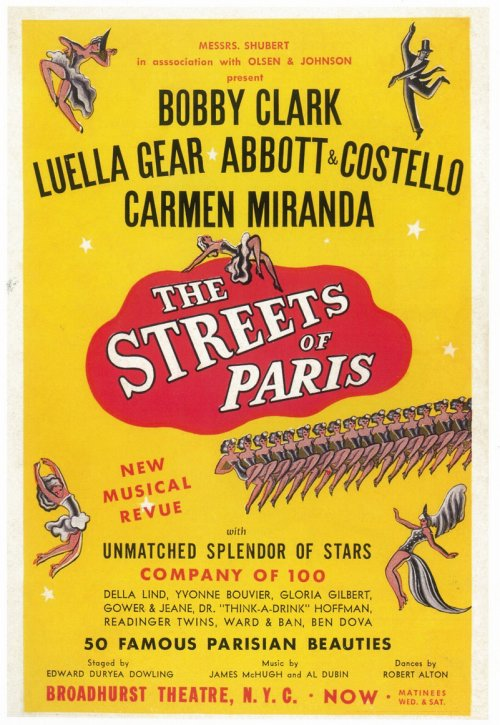
- The Streets of Paris poster.
- Original language: English
- Written by: Tom McKnight; Charles Sherman; S. Jay Kaufman
- Genre: musical revue

Premiere
- Date: May 29, 1939 (Boston); June 19, 1939 (Broadway)
- Place: Broadhurst Theatre; New York City

The Streets of Paris is a musical revue featuring Bobby Clark, Luella Gear, Abbott and Costello and Carmen Miranda, debuted on May 29, 1939 in Boston and on June 19, 1939 in New York. Had two hours and-a-half, with the interval. The musical was staged from June 1939 to 10 February 1940, totaling 274 presentations.

== Production ==
Olsen and Johnson in partnership with Lee Shubert were working on their newest musical revue, The Streets of Paris. The first rehearsals for the show began on May 2, 1939 in New York. Before going to New York, Streets of Paris debuted in Boston on May 29, 1939, obtaining a great success of criticism and public. Some of the city newspapers speculated that the show had been extended in more a week.

Debuted on June 19, 1939, in the Broadhurst Theatre on Broadway, Manhattan, New York. The show introduced Carmen Miranda to the American public, and marked the debut of Abbott & Costello, Gower Champion and Jeanne Tyler in Broadway musicals.

The musical was divided into two acts with songs written by Jimmy McHugh and Al Dubin, working for the first time together. The sketches were written by Tom McKnight, Charles Sherman and Jay S. Kaufman, with costumes designed by Irene Sharaff, scenery for the show was designed by Larry Goldwasser, with direction of choreography by Robert Alton, and directed by Edward Dowling Duryea.

The Streets of Paris ended their presentations in New York in February 1940, starting then a tour by East Coast American, through Philadelphia, Washington DC, Pittsburgh, Toronto, Detroit, Cleveland and Chicago, where was closed on May 8, 1940.

== Cast ==
Abbott and Costello and Carmen Miranda in publicity photo of The Streets of Paris.

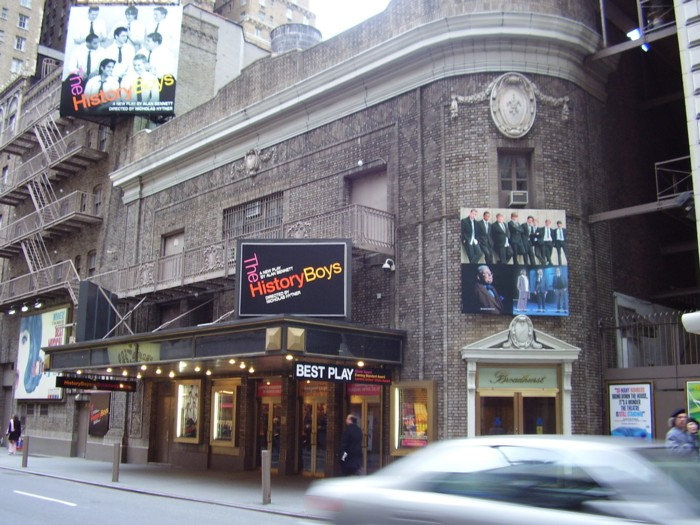
The Broadhurst Theatre in 2006.

Featured artist:

- Luella Gear
- Bobby Clark
- Abbott and Costello
- Carmen Miranda

Secondary artists: (in alphabetical order)

- Adele Murphy
- Alice Anthony
- Betty Bartley
- Ben Dova
- Billy Branch & Co.
- Bernice Smith
- Claire Anderson
- Cliff Hall
- Charles Hoffman
- Daisy and Violet Hilton
- Edward Wells
- Eileen O'Day
- Enis Beyer
- Evelyn Hylton
- Flora Bowes
- Frances O'Day
- Gloria Gilbert
- Grete Natzler (as Della Lind)
- Gower & Jeanne
- Halldis Prince
- Henning Irgens
- Hugh Ellsworth
- Jackie Gateley
- Janice Nicholson
- Jo & Jeanne Readinger
- John McCauley
- Kalli Barton
- Kate Hylton
- Lincoln Bouvier
- Lincoln Wilmerton
- Lu Ann Meredith
- Magdi Kari
- Margo Hylton
- Margaret Irving
- Margaret Hall
- Mary Ann Parker
- Maxine Martin
- Mischa Pompianov
- Mildred Hall
- Milton Watson
- Nancy Grace
- Olive Nicholson
- Peggy Gallimore
- Richard D'Arcy
- Ruth Merman
- Sadella Wagner
- Sharlie Hall
- Sidney Marion (as Sid Marion)
- Thelma Temple
- Trudy Burke
- Yvonne Bouvier
- Ward and Van

== Musical numbers ==
Act I

- Theatre Marigny Dressing Room ... The Callboy, Costumer, Wardrobe Mistress, Girls.
- The Streets of Paris ... Enis Beyer, Lynda Grey, Margaret Hall, Mildred Hughes, Nancy Lewis, Maxine Martin, Frances O'Day, Halldis Prince.
- The Ensemble Speaks ... Mesdemoiselles: Claire Anderson, Mary Ann, Alice Anthony, Betty Bartley, Kalli Barton, Flora Bowes, Trudy Burke, Jackie Gateley, Peggy Gallimore, Lu Ann Meredith, Ruth Merman, Adele Murphy, Janice Nicholson, Olive Nicholson, Eileen O'Day, Mary Ann Parker, Thelma Temple.

Messieurs: Norman Abbott, Edward Browne, Richard D'Arcy, Hugh Ellsworth, William Hawley, Henning Irgens, Mortimer O'Brien, Mischa Pompianov, Edward Wells.

- In Paris ... Luella Gear, Margaret Irving, John McCauley.
- Thanks for the Francs ... Milton Watson, Margo, Kate and Evelyn Hylton.
- The Photographer ... Jackie Gately, Buddy Roberts, John McCauley, Luella Gear, Bobby Clark.
- Danger in the Dark ... Della Lind, Milton Watson with Jo & Jeanne Readinger, Hugh Ellsworth, Richard D'Arcy and Edward Wells.
- The Queen of Paris ... Luella Gear, Gower Champion.
- Three Little Maids ... Margo, Kate and Evelyn Hylton.
- Is It Possible: A Moment in Montmartre ... Bobby Clark, Della Lind with Madge and Billy Branch & Co.
- Rendezvous Time in Paree ... Milton Watson, Yvonne Bouvier with Kalli Barton, Luann Meredith, Mary Ann Parker, Olive Nicholson, Adele Murphy, Alice Anthony, Betty Bartley, Jackie Gately.
- Monsieur Think A Drink Hoffman ... Bernice Smith, Sadella Wagner, Mischa Pompianov, Richard D'Arcy.
- The Convict's Return ... Luella Gear, Bobby Clark.
- South American Way ... Carmen Miranda.

Act II

- History Is Made at Night ... Enis Beyer, Halldis Prince, Maxine Martin, Nancy Grey, Margart Hall, Mildred Hall, Frances O'Day.
- A Noel Coward Custom ... Bobby Clark, Margaret Irving, Luella Gear.
- We Can Live on Love ... Milton Watson, Yvonne Bouvier with Gower and Jeanne, Claire Anderson, Gloria Gilbert.
- Robert the Roue ... Bobby Clark.
- Rest Cure ... Sid Marion, Cliff Hall, Margaret Irving, John McCauley, Lincoln Wilmerton, Hennings Irgens, Frances O'Day, Hugh Ellsworth, Enis Beyer, Edward Wells, Jackie Gateley.
- The Spy ... Bobby Clark, Luella Gear, Lincoln Bouvier, John McCauley and Edward Wells.
- Reading Writing and A Little Bit Of Rhythm ... Margo, Kate, Evelyn Hylton with Jo & Jeanne Readinger, Gower and Jeanne.
- Three Little Maids, Later ... Margo, Kate and Evelyn Hylton.
- That's Music ... Cliff Hall, Sid Marion, Bobby Clark.

Finale

- The French Have A Word For It ... Bobby Clark, Luella Gear, Sid Marion, Cliff Hall, Carmen Miranda.
