= Black & Blue Records =

French record label

- Founded: 1968
- Genre: Jazz, blues
- Country of origin: France

Black & Blue Records was a record company and label founded in France in 1968 that specialized in blues and jazz.

Black & Blue reissued music from small American labels before producing original releases. Some of these releases were by black musicians who were visiting France. The label's catalogue included music by Cat Anderson, Ray Bryant, Milt Buckner, Panama Francis, Earl Hines, Illinois Jacquet, Jo Jones, Sammy Price, and Buddy Tate.

== Roster ==
- The Aces
- Monty Alexander
- Luther Allison
- Cat Anderson
- Louis Armstrong
- Kokomo Arnold
- Georges Arvanitas
- Harold Ashby
- Marcel Azzola
- Gerard Badini
- Mickey Baker
- Chris Barber
- Barrett Sisters
- Sammy Benskin
- Buster Benton
- François Biensan
- Wallace Bishop
- Little Joe Blue
- Bunny Briggs
- Lonnie Brooks
- Big Bill Broonzy
- Clarence Gatemouth Brown
- Ray Bryant
- Milt Buckner
- Eddie "Guitar" Burns
- Billy Butler
- Don Byas
- Benny Carter
- Al Casey
- Eddie Chamblee
- Doc Cheatham
- Eddy Clearwater
- Arnett Cobb
- Cozy Cole
- Bill Coleman
- Michael Coleman
- Gene Conners
- Johnny Copeland
- Larry Coryell
- Stanley Cowell
- Wallace Davenport
- Eddie Lockjaw Davis
- Larry Davis
- Wild Bill Davis
- Jimmy Dawkins
- Georges Delerue
- Sidney De Paris
- Vic Dickenson
- Lefty Dizz
- Bill Doggett
- Dorothy Donegan
- Dany Doriz
- Bobby Durham
- Harry Edison
- Sleepy John Estes
- David Eyges
- Pat Flowers
- Panama Francis
- Curtis Fuller
- Lowell Fulson
- Roy Gaines
- Leonard Gaskin
- Lloyd Glenn
- Stephane Grappelli
- Chuck Green
- Al Grey
- Tiny Grimes
- Johnny Guarnieri
- François Guin
- Buddy Guy
- Juanita Hall
- Lionel Hampton
- Roland Hanna
- John Hardee
- Bill Harris
- Coleman Hawkins
- J. C. Heard
- Heath Brothers
- Jessie Mae Hemphill
- Earl Hines
- Milt Hinton
- Major Holley
- Richard "Groove" Holmes
- John Lee Hooker
- Claude Hopkins
- Gaël Horellou
- Helen Humes
- J. B. Hutto
- Abdullah Ibrahim
- John Jackson
- Oliver Jackson
- Willis Jackson
- Illinois Jacquet
- Homesick James
- Alain Jean-Marie
- Cousin Joe
- Budd Johnson
- Candy Johnson
- Jimmy Johnson
- Luther "Georgia Boy" Johnson
- Hank Jones
- Jo Jones
- Jonah Jones
- Louis Jordan
- Taft Jordan
- George Kelly
- Joe Kennedy Jr.
- Guy Lafitte
- Byard Lancaster
- Ellis Larkins
- Baby Laurence
- Lafayette Leake
- The Legendary Blues Band
- Johnny Letman
- John Littlejohn
- Robert Lockwood Jr.
- Willie Mabon
- Rob McConnell
- Jay McShann
- Christian Morin
- Rose Murphy
- Joe Newman
- Sy Oliver
- Hot Lips Page
- Pinetop Perkins
- Andre Persiany
- Sammy Price
- Alvin Queen
- Ram Ramirez
- Jimmy Raney
- A.C. Reed
- Red Richards
- Gene Rodgers
- Jimmy Rogers
- Jimmy Rowles
- Otis Rush
- Maxim Saury
- Charlie Shavers
- Archie Shepp
- Johnny Shines
- Jimmy Shirley
- Little Mack Simmons
- Jean-Sebastien Simonoviez
- Hal Singer
- Magic Slim
- Memphis Slim
- Sunnyland Slim
- Jimmy Slyde
- Cliff Smalls
- Byther Smith
- Carrie Smith
- Floyd Smith
- Rex Stewart
- Slam Stewart
- Sonny Stitt
- Savoy Sultans
- Hubert Sumlin
- Roosevelt Sykes
- Buddy Tate
- Koko Taylor
- Ed Thigpen
- James Thomas
- Charles Thompson
- Sonny Thompson
- Claude Tissendier
- Big Joe Turner
- Joe Turner
- Norris Turney
- Rene Urtreger
- Eddie Vinson
- Phillip Walker
- T-Bone Walker
- John Watkins
- Carl Weathersby
- Junior Wells
- Gerald Wiggins
- Bob Wilber
- Claude Williams
- Cootie Williams
- Mary Lou Williams
- Rubberlegs Williams
- Teddy Wilson
- Kai Winding
- Jimmy Witherspoon
- Booty Wood
- Chris Woods
- Phil Woods
- Mighty Joe Young
- Marcel Zanini
