= Pierre Gossez =

Pierre Fernand Gossez (6 August 1928 – 9 December 2001) was a French jazz reedist.

== Life and career ==
Pierre Fernand Gossez was born in Valenciennes, France, on 6 August 1928.

Gossez was active as a sideman in many contexts in the 1950s, working with Noël Chiboust, Tony Murena, Jacques Hélian, Michel Legrand, and Martial Solal. He also began playing with Claude Bolling in 1956, and would work with him into the 1970s. In the 1960s he played with Sonny Grey, Michel Hausser, André Hodeir, Ivan Jullien, Guy Lafitte, and the Paris Jazz All Stars. Associations in the 1970s included Jullien again, Maxim Saury, Dany Doriz, and Gunther Schuller. He worked with Bob Quibel and with Solal for most of the 1980s. In 1986 played saxophone on Rendez-Vous (Jean-Michel Jarre album) album. The track is called Ron's Piece, in honor of Ronald "Ron" McNair, who was one of the astronauts who perished in the Space Shuttle Challenger disaster.

Gossez also recorded under the name Alan Gate for sessions under his own name in the 1960s.

Pierre Gossez died in Creil on 9 December 2001, at the age of 73.

== Sources ==
- Michel Laplace, "Pierre Gossez". The New Grove Dictionary of Jazz. 2nd edition, ed. Barry Kernfeld.
