= Robert Quibel =

French double bassist, arranger and bandleader

- Also known as: Bob Quibel
- Born: Robert Henri Maurice Quibel; October 12, 1930; Le Havre, France
- Died: January 17, 2013 (aged 82) Baillet-en-France, France
- Genre: Jazz
- Occupations: Composer, arranger, musician
- Instrument: Double bass
- Years active: 1958–1996

Robert Quibel, nicknamed Bob Quibel (October 12, 1930, Le Havre, France – January 17, 2013, Baillet-en-France, France) was a French double bassist, arranger and bandleader.

== Biography ==
The son of a chauffeur and a cleaning lady, he studied at the minor seminary in Rouen, but was expelled in 1947 for reading Alfred de Musset's La Confession d'un enfant du siècle.

Returning to live in Le Havre, he wrote small articles for local newspapers. He then worked for a magazine called "Butterfly", which published articles in French and English, where he was editor-translator and editorial secretary.

Robert Quibel, who in his youth had been a member of a choir and had learned harmony, started out in the late 1950s as a musician in variety and jazz bands. He was a member of the Benny Bennet and Jacques Hélian orchestras. He also played in the Olympia orchestra under Daniel Janin. In 1960, he was one of the singers in the vocal group Les Barclay, directed by Christiane Legrand.

From 1962, he was a member of Claude Bolling's trio, with drummer Peter Giger. In 1962–63, he can be heard in Claude Bolling's sextet, alongside Pierre Dutour or Jean-Claude Naude (trumpet), Gérard Badini (tenor sax), Claude Gousset or Nat Peck (trombone) and Peter Giger (drums). In 1963, he joined the group "The 4 Trombones Incorporated ", initiated by trombonist Raymond Fonsèque, with Charles Orieux, Michel Camicas, François Guin (trombones), Bernard Vitet (tp & flugelhorn), Jean-Louis Chautemps (saxophone) and Peter Giger (drums), who recorded four original compositions by Raymond Fonsèque (not commercially released). In 1968, he accompanied several trombonists (Raymond Fonsèque, François Guin, Luis Fuentes, Christian Guizien, Charles Rieux, Slide Hampton) at the Concert de Jazz au Studio 105 devoted to the trombone.

He also exercised his talents as a lyricist, as for Jack Ary and his High Society Cha Cha in 1959, with the title Mah Jong Cha Cha, or for Fernand Raynaud in 1965 (Cuisses de grenouille, co-written with Micheline Schotsmans). He also composed for singers such as Ricet Barrier (Le Noël du chasseur, 1968).

In 1963, at the Olympia, he met Jacques Martin, then a presenter, who was to become the star presenter from the 1970s to the 1990s. From then on, the two men became inseparable, collaborating on radio, television and at galas organized by Jacques Martin.

In 1979, for example, he was heard in the cellar of the Hot Club de France in a trio with pianist Didier Aubin and drummer Carl Régnier.

In the 1980s, Robert Quibel was arranger, conductor and composer of music and songs for animated TV series (Sport Billy, Heckle et Jeckle), as well as phonographic adaptations of Disney Studios animated shorts and features, in collaboration with Disques Adès. He is also arranger and conductor for several Jacques Martin records and for Francine Bell's album (1983).

Robert Quibel has collaborated with many famous artists, including crooner Paul Anka, singers Serge Reggiani, Catherine Sauvage and even Édith Piaf, with whom he had the honor of playing at her last concert at the Olympia.

In addition to numerous themes and theme music for Jacques Martin's television programs, Robert Quibel composed À la mémoire de Duke Ellington, a suite for brass quintet.

== Discography ==
As a musician:

- 1962: Claude Bolling Trio, Ragtime Bolling, 424292PE Philips
- 1962: Claude Bolling Sextet, Madison Twist, P77159L, Philips
- 1963: Claude Bolling Sextet, Bolling's Band's Blowing, Philips
- 1963: Claude Bolling Sextet, Madison, 424288 PE Philips
- 1968: Jacques Martin, Et voilà pourquoi je suis syndiquée, 71283 Barclay
- 1970: Jacques Martin, Jacques Martin à l'Olympia, BIEM 920251 Barclay
- 1971: Olga Forest, La révolte des arbres
- 1979: Bernadette Rollin, Le juste droit, song from the film

As arranger and conductor:

- 1983: Francine Bell, Francine Bell, Disques Adès
- 1983: Jacques Martin and Angelo, Angelo, Vogue
- 1984: Jacques Martin, Thé Dansant, Saban Records

As a lyricist:

- 1959: Jack Ary, Mah Jong Cha Cha Cha
- 1965: Fernand Raynaud, Les cuisses de grenouilles, Philips
- 1966: Rino Adipietro, Rome, je me souviens de toi, His Master's Voice
- 1966: The Bell Ringers/Marc Steckar, Mon amour de neige, Les amis, les copains, N'y pense pas, SFP
- 1967: Jacques Daloux, Pop'Art, Decca

== Composition ==
Music for the stage:

- 1978: Cyrano ou les Soleils de la Raison by Claude Bonnefoy, based on Cyrano de Bergerac, Théâtre national de Chaillot, Paris

Film music:

- 1973: Na_! by Jacques Martin, with Jacques Martin and Jean Baitzouroff

== Filmography ==
- 1973: Na ! by Jacques Martin
- 1992: Les Cinq Dernières Minutes
