= Benny Vasseur =

French jazz trombonist (1926–2015)

Bernard "Benny" Vasseur (March 7, 1926, Neuville-Saint-Rémy – February 6, 2015, Paris) was a French jazz trombonist.

Vasseur studied music at the Cambrai conservatory and the Paris Conservatory, playing trombone and piano in addition to singing. He played informally with the Hot Club de Versailles shortly after the end of World War II, then began working with Claude Bolling and Rex Stewart. In 1948 he began playing at the Club Saint-Germain in Paris and other jazz venues in the city, playing as a sideman for Sidney Bechet, Benny Carter, Buck Clayton, Bill Coleman, Roy Eldridge, Big Chief Russell Moore, Albert Nicholas, Hot Lips Page, and Django Reinhardt.

In the 1950s he worked in the bands of Aimé Barelli, Michel Attenoux, and Claude Luter, also working with Bechet again toward the end of the decade. In 1957 he formed a duo with fellow trombonist André Paquinet, and worked with Annie Cordy in 1960. In the 1960s he did work as a session musician in studio orchestras, playing on records by Tony Bennett, Sammy Davis Jr., Liza Minnelli, and Frank Sinatra, and in 1965 he played in François Guin's group alongside François Biensan. Late in the 1960s he returned to playing with Claude Bolling, an association which would last several decades.

== Sources ==
- André Clergeat, "Benny Vasseur". The New Grove Dictionary of Jazz. 2nd edition, ed. Barry Kernfeld.
