= Claude Abadie =

French clarinetist (1920-2020)

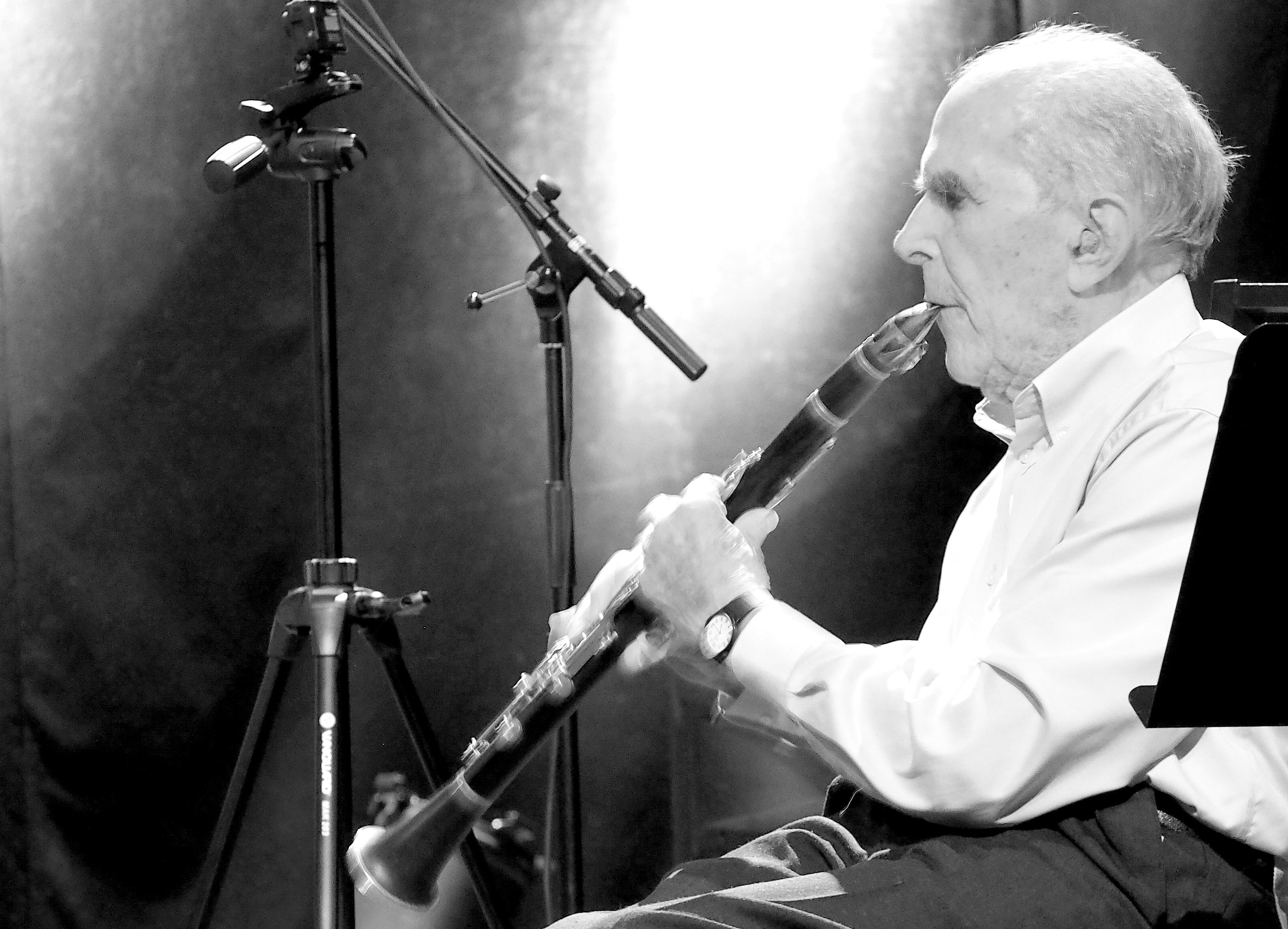

Background information
- Born: 16 January 1920; Paris, France
- Died: 29 March 2020 (aged 100)
- Instrument: Clarinet

Claude Abadie (16 January 1920 – 29 March 2020) was a French jazz clarinetist and bandleader.

Abadie was born in January 1920 in Paris. He was interested in New Orleans jazz and Chicago jazz from an early age, and formed his own ensemble in 1941 to play in a Dixieland-revival style; Boris Vian played in the group from 1943. Soon after, his ensemble included Claude Luter, Jef Gilson, Raymond Fol, and Hubert Fol. He founded a new ensemble in 1949, which included Jean-Claude Fohrenbach and Benny Vasseur, but quit music in 1952, not returning to performance until 1963. In 1965, he formed a large ensemble to play contemporary jazz.

He turned 100 in January 2020 and died two months later.

== Sources ==
- Michel Laplace, "Claude Abadie". The New Grove Dictionary of Jazz. 2nd edition, ed. Barry Kernfeld.
