= Jean-Claude Naude =

French jazz pianist and trumpeter

Jean-Claude Naude (March 7, 1933, Amiens -January 9, 2008) was a French jazz pianist and trumpeter.

Naude attended the Amiens conservatory and played early in his career as a trumpeter for Raymond Fonsèque's orchestra and with Georges Arvanitas. In 1955, he began working with Maxim Saury, an association that would last a decade. He also played piano with Raymond Fonsèque in a trio with trombonist Luis Fuentes. He led his own big bands in the second half of the 1960s, and played with Gerard Badini, Jacky Samson, and Andre Paquinet. In the 1970s he worked with Claude Bolling and in the 1980s with Bob Quibel.
