= Pierre Christophe (musician) =

French jazz pianist (b. 1969)

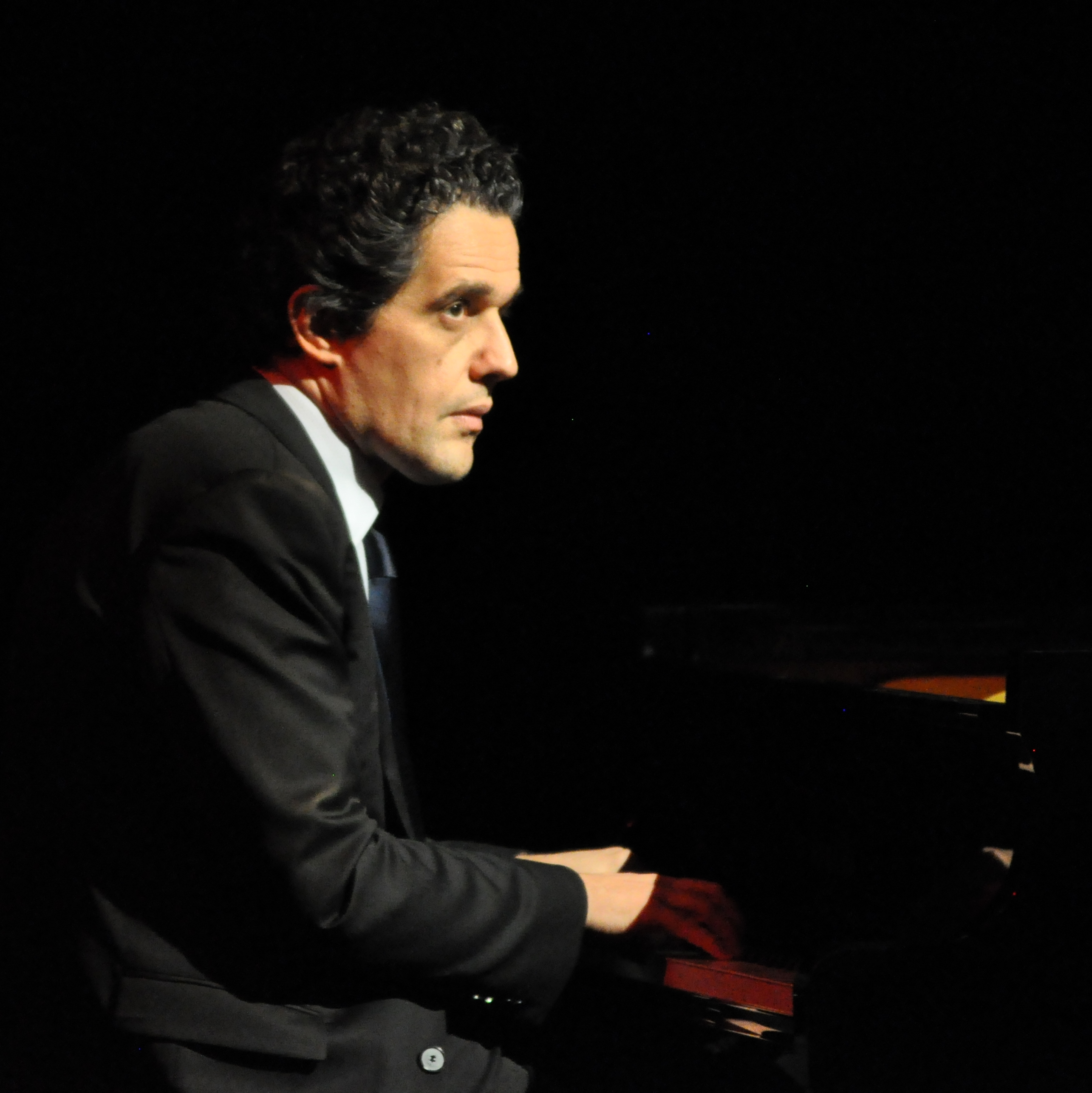
- Pierre Christophe in 2016

Background information
- Born: June 29, 1969 (age 56); Bourges, France
- Genres: Jazz
- Instrument: Piano
- Years active: 1990–present
- Labels: Black & Blue Records, Nocturne, jazz&people, Camille Productions

Pierre Christophe (born 29 June 1969 in Bourges) is a French jazz pianist.

== Biography ==
Pierre Christophe studied both classical and jazz piano at Marseille Regional Conservatory in the class of Guy Longnon, and in 1991 he passed his gold medal exam. Having been awarded a scholarship from the French Ministry of Culture, he became a student of Jaki Byard at the Manhattan School of Music in New York City from 1991 to 1995, where he obtained a Bachelor of Music. He would eventually release four discs dedicated to the work of Jaki Byard, and his 2024 album Passing By includes a song titled I Remember Jaki.

He has worked with many musicians, including James Spaulding, Frank Morgan, Butch Warren, Lew Tabackin, Ricky Ford, Pete Christlieb, Ulf Wakenius, Gérard Badini, Géraldine Laurent, and Vincent Courtois.

In 2007, he was awarded the Django-Reinhardt prize for best French jazz musician of the year.

In 2021, he released Flowing, an album in collaboration with the guitarist Hugo Lippi.

In 2024, he released Passing By, his 12th album, with Hugo Lippi and the string quartet Quatuor Hanson.

== Discography ==
=== Leader ===
- 1995: Reflets dans l'Hudson (Nocturne)
- 2002: Byard by Us (Black & Blue Records)
- 2004: Byard by Us Vol.2 (Black & Blue)
- 2006: Byard…& More (Black & Blue)
- 2007: Byard By Us LIVE ! (Black & Blue)
- 2009: Frozen Tears (Black & Blue)
- 2013: Tribute To Erroll Garner (Camille Productions)
- 2014: Valparaiso (Black & Blue)
- 2016: At Barloyd's (jazz&people)
- 2018: Live at Smalls - with Joel Frahm & Joe Martin (Camille Productions)
- 2021: Flowing - with Hugo Lippi (Camille Productions)
- 2024: Passing By - with Hugo Lippi & Quatuor Hanson (Camille Productions)

=== Sideman ===
- Walter Ricci / David Sauzay – Nice and Easy (Jazz Time Prod / 2014)
- Laurent Mignard Duke Orchestra + Michel Pastre Big Band – Battle Royal (Juste une Trace / 2011)
- Patricia Bonner – What is there to say ? (Terranga Prod / 2011)
- Jérôme Etcheberry – Ecce Berry (L'Olifant / 2010)
- Butch Warren – French 5tet (Black & Blue Records / 2010)
- Philippe Pilon – Take it Easy (Black & Blue / 2010)
- Michel Pastre Big Band – To Prez and Count (Jazz aux Remparts / 2009)
- Barend Middelhoff – Lucky Man (Aphrodite Records / 2009)
- Stan Laferriere – To My Guitar Heroes (Black & Blue / 2008)
- Jean-Michel Proust – Until It's Time For You To Go (Cristal Records / 2007)
- James Spaulding – Down with it (Futura Marge / 2006)
- Mourad Benhammou & Jazzworkers Quintet – Perk's Snare (Black & Blue / 2006)
- Gérard Badini – Scriabin's Groove (Super Bad Trax / 2005)
- Michel Pastre – Free Swing (Djaz Records / 2004)
- David Sauzay – Three in One (Black & Blue / 2004)
- Gérard Badini – French Cooking (Nocturne / 2002)
- Michel Pastre – Jumping with César (Djaz Records / 2002)
- Benjamin Herman trio featuring Pierre Christophe – Plays Jaki Byard (A Records / 2001)
- Xavier Richardeau – Hit and Run (Taxi Records / 2001)
- Vincent Courtois – Pleine Lune (Nocturne / 1991)
- Vincent Courtois – Cello News (Nocturne / 1990)
- 133 violoncelles pour Pablo Casals (Vogue / 1990)
