= André Paquinet =

French jazz trombonist

André Paquinet (October 1, 1926, Arcueil - July 5, 2014) was a French jazz trombonist.

Paquinet's father was Guy Paquinet, and early in his life André played in his father's ensemble. He then worked with Tony Proteau, Jacques Hélian, Claude Bolling, Michel Legrand, and Fred Gerard in the 1950s. In 1957, he founded a trombone duo with Benny Vasseur; they recorded and worked together throughout the 1960s. He also worked extensively as a sideman in the 1960s, for Dany Doriz, André Hodeir, and François Guin. In 1967 he worked with Jean-Claude Naude for the first time, returning again to collaborate several times in the early 1970s. Around 1970 he played with Roy Eldridge, Slide Hampton, and Ivan Jullien; from 1973 to 1977 he was in Berlin, working with Paul Kuntz.
