= Jacky Samson =

French jazz double-bassist

- Born: April 11, 1943; Paris, France
- Died: October 3, 2012 (aged 69); Précy-sous-Thil, Côte-d'Or, France
- Occupation: jazz double-bassist

Jacky Samson (April 11, 1943 – October 3, 2012) was a French jazz double-bassist.

== Career ==
Samson studied bass in Versailles. He was the bassist in Georges Arvanitas's trio for nearly thirty years starting in 1965, playing with Dexter Gordon, Hank Mobley, and Albert Nicholas, among others. Outside of this association, he also performed or recorded in the 1960s and 1970s with François Biensan, Milt Buckner, Jimmy Dawkins, Maynard Ferguson, François Guin, Slide Hampton, Michel Hausser, Guy Lafitte, and Jean-Claude Naude. Later in his career, he became a professor in Orly.

== Death ==
He died on October 3, 2012, in Précy-sous-Thil, Côte-d'Or, France.
