= Michel Hausser =

French jazz vibraphonist (1927–2024)

Michel Hausser (7 February 1927 – 25 January 2024) was a French jazz vibraphonist.

== Biography ==
Hausser was born in Colmar on 7 February 1927. He played accordion as a child and taught the instrument in his early twenties before switching to vibraphone in 1948. Initially, he studied the instrument classically, but by the mid-1950s was working as a sideman, playing during that decade for Eddy Barclay, Christian Chevallier, Henri Crolla, Benny Golson, Stephane Grappelli, Roger Guérin, Bobby Jaspar, Lucky Thompson, and Sarah Vaughan. In 1964 he formed his own trio ensemble with bassist Jacky Samson; his drummers for this venture included Jean Guérin, Franco Manzecchi, and Teddy Martin. Later in the 1960s he worked with Georges Arvanitas and Johnny Griffin. In the 1970s he moved back to Alsace (eastern France), where he became a professor in Munster, Haut-Rhin. Hausser died on 25 January 2024, at the age of 96.

== Sources ==
- Michel Laplace, "Michel Hausser". The New Grove Dictionary of Jazz, 2nd edition, ed. Barry Kernfeld.
