= Guy Longnon =

Guy Longnon (July 16, 1924 – February 1, 2014) was a French jazz trumpeter, arranger and music pedagogue active in the jazz scene of Marseille.

== Life and career ==
Guy Longnon was born in Paris, France on July 16, 1924. He played with Raymond Fol, Don Byas, Sidney Bechet, Mezz Mezzrow, Russell Moore, Claude Luter, Jean-Claude Fohrenbach, Guy Lafitte, André Persiany, Albert Nicholas, Gérard Pochonet, and Moustache from the beginning of the 1950s. In the field of jazz, he was involved in sixty recording sessions between 1950 and 1958; he also performed in the orchestras of Michel Attenoux and André Réwéliotty, and in Paris with Boris Vian. In this time he also wrote film music for the short films Terreur en Oklahoma (1951) and Chicago Digest (1952).

Longnon created a jazz class on the initiative of Pierre Barbizet at the Conservatoire National à Rayonnement Regional (CNRR) in Marseille in 1963. Among his pupils were Pierre Christophe, André Jaume, Bruno Angelini, Gérald Bataille, Caparros Jose, Gérard Sumian, Justice Olsson and Jean-Marc Padovani. Philippe Renault, who succeeded Guy Longnon at CNRR in Marseille in 1992, founded the jazz group D6, which recorded a tribute album in honor of Longnon in 2013, Kind of Guy.

Guy Longnon is the uncle of Jean-Loup Longnon.
