= Jimmy Shirley =

American jazz and R&B guitarist

- Jimmy Shirley (album cover of China Boy, 1975)

Background information
- Born: May 31, 1913; Union, South Carolina, U.S.
- Died: December 3, 1989 (aged 76); New York City
- Genres: Jazz, blues, jump blues, rock
- Occupation: Musician
- Instrument: Guitar
- Years active: 1930s–1970s
- Labels: Blue Note, Black and Blue

Jimmy Shirley (May 31, 1913 – December 3, 1989) was an American jazz and R&B guitarist who recorded from the 1940s to the 1970s. He was an early exponent of the electric guitar and was one of the first to use the Vibrola vibrato arm in recordings, such as on "Jimmy’s Blues" (1945).

== Career ==
While growing up in Cleveland, he was taught guitar by his father. In 1937, he moved to New York City and spent four years with the Clarence Profit Trio. In 1940, he recorded with Wingy Carpenter. He worked with Ella Fitzgerald from 1942 to 1943 and with Phil Moore and Herman Chittison. During the 1940s, he recorded with Clyde Bernhardt, Sid Catlett, Sidney De Paris, Edmond Hall, John Hardee, Coleman Hawkins, Art Hodes, Billie Holiday, James P. Johnson, Pete Johnson, Billy Kyle, and Ram Ramirez.

Beginning in the 1950s, Shirley played less swing guitar, more blues, jump blues, and rock and roll. He recorded or accompanied singers Wynonie Harris, Jimmy Rushing, Screamin' Jay Hawkins, Little Willie John, Rose Murphy and Barbara Lea. He performed in Europe during the 1970s, recorded the album Steff and Slam with Stéphane Grappelli and Slam Stewart, and China Boy (Black and Blue, 1975), his only album as a leader.
