= Claude Guilhot =

French jazz vibraphonist and drummer

Claude Guilhot (September 2, 1929 - December 15, 1990) was a French jazz vibraphonist and drummer.

Guilhot was born in Toulouse to a family of music pedagogues. Initially a professional drummer, he worked with Charles Barrié, Jacques Gauthé, and Mezz Mezzrow before switching to vibraphone late in the 1950s. He and saxophonist Michel Roques shared leadership of an ensemble which included appearances from Don Byas, Buck Clayton, Bill Coleman, Sonny Grey, and Lucky Thompson. In 1962 he relocated to Paris, where he played with Kenny Clarke, Alix Combelle, Champion Jack Dupree, Pierre Dutour, Jimmy Gourley, Henri Renaud, and Hal Singer.

In 1970 he taught music in St. Germain-en-Laye, and in the 1980s worked with Georges Arvanitas and in his own ensemble with Sylvain Beuf and Stéphane Belmondo as sidemen.
