= Otisto 23 =

French musician and producer

Dominique Poutet
- Also known as: Otisto 23
- Born: September 24, 1974 (age 51)
- Occupation: Musician

Otisto 23 (born 24 September 1974 at Cannes), is the pseudonym of Dominique Poutet, a French musician and producer.

== Biography ==
Pianist with a classical background, Dominique Poutet is the co-founder, producer and sound engineer of both labels DTC Records and Breakz.

His experience of electro-instrumental fusion gives him today the opportunity to participate to many projects of records and live shows in France (Laurent de Wilde, Mekanik Kantatik, Sam Karpienia...) and abroad (Ti'Fock, Arambol Experience, Hos Hayas).

Dominique Poutet is also a M.A.O instructor certified by Ableton. He led many training courses and master classes for professional of the entertainment business in France and abroad.

Besides his production activity, he develops his musical career. He plays solo live under the name of Otisto 23.

In the other hand, since 2006, he performs in duo with the pianist Laurent de Wilde with whom he composed three records.

== Awards and honors ==
Record of the year Jazz Magazine for the album Over the Clouds with Laurent de Wilde (2012)

== Discography ==
- 2014 : Fly Superfly (Laurent de Wilde vs Otisto 23)
- 2010 : Fly! (Laurent de Wilde vs Otisto 23)
- 2007: PC Pieces (Laurent de Wilde vs Otisto 23)

=== Productions and producer ===
- 2015: Synthesis (Gaël Horellou)
- 2014: Disconnected EP (Manu Ferrantini)
- 2014: Open Me (Guillaume Perret & The Electric Epic)
- 2014: Loan in Space Time (Loan featuring Juice Aleem, The Space Ape, Bang on and Antipop Consortium)
- 2014: Aquatik Baby (Dandy Freaks)
- 2014: Movie'zz (Laurent Robin & The Skyriders)
- 2014: Legacy (Gaël Horellou feat. Abraham Burton)
- 2013: China Expedisound (Remix Contest)
- 2013: 12 secrets of a lady (Sophie Darly)
- 2012: Over the clouds (Laurent de Wilde trio)
- 2012: Drop circles E.P. (Loan)
- 2011: Gayar Natir Tour (Ti Fock)
- 2011: Red Nails (Red Rails)
- 2011: Album 1 (Under Kontro])
- 2011: Remix (Grigri Breakers)
- 2010: Electric Epic (Guillaume Perret & The Electric Epic)
- 2009: Grigri Breakers
- 2006 to 2008:

Production and producer of: Nicolas Cante Piano Mekanik Kantatik, Sam Karpienia trio (l'Autre distribution), Loan (DTC records/IOT Records), Abraxxxas (IOT Records). Production of PC Pieces and double remixes album (Nocturne/DTC records) in duo (Laurent de Wilde vs Otisto23). TV jingles Champions League (L'Équipe 21). Composition of the soundtrack for sports TV production Paris Dakar. Live performance in France and internationally (festivals and artistic exchange with Mongolia, China, India and Mexico).

- 2006 to 2007:

Production of the third album for Arambol Production. Many productions as sound engineer and producer: Cosmik Connection "grand panache", Laurent de Wilde Trio et NHX II.

- 2003 to 2005:

Production of two albums for Arambol Production in Goa (India) and Paris.

Studio production (Sound recording, Mixing, Mastering) and tour with Laurent de Wilde & Gaël Horellou on Organics. Tour in France, Brazil, Canada, Spain, United Kingdom.

- 1998:

Working composition for the video game industry in Paris, Museum of Natural History, and EMME Interactive.

Recording and mixing the album of Anne Ducros / Produced in collaboration with Didier Lockwood.

== Trainer and Speaker in MAO ==
- 2013 to 2014:

Creation of three years training courses to the Music Profession, Cours Florent « Florent Musique », various Master class in India, French institute and French alliance, Conservatory of St Denis at la Réunion, Trempolino at Nantes and Sciences Po Paris.

Conference on « Digital and Imaginary » with Aurélie Filippetti, technical advisor on writing for the book of Laurent de Wilde Les fous du son (publishing Grasset).

Artistic audit for several music bands (Kabbalah, Glück, Géraud Portal Quintet)

« Beta Tester » and « Product Owner » for the software company MAO Ableton « Live », first French « Certified Trainer » at Ableton « Live ».

- 2005 to 2013:

Main instructor for "masterclass" on Ableton Live, Paris, Ircam, Marseille, Rennes, Lille, Lyon, Pekin, La Réunion. Applied research for synchronisation of music, video and movement. Producer trainer for the organism.

- 1999 to 2002:

Creation and setup of the MAO training courses at CIFAP Montreuil MAO Trainer. Demonstrator for Steinberg, Magix, Sonic Foundry, Emagic, Ableton, Sonic Solution, Digidesign, MOTU. Speaker in others multimedia and video editing courses.
