= Claude Tissendier =

French jazz reedist and bandleader (born 1952)

Claude Tissendier (born 1 October 1952) is a French jazz reedist and bandleader.

He was born in Toulouse, France.

Tissendier studied classical music as well as jazz, and began playing in Paris in 1977 with Claude Bolling, Ornicar, Gérard Badini, Jean-Loup Longnon, and François Laudet. He founded an ensemble in tribute to John Kirby in 1983, then formed Saxomania, a seven-piece band which played with Benny Carter, Guy Lafitte, Spike Robinson, Clark Terry, and Phil Woods.

== Bibliography ==
- André Clergeat, "Claude Tissendier". The New Grove Dictionary of Jazz. Second edition, ed. Barry Kernfeld.
