= Azzi =

Azzi may refer to:

== People ==
=== Surname ===
- Arnaldo Azzi (1885–1957), Italian general and politician
- Ayoub Azzi (born 1989), Algerian footballer
- Canaan Azzi (born 1993), Lebanese-American inventor, industrialist and philanthropist
- Christian Azzi (1926–2020), French jazz pianist
- David Azzi (born 1981), Lebanese-Canadian football player
- Franklin Azzi (born 1975), French architect
- Georges Azzi (born 1979), Lebanese gay activist
- Jennifer Azzi (born 1968), American women's basketball coach
- Nadia Azzi (born 1998), American pianist of Lebanese-Japanese origin
- Paulo Azzi (born 1994), Brazilian professional footballer
- Steve Azzi, Lebanese rugby league player
- Angelo Azzi (born 1939), Swiss-Italian, scientist

=== Given name ===
- Azzi Fudd (born 2002), American basketball player
- Azzi Glasser (born 1970), British perfume designer

== Other uses ==
- Azzi, a kingdom of the Hayasa-Azzi confederation in the Late Bronze Age

== See also ==
- Andrew Kazzi, Australian international rugby league footballer of Lebanese descent
- Basil Alkazzi (born 1938), Kuwaiti-born British painter
