= Claude Barthélemy =

Claude Barthélemy may refer to:

- Claude Barthélemy (footballer)
- Claude Barthélemy (musician)
