= Michel Denis =

French jazz and blues drummer

Michel Denis (born May 1, 1941, Boulogne-Billancourt) is a French jazz and blues drummer.

Denis played early in his career with the Roman Dixieland Jazz Band, and worked extensively with dixieland and swing musicians such as Don Byas, Dominique Chanson, Bill Coleman, Michel De Villers, Earl Hines, Stuff Smith, and Rex Stewart. After Memphis Slim moved to Paris, Denis joined his band, working with him for eighteen years; concurrently, he also played as a sideman for Paul Gonsalves, Johnny Griffin, Claude Guilhot, John Lee Hooker, Michel Sardaby, T-Bone Walker, and Big Joe Williams. In the 1970s he played with Dany Doriz extensively. In 1981 he joined François Rilhac's Harlem Jazz ensemble, and later worked with Peter Compo and Philippe Milanta, the latter accompanying Spanky Wilson.
