= Hubert Fol =

French jazz saxophonist and bandleader

Hubert Fol (November 11, 1925, Paris – January 19, 1995, Paris) was a French jazz saxophonist and bandleader.

Fol was Raymond Fol's brother, and learned piano from an early age through lessons from his mother. He also took lessons in violin and clarinet in his teens and early twenties. As a saxophonist, he worked with Claude Abadie and Boris Vian and co-founded the "Be Bop Minstrels" with his brother in 1947. The group's first visit to the studios took place on 4 July; the session resulted in the first bebop sides recorded in France. He became one of the most capable French bebop players, and such visiting musicians as Coleman Hawkins, Don Byas and Dizzy himself, in addition to Rex Stewart, John Lewis, Kenny Clarke, James Moody, and Jimmy Raney, enjoyed playing with him.

In 1949–50, he toured Europe and recorded with Coleman Hawkins, then worked with Kenny Clarke and Django Reinhardt before embarking on another European tour with Dizzy Gillespie and Rex Stewart. However, his health deteriorated in the 1960s, which led to his playing far less frequently.

== Sources ==
- André Clergeat and Barry Kernfeld, "Hubert Fol". The New Grove Dictionary of Jazz. 2nd edition, 2001.
