= Fohrenbach =

Fohrenbach or Föhrenbach is a surname. Notable people with the surname include:

- Jean-Claude Fohrenbach (1925–2009), French jazz saxophonist
- Jonas Föhrenbach (born 1996), German footballer
