= Raymond Fol =

French jazz pianist (1928–1979)

Raymond Fol (April 28, 1928, in Paris – May 1, 1979, in Paris) was a French jazz pianist.

Fol's older brother was Hubert Fol, and both were raised in a musical household; Raymond began playing piano at five years of age. Fol and his brother played in Claude Abadie's ensemble after the end of World War II, a group which included Boris Vian. The Fol brothers then formed their own group, the Be Bop Minstrels. Raymond worked around with this time with musicians such as Pierre Braslavsky, Jean-Claude Fohrenbach, Django Reinhardt, Roy Eldridge, and Johnny Hodges. In 1952, he did a European tour in Dizzy Gillespie's band, and for several years in the middle of the decade was a regular at Paris's Club Saint-Germain. He also worked in the 1950s with Sidney Bechet, Claude Luter, Guy Lafitte, and Stephane Grappelli. He worked briefly in Rome in 1958, then returned to Paris, playing both piano and celesta at the Club Saint-Germain. In the 1960s and 1970s, he worked with Kenny Clarke, Duke Ellington, Paul Gonsalves, Cat Anderson, and Gerard Badini; he also recorded a few times on solo piano in the first half of the 1970s.
