= Raymond Fonsèque =

French jazz trombonist, tubist, and arranger (1930–2011)

Raymond Fonsèque (born November 27, 1930, Paris – November 19, 2011) was a French jazz trombonist and tubaist.

Fonsèque studied cello and piano formally, then switched to trombone at age 17 under André Hodeir. In the 1950s and 1960s he performed widely with early jazz and blues musicians, including Lil Armstrong, Sidney Bechet, Big Bill Broonzy, Don Byas, Peanuts Holland, and Nelson Williams. He also played with French bandleaders such as Michel Attenoux, Claude Bolling, Jacques Hélian, and Claude Luter, and worked in contemporary idioms with Jacques Denjean, Raymond LeSénéchal, Bobby Jaspar, and Tony Proteau. Later in his career he played with Cat Anderson, Bill Coleman, Wallace Davenport, and François Guin.

Fonsèque advocated for a double equal temperament called super temperament with 24 notes per octave, allowing to play thirds according to just intonation.
