= Longnon =

Longnon is a last name. Notable people with this last name include:

- Auguste Longnon (1844–1911), French historian and archivist
- Guy Longnon (1924–2014), French jazz musician, uncle of Jean-Loup
- Jean-Loup Longnon (born 1953), French jazz musician, nephew of Guy
