= Jacques Gauthé =

French jazz musician

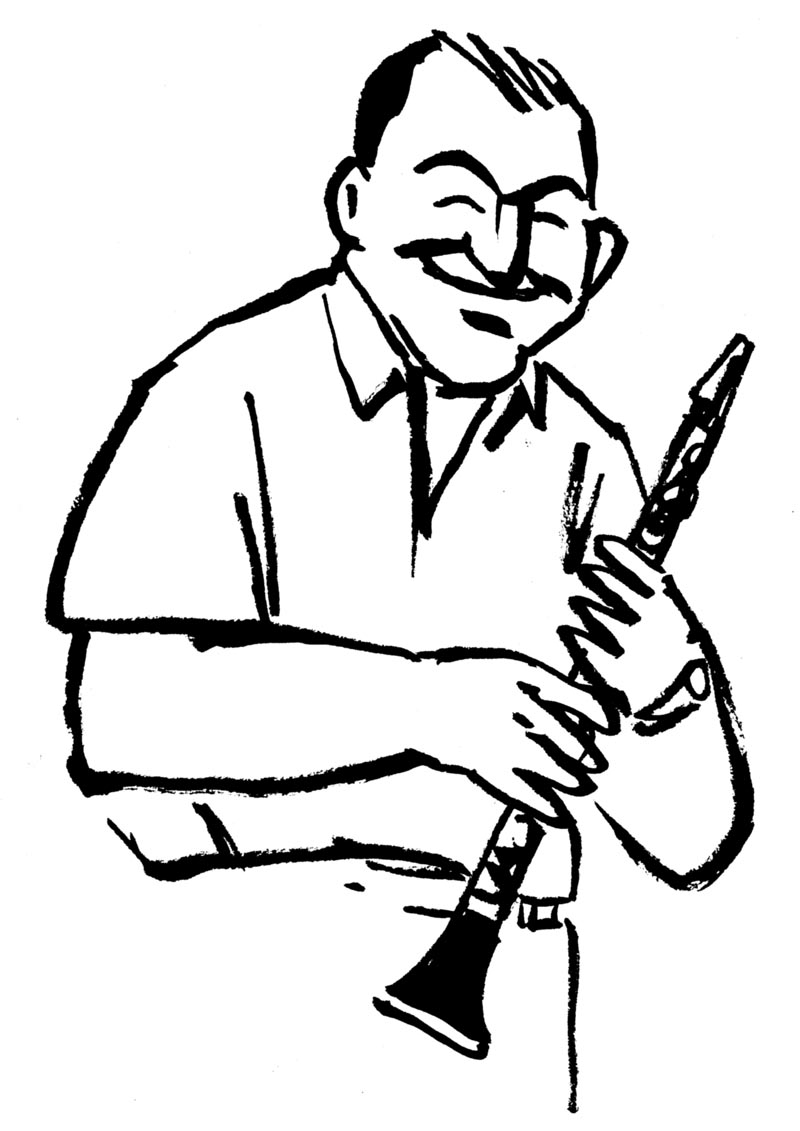
Jacques Gauthé

Jacques Gauthé (12 June 1939, Gaujac - 10 June 2007, Gaujac) was a French jazz reedist.

Gauthé studied under Claude Luter and Sidney Bechet as a teenager, and formed his own band in 1957, which played alongside Don Byas, Mezz Mezzrow, Albert Nicholas, Lucky Thompson, and Benny Waters. In the 1960s he formed a new ensemble, the Old Time Jazz Band, which included Enzo Mucci and Claude Tissendier as sidemen. In 1972, he relocated to New Orleans, where he played at Preservation Hall and worked with Alvin Alcorn, Wallace Davenport, Freddie Kohlman, Freddy Lonzo, Louis Nelson, Steve Pistorius, and Teddy Riley.
