= Raymond Guiot =

French flautist and composer (1930–2025)

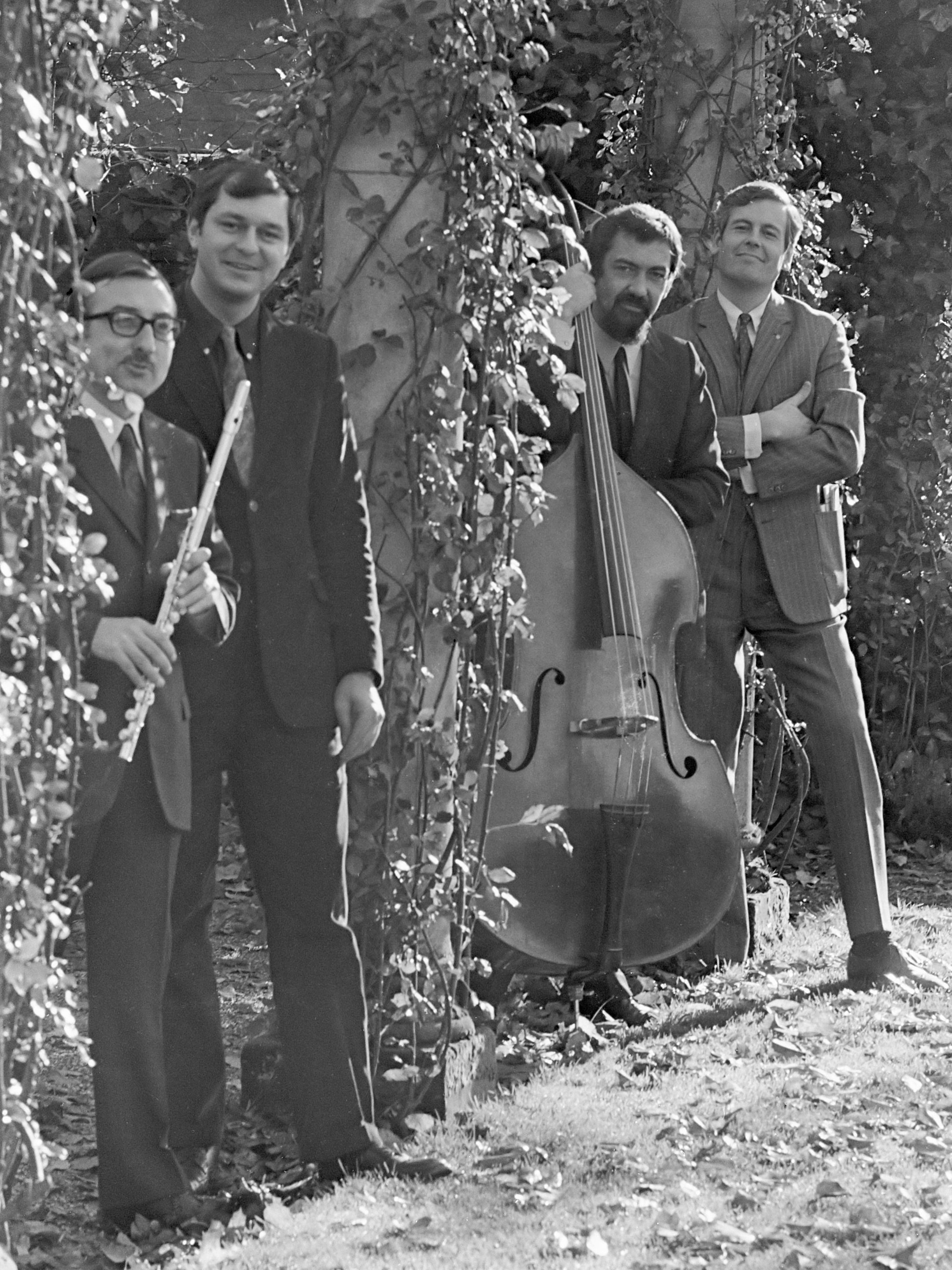
- Raymond Guiot (far left) with his quartet, 1967
- Born: 5 October 1930; Roubaix, France
- Died: 11 July 2025 (aged 94)
- Occupations: Flautist; Composer; Academic teacher
- Organizations: Opéra de Paris; Conservatoire de Paris

Raymond Guiot (French: [ʁɛmɔ̃ ɡɥijo]; 5 October 1930 – 11 July 2025) was a French flautist and composer. He was known for both classical music and jazz, as principal flute at the Opéra de Paris from 1962 to 1991 and an influential teacher at the Conservatoire de Paris from 1977, but was influenced in his compositions also by jazz and popular music. He recorded in many genres, also adapting classical compositions in jazz.

== Life and career ==
Guiot was born in Roubaix on 5 October 1930, to Georges and Alphonsine Guiot. His father was a sports teacher interested in music. He grew up with an older brother. He entered the conservatoire of his hometown aged 7. His first teacher in solfège, Fernand Dusausoy, also taught flute and won him for that instrument although he had preferred trumpet.

Guiot moved on to the Conservatoire de Paris at age 14, where he studied for two years in Marcel Moyse's class. Moyse shaped his technique and also his integrity and attitude to work. Guiot achieved the first prize at the conservatoire in 1947. A few months later, he joined the Opéra de Lille as piccolo, playing with musical directors Fernand Oubradous and Georges Prêtre. He learned his trade there over three years, performing many operas, operettas and lyrical comedies.

Guiot then taught flute at the École nationale de musique de Calais from 1950 to 1956. During this time he prepared – alone – the Geneva International Music Competition, of which he won the first prize in 1954.

In 1956, the French Republican Guard Band of Paris gave Guiot the opportunity to leave Calais. He then started to work a lot for the Parisian recording studios, often participating in three daily recording sessions. In many of the recordings from the 1960s and 1970s, the musicians were not credited. He played in a jazz quartet with drummer Daniel Humair, bassist Guy Pedersen and pianist George Gruntz, and also collaborated with violinist André Hodeir, clarinetist Maxim Saury, and guitarists Baden Powell, Elek Bacsik and Claude Ciari.

Guiot became principal flute at the Opéra de Paris in 1962, holding the post until 1991. He also became assistant to Alain Marion at the Conservatoire de Paris in 1977, teaching to a generation of flautists both "rigorous technique and stylistic freedom".

=== Personal life ===
Guiot married the sister of his jazz quartet partner Guy Pedersen. He died on 11 July 2025, aged 94.

== Compositions ==
Guiot compositions are based on classical forms and borrow elements from jazz and popular music. They have been described as charming, clear and with rhythmic vitality.

== Discography ==
=== Albums ===
Guiot made albums for Tele Music (TM), a label focused on music for visual presentations.

==== Jazz based on classical compositions ====
- 1965: Raymond Guiot – Bach Street
- 1965: Raymond Guiot – Haendel with care
- 1966: Raymond Guiot and his orchestra – Boum Bomo
- 1968: Raymond Guiot – Scarlatti Sounds, TM 3000
- 1970: Raymond Guiot – Jazz Baroque Quintet, TM 3003
- 1971: Raymond Guiot plays Domenico Scarlatti
- 1972: Raymond Guiot – Néo-Classiques, TM 3025
- 1973: Raymond Guiot – Jazz Panorama, TM 3031
- 1974: Raymond Guiot – Instruments à vents, vol. 2, TM 3036
- 1974: Raymond Guiot – Flûtes & Harpes, TM 3039
- 1975: Raymond Guiot – Indicatifs, TM 3042
- 1975: Raymond Guiot – Flûtes & Guitares, TM 3054
- 1976: Raymond Guiot – Basse contre Basse, TM 3059
- 1978: Raymond Guiot – Baronne baroque
- 197?: Raymond Guiot – I like Johann Sebastien
- 1983: Raymond Guiot – Néo-Classiques, vol. 2, TM 3088
- 1985: Raymond Guiot – Air Generation, TM 3101

==== With Guy Pedersen ====
- 1970: Raymond Guiot & Guy Pedersen – Indian pop bass, TM 709
- 1970: Raymond Guiot & Guy Pedersen – Contrebasses, TM 3014
- 1971: Raymond Guiot & Guy Pedersen – Musique en Vrac, TM 3017

==== With others ====
- 1970: Raymond Guiot & Maurice Plessac – Flute & Hapsichord, TM 3011
- 1971: Raymond Guiot & R. Auteloup – Instruments à vent, vol.1, TM 3020
- 1973: Raymond Guiot & Pierre Bachelet – Pianos romantiques, TM 3024
- 1988: Raymond Guiot & Alain Marion – Golden Flute Club

==== As sideman ====
- 1957: Quand je monte chez to
- 1960: André Hodeir – Jazz & Jazz
- 1969: Le Monde Musical de Baden Powell, volume 2
- 1970: Claude Ciari and The Batucada Seven
- 1977: Baden Powell Canta Vinicus de Moraes e Paolo Cesar Pinheiro
- 1983: April Orchestra – Duty Free
- 1984: April Orchestra – Mélodies de Cour

=== In original film scores ===
Guiot participated as a musician, not composing the music, in films including:

- 1957: La Parisienne, film by Michel Boisrond, music by Henri Crolla, Hubert Rostaing and André Hodeir
- 1959: J'irai cracher sur vos tombes (film), film by Michel Gast, music by Alain Goraguer
- 1959: Les Loups dans la bergerie, film by Hervé Bromberger
- 1961: Saint-Tropez Blues, film by Marcel Moussy , music by Crolla and Hodeir
- 1967: Le Samouraï, film by Jean-Pierre Melville
- 1968: Alexandre Le Bienheureux, film by Yves Robert, music by Vladimir Cosma
- 1969: Clérambard, film by Robert, music by Vladimir Cosma
- 1970: Le Cercle rouge, film by Melville, music by Eric Demarsan

=== Compositions ===
- Sandrine François – Bluesy Prelude, Hybrid Music 2008
- Flautissimo vol. 29, Hommage à Raymond Guiot
