= Jean-Marc Padovani =

French jazz saxophonist, composer, and arranger

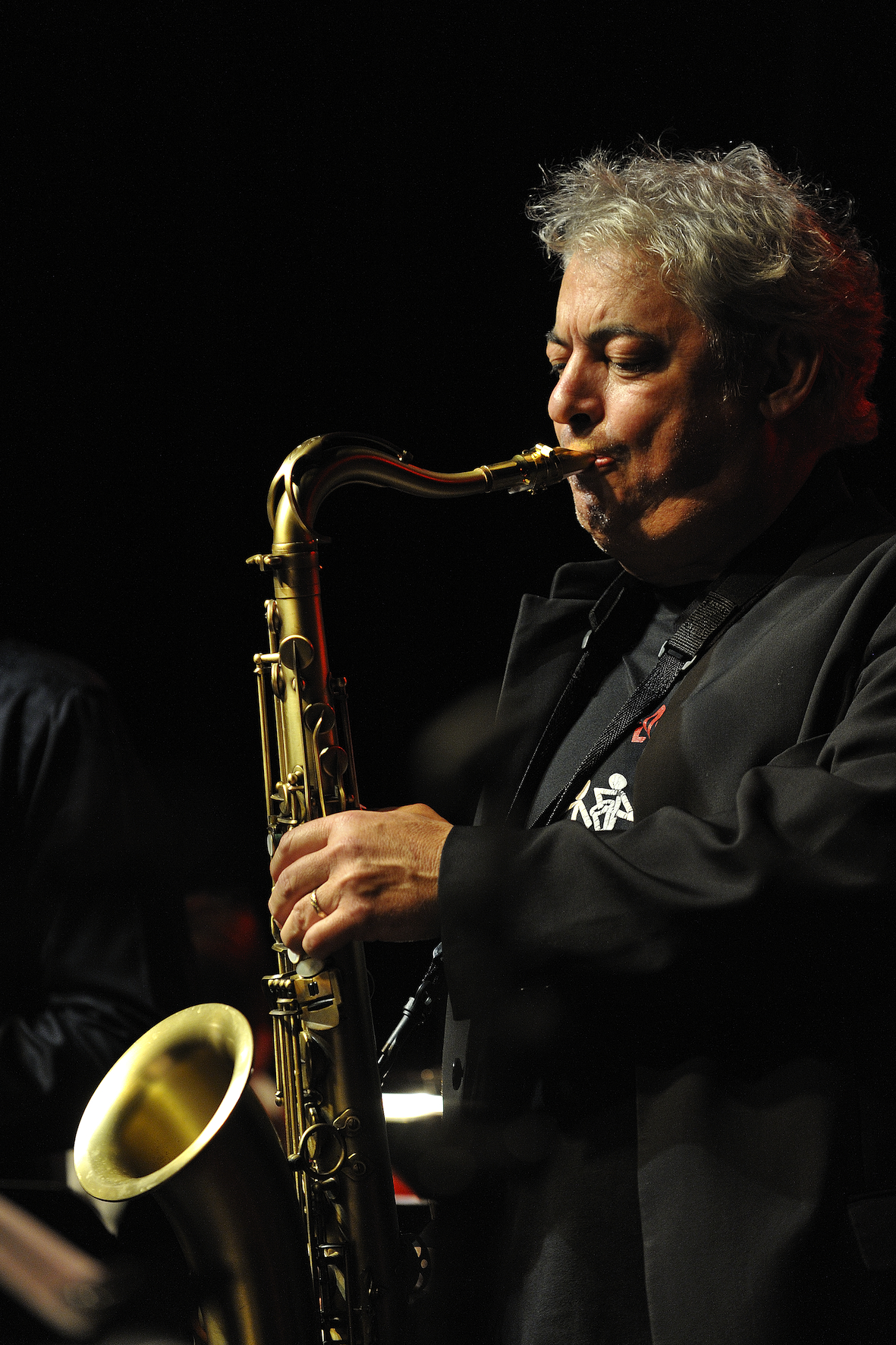
Padovani in 2010

Jean-Marc Padovani (born February 2, 1956) is a French jazz saxophonist, composer, and arranger.

== Career ==
Born in 1956 in Villeneuve-lès-Avignon, Padovani now lives in Toulouse. After studying classical music he enrolled in the jazz class of Guy Longnon at the Marseille Conservatory. Since 1975 he has participated in several regional jazz ensembles: orchestre du Jazz-Club de Nîmes, pianist Christian Lavigne's quartet, and Michel Marre's Cossi Anatz group of twelve musicians fusing jazz, Occitan, and African music.

Jean-Marc Padovani has worked in theatre, cinema, and song. He has worked with André Jaume, Jean-Louis Chautemps, Claude Barthélemy, Michel Marre, Louis Sclavis, Michel Godard, Bobby Rangell, Mal Waldron, Bennie Wallace, Enrico Rava, Gérard Marais, David Liebman, Jean-Marie Machado, Jean-François Jenny-Clark, and Paul Motian, with whom he recorded the 1996 album Takiya! Tokaya!.

He enjoyed his first big public success with Tres horas de sol, a musical and literary show of flamenco-jazz that he toured all over France and abroad for three years. His album Nimeño, recorded by a septet including Enrico Rava, was awarded Best Jazz Record of 1991 by the newspaper Libération. For many years he collaborated with the writer and actor Enzo Cormann, with whom he has created many musical theatre shows as part of their collaboration La Grande Ritournelle including: Mingus, Cuernavaca, Sud, Double Quartet, Face au toro, Da Capo, Diverses Blessures and most recently Tribute to Jack Kerouac, Exit, and Films noirs.

He founded the Minotaure Jazz Orchestra, a brass band who recycle themes from popular Spanish music. Then in 1997 with the quartet Chants du Monde he revisited traditional music from the whole world and particularly that of the South of France. His dedication to jazz was reflected in his show Out, the music of Eric Dolphy, a tribute to the American jazz musician.

Since then his projects have echoed his enthusiasm for fusing genres: Le Sud Attaque in 1999, Dobrogea at the Fondation Royaumont in June 2000, Encuentros with the singer Esperanza Fernández in 2002, and most recentlyL'Arrosoir et le mirliton built around the risqué songs of the Nivernais, Cantilènes with Mônica Passos, Houria Aïchi, and Maja Pavlovska, Canciones de Lorca with l'orchestre de chambre de l'Empordà.

His reunion with guitarist and composer Claude Barthélemy led, in autumn 2006, to the creation of the quartet Distances with Olivier Sens and Pierre Dayraud. At the same time, he continued his work around the voice with two new shows, My Love Songs and Sketches with the singer Claudia Solal and her septet. In 2009 he created Toulouse Liqaa, a mix of Arabo-Andalusian music and jazz. For many years he has been working as a duo with pianist Philippe Léogé, with whom he made two recordings including 2012's Le Chant de la Terre, arranged by Déodat de Séverac and the Catalan classical musician Federico Mompou. In 2012 he also created the jazz fusion ensemble Tool Box including bassist Frédéric Monino and drummer François Laizeau. The group gave a concert on October 26, 2013 that was broadcast on France Musique. With Enzo Cormann, Charlène Martin, and Paul Brousseau, he presented a children's show at the end of 2012, Le Blues de Jean Lhomme, which was released as a picture book and CD by La Joie de Lire with illustrations by Natasha Krenbol. Also in 2013, he recorded and toured with Canciones with Paloma Pradal.

A 52-minute documentary by Jean-Marc Augereau, Jean-Marc Jouany, and Pierre Condat, Jazz en Padovani, was released in 2013.

== Discography ==
=== As leader ===
- Demain Matin (Metro, 1983)
- Padovani Sax Blues (Big Noise, 1986)
- Comedy (Big Noise, 1987)
- Tres Horas De Sol (CELP, 1988)
- One for Pablo (CELP, 1989)
- Sud (K617/AFAA, 1991)
- Nimeno (Label Bleu, 1991)
- Mingus Cuernavaca Mingus (Label Bleu, 1992)
- Quatuor (AA, 1994)
- Nocturne (Label Bleu, 1994)
- Takiya! Tokaya! (Hopi, 1997)
- Chants du Monde (Hopi, 1998)
- Jazz Angkor (Hopi, 1998)
- Le Minotaure Jazz Orchestra (Hopi, 2000)
- De Nulle Part (Hopi, 2002)
- Out: Tribute to Eric Dolphy (Deux Z, 2003)
- L'Arrosoir et Le Mirlito (Modal Pleinjeu, 2005)
- Cantilenes (Le Chant du Monde, 2005)
- Exit Talking Blues Jazz Poem (La Grande Ritournelle/SoleArt, 2008)
- Sketches (Pype Line, 2010)
- Motian in Motion (Naive, 2015)

=== As sideman ===
- Claude Barthelemy, Moderne (Owl, 1983)
- Claude Barthelemy, Real Politi-K (Big Noise, 1986)
