= Pierre Dutour =

French trumpeter, composer, and orchestra conductor (1931–2023)

- Born: 10 November 1931; Boulogne-sur-Gesse, France
- Died: 31 October 2023 (aged 91)
- Occupations: Trumpeter; Composer; Orchestra conductor

Pierre Dominique Lucien Dutour (10 November 1931 – 31 October 2023) was a French trumpeter, composer, arranger, and orchestra conductor.

== Biography ==
Born in Boulogne-sur-Gesse on 10 November 1931, Dutour spent time with refugees during World War II, one of whom was the leader of a local brass band. Dutour became inspired by the music of Louis Armstrong. For thirteen years, he played the saxhorn. After the war, he joined the Orchestre de Henri Lovel in Toulouse and played the bandoneon. He also played in the orchestras of Alix Combelle, Aimé Barelli, and Jacques Hélian. In the 1960s, he joined the Jeunesses musicales de France, directed by Claude Bolling. Other musicians he played alongside included Joe Dassin, Jack Arel, and Jean-Claude Petit. Dutour also played with French zeuhl group Magma.

Dutour died on 1 November 2023, at the age of 91.

== Discography ==
- Pierre Dutour et son Orchestre – Dance & Mood Music

== Filmography ==
=== Composer ===
- Feelings (1974)
- Madame de Sévigné : Idylle familiale avec Bussy-Rabutin (1979)
- Le Fils du cordonnier (1994)
- Noël et les garçons (2000)

=== Trumpeter ===
- Liza (1972)
- Le Bal (1983)
- The Best Job in the World (1996)
