= Jack Diéval =

French jazz pianist, composer, and bandleader

Jacques "Jack" Diéval (December 21, 1920, Douai – October 31, 2012) was a French jazz pianist, composer, and bandleader.

Diéval's parents were also jazz musicians, who led an ensemble known as the DéDé Jazz Band. He studied music at the Douai Conservatory with Victor Gallois, and was playing professionally in Lille from age 14. After working briefly in 1942 at Tunis Radio, he relocated to Paris, where he worked with Alix Combelle from 1943 to 1946. After the war he worked with Don Byas, Noël Chiboust, Bill Coleman, Stephane Grappelli, James Moody, and Hubert Rostaing, and founded his own quintet in 1953, whose sidemen included Bill Tamper on trombone and Jean-Claude Fohrenbach on saxophone.

In the 1970s he played with Roger Guerin and Michel Gaudry, and worked on compositions, including 1973's Le Serpent Vert.
