= Grand prix du théâtre (Académie française) =

The grand prix du théâtre is a theatre award established in 1980 by the Foundation Le Métais-Larivière and awarded annually to a playwright in recognition for his/her body of work. The Académie française is responsible for selecting the winner.

== Laureates ==
- 1980: Jean Anouilh
- 1981: Gabriel Arout
- 1982: Georges Neveux
- 1983: Marguerite Duras
- 1984: Jean Vauthier
- 1985: René de Obaldia
- 1986: Raymond Devos
- 1987: Rémo Forlani and Jean-Claude Brisville
- 1988: Loleh Bellon
- 1989: Edric Caldicott and François Billetdoux
- 1990: Jean-Claude Brisville
- 1991: Jean-Claude Grumberg
- 1992: non attributed
- 1993: Fernando Arrabal
- 1994: non attributed
- 1995: Roland Dubillard
- 1996: non attributed
- 1997: Didier Van Cauwelaert
- 1998: Romain Weingarten
- 1999: non attributed
- 2000: Yasmina Reza
- 2001: Éric-Emmanuel Schmitt
- 2002: Jean-Michel Ribes
- 2003: Victor Haïm
- 2004: non attributed
- 2005: Jean-Marie Besset
- 2006: Michel Vinaver
- 2007: Valère Novarina
- 2008: non attributed
- 2009: Wajdi Mouawad
- 2010: Philippe Minyana
- 2011: Denise Chalem
- 2012: Marie NDiaye
- 2013: Armand Gatti
- 2014: Éric Assous
- 2015: Joël Pommerat
- 2016: Pascal Rambert
- 2017: Philippe Caubère
- 2018: Hélène Cixous
- 2019: Édouard Baer
- 2020: Enzo Cormann
- 2021: -
- 2022: Jean-François Sivadier
- 2023: Alexandra Badea
- 2024: Florian Zeller
