= Suite for Flute and Jazz Piano Trio =

Album by Claude Bolling

Studio album by Claude Bolling
- Recorded: 1975
- Genre: Jazz; Classical
- Length: 33:47
- Label: CBS Masterworks (1975); Columbia Masterworks (1975); Sony (1990); Milan (1993); Fremeaux (2010)
- Producer: Claude Bolling

CD cover / alternative title

Suite for Flute and Jazz Piano (aka Suite for Flute and Jazz Piano Trio) is a "crossover" composition by French jazz pianist and composer Claude Bolling. The composition, originally written in 1973, is a suite of seven movements, written for a classical flute, and a jazz piano trio (piano, string bass, and drums).

== Album ==
The suite was recorded in 1975 by Bolling, classical flautist Jean-Pierre Rampal, bassist Max Hédiguer, and drummer Marcel Sabiani, and originally released as an LP album by CBS Masterworks Records and Columbia Masterworks.

== Legacy ==
In the U.S., the album was nominated in 1975 for a Grammy Award for Best Chamber Music Performance. A video recording of Bolling and Rampal playing the Suite was recorded in 1976 at the Palace of Versailles in France, and was released on LaserVision video disc and on videotape. Eventually, under the title, Suite for Flute and Jazz Piano Trio, digital CD and DVD versions of the respective audio and video recordings were also released. In 1986, Bolling and Rampal released Bolling's later composition, Suite for Flute and Jazz Piano Trio No. 2.

== Other recordings ==
- 1988: Jeanne Baxtresser (Fanfare Records)
- 2003: Roseli Quartet (Naxos Records)
- 2011: Laurel Zucker (Cantilena Records)
- 2012: Jasmine Choi (Sony Classical)

== Track listing ==
LP side A:

1. "Baroque and Blue" – 5:18
2. "Sentimentale" – 7:45
3. "Javanaise" – 5:15

LP side B:

1. "Fugace" – 3:50
2. "Irlandaise" – 2:59
3. "Versatile" – 5:07
4. "Véloce" – 3:40

All compositions by Claude Bolling

== Personnel ==
- Jean-Pierre Rampal — flute, bass flute on "Versatile"
- Claude Bolling — piano
- Max Hédiguer — bass
- Marcel Sabiani — drums
