= The Nightcaps (Texas band) =

American rock band

- Origin: Dallas, Texas, U.S.
- Genres: Rock and roll; rockabilly; garage rock
- Years active: 1958–2009
- Label: Vandan
- Past members: Billy Joe Shine; Gene Haufler; David Swartz; Mario Daboub; Jack Allday

The Nightcaps were an American rock and roll band formed in Dallas, Texas, in 1958 and were active, in varying lineups, until 2009. They became one of the most popular bands in Dallas and scored regional hits in the early 1960s with "Wine, Wine, Wine" and "Thunderbird", a song which was later recorded by ZZ Top. The songs gained the group notoriety outside of their own region, and during the 1960s they toured in other parts of the country, particularly around the South. The group was a forerunner for many of the Dallas garage bands of the era and their raunchy, blues-based sound influenced artists such as Jimmie Vaughan and Stevie Ray Vaughan. In 2009, they were honored for their accomplishments by the Texas Senate.

== History ==
The Nightcaps were formed by Billy Joe Shine and Gene Haufler in Dallas, Texas in 1958. Their original lineup consisted of Shine on lead vocals, Gene Haufler on rhythm guitar, David Swartz on lead guitar, Mario Daboub on bass, and Jack Allday on drums. The Nightcaps recorded their only LP album, Wine, Wine, Wine, at WRR's Fair Park studio in 1959. At the time, all of the band members were high school students. They began by playing sock hops and school dances, and playing R&B covers, but also began writing songs, usually written by Shine. They secured frequent gigs in the Dallas area and were often paid from $50–200 a night ($500-$2000 in 2026 dollars). They were noticed by local entrepreneur Tom Brown, who initially attempted to have them signed to RCA Victor, but then signed them to his own local Vandan label.

The Nightcaps' recorded their debut single featuring two songs written by Shine, "Wine Wine Wine" b/w "Nightcap Rock". According to Shine, he wrote "Wine, Wine, Wine" during a school study hall following a class where the students had been taught that Jesus turned water into wine. The song became a hit in Dallas and received airplay in other parts of the country. The group got offers to play far beyond Dallas. Their second single, "Thunderbird" b/w "Ole Jose," released in 1961, was also a hit in Dallas. The group recorded the album, Wine, Wine, Wine, which was released that year, and featured a mixture of rockabilly, blues, and instrumental tracks. The instrumental "Tough That's All" showcased David Schwartz's lead guitar playing. Also appearing on the album was jazz saxophone player John Hardee, credited under the name John Hardtimes. Though the album did not crack the national charts, it got pirated around the country and made it possible for the Nightcaps to get bookings across the south.

The British Invasion, though it presented a challenge, did not prevent the band from remaining popular as a live act well into the 1960s.

The group went through several lineup changes in the 1960s. Dennis Mills, playing bass & vocals, of the Floyd Dakil Group, joined the band in 1962. Len Mills, playing guitar and keyboards, of the Essex Band in Pampa Texas, joined the band in 1969. Chris Brown, playing drums, of the Exotics, joined the band in 1968. Gary Mears of the Original Casuals, another Dallas band, briefly joined.

During this period, they became a major influence on musicians such as Jimmie Vaughan and his younger brother, Stevie Ray Vaughan, as well as future members of ZZ Top, whose later use of the song "Thunderbird" (credited to themselves) would become the source of legal controversy. Vaughan later recorded "Thunderbird," and ZZ Top chose it to open their Fandango album.

Eventually, advancing maturity, marriage and general weariness led most of the members into regular jobs and professions. "All of us but Len are sales representatives. He just got a degree from Texas A&M in environmental design. Dennis works for Parks-Davis Auctioneers and travels all over the country during the week. Chris works for radio station KBOX. Gene is with Universal Pictures Corporation." Billy Joe Shine became a furniture manufacturing representative, but was still fronting the Nightcaps on weekends in the 1990s, and he remained a popular musical figure in and around Dallas for many years. On May 13, 2009, The Nightcaps were recognized by the Senate of the State of Texas, 81st Legislature, with SENATE RESOLUTION No. 800, "congratulating members of The Nightcaps on their 50th year as a top Dallas performing group; current members of the group include original members Billy Joe Shine and Gene Haufler, Dennis Mills, who joined The Nightcaps in 1962 and Len Mills, who joined the group in 1968". Leader Billy Joe Shine died in March 2015.

== Personnel ==
- Billy Joe Shine (lead vocals; 1958 - 2015) deceased 2015, age 75
- Gene Haufler (guitar & harmonica; 1958 - 2017) deceased 2017, age 76
- David Swartz (lead guitar; 1958 - 1962) deceased 2014, age 73
- Mario Daboub (bass; 1958 - 1961) deceased 2015, age 74
- Jack Allday (drums; 1958 - 1964) deceased 2023, age 82
- Dennis Mills (bass & vocals; 1962–2015)
- Len Mills (guitar, keyboard & vocals; 1966-2015)
- Chris Brown (Drums 1964 - 1999)
- John Hardee (sax on LP and occasional sideman)

== Discography ==
Singles

- "Wine Wine Wine" b/w "Nightcap Rock" (Vandan, 1959)
- "Thunderbird" b/w "Ole Jose" (Vandan, 1960)
- "24 Hours" b/w "No Parking" (Vandan, 1960)
- "Next Time You See Me" b/w "I Got The Blues" (Vandan, 1962)
- "Wine Wine Wine No. 2" b/w "Walking the Dog" (Vandan, 1963)
- "Mystery Train" b/w "Darlin" (Vandan, 1964)

Album

- "Wine Wine Wine" (Vandan, 1961)
