= Al Jones (drummer) =

American jazz drummer

Albert Francis Jones (December 18, 1930, Philadelphia - April 1976) was an American jazz drummer.

Jones played with Lionel Hampton in 1949 and with Dizzy Gillespie in 1951–1953, including for tours of Europe. He also worked in the early 1950s with Joe Carroll, Miles Davis, Milt Jackson, and Wade Legge. Later in the 1950s he played with Arnett Cobb and accompanied the singers Billie Holiday, Sarah Vaughan, and Dinah Washington. After touring Europe with the Living Theater of New York in 1962, he moved permanently to Belgium, where he founded his own group to play as a house band in a Belgian club. His sidemen were Jean Fanis and Roger van Haverbeke. This ensemble played with visiting Americans such as Dexter Gordon, Milt Jackson, and Clark Terry. He also worked with Dany Doriz.
