= Enzo Cormann =

French playwright (born 1953)

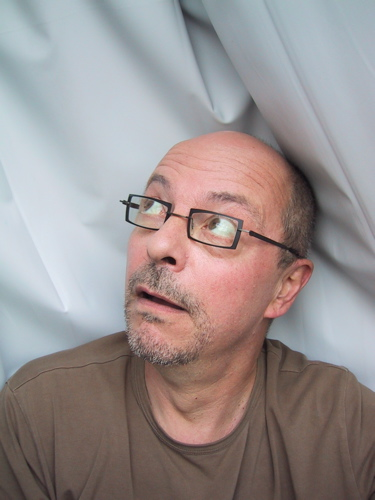
- Cormann in 2006
- Born: 25 April 1953 (age 73); Sos, Lot-et-Garonne, France
- Occupations: Playwright, theater director, writer, composer

Enzo Cormann (born 25 April 1953 in Sos, Lot-et-Garonne) is a French writer, playwright, theater director and composer. He is the author of around forty plays. Until 2019 he worked as a lecturer at several international theater schools. In 2020 he was awarded with the Grand prix du théâtre.

== Career ==
Cormann has worked as a playwright and theater director since the early 1980s. His works are translated and performed in many countries. In France his plays are most commonly published by the publishing house Editions de Minuit. As an in-house writer, he was initially engaged at the National Theatre of Strasbourg, then at the Center Dramatique de Valence, before becoming dramaturgical advisor at the Théâtre des Céléstins in Lyon. Cormann was also a writer and narrator for radio plays.

Since the early 1990s he has also published many musical works. He released several records with saxophonist Jean-Marc Padovani as part of their collaboration "La Grande Ritournelle". Most of his musical works can be affiliated to Jazz.

Since 1995 he has worked as a lecturer at various theater schools. He taught at "ENSATT" (École Nationale Supérieure des Arts et Techniques du Théâtre) in Lyon, where he has been the leader of the Writers-Playwrights department since 2003. He also worked as lecturer at the Charles III University of Madrid as part of a master's degree in Theater Creation. From 2015 he has been the artistic director of the "European Atelier for the Theater" organized by the Center National des Ecritures du Spectacle. According to his own statement, he has been retired as a lecturer since 2019.

For all his dramatic stage plays he was honored with the Grand Prix de theater by the Académie française in 2020.

== Works ==
- 1982: Credo, Le rôdeur
- 1983: Berlin, Ton danseur est la mort
- 1984: Noises
- 1986: Sang et eau, Le roman Prométhée
- 1987: Palais Mascotte
- 1989: Sade, Concert d'enfers
- 1992: Takiya ! Tokaya !
- 1993: La Plaie et le couteau and L'Apothéose secrète (tombeau de Gilles de Rais)
- 1995: Diktat
- 1997: Toujours l'orage
- 1998: Le Dit de Jésus-Marie-Joseph, in "petites pièces d'auteurs"
- 2002: Je m'appelle. A film by Stéphane Elmadjian
- 2003: Cairn, À quoi sert le théâtre?, Mingus, Cuernavaca
- 2004: La Révolte des anges
- 2006: Le Testament de Vénus, L'Autre
- 2007: Surfaces sensibles
- 2008: Je m'appelle
- 2009: Le Jeu d'histoires libres
- 2011: Vita Nova Jazz
- 2012: Bluff, trois trios à l’usage des jeunes générations, Ce que seul le théâtre peut dire – considérations poélitiques
- 2013: Hors jeu, Le Blues de Jean Lhomme
- 2014: Pas à vendre
