= Michel Pastre =

French jazz saxophonist

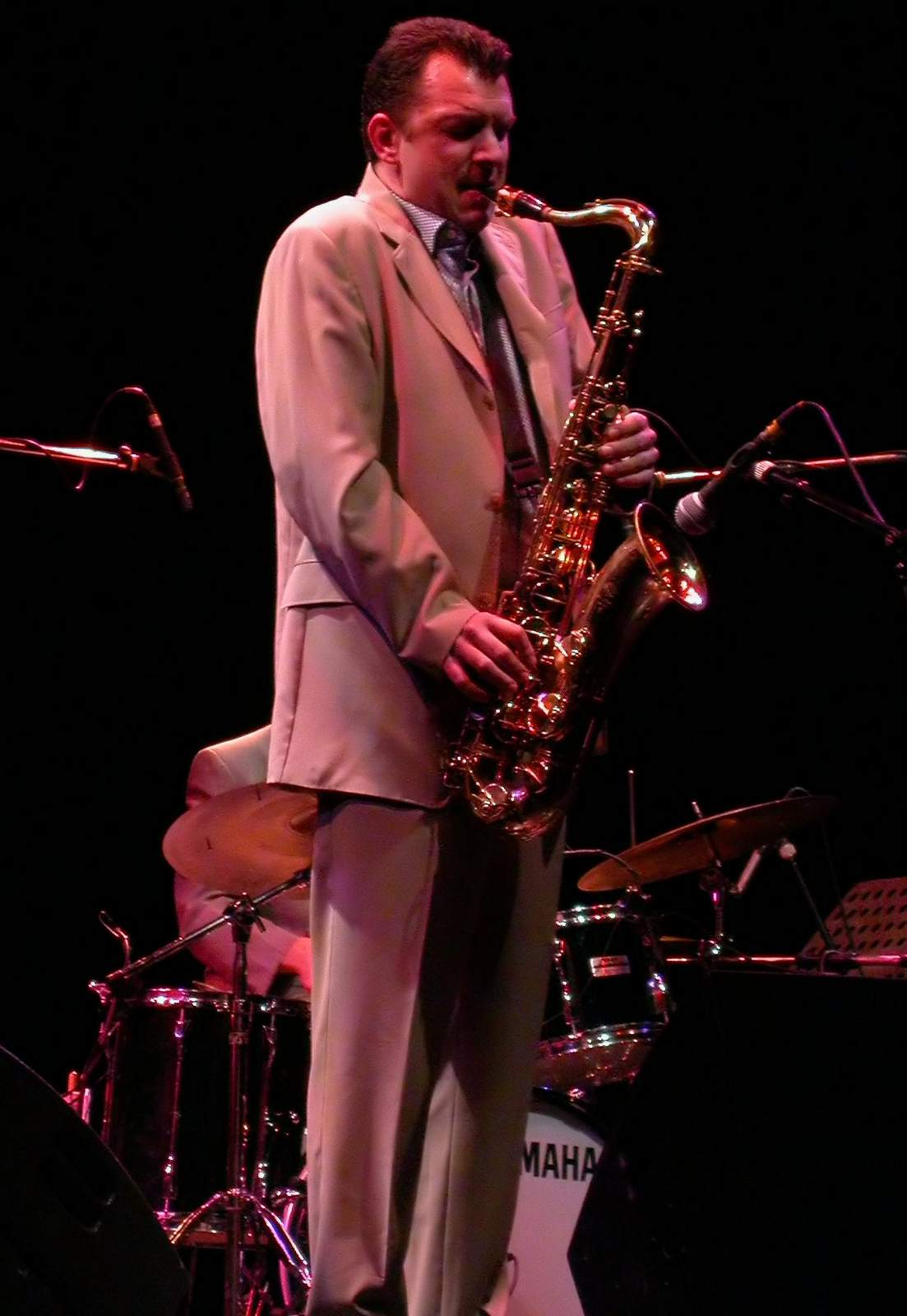
- Michel Pastre at Jazz à Juan Révélations 2005

Background information
- Born: April 7, 1966; Nîmes, France
- Genres: Jazz
- Occupation: Musician
- Instrument: Tenor saxophone
- Years active: 1991 –
- Labels: Djaz Records, Jazz aux Remparts, Columbia Records, Chrystal Records

Michel Pastre (born April 7, 1966) is a French jazz tenor saxophonist.

== Career ==
After trying the drums and the alto saxophone, he finally turned to the tenor saxophone. From 1991 to 1998, he was a member of Banana Jazz and Tuxedo Big Band. In 1995 he joined the Super swing machine of Gérard Badini, and in 1997 he started a quintet with trumpeter Alain Bouchet. In 1999 he performed with Al Casey, (Fats Waller's guitarist). In 2000 he founded his own band, the Michel Pastre Big band, with which he performed jazz.

== Discography ==
as Leader
Date	Album	Group	Label
1999	Live during a French Tour	Michel Pastre Septet, featuring Al Casey and David "Bubba" Brooks	Djaz Records 713-2
2001	Diggin' the Count	Michel Pastre Big Band	Djaz Records 723-2
2002	Jumping with César	Michel Pastre Quartet	Djaz Records 726-2
2005	Free Swing	Michel Pastre Quartet	Djaz Records 734-2
2009	To Prez and Count	Michel Pastre Big Band	Jazz aux Remparts
2009	Pat Giraud Réunion	Pat Giraud/Michel Pastre Quartet	
2012	Battle Royal	Michel Pastre Big Band V.S. Laurent Mignard Duke Orchestra	Columbia
2015	Travelin' light with Billie	Dominique Magloire & Michel Pastre Quartet and Big Band	Chrystal Records
2015	Charlie Christian Project: Memories of You	Michel Pastre Quintet	
2016	7:33 To Bayonne	Jérôme Etcheberry, Michel Pastre, Louis Mazetier	Jazz aux Remparts - JAR 64024
2017	Fathers & SONS	The "French/Italian" Connexion	
2017	feat. dany doritz & ken peplowski	Michel Pastre 5tet, Dany Doritz, Ken Peplowski	MPQ002
as Sideman
Date	Album	Group	Label
1993	What a dream	Banana Jazz	Jazztrade 04
1994	Rhythm Is Our Business	Tuxedo Big Band	TBB Records 101
1996	Siesta at the Fiesta	Tuxedo Big Band	TBB Records 102
1998	To Ella and Chick	Tuxedo Big Band	TBB Records 103
1999	Fletcher Henderson's Unrecorded Arrangements for Benny Goodman	Bob Wilber and the Tuxedo Big Band	Arbors Records Inc.19229
2000	We got rhythm	Paris Swing Orchestra	Black and Blue BB285-2 ND217
2005	Scriabin's groove	Gérard Badini Super Swing Machine	
2014	My time is now	Austin O'Brien Big Five Band	
