= François Biensan =

French musician

François Biensan (born September 28, 1945, Bordeaux) is a French trumpeter and harmonica player, working primarily in jazz and blues styles.

Biensan also plays drums and organ in addition to his main instruments. He is best known as a trumpeter, however, playing this instrument professionally from the mid-1960s with Christian Morin. His jazz associations in the 1970s and 1980s included Gérard Badini, Benny Carter, Doc Cheatham, Bill Coleman, Jimmy Forrest, François Guin, Lionel Hampton, Daniel Huck, Benny Waters, and Sam Woodyard. He also played organ with Tiny Grimes and drums with Marc Laferrière.
