= Christian Azzi =

French jazz musician (1926–2020)

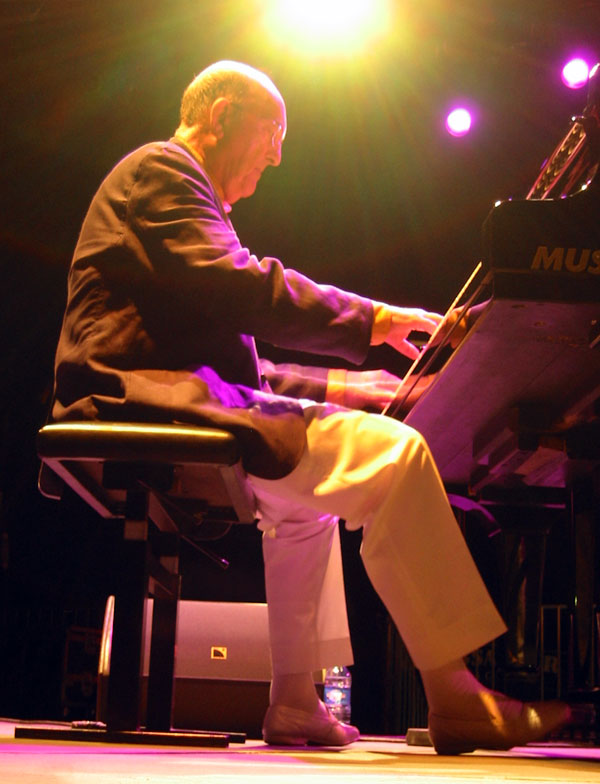
- Christian Azzi at the Juan-les-Pins festival in July 2005

Background information
- Born: 1 December 1926
- Died: 21 November 2020 (aged 93)
- Occupation: Musician
- Instrument: Piano

Christian Azzi (1 December 1926 – 21 November 2020) was a jazz pianist. He studied piano at the Schola Cantorum de Paris. He discovered jazz music during World War II, specially through recordings made by V-Disc (Victory disc) for the American soldiers.

== Career ==
He is best known for interpreting Jazz from New Orleans. In 1946, he became part of Claude Luter's orchestra with regular gigs at Caveau des lorientais, a celebrated jazz venue. In February 1948, with encouragement from Hugues Panassié, the orchestra played at the first jazz festival in Nice, with immediate success. They also did the soundtrack of French comedy Rendezvous in July.

In 1949, Sidney Bechet chose the band for his musical career, and Christian Azzi became his official pianist. Sidney Bechet and his orchestra played at the club du Vieux-Colombier, upon invitation from Paul Annet Badel. This line-up with Bechet playing at the club became very celebrated. When Christian Azzi left Bechet in 1953, he already had 100 registered songs with him in addition to 60 songs with Claude Luter. He also made songs with Maxim Saury (18 titles), Don Byas (6 titles) and solo (4 titles).

Azzi was member at various times of Claude Luter et ses Liorentais, Maxim Saury et son orchestre, Sidney Bechet et l'orchestre de Claude Luter. He also headed the Poumi Arnaud & Christian Azzi Sextet.

Towards the end of his career, Azzi and Poumy Arnaud a drummer with Sidney Bechet created Sidney Bechet Memory Orchestra, in tribute to the musician. Many former musicians who had worked with Bechet joined in. They revived many old tunes including the much-loved titles like "Petite Fleur" and "Dans les rues d’Antibes".
