= Claude Barthélemy (musician) =

French jazz guitarist

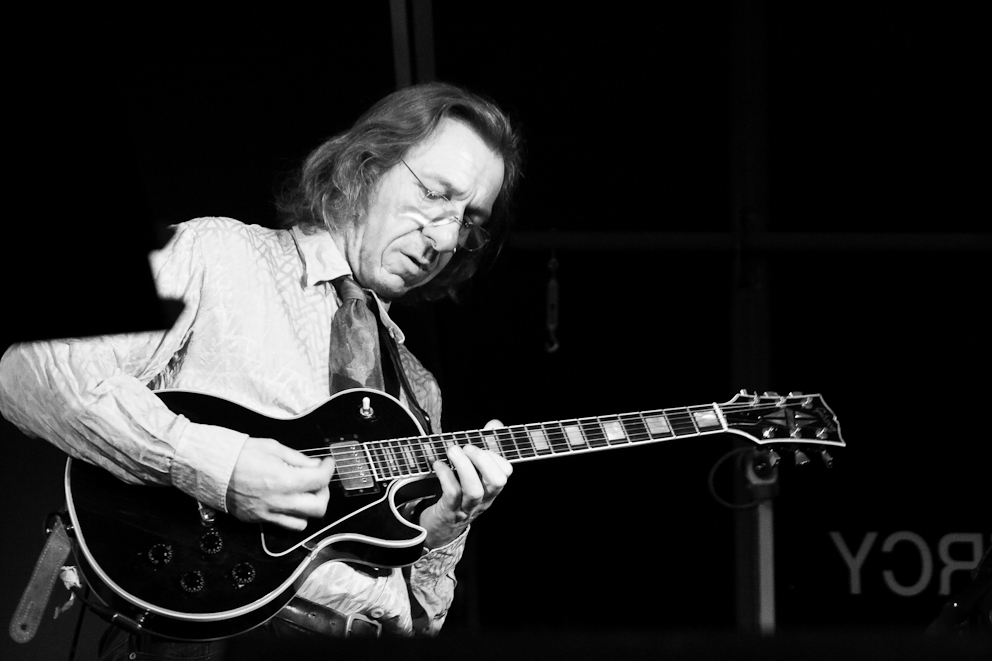

Background information
- Born: August 22, 1956 (age 68); St. Denis, France
- Genres: Jazz
- Occupation: Musician
- Instrument: Guitar
- Labels: Label Bleu

Claude Barthélemy (born August 22, 1956) is a French jazz guitarist.

Barthélemy started playing guitar when he was fourteen years old. He began playing with Michel Portal's ensemble Unit in 1978 and worked with Aldo Romano, Stu Martin, and Gérard Marais. He assembled a trio with Jacques Mahieux and Jean-Luc Ponthieux in the early 1980s, in addition to working with Jean-Marc Padovani and Nouvel Orchestra Philharmonique. Beginning in the mid-1980s he concentrated on composition, writing for mixed ensembles; some of his pieces incorporated video and dance. He co-founded the group Zhivaro in 1987 and from 1989 to 1991 was the director of Orchestre National de Jazz. In the 1990s he led the octet La Nouvelle-Orleans, the quartet Monsieur Claude, and accompanied Elise Caron and Sylvie Cobo.

== Discography ==
- Jaune et Encore (Cobalt, 1979)
- Forest One (Celluloid, 1981)
- Moderne (Owl, 1983)
- Real Politi-K (Big Noise 1986)
- Claire (Label Bleu, 1990)
- JACK-L!Ne (Label Bleu, 1991)
- Solide (Evidence, 1993)
- Monsieur Claude (Deux Z, 1996)
- Sereine (Label Bleu, 2000)
- Admirabelamour (Label Bleu, 2003)
- La Fete De L'Eau (Le Chant Du Monde, 2004)
- Claude Barthelemy & L'Occidentale (Laborie Jazz, 2015)
- Roxinelle (Maxiphone, 2016)
