= Laurent de Wilde =

French pianist, composer, and writer

Laurent de Wilde (born 19 December 1960) is a French jazz pianist, composer, and writer.

== Biography ==
Born in Washington, D.C., United States, and raised in France from 1964, he joined the École Normale Supérieure in 1981, philosophy section. In 1983, during a music scholarship, he lived in New York at the Brooklyn campus of Long Island University. At the expiration of his scholarship six months later, he decided to settle permanently in New York. With the encouragement and advice of his elders, he performed in town and joined the trumpeter Eddie Henderson's regular band.

=== Music career ===
In 1987, he recorded the first of a series of four albums for Ida Records Off the Boat with Eddie Henderson, Ralph Moore, backed by Ira Coleman on bass and Billy Hart on drums. In 1989, Odd and Blue was released with Coleman and Jack DeJohnette (drums), followed in 1990 by Colors of Manhattan, with Coleman, Henderson and Lewis Nash. De Wilde then returned to Paris to settle but came back to New York in 1992 to record a trio album, Open Changes, with Coleman and Billy Drummond (drums). The success of this record in 1993 earned him the Django Reinhardt Prize, awarded to the best musician of the year. He now shares his time between Paris and his career in New York as a leader or sideman with Barney Wilen, Aldo Romano and André Ceccarelli.

In 1995, de Wilde signed with Sony Jazz (Columbia) and recorded The Back Burner. In 1996, he published Monk (L'Arpenteur/Gallimard), a biography of Thelonious Monk on which he had worked a long time. The book was an immediate success, and joined the permanent Folio catalog in October 1997. It was awarded the Charles Delaunay Prize in 1996 as "the best book about jazz" as well as the Pelleas Award and a Firecracker Alternative Book Award. Monk has been translated and published in New York, London, Tokyo, Barcelona and Milan.

In 1997, de Wilde released his album in trio-quartet for Columbia. Spoon-a-Rhythm earned him an award at the Victoires de la Musique in 1998 as "jazz artist of the year". His trio toured intensively in Europe, the United States and Japan for over two years. De Wilde decided then to focus on the electronic revolution that radically redefined contemporary jazz. He joined the group of Ernest Ranglin, true founding father of Jamaican reggae and met with different music movers such as Samia, Cosmik Connection or Roudoudou.

The result was an album that claimed for a mutation in jazz: Time for Change was released for Warner Jazz in 2000. The band (Flavio Boltro, Gaël Horellou, Minino Garay, Jules Bikoko and Stéphane Huchard) gave more than a hundred concerts in France and abroad. Enriched by this experience, de Wilde went into studio again. In 2002 he recorded Stories for Warner, released in spring 2003. His new group with DJ Ben on turntables and Julien Charlet on drums toured throughout 2003-2004. During the same period, de Wilde wrote music for children's programs on France 3 TV and has composed scores for several feature films for television on TF1 and France 2.

In fall 2004 de Wilde composed and recorded with his new band, Organics. The album was released by Nocturne. This group featured Gaël Horellou on sax and computer, Philippe Bussonnet on bass and Yoann Serra on drums. That same year, de Wilde pursued his collaborations with André Ceccarelli, Eddie Henderson (Echoes) and Rick Margitza.

In February 2006, de Wilde decided to return to the acoustic trio, and invited Laurent Robin (drums) and Darryl Hall (bass) to take a break from those electronics years. The result is an album rich in rhythms, The Present (Nocturne). The same year, de Wilde met a slam artist whose album had just been out and was looking for a jazz pianist to take the band on the road. Impressed by the quality of the project, de Wilde agreed and it was the beginning of the magnificent ascension of Abd al Malik who would soon be recognized as the new figure of slam. The band toured for two and a half years and has performed in more than 160 major halls around the world.

Between tours, de Wilde took the time to compare the two worlds he lived in for twenty years, and recorded the encounter of an acoustic piano and a computer. As a duet with the participation of Otisto 23, de Wilde produces sounds from his piano (with or without the keyboard) that Otisto records in real time before looping and processing them, building the musical form as it unfolds. The album, released in September 2007 (Nocturne), called PC Pieces, takes the form of a small book in which de Wilde describes the long road leading to this object. Inside the CD, a dual disc offers the music on one side and video on the other: videos synchronized to the music and a filmed concert. In 2010, the project extended into a second volume, entitled FLY! enriched by the experience of touring and playing with this group for two years. The relationship between the computer and the piano is purified, the music is more instinctive, more emotional and more rhythmic. Added to the group is videographer Nico Ticot (XLR Project), a true magician of colours and volumes, matches the music with dreamlike precision.

De Wilde has produced and toured with the Diane Tell Boris Vian Project (Docteur Boris & Mister Vian, Celluloid, 2009) and has produced four volumes of tales from Africa with Souleymane Mbodj editions for Milan. He has also published short stories (Jazz Me Blue, 2009, Au Duc des Lombards, 2010) and participated in the making of a broadcast program for Arte around Thelonious Monk and the book he has written about him.

== Discography ==
- 1987: Off the Boat
- 1989: Odd and Blue
- 1990: Colors of Manhattan
- 1992: Open Changes
- 1995: The Back Burner
- 1997: Spoon-a-Rhythm
- 2000: Time 4 Change
- 2003: Stories
- 2004: Organics
- 2006: The Present
- 2007: PC Pieces
- 2010: Fly
- 2011: Colors of Manhattan
- 2011: Organics/The Present
- 2012: Over the Clouds
- 2013: Back Burner
- 2014: Fly Superfly
- 2016: Riddles: duet with Ray Lema
- 2017: New Monk Trio
- 2021: Wheels: duet with Ray Lema

== Books ==
- Monk, Gallimard, 1997, ISBN 2-07-040314-9
