= Maxim Saury =

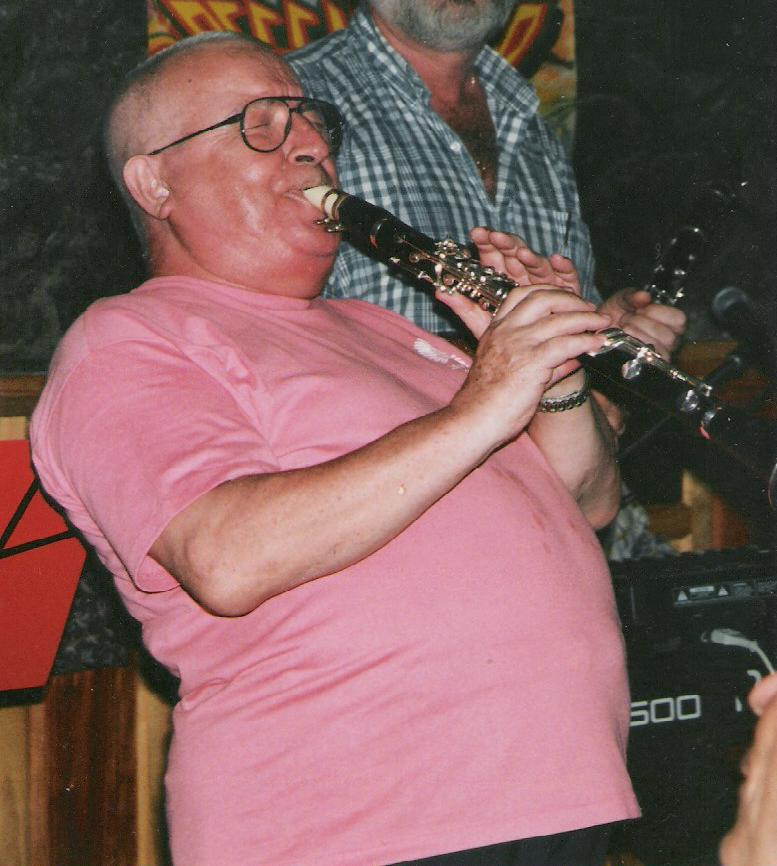
- Saury in concert on November 30, 1996

Background information
- Born: February 27, 1928; Enghien-les-Bains, France
- Died: November 15, 2012 (aged 84) Boulogne-Billancourt
- Genres: Jazz
- Occupation: Musician
- Instrument: Clarinet

Maxim Saury (February 27, 1928 – November 15, 2012) was a French jazz clarinetist and bandleader.

== Career ==
The son of a violinist, Saury began playing violin the age of twelve. He switched to clarinet because he admired the playing of Hubert Rostaing. Shortly after World War II he began playing with Christian Azzi and Claude Bolling and briefly led a trio in 1949. In the 1950s he founded the New Orleans Sound, which included Jean-Claude Naude, and went on several tours worldwide. He played with Barney Bigard in the U.S. in the late 1960s and returned the U.S. twice in the 1970s. As a representative figure in French traditional jazz, he was frequently invited to play music, or the role of a musician, in film and television, including in Bonjour Tristesse, Young Sinners (Les Tricheurs), Mon oncle, and Adieu Philippine.
