= Gaël Horellou =

French jazz saxophonist and composer (born 1975)

Gaël Horellou (born in Caen, France in 1975) is a French jazz saxophonist and composer.

== Biography ==
Saxophonist with a classical and jazz background, his career started in 1992.

From 1994 to 1997, he is a member of the Collectif Mu and helps founding the Crescent Jazz Club where he shared the stage with experimented guests (Charles Bellanzi, Luigi Trussardi, Clovis Nicolas, Wayne Dockery, Eric Lelann, Steve Grossman, Peter King, Ricardo del Fra...). In 1996, with KPT’N PLANET (Philippe Garcia on drums) they founded the group Cosmik Connection, an electro-drum’n’jazz fusion laboratory quickly joined by Jérémie Picard (a.k.a. Jahbass).

He joined in 2000, Laurent de Wilde sextet and followed him on tour and in studio for the albums “Time for Change” and “Stories”. 4 years later he collaborated with him on the “Organics” album composition, an electro-jazz quintet with Yoann Sera and Philippe Bussonet. He also perform sax on electronic music recordings (UHT, DJ Volta, DJ Ben...) and starts to produce his own solo performance with an electro-drum’n’bass live, show that he plays under the pseudonym Dual Snake.

He founded the group NHX, a new electro-instrumental laboratory with Yoann Serra on drums and 3 musicians who played in Magma, Philippe Bussonnet (bass), Emmanuel Borghi (fender rhodes) and James Mac Gaw (guitar). Since 2002, Gael Horellou has been performing regularly in trio sax / bass / drums with Geraud Portal and Antoine Paganotti or Philippe Soirat. Three trio albums were released on the Petit Label "Live 2008", "Segment"(2010), "Plo"(2012).

Gaël Horellou met Barry Harris during an internship at The Royal Conservatory of the Hague in 2003. Since, he is studying regularly with the master of bebop in Europe or in the United States.

He produced in 2007 a beautiful nu-jazz album, “Explorations” (DTC Records/ La Baleine), halfway between acoustic and computer composition. The next year he formed a quartet with Jean-Sebastien Simonoviez, Francois Gallix and the American drummer Ari Hoenig. The band recorded a double live album at the Sunside in Paris “Pour la Terre” (DTC Records/ Harmonia Mundi).

Since 2012 he host every month the "After-hours sessions" of the Duc des Lombards (Paris) where he has the opportunity to meet and play with international musicians such as: Jeremy Pelt, Marcus Miller, Roxy Coss, Rodney Green, Jonahtan Barber, Jalil Shaw, Eric Alexander, etc.

In January 2013 he recorded a new quintet live album at the Duc des Lombards in Paris, with Etienne Déconfin (piano), Viktor Nyberg (bass), Antoine Paganotti (drums) and as a special guest, the saxophonist Abraham Burton. “Legacy” was released on Breakz label. In June he worked on the recording session of a new quartet album in New-York for the Spanish label Fresh Sound Records. The album "BrOoklyn" was released in November 2014 with Ari Hoenig (drums), Etienne Déconfin (piano) and Viktor Nyberg (contrebasse).

During 2014 he was in residency at l'Arroisoir (Chalons-sur-Saône) where he recorded "Roy", released on Petit Label in September 2014, with Fredéric Nardin on the Hammond B3 and Antoine Paganotti the drums.

In 2015 he released the electro-jazz album "Synthesis", on DTC Records, with David Patrois (vibes), Geraud Portal (doublebass). He also worked on the project "Identité" a fusion of jazz and maloya, traditional music from La Reunion, with Florent Gac (Hammond B3) and 4 local musicians: Vincent Philéas, Emmanuel Félicité, Jerome Calciné (percussion/vocal) and Nicolas Beaulieu (guitar).

Finally he formed with Ari Hoenig a jazz electronic duo project, “Nasty Factorz”, performed live at Nublu in Manhattan. An album has been recorded in New York and was released in September 2017.

== Discography ==
- 2022 : Dalonaz
- 2019 : Tous le peuples
- 2017 : Identité
- 2017 : Nasty Factorz : Nasty Factorz
- 2016 : Nasty Factorz : EP Mash Up!
- 2016 : Moral De Fer
- 2015 : Synthesis
- 2014 : Brooklyn
- 2014 : Legacy
- 2013 : Time after time
- 2012 : Plo
- 2012 : Live!
- 2011 : Travels
- 2010 : Cosmik Connection : Atomik !
- 2009 : Pour la Terre
- 2007 : NHX - II
- 2006 : Cosmik Connection : Grand Panache !
- 2006 : Explorations
- 2005 : Dual Snake 02
- 2004 : Organics
- 2003 : Stories
- 2002 : NHX - Live
- 1999 : Cosmik Connection : Electrojazz4tet
- 1995 : Collectif Mu : Live au Crescent
