= John Hardee =

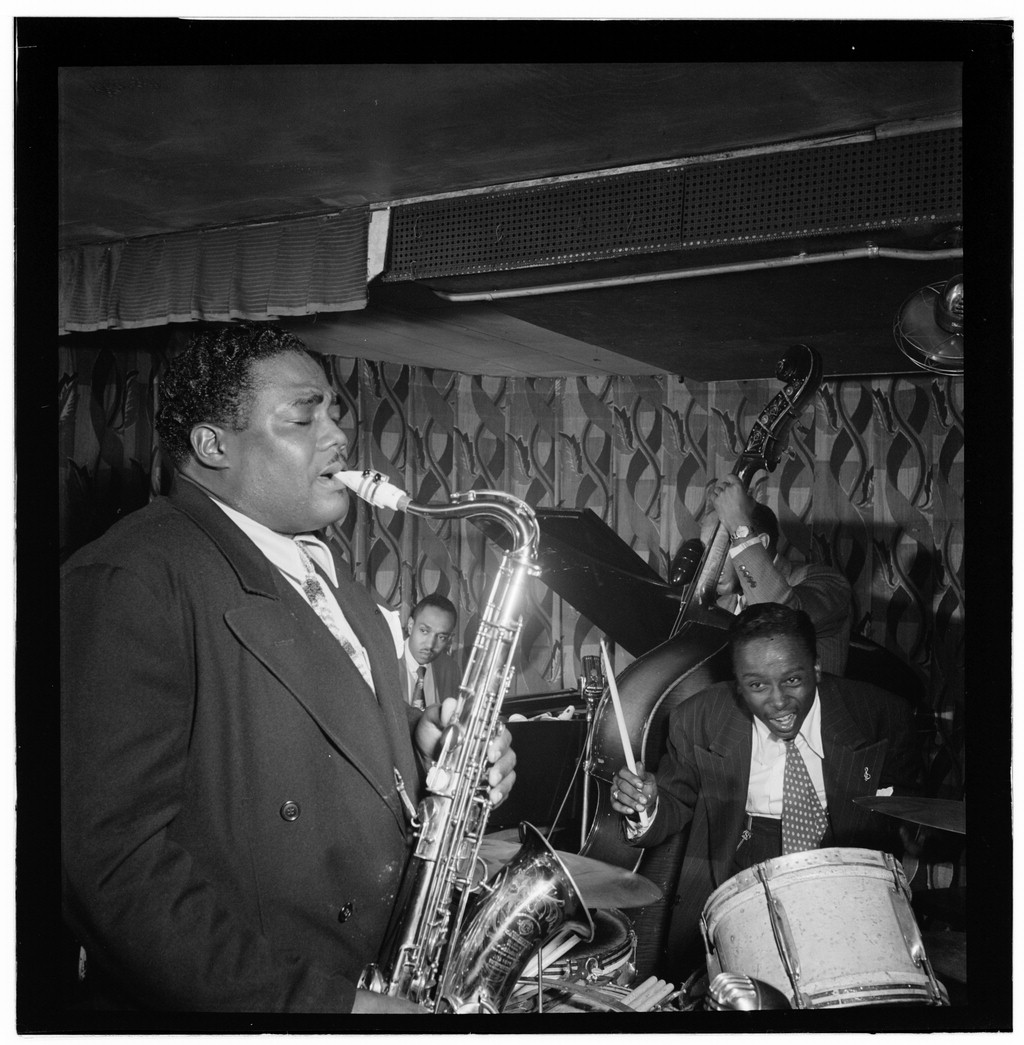
- John Hardee, Famous Door, New York City, c. July 1947

Background information
- Born: December 20, 1918; Corsicana, Texas, U.S.
- Died: May 18, 1984 (aged 65) Dallas, Texas
- Genres: Jazz
- Occupation: Musician
- Instrument: Saxophone

John Hardee (December 20, 1918 – May 18, 1984) was an American jazz tenor saxophonist.

Hardee toured with Don Albert in 1937–38 while he was in college; he graduated in 1941. He directed a Texas school band and served in the Army during World War II. In 1946 he played with Tiny Grimes and then recorded as a bandleader for Blue Note Records between 1946 and 1948, issuing eight releases. In the 1940s and early 1950s he played with Clyde Bernhardt, Cousin Joe, Russell Procope, Earl Bostic, Billy Kyle, Helen Humes, Billy Taylor, and Lucky Millinder. In the 1950s he retired from music and became a schoolteacher. In 1959, he played saxophone on Dallas R&B group The Nightcaps (Texas band) LP Wine, Wine, Wine. He was credited as "Jon Hardtimes" and, although he performed with them occasionally, was not an official member of the group.

== Discography ==
Leader

- John Hardee Swingtet & Sextet: Various Artists – The Blue Note Swingtets (Blue Note, 1946) with Tiny Grimes, Gene Ramey and Sid Catlett
- John Hardy Quartet & Quintet: The Tenor Sax Album – The Savoy Sessions (Savoy Records)
- Tired
- John Hardee 1946–1948
- Hardee’s Partee
- The Forgotten Texas Tenor
- Tenor Sax (Blue Note, 1946)
- Al Haig, Coleman Hawkins, Wardell Gray, John Hardee: Al Haig Meets The Master Saxes, Volume One (Spotlite Records, 1977)
- A Little Blue (Black And Blue, 1999)

Sideman

- Tiny Grimes: The Complete 1944-1950, Vol. 1 & 2 (Blue Moon)
- John Hardee mit Russell Procope Big Six & Billy Kyle’s Big Eight: Giants Of Small-Band Swing, Vol.1 (OJC, 1946)
- Helen Humes: 1945–1947 (Classics)
- Billy Kyle: 1937–1938 (Classics)
- The Nightcaps: Wine,Wine,Wine (Vandan VRLP-8124, 1961, reissued as Charley CR30183, 1980)
