= Noël Chiboust =

Musician

Noël Chiboust (October 4, 1909, Thorigny-sur-Marne - January 17, 1994, Pau) was a French jazz trumpeter and reedist.

== Career ==
Chiboust started out as a violinist, playing in Ray Ventura's orchestra from 1928 to 1931, but settled on trumpet soon after. He did a stint in the French army, then played trumpet in the mid-1930s with Freddy Johnson, Michel Warlop, Coleman Hawkins, and Guy Paquinet. By 1937, he had switched instruments again, this time to tenor saxophone; on this instrument, he worked with Bill Coleman, Joe Keyes, Serge Glykson, Raymond Wraskoff, and Fred Adison. He founded his own ensemble in 1941, which he led until 1969; he continued playing locally with his own big band even after retiring from active touring.
