= Christian Chevallier =

French songwriter, arranger, and jazz orchestra leader

Christian Chevallier (Angers, 12 July 1930 – 14 September 2008) was a French songwriter, arranger, and jazz orchestra leader.
