= Rose Murphy =

American jazz pianist and singer

- Born: April 28, 1913; Xenia, Ohio, U.S.
- Died: November 16, 1989 (aged 76) New York City, U.S.
- Genres: Vocal jazz
- Occupation: Singer
- Instrument: Piano
- Years active: 1930s–1980s

Rose Murphy (April 28, 1913 – November 16, 1989) was an American jazz pianist and singer, famous for the song "Busy Line" and her unique vocal style.

== Music career ==
She was born in Xenia, Ohio, United States. Described by AllMusic's Scott Yanow as having "a unique place in music history", Murphy was known as "the chee chee girl" because of her habit of singing "chee chee" in many of her numbers. She was also known as "the girl with the pale pink voice".

Murphy began her musical career in the late 1930s, playing intermission piano for such performers as Count Basie, and became popular in the United States and United Kingdom in the late 1940s. She is best known for her high-pitched singing style, which incorporated scat singing, giggling, and percussive sound effects. "Busy Line", one of her most well-known songs, made use of perhaps her most famous vocal sound effect: the 'brrp, brrrp' of a telephone ring. A version of the song by Peter Skellern was later used in 1990 by BT Cellnet in a television commercial which was such a success that RCA reissued the original recording. Princess Margaret became a fan after "Busy Line" became a hit in the United Kingdom. She attended Murphy's concerts in London, imitated her while playing the piano and sang "Busy Line" at parties.

From the 1950s to the 1980s, Murphy continued to play at many of the top clubs in New York, such as the Cookery, Joe's Pub and Upstairs At the Downstairs. She was normally accompanied by bassist Slam Stewart or Morris Edwards. These were interspersed with engagements in London and tours of Europe.

== Personal life and death ==
During a two-week engagement at Hollywood Roosevelt's Cinegrill in June 1989, Murphy became ill and returned to New York City. She died in New York aged 76 on November 16, 1989, and, though married four times, left no direct descendants. Her final marriage, from 1950 to 1977, was to Eddie Matthews, a businessman who, from 1928 to 1933, had been married to Ethel Waters. Rose Murphy and her radio broadcasts in the UK are referred to in the novel Under the Pink Light, by the British author Brian Hurst.

== Selected discography ==
- Rose Murphy and Quartette (1955)
  Rose Murphy and Quartette
  Royale
  Royale 1835
- Not Cha-Cha, but Chi-Chi (1957)
  Rose Murphy
  Verve Records
  MGV-2070
- Jazz, Joy and Happiness (1962)
  Rose Murphy
  United Artists
  ULP 1046
