= Jean-Claude Fohrenbach =

French jazz saxophonist

Jean-Claude Fohrenbach (January 5, 1925, Paris – March 30, 2009, Villiers-le-Duc) was a French jazz saxophonist.

Fohrenbach learned clarinet, piano, tenor saxophone, and violin as a child, concentrating on tenor sax once he began playing full-time in the mid-1940s. Early in his career he played with Eddie Bernard and Django Reinhardt before landing a regular gig at the Club Saint-Germain in Paris as the leader of a seven-piece ensemble from 1949 to 1951. After this residency he worked with Claude Bolling, Jack Diéval, Jonah Jones, and Martial Solal in the early and mid-1950s. In the 1960s he performed with Georges Arvanitas, Eric Dolphy, and Sonny Stitt, but quit performing between 1966–1972. Beginning in the late 1970s he worked as an educator, teaching jazz improvisation. He was the keyboard and saxophonist of the singer Jean Ferrat during the composer's career.
