= Dany Doriz =

French musician

Daniel Dorisse, known professionally as Dany Doriz (born 7 September 1941 in Boissy-Saint-Léger) is a French jazz and blues vibraphonist and bandleader.

Doriz learned saxophone and piano as a youth in addition to vibraphone, the latter of which he studied under Geo Daly. In the late 1950s and 1960s, he worked as a sideman for Mickey Baker, Don Byas, Dominique Chanson, Bill Coleman, Peanuts Holland, Memphis Slim, Tete Montoliu, and Albert Nicholas. In the early 1960s, he began founding his own ensembles, working with Gérard Badini, Charles Barrié, Al Jones, Michel Sardaby, and Yannick Singery. From 1970 he was a nightclub owner in Paris. Later associations include work with Georges Arvanitas, Lou Bennett, Milt Buckner, Wild Bill Davis, Michel Denis, Lionel Hampton, Eddie Jones, Duffy Jackson, and Butch Miles.
