= Georges Arvanitas =

French jazz pianist and organist

- Born: June 13, 1931; Marseille, France
- Died: September 25, 2005 (aged 74)
- Genres: Jazz
- Occupations: Pianist, organist
- Instruments: Piano, organ

Georges Arvanitas (June 13, 1931 – September 25, 2005) was a French jazz pianist and organist.

== Life and career ==
He was born in Marseille, a child of Greek immigrants from Constantinople. At the age of four he began studying piano and initially trained as a classical pianist, switching to jazz during his teens. His influences included Bud Powell and Bill Evans. In the late 1950s, he featured on albums by Art Farmer and Louis Hayes, and played with Dexter Gordon and Johnny Griffin. He also worked with Yusef Lateef.

== Discography ==
- 3 am (Pretoria, 1958)
- Cocktail for Three (Pretoria, 1959)
- Soul Jazz (Columbia, 1960)
- Pianos Puzzle (Saravah, 1970)
- In Concert (Futura, 1970)
- Les Classiques Du Jazz (AFA, 1970)
- Orgue Hammond (Neuilly, 1971)
- Douce Ambiance (Neuilly, 1972)
- Live Again (Futura, 1973)
- Porgy and Bess (AFA, 1973)
- Anniversary (AFA, 1975)
- I Like It Cool (REV, 1976)
- The Hound of Music (Psi, 1978)
- Qu'est-Ce Qu'on Joue? with Claude Guilhot (Sign, 1986)
- Round About Midnight (Carrere, 1986)
- Georges Arvanitas Quartet (Carrere, 1987)
- One Night for Three Pianos (Nothing Like Music, 1990)
- Tea for Two with David Murray (Fresh Sound, 1991)
- Recontre (Columbia, 1998)
- Little Florence (Sound Hills, 2000)

=== As sideman ===
With Cat Anderson

- Plays at 4 a.m. (Columbia, 1958)
- Old Folks (All Life, 1980)
- The Ellingtonian (EMI, 2002)

With Ted Curson

- The New Thing & the Blue Thing (Atlantic, 1965)
- Pop Wine (Futura, 1971)
- Cattin' Curson (Marge, 1975)

With Manu Dibango

- Dangwa & Oboso (Atlantic, 1972)
- O Boso (Fiesta, 1972)
- The Original Soul Makossa (Atlantic, 1972)
- Weya & Moni (Atlantic, 1973)

With Maxime Le Forestier

- Mon Frere (Hispavox, 1972)
- Maxime Le Forestier (Polydor, 1973)
- Enregistrement Public (Polydor, 1974)

With others

- Pepper Adams, Live in Europe (Impro 1977)
- Graeme Allwright, Jeanne D'Arc (Mercury, 1972)
- Antoine, Madame Laure Messenger, Claude, Jeremie, et L'Existence De Dieu (Vogue, 1967)
- Jimmy Archey, Jimmy Archey et L'Orchestre Michel Attenoux (Barclay, 1955)
- Svend Asmussen, Embraceable (Storyville, 2015)
- Michel Attenoux, Michel Attenoux et Son Orchestre (Barclay, 1955)
- Michel Attenoux, Hommage a Sidney Bechet (Panorama, 1959)
- Marcel Azzola & Dany Doriz, Jazzola (Black and Blue, 1999)
- Elek Bacsik & Stephane Grappelli Europa Jazz (1982)
- Chet Baker, Live in Paris 1960-63 (France's Concert, 1988)
- Mickey Baker, Bossa Nova en Direct du Bresil (Versailles, 1962)
- Mickey Baker, Mickey Baker Plays Mickey Baker (Versailles, 1962)
- Francois Beranger, Francois Beranger (L'Escargot, 1974)
- Don Byas, Amoureusement Votre (Universal/EmArcy 2007)
- Bill Coleman, Together at Last (Pathe, 1969)
- Buck Clayton, Et Sa Trompette (Vogue, 1966)
- Sonny Criss, Mr. Blues Pour Flirter (Brunswick, 1963)
- Sonny Criss, Live in Italy (Fresh Sound, 2003)
- Nicole Croisille, Femme (Deram, 1975)
- Eddie "Lockjaw" Davis, Eddie Davis Live at Massy 1975 (Spotlight, 1977)
- Nathan Davis, Live in Paris The ORTF Recordings 1966 & 67 (Sam, 2018)
- Jimmy Dawkins, Jimmy Dawkins (Vogue, 1972)
- Eric Demarsan, Le Cercle Rouge (Decca, 2000)
- Dany Doriz, This One's for Basie (Black and Blue, 1994)
- Les Double Six, Les Double Six (Columbia, 1961)
- Les Double Six, Les Double Six (Columbia, 1962)
- Leo Ferre, C'est Extra (Barclay, 1969)
- Leo Ferre, Leo Ferre Chante L'ete 68 (Barclay, 1969)
- Brigitte Fontaine, Brigitte Fontaine (Saravah, 1975)
- Bud Freeman, Satin Doll (All Life, 1980)
- Dexter Gordon, Parisian Concert (Futura, 1973)
- Pierre Gossez, Come Bach (Fontana, 1964)
- Claude Guilhot, Belbology (Vega 1969)
- Claude Guilhot, Traficos (Owl, 1975)
- Raymond Guiot, Joue Domenico Scarlatti (Decca, 1970)
- Rufus Harley, From Philadelphia to Paris (Carrere, 1988)
- Coleman Hawkins, Disorder at the Border (Milan, 1989)
- Andre Hodeir & Henri Crolla, Marie Laforet Saint-Tropez Blues (Fontana, 1960)
- Barney Kessel, What's New... Barney Kessel? (Mercury, 1969)
- Guy Lafitte, Jambo! (RCA, Victor 1968)
- Yusef Lateef, Psychicemotus (Impulse!, 1965)
- Bernard Lavilliers, Bernard Lavilliers (Motors, 1977)
- Colette Magny, Melocoton (CBS, 1963)
- Anita O'Day, Anita O'Day in Berlin (MPS/BASF 1971)
- Pony Poindexter & Rene Thomas, Blue Note Paris 1964 (Royal Jazz, 1990)
- Babik Reinhardt, Joue Sidney Bechet (Vogue, 1968)
- Henri Renaud, Blue Cylinder (Psi, 1970)
- Brother John Sellers, Blues and Spirituals (Columbia, 1957)
- Gilles Servat, La Liberte Brille Dans La Nuit (Kalondour, 1975)
- Stuff Smith, Live in Paris 1965 (France's Concert, 1988)
- Toots Thielemans, Blues Pour Flirter (EmArcy/Universal, 1961)
- T-Bone Walker, I Want a Little Girl (Black and Blue, 1973)
- Ben Webster, Autumn Leaves (Futura, 1972)
- Bob Wilber & Dany Doriz, Memories of You (Black and Blue, 1996)
- John Williams, Negro Spirituals (Polydor, 1964)
- Chris Woods, Chris Meets Paris Meets Chris (Futura, 1973)
- Frank Wright, Shouting the Blues (Sun, 1977)
- Frank Wright, Kevin My Dear Son (Sun, 1979)
