= Gérard Badini =

- Also known as: Mr. Swing
- Born: 16 April 1931; Paris, France
- Died: 25 October 2025 (aged 94) Deauville, France

Gérard Badini (16 April 1931 – 25 October 2025), known as Mr. Swing, was a French jazz bandleader, composer, reedist and pianist.

== Life and career ==
Badini's father was an opera singer. Badini began playing professionally in the early 1950s, playing clarinet in New Orleans jazz-style ensembles with Michel Attenoux, Jimmy Archey, Lil Armstrong, Sidney Bechet, Bill Coleman, and Peanuts Holland. In 1955, he joined Claude Bolling's ensemble and then joined Bolling on a worldwide tour as members of Jack Diéval's orchestra. He switched principally to tenor sax beginning in 1958, continuing to work with Bolling as well as Roger Guérin and Geo Daly in the late 1950s. In the 1960s he worked with Alice Babs, Duke Ellington, Jean-Claude Naude, Cat Anderson, Paul Gonsalves, Jef Gilson, and François Guin.

He founded his own group, Swing Machine, in 1973, working in this group with Bobby Durham, Raymond Fol, Michel Gaudry, Helen Humes, Sonny Payne, and Sam Woodyard. From 1977 to 1979, Badini lived in New York City, performing there with Roy Eldridge, Major Holley, Oliver Jackson, Dick Katz, Clark Terry, Gerald Wiggins, and Reggie Workman. In 1984, he formed a new big-band ensemble, Super Swing Machine, which he led and played piano in through the late 1990s.

Badini died on 25 October 2025, at the age of 94.

== Bibliography ==
- André Clergeat and Barry Kernfeld, "Gérard Badini". The New Grove Dictionary of Jazz, 2nd edition.
