= François Guin =

French jazz musician and bandleader (born 1938)

François Guin (born May 18, 1938, in Contres) is a French jazz musician and bandleader.

Guin is a musical polymath, having learned violin, piano, voice, trombone, trumpet, and flute. As a trumpeter, he worked with Marc Laferrière in 1957, then switched to trombone to work with Raymond Fonsèque from 1959 to 1962. During this time he also played with Christian Chevallier, Jacques Denjean, Jacques Hélian, and Daniel Janin. Later in the 1960s he worked with Duke Ellington, Luis Fuentes, Michel Legrand, and Gerry Mulligan. In the 1970s, he played with Bill Coleman and Claude Bolling, and led his own ensemble, Four Bones, which was formed in 1967 and continued into the 1990s. Late in the 1970s he played in Les Petits Français with Moustache and Georges Brassens. In 1985 he took a position as a pedagogue at the Châteauroux conservatory, remaining there until 1997.
