= Jacques Hélian =

French orchestra conductor

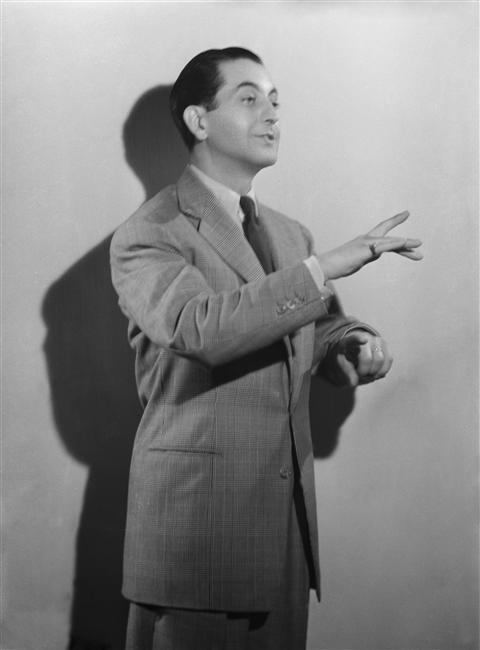
Jacques Hélian

Jacques Mikaël Der Mikaëlian better known as Jacques Hélian (7 June 1912 – 29 June 1986), was a famous French orchestra conductor for French music-hall.

== Biography ==
Born in Paris, to an Armenian father (descendant of Armenian bourgeoisie) and a French mother, at 16 he entered school of dentistry, but left his studies to pursue his love of music studying saxophone with Raymond Legrand (who later married Hélian's sister Marcelle). He commenced his musical career playing saxo alto, saxo baryton and clarinet in Roland Dorsay's orchestra and later in Jo Bouillon's and Ray Ventura's. He also performed in French live radio broadcasts releasing a number of recordings before the Second World War. Called for military service in 1939, he was captured and was a prisoner of war until March 1943, when he was freed for health reasons. After his release, he formed a small orchestra and performed on radio.

After the liberation of France, from Nazi occupation, Hélian gained huge popularity, replacing Raymond Legrand's fame. His tune "Fleur de Paris" (with lyrics from Maurice Vandair, and music by Henri Bourtayre) became a virtual "hymn of liberation" for France. All musical broadcasts would start and end with "Fleur de Paris".

Between 1945 and 1949, Hélian recorded more than 70 songs for Columbia Records, with C'est si bon in 1948 and Maître Pierre in 1949 gaining international fame. "Place Pigalle" was written by Alex Alstone and recorded by Maurice Chevalier in 1946 with Hélian's orchestra. He collaborated with composers Henri Bourtayre ("Chanteville", "La Marchina", "Soleil levant") and Loulou Gasté ("Le Porte-Bonheur", "Chica! Chica!", "Au Chili", "Les Pompiers du Mexique"). Hélian continued his highly followed radio performances and organized galas and musical tours throughout France with artists who gained a big following after appearing with his orchestra, including Francine Claudel, Zappy Max, Jo Charrier, Ginette Garcin, and others. In 1947, a singer, guitarist and composer known as Jean Marco (real name Jean Marcopoulos), quickly became the signature voice of Hélian's orchestra until his death in a road accident on 24 June 1953. Jean-Louis Tristan and Lou Darley succeeded Jean Marco and Claude Evelyne as lead singers.

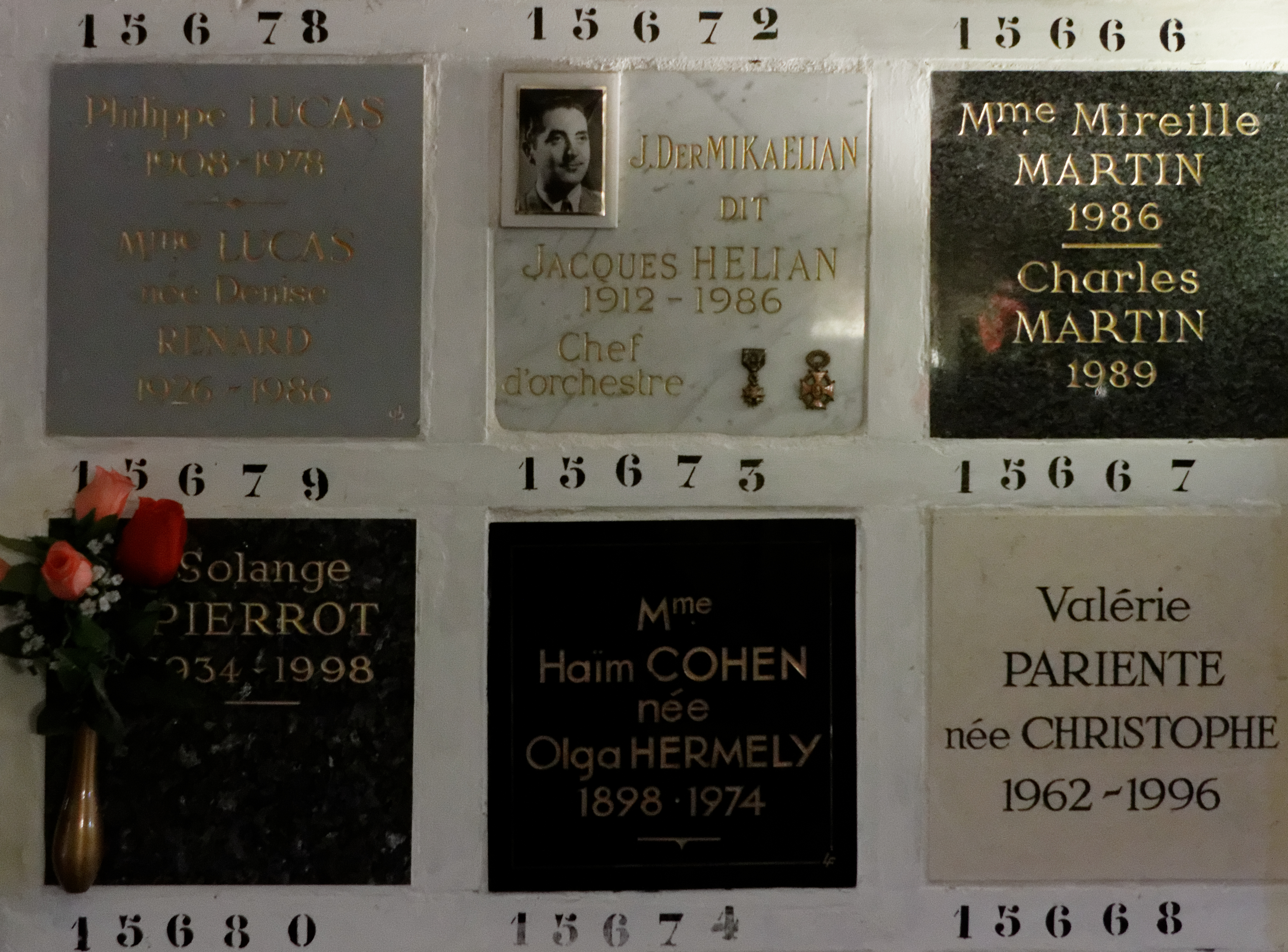

Hélian's "Étoile des neiges" sung by "The Hélians" female choir became one of his biggest successes ever, with a gold accreditation. In 1951, he received the Grand Prix du Disque from Académie Charles Cros for his song "Tout est tranquille".

Between 1949 and 1956, the best of French and European jazz artists appeared with Hélian's orchestra, including Christian Garros, Gérard Lévecque, André Paquinet, George Cloud, Fernand Verstraete, Marcel Bianchi, Pierre Gossez, Janot Morales, Fats Sadi, and from the other side of the Atlantic, jazzmen Ernie Royal, Al Mone, Bill Tamper, Don Byas, Kenny Clarke, and Sonny Grey, making his band one of the best known names of the "big bands" in Europe. His music was used in a number of films, including Cœur de coq (1946), Pigalle-Saint-Germain-des-Prés (1950), Musique en tête (1951) and Tambour battant (1952). The permanent orchestra's grande finale was on 15 March 1957.

Hélian continued to make appearances until the beginning of the 1980s, but with his audiences declining in numbers. He died in Paris on 29 June 1986, at the age of 74. His works are considered references for the best of the "big band" orchestras in French music and were featured as "Les Années Jacques Hélian" in the film Vive la vie.
