= Barry Kernfeld =

American musicologist and saxophonist (born 1950)

- Born: Barry Dean Kernfeld; August 11, 1950 (age 76); San Francisco, California, U.S.
- Education: UC Berkeley; UC Davis; Cornell
- Occupations: Jazz musicologist Jazz historian Author; Jazz music educator
- Spouse: Sally Ann McMurry
- Writing career
- Period: 1981–current
- Notable works: The New Grove Dictionary of Jazz
- Website: barrykernfeld.com

Barry Dean Kernfeld (born August 11, 1950) is an American musicologist and jazz saxophonist who has researched and published extensively about the history of jazz and the biographies of its musicians.

== Education ==
In 1968, Kernfeld enrolled at University of California, Berkeley; then, from April 1970 to September 1972, he focused on being a professional saxophonist. In October 1972, Kernfeld enrolled at the University of California, Davis, where, in 1975, he earned a Bachelor of Arts in musicology. From 1975 to 1981, he studied at Cornell University where he focused on jazz. Cornell awarded him a master's degree in 1978 and a Doctor of Philosophy degree 1981.

== Career ==
Kernfeld was the editor of the first and second editions of The New Grove Dictionary of Jazz, the largest jazz dictionary ever published. The first edition was published in 1988. Volume 1 had 670 pages and Volume 2 had 690.

In 2005, Kernfeld initiated a long-term project, transcribing and editing the contents of the Smithsonian Jazz Oral History Program. A number of lengthy interviews are now available at the institution's website. Also in 2005, Kernfeld became a staff archivist in the Historical Collections and Labor Archives within Special Collections at the Pennsylvania State University library. In 2012, he taught a writing course at Penn State, "American Jazz Masters in their Own Words."

Kernfeld spent a decade researching pop song piracy which culminated him publishing two books, one about fake books (2006) and the other a general survey (2011). (see book listings below)

== Selected published works ==
- Adderley, Coltrane, and Davis at the twilight of bebop: the search for melodic coherence (1958–59) (dissertation), Cornell University, 1981, OCLC 29685820
- Kernfeld, ed. (1988), The New Grove Dictionary of Jazz, Macmillan Press, OCLC 16804283
- Kernfeld; et al., eds. (1991), The Blackwell Guide to Recorded Jazz, Blackwell Publishing, OCLC 23017930
- What to Listen for in Jazz, Yale University Press, 1995, OCLC 30594666
- The New Grove Dictionary of Jazz (2nd ed.), Grove's Dictionaries Inc., 2001, OCLC 232175971
- The Story of Fake Books: Bootlegging Songs to Musicians, Scarecrow Press, 2006, OCLC 67922006
- Pop Song Piracy: Disobedient Music Distribution Since 1929, University of Chicago Press, 2011, OCLC 672300127
