= Claude Luter =

French jazz musician

- Born: Claude Luter; 23 July 1923
- Origin: Paris, France
- Died: 6 October 2006 (aged 83)
- Genres: Dixieland
- Occupations: Clarinetist; Saxophonist
- Instruments: Clarinet; Soprano saxophone
- Years active: 1940s–1990s
- Formerly of: Willie "The Lion" Smith Quartet; Claude Luter et Son Orchestre

Claude Luter (23 July 1923 – 6 October 2006) was a jazz clarinetist who doubled on soprano saxophone.

Luter was born and died in Paris. He began on trumpet, but switched to clarinet. He might be best known for being an accompanist to Sidney Bechet when he was in Paris, but he also worked with Barney Bigard and French writer and musician Boris Vian.

== Discography ==
- En Concert (06/16/2003)
- Puisque Vous Partez En Voyage (01/06/2003)
- Jazz Spirituals Disques Vogue SLVLX 426
- Parade Disques Vogue CLVLX 221
- a Bobino Disques Vogue SLVLX 414
- And His Orchestra Disques Vogue LVLX 156
