= Claude Bolling =

French jazz pianist and composer (1930–2020)

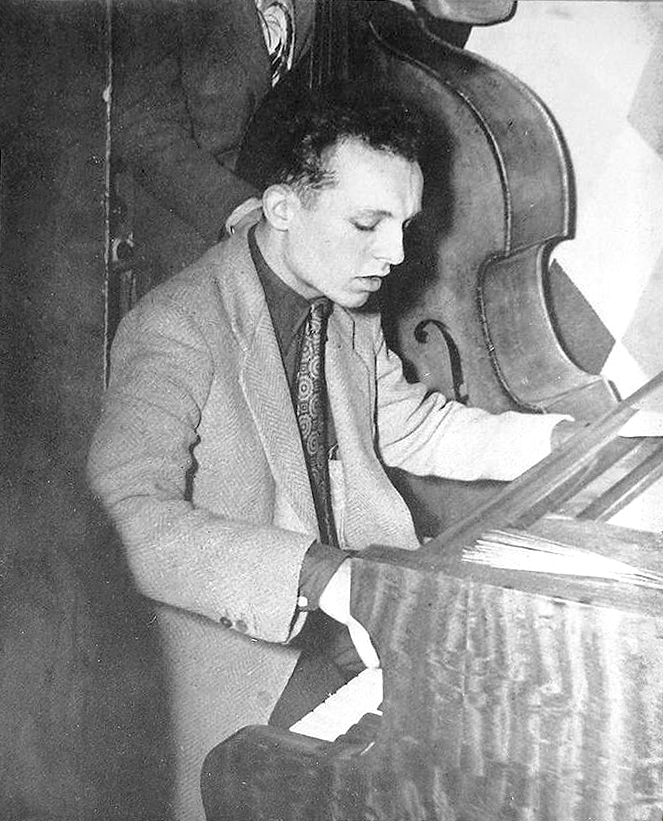
- Bolling in 1953

Background information
- Born: 10 April 1930; Cannes, France
- Died: 29 December 2020 (aged 90) Saint-Cloud, France
- Genre: Jazz
- Occupations: Musician, composer, arranger, actor
- Instrument: Piano
- Years active: 1944–2020
- Website: claude-bolling.com

Claude Bolling (10 April 1930 – 29 December 2020) was a French jazz pianist, composer, arranger, and occasional actor.

== Early life and education ==
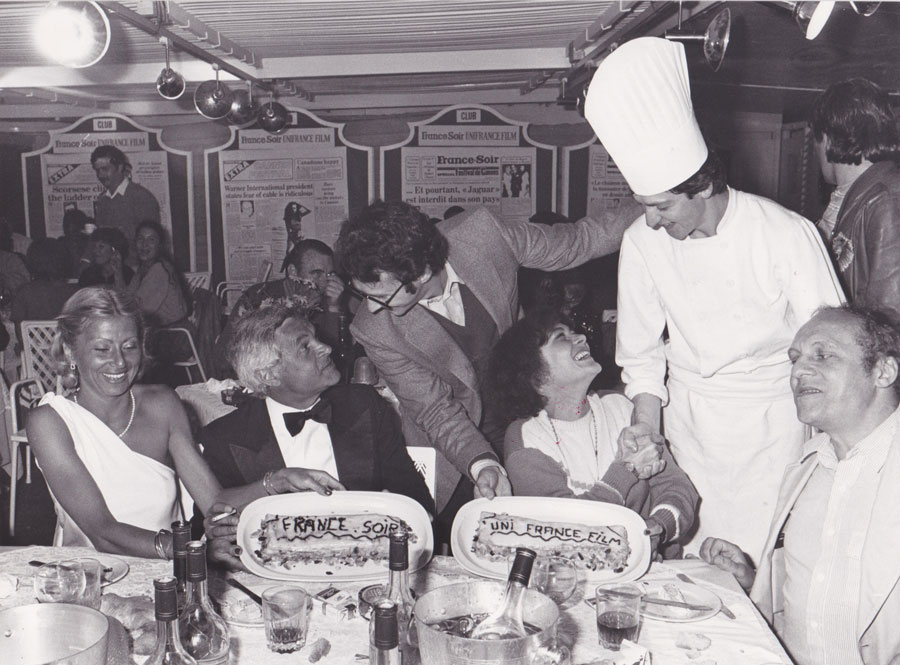
Bolling (far right) with Xavier Gélin (third from left) and Danièle Delorme (third from right), date unknown

He was born in Cannes, France, and studied at the Nice Conservatory, and then in Paris. A child prodigy, by the age of 14 he was playing jazz piano professionally, with Lionel Hampton, Roy Eldridge, and Kenny Clarke. Bolling's books on jazz technique show that he did not delve far beyond bebop into much avant-garde jazz. He was a major part of the traditional jazz revival in the late 1960s, and he became friends with Oscar Peterson.

== Career ==
He wrote music for over one hundred films, including a 1957 documentary about the Cannes Film Festival, and films such as The Hands of Orlac (1960), World in My Pocket (1961), Me and the Forty Year Old Man (1965), Atlantic Wall (1970), Borsalino (1970), To Catch a Spy (1971), Le Magnifique (1973), Enuff Is Enuff (J'ai mon voyage!), Borsalino & Co. (1974), Flic Story (1975), The Passengers (1977), Silver Bears (1978), California Suite (1978), Jigsaw (L'Homme en colère) (1979), The Awakening (1980), Willie & Phil (1980), Three Men to Kill (1980), The Bay Boy (1984), He Died with His Eyes Open (1985), Try This One for Size (1989) and Chance or Coincidence (1998).

Bolling was also noted for a series of "crossover" collaborations with classical musicians. His Suite for Flute and Jazz Piano Trio with Jean-Pierre Rampal, a mix of Baroque elegance with modern swing, has been a top seller for many years, and was followed up by other works in the same vein. It was particularly popular in the United States, at the top of the hit parade for two years after its release and on the Billboard top 40 for 530 weeks, roughly ten years.

Following his work with Rampal, Bolling went on to work with many other musicians, from different genres, including guitarist Alexandre Lagoya, violinist Pinchas Zukerman, trumpeter Maurice André, and cellist Yo-Yo Ma. He also worked with and performed tributes to many others, including Lionel Hampton, Duke Ellington, Stéphane Grappelli, Django Reinhardt, and Oscar Peterson.

Bolling was also notable as the composer of the Lucky Luke animated features Daisy Town (1971) and La Ballade des Dalton (1978).

== Discography ==
- French Jazz (Bally, 1956)
- Rolling with Bolling (Omega Disk, 1957)
- Joue Duke Ellington (Fontana, 1960)
- Jazzgang Amadeus Mozart (Philips, 1965)
- Original Ragtime (Philips, 1967)
- Original Boogie Woogie (Philips, 1968)
- Original Piano Blues (Philips, 1969)
- Original Jazz Classics Piano (Philips, 1970)
- Suite for Flute and Jazz Piano Trio with Jean-Pierre Rampal (Columbia Masterworks, 1975)
- With the Help of My Friends (Who's Who in Jazz, 1975)
- Concerto for Classic Guitar and Jazz Piano with Alexandre Lagoya (CBS, 1976)
- Suite for Violin and Jazz Piano (Columbia Masterworks, 1977)
- Jazz Gala 79 (America, 1979)
- Concerto for Classic Guitar and Jazz Piano with Angel Romero (Angel, 1980)
- Picnic Suite (CBS, 1980)
- Bolling: Toot Suite with Maurice Andre (CBS, 1981)
- Suite for Chamber Orchestra and Jazz Piano with Jean-Pierre Rampal (CBS, 1983)
- The Original Bolling Blues (Mercury, 1983)
- Suite for Cello and Jazz Piano Trio with Yo Yo Ma (CBS Masterworks, 1984)
- Jazz A La Française (CBS, 1984)
- Bolling [Band] plays Ellington [Music] (CBS, 1987)
- Bolling: Suite No. 2 for Flute and Jazz Piano Trio (CBS, 1987)
- Sonatas for Two Pianists (CBS, 1989)
- Warm Up the Band (Columbia, 1991)
- Cross Over U.S.A. (Milan, 1993)
- Enchanting Versailles: Strictly Classical (Milan, 1995)
- Suite for Flute and Piano Jazz Trio (Acte Préalable, 1999)
- Suite for Violin and Piano Jazz Trio (Acte Préalable, 1999)
- Suite for Cello and Piano Jazz Trio (Acte Préalable, 1999)
- Bolling Big Band: Gershwin In Swing (CAID, 2003)
- Bolling: Suite for Chamber Orchestra and Jazz Piano Trio (Mérida, 2011)
