= List of jazz pianists =

This is a list of musicians — alphabetized by last name — notable for playing or having played jazz piano. The piano has been an integral part of the jazz idiom since its inception, in both solo and ensemble settings. Its role is multifaceted due largely to the instrument's combined melodic, harmonic, and rhythmic capabilities.

== A ==
- Irving Aaronson (1895–1963)
- Anders Aarum (born 1974)
- Mike Abene (born 1942)
- Don Abney (1923–2000)
- Chris Abrahams (born 1961)
- Muhal Richard Abrams (1930–2017)
- John Adriano Acea (1917–1963)
- Bob Acri (1918–2013)
- Beegie Adair (1937–2022)
- Kei Akagi (born 1953)
- Toshiko Akiyoshi (born 1929)
- Erling Aksdal Jr. (born 1953)
- Joe Albany (1924–1988)
- Tony Aless (1921–1985)
- Charlie Alexander (1890–1970)
- Joey Alexander (born 2003)
- Monty Alexander (born 1944)
- Sinan Alimanović (born 1954)
- Esther Allan (1914–1985)
- Geri Allen (1957–2017)
- Steve Allen (1921–2000)
- Mose Allison (1927–2016)
- Fabian Almazan (born 1984)
- Mikhail Alperin (1956–2018)
- Helio Alves (born 1966)
- Jimmy Amadie (1937–2013)
- Albert Ammons (1907–1949)
- Franck Amsallem (born 1961)
- Chris Anderson (1926–2008)
- Bill Anschell
- Jim Aton (1925–2008)
- Ivar Antonsen (born 1946)
- Lil Hardin Armstrong (1898–1971)
- Dag Arnesen (born 1950)
- Lynne Arriale (born 1957)
- Georges Arvanitas (1931–2005)
- Takeshi Asai (born 1964)
- Roy Assaf (born 1982)
- Ehud Asherie (born 1979)
- Fahir Atakoğlu (born 1963)
- Eivind Austad (born 1973)
- Lovie Austin (1887–1972)
- Franck Avitabile (born 1971)

== B ==
- Rafig Babayev (1937–1994)
- Ilir Bajri (born 1969)
- Bob Baldwin (born 1960)
- Jon Balke (born 1955)
- Jon Ballantyne (born 1963)
- Louis Banks (born 1941)
- Patricia Barber (born 1956)
- Kenny Barron (born 1943)
- Bruce Barth (born 1958)
- Nik Bärtsch (born 1971)
- Count Basie (1904–1984)
- Dave Bass (born 1950)
- Django Bates (born 1960)
- Jonathan Batiste (born 1986)
- Stefano Battaglia (born 1965)
- Emily Bear (born 2001)
- Jim Beard (born 1960)
- John Beasley (born 1960)
- Gordon Beck (1935–2011)
- Burak Bedikyan
- Peter Beets (born 1971)
- Richie Beirach (1947–2026)
- Martin Bejerano
- Marco Benevento (born 1977)
- David Benoit (born 1953)
- Espen Berg (born 1983)
- Shelly Berg (born 1955)
- Borah Bergman (1933–2012)
- David Berkman (born 1958)
- Mark Berman
- Warren Bernhardt (1938–2022)
- Ove Alexander Billington (born 1979)
- Károly Binder (born 1956)
- Adam Birnbaum (born 1979)
- Michel Bisceglia (born 1970)
- Walter Bishop Jr. (1927–1998)
- Terje Bjørklund (1945–2024)
- Ketil Bjørnstad (born 1952)
- Miles Black (born 1966)
- Eubie Blake (1887–1983)
- Ran Blake (born 1935)
- Paul Bley (1932–2016)
- Carla Bley (1938–2023)
- Oddbjørn Blindheim (born 1944)
- Brynjulf Blix (born 1951)
- Jimmy Blythe (1901–1931)
- Stefano Bollani (born 1972)
- Claude Bolling (1930–2020)
- Rune Brøndbo (born 1968)
- Joe Bonner (1948–2014)
- Beryl Booker (1922–1978)
- James Booker (1939–1983)
- Michiel Borstlap (born 1966)
- Kris Bowers (born 1989)
- Ivan Božičević (born 1961)
- Joanne Brackeen (born 1938)
- David Braid (born 1975)
- Alan Broadbent (born 1947)
- Hadda Brooks (1916–2002)
- Alex Brown, (born 1987)
- Charles Brown (1922–1999)
- Cleo Brown (1907 or 1909–1995)
- Donald Brown (born 1954)
- Vernell Brown Jr. (born 1971)
- Brian Browne (1937–2018)
- Dave Brubeck (1920–2012)
- Rainer Brüninghaus (born 1949)
- Gary Brunotte (born 1948)
- Ray Bryant (1931–2011)
- Milt Buckner (1915–1977)
- Roy Budd (1947–1993)
- Alex Bugnon (born 1958)
- John Bunch (1921–2010)
- Markus Burger (born 1966)
- Ralph Burns (1922–2001)
- Dave Burrell (born 1944)
- Terry Burrus
- Joe Bushkin (1916–2004)
- Henry Butler (1949–2018)
- Jaki Byard (1922–1999)

== C ==
- George Cables (born 1944)
- Michael Cain (born 1966)
- Uri Caine (born 1956)
- Joey Calderazzo (born 1965)
- Carolina Calvache (born 1985)
- Michel Camilo (born 1954)
- John Campbell (born 1955)
- Valerie Capers (born 1935)
- Hoagy Carmichael (1899–1981)
- Judy Carmichael (born 1952)
- Barbara Carroll (1925–2017)
- Bill Carrothers (born 1964)
- Marc Cary (born 1967)
- Dick Cary (1916–1994)
- Page Cavanaugh (1922–2008)
- Joe Chambers (1954–2022)
- Bill Charlap (born 1966)
- Ray Charles (1930–2004)
- Jo-Yu Chen
- Cyrus Chestnut (born 1963)
- Billy Childs (born 1957)
- Joe Chindamo (born 1951)
- Herman Chittison (1908–1967)
- Eugen Cicero (1940–1997)
- Peter Cincotti (born 1983)
- Sarah Jane Cion
- Alan Clare (1921–1993)
- Sonny Clark (1931–1963)
- Mathias Claus (born 1956)
- Gerald Clayton (born 1984)
- John Cocuzzi (born 1964)
- Dolo Coker (1927–1983)
- Freddy Cole (1931–2020)
- Nat King Cole (1919–1965)
- John Colianni (1962–2023)
- George Colligan (born 1969)
- Alice Coltrane (1937–2007)
- Harry Connick Jr. (born 1967)
- Marc Copland (born 1948)
- Laurent Coq (born 1970)
- Chick Corea (1941–2021)
- Glenn Corneille (1970–2005)
- Eddie Costa (1930–1962)
- Johnny Costa (1922–1996)
- Tom Coster (born 1941)
- Sylvie Courvoisier (born 1968)
- Stanley Cowell (1941–2020)
- Neil Cowley (born 1972)
- Dan Cray (born 1977)
- Marilyn Crispell (born 1947)
- Connie Crothers (1941–2016)
- Laurent Cugny (born 1955)
- Brian Culbertson (born 1973)
- Jamie Cullum (born 1979)
- Christopher Culpo
- Bill Cunliffe (born 1956)
- Maestro Curtis (born 1956)

== D ==
- Franco D'Andrea (born 1941)
- Carsten Dahl (born 1967)
- Harald Dahlstrøm (born 1961)
- Albert Dailey (1939–1984)
- Eyolf Dale (born 1985)
- Tadd Dameron (1917–1965)
- Putney Dandridge (1902–1946)
- Harold Danko (born 1947)
- Kris Davis (born 1980)
- Ron Davis
- Walter Davis Jr. (1932–1990)
- Xavier Davis (born 1971)
- Blossom Dearie (1926–2009)
- Jack DeJohnette (1942–2025)
- Benoit Delbecq (born 1966)
- Eumir Deodato (born 1942)
- Dena DeRose (born 1966)
- Stuart de Silva (died 2015)
- Lorraine Desmarais (born 1956)
- Laurent de Wilde (born 1960)
- Neville Dickie (born 1937)
- Eldar Djangirov (born 1987)
- Steve Dobrogosz (born 1956)
- Niels Lan Doky (born 1963)
- João Donato (1934–2023)
- Dorothy Donegan (1924–1998)
- Armen Donelian (born 1950)
- Kit Downes (born 1986)
- Kenny Drew (1928–1993)
- Kenny Drew Jr. (1958–2014)
- George Duke (1946–2013)
- Jozef Dumoulin (born 1975)
- Hank Duncan (1894–1968)

== E ==
- Geoff Eales (born 1951)
- John Eaton (1934–2026)
- Marte Eberson (born 1987)
- Luiz Eça (1936–1992)
- Rachel Eckroth (born 1976)
- Joanna Eden
- Peter Edwards
- Taylor Eigsti (born 1984)
- Eliane Elias (born 1960)
- Duke Ellington (1899–1974)
- Bobby Enriquez (1943–1996)
- Ari Erev born 1956
- Aydın Esen (born 1962)
- Bill Evans (1929–1980)
- Gil Evans (1912–1988)
- Orrin Evans (born 1975)
- Don Ewell (1916–1983)

== F ==
- Antonio Faraò (born 1965)
- Victor Feldman (1934–1987)
- Russell Ferrante (born 1952)
- Manfredo Fest (1936–1999)
- Bobby Few (1935–2021)
- Kevin Field
- Svein Finnerud (1945–2000)
- Clare Fischer (1928–2012)
- Frode Fjellheim (born 1959)
- Tommy Flanagan (1930–2001)
- Bob Florence (1932–2008)
- Roberto Fonseca (born 1975)
- Joel Forrester (born 1946)
- Sullivan Fortner (born 1986)
- Herman Foster (1928–1999)
- Ray Foxley (1928–2002)
- Harmen Fraanje (born 1976)
- Rodney Franklin (born 1958)
- Ming Freeman (born 1963)
- Russ Freeman (1926–2002)
- Sharon Freeman
- Don Friedman (1935–2016)
- David Frishberg (1933–2021)
- Satoko Fujii (born 1958)
- Ryo Fukui (1948–2016)
- Larry Fuller (born 1965)
- Arve Furset (born 1964)
- Joel Futterman (born 1946)

== G ==
- Hal Galper (1938–2025)
- Salman Gambarov (born 1959)
- Laszlo Gardony (born 1956)
- Red Garland (1923–1984)
- Erroll Garner (1921–1977)
- Michael Garrick (1933–2011)
- Giorgio Gaslini (1929–2014)
- Charles Gayle (1939–2023)
- Seppe Gebruers (born 1990)
- Chris Geith
- Leo Genovese (born 1979)
- George Gershwin (1898–1937)
- Lafayette Gilchrist (born 1967)
- Jef Gilson (1926–1912)
- Anne-Marie Giørtz (born 1958)
- Ole Henrik Giørtz (born 1955)
- Egberto Gismonti (born 1947)
- Robert Glasper (born 1978)
- Aaron Goldberg (born 1974)
- Larry Goldings (born 1968)
- Gil Goldstein (born 1950)
- Rubén González (1919–2003)
- Federico González Peña (born 1966)
- Gordon Goodwin (born 1954)
- Markus Gottschlich
- Haakon Graf (born 1955)
- Michel Graillier (1946–2003)
- Tom Grant (born 1946)
- Benny Green (born 1963)
- Jesse Green (born 1973)
- Burton Greene (1937–2021)
- Stan Greig (1930–2012)
- Lionel Grigson (1942–1994)
- Danny Grissett (born 1975)
- Don Grolnick (1948–1996)
- Richard Grossman (1937–1992)
- George Gruntz (1932–2013)
- Dave Grusin (born 1934)
- Vince Guaraldi (1928–1976)
- Johnny Guarnieri (1917–1985)
- Friedrich Gulda (1930–2000)
- Onaje Allan Gumbs (1949–2020)
- Tord Gustavsen (born 1970)

== H ==
- Al Haig (1924–1982)
- Sadik Hakim (1919–1983)
- Randy Halberstadt (born 1953)
- Bengt Hallberg (1932–2013)
- Tigran Hamasyan (born 1987)
- Jan Hammer (born 1948)
- Lionel Hampton (1908–2002)
- Herbie Hancock (born 1940)
- George Handy (1920–1997)
- Paul Hanmer (born 1961)
- Roland Hanna (1932–2002)
- Buster Harding (1912–1965)
- Ichiko Hashimoto (born 1952)
- Barry Harris (1929–2021)
- Gene Harris (1933–2000)
- Cass Harrison
- Hampton Hawes (1928–1977)
- Alexander Hawkins (born 1981)
- Edgar Hayes (1904–1979)
- Vahagn Hayrapetyan (born 1968)
- Kevin Hays (born 1968)
- David Hazeltine (born 1958)
- Pablo Held (born 1986)
- Anke Helfrich (born 1966)
- Tamir Hendelman (born 1971)
- Bobby Henderson (1910–1969)
- Fletcher Henderson (1897–1952)
- Horace Henderson (1904–1988)
- Yaron Herman (born 1981)
- Oscar Hernandez (born 1954)
- Fred Hersch (born 1955)
- Nitai Hershkovits (born 1988)
- Svein Olav Herstad (born 1969)
- Antoine Hervé (born 1959)
- Frank Hewitt (1935–2002)
- Eddie Heywood (1915–1989)
- John Hicks (1941–2006)
- Eddie Higgins (1932–2009)
- Skinny Hightower (born 1985)
- Andrew Hill (1931–2007)
- Lisa Hilton
- Earl Hines (1903–1983)
- Jutta Hipp (1925–2003)
- Art Hirahara (born 1971)
- Laurence Hobgood (born 1959)
- Art Hodes (1904–1993)
- Jan Gunnar Hoff (born 1958)
- Jools Holland (born 1958)
- Scott Holman (born 1954)
- Mike Holober (born 1957)
- Bertha Hope (born 1936)
- Elmo Hope (1923–1967)
- Glenn Horiuchi (1955–2000)
- Shirley Horn (1934–2005)
- Wayne Horvitz (born 1955)
- Julia Hülsmann (born 1968)
- Steve Hunt (born 1958)
- Per Husby (born 1949)
- Dick Hyman (born 1927)

== I ==
- Adrián Iaies (born 1960)
- Hasaan Ibn Ali (1931–1980)
- Abdullah Ibrahim (1934–2026)
- Nikki Iles (born 1963)
- Masaru Imada (1932–2025)
- Keith Ingham (1942–2026)
- Weldon Irvine (1943–2002)
- Robert Irving III (born 1953)
- Einar Iversen (1930–2019)
- Ethan Iverson (born 1973)
- Vijay Iyer (born 1973)

== J ==
- D. D. Jackson (born 1967)
- Christian Jacob (born 1958)
- Pim Jacobs (1934–1996)
- Pete Jacobsen (1950–2002)
- Ahmad Jamal (1930–2023)
- Bob James (born 1939)
- Jon Jang (born 1954)
- Lars Jansson (born 1951)
- Keith Jarrett (born 1945)
- Jane Jarvis (1915–2010)
- Alain Jean-Marie (born 1945)
- Antonio Carlos Jobim (1927–1994)
- Jan Johansson (1931–1968)
- Dink Johnson (1892–1954)
- James P. Johnson (1894–1955)
- Pete Johnson (1904–1967)
- Pete Jolly (1932–2004)
- Hank Jones (1918–2010)
- Mike Jones (born 1962)
- Norah Jones (born 1979)
- Oliver Jones (1934–2026)
- Richard M. Jones (1892–1945)
- Scott Joplin (1868–1917)
- Duke Jordan (1922–2006)
- Bradley Joseph (born 1965)
- Julian Joseph (born 1966)
- Hans Otto Jung (1920–2009)

== K ==
- Michael Kaeshammer (born 1977)
- Maria Kannegaard (born 1970)
- Egil Kapstad (1940–2017)
- Nikolai Kapustin (1937–2020)
- Fumio Karashima (1948–2017)
- Kjell Karlsen (1931–2020)
- Jacob Karlzon (born 1970)
- Gregg Karukas (born 1956)
- Eyran Katsenelenbogen (born 1965)
- Bruce Katz (born 1952)
- Dick Katz (1924–2009)
- Cab Kaye (1921–2000)
- Yakov Kazyansky (born 1948)
- Geoff Keezer (born 1970)
- Roger Kellaway (born 1939)
- Sue Keller (born 1952)
- Peck Kelley (1898–1980)
- Brian Kellock (1962–2025)
- Wynton Kelly (1931–1971)
- Rodney Kendrick (born 1960)
- Ray Kennedy (1957–2015)
- Stan Kenton (1911–1979)
- Brooks Kerr (1951–2018)
- David Kikoski (born 1961)
- Himiko Kikuchi (born 1953)
- Masabumi Kikuchi (1939–2015)
- Jeanette Kimball (1906–2001)
- Frank Kimbrough (1956–2020)
- Kenny Kirkland (1955–1998)
- Simon Kiselicki (born 1974)
- Rune Klakegg (born 1958)
- Guillermo Klein (born 1969)
- Jacques Klein (1930–1982)
- Dan Knight (born 1953)
- Peter Knudsen (born 1980)
- Ron Kobayashi
- Per Kolstad (born 1953)
- Krzysztof Komeda (1931–1969)
- Olga Konkova (born 1969)
- Ted Kooshian (born 1961)
- Steve Koven
- Diana Krall (born 1964)
- Mark Kramer (born 1945)
- Knut Kristiansen (born 1946)
- Joachim Kühn (born 1944)
- Steve Kuhn (born 1938)
- Billy Kyle (1914–1966)

== L ==
- Donald Lambert (1904–1962)
- Art Lande (born 1947)
- Geir Langslet (born 1956)
- Ellis Larkins (1923–2002)
- Morten Gunnar Larsen (born 1955)
- Anja Lauvdal (born 1987)
- Andy LaVerne (born 1947)
- John Law (born 1961)
- Hugh Lawson (1935–1997)
- Mike LeDonne (born 1956)
- Michel Legrand (1932–2019)
- Peter Lemer (born 1942)
- Brian Lemon (1937–2014)
- Gianni Lenoci (1963–2019)
- Uli Lenz (born 1955)
- Indra Lesmana (born 1966)
- Milcho Leviev (1937–2019)
- Mark Levine (1938–2022)
- Lou Levy (1928–2001)
- John Lewis (1920–2001)
- Meade Lux Lewis (1905–1964)
- Ramsey Lewis (1935–2022)
- Steve Lewis (1896 – c. 1941)
- Helge Lien (born 1975)
- Kirk Lightsey (born 1937)
- Helge Lilletvedt (born 1960)
- Nils Lindberg (1933–2022)
- Jason Lindner (born 1973)
- Ivan Lins (born 1945)
- Mike Lipskin (born 1952)
- Mike Longo (1937–2020)
- Jeff Lorber (born 1952)
- Russ Lossing (born 1960)
- Jacques Loussier (1934–2019)
- Andreas Stensland Løwe (born 1983)
- Bernard Lubat (born 1945)
- Erik van der Luijt (born 1970)
- Jan Lundgren (born 1966)
- Bobby Lyle (born 1944)
- Harold López-Nussa (born 1983)

== M ==
- Harold Mabern (1936–2019)
- Earl MacDonald (born 1970)
- Dave Mackay (1932–2020)
- Shai Maestro (born 1987)
- Roberto Magris (born 1959)
- Adam Makowicz (born 1940)
- John Malachi (1919–1987)
- Junior Mance (1928–2021)
- Henry Mancini (1924–1994)
- Emanuele Maniscalco (born 1983)
- Frank Mantooth (1947–2004)
- Fate Marable (1890–1947)
- Tânia Maria (born 1948)
- César Camargo Mariano (born 1943)
- Phil Markowitz (born 1952)
- Jon Marks (1947–2007)
- Michael "Dodo" Marmarosa (1925–2002)
- Denman Maroney (born 1949)
- André Marques (born 1975)
- Ellis Marsalis Jr. (1934–2020)
- Peter Martin (born 1970)
- Ronnie Mathews (1935–2008)
- Keiko Matsui (born 1961)
- Takashi Matsunaga (born 1986)
- David Matthews (born 1942)
- Leo Mathisen (1906–1969)
- Rebeca Mauleon (born 1962)
- Jon Mayer (born 1938)
- Bill Mays (born 1944)
- Lyle Mays (1953–2020)
- Barney McAll (born 1966)
- John McAll (born 1960)
- Les McCann (1935–2023)
- Tom McClung (1957–2017)
- Andrew McCormack (born 1978)
- Dave McKenna (1930–2008)
- Carlos McKinney (born 1978)
- Jim McNeely (born 1949)
- Marian McPartland (1918–2013)
- Jay McShann (1916–2006)
- John Medeski (born 1965)
- John Mehegan (1920–1984)
- Brad Mehldau (born 1970)
- Myra Melford (born 1957)
- Mike Melvoin (1937–2012)
- Sergio Mendes (1941–2024)
- Misha Mengelberg (1935–2017)
- Oreste Migliaccio (1882–1973)
- Max Miller (1911–1985)
- Mulgrew Miller (1955–2013)
- Andy Milne (born 1969)
- Charles Mingus (1922–1979)
- Alain Mion (born 1947)
- Giovanni Mirabassi (born 1970)
- Matt Mitchell (born 1975)
- Bernt Moen (born 1974)
- Øystein Moen (born 1980)
- Paul Moer (1916–2010)
- Moses Taiwa Molelekwa (1973–2001)
- Thelonious Monk (1917–1982)
- Jeremy Monteiro (born 1960)
- Buddy Montgomery (1930–2009)
- Tete Montoliu (1933–1997)
- Dudley Moore (1935–2002)
- Phil Moore (1918–1987)
- Consuela Lee Moorehead (1927–2010)
- Jason Moran (born 1975)
- Pat Moran McCoy (born 1934)
- Shōtarō Moriyasu (1924–1955)
- Jelly Roll Morton (1890–1941)
- Sal Mosca (1927–2007)
- Bennie Moten (1894–1935)
- Leszek Możdżer (born 1971)
- Bheki Mseleku (1955–2008)
- Carli Muñoz (born 1948)
- Bob Murphy (1945–2015)
- Romano Mussolini (1927–2006)
- Vagif Mustafazadeh (1940–1979)
- Aziza Mustafazadeh (born 1969)

== N ==
- Simon Nabatov (born 1959)
- Armen Nalbandian (born 1978)
- Marty Napoleon (1921–2015)
- Josh Nelson (born 1978)
- Jef Neve (born 1977)
- Phineas Newborn Jr. (1931–1990)
- David Newton (born 1958)
- Herbie Nichols (1919–1963)
- Dan Nimmer (born 1982)
- Liam Noble (born 1968)
- Mike Nock (born 1940)
- Victor Noriega (born 1978)
- Walter Norris (1927–2011)
- Shahin Novrasli (born 1977)

== O ==
- Hod O'Brien (1936–2016)
- Bill O'Connell (born 1953)
- Arturo O'Farrill (born 1961)
- Harold O'Neal (born 1981)
- Johnny O'Neal (born 1956)
- Jørn Øien (born 1968)
- Junko Onishi (born 1967)
- Piotr Orzechowski (born 1990)
- Makoto Ozone (born 1961)

== P ==
- Marty Paich (1925–1995)
- Eddie Palmieri (1936—2025)
- Tiny Parham (1900–1943)
- Johnny Parker (1929–2010)
- Aaron Parks (born 1983)
- Horace Parlan (1931–2017)
- Avery Parrish (1917–1959)
- Hermeto Pascoal (1936–2025)
- Alan Pasqua (born 1952)
- Ben Paterson (born 1982)
- Raimonds Pauls (born 1936)
- Charlie Peacock (born 1956)
- Duke Pearson (1932–1980)
- Eivin One Pedersen (1956–2012)
- César Pedroso (1946–2022)
- Bernard Peiffer (1922–1976)
- Kim Pensyl
- Austin Peralta (1990–2012)
- Marc Perrenoud (born 1981)
- Luis Perdomo (born 1971)
- Danilo Pérez (born 1966)
- Carl Perkins (1928–1958)
- Oscar Peterson (1925–2007)
- Umberto Petrin (born 1960)
- Michel Petrucciani (1962–1999)
- Willie Pickens (1931–2017)
- Enrico Pieranunzi (born 1949)
- Billie Pierce (1907–1974)
- Nat Pierce (1925–1992)
- Roberta Piket (born 1966)
- Jean-Michel Pilc (born 1960)
- Mika Pohjola (born 1971)
- Terry Pollard (1931–2009)
- Paul Posnak
- Bud Powell (1924–1966)
- Mel Powell (1923–1998)
- Richie Powell (1931–1956)
- Roy Powell (born 1965)
- André Previn (1929–2019)
- Sammy Price (1908–1992)
- Clarence Profit (1912–1944)
- John Proulx
- Don Pullen (1941–1995)
- Kym Purling (born 1972)
- Alton Purnell (1911–1987)

== Q ==
- Andy Quin (born 1960)
- Morten Qvenild (born 1978)

== R ==
- Sun Ra (1914–1993)
- Johnny Răducanu (1931–2011)
- Ziad Rahbani (born 1956)
- Zoe Rahman (born 1971)
- Eldbjørg Raknes (born 1970)
- Iiro Rantala (born 1970)
- Jan Randall (born 1952)
- Don Randi (born 1937)
- Ray Reach (1948–2026)
- Dana Reason
- Jason Rebello (born 1969)
- Freddie Redd (1928–2021)
- Eric Reed (born 1970)
- Henri Renaud (1925–2002)
- Jason Reolon (born 1976)
- Joshua Rich (born 1962)
- Eve Risser (born 1982)
- Sam Rivers (1923–2011)
- Luckey Roberts (1887–1968)
- Marcus Roberts (born 1963)
- J. Russell Robinson (1892–1963)
- Alfredo Rodríguez (1936–2005)
- Alfredo Rodríguez (born 1985)
- Bryce Rohde (1923–2016)
- Matt Rollings
- Ted Rosenthal (born 1959)
- Renee Rosnes (born 1962)
- Florian Ross (born 1972)
- Scott Routenberg (born 1978)
- Jimmy Rowles (1918–1996)
- Gonzalo Rubalcaba (born 1963)
- Hilton Ruiz (1952–2006)
- Otmaro Ruíz (born 1964)
- Patrice Rushen (born 1954)
- Luis Russell (1902–1963)
- George Russell (1923–2009)

== S ==
- Jacob Sacks
- Philippe Saisse (born 1957)
- Joe Sample (1939–2014)
- Arturo Sandoval (born 1949)
- Nick Sanders
- Christian Sands (born 1989)
- Jovino Santos-Neto (born 1954)
- Michel Sardaby (1935–2023)
- Bernardo Sassetti (born 1970)
- Masahiko Satoh (born 1941)
- Gaea Schell (born 1975)
- Lalo Schifrin (1932–2025)
- Alexander von Schlippenbach (born 1938)
- Rob Schneiderman (born 1957)
- Carl Schroeder
- Diane Schuur (born 1953)
- Irène Schweizer (1941–2024)
- Hazel Scott (1920–1981)
- Stephen Scott (born 1969)
- Bernie Senensky (born 1944)
- George Shearing (1919–2011)
- John Sheridan (1946–2021)
- Jake Sherman
- Yutaka Shiina (born 1964)
- Matthew Shipp (born 1960)
- Ayako Shirasaki (born 1963)
- Don Shirley (1927–2013)
- Travis Shook (born 1969)
- Bobby Short (1924–2005)
- Ofir Shwartz (born 1979)
- Ben Sidran (born 1943)
- Horace Silver (1928–2014)
- Gwilym Simcock (born 1981)
- Norman Simmons (1929–2021)
- Edward Simon (born 1969)
- Nina Simone (1933–2003)
- Ruslan Sirota (born 1980)
- Reidar Skår (born 1964)
- Erlend Skomsvoll (born 1969)
- Baard Slagsvold (born 1963)
- Erlend Slettevoll (born 1981)
- Cliff Smalls (1918–2008)
- Clarence "Pinetop" Smith (1904–1929)
- Paul Smith (1922–2013)
- Sonelius Smith (born 1942)
- Willie "The Lion" Smith (1897–1973)
- Martial Solal (1927–2024)
- Jess Stacy (1904–1994)
- Bobo Stenson (born 1944)
- Tommy Stewart (born 1939)
- Vigleik Storaas (born 1963)
- Ståle Storløkken (born 1969)
- Geoff Stradling (born 1955)
- Charley Straight (1891–1940)
- Billy Strayhorn (1915–1967)
- Frank Strazzeri (1930–2014)
- Dana Suesse (1909–1987)
- Joe Sullivan (1906–1971)
- Helen Sung
- Ralph Sutton (1922–2001)
- Esbjörn Svensson (1964–2008)
- Hermann Szobel (born 1958)

== T ==
- Craig Taborn (born 1970)
- Aki Takase (born 1948)
- Ayumi Tanaka (born 1986)
- Israel Tanenbaum (born 1961)
- Horace Tapscott (1934–1999)
- Art Tatum (1909–1956)
- Billy Taylor (1921–2010)
- Cecil Taylor (1929–2018)
- John Taylor (1942–2015)
- Richard Tee (1943–1993)
- Jacky Terrasson (born 1965)
- Pat Thomas (born 1960)
- Don Thompson (born 1940)
- Butch Thompson (1943–2022)
- Sir Charles Thompson (1918–2016)
- Claude Thornhill (1909–1965)
- Bobby Timmons (1935–1974)
- Keith Tippett (1947–2020)
- Billy Tipton (1914–1989)
- Paul Tobey (born 1962)
- Tim Tobias (1952–2006)
- Lee Tomboulian (born 1960)
- Kevin Toney (1953–2024)
- Allen Toussaint (1938–2015)
- Stan Tracey (1926–2013)
- Lennie Tristano (1919–1978)
- Baptiste Trotignon (born 1974)
- Terry Trotter (born 1940)
- Bobby Troup (1918–1999)
- Alexander Tsfasman (1906–1971)
- Joe Turner (1907–1990)
- Dick Twardzik (1931–1955)
- McCoy Tyner (1938–2020)

== U ==
- Hiromi Uehara (born 1979)
- Andreas Ulvo (born 1983)
- René Urtreger (1934–2026)

== V ==
- Bebo Valdés (1918–2013)
- Chucho Valdés (born 1941)
- Jose Valdes (born 1957)
- Manuel Valera (born 1980)
- Ramón Valle (born 1964)
- Colin Vallon (born 1980)
- Fred Van Hove (1937–2022)
- Maurice Vander (1929–2017)
- Johnny Varro (born 1930)
- Tom Vaughn (1936–2011)
- Donald Vega (born 1974)
- Glauco Venier (born 1962)
- David Virelles (born 1983)
- Dick Voynow (c. 1900–1944)

== W ==
- Mal Waldron (1925–2002)
- Fats Waller (1904–1943)
- Per Henrik Wallin (1946–2005)
- George Wallington (1924–1993)
- Christian Wallumrød (born 1971)
- David Wallumrød (born 1977)
- Cedar Walton (1934–2013)
- Dominik Wania (born 1981)
- Roosevelt Wardell (1934–1999)
- Huw Warren (born 1962)
- Earl Washington (1921–1975)
- Fred Washington (1887–1962)
- Marcin Wasilewski (born 1975)
- Trevor Watkis (born 1971)
- Teddy Weatherford (1903–1945)
- Florian Weber (born 1977)
- Vince Weber (1953–2020)
- Gerry Weil (1939–2024)
- Michael Weiss (born 1958)
- Dick Wellstood (1927–1987)
- Kenny Werner (born 1951)
- Bugge Wesseltoft (born 1964)
- Mike Westbrook (1936–2026)
- Randy Weston (1926–2018)
- Gerald Wiggins (1922–2008)
- Håvard Wiik (born 1975)
- Clarence Williams (1898–1965)
- James Williams (1951–2004)
- Jessica Williams (1948–2022)
- John Williams (1929–2018)
- Mary Lou Williams (1910–1981)
- Valdo Williams (1928–2010)
- Claude Williamson (1926–2016)
- Larry Willis (1942–2019)
- Buster Wilson (1897–1949)
- Garland Wilson (1909–1954)
- Jack Wilson (1936–2007)
- Teddy Wilson (1912–1986)
- Mike Wofford (1938–2025)
- Michael Wolff (born 1952)
- Michael Wollny (born 1978)
- John Wright (1934–2017)
- Richard Wyands (1928–2019)
- Howard Wyeth (1944–1996)

== Y ==
- Tsuyoshi Yamamoto (born 1948)
- Chihiro Yamanaka (born 1976)
- Yōsuke Yamashita (born 1942)
- Jimmy Yancey (1894 or 1901–1951)
- Alon Yavnai (born 1969)
- Andile Yenana (born 1968)
- Yitzhak Yedid (born 1971)
- John Young (1922–2008)

== Z ==
- Rachel Z (born 1972)
- Peter Zak (born 1965)
- Glenn Zaleski (born 1987/1988)
- Marcelo Zarvos (born 1969)
- Josef Zawinul (1932–2007)
- Denny Zeitlin (born 1938)
- Pablo Ziegler (born 1944)
- Bojan Zulfikarpašić (born 1968)
- Axel Zwingenberger (born 1955)
