= Takeshi =

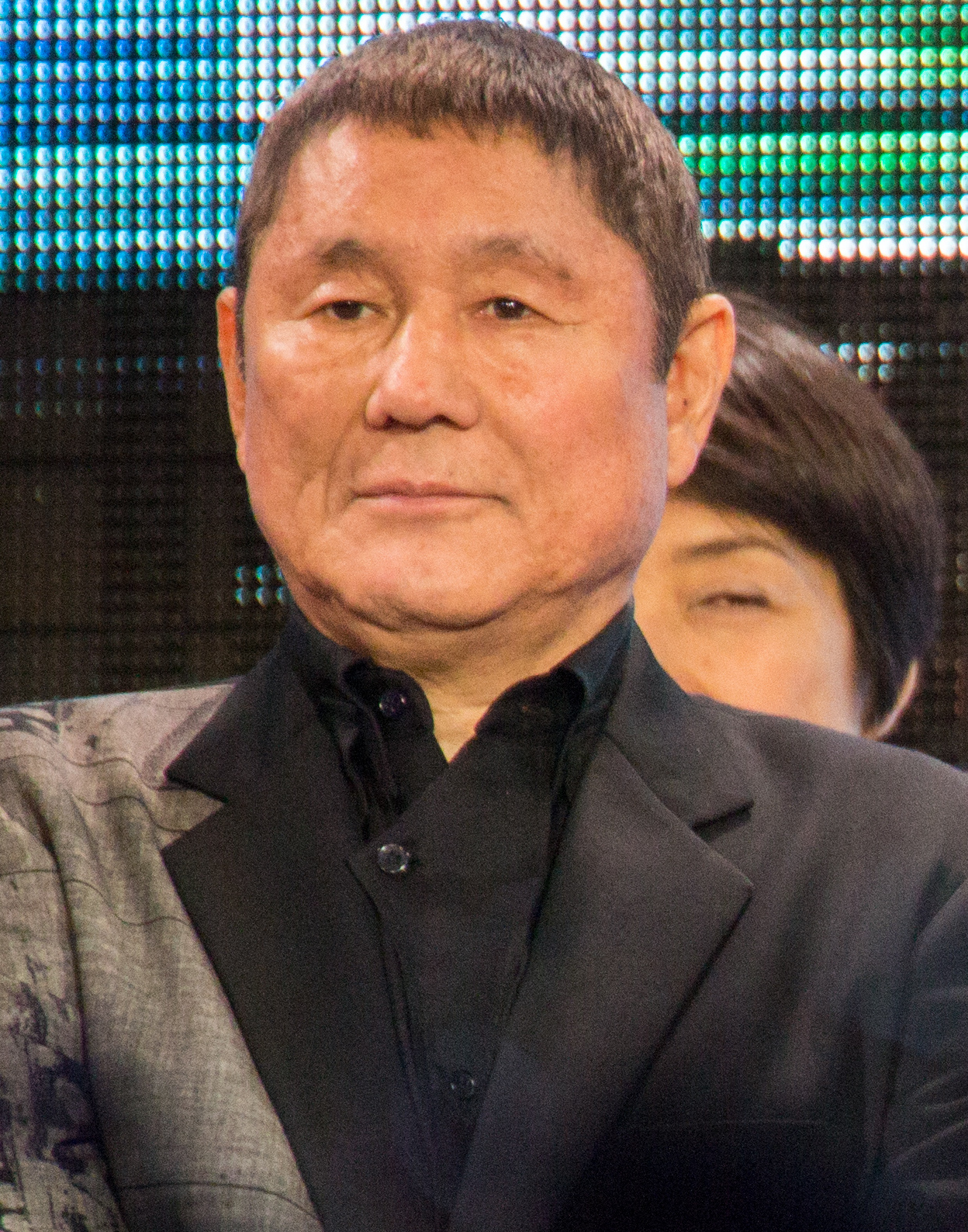
- Takeshi Kitano, Japanese comedian, actor, and film director
- Pronunciation: Japanese: [takeꜜɕi]
- Gender: Male

Origin
- Origin: Japanese
- Meaning: Different meanings depending on the kanji used

Takeshi (たけし in hiragana or タケシ in katakana) is a masculine Japanese given name.

== Written forms ==
Forms in kanji can include:

- 武, "warrior"
- 毅, "strong"
- 猛, "fierce"
- 健, "healthy"
- 剛, "sturdy"
- 崇, "exalt"
- 彪, "spotted"
- 威, "intimidate"
- 壮, "robust"
- 丈, "length"
- 雄, "masculine"
- 豪, "overpowering"
- 武史, "warrior, history"
- 武士, "warrior, gentleman"
- 健史, "healthy, history"
- 猛司, "fierce, director"
- 剛士, "sturdy, gentleman"
- 健士, "healthy, gentleman"
- 武志, "warrior, "intention"
- 丈史, "length, history"
- 剛始, "sturdy, commence"
- 猛司, "fierce, director"
- 勇志, "courage, intention"
- 雄志, "masculine, intention"
- 猛士, "fierce, gentleman"
- 岳志, "peak, intention"
- 剛志, "sturdy, intention"
- 岳史, "peak, history"

== People with the name ==
- Takeshi Abo (阿保 剛; born 1973), Japanese video game composer
- Takeshi Aikoh (愛甲 猛; born 1962), Japanese retired Nippon Professional Baseball player
- Takeshi Akiba (秋葉 武士; born 1944), Japanese ice hockey player
- Takeshi Akiba (秋葉 武士; born 1944), Japanese ice hockey player
- Takeshi Amemiya (雨宮 健; 1935–2026), Japanese economist and academic
- Takeshi Aoki (青木 剛; born 1982), Japanese football player
- Takeshi Aono (baseball) (青野 毅; born 1983), Japanese former professional baseball infielder
- Takeshi Aono (青野 武; 1936–2012), Japanese voice actor
- Takeshi Aragaki (新垣 武; 1956–2022), Japanese professional Go player
- Takeshi Araki (荒木 武; 1916–1994), Japanese mayor of Hiroshima from 1975 to 1991
- Takeshi Asai (born 1964), Japanese jazz pianist, composer, producer and educator
- Takeshi Azuma (東 毅; born 1953), Japanese ice hockey player
- Takeshi Caesar (シーザー 武志; born 1955), Japanese actor and retired kickboxer
- Takeshi Ebisawa (海老沢 武; born 1964), Japanese drug smuggler and arms dealer
- Takeshi Fuji (藤 猛; born 1940), Hawaiian-born Japanese former professional boxer
- Takeshi Fujii (藤井 猛; born 1970), Japanese shogi player
- Takeshi Fujiwara (藤原 崇; born 1983), Japanese politician
- Takeshi Fukuda (福田 岳志), Japanese director of photography
- Takeshi Fukunaga (福永 壮志; born 1982), Japanese filmmaker and director
- Takeshi Furukawa (古川 毅), Japanese-American composer and conductor
- Takeshi Furusawa (古澤 健; born 1972), Japanese film director and screenwriter
- Takeshi Hagiwara (萩原 毅; born 1937), Japanese sailor
- Takeshi Hamada (濱田 武; born 1982), Japanese former football player
- Takeshi Handa (半田 武嗣; born 1985), Japanese former football player
- Takeshi Hasegawa (長谷川 武; born 1984), Japanese basketball player
- Takeshi Hayama (葉山 たけし; born 1958), Japanese musical arranger and guitarist
- Takeshi Hayashida (林田 彪; born 1944), Japanese former politician
- Takeshi Hidaka (日高 剛; born 1977), Japanese baseball player
- Takeshi Hino (日野 剛志; born 1990), Japanese international rugby union player
- Takeshi Hirayama (平山 雄; 1923–1995), Japanese cancer epidemiologist and anti-tobacco activist
- Takeshi Honda (本田 武史; born 1981), Japanese figure skater
- Takeshi Honda (animator) (本田 雄; born 1968), Japanese animator
- Takeshi Horikoshi (堀越 武; born 1943), Japanese weightlifter
- Takeshi Hosaka (保坂 武; born 1945), Japanese politician
- Takeshi Hosoyamada (細山田 武史; born 1986), Japanese baseball player
- Takeshi Hotta (堀田 剛司; born 1978), Japanese Head coach
- Takeshi Imamura (今村 武志; 1880–1960), Japanese Director of the Karafuto Agency
- Takeshi Inomata (猪俣 猛; 1936–2024), Japanese jazz drummer and bandleader
- Takeshi Inoue (boxer) (井上 岳志; born 1989), Japanese OPBF Super Welterweight Champio
- Takeshi Inoue (footballer) (井上 健; 1928–1992), Japanese footballer
- Takeshi Inoue (mixed martial artist) (井上 武; born 1980), Japanese mixed martial artist
- Takeshi Ito (伊東 壮; 1929–2000), Japanese economist and peace activist
- Takeshi Ito (伊藤 健史; born 1987), Japanese footballer
- Takeshi Itoh (伊東 毅; born 1954), Japanese jazz fusion saxophonist and flute player
- Takeshi Iwamoto (岩本 武志; born 1949), Japanese ice hockey player
- Takeshi Iwaya (岩屋 毅; born 1957), Japanese politician
- Takeshi Kaga (鹿賀 丈史; born 1950), Japanese actor
- Takeshi Kaikō (開高 健; 1930–1989), Japanese novelist, short-story writer, essayist, literary critic and television documentary writer
- Takeshi Kajikawa (梶川 武志; born 1971), Japanese golfer
- Takeshi Kamo (加茂 健; 1915–2004), Japanese football player
- Takeshi Kamura (嘉村 健士; born 1990), Japanese badminton player
- Takeshi Kanamori (金森 健志; born 1994), Japanese footballer
- Takeshi Kanazawa (金澤 岳; born 1984), Japanese former professional baseball catcher
- Takeshi Kaneko (金子 丈; born 1993), Japanese professional baseball player
- Takeshi Kaneshiro (金城 武; born 1973), Taiwanese-Japanese actor and singer
- Takeshi Katō (actor) (加藤 武; 1929–2015), Japanese stage and film actor
- Takeshi Katō (gymnast) (加藤 武司; 1942–1982), Japanese gymnast and Olympic champion
- Takeshi Kawaharazuka (河原塚 毅; born 1975), Japanese former football player
- Takeshi Kawakami (川上 猛; born 1972), Japanese shogi player
- Takeshi Kawamoto (川本 武史; born 1995), Japanese swimmer
- Takeshi Kawamura (川村 毅; born 1959), Japanese playwright and director
- Takeshi Kimura (木村 武; 1912–1988), Japanese screenwriter
- Takeshi Kimura (racing driver) (木村 武史; born 1970), Japanese racing driver
- Takeshi Kitano (北野 武; born 1947), known as Beat Takeshi, Japanese filmmaker and star of Takeshi's Castle
- Takeshi Kizu (木津 武士; born 1988), Japanese rugby union player
- Takeshi Koba (古葉 竹識; 1936–2021), Japanese professional baseball player and manager
- Takeshi Kobayashi (小林 武史; born 1959), Japanese keyboardist, lyricist, composer, arranger and record producer
- Takeshi Kobayashi (wrestler) (小林 武; born 1948), Japanese sport wrestler
- Takeshi Kodama (児玉 剛始; born 1971), Japanese rower
- Takeshi Koga (古賀 武; born 1939), Japanese retired judoka
- Takeshi Koike (小池 健; born 1968), Japanese animator, illustrator and film director
- Takeshi Konomi (許斐 剛; born 1970), Japanese manga artist
- Takeshi Koshida (越田 剛史; born 1960), Japanese football manager and former footballer
- Takeshi Koura (小浦 猛志; born 1942), Japanese former professional tennis player
- Takeshi Kozai (小齋 武志; 1974–2006), Japanese judoka
- Takeshi Kusaka (日下 武史; 1931–2017), Japanese actor and voice actor
- Takeshi Kusao (草尾 毅; born 1965), Japanese actor, voice actor, and singer
- Takeshi Kuwahara (桑原 剛; born 1985), Japanese soccer coach and former player
- Takeshi Maeda (前田 武志; born 1937), Japanese retired politician
- Takeshi Masada (正田 壮史; born 2001), Japanese professional wrestler
- Takeshi Masu (升 毅; born 1955), Japanese actor
- Takeshi Matsu (松 武; born 1973), Japanese gay manga artist
- Takeshi Matsuda (松田 丈志; born 1984), retired Japanese Olympic, Asian and National Record holding swimmer
- Takeshi Miki (三木 健; born 1986), Japanese footballer
- Takeshi Minamino (南野 タケシ; born 1985), Japanese professional wrestler
- Takeshi Mitarai (御手洗 毅; 1901–1984), Japanese founder of Canon Inc
- Takeshi Miura (三浦 威; 1938–2013), Japanese actor
- Takeshi Miyaji (宮路 武; 1965–2011), Japanese video game developer
- Takeshi Miyamoto (宮本 岳志), Japanese politician
- Takeshi Miyamoto (baseball) (宮本 丈; born 1995), Japanese baseball player
- Takeshi Miyanaga (宮永 武司), Japanese mixed martial artist
- Takeshi Miyazawa (宮沢 武史; born 1978), Canadian comic book artist
- Takeshi Mizubayashi (水林 彪; born 1947), Japanese professor
- Takeshi Mizukoshi (水越 武; born 1938), Japanese photographer
- Takeshi Mizuuchi (水内 猛; born 1972), Japanese footballer
- Takeshi Mori (announcer) (森 武史; born 1959), Japanese television announcer
- Takeshi Mori (commander) (森 赳; 1894–1945), Japanese lieutenant general in the Imperial Japanese Army
- Takeshi Mori (director) (もり たけし; born 1963), Japanese anime director, storyboard artist and scriptwriter
- Takeshi Morishima (森嶋 猛; born 1978), Japanese professional wrestler
- Takeshi Morishita (森下 健; born 1932), Japanese physician and scholar
- Takeshi Moriuchi (森嶋 猛; born 1975), Japanese conductor
- Takeshi Motomiya (本宮 健史; born 1959), Japanese artist
- Takeshi Motoyoshi (本吉 剛; born 1967), Japanese former football player
- Takeshi Murata (born 1974), American contemporary artist
- Takeshi Nagano (永野 健; born 1985), Japanese volleyball player
- Takeshi Nagao (長尾 猛司; born 1943), Japanese sport wrestler
- Takeshi Nagata (永田 武; 1913–1991), Japanese geophysicist
- Takeshi Nakamura (中村 武志; born 1967), Japanese former professional baseball catcher
- Takeshi Nakano (中野 剛志; born 1971), Japanese bureaucrat, conservative critic and scholar
- Takeshi Natori (名取 武; 1913-1985), Japanese football player
- Takeshi Niinami (新浪 剛史; born 1959), Japanese business executive
- Takeshi Noda (野田 毅; born 1941), Japanese politician
- Takeshi Noma (野間 健; born 1958), Japanese politician
- Takeshi Noma (野間 赳; 1934–2023), Japanese politician
- Takeshi Nomoto (野元 勇志; born 1989), Japanese former professional basketball player
- Takeshi Nomura (野村 武史; 1919–1985), Japanese Nippon Professional Baseball pitcher
- Takeshi Obata (小畑 健; born 1969), Japanese manga artist
- Takeshi Ōjitani (王子谷 剛志; born 1992), Japanese judoka
- Takeshi Oka (岡 武史; born 1932), Japanese-American spectroscopist and astronomer
- Takeshi Oki (大木 武; born 1961), Japanese former football player and manager
- Takeshi Okumura (奥村 健; born 1952), Japanese pocket billiards player
- Takeshi Okumura (horse racing) (奥村 武; born 1976), Japanese racehorse trainer
- Takeshi Onaga (翁長 雄志; born 1950), Japanese politician
- Takeshi Ono (大野 毅; born 1944), Japanese former football player
- Takeshi Ono (footballer, born 1962) (小野 剛; born 1962), Japanese former football player and manager
- Takeshi Rikio (力皇 猛; born 1972), Japanese professional wrestler
- Takeshi Saito (footballer) (斉藤 武志; born 1979), Japanese footballer
- Takeshi Saito (ice hockey) (齊藤 毅; born 1981), Japanese ice hockey player
- Takeshi Saito (mathematician) (斎藤 毅; born 1961), Japanese mathematician
- Takeshi Saito (musician) (斎藤 毅; born 1959), Japanese violinist
- Takeshi Sakamoto (坂本 武; 1899–1974), Japanese actor
- Takeshi Sakurada (桜田 武; 1891–1943), Japanese lieutenant general
- Takeshi Sasaki (首藤 剛志; born 1996), Japanese judoka
- Takeshi Sasaki (political scientist) (佐々木 毅; born 1942), Japanese political scientist
- Takeshi Sato (佐藤 タケシ; born 1981), Japanese professional wrestler
- Takeshi Senoo (妹尾 武; born 1969), Japanese composer
- Takeshi Seyama (瀬山 武司; born 1944), Japanese film editor
- Takeshi Shimazaki (島崎 毅; born 1967), Japanese retired professional pitcher
- Takeshi Shina (階 猛; born 1966), Japanese politician
- Takeshi Shirai (白井 岳; 1977–2024), Japanese equestrian
- Takeshi Shudo (首藤 剛志; 1949–2010), Japanese scriptwriter
- Takeshi So (宗 猛; born 1953), Japanese long-distance runner
- Takeshi Sugita (杉田 武; born 1947), Japanese sport shooter
- Takeshi Suzuki (academic) (鈴木 斌; 1932–2005), Japanese professor
- Takeshi Suzuki (alpine skier) (鈴木 猛史; born 1988), Japanese alpine skier and Paralympic athlete
- Takeshi Takashina (高品 彪; 1891–1944), Japanese general
- Takeshi Takeoka (たけおか たけし; born 1999), Japanese judoka
- Takeshi Takeuchi (武内 崇; born 1973), Japanese artist
- Takeshi Taketsuru (竹鶴 威; 1924–2014), Japanese whisky distiller
- Takeshi Terada (寺田 武史; born 1980), Japanese former football player
- Takeshi Terauchi (寺内 タケシ; 1939–2021), Japanese rock guitarist
- Takeshi Teshima (手島 猛; born 1941), Japanese fencer
- Takeshi Tokuda (徳田 毅; born 1971), Japanese former politician
- Takeshi Tokutomi (徳富 斌; born 1941), Japanese former volleyball player
- Takeshi Tomizawa (富澤 岳史; born 1974), Japanese comedian and actor
- Takeshi Tsuchiya (土屋 武士; born 1972), Japanese professional race car driver
- Takeshi Tsujimura (辻村 猛; born 1974), Japanese former Grand Prix motorcycle road racer
- Takeshi Tsuruno (つるの 剛士; born 1975), Japanese actor
- Takeshi Uchiyamada (内山田 竹志; born 1946), Japanese businessman
- Takeshi Ueda (上田 剛士; born 1968), Japanese musician
- Takeshi Umehara (梅原 猛; 1925–2019), Japanese philosopher and critic
- Takeshi Urakami (浦上 壮史; born 1969), Japanese former football player
- Takeshi Urata (浦田 武; 1947–2012), Japanese astronomer
- Takeshi Usami (宇佐美 毅; 1903–1991), Japanese bureaucrat
- Takeshi Ushibana (牛鼻 健; born 1977), Japanese former football player
- Takeshi Watabe (渡部 猛; 1936–2010), Japanese actor and voice actor
- Takeshi Watanabe (civil servant) (渡辺 武; 1906–2010), Japanese bureaucrat
- Takeshi Watanabe (footballer) (渡辺 毅; born 1972), Japanese former football player
- Takeshi Yagi (八木 毅; born 1967), Japanese TV director/producer
- Takeshi Yamada (born 1960), Japanese-American artist
- Takeshi Yamaguchi (山口 武士; born 1979), Japanese footballer
- Takeshi Yamakage (山影 武士; born 1945), Japanese swimmer
- Takeshi Yamanaka (山中 武司; born 1971), Japanese ice hockey player
- Takeshi Yamasaki (山﨑 武司; born 1968), Japanese retired professional baseball player
- Takeshi Yasuda (安田 武; born 1943), Japanese potter
- Takeshi Yasukawa (安川 壮; 1914–2000), Japanese diplomat
- Takeshi Yasutoko (安床 武士; born 1986), Japanese professional vert skater
- Takeshi Yokoyama (横山 武史; born 1998), Japanese jockey
- Takeshi Yonezawa (米澤 剛志; born 1969), Japanese former football player
- Takeshi Yoshida, Japanese engineer
- Takeshi Yoshioka (吉岡 毅志; born 1979), Japanese actor
- Hiroki Takeshi, better known as AK-69 (born 1978), Japanese rapper, singer-songwriter

== Fictional characters ==
- Takeshi (タケシ), a character in the Pokémon media franchise, better known as Brock in English
- Takeshi, a character in the television series Teenage Mutant Ninja Turtles
- Takeshi Goda (剛田 武), a character in the manga series Doraemon
- Takeshi Honda (本田 武史), a character in the anime series Yuri on Ice, based on the actual Takeshi Honda
- Takeshi Hongō (本郷 猛), a character in the tokusatsu franchise Kamen Rider
- Takeshi Kovacs, a character in many books by Richard Morgan
- Takeshi Kuroiwa (黒岩 武司), a character in the My Hero Academia spin-off My Hero Academia: Vigilantes mostly known as Knuckleduster
- Takeshi Manganji, a character in the anime series Crush Gear Turbo
- Takeshi Momoshiro (桃城 武), a character in the manga series Prince of Tennis
- Takeshi Nishigōri (西郡 豪), a character in the anime series Yuri on Ice
- Takeshi Saehara (冴原 剛), a character in the manga series D.N.Angel
- Takeshi Sendo (千堂 武士), a character in the manga series Hajime no Ippo
- Takeshi Shirokane, a character in the web comic Okashina Okashi – Strange Candy
- Takeshi Sugimori (杉森 威), a character in the Inazuma Eleven media franchise
- Takeshi Yamamoto (山本 武), a character in the manga series Reborn!

== See also ==
- Takeshi (Kamen Rider) (猛士), a fictional organization in Kamen Rider Hibiki
- Takeshis', a 2005 film by, and starring, Takeshi Kitano
- Takeshi's Castle
