= Noriega (surname) =

- Place of origin: Spain

Noriega is a surname of Spanish origin, and may refer to:

- Adela Noriega (born 1969), Mexican actress
- Carlos I. Noriega (born 1959), American astronaut
- Dani Noriega (born 1989), better known as Adore Delano, American drag queen
- Eduardo Noriega (Spanish actor) (born 1973), Spanish film actor
- Eduardo Noriega (Mexican actor) (1916–2007), Mexican film actor
- José de la Guerra y Noriega (1779–1858), soldier and early settler of California
- José Dávalos Noriega (born 1927), Mexican Olympic boxer
- José María Noriega (born 1958), Spanish footballer
- José Noriega (1796–1869), Spanish-born Californio ranchero and politician
- José Noriega (Florida politician) (1788–1827), American politician and brickyard owner
- Manuel Noriega (1934–2017), Panamanian politician and military officer
- Manuel Noriega Ruiz (1880–1961), Mexican stage and film actor, screenwriter, and film director
- Noriega (producer), reggaeton producer
- Patricio Noriega (born 1971), former Argentine Rugby Union footballer
- Roger Noriega (born 1959), U.S. diplomat and policy maker specializing in Western Hemisphere Affairs
- Rick Noriega (born 1958), former member of the Texas House of Representatives
- Susana Noriega (born 1952), Mexican painter
- Víctor Noriega (born 1972), Mexican actor, singer and model
- Victor Noriega (pianist) (born 1978), American jazz pianist
- Zenón Noriega Agüero (1900–1957), Peruvian army general

== See also ==
- Noreaga, American rapper now known as N.O.R.E.
