= Koven =

Koven is a surname. Notable people with the surname include:

- Anna de Koven (1862–1953), American novelist, historian and socialite
- Ernest de Koven Leffingwell (1875–1971), arctic explorer, geologist and Spanish–American War veteran
- Henry William John Koven, connected with SS Sauternes, a steamship built in 1922
- James De Koven, also known as James DeKoven, (1831–1879), priest, an educator and leader of the Oxford Movement in the Episcopal Church
- Jamie Koven (born 1973), American rower
- Jean de Koven (1915–1937), dancer from Boston, Massachusetts, who was murdered in Paris, France in 1937
- Reginald De Koven (1859–1920), American music critic and prolific composer, particularly of comic operas
- Steve Koven, Canadian jazz pianist and member of the Steve Koven Trio

Koven may also refer to:

- Koven (group), a British drum and bass duo formed in 2011

== See also ==
- Covens
- Govend
- Kofein
- Kovanj
- Kovend
- Kövend
