= Kuwahara =

Kuwahara is a Japanese surname. Notable Japanese people with the surname include:

- Bob Kuwahara (1901–1964), Japanese-American animator for Walt Disney and Terrytoons
- Katsuyoshi Kuwahara (born 1944), football player, brother Takashi Kuwahara
- Kentaro Kuwahara (born 1985), baseball player
- Masayuki Kuwahara (born 1993), baseball player
- Mikine Kuwahara (1895–1991), government official
- Shun Kuwahara, gymnast
- Takashi Kuwahara (born 1948), football player and manager, brother of Katsuyoshi Kuwahara
- Takeshi Kuwahara (born 1985), football player
- Yasuo Kuwahara, composer and mandolinist
- Yasuyuki Kuwahara (1942–2017), football player
- Yūki Kuwahara (桑原 由気, born 1991), voice actress

== Fictional characters ==
- Jackal Kuwahara, see List of The Prince of Tennis characters
