= Stuart de Silva =

Sri Lankan jazz pianist

Stuart de Silva was a jazz pianist from Sri Lanka.

He played in a group that broadcast on Sri Lankan radio backing among others, singer Yolande Bavan. Dave Brubeck later arranged for a scholarship for de Silva to study jazz compositions at Berklee College in the United States. He then went to London, England, where he played at the Flamingo jazz club, among other jazz venues.

Moving on to Paris, France, in March 1967, he was one of the pianists—the others being Joe "Stride" Turner, Errol Parker, Claude Bolling, Michel Sardaby, and Aaron Bridgers, accompanied on some tracks by bassist John Lamb, among others—who recorded the 90-minute session known as Tape for Billy, dedicated to Billy Strayhorn, who was in hospital. Duke Ellington, also in Paris, personally supervised the recording, although he did not actually perform on it himself, and wanted to use the proceeds from its sale to create a Billy Strayhorn scholarship in Paris, similar to the one at Juilliard in New York.

From Paris, de Silva went on to Barcelona backing Ruth Brown as part of a trio with Ron Jefferson, who had just left the West Coast.

In 1970, de Silva starred as supporting character Ranji in the controversial film Tropic of Cancer. alongside Rip Torn and Academy Award-winning actress Ellen Burstyn.

In 1986, he moved to Sydney, Australia, where he finally retired from the music business.

On August 16, 2015, Stuart de Silva died in Sydney, Australia.
