= Michel Sardaby =

French jazz pianist (1935–2023)

- Born: 4 September 1935; Fort de France, Martinique
- Died: 6 December 2023 (aged 88); Paris, France
- Genres: Jazz
- Occupation: Musician
- Instrument: Piano
- Years active: 1967–2014

Michel Sardaby (4 September 1935 – 6 December 2023) was a French jazz pianist.

== Background and career ==
Born in Fort-de-France, Martinique, he moved to Paris, where in March 1967, he was one of the pianists, the others being Joe "Stride" Turner, Errol Parker, Claude Bolling, Stuart de Silva, and Aaron Bridgers, accompanied on some tracks by bassist John Lamb, among others, who recorded the 90-minute session known as Tape for Billy, dedicated to Billy Strayhorn, who was in hospital. Duke Ellington, also in Paris, personally supervised the recording. However, he did not perform on it himself, and wanted to use the proceeds from its sale to create a Billy Strayhorn scholarship in Paris, similar to the one at Juilliard in New York.

Sardaby's first album Five Cat`s Blues was recorded in October 1967 in Paris with 5 compositions created by the pianist. In 1970, he led a trio comprising Percy Heath and Connie Kay for his second album, Night Cap. A 1972 New York recording has him leading a line-up comprising Richard Davis, Billy Cobham and Ray Barretto (Sound Hills Records 1997). His album, Gail (1974), won the 1976 Prix Boris Vian.

For his 1989 album, Going Places, he was accompanied by Rufus Reid and Marvin "Smitty" Smith, and in 1993, he recorded with his quintet, which comprised Ralph Moore, Louis Smith, Peter Washington and Tony Reedus.

Sardaby died in Paris on 6 December 2023, at the age of 88.

== Discography ==
=== As leader/co-leader ===
- 1969 Five Cat`s Blues (President)
- 1970: Night Cap (Sound Hills)
- 1970: Blue Sunset
- 1972: Michel Sardaby in New York (Sound Hills)
- 1975: Gail (Disques Debs)
- 1985 Caribbean Duet Michel Sardaby and Monty Alexander (Harmonic Records)
- 1990: Going Places (Mantra)
- 1990: Night Blossom (DIW Records)
- 1990: In New York (Disques Debs)
- 1990: Con Alma (Mantra)
- 1993: Straight On (Sound Hills)
- 1997: Classics and Ballads (Sound Hills)
- 1997: Intense Moment (Sound Hills)
- 2003: Karen (Sound Hills)
- 2004 At Home (Sound Hills)
- 2014: Night in Paris (Sound Hills)

=== With T-Bone Walker ===
- Good Feelin' (Polydor, 1969)
