= Terada =

Terada (written: 寺田) is a Japanese surname. Notable people with the surname include:

== People ==
- Abby Terada (born 2004), Japanese-American collegiate golfer in Wisconsin
- Alicia Terada (born 1956), Argentine politician of Japanese descent
- Asuka Terada (寺田 明日香, born 1990), Japanese hurdler
- Haruhi Terada (born 1973), Japanese voice actress
- Itsurō Terada (寺田 逸郎, born 1948), Japanese lawyer
- Katsuya Terada (born 1963), Japanese illustrator and cartoonist from the town of Tamano, Okayama
- Keiko Terada (born 1963), Japanese rock singer
- Kenji Terada (born 1952), Japanese script writer, anime director, series organizer, novelist and scenario writer
- Kiyoyuki Terada (born 1922), Japanese aikido teacher
- Kokoro Terada (born 2008), Japanese actress
- Minoru Terada (born 1958), Japanese politician serving in the House of Representatives in the Diet
- Mitsuo Terada (born 1968), Tsunku (ja:つんく♂)'s real name, a prolific Japanese record producer, songwriter, and vocalist
- Noboru Terada (1917–1986), Japanese freestyle swimmer
- Sakurako Terada (born 1984), Japanese curler
- Shinichi Terada (born 1985), Japanese football player
- Shuhei Terada (born 1975), Japanese football player
- Soichi Terada (born 1965), Japanese electronic music composer
- Takeshi Terada (born 1980), Japanese football player
- Takuya Terada (born 1992), Japanese actor and singer
- Torahiko Terada (1878–1935), Japanese physicist and author
- Yojiro Terada (born 1947), Japanese racing driver

== Fictional characters ==
- Tokunosuke Terada, a supporting character from In/Spectre
- Yoshiyuki Terada, Sakura Kinomoto's teacher at Tomoeda Elementary School, from the manga and anime series Cardcaptor Sakura

== See also ==
- Terada Station (Kyoto), railway station in Jōyō, Kyoto, Japan
- Terada Station (Toyama), railway station in Tateyama, Nakaniikawa District, Toyama Prefecture, Japan
