= Kari Kraakevik =

- Born: 21 March 1986 (age 40); Fairfax, Virginia
- Genres: Classical music, jazz, americana
- Occupations: composer, performer and teacher
- Years active: 2008 –

Kari Kraakevik (Fairfax, Virginia, March 21, 1986) is an American composer, performer and teacher.

== Biography ==
In 2009, she became the first female composer to graduate from the music program at Pepperdine University. She was also awarded the "Most Outstanding Graduate Award" for her achievements in music composition, theory, and voice. This, in part, led to a full-ride scholarship and a stipend position as a Master's student at the University of Colorado Boulder.

Her large scale composition during this time was a piece for voice, chamber ensemble and electronics, entitled "Lost Angeles to Los Angel," which was awarded the Levy Prize in 2011. In 2013, Kraakevik entered the world of entrepreneurship while simultaneously maintaining affiliate faculty positions at the University of Colorado and Metro University in Denver. Her first endeavor was founding Reel Kids, a creative space that encourages students to explore various artistic forms. In 2015, she purchased the long-established music school Wildflower School of Voice and expanded it into what is now Boulder Music.

As a performer, Kraakevik has appeared in both equity and non-equity productions nationwide, including roles such as "Serena" in "Fame" and "Lucy" in "You're A Good Man, Charlie Brown." She has also premiered new works by fellow composers and performed solos at Carnegie Hall. Recently, she co-founded the jazz duo "Take Two" with her husband, pianist Joshua Rich. As part of the jazz duo, "Take Two", she has released three full albums, and countless singles. Performing primarily in Europe, the duo recently finished a 90-day tour, which included the recording of an additional three albums. The music was recorded at the prestigious "Officina Sonora Bigallo", and are slated for release in 2025.

Kraakevik continues to compose, with recent works like "Fabric of Sound," a multimedia piece interpreting fabric textures through a sensory lens, commissioned by Cellists for Change and scheduled for performance at the Center for Neurodiversity in Spring 2025.

Her long-time collaboration with esteemed writer, director, actor and educator Kelly McAllister, has produced several works as well as a working relationship at her educational theater company, Reel Kids.

Kari Kraakevik often performs the national anthem at events ranging from the United Nations to the NBA Champion Denver Nuggets. She has also had many of her original jazz and solo compositions aired on radio stations across the country, including KUVO Jazz and NPR affiliate KGNU.

Kari Kraakevik is an ASCAP composer, SEAMUS composer, NATS member, and a member of the International Alliance for Women in Music.

== Awards ==
- Most Outstanding Graduate Service Award, Pepperdine University, Malibu California May 2009
- Levy Prize, University of Colorado, Boulder, 2010
- Finalist for the Great American Song Contest Special, music category, "Christmas in Chicago", 2022

== Discography ==
Albums: Jazz duo, Take Two:

- Under The Yellow Umbrella (original jazz) 2021

Singles:

- Deck the Halls (cover Jazz) 2020
- Christmas In Chicago (original jazz) 2021
- Our 1st Christmas Holiday (original jazz) 2021
- Marquee (original jazz) 2022
- Chantilly Cake (original jazz) 2022
- Happy New Year Darling (original jazz) 2022
- Santa Still Believes In You (original jazz) 2022
- Bari/Shaddap You Face (original jazz) 2023
- The Grumps (original children's) 2024
- Tartaruga di Marine (original children's) 2024
- Bullfrog (original children's) 2024
- Confetti (original children's) 2024
- When It's Raining in Rome 2024 (original Jazz)
- Apri La Finestra e La Strada Canta (original classical/experimental, released 2024)
- More Than A Christmas Tree (original ballad, released 2024)
- Snow Angel People (original ballad, released 2024)
