= Tropic of Cancer (film) =

- Theatrical release poster
- Directed by: Joseph Strick
- Screenplay by: Betty Botley; Joseph Strick
- Based on: Tropic of Cancer by Henry Miller
- Produced by: Joseph Strick
- Starring: Rip Torn; James T. Callahan; David Baur; Laurence Lignères; Phil Brown; Dominique Delpierre
- Cinematography: Alain Derobe
- Edited by: Sidney Meyers; Sylvia Sarner
- Music by: Stanley Myers
- Production company: Tropic Productions
- Distributed by: Paramount Pictures
- Release date: February 27, 1970
- Running time: 87 minutes
- Country: United States
- Language: English

Tropic of Cancer is a 1970 American drama film directed by Joseph Strick, who also co-wrote the screenplay with Betty Botley. It is based on Henry Miller's 1934 autobiographical novel Tropic of Cancer. The film stars Rip Torn, James T. Callahan, David Baur, Laurence Lignères, Phil Brown and Dominique Delpierre. The film was released on February 27, 1970, by Paramount Pictures.

Strick had previously adapted other controversial works of literature – Jean Genet's The Balcony and James Joyce's Ulysses. Though the book came out in 1934, the film is set in the late 1960s when Paris, while little changed visually, was a very different place. Filming took place on location in Paris, produced by Joseph Strick with some help from the author, whose persona was portrayed by Rip Torn and his wife Mona by Ellen Burstyn. The novel had provided a test for American laws on pornography and the film was rated X in the United States, which was later changed to an NC-17 rating in 1992. In the UK the film was refused an 'X' certificate by the BBFC.

== Plot ==
Henry Miller, a writer from New York whose money has run out, lives in Paris on the generosity of American friends who give him food and a space to sleep. His wife Mona crosses the Atlantic to see him, but soon leaves when she realises the hopelessness of his position. When he does wheedle a bit of cash, he spends it on drink and women. He finds a job, providing bed and board though no pay, as a teacher of English at a boys' school in Dijon, but soon leaves. Another opportunity is to mentor a wealthy young Indian, which again does not last. Finally he lands a proper job with an American newspaper and becomes friends with another expatriate, Fillmore. From a rich family, Fillmore has got involved with Ginette, possibly a prostitute, who is possibly infected and probably pregnant. He suffers a mental breakdown and is hospitalised. Once he is released, Henry persuades him to head back fast to the US, promising to take care of Ginette. When Fillmore gives him 500 francs for Ginette, Henry realises that, despite his love for the Old World and the freedom he has enjoyed there, he too could now head back fast to the USA.

== Cast ==
- Rip Torn as Henry Miller
- Ellen Burstyn (uncredited) as Mona Miller
- James T. Callahan as Fillmore
- David Baur as Carl
- Laurence Lignères as Ginette
- Phil Brown as Van Norden
- Dominique Delpierre as Vite Cheri
- Magali Noël as The Princess
- Raymond Gérôme as M. Le Censeur
- Ginette Leclerc as Madame Hamilton
- Sabine Sun as Elsa
- Sheila Steafel as Tania
- Gladys Berry as American Lady
- George Birt as Sylvester
- Stuart de Silva as Ranji
- Steve Eckardt as Cronstadt
- Philippe Gasté as Train Passenger
- Gisèle Grimm as Germaine
- Eléonore Hirt as Yvette
- Jo Lefevre as Accordionist
- Françoise Lugagne as Iréne
- Edward Marcus as Boris
- Henry Miller as Spectator
- Christine Oscar as Helen
- Elliott Sullivan as Peckover

== Reception ==
On the review aggregator website Rotten Tomatoes, 75% of 8 critics' reviews are positive, with an average rating of 6.3/10.

== See also ==
- List of American films of 1970
