= Westminster School, Adelaide =

Coordinates: 35.002916°S 138.551534°E

Westminster School
- Marion, South Australia; Australia

Information
- Motto: Deo Duce (God Being Our Leader)
- Established: 1961
- Principal: Andrew Whiteman (acting)
- Chaplain: Phil Hoffmann
- Enrolment: Around 1150
- Campus: Suburban
- Area: 23 hectares
- Colours: Green & White
- Song: God be in my Head
- Affiliations: Uniting Church, SAAS, IGSSA, Round Square
- Website: http://www.westminster.sa.edu.au/

Westminster School is an independent, Uniting Church, Early Learning to Year 12, coeducational, day and boarding school located at Marion, South Australia, 12 km south of Adelaide. Founded as a Methodist day and boarding school for boys, the school was opened by the Prime Minister Robert Menzies in 1961 and is named after Westminster School in London. The school became co-educational in 1978, and has a current enrolment of around 1150 students.

== History ==
Westminster School was born out of a perceived need by the Methodist Church in South Australia for a day and boarding school in Adelaide to accommodate demand additional to that satisfied by the long-established Methodist-based school Prince Alfred College.

Planning for Westminster began with a meeting on 7 June 1957, although at that stage it was not known where or when the school would be built, or indeed what it would be named. With growing momentum, it was resolved in December of that year to purchase 10.1 hectares (twenty-five acres) of vineyards from the South Australian Housing Trust at Marion. At the inaugural fundraising dinner on 9 June 1959, 160 men volunteered to solicit 3000 prospective contributors to achieve a target of $200,000 for the first building phase. The amount ultimately raised by those who have been affectionately called "the Men of Westminster" was $320,000.

The school commenced on 7 February 1961. At the first assembly, broadcast on radio station 5KA, the Headmaster's opening address began with the words, "Let the life of the school begin". The foundation Headmaster, Douglas Forder, presided over an initial enrolment of 143 students with a staff of seven.

The initial buildings comprised a single classroom block (known as "200" Block), the Headmaster's residence and a changeroom block. Throughout the 1960s the campus expanded from its modest beginnings with the addition of the Boarding House (1962), Preparatory School (1963), Administration Block (known as "100" block) (1965), Carter Laboratories (1965), Chapel (1967), Gymnasium / Hall (1967) and in 1974 the Fricker Library was opened.

Boarders were originally housed at Shaftesbury House at 97 South Tce Adelaide, before on-campus dormitory style accommodation (known as "Heaslip House") was opened in 1962. The boarding facility also included a dining room and common room. In 1964 a further dormitory wing was added, which became known as "Woollacott House".

The move to become coeducational in 1978 arguably provided a catalyst in transforming Westminster from an institution that had been formed in the shadow of Prince Alfred College, to the significant entity which it now is in its own right.

In the 1990s, following the introduction of female boarders, the school acquired existing home units in Adeline Court, adjoining the school property, and progressively purchased additional units and land as boarding numbers grew.

== Campus ==
The Sir Shirley Jeffries Memorial Chapel was opened in 1967. Located in the central entranceway between the Preparatory and Senior Schools, the Chapel commemorates a former South Australian Minister of Education, Sir Shirley Jeffries, who was one of the early benefactors and supporters of the school, and who suggested the name "Westminster School".

The Michael Murray Centre for the Performing Arts is a multi-purpose auditorium opened in 1988. The school's second Headmaster, Michael Murray was a keen supporter of the arts during his tenure at Westminster.

The Cloisters, between the 100 and 200 blocks involved the creation of wide arched verandahs, a brick staircase, fountain and lawn area.

The Sports and Swimming Centre was opened in 2003 by the President of Round Square, ex-King Constantine II of Greece. Occupying the site of the former gymnasium, the centre comprises a 10 lane training and competition pool and separate learners' pool, two full-size basketball courts and rock climbing wall. The centre was enhanced in October 2014 with the addition of an on-site health club in partnership with EFM Health Clubs.

The dance studio and multi-purpose meeting room, the "David Jarman Room" opened on 18 May 2007. It is an upper floor area within the centre with a large balcony overlooking the main oval. This multi-purpose room is named after former long-serving staff member and Registrar David Jarman.

The total area of Westminster school is 23 hectares (57) acres. Including the Sturt Grove Farm.

Sturt Grove is a working farm area with vines, poultry, cows, sheep and goats, together with an on-site museum of early farm machinery. They are also known for their work in the Royal Adelaide Show with their Royal Show Team club presenting sheep, steers, goats and dairy cattle in the Royal Show.

== School Houses ==
There are 16 houses, 6 from the preparatory school and 10 from the senior school.

=== Senior School ===
The ten Houses in the Senior School are named primarily after early benefactors of the school:

- Carter (sky blue), named after Roy Carter O.B.E., a significant benefactor
- Clark (green), named after L. Paul Clark, long serving Treasurer of Westminster School
- Dunstan (burgundy), named after Douglas Avon Dunstan OAM, a significant benefactor
- Fereday (navy blue), named after Stan Fereday, a significant benefactor
- Forder (pink), named after Douglas Forder, the school's first headmaster
- Fricker (orange), named after Fed Fricker, former chairman of the Building Committee
- Heaslip (red), named after Sidney (Frank) Heaslip AM, the school's first chairman of council
- Jeffries (yellow), named after Sir Shirley Jeffries, who suggested the name of the school be Westminster
- Kelly (purple), named after Art Kelly, a significant benefactor
- Woollacott (white), named after Harry Woollacott, first Secretary and first Chaplain of the school.

=== Preparatory School ===
In the Preparatory School the six Houses are:

- Abbey (orange) after Westminster Abbey, London
- Charter (sky blue) after a Grant of Authority or Rights, eg. Magna Carta
- Crown (purple) after the Head of the Commonwealth
- Mace (red) after the ceremonial staff carried before a sovereign
- Wesley (teal) after John Wesley, the founder of Methodism
- Wyvern (yellow) after the mythological beast found on the school's coat of arms.

== Sport ==
Westminster School is a member of the Sports Association for Adelaide Schools (SAAS), and the Independent Girls Schools Sports Association (IGSSA).

=== IGSSA premierships ===
Westminster School has won the following IGSSA premierships.

- Athletics (3) – 2012, 2013, 2014
- Badminton – 2018
- Basketball – 2003
- Netball (13) – 1990, 1992, 1993, 1994, 2000, 2001, 2002, 2006, 2008, 2011, 2019, 2020, 2021
- Tennis (5) – 2000, 2002, 2003, 2005, 2006
- Volleyball (6) – 2009, 2011, 2014, 2015, 2016, 2017

== Westventure ==
Westventure is the school's 12-day outdoor education programme for year 9 students, established in 1970. Originally based at Clayton on the shore of Lake Alexandrina, the school initially ran the programme in conjunction with Outward Bound. Following sale of the Clayton site, the school utilised a nearby camp site at Point Sturt owned by the Churches of Christ, until it was able to purchase the property in 2010.

== Glenroy Westminster ==
The school owns an additional 68-hectare property at Point Sturt, giving direct access to the lower Murray River. The property is being revegetated and is used in conjunction with activities of Westventure. Glenroy commemorates the name of the property owned at Carrieton by the school's first chairman of council, Frank Heaslip.

== Headmasters and principals ==
- 1961–1976: Douglas Highmoor Forder, BA, BSc (Adel)
- 1977–1993: Michael Murray, BA (Hons) Dip.Ed
- 1994–1998: David Jeremy Hone, BA(Hons) (Monash), CertEd, MEd (Oxon), MACE
- 1999–2009: Bradley T Fenner, BA(Hons), BEd (Melb), MACE, AIMM
- 2009–2016: Steve Bousfield, BSc (UEA), PGCE (Nott), MScM (CQU)
- 2017–2026: Simon Shepherd, BA, MEl, Grad Dip Ed, Grad Dip Outdoor Ed
- 2026: Andrew Whiteman (Acting)
- Commencing 2027: Brad Snell BEd, MEdL, GAICD

Deputy headmasters have included Thomas Edmonds, who was one of the founding members of staff in 1961, and WGH (Bill) McDonald. Alan Green was the first full-time chaplain, serving from 1964 to 1976 and was succeeded by David Purling, Dean Davidson, Patrick Gillespie and currently Phil Hoffmann.

== Notable alumni ==
- Sarah Andrews – Labor member for Gibson in the South Australian House of Assembly
- Cullen Bailey – Former first-class cricketer for South Australia
- Dan Cullen – One-time Test cricketer for Australia and former first-class cricketer for South Australia
- Nick Cullen – Professional golfer, winner of 2014 Australian Masters golf tournament
- Nathan Konstandopoulos – A-League soccer player for Adelaide United
- Mark Holden – Barrister, actor, singer and former judge on hit TV show Australian Idol
- Kym Purling – Jazz pianist and composer
- Sean Rusling – Former AFL footballer for Collingwood
- Luca Sardelis – Child actress, known for The Hunting
- Bradley Selway QC – Former Crown Solicitor and Federal Court Judge
- Seb Tape – AFL footballer for the Gold Coast Suns, and member of the club's inaugural side
- David Tiller – Former SANFL football player for the North Adelaide Football Club

== See also ==
- List of schools in South Australia
- List of boarding schools
