= Marc Perrenoud =

Swiss jazz pianist and composer (born 1981)

- Born: 1981 (age 43–44); Berlin, Germany
- Genres: Jazz
- Occupation(s): Musician, composer
- Instrument: Piano
- Years active: Mid-2000s–present
- Website: marcperrenoud.com

Marc Perrenoud (born 1981) is a Swiss jazz pianist and composer.

== Life and career ==
Perrenoud, who is Swiss, was born in Berlin in 1981. His first jazz recording was Stream Out in 2006. The trio of Perrenoud, Marco Müller (bass) and Cyril Regamey (drums) released Vestry Lamento in 2014 after being together for seven years. It was their third album, following Logo and Two Lost Churches. The trio's sound was described by a reviewer for The Irish Times as "big-hearted, harmonically open music laid down over grooves from jazz and funk".

== Discography ==
An asterisk (*) indicates that the year is that of release.

=== As leader/co-leader ===
Year recorded	Title	Label	Personnel/Notes
2006*	Stream Out	Altrisuoni	Duo, with Sylvain Ghio (drums)
2008	Logo	Neu Klang	Trio, with Marco Müller (bass), Cyril Regamey (drums)
2011	Two Lost Churches	Double Moon	Trio, with Marco Müller (bass), Cyril Regamey (drums)
2013	Vestry Lamento	Challenge/Double Moon	Trio, with Marco Müller (bass), Cyril Regamey (drums)
2015	Hamra	Unit	Solo piano
2016*	Nature Boy	Double Moon	Trio, with Marco Müller (bass), Cyril Regamey (drums)
2019	Morphée	Neuklang	Trio, with Marco Müller (bass), Cyril Regamey (drums); released 2020
