= Takeshi Akiba =

Japanese ice hockey player

Personal information
- Nationality: Japanese
- Born: 4 May 1944 (age 80); Tokyo, Japan

Sport
- Sport: Ice hockey

Takeshi Akiba (秋葉 武士, Akiba Takeshi, born 4 May 1944) is a Japanese ice hockey player. He competed in the men's tournaments at the 1968 Winter Olympics, the 1972 Winter Olympics and the 1976 Winter Olympics.
