= Susana Noriega =

Mexican artist (born 1952)

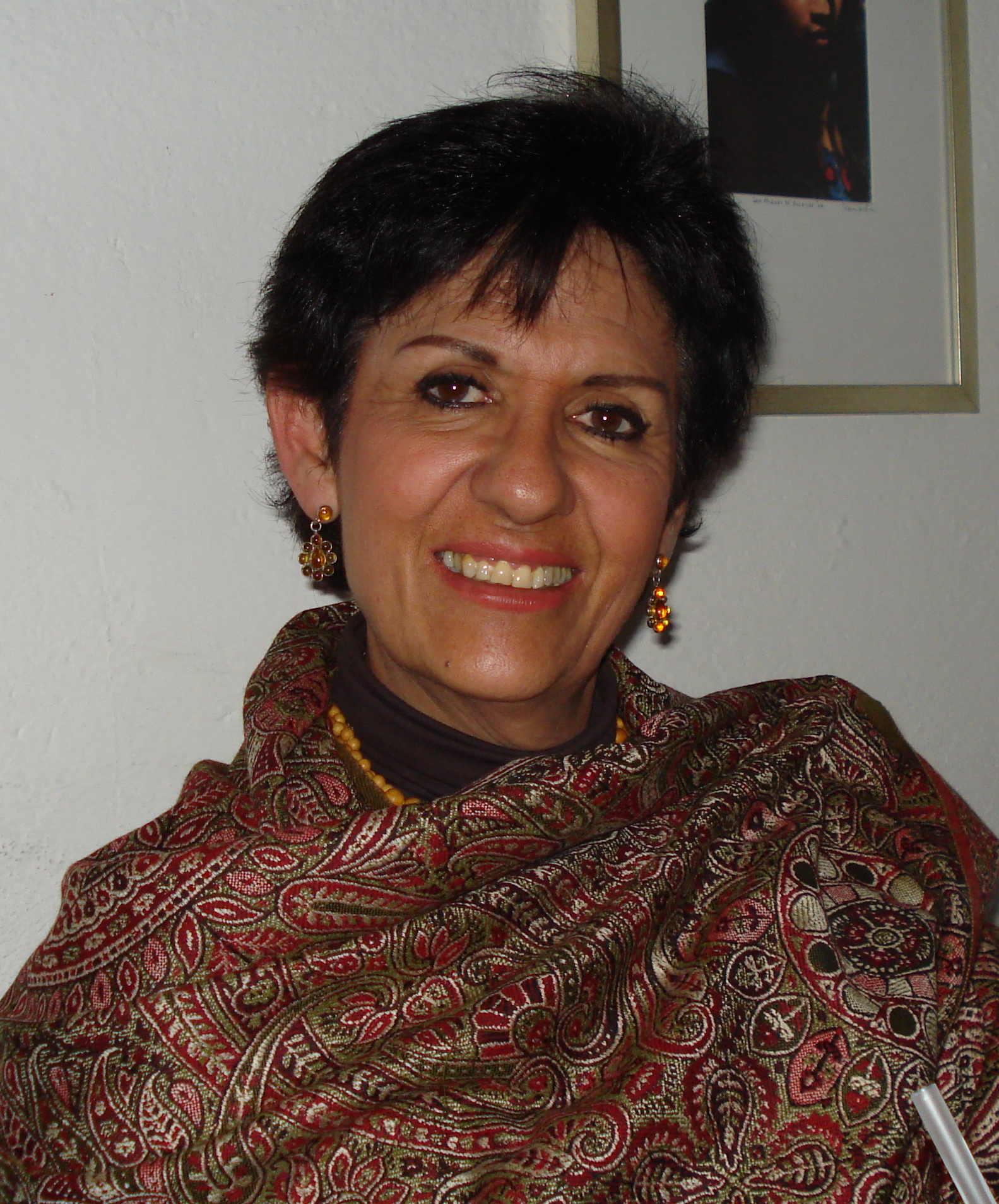
- Born: Susana Noriega Rivero; 15 February 1952 (age 73); Mexico City
- Occupation: Painter

Susana Noriega Rivero (born 1952) is a Mexican avant-garde painter, whose work is located in the abstract expressionist and surrealist movements.

== Biography ==
Noriega was born in Mexico City. She studied advertising and psychology, but in 1971, her artistic interests led her to attend the workshops of masters such as Raúl Anguiano and Rodolfo Nieto.

After her work was featured in a series of collective exhibitions, Noriega's first solo exhibition, in the Alliance Française at San Ángel in Mexico City, opened on April 27, 1979. According to a review in the Mexico City paper Novedades, the exhibition consisted of 38 graphite and mixed technique paintings, and the launch was attended by the Cultural Under-Secretary-General with the French Embassy, Patrick Abecasis. The exhibition ran until May 10.

== Exhibitions ==
She went on to exhibit, either individually or collectively, in the following venues and galleries:

- Galería Estela Shapiro, Mexico City, 1980
- Centro de Estudios en Ciencias de la Comunicación, Cuidad de Mexico, 1982, 1983
- Secretaría de Cultura y Bienestar Social del gobierno del estado de Querétaro (today Instituto Queretano de la Cultura y las Artes), México, 1985, 1986, 1987
- Casa de Cultura de Toluca, State of Mexico, 1991, 1992
- Centro Cultural Juan Rulfo, Mixcoac, Mexico City, 1996
- Mandarin House Restaurant Exhibition Hall, San Ángel, Mexico City, 1996, 1997
- Misrachi Gallery, Oaxaca, México, 1998
- Casa de las Campanas de Tlalpan, Mexico City, 1998, 1999, 2000
- X-Dada Exhibition Center, 2001
- Constante y Asociados Gallery, 1999, 2000, 2201, 2002
- Casa de la Cultura Jaime Sabines, Galerías Adán y Eva, Mexico City, 2002
- La Cueva de Bouchot, 2002, 2003, 2004, 2005
- The painter's studio, 2006-2013
- Goiko Arte, online gallery, 2013-2018
- Café-Arte, Guadalupe Inn, Mexico City, 2014
- Centro Cultural Juan Rulfo, Mixcoac, Mexico City, 2016

== Other work ==
Since the 1960s, Noriega has contributed her paintings to different media, such as magazines Plural and Sí para Jóvenes, and newspapers El Sol de Querétaro and El Sol de Toluca. She has also illustrated short-story and poetry collections.

== Gallery ==
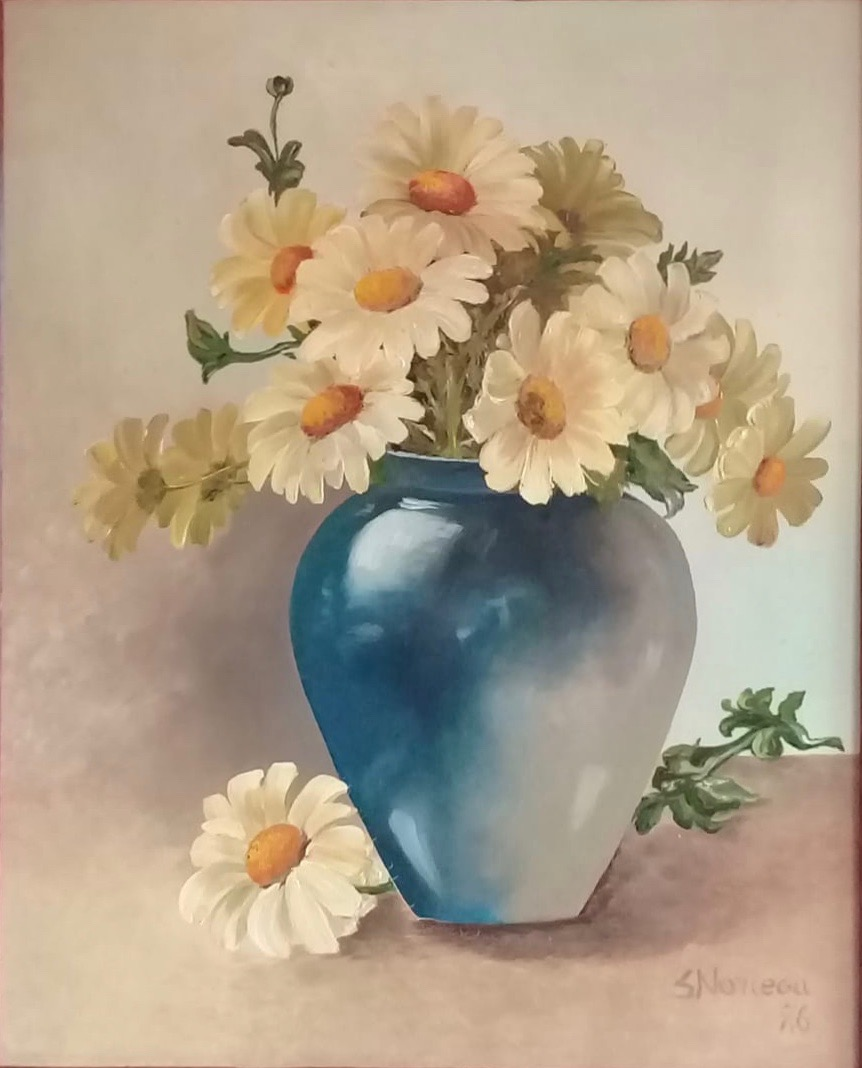
Sunflower marguerites, oil on canvas, 1986

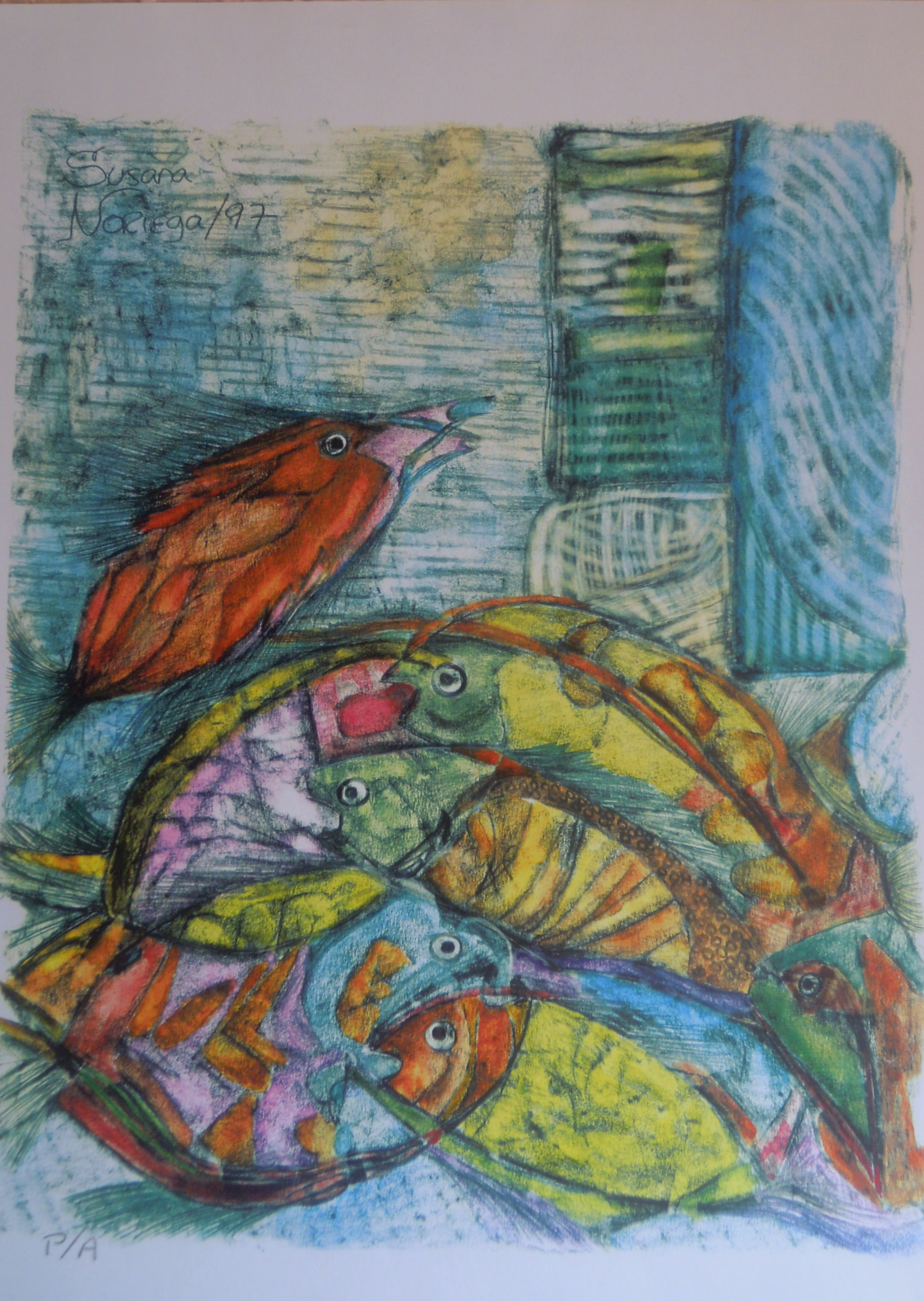
Fished fish, watercolor or engraved paper, 1997

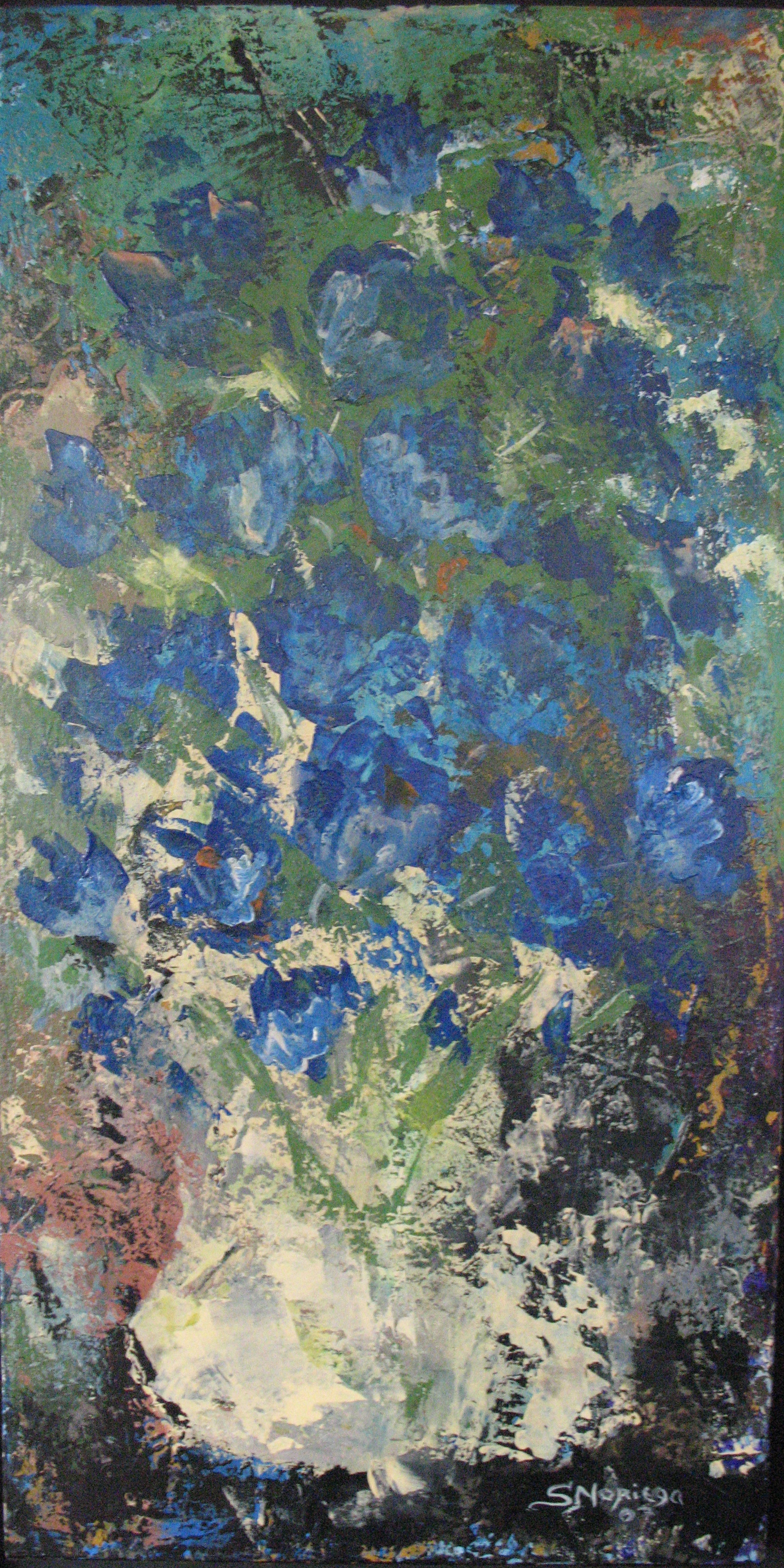
Blue flowers, cream vase, acrylic on canvas, 2007

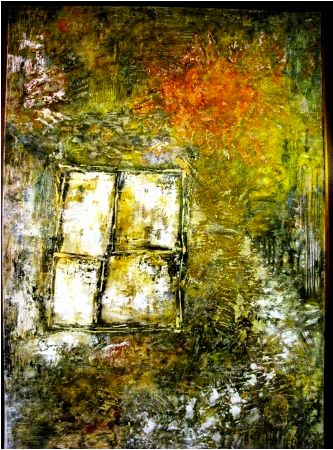
Window and road, mixed technique on canvas, 2009

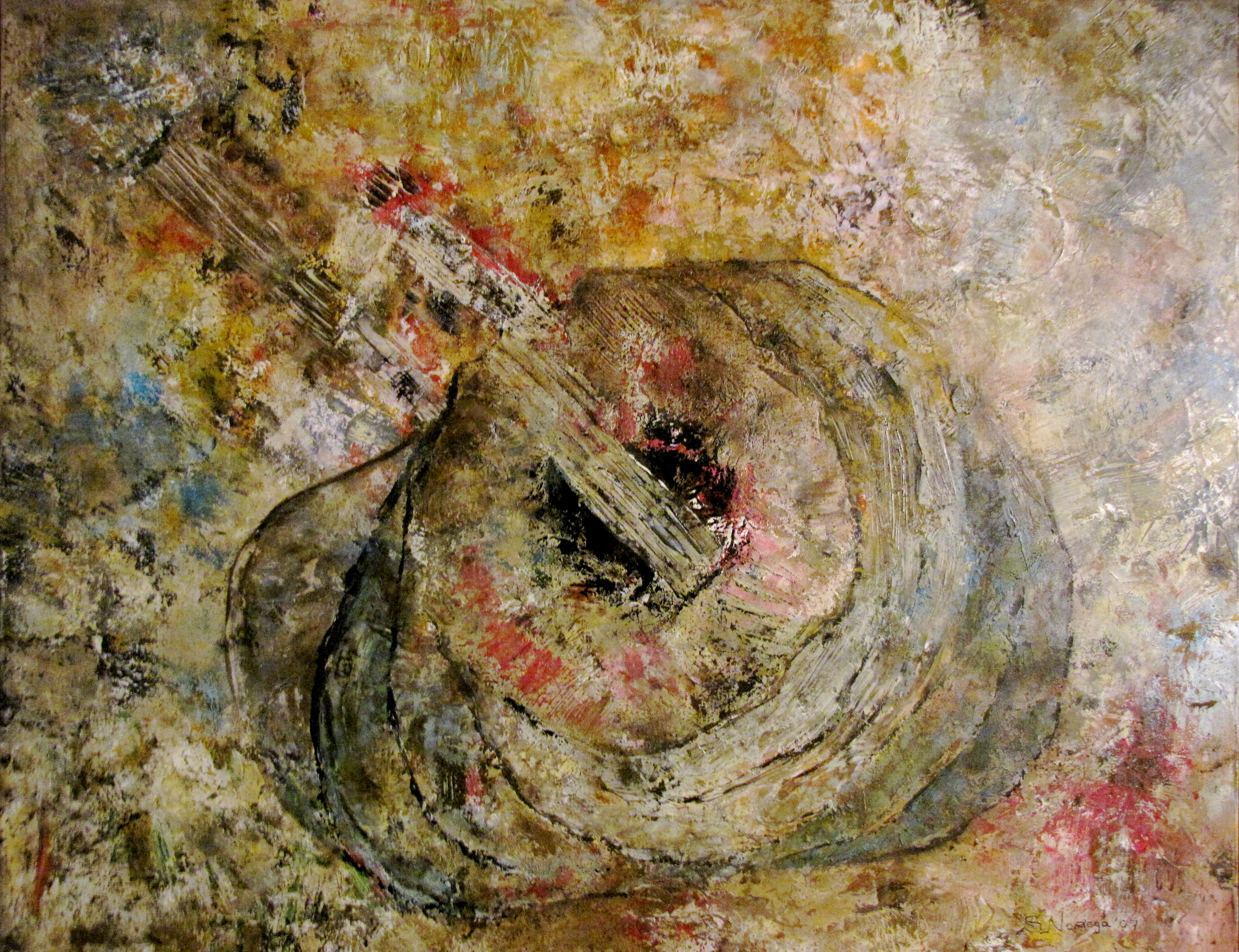
Zither, mixed technique on canvas, 2010
