= Joshua Rich =

American composer and pianist (born 1962)

- Born: 17 February 1962 (age 64); Lowell, Massachusetts, United States
- Genres: Solo piano, jazz, film, classical, pop
- Occupations: Pianist, composer, arranger, producer, actor, screenwriter, performer, music director and teacher
- Instrument: Piano
- Years active: Since 1970

Joshua Rich is a self-taught pianist who began playing and composing music when he was 8 years old.

== Biography ==
At the age of 12, Rich wrote his first song, "Trying Vegetables". With no formal education, Rich became a professional musician by age 14, when he appeared twice on the local Boston TV program, "Community Auditions". At the age of 17, he began performing in piano bars, and taught himself how to accompany and music direct variety shows at various high schools in the area.

Rich moved to San Francisco and was signed to a new age piano label which produced his first album of original piano solos, "Discover".

Settling in the Washington, D.C. area, Rich composed and performed music for children, and he music directed and played for many productions at the Adventure Theater in Glen Echo, Maryland, which featured his original songs. Around this time, he also became a school performer, and created a multi-cultural interactive musical program, "It's A Global Thing", which he performed at many schools and venues. Rich also created, wrote and released the children's album with the same title, "It’s A Global Thing". His follow-up children's album, "Trying Vegetables", would come a few years later. His work with children also led him to work with the composer and conductor Marvin Hamlisch, who hired him to accompany and musical direct children's choirs for several events.

In 2006, he released the piano album Rain. He began working as a teacher of musical theater and drama for both children and adults.

In the late 2000s, a short period of time was spent living and working in New York City, where he performed at piano bars and clubs, and accompanied Broadway performers. Returning to the D.C. area, he became an actor and screenwriter, and has appeared in a variety of independent and college films, as well as many commercials. He has also written several screenplays, and produced a few short films.

He is married to Kari Kraakevik. Together, they work as music teachers, music directors, and directors. They formed the jazz duo "Take Two," which features their original compositions in the style of Frank Sinatra and Ella Fitzgerald.

== Discography ==
Albums:

- Discovery (original solo piano) 1984
- It's A Global Thing (multi-cultural and original children's music) 1995
- Rain (original solo piano) 2000
- Talking To Furniture (original pop) 2001
- Trying Vegetables (original children's music) 2006
- Girl in Need Of Rescue (original pop ballads) 2007
- Darn That Dream (jazz) 2008
- Always (original pop) 2009
- Sounds of Beauty (original pop) 2011
- Inventions (improvisational classical music) 2012
- And The Cars Roll By (original pop) 2012
- Unforeseen (original pop) 2012
- Christmas in New York (original solo piano arrangements of holiday music) 2018
- Moments (original solo piano) 2019
- Come On Over (original pop) 2019
- Christmas Lights (original solo piano arrangements of holiday music) 2019
- Rich Classics (improvisational classical music) 2024

Singles:

- D.C. (original pop) 2002
- Comes The Time (original pop) 2016

Jazz duo, Take Two: Albums:

- Under The Yellow Umbrella (original jazz) 2021

Singles:

- Christmas In Chicago (original jazz) 2021
- Our First Christmas Holiday (original jazz) 2021
- Marquee (original jazz) 2022
- Chantilly Cake (original jazz) 2022
- Happy New Year Darling (original jazz) 2022
- Santa Still Believes In You (original jazz) 2022
- Bari/Shaddap You Face (original jazz) 2023
- The Grumps (children’s) 2024
- Tartaruga di Marine (children’s) 2024
- Bullfrog (children’s) 2024
- Confetti (children’s) 2024
