= Ari Erev =

Israeli jazz pianist

Ari Erev ארי ערב
- Born: 1956 (age 69–70); Tel Aviv, Israel
- Origin: Israel
- Genres: Jazz, Latin jazz
- Occupations: Pianist, composer, bandleader
- Instrument: Piano
- Years active: 1982–present
- Website: arierev.com

Ari Erev (Hebrew: ארי ערב; born 1956) is an Israeli jazz pianist and composer based in Tel Aviv. He has released four albums as a leader, blending original compositions with jazz arrangements of Israeli popular songs and Latin-influenced music.

== Career ==
Erev was born in Tel Aviv in 1956. He began learning classical piano as a child and turned to jazz in his late teens. Erev studied under musicologist Zvi Keren, jazz musician Moshe Osherowitz, pianist Nahum Perperkovich and attended the Tel Aviv University Academy of Music.

In 2008, Erev released his debut album About Time.The album was recorded with Yorai Oron on bass and Gideon Pasahov on drums. The trio's music combined original compositions, jazz standards including two associated with Bill Evans and arrangements of Israeli songs, among them Shalom Hanoch's "Shir le-Lo Shem" ("Song with No Name"). The album received positive reviews describing Erev as a "deliberative, resourceful and purposeful player" and presented the album as a continuous meditation on time rather than a collection of separate tracks. The album also received coverage in newspapers in 2008.

In 2012, Erev's second album, A Handful of Changes was released. The album featured New York saxophonist Joel Frahm and percussionist Gilad Dobrecky, alongside Israeli musicians including bassists Arie Volinez and Tal Ronen and drummer Eitan Itzcovich. The album combined Latin-influenced original compositions with jazz arrangements of songs by Sasha Argov, including "Kshe'Or Dolek Ba'Halonekh" ("When a Light Burns in Your Window") and "Me'ever la-Tekhelet". It also featured a reworking of Frédéric Chopin's Prelude in E minor, Op. 28, No. 4 that leads into Cole Porter's "So in Love". The album features melodic compositions that draw on established jazz traditions, with an emphasis on tonal expression and stylistic continuity rather than experimentation. The album also combines upbeat melodies with the expressive qualities of samba, incorporating Latin influences into its jazz arrangements.

Erev's third album, Flow was released in 2016. It featured a core trio with Eli Magen on bass and Ron Almog on drums, joined by Yuval Cohen on soprano saxophone and Dobrecky as guests. The album consisted mainly of original compositions, alongside pieces by pianist Fred Hersch, Brazilian pianist Debora Gurgel and Israeli composer Yohanan Zarai. One original, "July, Again", was dedicated to bassist Udi Kazmirski. The album consists primarily of original compositions that draw on Latin and Brazilian musical influences. It also combines post-bop influences with rich harmonic structures and Afro-Cuban rhythms. A review identified a mixture of traditional and Latin jazz, combining lyricism reminiscent of Evans with a Latin drive compared to Michel Petrucciani. The album was also covered in the by Yedioth Ahronoth, in February 2016.

In 2021, Erev released his fourth album Close to Home. The album was recorded in August 2020 at Pluto Studios in Tel Aviv, contains 13 tracks, including eight original compositions exploring the theme of home. The remaining tracks include works by Paul Simon, Antônio Carlos Jobim, Keith Jarrett, Debora Gurgel and Ephraim Shamir, including "Shi'ur Moledet" ("Homeland Class"), originally associated with the Israeli group Kaveret. The album features Assaf Hakimi on bass, Gasper Bertoncelj on drums, Gilad Dobrecky on percussion, Yuval Cohen and flutist Hadar Noiberg. The composition "Afar" is dedicated to Erev's daughter Tal.

Close to Home combines lyrical jazz with a range of musical influences, including Latin rhythms and Israeli popular music. The arrangement of "Shi'ur Moledet" moves from salsa to a Cuban groove, drawing on the Israeli popular-song tradition associated with composers such as Sasha Argov, Yoni Rechter and Matti Caspi.

A track from About Time, "Luigi's Muse", was included on the Japanese compilation Yasukuni Terashima Presents Jazz Bar 2019, issued by Terasima Records and distributed by Disk Union.

In Israel, Erev has performed in Tel Aviv jazz clubs and at the Tel Aviv Jazz Festival. In December 2019 he presented a programme titled "Open Possibilities" at the Kaufman Hall of the Tel Aviv Museum of Art, with American trumpeter Freddie Hendrix and flutist Hadar Noiberg as guests. A review of the concert listed pieces from Flow and later original compositions, alongside "Shi'ur Moledet" and Stevie Wonder's "Isn't She Lovely".

From the mid-2010s, Erev also appeared at clubs and festivals in Central and Eastern Europe, often with mixed Israeli and European line-ups. Concerts have been documented at Salon de Jazz in Cologne, Blue Note in Dresden, Cotton Club in Hamburg and B-Flat Jazz Club in Berlin. Other performances took place at Oliwski Ratusz Kultury in Gdańsk, the Regional Cultural Centre in Kołobrzeg, Jazzment in Szczecin and the White Stork Synagogue in Wrocław. He also appeared at jazz festivals in Bansko in 2023 and Varna in 2024. His musical collaborators have also included Israeli pop singer Gali Atari, Revital Raviv and Anna Spitz.

== Discography ==
=== As leader ===
- About Time (2008)
- A Handful of Changes (2012), featuring Joel Frahm
- Flow (2016)
- Close to Home (2021)

=== Compilation appearances ===
- "Luigi's Muse" on Yasukuni Terashima Presents Jazz Bar 2019 (Terasima Records / Disk Union, Japan, 2019)
