= Kym Purling =

- Born: 2 November 1972 (age 53); Saigon, South Vietnam
- Genres: Jazz, musical theater, world music
- Occupations: Pianist, entertainer, composer, conductor, producer, arranger, educator, world traveler, humanitarian
- Instruments: Piano, Musical director, conducting
- Years active: 1990–present
- Labels: Round Records, Baron Ulf's 5 Spot Label
- Website: www.kympurling.com, www.purlinginternational.com

Kym Purling is an Australian pianist, entertainer, composer, conductor, producer, educator, world traveller and humanitarian. He was born in Vietnam, adopted and raised in Australia and lives in New York City.

== Life and career ==
Kym Purling was found abandoned at the age of two or three days to unknown parents during the Vietnam War. After spending the first months of his life in two orphanages in Saigon (now Ho Chi Minh City), he soon became one of the first - if not the first - international adoptions of any nationality in Australia.

Purling discovered the piano at the age of five when he would mimic the songs his adoptive sister would practice by ear. He commenced formal classical piano training at six. He received his high school education at Westminster School, South Australia. He later completed a Bachelor of Music in Jazz Studies at the University of Adelaide, South Australia, where he formed the first Kym Purling Trio with bassist Tim Bowen and drummer Ben Riley. The trio received wide recognition in Australia and served as the rhythm section for many of Australia's leading jazz musicians and vocalists. During the mid 90s, he also recorded his first albums, Trio Juice, Catherine Lambert & The Kym Purling Trio, and Let's Swing!

In 1996, Purling served as an Ambassador for the Performing Arts between Australia and Vietnam. This was Purling's first return to his homeland since his adoption to Australia. During Purling's ambassadorship, he held sold-out concerts in concerts halls around Ho Chi Minh City and Hanoi, introducing jazz music to the Vietnamese people. During the residency, Purling also taught many children, students and professional musicians and made recordings for educational purposes. He featured in many newspaper articles and radio interviews during the time he spent in Vietnam. Vietnam's major TV network, VTV, also produced a special about Purling's life story and his connection to Vietnam.

At the conclusion of the ambassadorship, Purling briefly returned to his performances in Australia and also had two television documentaries made about his life story and career for Australian national television in 1998 and 1999. Soon after, Purling moved to the United States where he resided and worked in Las Vegas for two and a half years. During this time, Purling performed in many of the showrooms along the famed Las Vegas Strip, playing and musical directing for some of the biggest names in show business such as Kay Starr, Buddy Greco, The Mills Brothers, Marlena Shaw, David Cassidy, Clint Holmes and Frank Sinatra Jr.

Purling was then recommended to a Broadway theatrical company based in Times Square (Big League Theatricals, now Big League Productions), and began musical directing and conducting Broadway shows and national tours of hit Broadway musicals such as Footloose- The Musical, Miss Saigon and 42nd Street. Purling traveled 50 states of the U.S. conducting shows in small towns and large metropolises right across America, Canada and Japan.

Purling later relocated to Florida and formed another Kym Purling Trio with bassist Alejandro Arenas and drummer Mark Feinman. The trio worked often, giving many concerts around Florida. While in Florida, Purling formed the Kym Purling Jazz Orchestra (KPJO), one of the finest big bands on the U.S. east coast. During the next four years, Purling also worked regularly for HSN-TV, a national television network, making regular television performances and recording a U.S. national television show with vocal legend, Natalie Cole.

Purling was later appointed as musical director, conductor and pianist for vocal legend, Engelbert Humperdinck. With Humperdinck and his band, Purling spent he next two years conducting and performing across America and around the world, in many of the world's most prestigious concert halls and many of the largest outdoor arenas around the world.

The following months saw a move to Los Angeles where Purling resided for a short time. Purling performed regularly at the Montage Hotel in Beverly Hills and regularly recorded television commercials while in Los Angeles, as well as a headline fly-on entertainer on luxury high-end cruise lines.

Purling is performs concerts worldwide to support his various humanitarian projects, primarily assisting orphans and children in Vietnam, Nepal and other developing countries. In May 2015 in St. Petersburg, Florida, he raised money for the victims of the earthquakes in Nepal. He has given concerts and sourced funding to feed 2000 children in Nepal and later another concert to provide funds following the catastrophic earthquakes in Nepal in 2015. In 2019, Purling gave another concert to aid The Sunrise Children’s Association, an organization based in Adelaide, South Australia which reunites Nepalese orphans and trafficked children with their families and assists them to create a living for themselves. Purling has performed to raise funds for the Australian Cranial Facial Foundation, The Variety Club of South Australia, The Global Action Coalition (Florida-Nepal), Hands For Hope (Vietnam) and several other humanitarian charities.

== Purling & Covid 19 ==
In June 2020, during the Covid-19 pandemic, Purling's brother Michael was killed in a traffic accident in Vietnam when a car turned out towards oncoming traffic and struck Michael on a motorbike. In 2021, Purling met his current partner Sonya. Purling continues to tour and present concerts in Adelaide, around Australia and overseas.

== Recent Work ==
In 2023, Purling was musical director and pianist for the Australian premiere production of Lady Day at Emerson's Bar & Grill, where he performed at the piano with his trio and acted the role of Billie Holiday's pianist, Jimmy Powers, accompanying Zahra Newman as Lady Day. Purling performed well over 100 shows at Adelaide's Festival Center, Sydney's Belvoir Street Theatre and at Arts Centre Melbourne.

In 2024, Purling served as Musical Supervisor of The Questions, a new work by Australian playwright, Van Badham.

In 2025, Purling musically supervised and musical directed the Australian premiere of Kimberly Akimbo, a musical by Jeannine Tesori. Performances took for place two weeks in Adelaide and for six weeks at Arts Centre Melbourne.

In September 2025, Purling was inducted into the Australian Music Hall of Fame.

Purling's year in 2026 includes continuing concert performances in Australia, some concerts in Asia from February to May followed by an extended tour of Europe from June to September.

== Awards ==
Year	Category	Title	Result	Notes
1996	Most Outstanding Pianist of the Year	South Australian Music Industry Awards	Winner	

Year	Category	Title	Result	Notes
2025	Inducted into the Australian Music Hall of Fame			
