= Steve Koven =

Canadian jazz pianist and film maker

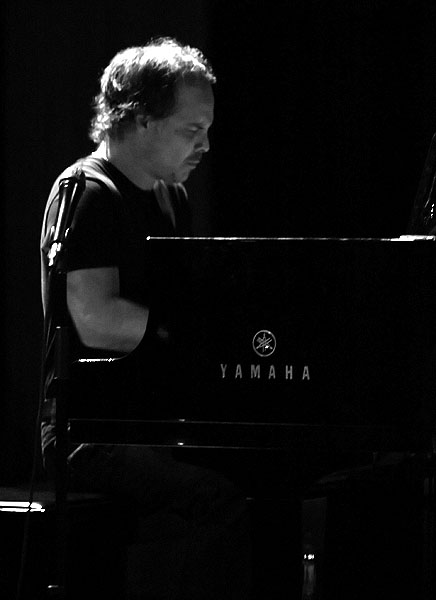

Background information
- Origin: Toronto, Canada
- Genres: Jazz
- Occupations: Musician, composer, educator
- Instrument: Piano
- Member of: Steve Koven Trio; The Koven Collective
- Spouse: Lee-Anne
- Website: stevekoven.com

Steve Koven is a Canadian jazz pianist and member of the Steve Koven Trio and the Koven Collective. He is a composer, performer, producer and educator.

In 1993 Koven established the Steve Koven Trio. Aside from performing worldwide with his trio, Steve also performs solo piano concerts throughout North America, Europe and the Caribbean. Dozens of Koven’s compositions have been licensed for national and international film and television productions. As an educator, Koven has been teaching in the Faculty of Music at York University since 2003, teaching Contemporary Improvisation and jazz piano. Koven also teaches Music at Toronto's Centennial College. He holds a master's degree in Music Composition and has presented master classes and clinics in China, Japan, Colombia, Barbados, Bahamas and Mexico.

Koven is also a film maker and has produced five documentaries: Music & Movement, 20 (Award winner for best short documentary in the Toronto Independent Film Festival 2015), Two Art Forms, Covenant of Remembrance, Improvisation(Award winner for the best short documentary in Toronto Short Film Festival 2017)

Koven lives in Toronto with his wife Lee-Anne.

== Discography ==
- Love Too (2021)
- Love (2021)
- Revisit (2020)
- Songs My Father Played (2019)
- The Koven Collective (2018)
- Beyond The C (2016)
- Solo Retrospective (2014)
- 20 (2013)
- Alone Together (2010)
- The Sound of Songs (2008) – nominated for best jazz CD at the Toronto Independent Music Awards
- Resurgence (2006)
- All The Time In The World (2004)
- Lifetime (2002)
- Not By The Elbows (2000)
- Sandbox (1999)
- Steve Koven Trio Live (1997)
