= Takeshi Asai =

- Born: 9 April 1964 (age 62); Nagoya, Japan
- Genre: Jazz
- Occupations: Jazz pianist, composer, producer, engineer and educator
- Instrument: Piano
- Years active: 2008–present

Takeshi Asai (born April 9, 1964) is a jazz pianist, composer, producer and educator.

== Biography ==
Takeshi was born in Nagoya, Japan, in 1964. He is a graduate of Berklee College of Music, where he studied with Laszlo Gardony, Joanne Brackeen, Ed Tomassi and Ed Bedner.

Takeshi Asai has been on the New York jazz scene for more than a decade. His music is characterized by a blend of traditional and modern influences, drawing inspiration from a wide range of sources. He appreciates the beauty of 12th-century French troubadours, Gregorian chants, Baroque and Romantic music, 20th-century composers like Leoš Janáček and Tōru Takemitsu, religious music, the Beatles, as well as Irish and Japanese folk traditions, and even modern electronic music.

Takeshi Asai has built an international career, touring countries around the world. In New York and France, he has shared the stage with renowned musicians like Bill Crow, Tony Marino, Gene Perla, Paul Rostock, Mark Wade, Rob Garcia, Brian Woodruff, Michael Vitali, Maxime Legrand, Nelson Hill, Hashem Assadullahi, Bob Gingery, Andrea Veneziani, Nori Naraoka, Pascal Combeau, Marc Peillon, Anthony Pinciotti, among others.

Takeshi has co-led a variety of projects, including the award-winning ensemble WaFoo, the Musical Chairs Chamber Ensemble (MCCE), Le Projet Électrique (The Electric Project), and a collaboration with UK singer Monika Lidke. He has also composed and arranged music for theater, working with artists such as singer and actress Lana Gordon, Jennifer Jade Ledesna, Juson Williams, Antonio McLendon and Robin Small.

Takeshi is also educator and Steinway Educational Partner. At his studio in New York, he has taught over 100 students and has produced numerous professional musicians, fostering new talent and contributing to the jazz and music community.

== Discography ==
List of albums:

Leader

- Somewhere in the Universe (1995)
- New York Trio Vol. 1 (2013)
- French Trio Vol. 1 (2014)
- French Trio Vol. 2 (2015)
- Takeshi Asai Solo: Live in New York (2016)
- Le Projet Electrique (The Electric Project) (2016)
- French Trio Vol. 3 (2017)
- French Trio Vol. 4 (2018)
- Solo: Live in New York Vol. 2 (2018)
- The Electric Project Vol. 2 (2021)
- Trio Vol. VI (2022)
- Solo Vol. III (2023)
- Quartet Vol. I (2024)

Co-leader

- Kaleidoscope (1995)
- D Original Soundtrack (2005)
- Organic Mood (2008)
- A Tale of Three Cities (2012)
- Nine Stories – the art of improvisation (2017)
- A Chantar M'er De So (2018)
