= Errol Parker =

- Born: Raphaël Schecroun; 30 October 1925; Oran, French Algeria
- Origin: Paris, France
- Died: 2 July 1998 (aged 72) New York City, New York, United States
- Genres: Jazz
- Occupation: Pianist
- Instrument: Piano

Errol Parker (né Raphaël Schecroun; 30 October 1925 – 2 July 1998) was a French-Algerian jazz pianist who played with Django Reinhardt, James Moody, Don Byas and Kenny Clarke, among others.

Born in Oran, French Algeria, Raphaël Schecroun (his working name derives from two of his jazz heroes, Erroll Garner and Charlie Parker) moved to Paris at the age of 18.

In 1964, Parker wrote the song "Lorre", which became a hit in France, and opened his own jazz club "Le Ladybird" on Rue de la Huchette.

Following a serious car accident that impaired his playing, Parker emigrated to New York City, where his daughter was to begin university in February 1968.

In America he started a second career as a record producer, but unable to find a suitable drummer he started to perform as a jazz drummer (which was not affected by his shoulder injury). He died of liver cancer in New York City, aged 72. His daughter was Elodie Lauten (1950-2014), a pianist and composer.

== Discography ==
- No. 2 Musique Pour Les Dragueurs (Decca, 1960)
- Musique Pour Les Tricheurs (Decca, 1960)
- Ouah! Ouah! Ouah! Ouah! (Decca, 1960)
- Au Tabou No. 4 (Decca, 1961)
- Errol Parker Trio (Philips, 1962)
- Errol Parker (Brunswick, 1963)
- Opus (Brunswick, 1964)
- Pretext (Brunswick, 1965)
- Minor Talk (Polydor, 1966)
- Le Roi Du Jazz Piano (Fontana, 1969)
- My Own Bag No. 1 (Sahara, 1972)
- My Own Bag No. 2 (Sahara, 1972)
- My Own Bag No. 3 (Sahara, 1975)
- African Samba (Sahara, 1976)
- The Errol Parker Experience (Sahara, 1977)
- Baobab (Sahara, 1978)
- Doodles (Sahara, 1979)
- Solo Concert Live at St Peter's Church (Sahara, 1979)
- Graffiti (Sahara, 1980)
- Tribute to Thelonious Monk (Sahara, 1982)
- The Errol Parker Tentet (Sahara, 1982)
- Live at the Wollman Auditorium (Sahara, 1985)
- Compelling Forces (Cadence, 1989)
