= Takeshi Kuwahara =

Japanese footballer

Takeshi Kuwahara 桑原 剛
Personal information
- Full name: Takeshi Kuwahara
- Date of birth: May 10, 1985 (age 41)
- Place of birth: Fukuoka, Fukuoka, Japan
- Height: 1.70 m (5 ft 7 in)
- Position: Midfielder

Youth career
- 2001–2003: Chikuyo Gakuen High School

Senior career*
Years	Team	Apps	(Gls)
2004–2005	Consadole Sapporo	14	(0)
2006	Mito HollyHock	32	(3)
2007	Thespa Kusatsu	21	(0)
2008–2009	Fukushima United FC	25	(13)
Total		92	(16)
- * Club domestic league appearances and goals

Takeshi Kuwahara (桑原 剛, Kuwahara Takeshi; born May 10, 1985) is a Japanese soccer coach and former player in the J.League.

== Career statistics ==
Appearances and goals by club, season and competition
Club	Season	League			Emperor's Cup		Total	
Club	Season	Division	Apps	Goals	Apps	Goals	Apps	Goals
Consadole Sapporo	2004	J2 League	14	0	1	0	15	0
Consadole Sapporo	2005	J2 League	0	0	0	0	0	0
Mito HollyHock	2006	J2 League	32	3	1	0	33	3
Thespa Kusatsu	2007	J2 League	21	0	0	0	21	0
Fukushima United FC	2008	Regional Leagues	14	10	1	0	15	10
Fukushima United FC	2009	Regional Leagues	11	3	1	0	12	3
Career total			92	16	4	0	96	16
