= Victor Noriega (pianist) =

American jazz pianist

- Born: May 5, 1978 (age 48); Vancouver, British Columbia, Canada
- Genres: Jazz
- Occupation: Musician
- Instrument: Piano
- Years active: 1996–present
- Website: noriegamusic.com

Victor Noriega (born May 5, 1978) is an American jazz pianist.

== Biography ==
Noriega was born in Vancouver on May 5, 1978. He moved from Canada to the United States with his family soon after birth, and grew up in both Portland, Oregon, and Seattle. He began his jazz piano career at age 18. He graduated from the University of Washington with a Bachelor of Music in Jazz Studies.

Since 2000, Noriega has played regularly with the Victor Noriega Trio, which additionally includes bassist Willie Blair and drummer Eric Eagle. They have recorded three albums together: Stone's Throw in 2004, Alay in 2006, and Fenceless (which also featured trumpet player Jay Thomas and alto saxophone player Mark Taylor) in 2008. Stone's Throw earned the trio a nomination for the Earshot Jazz Golden Ear Awards for Northwest Acoustic Jazz Group in 2005. Alay, which featured jazz renditions of traditional Filipino songs, won Noriega the 2006 Golden Ear Awards for both Northwest Instrumentalist of the Year and Recording of the Year.

He has played occasionally in Shanghai since 2005, performing at venues such as JZ Club.

Noriega was commissioned by the Oakland East Bay Symphony to write a symphony for orchestra as part of their "Notes from the Philippines" series. The resulting work, Generations, Directions, was premiered by the Oakland East Bay Symphony in April 2012.

Noriega's musical style has been compared to that of Dave Brubeck and Brad Mehldau.

Noriega also teaches jazz piano at Jean Lyons School of Music in Vancouver.

== Discography ==
- Stone's Throw (Victor Noriega, 2004)
- Alay (Victor Noriega, 2006)
- Fenceless (Pony Boy, 2008)
