= Takeshi Terada =

Japanese footballer

Personal information
- Full name: Takeshi Terada
- Date of birth: March 21, 1980 (age 46)
- Place of birth: Ibaraki, Japan
- Height: 1.72 m (5 ft 7 1/2 in)
- Position: Defender

Youth career
- 1995–1997: Kashima Antlers
- 1998–2001: Hannan University

Senior career*
Years	Team	Apps	(Gls)
2002–2009	Thespa Kusatsu	199	(7)
Total		199	(7)
- * Club domestic league appearances and goals

Takeshi Terada (寺田 武史, Terada Takeshi; born March 21, 1980) is a former Japanese football player.

== Career statistics ==
Appearances and goals by club, season and competition
Club	Season	League			Emperor's Cup		Total	
Club	Season	Division	Apps	Goals	Apps	Goals	Apps	Goals
Thespa Kusatsu	2002	Prefectural Leagues	13	1	-		13	1
Thespa Kusatsu	2003	Regional Leagues	14	1	1	0	15	1
Thespa Kusatsu	2004	Football League	29	2	5	0	34	2
Thespa Kusatsu	2005	J2 League	24	1	0	0	24	1
Thespa Kusatsu	2006	J2 League	26	0	1	0	27	0
Thespa Kusatsu	2007	J2 League	30	1	2	0	32	1
Thespa Kusatsu	2008	J2 League	37	1	1	0	38	1
Thespa Kusatsu	2009	J2 League	26	0	1	0	27	0
Career total			199	7	11	0	210	7
