= Joe Turner (jazz pianist) =

American jazz pianist

- Born: Joseph H. Turner; November 3, 1907; Baltimore, Maryland, U.S.
- Died: July 21, 1990 (aged 82) Paris, France
- Genres: Jazz, stride
- Occupation: Musician
- Instrument: Piano

Joseph H. Turner (November 3, 1907 – July 21, 1990) was an American jazz pianist.

== Biography ==
One of the masters of the stride piano style associated with Harlem, New York City, Turner gained his first big musical break in 1928 when he was hired for the Benny Carter Orchestra. Another break was his work accompanying Adelaide Hall, sometimes alongside Art Tatum, in the early 1930s. He also played with Louis Armstrong. After World War II, he settled in Europe, living in Paris from 1962, appeared regularly on French national television and released over a dozen albums. He played at La Calavados, a nightclub situated near the Champs-Élysées until his death from a heart attack in 1990, at the age of 82.
