= Mac Kac =

French drummer (1920–1987)

- Born: Jean-Baptiste Reilles; 29 May 1920; Toulouse, France
- Died: 17 August 1987 (aged 67); Sète, France
- Resting place: Cimetière du Py
- Occupation(s): Drummer composer singer
- Years active: 1935–83

Jean-Baptiste Reilles (29 May 1920 – 17 August 1987), whose stage name was Mac Kac, was a French jazz drummer. He was known for being one of the first to release a rock and roll album in French.

== Biography ==
Mac Kac had Catalan roots and came from a Manouche family. His career began in the mid-1930s in Toulouse. Reilles played in the mid-1940s in Michel de Villers orchestra and quintet, with whom he participated on the swing record How High the Moon. During this time he also worked with Big Boy Goudie and George Johnson, in the early 50s with Raymond Le Sénéchal, Guy Lafitte / Peanuts Holland, Bernard Peiffer and His Saint Germain Des Pres Orchestra and in the trio with Jean-Marie Ingrand and further with Stéphane Grappelli, Jean-Pierre Sasson and Maxim Saury. In 1955 he was a member of Jay Cameron's International Sax band and the Don Rendell / Bobby Jaspar Combo. In the 1950s he worked with Buck Clayton, Sacha Distel, Lionel Hampton, Peanuts Holland, Guy Lafitte, Les Blue Stars, Sammy Price, Christian Garros, Michel Attenoux and Henri Salvador (Salvador Plays the Blues). In 1957 he recorded for Atlantic Records the album Mac-Kac & His French Rock & Roll. This was followed from 1960 to 1962, by a series of singles and EPs for the label Fontana. He also appeared regularly at the Parisian Club Saint-Germain with Pierre Cullaz and Pierre Simonian. His last recordings were made in 1983 with the Orchestra of Jo Privat (Deux guitars et un violon). In the field of jazz, he was involved since 1946 in 42 recording sessions.
