= Geo Daly =

French jazz vibraphonist

Geo Daly (April 16, 1923, in Bois Colombes – June 1, 1999, in Sète) was a French jazz vibraphonist.

Daly started out as an accordionist, playing professionally on the accordion from 1939 to 1947. After picking up vibraphone, he played with Don Byas, Bill Coleman, and Bernard Peiffer in the late 1940s. In 1952, he became the house vibraphonist at the Club Saint-Germain in Paris, where he played with Marcel Bianchi, Claude Bolling, Michel De Villers, Roy Eldridge, Duke Ellington, Andre Persiany, Dave Pochonet, and Lester Young over the course of the next decade. In 1966 he recorded with Boulou Ferré, and was a member of Les Petits Français with Moustache and Michel Attenoux in the late 1970s.
