= Art Simmons =

American jazz pianist

Arthur Eugene Simmons (February 5, 1926 – April 23, 2018) was an American jazz pianist.

Simmons was born in Glen White, West Virginia, in February 1926. He played in a band while serving in the U.S. military in 1946, then remained in Germany after the war, studying music, and moved to Paris in 1949. There he studied at the Paris Conservatory and the Ecole Normale de Musique, playing with Charlie Parker and Kenny Clarke at the Paris Jazz Festival; he also played with Aaron Bridgers, Don Byas, Robert Mavounzy, and Nelson Williams. Simmons led his own group at the Ringside Club in 1951. In the early 1950s he played with Dizzy Gillespie and Quincy Jones, and toured London with singers such as Bertice Reading. As resident pianist at the Mars Club, he worked with Michel Gaudry, Pierre Cullaz, and Elek Bacsik, and accompanied touring singers such as Carmen McRae and Billie Holiday (1958). In the early 1960s he played in a duo with Art Taylor.

Simmons also did arranging work for Barclay Records. In 1971 he played in Spain; following this he returned to the United States and retired. He died on April 23, 2018, at the age of 92 at his home in Beckley, West Virginia.

== Discography ==
- Boogie Woogie (Mercury Wing, 1955)
- Art Simmons Quartet (Boîte à Musique LD320, 1956)
