= Jacques Loussier Trio =

French jazz trio

The Jacques Loussier Trio was a French Third Stream jazz piano trio, led by pianist Jacques Loussier, that became known for its jazz interpretations of European classical music. They were colloquially known in France as "le trio Play Bach" after the title of their first LPs.

The trio was formed in 1959 by Loussier, bass player Pierre Michelot and percussionist Christian Garros. They reworked mostly Baroque music, in particular that by Johann Sebastian Bach but also by Vivaldi and other composers, to fit their own style and instruments.

The group was commercially successful but less popular with critics and jazz purists. They toured Germany in 1966.

In 1985, Loussier formed a new trio with percussionist André Arpino and double-bassist Vincent Charbonnier. In 1997 the latter role was taken over by Benoit Dunoyer de Segonzac.

== Selected discography ==
- 2014: Concertos pour violon no 1 et no 2 (Naxos CD 8.573200, avec sonate de Ignacy Jan Paderewski sur le même album)
- 2006: Bach: The Brandenburgs (Telarc CD-83644)
- 2005: Mozart Piano Concertos 20/23 (Telarc CD-83628)
- 2004: Impressions of Chopin's Nocturnes (Telarc CD-83602)
- 2003: Beethoven: Allegretto from Symphony No. 7: Theme and Variations (Telarc CD-83580)
- 2002: Handel: Water Music & Royal Fireworks (Telarc CD 83544)
- 2001: Baroque Favorites. Jazz Improvisations: Works by Handel, Marais, Scarlatti, Marcello, Albinoni (Telarc CD 83516)
- 2000: Play Bach No. 5 (Decca 159 194-2)
- 2000: Play Bach aux Champs Élysées (Decca)
- 2000: Play Bach No. 4 (Decca 157 893-2)
- 2000: Play Bach No. 3 (Decca 157 892-2)
- 2000: Play Bach No. 2 (Decca 157 562-2)
- 2000: Play Bach No. 1 (Decca 157 561-2)
- 2000: Plays Debussy (Telarc CD 83511)
- 2000: Bach's Goldberg Variations (Telarc CD 83479)
- 2000: Bach Book 40th Anniversary (Telarc CD 83474), compilation Play Bach 93
- 1999: Ravel's Bolero (Telarc CD 83466)
- 1998: Satie (Telarc CD 83431)
- 1997: Jacques Loussier Plays Vivaldi (Telarc CD 83417)
- 1995: Jacques Loussier Plays Bach (Telarc), compilation Play Bach 93 et Les Thèmes en Ré (Note Productions)
- 1994: Play Bach Aujourd'hui Les Thèmes en Ré (Note Productions CD 437000-4)
- 1993: Play Bach 93 Volume 1 (Note Productions CD 437000-2)
- 1993: Play Bach 93 Volume 2 (Note Productions CD 437000-3)
- 1990: Lumières, Messe baroque du xxie siècle (Decca CD 425217-2)
- 1988: The Greatest Bach Partita No.1 in B Flat Major BWV 825 – Orchestral Suite No. 2 in B Minor BWV 1067 (Limelight CD 844 059-2, Decca Record Company)
- 1988: Brandenburg Concertos (Limelight-Japan CD 844 058-2, Decca Record Company)
- 1987: Bach to Bach (Start CD Original Live in Japan SMCD 19)
- 1987: Jacques Loussier Live in Japan (King Records Japan CD original Live K32Y 6172)
- 1986: Lumières "Messe Baroque du xxie siècle" (Note Productions CD DECCA NL 425 217-2)
- 1986: Bach to the Future (Start CD SCD2)
- 1985: The Best of Play Bach (Start STL6)
- 1982: Pagan Moon (CBS CB271)
- 1979: Pulsion sous la mer (Decca 844 060-2)
- 1979: Pulsion (CBS 84078)
- 1974: Jacques Loussier et le Royal Philharmonic Orchestra (Decca PFS 4176)
- 1974: The Jacques Loussier Trio In Concert at the Royal Festival Hall (Philips 6370 550 D)
- 1973: Jacques Loussier Trio "6 Master Pieces" (Philips 6321-100)
- 1972: Dark of the Sun (MGM SE-4544ST)
- 1965: Play Bach aux Champs-Élysées (coffret Decca, deux albums, SSL40.148)
- 1964: Play Bach No. 5 (Decca SSL 40.205 S)
- 1963: Play Bach No. 4 (Decca SSL 40.516)
- 1962: Jacques Loussier Joue Kurt Weill (RCA 430-071)
- 1961: Play Bach No. 3 (Decca SSL 40 507)
- 1960: Play Bach No. 2 (Decca SSL 40 502)
- 1959: Play Bach No. 1 (Decca SS 40 500)
