= Jimmy Davis (songwriter) =

American composer (1915–1997)

- Also known as: Jimmy "Loverman" Davis
- Born: James Edward Davis; 1915; Madison, Georgia, United States
- Died: 1997 (age 82) Paris, France
- Genres: Jazz; Chanson
- Occupations: Songwriter, composer, singer, musician, actor
- Instrument: piano
- Years active: 1940s–1970s

James Edward Davis (1915 – 1997) was an American songwriter, composer, singer, pianist and actor. He co-wrote the song "Lover Man (Oh, Where Can You Be?)".

Davis was born in Madison, Georgia. He and his family moved to Gary, Illinois, and then to Englewood, New Jersey, where he completed his high school education. Being musically gifted, he was accepted into the Juilliard School in New York to study piano and composition, his fees being paid by a benefactress.

In the late 1930s he wrote the song "Lover Man (Oh, Where Can You Be?)" with Ram Ramirez but could not initially place it, until he offered it to Billie Holiday in 1942. Because of the 1942–44 musicians' strike Holiday didn't record the song until October 1944, and although at first only a minor hit it soon achieved widespread success and went on to become a jazz standard, recorded by numerous artists including Linda Ronstadt, Barbra Streisand and Petula Clark.

During the early 1940s Davis struggled to make a living as a songwriter and supplemented his meagre royalties by giving piano lessons. He was drafted in 1942, but Davis, a member of the National Association for the Advancement of Colored People (NAACP), refused to be enlisted into a segregated regiment and demanded either exemption or service in the nonsegregated Canadian army. After a series of unsuccessful representations to the authorities, which drew press coverage and the support of several public figures, he decided not to report for duty and was imprisoned for thirteen days. He was then inducted into the army and served for three and a half years. His morale and health suffered though, as he revealed in letters to the writer and poet Langston Hughes with whom he would maintain a 25-year correspondence until Hughes died in 1967.

In March 1945, Davis, then a warrant officer attached to an army musical unit, was sent to France for six months, where he registered for a course on French language and culture open to American soldiers at the University of Paris. He wrote to Hughes that Paris "was exactly what the doctor ordered". Upon his return to the United States at the end of 1945 he was discharged from the army and left for Hollywood, where he joined the Actors' Laboratory Theatre, taking a course on acting. He tried to pursue a career in acting but was offered only stereotypical racial roles, and at the end of 1947 he emigrated to France.

Davis was warmly welcomed in Paris, partly due to the fame of the song "Lover Man", and was described by the influential French critic and writer Boris Vian in Jazz Hot as "the youngest and most sympathetic of the American composers". He began to style himself Jimmy "Lover Man" Davis and entered a highly creative period, writing a number of songs and placing them with major French performers, such as Yves Montand ("J'ai de la veine"), Maurice Chevalier ("Trinque, trinque [À la tienne]"), and Joséphine Baker ("You're the Greatest Love"). His songwriting royalties were still insufficient to live on, so he began singing his own songs in solo performances, touring through France, Italy, Holland, Spain, Switzerland and other countries.

In 1954 he released an album, Jimmy "Loverman" Davis Chante Jimmy "Loverman" Davis, featuring songs all co-written by himself, backed by a quartet that included his friend and fellow expatriate Aaron Bridgers on piano and the French saxophonist Michel de Villers.

Apart from his musical work, Davis appeared in plays, including Pas de week-end pour un espion and Des souris et des hommes (Of Mice and Men), and in the films La Putain respectueuse (1952, uncredited), Mélodie en sous-sol (Any Number Can Win) (1962, as Sam), and Je t'aime moi non plus (1976, as Moïse).

Davis died in Paris in 1997. After a funeral service at the American Church in Paris, his ashes were interred in a cemetery in Auvergne.

François Grosjean has written a 66-page biography of Jimmy Davis that can be downloaded from his website: https://www.francoisgrosjean.ch/In_Search_of_Jimmy_Davis.pdf

== Discography ==
- "Frimousse" ("Musetto") (Pierre Saka, Domenico Modugno) c/w "Si j'avais une amie" c/w "Tout d'une pièce" c/w "Tango picasso" (1956, La Voix de son Maître, 7 EGF 241, 45 rpm EP)
- "Tango Picasso" c/w "Tout d'une pièce" with the Jo Moutet Orchestra (1957, La voix de son maître, 7 GF 396)
- "Frimousse" c/w "Si j'avais une amie" with the Jo Moutet Orchestra (1957, La voix de son maître, 7 GF 397)
- "Je cherche une belle" (Henri Kubnick, Lee David) c/w "Si par bonheur" c/w "C'est beau" c/w "Miam, miam, miam" with the Jo Moutet Orchestra (La Voix de son Maître / Pathe-Marconi, 7 EGF 268, 45 rpm EP)
- Jimmy "Loverman" Davis Chante Jimmy "Loverman" Davis (1954, TCV 40, 10-inch album)

"Loverman", "J'ai de la veine", "Blue Valley", "C'est beau", "Why a Good Girl Is Hard to Find", "Un dia sin ti", "Amour est venu sous mon toit", "Darling You Are So Delicious", "Un p'tit coup de chapeau", "Sugar, Sugar Lady"

== Songs ==
- "Amour est venu sous mon toit" (Davis, H. Lemarchand)
- "Blue Valley" (Davis, E. D. Russell Daville)
- "C'est beau" (Davis, Pierre Delanoë), also performed by Lucienne Delyle
- "Cailloux" (Davis, Simone Gaffie, Raymond Lavigne)
- "Darling You're So Delicious" (Davis, Walter Bishop)
- "I Feel Love" (Davis, Saka)
- "I'll Believe the Gypsy" (Davis)
- "J'ai de la veine" ("I'm the Luckiest Fool") (Davis, Max François), also performed by José Bartel, Yves Montand
- "Let's Knock Ourselves Out" (Davis, Juan Tizol)
- "Lover Man (Oh, Where Can You Be?)" (Davis, Ramirez) (James Sherman is often co-credited)
- "Miam, miam, miam" (Davis, Lemarchand)
- "Nous t'acclamons seigneur" (Davis, Maurice Boubert), performed by Les Capresses
- "Shake Baby Shake" (Davis, Gaffie)
- "Si j'avais une amie" (Davis, François)
- "Si par bonheur" (Davis, Saka), performed by Georges Jouvin
- "Sugar, Sugar Lady" (Davis)
- "Tonight's My Night" (Davis, Allen Julian Orange, Robert S Wilson), performed by Roscoe Shelton
- "Tango Picasso" (Davis, Nicolas Bataille, A. Viala)
- "The Blues Jumped Out and Got Me" (Davis, Jack Hoffman), performed by Bill Coleman, Benny Goodman
- "Tout d'une pièce" ("De una vez") (Davis, Georges Coulonges, Amoros Francisco Ribe)
- "Trinque, trinque (À la tienne)" (Davis, Nathan Korb), performed by Maurice Chevalier, Jean Bretonniere, Camille Sauvage
- "Un dia sin ti" (Davis, Segura)
- "Un p'tit coup de chapeau" (Davis, Philippe-Gérard)
- "Viens chez moi" (Davis, Jacques Hourdeaux)
- "You're the Greatest Love" (Davis, Jo Bouillon, Pierre Guillermin), performed by Josephine Baker
- "Why Is a Good Girl So Hard to Find" (Davis), also performed (as "Why Is a Good Man So Hard to Find") by Colette Magny
