= Buddy Banks (bassist) =

- Born: Alvin Banks; January 15, 1927; St. Thomas, Ontario, Canada
- Died: August 7, 2005 (aged 78) Las Vegas, Nevada, U.S.
- Genres: Jazz
- Occupation: Bassist
- Instrument: double-bass

Alvin "Buddy" Banks (January 15, 1927 – August 7, 2005) was a Canadian-born American jazz double-bassist.

== Early life ==
Born in St. Thomas, Ontario, Banks grew up in the United States and became interested in music during high school. He began as a pianist before switching to saxophone. During World War II, Banks joined the United States Army Band as a bass player.

== Career ==
Banks played for the 5th Cavalcade of Jazz at Wrigley Field in Los Angeles on July 10, 1949, along with Lionel Hampton, Jimmy Witherspoon, and Big Jay McNeely. Banks made his first appearance on record was in Vienna with Thurmond Young; this group also played live at the Colored Club. He played in Paris with Gerry Wiggins in 1950, and then with Bill Coleman in Bern, Switzerland, Belgium, and Le Havre, France. After problems with his passport in Switzerland, he left for Paris in 1953, where he recorded often with expatriate American jazz musicians as well as local performers. These include Hazel Scott, Buck Clayton, Lionel Hampton, Mezz Mezzrow, Don Byas, Albert Nicholas, and André Persiany. He toured with Michel Attenoux and with Sidney Bechet through Western and Central Europe in 1954.
