= Buddy Banks =

Buddy Banks may refer to:

- Buddy Banks (saxophonist) (1909–1991), American jazz tenor saxophonist, pianist, and bandleader
- Buddy Banks (bassist) (1927–2005), Canadian jazz double-bassist
