= Pierre Michelot =

French jazz double bass player and arranger (1928–2005)

Background information
- Born: 3 March 1928; Saint-Denis, Seine-Saint-Denis, Paris, France
- Died: 3 July 2005 (aged 77); Paris, France
- Genres: Jazz
- Occupation(s): Musician, arranger
- Instrument: Double bass
- Labels: Fontana
- Formerly of: The Jacques Loussier Trio

Pierre Michelot (3 March 1928 – 3 July 2005) was a French jazz double bass player and arranger.

== Early life ==
Michelot was born in Saint-Denis, Seine-Saint-Denis, Paris on 3 March 1928. He studied piano from 1936 to 1938, and switched to playing bass at age 16.

== Later life and career ==
He played and recorded with visiting American musicians in Paris. Michelot "played with Rex Stewart (1948), performed at Frisco's in Paris with Kenny Clarke (summer 1949), and joined Clarke in a band accompanying Coleman Hawkins (winter 1949–50), with whom he recorded; in 1949 he also recorded with Clarke in an ad hoc band led by Sidney Bechet."

During his career, Michelot also performed with Django Reinhardt, Stéphane Grappelli, Don Byas, Thelonious Monk, Lester Young, Dexter Gordon, Stan Getz, Bud Powell, Zoot Sims, Dizzy Gillespie, and Chet Baker.

In a 1957 collaboration with Miles Davis, Michelot took part in creating the soundtrack of Ascenseur pour l'échafaud. He was a member of the Jacques Loussier Trio, known for the Play Bach album series from 1959. For two decades beginning in the early '60s, he concentrated on arranging and studio work. He also appeared in the 1986 film Round Midnight.

In later life, Michelot suffered from Alzheimer's disease. He died of Alzheimer's in Paris on 3 July 2005.

== Discography ==
=== As leader ===
- Jazz at the Blue Note with Maurice Vander, Kenny Clarke, (Fontana, 1961)
- Round About A Bass (Mercury, 1963)
- Piano for Dance with Steve Anderson, Kenny Clarke, (Musidisc, 1968)
- Al in Paris with Al Haig (Musica, 1979)
- Live Au Dreher with Walter Davis, Kenny Clarke (Night and Day, 1981)
- Vander Michelot Lubat (Owl, 1985)
- Bass & Bosses (EmArcy, 1990)
- Viaggio with Richard Galliano (Dreyfus, 1993)
- Nougaro Sans Paroles with Maurice Vander, Bernard Lubat (Sergeant Major, 2000)

With Daniel Humair & Rene Urtreger

- Hum! (Vega 1960)
- Urtreger Michelot Humair (Carlyne, Music 1979)
- Hum!: Live at Club Saint-Germain-Des-Pres & Two Radio Broadcasts (Fresh Sound 2018)

With Jacques Loussier and Christian Garros

- Play Bach No. 1 (Decca, 1959)
- Play Bach No. 2 (Decca, 1960)
- Play Bach No. 3 (Decca, 1962)
- Play Bach No. 4 (Decca, 1963)
- Concert in Jazz: Play Bach (Decca, 1965)
- Play Bach Aux Champs Elysees (Decca, 1965)
- Play Bach Aux Champs Elysees No. 2 (Decca, 1965)
- Play Bach No. 5 (Decca, 1968)
- Play Bach & Vol. 1 Portrait of Jacques Loussier (London, 1965)
- Play Bach No. 2 Portrait of Jacques Loussier (London, 1965)

=== As sideman ===
With Claude Bolling

- French Jazz (Bally, 1956)
- Les Succes de Duke Ellington (Le Club Francais Du Disque, 1956)
- Les Succes de La Nouvelle Orleans (Le Club Francais Du Disque, 1958)

With Clifford Brown

- Clifford Brown Quartet (Vogue, 1954)
- Blue and Brown & I Can Dream Can't I (Vogue, 1955)
- The Clifford Brown Big Band in Paris (Prestige, 1970)
- The Clifford Brown Quartet in Paris (Prestige, 1970)
- The Clifford Brown Sextet in Paris (Prestige, 1970)
- Clifford Brown in Paris (Prestige, 1972)

With Sidney Bechet

- Sidney Bechet Martial Solal (Swing, 1957)
- 1949 (Barclay, 1972)
- Spirits of New Orleans (Vogue, 1993)
- Sidney Bechet et Claude Luter (Gitanes Jazz/Universal/EmArcy, 2000)

With Don Byas

- Favorites (Seeco, 1952)
- Memorial (Vogue, 1973)
- Don Byas (Inner City, 1980)
- Yesterdays (Moon 1989)
- Lover Man (Vogue, 1993)

With Miles Davis

- Ascenseur pour l'échafaud (Fontana, 1958)
- Jazz Sur L'ecran (Fontana, 1959)
- Jazz Track (Columbia, 1959)
- Jazz On the Screen (Fontana, 1965)
- The Complete Amsterdam Concert (Celluloid, 1984)

With France Gall

- N'Ecoute Pas Les Idoles (Philips, 1964)
- Laisse Tomber Les Filles (Philips, 1964)
- Poupee De Cire Poupee De Son (Philips, 1965)
- L'Amerique (Philips, 1965)
- Baby Pop (Philips, 1966)
- Les Sucettes (Philips, 1966)

With Serge Gainsbourg

- Bande Originale Du Film L'eau A La Bouche (Philips, 1960)
- Romantique 60 (Philips, 1960)
- Gainsbourg Percussions (Philips, 1964)
- No. 2 (Hallmark 2001)
- Du Chant A La Une!... (Philips/Mercury/Universal, 2001)

With Stan Getz

- With European Friends (LRC, 1985)
- In Paris 1958–1959 (Royal, 1987)
- Pennies from Heaven (Eclipse, 1990)
- Sweetie Pie (Philology, 1992)
- 1959 (Fremeaux, 2018)

With Dizzy Gillespie

- Dizzy Gillespie Play & Sing in Paris (Vogue, 1952)
- Plays in Paris (Vogue, 1953)
- Sweet Lorraine & Dizzy Does It (Jazz Selection, 1954)
- Jazz from Paris: Dizzy and Django (Verve, 1957)
- Dizzy (Vogue, 1960)
- Dizzy Gillespie + The Double Six of Paris (Philips, 1963)
- Havin' a Good Time in Paris Vol. 1 (Jazz Legacy, 1979)
- Europa Jazz (1981)

With Dexter Gordon

- Our Man in Paris (Blue Note, 1963)
- The Other Side of Round Midnight (Blue Note, 1986)
- Ballads (Blue Note, 1991)

With Coleman Hawkins

- Bean and the Boys (Prestige, 1970)
- Picasso (1929-1949) (Giants of Jazz, 1992)
- Lausanne 1949 (TCB, 1999)
- Dear Old Southland (Membran, 2005)

With Andre Hodeir

- Jazz et Jazz (Fontana, 1960)
- Saint-Tropez Blues (Fontana, 1960)
- Anna Livia Plurabelle (Philips, 1966)

With Jacques Loussier and Royal Philharmonic Orchestra

- Bach Brandenburg Concerto No. 2 Etude Pour Trio (Decca, 1972)
- Bach's Brandenburg Concerto No. 5 (Decca, 1969)
- Play Bach Fur Den Kenner Brandenburgisches Konzert Nr. 5 (Decca, 1970)

With Claude Nougaro

- No. 2 (Philips, 1963)
- Bleu Blanc Blues (Barclay, 1985)
- Sur Scene Olympia 85 (Barclay, 1986)
- Nougayork (WEA, 1987)
- Octobre 1985 Concert Integral (Mercury, 2016)

With Bud Powell

- Memorial Oscar Pettiford (Vogue, 1960)
- A Portrait of Thelonious (Columbia, 1965)
- Blue Note Cafe Paris 1961 (ESP Disk, 1968)
- Bud in Paris (EPM Musique/Xanadu, 1979)
- A Tribute to Cannonball (Columbia, 1979)
- Bud Powell Vol. 2 (Jazz Reactivation, 1983)

With Sammy Price

- U.S.I.S Blues & Hot Club Boogie (Ducretet Thomson, 1956)
- Sammy Price Avec Lucky Thompson (Polydor, 1957)
- 1956 Boogie-Woogie A La Parisienne (Pathe Marconi, 2002)

With Stephane Grappelli

- Stephane Grappelly et Son Quartette (Barclay, 1957)
- Tea for Two (EMI, 1978)
- Menuhin & Grappelli Play Jealousy & Other Great Standards (EMI, 1988)
- Stephane Grappelli (Gitanes Jazz/Verve, 1991)
- Puttin' On the Ritz (HMV Classics, 1999)
- Improvisations (EmArcy, 2000)

With Django Reinhardt

- The Great Artistry of Django Reinhardt (Clef, 1953)
- Jazz from Paris (Clef, 1954)
- Django Reinhardt (Decca, 1961)
- Memorial (Vogue, 1966)
- Django Reinhardt et Son Quintette (Decca, 1966)
- Bruxelles 21 Mai 1947 Paris 11 Mai 1951 Vol. 6 (Decca, 1973)
- Django Reinhardt Au Club St-Germain-Des-Pres (Nec Plus Ultra, 1983)
- Inedits Vol. 2 (Nec Plus Ultra, 1984)
- Nuages (Gitanes Jazz, 2002)
- Djangology (Cleopatra, 2013)

With Zoot Sims

- Night and Day & Slingin' Hasch (Vogue, 1950)
- Zoot Sims Quartet (Discovery, 1951)
- Zoot Sims Goes to Town (Vogue, 1973)
- Brother in Swing (Inner City, 1979)
- Zoot Sims & Frank Rosolino (Vogue, 1986)
- Zoot Sims in Paris (Vogue, 1995)

With others

- Cat Anderson, Old Folks (All Life, 1980)
- Marcel Azzola, L'Accordeoniste: Hommage a Edith Piaf (Verve, 1994)
- Elek Bacsik, The Electric Guitar of The Eclectic Elek Bacsik (Fontana, 1962)
- Chet Baker, Europa Jazz (Europa Jazz 1981)
- Chet Baker, Chet Baker, Rene Urtreger, Aldo Romano, Pierre Michelot (Carlyne, 1989)
- Mickey Baker, Bossa Nova En Direct Du Bresil (Versailles, 1962)
- Art Blakey & Miles Davis, Back to Back (Fontana, 1966)
- Jeri Brown, April in Paris (Justin Time, 1996)
- Gary Burton, Live in Cannes (Jazz World 1995)
- Canadian Brass, Swingtime! (RCA Victor, 1995)
- Benny Carter, Take the A Train (Fresh Sound 1997)
- Christian Chevallier, Formidable (Columbia, 1956)
- Kenny Clarke, Plays Andre Hodeir (Philips, 1956)
- Buck Clayton, Singing Trumpets (Jazztone, 1957)
- Sonny Criss, Mr Blues Pour Flirter (Brunswick, 1963)
- Sacha Distel, Jazz D'aujourd'hui (Versailles, 1956)
- Double Six, Meet Quincy Jones (Columbia, 1960)
- Double Six, Les Double Six (Columbia, 1962)
- Christian Escoude, Plays Django Reinhardt (Gitanes Jazz, 1991)
- Samson Francois, L' Edition Integrale (EMI, 2010)
- Bud Freeman, Satin Doll (All Life, 1980)
- Richard Galliano, New Musette (Label Bleu, 1991)
- Richard Galliano, Viaggio (Dreyfus, 1993)
- Benny Golson, Blues March (Columbia, 1960)
- Benny Golson, Benny Golson & the Philadelphians (Blue Note, 1998)
- Dexter Gordon, Our Man in Paris (Blue Note, 1963)
- Johnny Griffin, Johnny Griffin & Steve Grossman Quintet (Dreyfus, 2001)
- Gigi Gryce, Jazztime Paris Vol. 1 (Blue Note, 1954)
- Gigi Gryce, Jazz Time Paris Vol. 2 (Vogue, 1954)
- Roger Guerin, Roger Guerin Benny Golson (Columbia, 1959)
- Herbie Hancock, Round Midnight (Columbia, 1986)
- Hampton Hawes & Martial Solal, Key for Two (BYG, 1979)
- Bobby Jaspar, New Jazz Vol. 1 (Swing, 1954)
- Bobby Jaspar, New Jazz Vol. 2 (Swing, 1955)
- Guy Lafitte, Nice Jazz 1978 (Black and Blue, 2017)
- Bernard Lavilliers, Voleur de Feu (Barclay, 1986)
- Lou Levy, Ya Know (Gitanes Jazz, 1993)
- Mezz Mezzrow, Swingin' with Mezz (Vogue, 1962)
- Georges Moustaki, Moustaki (Blue Silver, 1986)
- John Lewis & Sacha Distel, Afternoon in Paris (Versailles, 1957)
- John Lewis, Midnight in Paris (EmArcy, 1988)
- Colette Magny, Melocoton (CBS, 1963)
- Eddy Mitchell, Paris (RCA 1986)
- James Moody, James Moody with Strings (Blue Note, 1952)
- Bernard Peiffer, Jazz (Blue Star 1954)
- Bernard Peiffer, La Vie en Rose (Gitanes Jazz, 2001)
- Jimmy Raney, Here's That Raney Day (Ahead, 1980)
- Django Reinhardt, 1910-1953 (Vogue, 1969)
- Henri Renaud, Henri Renaud et Son Trio (Vogue, 1997)
- Henri Salvador, Salvador Plays the Blues (Fontana, 1956)
- Henri Salvador, Zorro Est Arrive & Avec La Bouche (Rigolo, 1964)
- Philippe Sarde, Beau Pere (General Music France, 1981)
- Lalo Schifrin, Film Classics (Aleph, 1998)
- Lalo Schifrin, The Bossa Nova & Latin Albums (Malanga Music, 2015)
- Brother John Sellers, Blues and Spirituals (Columbia, 1957)
- Martial Solal, Modern Sounds: France (Contemporary, 1954)
- Swingle Singers, Jazz Sebastien Bach No. 1 (Philips, 1963)
- Toots Thielemans, Toots Thielemans (Verve, 1991)
- Lucky Thompson, Lucky Thompson (Dawn, 1957)
- John Williams, Negro Spirituals (Polydor, 1964)
- Gabriel Yared, La Scarlatine (Cine Music, 1983)
- Lester Young, Prez in Europe (HighNote, 2002)
