= Alain Jean-Marie =

French pianist

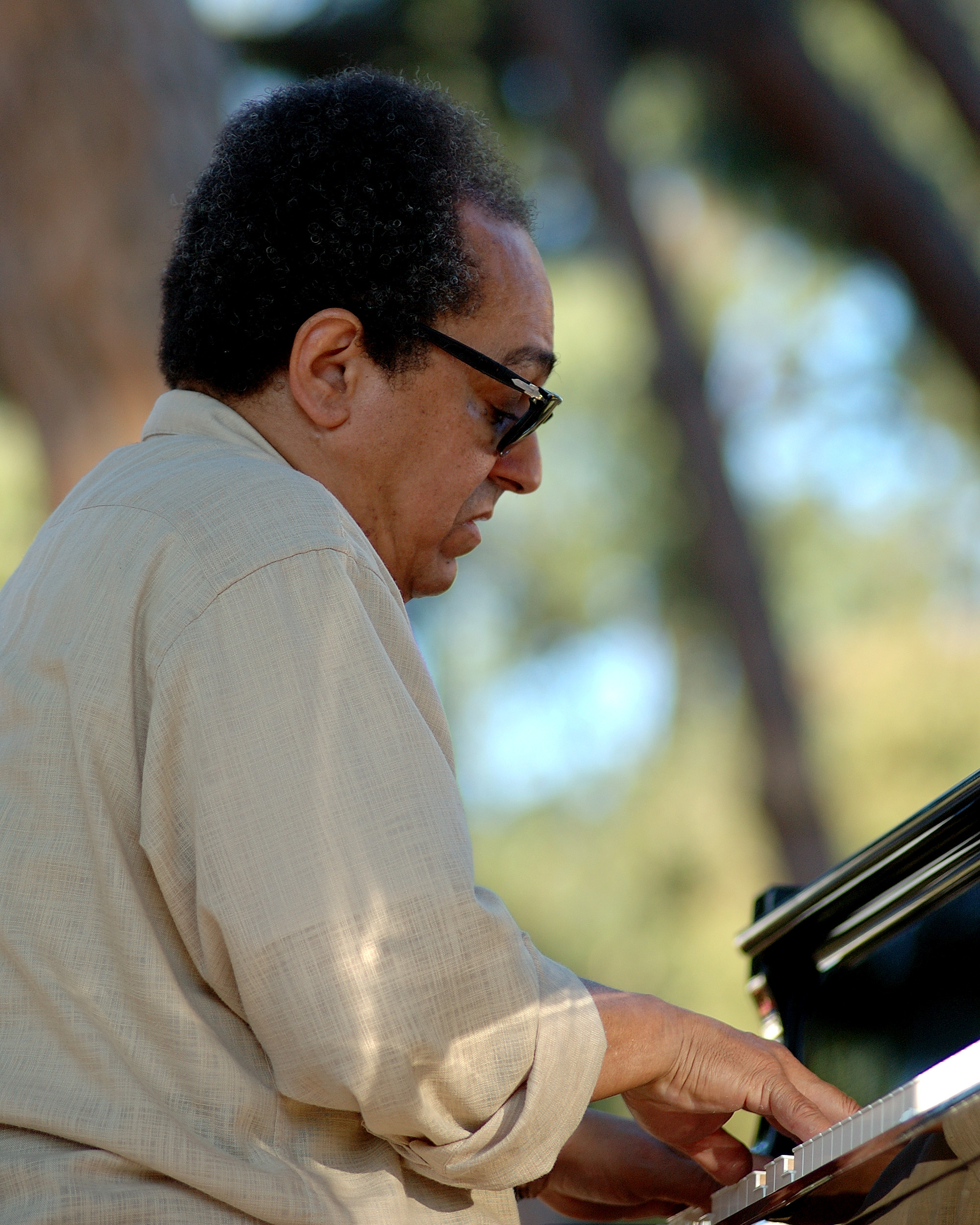
- Alain Jean-Marie in 2005

Background information
- Born: 1945; Pointe-a-Pitre, Guadeloupe, France
- Genres: Jazz, Biguine
- Occupation: Musician
- Instrument: Piano

Alain Jean-Marie (born 1945 in Pointe-a-Pitre, Guadeloupe) is a French jazz pianist.

== Biography ==
Jean-Marie taught himself to play piano from age eight. He played in dance orchestras in Guadeloupe (especially that of Robert Mavounzy), lived in Canada from 1967 to 1970 and then in the Antilles. He made his first recordings in 1969 (released in 1997 as piano biguines). At the same time he played regularly with the trio of Winston Berkley and Jean Claude Montredon. In 1973, he moved to Paris, where he accompanied jazz musicians such as Chet Baker, Sonny Stitt, Art Farmer, Johnny Griffin, Lee Konitz, and Max Roach. In 1979, he debuted with his own trio (Al Levitt on percussion, Gus Nemeth and later Riccardo Del Fra on bass). Since the 1980s, he has regularly performed with Barney Wilen, including as a duo on albums such as La Notenbleue (1986) and Dreamtime (1992). In 1986, he regularly accompanied Dee Dee Bridgewater. In 1987 he recorded the album Latin Alley in a duo with Niels-Henning Ørsted Pedersen. In 1990 he accompanied Abbey Lincoln on the album World Is Falling Down with Jackie McLean, Billy Higgins and Charlie Haden. In 1991 he played with Henri Texier (bass) and Aldo Romano (drums) on The Scene Is Clean. His 1992 trio album Biguine Reflections was influenced by the music of the Antilles as well as bebop. He also played in a trio with Gilles Naturel and John Betsch (Lazy Afternoon, 2000) and recorded his first solo album in 1999 (Afterblue, which received the Prix Boris Vian). In 2004, a second solo album, Thats What, followed.

Jean-Marie also played with Guadeloupe musicians such as the guitarist André Condouant (Clean & Class, 1997), a group of musicians from Guadeloupe under the trumpeter Franck Nicolas (Jazz Ka Philosophy) and the saxophonist Jocelyn Ménard (Men Art Works). He also worked with Jacques Vidal / Frédéric Sylvestre, with Michel Graillier (Portrait in Black & White, 1995), Boulou and Elios Ferré (Intersection, 2001, Live in Montpellier, 2006), with Xavier Richardeau, Sara Lazarus and Ted Curson (In Paris, Live At The Sunside, 2006).

In 1979, he received the Prix Django Reinhardt and in 2000 the Django d'Or.

== Discography ==
- The Complete Alain Jean-Marie Biguine Reflections (fr:Frémeaux & Associés, 1992–2013)

With Teddy Edwards

- La Villa: Live in Paris (Verve/Gitanes, 1993)

== Awards and recognition ==
- Knight of the French Order of Merit: 2012
