= Cullaz =

Cullaz is a surname of Arpitan origin. Like many Arpitan anthroponyms, the final -z only marks paroxytonic stress and should not be pronounced. Nevertheless, it is often pronounced in French through hypercorrection. Notable people with the surname include:

- Alby Cullaz (1941–1998), French jazz bassist
- Maurice Cullaz (1912–2000), French jazz critic
- Pierre Cullaz (1935–2014), French jazz guitarist
