= Dunoyer =

Dunoyer is a surname. Notable people with the surname include:

- Charles Dunoyer (1786–1862), French economist
- Philippe Dunoyer (born 1968), French politician

== See also ==
- Dunoyer de Segonzac (disambiguation)
