= Michel De Villers =

Michel De Villers (July 13, 1926, Villeneuve-sur-Lot - October 25, 1992, Mont St. Aignan) was a French jazz reedist and bandleader.

De Villers learned to play alto saxophone as a teenager, and later expanded to clarinet and baritone saxophone. He played in the latter half of the 1940s with Jean-Claude Fohrenbach, Django Reinhardt and Rex Stewart, then joined the Edward VII Theatre band in Paris. In the 1950s he worked in the bands of Geo Daly, Jack Diéval, André Persiany, and Gérard Pochonet, and also played with touring American musicians such as Buck Clayton, Bill Coleman, Jonah Jones, and Lucky Thompson. In the 1970s he was less active as a musician, working as a jazz writer and radio screenwriter. In the 1980s he became active again as an educator and performer, working later in his career with Christian Garros, Pierre Michelot, Roger Guérin, and Marc Fosset.
