= Robert Mavounzy =

Robert Mavounzy (1917–1974) was a Guadeloupean reedist.

Mavounzy was born in Colón, Panama, but his family moved to Guadeloupe when he was eleven years old. He moved to France in 1930 when he was about 13-years-old, where he played with Alexandre Stellio for several years. In the late 1930s he played with Bill Coleman and other touring Americans, and led an ensemble at the club La Cigale. Adept on both clarinet and saxophone, Mavounzy recorded in the 1940s with Django Reinhardt, Harry Cooper, and the Ensemble Swing du Hot Club Colonial. He also led his own group after World War II, which included Andre Persiany and Alain Jean-Marie as members. He died in Paris in 1974.
