= Henri Renaud =

French jazz pianist (1925–2002)

Henri Renaud (20 April 1925 in Villedieu-sur-Indre, France – 16 October 2002 in Paris) was a French jazz pianist, record producer, and record company executive.

== Biography ==
His styles reflected the decades when he was musically active: he played in the swing, bebop and cool styles. He developed a reputation internationally when he served as an ensemble-organizing point-man for visiting jazz performers from the United States.

Renaud moved to Paris in 1946 and established a career as a jazz pianist. He joined tenor-saxophonist Jean-Claude Fohrenbach's combo. During 1949 and 1950, he accompanied Don Byas, James Moody, and Roy Eldridge. In 1952, he performed with Lester Young, Sarah Vaughan, and Clifford Brown. Brown made several recordings with Renaud. In 1954, Renaud visited the United States, where he recorded. He made recordings with Milt Jackson, J. J. Johnson, Al Cohn, Oscar Pettiford, Max Roach, Frank Foster, and Bob Brookmeyer.

Upon becoming an executive for the jazz division of CBS France in 1964, he largely stopped his activity as a professional jazz pianist, but did occasional work as a film composer.

== Discography ==
=== As leader/co-leader ===
- Complete Legendary Saturne Picture Discs (Paris Jazz Corner, 1951 [2001])
- New Sound at the "Bœuf Sur Le Toit" (Fresh Sound, 1952 [1987])
- Henri Renaud quintet joue Gigi Grice avec Bobby Jaspar (Vogue, 1953 [1955]) – with Gigi Gryce, Bobby Jaspar
- Bobby Jaspar/Henri Renaud (BMG France, 1953–1954 [1998]) – with Bobby Jaspar
- Henri Renaud All Stars Vol. 1 (Swing, 1954)
- Henri Renaud All Stars Vol. 2 (Swing, 1954)
- Night Session in Paris (Le club français du disque, 1956 [1957]) – with Zoot Sims
- Henri Renaud et son orchestre (trio et octette) (Ducretet Thomson, 1957)
- Dance and Mood Music Vol. 8 (Chappell, 1969)
- Blue Cylinder (PSI, 1970)
- Jeu de l'oie (Arion, 1971) – with Georges Arvanitas, André Ceccarelli

=== As sideman ===
With Clifford Brown

- Clifford Brown Big Band in Paris (Prestige, 1953 [1970])
- Clifford Brown Quartet (Vogue, 1953)
- Clifford Brown Quartet in Paris (Prestige, 1953 [1970])
- Clifford Brown Sextet in Paris (Prestige, 1953 [1970])
- Jazz Time Paris Vol. 13 (Vogue, 1954)

With Gigi Gryce

- Jazz Time Paris Vol. 10 (Vogue, 1953) – with Clifford Brown
- Jazz Time Paris Vol. 11 (Vogue, 1954) – with Clifford Brown
- Gigi Gryce Octet (Vogue, 1954)

With Zoot Sims

- Quartet & Sextet (Vogue, 1953)
- Zoot Goes to Town: Jazz Time Paris Vol. 8 (Vogue, 1953)
- Zoot Sims avec Henri Renaud et son orchestre et Jon Eardley (Ducretet Thomson, 1956) – with Jon Eardley

With others

- Bob Brookmeyer, Bob Brookmeyer Quintet (Vogue, 1956)
- Jay Cameron, Jay Cameron's International Sax-Band (Swing, 1955)
- Jay Cameron, The Third Herdsmen: The Vogue Sessions (BMG France, 1955 [1999])
- Al Cohn, The Birdlanders Vol. 1 (Period, 1954 [1957])
- Al Cohn, The Birdlanders Vol. 2 (Period, 1954 [1957])
- Frank Foster, Frank Foster (Vogue, 1955)
- Bobby Jaspar, New Sound from Belgium Vol. 4 (Vogue, 1953)
- J. J. Johnson, Milt Jackson, A Date in New York (Inner City, 1954 [1979])
- Lee Konitz, Lee Konitz Plays: Jazz Time Paris Vol. 7 (Vogue, 1953)
- Oscar Pettiford, Oscar Pettiford Sextet (Vogue, 1954)
- René Thomas, René Thomas et son quintette (Vogue, 1955)
- Lucky Thompson, Modern Jazz Group (Le club français du disque, 1956)
- Lucky Thompson, Thompson Plays for Thomson (Ducretet Thomson, 1956) – with Emmett Berry

== See also ==
- Clifford Brown
- French jazz
