= Dunoyer de Segonzac =

Dunoyer de Segonzac may refer to

- André Dunoyer de Segonzac, French painter
- Benoit Dunoyer de Segonzac, French musician
- Louis Dunoyer de Segonzac, French physicist
