= Christian Garros =

French jazz drummer and bandleader

Christian Garros (February 17, 1920, in Paris – August 23, 1988, in Rouen) was a French jazz drummer and bandleader.

Garros began playing professionally shortly after the end of World War II, working with Django Reinhardt and Jacques Hélian. He was a regular at clubs in Paris in the 1950s, including the Club Saint-Germain, and played with Bill Coleman, Bobby Jaspar, Lee Konitz, Martial Solal, and Lucky Thompson. He played with the Birdland All Stars in 1956 and was a founding member, with Georges Arvanitas and Guy Lafitte, of the Paris Jazz Trio in 1958. In the 1960s, he recorded with Alice Babs and Duke Ellington among others, and was a session musician for film and television soundtracks directed by Michel Legrand and Quincy Jones. In 1960 he began a longtime association with Jacques Loussier, and formed the Néo Jazz Quartet in 1976 with Roger Guérin, Pierre Michelot, and Michel de Villers. In 1978 he moved to Normandy and founded the Rouen Memory Jazz Band.
