= Jacques Loussier =

French jazz pianist and composer (1934–2019)

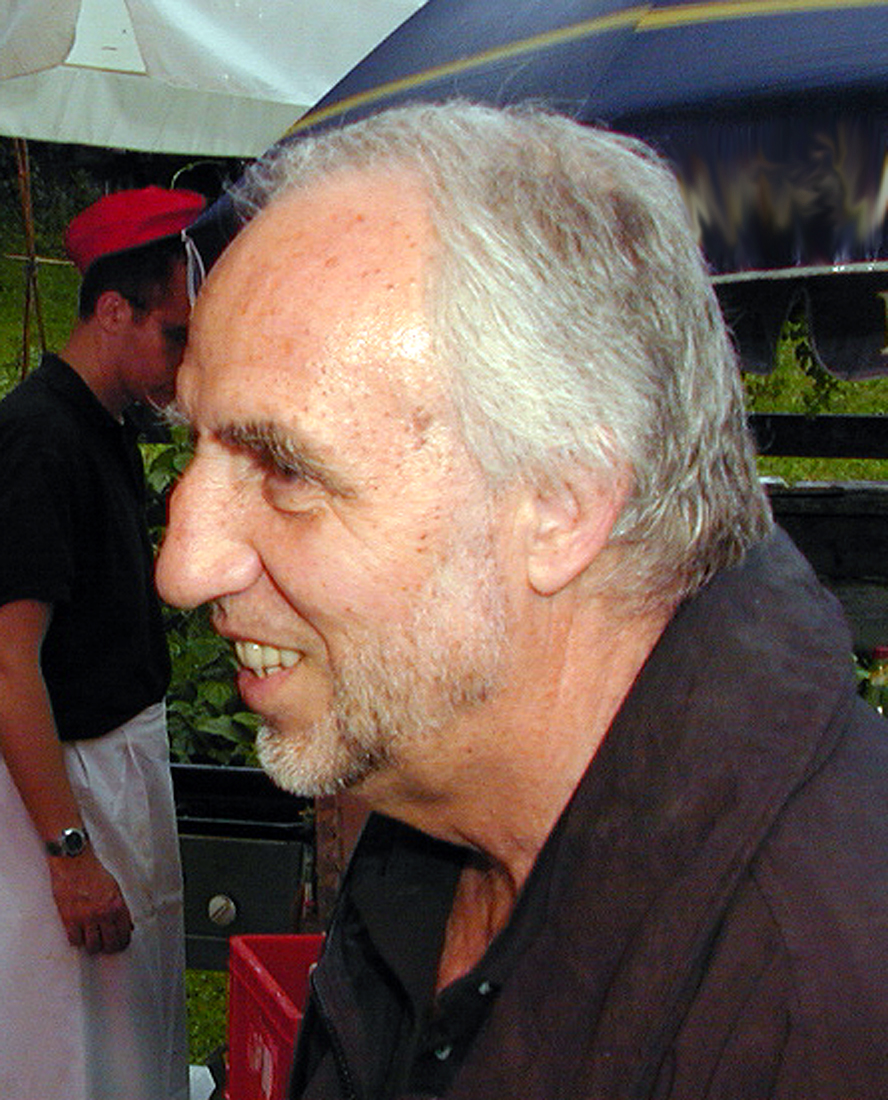
- Loussier in 2004

Background information
- Born: 26 October 1934; Angers, France
- Died: 5 March 2019 (aged 84) Blois, France
- Genres: Classical; jazz; third stream
- Occupations: Musician, composer
- Instrument: Piano
- Labels: Decca; Philips; Telarc; Naxos

Jacques Loussier (French: [lusje]; 26 October 1934 – 5 March 2019) was a French pianist and composer. He arranged jazz interpretations of many of the works of Johann Sebastian Bach, such as the Goldberg Variations. The Jacques Loussier Trio, founded in 1959, played more than 3,000 concerts and sold more than 7 million recordings—mostly in the Bach series. Loussier composed film scores and a number of classical pieces, including a Mass, a ballet, and violin concertos. His style is described as third stream, a synthesis of jazz and classical music, with an emphasis on improvisation.

== Early life and education ==
Loussier was born on 26 October 1934 in Angers, France. He started piano lessons there at age ten. When he was eleven, he heard a piece from the Notebook for Anna Magdalena Bach. In a 2003 interview, he said, "I was studying this piece and I just fell in love with it. Then I found I loved to play the music, but add my own notes, expanding the harmonies and playing around with that music." At 13, he met pianist Yves Nat in Paris, who regularly gave him projects for three months, after which he returned for another lesson.

== Career ==
Loussier began composing music while studying at the Conservatoire National Musique, having moved by then to Paris, with Nat, from the age of 16. At a competition at the conservatory, he played a prelude by Bach, and when his memory failed, he improvised. He later said that he only followed a tradition, because musicians of the 18th century—including Bach—were great improvisers. Loussier played jazz in Paris bars to finance his studies. Fusing Bach and jazz was unique at the time. After six years of study, he travelled to the Middle East and Latin America, where he was inspired by different sounds. He stayed in Cuba for a year.

Early in his career, Loussier was an accompanist for singers Frank Alamo, Charles Aznavour, Léo Ferré and Catherine Sauvage. In 1959, he formed the Jacques Loussier Trio with string bass player Pierre Michelot—who had played with Django Reinhardt and the Quintette du Hot Club de France—and percussionist Christian Garros. They used Bach's compositions as a base for jazz improvisation and made many live appearances, tours, and concerts, as well as a number of recordings. They began with Decca Records but changed to Philips/Phonogram in 1973. They sold over six million albums in 15 years. Their best-known recording is "Air on the G String", which was used to advertise Hamlet cigars in the UK for over 30 years.

In the mid-1970s, the trio was dissolved. Loussier set up his own recording studio, Studio Miraval, which opened in 1977, where he worked on compositions for acoustic and electric instruments. He recorded with musicians such as Pink Floyd, Elton John, Sting, Chris Rea, and Sade. Parts of Pink Floyd's album The Wall were recorded there.

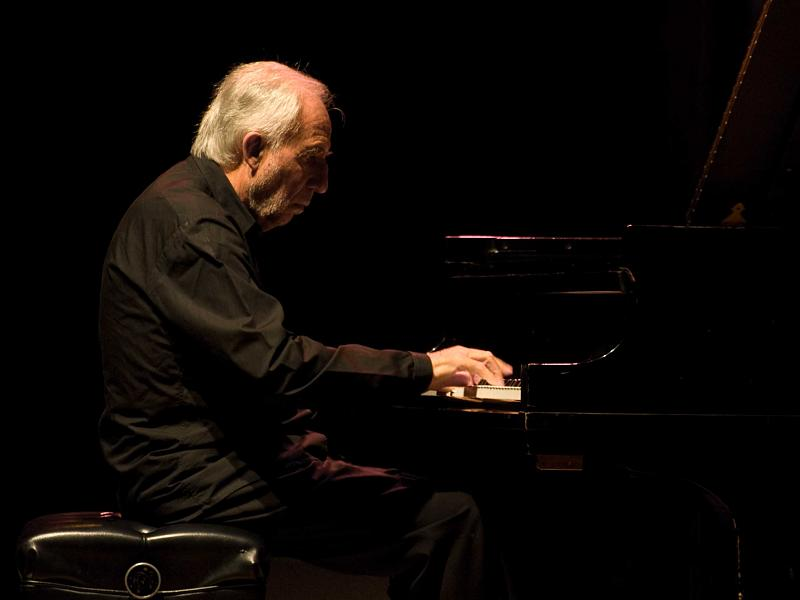
Loussier in 2008

In 1985, the tricentenary of Bach's birth, Loussier revived the trio with percussionist André Arpino and bassist Vincent Charbonnier. Bassist Benoit Dunoyer de Segonzac has also played in the trio, replacing Charbonnier—whose left hand was affected by a stroke, resulting in his being unable to continue to play the bass—on a number of albums and concerts from at least as early as 1998 (on the album Satie: Gymnopédies Gnossiennes). Besides Bach, the trio recorded interpretations of compositions by Handel, Scarlatti, Vivaldi, Mozart, Beethoven, Chopin, Satie, Debussy, Ravel, and Schumann. A 2005 recording, Take Bach, by the trio with the Pekinel sisters, features adaptations of Bach's concertos for two and three pianos. Loussier's last albums, My Personal Favorites and Beyond Bach, Other Composers I Adore, were released in 2014 on the occasion of his 80th birthday.

In March 2002, Loussier filed a $10 million lawsuit against rapper Eminem and The Marshall Mathers LP executive producer Dr. Dre, claiming that the beat for the track "Kill You" was stolen from his composition Pulsion. He demanded that all sales of the album be halted and any remaining copies destroyed. The case was settled out of court.

== Death ==
Loussier suffered a stroke during a performance at the Klavier-Festival Ruhr on 14 July 2011 and retired from the stage. He died on 5 March 2019 at the age of 84. He is survived by his wife, Elizabeth, and five children.

== Compositions ==
Loussier composed the music for over 100 films, made for cinema and television series, beginning with The Happy Sixties in 1963. These included the scores for the films Heaven on One's Head (1965), À Belles Dents (1966), The Killing Game (1967), Dark of the Sun (1968), Monique (1970) and The Man Who Went Up in Smoke (1980), the theme tune for the popular 1960s French TV series Thierry la Fronde, and the original sign-on music for La 3e chaîne, the predecessor television channel to France 3.

Loussier also composed a trumpet concerto, two violin concertos, and music for a ballet, among other pieces. His Mass, Lumières: Messe Baroque du 21e Siècle (Lights: A Baroque Mass of the 21st Century), has been compared to Leonard Bernstein's Mass.

== Recordings ==
=== Solo ===
- 1972 – Dark of the Sun (MGM) (OCLC 746223157)
- 1979 – Pulsion (CBS)
- 1979 – Pulsion/Sous la mer
- 1980 – Fréderick Chopin par Jacques Loussier (CBS)
- 1982 – Pagan Moon (CBS)
- 2004 – Impressions of Chopin's Nocturnes (Telarc CD-83602)
- 2014 – Jacques Loussier Concerto No. 1 for Violin and Percussion/Concerto No. 2 for Violin and Tabla/Ignacy Jan Paderewski/Sonata in A minor for Violin and Piano, Op. 13

=== Trio ===
- 1959 – Play Bach No. 1 (Decca SSL 40.500)
- 1960 – Play Bach No. 2 (Decca SSL 40.502)
- 1961 – Play Bach No. 3 (Decca SSL 40.507)
- 1962 – Jacques Loussier Joue Kurt Weill (RCA)
- 1963 – Play Bach No. 4 (Decca SSL 40.516)
- 1965 – Play Bach aux Champs Élysées (Decca Coffret, two albums, SSL40.148)
- 1967 – Play Bach No. 5 (Decca SSL 40.205)
- 1973 – 6 Masterpieces (Philips 6321-100) (OCLC 32213012)
- 1985 – The Best of Play Bach (Start STL6) – UK No. 58
- 1986 – Bach to the Future (Start CD SCD2) (OCLC 69664801)
- 1987 – Bach to Bach (Start CD Original Live in Japan SMCD 19) (OCLC 610851827)
- 1988 – Brandenburg Concertos (Limelight-Japan CD 844 058-2, Decca)
- 1988 – The Greatest Bach (Partita No.1 in B Flat Major BWV 825, Orchestral Suite No. 2 in B Minor BWV 1067) (Limelight CD 844 059-2, Decca)
- 1990 – Lumières: Messe Baroque du 21ième siècle (Decca CD 425217-2) (OCLC 781145359)
- 1993 – Play Bach 93 Volume 1 (Note Productions CD 437000-2) (OCLC 224188412)
- 1994 – Play Bach Aujourd'hui Les Thèmes en Ré (Note Productions CD 437000-4) (OCLC 742910090)
- 1995 – Jacques Loussier Plays Bach (Telarc), Compilation "Play Bach 93" et "Les Thèmes en Ré" (Note Productions)
- 1997 – Jacques Loussier Plays Vivaldi (Telarc CD 83417)
- 1998 – Satie (Telarc CD 83431) (OCLC 40118648)
- 1999 – Ravel's Bolero (Telarc CD 83466) (OCLC 42640414)
- 2000 – Bach's Goldberg Variations (Telarc CD 83479) (OCLC 44580698)
- 2000 – Plays Debussy (Telarc CD 83511)
- 2000 – Play Bach No. 1 (Decca 157 561–2) (OCLC 900316632)
- 2002 – Handel: Water Music & Royal Fireworks (Telarc CD 83544) (OCLC 50956101)
- 2003 – Beethoven: Allegretto from Symphony No. 7: Theme and Variations (Telarc CD-83580)
- 2004 – The Best of Play Bach (Telarc SACD-63590) (OCLC 24707934)
- 2005 – Mozart Piano Concertos 20/23 (Telarc CD-83628)
- 2007 – Encore! – Jacques Loussier Plays Bach (Telarc 83671-25) (OCLC 181101094)
- 2009 – Jacques Loussier Plays Bach: The 50th Anniversary Recording (Telarc 83693-25)
- 2011 – Schumann: Kinderszenen (Scenes From Childhood) (Telarc TEL-32270-02)
- 2014 – Beyond Bach, Other Composers I Adore (Telarc TEL-35342-02)
- 2014 – My Personal Favorites: The Jacques Loussier Trio Plays Bach (Telarc TEL-35319-02)
