= Clifford Brown Quartet =

"Jazz Time Paris" Vol. 13: Clifford "Brownie" Brown Quartet

Studio album by Clifford Brown
- Released: 1954
- Recorded: 1953
- Genres: Hard bop Bebop
- Length: 20:48
- Label: Vogue

Clifford Brown chronology
New Star on the Horizon (1953)	"Jazz Time Paris" Vol. 13: Clifford "Brownie" Brown Quartet (1954)	Memorial Album (1956)

Professional ratings
Review scores
Source	Rating
AllMusic	4.5/5 stars

Clifford Brown Quartet (Vogue Records, 1954) is a Clifford Brown album. Clifford Brown Quartet was recorded while Clifford Brown was on tour with the Lionel Hampton Band in Europe, voiding Brown's contract with Hampton. Scott Yanow's review for AllMusic describes the music on the album as "well worth hearing" and "highly recommended."

== Track listing ==
1. "It Might as Well Be Spring" (Rodgers and Hammerstein) - 4:57
2. "You're a Lucky Guy" (Sammy Cahn and Saul Chaplin) - 2:44
3. "The Song is You" (Jerome Kern and Oscar Hammerstein II) - 2:50
4. "Come Rain or Come Shine" (Harold Arlen and Johnny Mercer) - 4:09
5. "I Can Dream, Can't I?" (Sammy Fain and Irving Kahal) - 2:58
6. "Blue and Bown" (Clifford Brown) - 3:10

== Personnel ==
- Clifford Brown - trumpet
- Henri Renaud - piano
- Pierre Michelot - bass
- Benny Bennet - drums
