= Zorro (1975 Italian film) =

1975 film

- Theatrical release poster
- Directed by: Duccio Tessari
- Written by: Giorgio Arlorio
- Based on: Zorro by Johnston McCulley
- Produced by: Luciano Martino
- Starring: Alain Delon; Ottavia Piccolo; Enzo Cerusico; Giampiero Albertini; Giacomo Rossi-Stuart; Marino Masé; Moustache; Adriana Asti; Stanley Baker
- Cinematography: Giulio Albonico
- Edited by: Mario Morra
- Music by: Guido De Angelis; Maurizio De Angelis
- Production companies: Mondial Televisione Film; Les Productions Artistes Associes
- Distributed by: Titanus (Italy); United Artists (France)
- Release dates: March 5, 1975 (France); March 6, 1975 (Italy)
- Running time: 124 minutes
- Countries: Italy; France
- Languages: English; French; Italian

Zorro is a 1975 swashbuckler film directed by Duccio Tessari, based on the character created by Johnston McCulley. It stars Alain Delon in the titular role, along with Ottavia Piccolo and Stanley Baker in one of his final film performances. It was an Italian and French co-production, shot principally in Almería, Spain.

The film was released by United Artists on March 5, 1975 and was both a critical and commercial success.

== Plot ==
On the eve of his return to Spain from Alta California, Diego de la Vega meets his old friend Miguel de la Serna, who is about to take up the governorship of Nueva Aragón. His uncle Don Fernando has died of “malaria” in a malaria-free region, being replaced by the dictatorial and unscrupulous Colonel Huerta. Diego warns, in vain, the idealistic Miguel that Nueva Aragón is ruled by greed and hatred; later that very evening, Miguel is assassinated by Huerta's underlings. The dying Miguel makes Diego swear that he will pretend to be Miguel in the new governorship, gives him the signet ring he wears, but makes him swear that "the new governor will never kill". As no one has met Miguel yet, the ruse will work. Diego accepts the disguised role and terms to the dying Miguel.

As Colonel Huerta asks the local council to appoint him both military and civil governor of Nueva Aragón, Diego suddenly arrives, walking in disguised as de la Serna. While lulling Colonel Huerta's fears by pretending to be a useless fop, Diego learns that Huerta is a cruel despot, as well as a dangerous swordsman.

With Joaquín, Miguel's devoted mute servant, and aided by Assassin, the late Don Fernando's Great Dane, Diego goes among the people and learns how miserable and afraid they are: the innocent are punished for speaking the truth, while the guilty, who cheat unmercifully, are labelled as “respectable” citizens.

Inspired by street urchin Chico's tales of Zorro, a freedom-loving fox spirit, Diego creates his own black-garbed alter ego and launches a campaign for justice with an action-packed marketplace brawl. Outwitting Huerta and his men time and again, Diego finally stages his own kidnapping (as the region's governor and as Zorro), both to free wrongfully held prisoners and to trick Colonel Huerta into thinking both are now dead.

Huerta, feeling himself safe at last, forces aristocrat Hortensia Polido to the marriage altar. He shoots Brother Francisco when the monk leads protesters to the church steps, just as Zorro reappears. Brother Francisco's murder finally absolves Diego of his vow to his dead friend Miguel, leaving Zorro free to engage Huerta in an action-packed swordplay duel-to-the-death, at which he is victorious following a lengthy battle.

== Cast ==
- Alain Delon as Diego de la Vega / Zorro / the false Don Miguel de la Serna
- Stanley Baker as Colonel Joaquin Huerta
- Ottavia Piccolo as Hortensia Pulido
- Enzo Cerusico as Bernardo
- Adriana Asti as Aunt Carmen
- Giampiero Albertini as Brother Francisco
- Moustache as Sergeant García
- Giacomo Rossi-Stuart as Kapitän Fritz von Markel
- Marino Masé as the real Miguel de la Serna
- Raika Juri as Señora de la Serna
- Paulino Rito as Chico
- Vicente Roca as Ramiro Valdez

== Production ==
The film was made in part because Alain Delon had enjoyed making the swashbuckler The Black Tulip in 1964 and wanted to do another one. Filming began in July 1974 in Almería, Spain, with most of the crew being from Italy. Some studio work was done in Rome. The film's lengthy sword duel at the end was inspired by Scaramouche (1952).

== Release ==
Zorro was released in France on 5 March 1975 and in Italy on 6 March. It was released in the United States in June 1976 by Allied Artists.

It was also one of the first Western-produced films to be screened in the People's Republic of China, after the Cultural Revolution. It was released there in 1978, and was purportedly seen by more than 70 million viewers.
