= Sam Shaw (photographer) =

American photographer, filmmaker, painter

- Born: January 15, 1912; New York City, New York, U.S.
- Died: April 5, 1999 (aged 87); Westwood, New Jersey, U.S.
- Known for: Photography, filmmaking
- Notable work: Paris Blues (1961), A Woman Under the Influence (1974)
- Website: shawfamilyarchives.com (Shaw Family Archives)

Sam Shaw (January 15, 1912 – April 5, 1999) was an American photographer, film producer, and artist. He is best known for his photographs of Marilyn Monroe, with whom he was a personal friend. In 1954, he created his iconic image of the actress in The Seven Year Itch standing over a subway air shaft in a billowing white dress.

== Life ==
Sam Shaw was born in Manhattan and grew up on the Lower East Side, Little Italy, and the Upper West Side neighborhoods. He showed an interest in art early on, and his illustrations were published in the DeWitt Clinton High School literary magazine The Magpie (which was later edited by fellow alumni James Baldwin and Richard Avedon, both of whom Shaw photographed).

Following high school graduation, Shaw shared a studio located above Harlem's historic Apollo Theater with his classmate Romare Bearden. Bearden and Shaw were lifelong friends. Bearden incorporated Shaw's photographs into his collages, and Bearden's watercolors were used in the opening sequence of John Cassavetes’ Gloria 1980, produced by Shaw.

== Photography ==
In the 1930s, Shaw worked as sign painter, a courtroom artist, a designer of theater lobby displays, a muralist for jazz nightclubs and bar rooms, a political and sports cartoonist for The Brooklyn Daily Eagle. He served as art director of The Daily Worker. Over time, Shaw discovered that still photograph was his preferred story-telling medium, and in the 1940s he began working as a photojournalist for magazines including Friday and Collier's. At Collier's, Shaw worked with Harry Hendersen to cross the country and document life during wartime America as part of an award-winning series. Later, his photographs also appeared in Life and Look magazines, frequently as cover images. Shaw was an early contributor to Magnum Photos, thanks to his friendship with Robert Capa.

In the 1950s and 1960s, Shaw began supplying photo coverage of movies for magazines. Shaw worked as the first of the so-called special still photographers, photojournalists on assignment both from major publications and film studios. He was known as a master of creating memorable publicity shots. With his background in art and graphic arts, Shaw took pleasure in coming up with the image that could define an entire film (and, with John Cassavetes, would often design the posters for his films). In 1951, he photographed Marlon Brando on the set of A Streetcar Named Desire wearing a torn T-shirt—a garment Brando had previously rejected as "vulgar."

Shaw first met Marilyn Monroe in 1950. The following year, during the filming of Viva Zapata!, the film's director Elia Kazan asked Marilyn to drive Shaw to and from the set (Shaw did not have a driver's license). They formed a lifelong friendship.

In 1954, Shaw worked as a still photographer on the production of Billy Wilder's The Seven Year Itch, which would see Marilyn Monroe get her final breakthrough. During filming, Shaw made his famous image of the actress in a white dress above the subway air shaft. Years earlier, in 1941, Shaw made a similar image for the cover of left-leaning Friday magazine, showing Navy men enjoying their day off at the Coney Island boardwalk and wind from a tunnel slightly lifting a woman's skirt. As soon as the publication when to press, all copies sold out. When producer Charles K. Feldman asked Shaw to create a key photo for promotion of the film, he suggested recreating this scene. The photo, which is the only staged image Shaw ever took of Monroe, was front-page news the next day in New York, Berlin, London, Paris, Rome and Tokyo. It was quickly dubbed “the shot seen ‘round the world.”

== Film ==
From the early 1960s onwards, Shaw was also active as a film producer. He produced films by director John Cassavetes, including Husbands, A Woman Under the Influence, Opening Night, and Gloria. In 1990, Romuald Karmakar made the short documentary "Sam Shaw on John Cassavetes" with him.

== Filmography ==
As director and producer

- 1978: Blondie (Documentary)
- 1969: Vince Lombardi's The Science and Art of Football

As producer

- 1980: Gloria
- 1977: Opening Night
- 1974: A Woman Under the Influence
- 1970: Husbands
- 1961: Paris Blues

As special still photographer

- 1986: Angel River
- 1986: Big Trouble
- 1984: The Purple Rose of Cairo
- 1976: The Killing of a Chinese Bookie
- 1968: Faces
- 1968: Funny Girl
- 1955: The Seven Year Itch
- 1954: Dov'è la libertà?
- 1952: Viva Zapata!
- 1951: A Streetcar Named Desire
- 1950: The Glass Menagerie

== Awards ==
- 1992: Costa Azul Award - Lifetime Achievement, Troia Film Festival, Troia, Portugal
- 1989: Audience Award, Opening Night, Barcelona Film Festival, Barcelona, Spain
- 1980: Golden Lion Award - Best Film, Gloria, Venice Film Festival, Venice, Italy
- 1977: Sponsor's Commendation, The Killing of a Chinese Bookie, The Hollywood Reporter, Sixth Annual Key Art Awards
- 1974: Top Ten Films of 1974, A Woman Under the Influence, National Board of Reviews
- 1974: The Independent Film Critics Award of Merit - Best English Language Film, A Woman Under the Influence, The Independent Film Critics
