= Paris Blues =

1961 film by Martin Ritt

- Directed by: Martin Ritt
- Written by: Walter Bernstein; Irene Kamp; Jack Sher; Lulla Rosenfeld (adaptation)
- Based on: Paris Blues; 1957 novel by Harold Flender
- Produced by: Sam Shaw (photographer)
- Starring: Paul Newman; Joanne Woodward; Sidney Poitier; Louis Armstrong; Diahann Carroll; Serge Reggiani
- Cinematography: Christian Matras
- Edited by: Roger Dwyre
- Music by: Duke Ellington
- Production companies: Pennebaker Productions; Diane Productions
- Distributed by: United Artists
- Release date: September 27, 1961 (USA)
- Running time: 98 minutes
- Country: United States
- Language: English
- Box office: $1.1 million

Paris Blues is a 1961 American musical romantic drama film directed by Martin Ritt, starring Sidney Poitier as expatriate jazz saxophonist Eddie Cook, and Paul Newman as trombone-playing Ram Bowen. The two men romance two vacationing American tourists, Connie Lampson (Diahann Carroll) and Lillian Corning (Joanne Woodward). The film also deals with American racism of the time contrasted with Paris's open acceptance of black people. It was based on the 1957 novel of the same name by Harold Flender.

The film also features trumpeter Louis Armstrong (as Wild Man Moore) and jazz pianist Aaron Bridgers; both play music within the film. It was produced by Sam Shaw (photographer), directed by Martin Ritt from a screenplay by Walter Bernstein, and with cinematography by Christian Matras. Paris Blues was released in the U.S. on September 27, 1961.

== Plot ==
On his way to see Wild Man Moore at the train station, Ram Bowen, a jazz musician living in Paris, encounters a newly arrived tourist named Connie Lampson and invites her to see him perform that night at Club 33. Connie is not interested, but her friend Lillian insists they go see him. After Ram finishes performing with Eddie, a fellow American expatriate, the four of them leave the club in the early morning. When Ram suggests that he and Connie go off to have a private breakfast together, she becomes offended, and Ram is angered at being rejected. However, Lillian, undeterred by Ram's attraction to her friend, convinces him to apologize before pursuing him. The two sleep together while Connie and Eddie continue to walk around Paris.

Over the following days the couples grow closer, but Connie is angry that Eddie has abandoned America for France, insisting that the only way race relations can improve in the U.S. is if people stay and work together in order to change things. Eddie says he is content to stay in Paris, where he experiences far less bigotry and discrimination, is able to carve out a career as a talented musician. Lillian tries to convince Ram to enter into a more committed relationship and move back to the U.S. with her. Ram, aware that she has two children from a previous marriage and lives in a small town, breaks off their relationship, telling her he is dedicated to his music. Meanwhile, Eddie and Connie declare their love for one another. They discuss getting married, but this falls through when Eddie states his refusal to live in the United States for a full year. Their hearts broken by their respective lovers, Connie and Lillian make plans to return home early.

Connie, in a desperate last attempt to reach out to Eddie, follows him to a party where she tells him she is leaving Paris for good. Unwilling to lose her, Eddie decides to return to America to join Connie, but will follow in a few weeks as he needs to wrap up his affairs in Paris before leaving. Ram attends a meeting with a record producer, Bernard, who dismisses a composition Ram has been working on, dashing his hopes of a more prominent and respected music career. However, he tells Ram that he has the potential to become a serious composer, if he works hard and truly studies music. Crushed, he tracks down Lillian, and agrees to leave for America with her. But as the women depart, Ram arrives late and tells Lillian that he will not be joining her, as he does not want to give up on his music. As the train carrying Connie and Lillian leaves the station, Ram walks away with Eddie. In the final shot, French workers cover a billboard advertising Wild Man Moore's appearance with a promo for Larousse publishing.

== Cast ==
- Paul Newman as "Ram" Bowen
- Joanne Woodward as Lillian Corning
- Sidney Poitier as Eddie Cook
- Louis Armstrong as "Wild Man" Moore
- Diahann Carroll as Connie Lampson
- Barbara Laage as Marie Séoul
- André Luguet as René Bernard
- Marie Versini as Nicole
- Moustache as Mustachio, The Drummer
- Aaron Bridgers as Pianist
- Guy Pedersen as Bass Player
- Serge Reggiani as Michel "Gypsy" Devigne
- Emilien Antille as Man With Alto Sax In Jazz Cave When Armstrong Enters
- Roger Blin as Fausto, The Moor
- Charles Bouillaud as Luggage Carrier In Train
- Michel Dacquin as Guest At Devigne's Party
- Hélène Dieudonné as The Pusher
- Michel Garland as Club 33 Customer
- René Hell as Man With Dog In The Park
- Jo Labarrère as Club 33 Customer
- Jack Lenoir as Club 33 Waiter
- Frank Maurice as Luggage Carrier On The Platform
- Niko as Ricardo
- Michel Portal as Musician
- Joseph Reinhardt (brother of Django Reinhardt) as a guest at a roof-top party (uncredited).
- Claude Rollet as Club 33 Customer
- Albert Simono as Guest At Devigne's Party
- André Tomasi as Club 33 Bartender
- María Velasco as Pianist
- Dominique Zardi

== Production ==
The film was made by Pennebaker Productions, the movie company founded by Marlon Brando. The producers were George Glass and Walter Seltzer.

While the first draft of the screenplay was primarily about interracial romance, United Artists demanded that aspect be changed, not believing the American public was ready for such a thing. The finished film briefly teases at the idea before abandoning it. Years after the release, Sidney Poitier stated "Cold feet maneuvered to have it twisted around – lining up the colored guy with the colored girl." and that United Artists had "chickened out" and "took the spark out of it."

Poitier said "the script was a one-dimensional concoction."

Filming started November 1960 in Paris.

== Soundtrack ==
Paris Blues

Soundtrack album by Duke Ellington
- Released: 1961
- Recorded: May 2 & 3, 1961
- Genre: Jazz
- Label: United Artists

Duke Ellington chronology
The Great Summit (1961)	Paris Blues (1961)	First Time! The Count Meets the Duke (1961)

Paris Blues is a soundtrack album by American pianist, composer and bandleader Duke Ellington and composer Billy Strayhorn, recorded and released on the United Artists label in 1961 and reissued on Rykodisc in 1996 with additional dialogue from the film and the film trailer on CD-ROM. It features performances by Ellington's Orchestra with Louis Armstrong guesting on two tracks.

At the 34th Academy Awards for films from 1961, Ellington was nominated for the Oscar for Best Music, Scoring of a Musical Picture, but the award was given, rather expectedly, to Saul Chaplin, Johnny Green, Sid Ramin and Irwin Kostal for West Side Story. The award was part of the ten (10) Oscar juggernaut awarded to West Side Story that year.

=== Reception ===
The AllMusic review by Scott Yanow stated: "Although not a classic, Paris Blues (both the film and the soundtrack) is worth owning by jazz collectors". A review in Jazz Times by Stanley Dance, however, was quite critical of the release stating: "both movie and music, in my opinion, were disappointing examples of how too many cooks spoil the broth... for the main NYC sessions, no less than five drummers were brought in, who lamentably failed to swing the big band as the absent Sam Woodyard could have done all by himself. One of the few moments of truth occurs in the finale, "Paris Blues," when Johnny Hodges is briefly heard".

Professional ratings
Review scores
Source	Rating
AllMusic	3/5 stars

=== Track listing ===
All compositions by Duke Ellington except as indicated

1. "Take the 'A' Train" (Billy Strayhorn) – 2:14
2. "You Know Something?" (Spoken dialogue from the film) – 0:24
3. "Battle Royal" – 4:31
4. "Bird Jungle" – 1:59
5. "What's Paris Blues?" (Spoken dialogue from the film) – 0:45
6. "Mood Indigo" (Ellington, Barney Bigard, Irving Mills) – 3:15
7. "Autumnal Suite" – 3:14
8. "Nite" – 3:32
9. "Wild Man Moore" – 1:49
10. "Paris Stairs" – 3:05
11. "I Wasn't Shopping" (Spoken dialogue from the film) – 0:21
12. "Guitar Amour" – 2:02
13. "A Return Reservation" (Spoken dialogue from the film) – 0:33
14. "Paris Blues" – 5:53
- Music cues recorded at Reeves Sound Studios, New York, on May 2 & 3, 1961.

=== Personnel ===
- Duke Ellington – piano
- Louis Armstrong – trumpet (tracks 3 & 9)
- Cat Anderson, Willie Cook, Ed Mullens, Ray Nance, Clark Terry – trumpet
- Louis Blackburn, Lawrence Brown, Murray McEachern, Britt Woodman – trombone
- Juan Tizol – valve trombone
- Arthur Clark, Jimmy Hamilton – clarinet, tenor saxophone
- Johnny Hodges, Oliver Nelson – alto saxophone
- Russell Procope – alto saxophone, clarinet
- Paul Gonsalves – tenor saxophone
- Harry Carney – baritone saxophone, clarinet, bass clarinet
- Harry Smiles – oboe
- Les Spann – guitar, flute
- Jimmy Gourley – guitar
- Aaron Bell – bass
- Sonny Greer, Dave Jackson, Jimmy Johnson, Philly Joe Jones, Max Roach – drums

== Reception ==
On Rotten Tomatoes, the film has an aggregate score of 71% based on 10 positive and 4 negative critic reviews.

Variety called it "a choppy, shallow and discordant picture".

== See also ==
- List of American films of 1961
