= Boulou =

Libyan Jewish sweet bread

- Alternative names: Boulous
- Type: Bread or cake
- Place of origin: Originally Libya, Djerba (Tunisia), today more common in France and Israel
- Region or state: Maghreb, France, Israel, and the Libyan and Tunisian Jewish diasporas
- Created by: Libyan and Tunisian Jewish communities
- Serving temperature: Traditionally for Yom Kippur, Rosh Hashanah, and other Jewish holidays
- Main ingredients: Eggs, fine white flour, water, yeast, sugar, golden raisins, honey, fennel seeds, nigella seeds, sesame seeds, salt, Tunisian Jews add orange zest or juice and chopped almonds

Boulou, also known as boulous, is a Libyan Jewish sweet bread or cake of Maghrebi Jewish origin, similar to mouna, tishpishti, or pound cake, that is traditionally made into loaves or rolls and consumed as part of the meal preceding the Yom Kippur Fast, or as part of the break fast that follows. It is most commonly found today in France, and Israel. Boulou has a sweet taste enriched with sugar, eggs, honey, oil, and golden raisins it often contains seeds such as fennel, sesame, and nigella seeds.

== Overview ==
"Throughout the Hebrew month of the High Holidays known as Tishri, Jews from North Africa have enjoyed this orange-scented boulou bread. Libyan Jews have made it with yeast and Tunisian Jews with baking powder. Little known outside of those communities, Gil Marks does not even mention it in his Encyclopedia of Jewish Foods. Though sadly overlooked, boulou is a citrusy and colorful addition to the fall holiday menu. The venerable Jewish population of Libya, having lived there since the third century, now mostly resides in Israel and North America. We can note that distinguished past through this fragrant bread."

— Rabbi Deborah Prinz

Boulou is traditionally consumed by Maghrebi Jews during the Hebrew month of Tishrei in the leadup to Yom Kippur, and as part of the Yom Kippur breakfast. Boulou has a unique taste and texture that can be described as either a sweet cake-like bread or a bread-like cake, as it is close to both. It is also traditionally served for Rosh Hashanah. Its popularity has spread from Libyan Jewish cuisine, to Tunisian Jewish cuisine, but also to French Jewish and Israeli cuisine (owing to the large population of Libyan Jews in both countries).

== Tunisian Jewish version ==
The Tunisian Jews have a version of boulou due to their proximity to the Libyan Jews. This variant uses baking powder instead of yeast as a leavened and is similar to the Libyan Jewish boulou but with the addition of orange zest and chopped almonds.
