= Moustache (actor) =

French recording artist; actor and jazz drummer

François-Alexandre Galepides (14 February 1929 in Paris – 25 March 1987 in Arpajon), known by the stage name Moustache, was a French jazz drummer and actor.

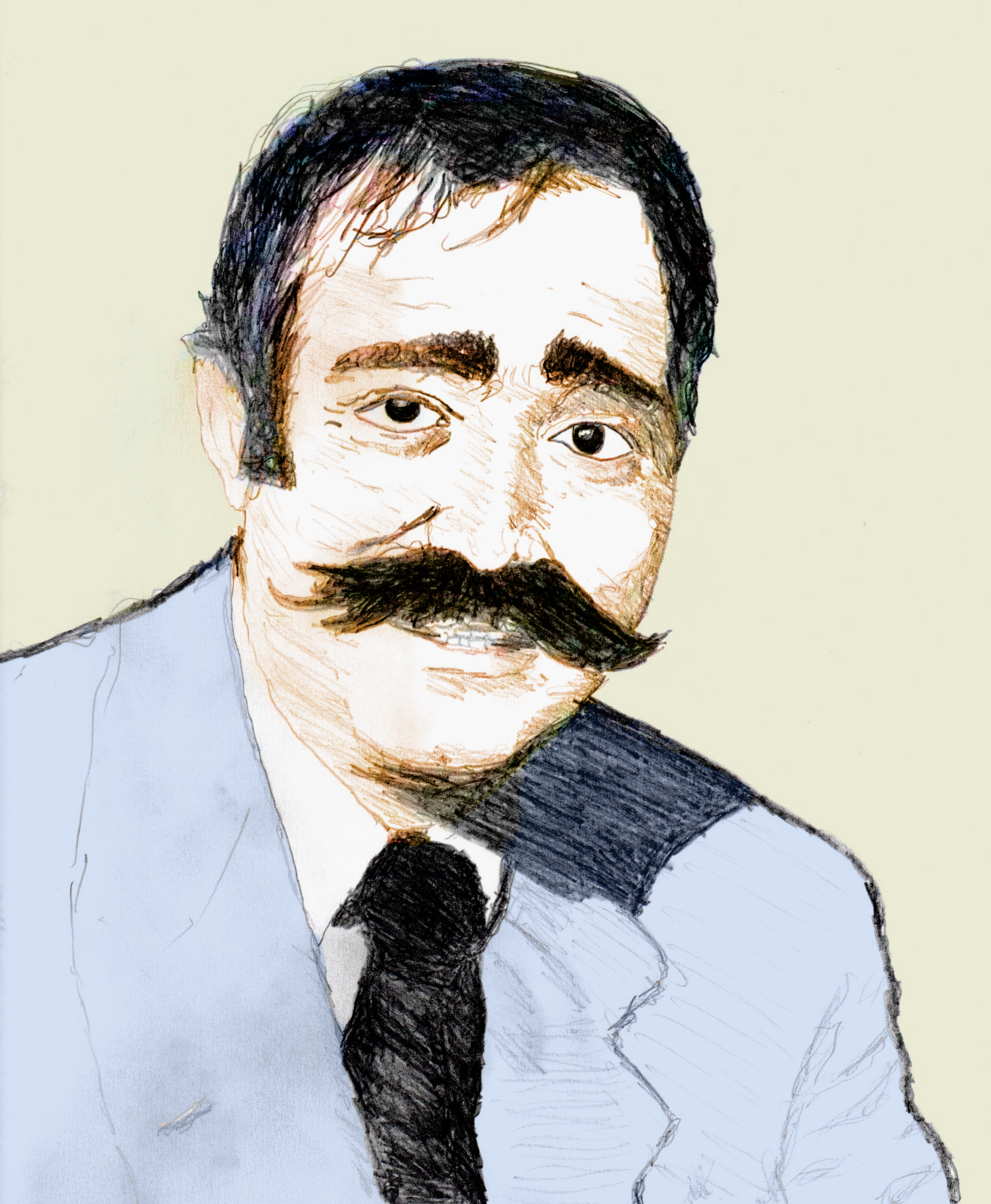
Moustache (pen portrait).

== Life ==
Born to a family of Greek descent, in 1948 he joined Lorient, the orchestra of Claude Luter, as a drummer, playing in clubs of Saint-Germain-des-Prés. He also regularly accompanied Sidney Bechet in France.

From 1950, he led his own bands (Les sept complices and Les gros minets). With the group Moustache et ses Moustachus, from 1956, he recorded, as a drummer and singer, several rock'n'roll novelty songs (e.g. "Le Croque-Skull-Creux", on a text by Boris Vian).

In 1978, he formed the group Les petits Français (including Marcel Zanini, Michel Attenoux and François Guin), which recorded, among other things, jazz pieces by Georges Brassens.

In parallel, Moustache had a career as a restaurateur (the restaurant Moustache, Avenue Duquesne Paris), head of clubs (in the 1960s, The Bilboquet and in 1976, The Jazz Club at the Hotel Méridien Etoile), comic and actor. His acting career included a few major roles such as Neither Seen Nor Recognized (1958) where he co-starred with Louis de Funès, and the 1975 version of Zorro where he portrayed Sergeant García alongside Alain Delon in the title role.

He was a member of the Star Racing Team in motor racing, with other celebrities of the 1980s such actors Jean-Louis Trintignant and Guy Marchand. He died in a car accident.

== Filmography ==
- 1954 : Du rififi chez les hommes
- 1955 : Ce sacré Amédée
- 1956 : The Lebanese Mission as Hassan
- 1956 : Law of the Streets
- 1956 : Paris, Palace Hôtel as Le maître d'hôtel du réveillon
- 1957 : Love in the Afternoon as Butcher (uncredited)
- 1957 : Three Days to Live as Davros
- 1957 : Le Grand Bluff as Moustache
- 1957 : Incognito
- 1957 : Mademoiselle Strip-tease as Moustache
- 1957 : Comme un cheveu sur la soupe as Drummer in the orchestra
- 1958 : Neither Seen Nor Recognized as Ovide Parju, the gamekeeper
- 1959 : Ramuntcho as L'aubergiste
- 1959 : Pêcheur d'Islande
- 1959 : Sergent X as Lopez
- 1959 : La Nuit des traqués
- 1960 : Jack of Spades as Café patron
- 1961 : Vive Henri IV... vive l'amour ! as La Ferrière
- 1961 : Fanny
- 1961 : Paris Blues as Drummer
- 1963 : L'Abominable Homme des douanes as Inspector
- 1963 : In the French Style as Restaurateur
- 1964 : Hardi Pardaillan!
- 1964 : Circus World as Barman
- 1965 : The Art of Love
- 1965 : Lady L as Client
- 1966 : How to Steal a Million as Guard
- 1967 : Two for the Road
- 1968 : Mayerling as Bratfish
- 1968 : A Flea in Her Ear as Fat Man in Room 11
- 1968 : Istanbul Express as Gustav
- 1969 : Avalanche – sous réserve
- 1970 : Le Cri du cormoran le soir au-dessus des jonques
- 1975 : Zorro as Sergeant Garcia
- 1975 : Au-delà de la peur as Georgeaud
- 1976 : Attention les yeux !
- 1977 : Monsieur Papa as Gilles's father
- 1978 : Silver Bears as Señor Bendetti
- 1978 : Le Dernier Amant romantique
- 1979 : Le Maître-nageur as Zopoulos
- 1982 : Deux heures moins le quart avant Jésus-Christ as Emir
- 1984 : Neuville ma belle
