= Guy Lafitte =

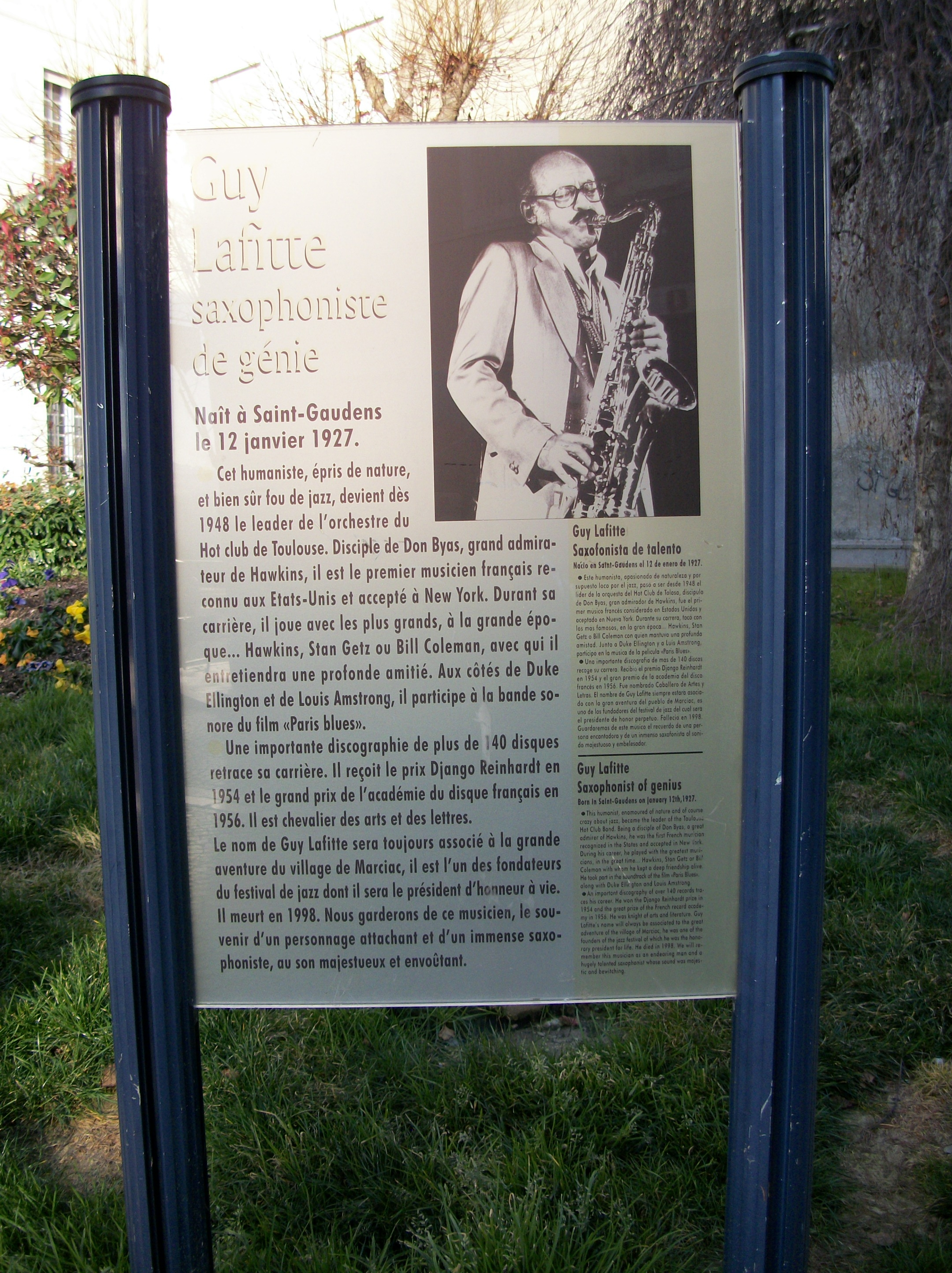
- Monument in Saint-Gaudens

Background information
- Born: 12 January 1927 Saint-Gaudens, Haute-Garonne, France
- Died: 10 June 1998 (aged 71) Tournan, Gers, France
- Genres: Jazz, swing
- Occupation: Musician
- Instrument: Tenor saxophone
- Years active: 1940s–1990s
- Labels: EmArcy, Columbia, Black & Blue

Guy Lafitte (12 January 1927 – 10 June 1998) was a French jazz saxophonist.

== Career ==
Guy Lafitte was born with name Denis Fernand Lafitte on January 12, 1927, in Saint-Gaudens, Haute-Garonne, France. He began his career performing as a clarinetist in Romani music bands in Southwest France. In 1947 he began playing the tenor saxophone.

By 1950 Lafitte had moved to Paris where he was performing in a band backing the blues singer Big Bill Broonzy. In 1951 he performed with the trumpeter Lee Collins and toured and recorded with Mezz Mezzrow. The following year he joined the band of the trumpeter Bill Coleman. He remained in Coleman's band for nearly thirty years, leaving that group in 1980. During that time he also performed with other musicians, including Zutty Singleton (1951–1952), André Persiany (1951-1959), Emmett Berry (1956), Michel De Villers (1956–1957), and Claude Bolling (1956, 1958) to name just a few.

From 1954 through 1958 Lafitte led a small band that had a recurring gig at the Paris nightclub Les Trois Mailletz. In 1956 he made recordings and appeared in concerts with Lionel Hampton. With Georges Arvanitas and Christian Garros he performed as a member of the Paris Jazz Trio. He performed in Duke Ellington's band for the soundtrack of the 1961 film Paris Blues. In 1969 he worked with Roger Guérin at the Club Saint-Germain. From 1978-1998 he led his own band in annual performances at the Jazz in Marciac festival; an event for which he served as vice-president for many years. He also played in a trio with Wild Bill Davis and the drummer Clyde Lucas from 1982 through 1985.

== Discography ==
=== As leader ===
- Blue and Sentimental (Le Club Francais, 1955)
- Les Classiques du Jazz Vol. 2 with Andre Persiany (Columbia, 1958)
- Melodies (Columbia, 1958)
- Sax: 10 Succes (Pathe, 1960)
- Sax and Strings (Columbia, 1963)
- Jambo! (RCA Victor, 1968)
- Blues (Vega, 1969)
- Blues in Summertime (RCA Victor, 1971)
- Sugar and Spice (RCA Victor, 1972)
- Corps et Ame (Black and Blue, 1978)
- Happy! (Black and Blue, 1979)
- Live in France with Arnett Cobb (Black and Blue, 1980)
- Three Men On a Beat with Wild Bill Davis (Black and Blue, 1983)
- Joue Charles Trenet (Black and Blue, 1984)
- Lotus Blossom with Wild Bill Davis (Black and Blue, 2002)
- The Things We Did Last Summer (Black and Blue, 1991)
- Sax Connection (Ida, 1994)
- Crossings with Pierre Boussaguet (EmArcy, 1998)
- Au HCF Paris (Milan, 2002)
- Tenor Abrubt: The Definitive Black & Blue Sessions with Arnett Cobb (Black and Blue, 2003)
- Nice Jazz 1978 (Black and Blue, 2017)

=== As sideman ===
With Bill Coleman

- Jazz at Pleyel (Philips, 1952)
- Saint Louis Baby (Columbia, 1956)
- Them Their Eyes (Columbia, 1956)
- Mainstream at Montreux (Black Lion, 1973)
- Really I Do (Black and Blue, 1982)

With others

- Emmett Berry, Emmett Berry and His Orchestra (Columbia, 1955)
- Claude Bolling, French Jazz (Bally, 1956)
- Milt Buckner, Midnight Slows Vol. 7 (Black and Blue, 1977)
- Buck Clayton & Peanuts Holland, Club Session (Le Club Francais 1955)
- Jack Dieval, Jazz Aux Champs-Elysees (Polydor, 1957)
- Golden Gate Quartet, The Golden Gate Quartet (La Voz De Su Amo, 1962)
- Golden Gate Quartet, Spirituals (Columbia, 1964)
- Lionel Hampton, Recorded in Paris 1956 (Swing 1986)
- Mezz Mezzrow, Swingin' with Mezz (Vogue, 1962)
- Sammy Price & Emmett Berry, 1956 Boogie-Woogie a La Parisienne (Pathe Marconi, 2002)
- Brother John Sellers, Blues and Spirituals (Columbia, 1957)
- Brother John Sellers, Brother John Sellers (Columbia, 1958)
- Lucky Thompson, Nothing but the Soul (EMI, 1993)

== Bibliography ==
- Richard Morton & Brian Cook, The Penguin Guide to Jazz on CD. Sixth Edition. Penguin, London. 2001
