= André Persiany =

French pianist (1927–2004)

André Persiany (November 19, 1927, Paris - January 2, 2004, Paris) was a French jazz pianist.

Persiany's father taught him violin and piano as a child, and by 1945, he had formed his own ensemble. He was a member of the Be Bop Minstrels with Hubert and Raymond Fol in 1947, then played with Michel Attenoux, Eddie Bernard, Bill Coleman, Buck Clayton, Raymond Fonsèque, Lionel Hampton, Guy Lafitte, Mezz Mezzrow, and Tony Proteau.

He relocated to New York City in the mid-1950s, playing at the Birdland club, and worked extensively with Jonah Jones. In 1969, he returned to Paris, and held a residency as the pianist at Le Furstenberg from 1970 to 1988. His associations in the 1970s included Cat Anderson, Milt Buckner, Eddie Chamblee, Arnett Cobb, Al Grey, Budd Johnson, and Charlie Shavers.

Persiany's son Stéphane Persiani became a double-bassist.
