= Pierre Cullaz =

French jazz guitarist and cellist

- Born: 21 July 1935; Paris, France
- Died: 1 January 2014 (aged 78)
- Genres: Jazz
- Occupation(s): Musician, arranger
- Instrument(s): Guitar, cello
- Years active: 1956–1980
- Labels: Barclay
- Formerly of: Guitars Unlimited

Pierre Cullaz (21 July 1935 – 1 January 2014) was a French jazz guitarist and cellist.

Pierre Cullaz was the son of Maurice Cullaz, a jazz writer, and the older brother of Alby Cullaz. After he learned piano and cello in 1949, he moved to guitar as his main instrument.

In 1955, he started his professional career with Dexter Gordon, Johnny Griffin, and Hal Singer. Two years later he worked with Michel Hausser, then Sarah Vaughan, Claude Bolling and Stéphane Grappelli. After military service, he became a studio musician. He worked with Martial Solal and Eddy Louiss and beginning in 1965 was a member of the band Guitars Unlimited. He formed Guitars Unlimited with Victor Apicella, Raymond Gimenez, Francis Lemaguer, and Tony Rallo. The band recorded for Barclay. Other collaborators included Elvin Jones, Andre Hodeir, Ivan Jullien, Guy Lafitte. Cullaz also taught guitar and wrote a method book.

He accompanied singer Claude Nougaro and was an arranger for Michel Legrand. Besides being a musician, he taught at the CIM in Paris and wrote the textbook Methode de Guitare.

== Sources ==
- Cook, Richard and Morton, Brian. The Penguin Guide to Jazz Recordings, 8th Edition, London, Penguin, 2006 ISBN 0-14-102327-9
- Feather, Leonard and Gitler, Ira. The Biographical Encyclopedia of Jazz. Oxford/New York, 1999 ISBN 978-0-19-532000-8
