= Aaron Bridgers =

American jazz pianist (1918–2003)

- Born: January 10, 1918; Winston-Salem, North Carolina
- Died: November 3, 2003 (aged 85); Paris France
- Occupation: Pianist

Aaron Bridgers (January 10, 1918 – November 3, 2003) was an American jazz pianist and composer.

Bridgers grew up in Winston-Salem, North Carolina where he learned to play piano and where he met Duke Ellington. Bridgers had moved to New York City, working side jobs and continuing to study piano when Ellington introduced him to Billy Strayhorn. Soon after Bridgers and Strayhorn moved in together becoming lovers from 1939 until Bridgers's move to France in 1947.

Bridgers is featured in the Paul Newman film Paris Blues (1961).
