= Club Saint-Germain =

Jazz club in Paris, France

Coordinates: 48.8546°N 2.3331°E

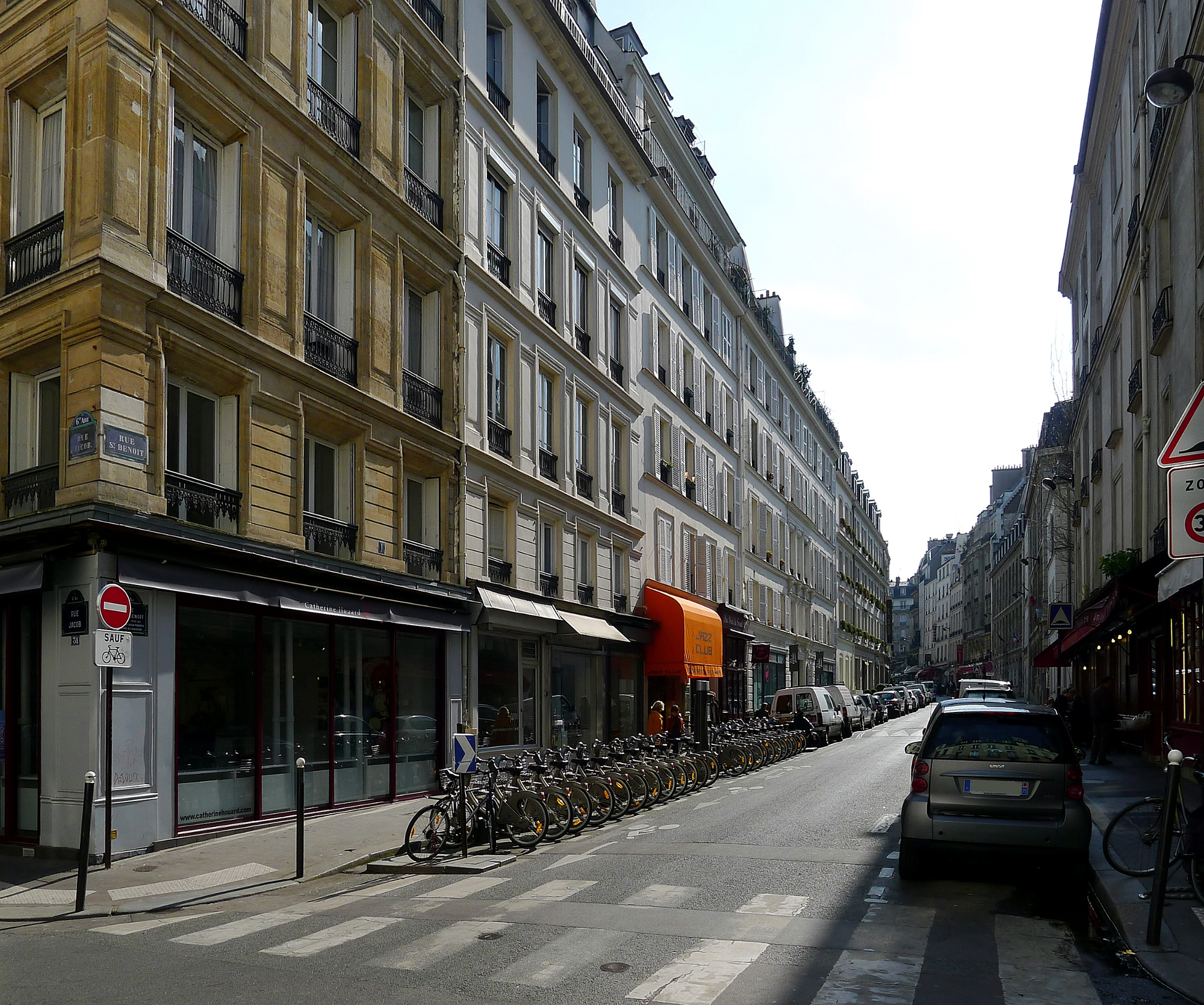
- Outside view of Club Saint-Germain
- Interactive map of Club Saint-Germain
- Location: Paris, France
- Owner: Freddie Chauvelot; Paul Lavigne; Marc Doelnitz; Boris Vian
- Type: Jazz club, supper club

Construction
- Opened: 1947

The Club Saint-Germain was a jazz club located at 13 rue Saint-Benoît in the 6e arrondissement de Paris.

== History ==
The club was opened in 1947 by Freddie Chauvelot, Christian Casadesus, Paul Lavigne, Marc Doelnitz, and Boris Vian. Throughout the 1940s, 1950s, and 1960s, it booked leading figures in the French jazz scene such as Barney Wilen, René Urtreger, Django Reinhardt, Stéphane Grappelli, Lalo Schifrin, and Pierre Michelot. Many visiting Americans played in the club, including Miles Davis, Art Blakey, and Kenny Dorham, along with Bud Powell and Kenny Clarke, who settled in Paris for longer periods. From 1959, the main European rival was the Jazzhus Montmartre in Copenhagen.

The building of the defunct Club Saint-Germain used to be home to the supper club Bilboquet.

== Live recordings ==
- Barney Wilen – Barney (RCA)
- Art Blakey – Art Blakey et les Jazz-Messengers au Club St. Germain, vol. 1-2 (RCA)
- Bobby Jaspar – Modern Jazz au Club Saint Germain (Barclay)

== See also ==
- List of supper clubs
