= Benoit Dunoyer de Segonzac =

French virtuoso double bass player

Benoit Dunoyer de Segonzac (born 1962) is a virtuoso double bass player who performed with Jacques Loussier and Andre Arpino playing renditions by Johann Sebastian Bach / Eric Satie.

A cousin of the painter André Dunoyer de Segonzac, he was born in Strasbourg, where he began to study music at the age of five at the Strasbourg Conservatoire. He completed his professional training on the contrabass at the age of twenty under Vincent Pasquier of the Orchestre de Paris and Jean Marc Rollez, soloist with the Paris Opera.

Dunoyer de Segonzac and the drummer, Andre Arpino, have tackled some of today’s most popular Baroque classics. Their goal is to play the piece in a manner that updates the sound while remaining true to the spirit of each piece.

The repetitive structure of the Pachelbel allows Loussier and his virtuosic bass player, de Segonzac, to trade the melody and bass lines in a delicious interplay of sounds and ideas. In the Albinoni, similarly constructed with a repetitive harmonic framework, Arpino provides a lively beat in the central section that tempts Loussier to some sassy improvisation.
