= Peanuts Holland =

American jazz musician

- Birth name: Herbert Lee Holland
- Born: February 9, 1910; Norfolk, Virginia, U.S.
- Died: February 7, 1979 (aged 68); Stockholm, Sweden
- Genres: Jazz, swing jazz
- Instruments: Trumpet

Herbert Lee "Peanuts" Holland (February 9, 1910 – February 7, 1979) was an American jazz trumpeter best known for his contributions in swing jazz.

== Early life ==
Born in Norfolk, Virginia, Holland learned to play trumpet at the Jenkins Orphanage.

== Career ==
Holland played and recorded with Alphonse Trent's band between 1928 and 1933, and played with Al Sears (1932), the Jeter-Pillars Orchestra, Willie Bryant, Jimmie Lunceford, and Lil Armstrong's band (1935–36). He also occasionally led his own band.

In 1939, Holland moved to New York City, playing in big bands led by Coleman Hawkins and Fletcher Henderson. From 1941 to 1946, he played with Charlie Barnet. He and Don Redman toured Europe in 1946, and during this tour Holland elected to remain there, living in Paris, France, and then Sweden. He recorded there until 1960, releasing some 46 records for European labels.

== Personal life ==
Holland was the younger brother of classical tenor singer Charles Holland. Holland died in Stockholm.

== Discography ==
=== As sideman (alphabetical order) ===
- Charlie Barnet, Hop on the Skyliner (Decca, 1955)
- Charlie Barnet, On the Air (Sandy Hook, 1983)
- Charlie Barnet, Drop Me Off in Harlem (GRP, 1992)
- Don Byas, Don Byas in Paris (Prestige, 1968)
- Buck Clayton, Club Session (Le Club Francaise, 1955)
- Guy Lafitte, Blue and Sentimental (Le Club Francaise, 1955)
- Mezz Mezzrow, A La Schola Cantorum (Ducretet-Thomson, 1956)
- Bud Powell, Parisian Thoroughfares (Pablo, 2003)
- Don Redman, For Europeans Only (SteepleChase, 1983)
- Stuff Smith, Hot Jazz Violin 1930–1940 (Jazz Legends, 2005)
- Kay Starr, For Real (Proper, 2003)
