= Michel Attenoux =

Michel Attenoux (June 14, 1930 in Paris – April 24, 1988 in Laval) was a French jazz saxophonist.

Attenoux played piano in his youth, later learning soprano saxophone and playing locally. He founded his ensemble in 1951, which played with Peanuts Holland in 1952 and 1953 was offered the position of house band at a Parisian club called Metro Jazz. There he played with Sidney Bechet, Jimmy Archey, and others. Starting in 1955, he added alto saxophone to his repertory. He played with visiting American musicians in Paris over the next several decades and at the Newport Jazz Festival in 1975. In the 1970s he worked with Geo Daly, Marc Laferrière, Al Grey, Eddie Lockjaw Davis, and the Lionel Hampton All-Stars. In 1978 he formed Les Petits Français with Moustache, Marcel Zanini, and François Guin, which recorded jazz versions of the songs of Georges Brassens.

== Discography ==
With Al Grey

- Grey's Mood (Black and Blue, 1973-75 [1979])
