= Bernard Peiffer =

French jazz pianist, composer, and teacher

Bernard Peiffer (pie-fer) (23 October 1922 – 7 September 1976) was a French jazz pianist, composer, and teacher. His nickname was "Le Most", for his piano skills.

== Life ==
Born in Épinal, France, Peiffer was raised in a musical family, with his father and uncle playing the violin and the organ, respectively. Beginning to learn piano at age nine, he studied under Pierre Maire, a student of Nadia Boulanger, and quickly demonstrated his abilities by repeating long sections of classical works by ear. After winning the 1st Prize in Piano at the Paris Conservatory, Peiffer began his professional career at the age of twenty, playing with André Ekyan and Django Reinhardt.

During World War II, he joined the French resistance after he witnessed the execution of a friend by the Gestapo in the streets of Paris. Soon afterwards he was captured, and was incarcerated for over a year.

In the early 1950s, he began a successful career, playing with Django Reinhardt, leading his own quintet, composing film soundtracks, and achieving notice in the clubs of Paris, Monte Carlo and Nice, and eventually becoming nationally known.

He moved to Philadelphia in 1954 with his wife Corine and daughter Rebecca. The subsequent loss of his third daughter (his first was from a previous marriage with singer Monique Dozo) profoundly affected him, resulting in "Poem for a Lonely Child". The year 1962 saw the birth of his first son (and final child), Stephen.

During his first years in America, he achieved considerable success, performing at Carnegie Hall, Birdland, and the Newport Jazz Festival. He recorded for the EmArcy, Decca and Laurie labels. During this time, critic Leonard Feather compared his playing with that of Art Tatum. Peiffer released his last commercial album in 1965 and, after having kidney surgery a few years later, restricted himself to performing and teaching, mainly in Philadelphia. His students included Uri Caine, Sumi Tonooka, Tom Lawton, and Don Glanden.

His last major appearance was at the 1974 New York/Newport Festival at Carnegie Hall. He died on 7 September 1976, aged 53. A posthumous release, entitled Formidable...!, that spans twenty years of his career, was released in 2005, produced by his student Don Glanden and son Stephen.

== Selected discography ==
- Le Most (1954)
- Bernie's Tunes (1956)
- Piano A La Mood (1958)
- Modern Jazz For People Who Like Original Music (1960)
- The Pied Peiffer Of The Piano (1960)
- Bernard Peiffer Plays Cole Porter's Can-Can (1960)
- Bernard Peiffer & His Jazz Piano Plays Prelude, Fugue And Trio On "Lullaby Of Birdland (1965)
- Formidable (2005)
