= Don Byas =

American jazz saxophonist (1913–1972)

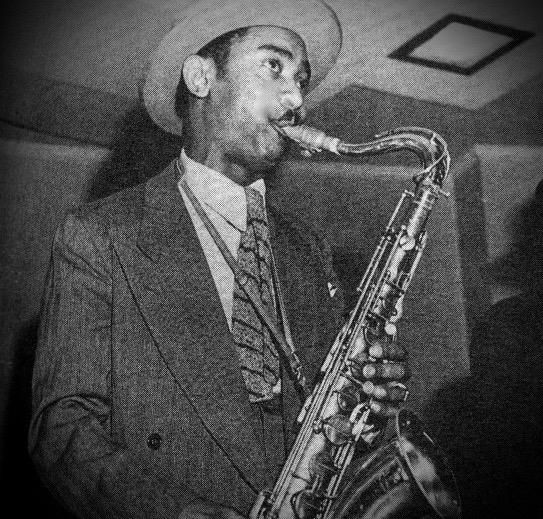

Background information
- Born: Carlos Wesley Byas; October 21, 1912; Muskogee, Oklahoma, U.S.
- Died: August 24, 1972 (aged 59) Amsterdam, Netherlands
- Genres: Swing, bebop
- Instrument: Tenor saxophone

Carlos Wesley "Don" Byas (October 21, 1912 – August 24, 1972) was an American jazz tenor saxophonist, associated with swing and bebop. He played with Count Basie, Duke Ellington, Art Blakey, and Dizzy Gillespie, among others, and also led his own band. He lived in Europe for the last 26 years of his life.

== Biography ==
=== Oklahoma and Los Angeles ===
Byas was born in Muskogee, Oklahoma, United States. Both of Byas' parents were musicians. His mother played the piano, and his father, the clarinet. Byas began his musical education in the European classical tradition, learning to play violin, clarinet and alto saxophone, which he played until the end of the 1920s.

Benny Carter, who played many instruments, was his idol at this time. Byas started to perform in local orchestras at the age of 17, with Bennie Moten, Terrence Holder and Walter Page. He founded and led his own college band, Don Carlos and His Collegiate Ramblers, during 1931–1932, at Langston College, Oklahoma.

Byas switched to the tenor saxophone after he moved to the West Coast, and played with several Los Angeles bands. In 1934, he took part in a West coast tour of Bert Johnson's Sharps and Flats. He worked in Lionel Hampton's band at the Paradise Club in 1935, along with the reed player and arranger Eddie Barefield and trombonist Tyree Glenn. He also played with Buck Clayton, Lorenzo Flennoy and Charlie Echols.

=== New York City ===
In 1937, Byas moved to New York to work with the Eddie Mallory band, accompanying Mallory's wife, the singer Ethel Waters, on tour, and at the Cotton Club. He had a brief stint with arranger Don Redman's band in 1938 and later from 1939 to 1940. He recorded his first solo record in May 1939: "Is This to Be My Souvenir?" with Timme Rosenkrantz and his Barrelhouse Barons for Victor. He played with the bands of such leaders as Lucky Millinder, Andy Kirk, Edgar Hayes and Benny Carter. He spent about a year in Kirk's band, recording with him between March 1939 and January 1940, including a short solo on "You Set Me on Fire".

In September 1940, he had an eight bar solo on "Practice Makes Perfect", recorded by Billie Holiday. He participated in sessions with the pianist Pete Johnson, trumpeter Hot Lips Page, and singer Big Joe Turner. In 1941, at Minton's Playhouse he played with Charlie Christian, Thelonious Monk and Kenny Clarke in after hours sessions.

In early 1941, after a short stay with Paul Bascomb, he had his big break when Count Basie chose him to succeed the post of Lester Young in his big band. Byas recorded "Harvard Blues" with the Basie orchestra on November 17, 1941, on Jimmy Rushing's vocal version of George Frazier's tune. He was part of a small group session on July 24, 1942, with Buck Clayton, Count Basie, and his rhythm section (Freddie Green, Walter Page, Jo Jones) recording "Royal Garden Blues" and "Sugar Blues".

In August 1942, the band travelled to Hollywood record for the film Reveille with Beverly, to be followed by another film, Stage Door Canteen, in February 1943. He stayed with Basie until November 1943.

He played in small bands in New York clubs, including the Coleman Hawkins orchestra (1944), and he associated with beboppers such as Dizzy Gillespie, Charlie Parker, George Wallington, Oscar Pettiford and Max Roach at the Onyx Club from early 1944. He recorded with the latter under Hawkins on what is said to be the first bebop issue, "Woody 'n You", on February 16 and 22, 1944. In May 1944, he shared tenor duties with Hawkins in the latter's Sax Ensemble, as well as leading his own band on performances at the Three Deuces club. After recording for small labels (Savoy, Jamboree, National, Disc, Arista, Super, American, Hub, Gotham) in this period, Byas had a major hit with "Laura" by David Raksin, the title tune of Otto Preminger's movie of the same name (1944).

On January 4, 1945, Byas recorded with Clyde Hart, singer Rubberlegs Williams, Gillespie, Parker, Trummy Young, and on January 9, 1945, Gillespie, Byas and Young recorded "Be Bop", "Salt Peanuts", and "Good Bait" for Manor. On June 9, Byas and Slam Stewart played a live duet at The Town Hall. Byas led a small group for several sessions for Savoy during 1945–46. He was second-place winner in tenor sax of the Esquire All-American Awards in January 1946, and in February, he recorded again with Gillespie on "52nd Street Theme" and "Night in Tunisia".

Despite his bebop associations, Byas remained deeply rooted in the sounds of swing. He emulated Coleman Hawkins, but Byas cited Art Tatum as his greater influence: "I haven't got any style! I just blow like Art".

=== Paris ===
In September 1946, Byas began his exile in Europe to tour with Don Redman's big band in Denmark, Belgium, Switzerland, and Germany. They were the first civilian jazz big band to tour the continent after the war. After playing in Belgium and Spain, he finally settled in Paris.

While still in Geneva, Byas recorded "Laura" and "How High the Moon". In December 1946, he recorded for the first time in France, with Redman, Tyree Glenn and Peanuts Holland. He recorded for the Swing and Blue Star labels in 1947, working with Eddie Barclay. In 1947-48, he lived in Barcelona, due to the lower cost of living and the thriving atmosphere. Pianist Tete Montoliu sneaked into the Copacabana Club in Barcelona to hear Byas.

Byas played with Bill Coleman in early 1949; touring that autumn with Buck Clayton. From 1948 onward, Byas became a familiar figure not only around the Saint-Germain-des-Prés in Paris, but also on the Riviera, where he could be seen in Saint-Tropez sporting a mask, tenor sax, flippers and an underwater spear-gun. Byas collaborated again with Andy Kirk and recorded together on Vogue in 1953. Byas also recorded with Mary Lou Williams in 1953 and Beryl Booker in 1954.

=== Netherlands ===
Byas moved to the Netherlands in the early 1950s; in 1955, he married Johanna "Jopie" Eksteen.

He worked extensively in Europe, often with touring American musicians. He also recorded with fado singer Amália Rodrigues during his time in Europe. Byas did not visit the U.S. until 1970, appearing at the Newport Jazz Festival. He died in Amsterdam in 1972 from lung cancer at the age of 59.

Byas was inducted into the Oklahoma Jazz Hall of Fame in 1997.

Byas' last Dolnet tenor saxophone (purchased from his widow) is on display at Rutgers University's Institute of Jazz Studies. His first custom Dolnet Bel Air tenor sax is owned and played by James Carter.

== Discography ==
=== As leader ===
- 1941 - Midnight at Minton's (Onyx, 1973) reissued as Midnight At Minton's (High Note, 1999)
- 1945 - Don Byas at Town Hall (Commodore Records, ?)
- 1944-45 - The Chronological Don Byas (Classics #882, ?)
- 1945-01 - The Chronological Don Byas (Classics #910, ?)
- 1945-02 - The Chronological Don Byas (Classics #959, ?)
- 1946 - The Chronological Don Byas (Classics #1009, ?)
- 1944-46 - Classic Don Byas Sessions 1944-1946 (10 CDs) (Mosaic Records, 2023) As leader, co-leader or featured session man
- 1946-54 - The Complete 1946-1954 Paris Recordings (3 CD) (Solid Jazz Recordings, ?) originally released on the Swing, Vogue and Blue Star labels
- 1954 - Don Carlos Meets Mary Lou (Vogue, 1954) See previous boxset
- 1961 - A Tribute to Cannonball (Columbia, 1979), with Bud Powell
- 1962 - Don Byas at Nalen (Riverside, 2012)
- 1963 - April in Paris! Don Byas with Strings (Battle, 1963)
- 1963 - All The Things You Are (Jazz life, 1988)
- 1963 - Anthropology (Black Lion, 1972)
- 1964 - Don Byas' 30th Anniversary Album (Fontana, 1964) Reissued by Polidor in 1968 as Live At The Montmartre Copenhagen
- 1965 - Autumn Leaves (Jazz House, 1998)
- 1967 - Don Byas featuring Sir Charles Thompson (Storyville, 2000)

=== As sideman ===
- Beryl Booker, Beryl Booker Trio with Don Byas in Paris (Discovery, 1954)
- Bill Coleman, Lausanne 1949 (TCB 2010)
- Coleman Hawkins, 52nd Street: Vol. 2 (Onyx, 1974)
- Amalia Rodrigues, Encontro (Columbia, 1972)
- Ben Webster, Ben Webster Meets Don Byas (SABA, 1968)
- Mary Lou Williams, Messin' 'Round in Montmartre (Storyville, 1956)
