= Bill Coleman (trumpeter) =

American jazz trumpeter (1904–1981)

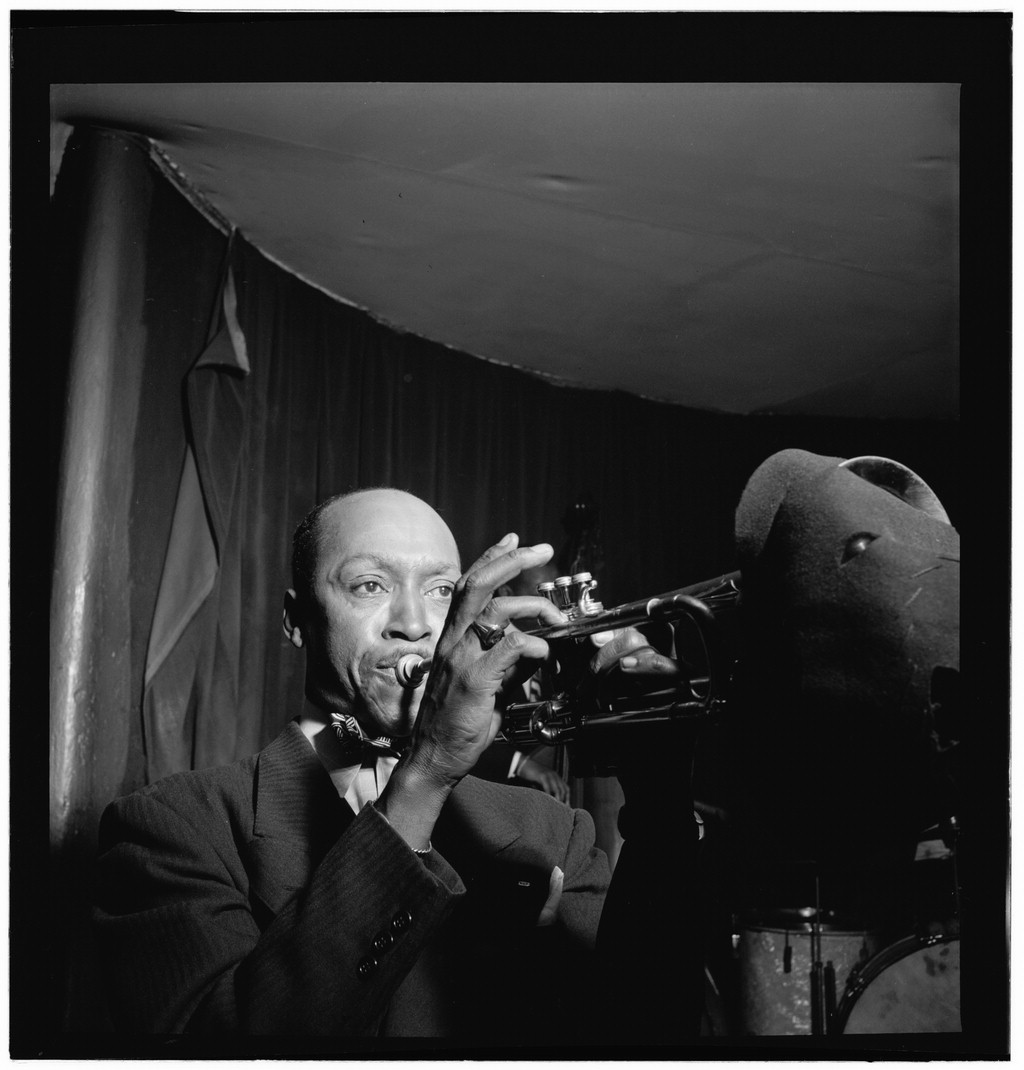
- Bill Coleman at Cafe Society, between 1946 and 1948. Photo: William P. Gottlieb.

Background information
- Born: William Johnson Coleman; August 4, 1904; Paris, Kentucky, United States
- Died: August 24, 1981 (aged 77) Toulouse, France
- Genres: Jazz
- Occupation: Musician
- Instrument: Trumpet
- Years active: 1927–1981
- Formerly of: Ben Webster, Guy Lafitte

William Johnson Coleman (August 4, 1904 in Paris, Kentucky, United States – August 24, 1981 in Toulouse, France) was an American jazz trumpeter.

== Early life ==
In 1909, Coleman's family moved from Kentucky to Cincinnati. His first musical explorations were on clarinet and C melody saxophone, but he eventually settled on trumpet. As a young man he worked as a messenger for the Western Union telegraph company. He studied with Cincinnati trumpeter Theodore Carpenter, and played in an amateur band led by trombonist J.C. Higginbotham.

== Career ==
Coleman began professional work in Cincinnati with bands led by Clarence Paige and Wesley Helvey (both bands his teacher Carpenter worked in) then with Lloyd and Cecil Scott. In December 1927, he traveled with the Scott brothers to New York City, and continued to work with them until the late summer of 1929, when he joined the orchestra of pianist Luis Russell. His first recording session was with Russell on September 6, 1929, and he soloed on the tune "Feelin' the Spirit". By December 1929, he had left Russell (partly due to the majority of the solo work going to section mate Henry "Red" Allen), but re-joined the band on two more occasions during 1931–32.

He rejoined the Scott brothers (then known as Cecil Scott's Bright Boys) in late 1929, participating in a Victor recording session, and continued to work with them through the early part of 1930. He worked with various New York based bands until rejoining Luis Russell in 1931.

His first trip to Europe was with the band of Lucky Millinder from June until October 1933, after which he returned to New York to work with bandleaders Benny Carter and Teddy Hill, whom he recorded with in early 1935. While with the Hill band he participated in a freelance recording session with pianist Fats Waller, waxing a number of sides.

Coleman returned to Cincinnati briefly in the summer of 1935, then headed to Europe, playing a residency in Paris with entertainer/vocalist Freddy Taylor (whom he had worked with in the Lucky Millinder band). While in Paris, he recorded with guitarist Django Reinhardt and made several freelance sessions under his own name. In late 1936, he traveled to Bombay, India, playing with Leon Abbey's Orchestra, then back to Paris in April 1937, joining the band led by American-born saxophonist William T. Lewis (the band known as Willie Lewis and his Entertainers).

After a sojourn to Cairo, Egypt, Coleman returned to the U.S. in March 1940, and worked throughout the 1940s with a variety of top groups including bands led by Benny Carter (1940), Teddy Wilson (1940–41), Andy Kirk (1941–42), Ellis Larkins (1943), Mary Lou Williams (1944), John Kirby (1945), Sy Oliver (1946–47), and Billy Kyle (1947–48). During this same time, Coleman participated in many recording sessions with top jazz stars such as Lester Young, Billie Holiday and Coleman Hawkins.

He returned to France in 1948 and spent the rest of his life there, in part due to wishing to avoid racial segregation. Like many American musicians, he felt he received the recognition he deserved from European audiences, and during the decades he lived in France he traveled and performed in clubs and concert venues all over Europe. In 1978, he performed at the first Jazz in Marciac festival (along with tenor saxophonist Guy Lafitte), later becoming an honorary president of the festival organization.

In 1974, he received the Ordre National du Mérite. His autobiography, called Trumpet Story and translated into French by his wife, Lily, was published in 1981 (Cana éditions). The English version was published in 1989 by Palgrave-Macmillan, UK. Another version, including many original photographs, was published by Mémoires d'Oc éditions in 2004, and entitled De Paris (Kentucky) à Paris (France), ma trompette sous le bras (From Paris (Kentucky) to Paris (France), with my trumpet under my arm).

== Playing style ==
From his first solo on record with the Luis Russell Orchestra, Coleman's playing exhibited a lighter sound more akin to Jabbo Smith than Louis Armstrong, yet his phrasing is more in the Armstrong vein than that of Smith. In many respects his playing was stylistically related to the playing by other swing era trumpeters such as Roy Eldridge and Buck Clayton.

== Discography ==
- From Boogie to Funk (Brunswick, 1960)
- Jazz Pour Dieu (Unidisc, 1966)
- Sings and Plays 12 Negro Spirituals (Concert Hall, 1968)
- Together at Last (Pathe, 1969)
- Three Generation Jam (77 Records, 1969)
- Bill and the Boys (Concert Hall, 1972)
- Swingin' in London (Black Lion, 1972)
- Bill Coleman in Milan with Lino Patruno and Friends (Durium, 1973)
- Mainstream at Montreux (Black Lion, 1973)
- Cave's Blues (Jazzmosphere 1979)
- Really I Do (Black & Blue, 1982)
- Swinging in Switzerland (Black and Blue, 1983)
- Blowing for the Cats (DRG, 1980)
- In Paris (Affinity 1991)
- The Complete Philips Recordings (Gitanes/Universal, 2006)
