= Bruce Cockburn discography =

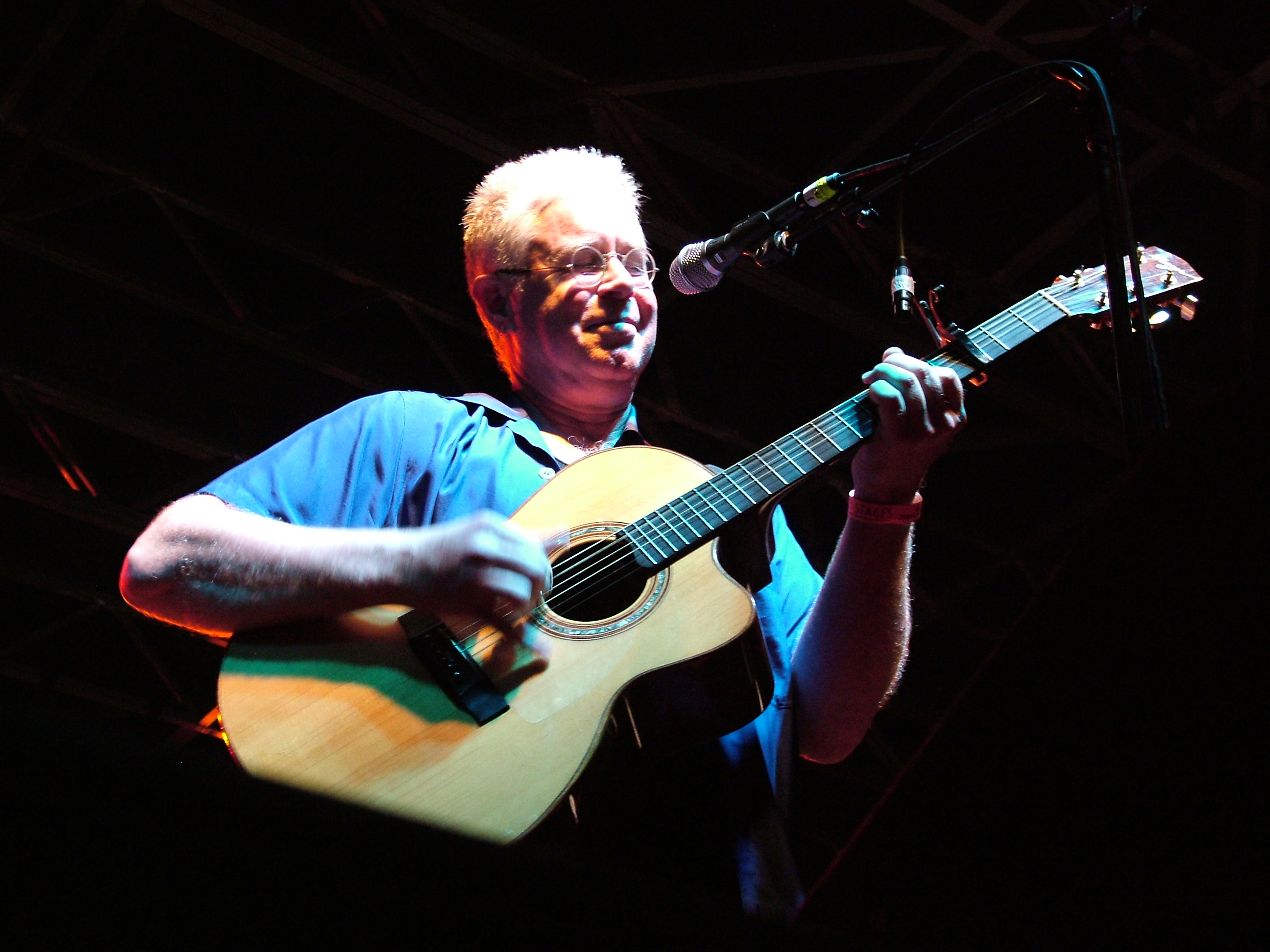
Cockburn performing in 2007

The discography for Canadian rock singer Bruce Cockburn consists of 26 studio albums, 5 live albums, 9 compilation albums, and over 30 singles.

Cockburn was signed to True North Records in 1970, becoming the first artist signed to the label. That same year, he released his self-titled album, which peaked at No. 65 on the RPM Canadian album chart.

Following "Up the Hillside", which reached the Canadian adult contemporary chart, Cockburn experienced a seven-year dry spell on the singles charts until "Wondering Where the Lions Are", his first song to appear on the national singles charts in the United States. It became his highest charting single on the US Billboard Hot 100 and his second song to reach the RPM Top Singles chart after "One Day I Walk", which had entered that listing nearly eight years prior. Cockburn sustained a series of charting singles throughout the 1980s and 1990s in Canada, with several of them reaching the top 50. His highest charting song in his home country was "If a Tree Falls", which peaked at No. 8 in 1989.

Cockburn's albums were released under several labels in the United States, with his first album being carried by Epic Records in 1971. He then switched to Island Records for the US release of In the Falling Dark which was sustained through Further Adventures Of. Millennium Records agreed to handle the release of his records in the United States beginning with Dancing in the Dragon's Jaws. Cockburn switched over to Gold Mountain Records for The Trouble with Normal, which was not officially released in the US until 1985. Nothing but a Burning Light in 1991, Columbia Records began handling the releases of Cockburn's albums outside of Canada.

Several of Cockburn's albums have received certifications from Music Canada, with his Christmas album being certified 6x platinum.

== Albums ==
=== Studio albums ===
Title	Peak chart positions				Certifications
Title	CAN	GER	US Billboard 200	US Billboard Independent Albums	Certifications
Bruce Cockburn (1970)	65	–	–	–	MC: Gold
High Winds, White Sky (1971)	26	–	–	–	MC: Gold
Sunwheel Dance (1972)	19	–	–	–	MC: Gold
Night Vision (1973)	14	–	–	–	MC: Gold
Salt, Sun and Time (1974)	24	–	–	–	
Joy Will Find a Way (1975)	34	–	–	–	MC: Gold
In the Falling Dark (1977)	44	–	–	–	MC: Gold
Further Adventures Of (1978)	65	–	–	–	
Dancing in the Dragon's Jaws (1979)	22	–	45	–	MC: Platinum
Humans (1980)	32	–	81	–	MC: Gold
Inner City Front (1981)	20	–	–	–	MC: Gold
The Trouble with Normal (1983)	14	–	–	–	MC: Gold
Stealing Fire (1984)	12	–	74	–	MC: Platinum
World of Wonders (1986)	7	48	143	–	MC: Gold
Big Circumstance (1989)	15	–	182	–	MC: Gold
Nothing but a Burning Light (1991)	30	–	–	–	MC: Gold
Christmas (1993)	–	–	–	–	MC: 6× Platinum
Dart to the Heart (1994)	27	–	176	–	
The Charity of Night (1997)	70	–	178	–	MC: Gold
Breakfast in New Orleans, Dinner in Timbuktu (1999)	–	–	–	39	
You've Never Seen Everything (2003)	–	–	–	–	
Life Short Call Now (2006)	–	–	–	–	
Small Source of Comfort (2011)	–	–	–	–	
Bone On Bone (2017)	34	–	–	28	
Crowing Ignites (2019)	–	–	–	36	
O Sun O Moon (2023)	–	–	–^{[1]}	–	
The Blood of Others (2026)	–	–	–	–	

=== Live albums ===
Title	Year	Peak chart positions
Title	Year	Can
Circles in the Stream	1977; Deluxe edition reissued 2005	91
Bruce Cockburn Live	1990; Deluxe edition reissued with additional track 2002	47
You Pay Your Money and You Take Your Chance	1997	–
Bruce Cockburn—Live on World Cafe	2002 bonus disc from Borders Books and Music	–
Slice O Life—Solo Live	2009	–

=== Compilations ===
Title	Year	Can	US
Resume	1981; US only	–	174
Mummy Dust	1981 originally released in Canada only	43	–
Rumours of Glory	1985; Germany only	–	–
Waiting for a Miracle: Singles 1970–1987	1987; Canadian version is two discs, US version is one	18	–
If a Tree Falls	1990; Australia only	–	–
Anything Anytime Anywhere: Singles 1979–2002	2002	–	–
Speechless	2005 instrumental compilation; includes 3 new recordings	–	–
Greatest Hits 1970-2020	2021 no new material was released on this album	–	–
Rarities	2022; Collection of unreleased tracks and remastered tracks	–	–

=== Videos ===
Title	Release date	Media	Publisher
Bruce Cockburn Live - Rumours of Glory	1984	VHS, Beta	Cineplex Corp.
Bruce Cockburn Full House 1986 Hamburg TV show	2005	DVD	
Bruce Cockburn Pacing the Cage: The Feature Documentary	2013	DVD	True North Records

=== Other releases ===
- "Ribbon of Darkness", a track on Beautiful: A Tribute to Gordon Lightfoot
- "Strong Hand of Love", a track on the Mark Heard tribute albums Strong Hand of Love (1994) and Orphans of God (1996)
- "Lord of the Starfields" (with Rob Wasserman), "Lovers in a Dangerous Time" (with Rob Wasserman), and "Cry of a Tiny Babe" (with Lou Reed, Rosanne Cash, and Rob Wasserman), all on The Best of the Columbia Records Radio Hour, Volume 1 (1995)
- "Last Night of the World" on the WXPN compilation album, Live at the World Café – Volume 9 (1999)
- "If I Had a Rocket Launcher", a track on the acoustic sessions album "2 Meter Sessies Volume 1" (1991).
- "Wise Users", a track on the 1996 album, Honor: A Benefit for the Honor The Earth Campaign

== Singles ==
Year	Single	Peak chart positions							Album
Year	Single	CAN	CAN AC	AUS	GER	US Hot 100	US Mainstream Rock	US Modern Rock	Album
1970	"Going to the Country"	—	4 ^{[2]}	—	—	—	—	—	Bruce Cockburn
1970	"Musical Friends"	—	26	—	—	—	—	—	Bruce Cockburn
1971	"One Day I Walk"	64	—	—	—	—	—	—	High Winds, White Sky
1972	"It's Going Down Slow"	—	12	—	—	—	—	—	Sunwheel Dance
1972	"Up on the Hillside"	—	21	—	—	—	—	—	Sunwheel Dance
1973	"Mama Just Wants to Barrelhouse All Night Long"	—	—	—	—	—	—	—	Night Vision
1975	"Burn"	—	—	—	—	—	—	—	Joy Will Find a Way
1977	"I'm Gonna Fly Someday"	—	—	—	—	—	—	—	In the Falling Dark
1978	"Laughter"	—	—	—	—	—	—	—	Further Adventures Of
1979	"Wondering Where the Lions Are"^{[3]}	39	6	92	—	21	—	—	Dancing in the Dragon's Jaws
1980	"Tokyo"	44	36	—	—	—	—	—	Humans
1981	"Rumours of Glory"	—	36	—	—	104	—	—	Humans
1981	"Fascist Architecture (I'm Okay)"	—	1 ^{[4]}	—	—	—	—	—	Humans
1981	"The Coldest Night of the Year"	42	—	—	—	—	—	—	Mummy Dust
1981	"Radio Shoes"	—	—	—	—	—	—	—	Inner City Front
1982	"You Pay Your Money and You Take Your Chance"	—	19	—	—	—	—	—	Inner City Front
1983	"The Trouble With Normal"	—	—	—	—	—	—	—	The Trouble with Normal
1984	"Lovers in a Dangerous Time"	25	8	—	—	—	56	—	Stealing Fire
1984	"Making Contact"	74	—	—	—	—	—	—	Stealing Fire
1984	"If I Had a Rocket Launcher"	49	—	—	—	88	16	—	Stealing Fire
1985	"Peggy's Kitchen Wall"	88	—	—	—	—	—	—	Stealing Fire
1986	"People See Through You"	37	4	—	—	—	—	—	World of Wonders
1986	"Call It Democracy"	—	—	—	—	—	—	—	World of Wonders
1986	"See How I Miss You"	81	—	—	—	—	—	—	World of Wonders
1987	"Waiting for a Miracle"	50	12	—	—	—	—	—	Waiting for a Miracle
1989	"If A Tree Falls"	8	—	41	—	—	—	20	Big Circumstance
1989	"Don't Feel Your Touch"	43	—	—	—	—	—	—	Big Circumstance
1989	"Shipwrecked at the Stable Door"	92	22	—	—	—	—	—	Big Circumstance
1991	"A Dream Like Mine"	16	5	175	87	—	—	22	Nothing but a Burning Light
1992	"Great Big Love"	27	12	—	—	—	—	—	Nothing but a Burning Light
1992	"Mighty Trucks of Midnight"	67	12	—	—	—	—		Nothing but a Burning Light
1992	"Somebody Touched Me"	49	8	—	—	—	—	—	Nothing but a Burning Light
1994	"Listen for the Laugh"	18	9	—	—	—	—	—	Dart to the Heart
1994	"Scanning These Crowds"	42	21	—	—	—	—	—	Dart to the Heart
1995	"Someone I Used to Love"	—	36	—	—	—	—	—	Dart to the Heart
1997	"Night Train"	25	10	—	—	—	—	—	The Charity of Night
1999	"Last Night of the World"^{[5]}	—	28	—	—	—	—	—	Breakfast in New Orleans, Dinner in Timbuktu

Notes

- 1 O Sun O Moon did not chart on the Billboard 200, although it did reach No. 98 on the Billboard Top Current Album Sales chart.
- 2 "Going to the Country" peaked at No. 4 on the RPM Adult Contemporary (A/C) chart in November 1970. However, at the time, and for the Adult Contemporary chart only, RPM only charted A/C songs that qualified as Canadian Content. This policy was changed mid-way through the song's chart run, and all A/C records regardless of national origin were eligible for the chart. Under these new criteria, "Going to the Country" peaked at No. 11 in December 1970.
- 3 "Wondering Where the Lions Are" also peaked at No. 22 on the US Billboard Adult Contemporary chart.
- 4 The song "Fascist Architecture" was released to radio under the title "I'm Okay". It peaked at No. 1 on the RPM Adult Contemporary (A/C) chart in March 1981. However, at the time, and for the Adult Contemporary chart only, RPM once only charted A/C songs that qualified as Canadian Content. This short-lived policy was abandoned later in 1981.
- 5 "Last Night of the World" also reached No. 9 on the US Billboard Adult Alternative Airplay chart.
