= Resume (Bruce Cockburn album) =

Greatest hits album by Bruce Cockburn
- Released: May 1981
- Recorded: 1976–1978, 1981
- Length: 41:47
- Label: Millennium
- Producer: Gene Martynec

Bruce Cockburn chronology
Humans (1980)	Resume (1981)	Inner City Front (1981)

Singles from Resume
- 1. "The Coldest Night of the Year" Released: May 1981

Resume is a compilation album released in 1981 by the Canadian singer-songwriter Bruce Cockburn. It was released in various territories outside of Canada, including the United States, where it was issued on the Millennium Records label and distributed by RCA Records. Within a few weeks of its release, Resume peaked at No. 174 on the US Billboard 200.

== Background ==
Much of the material on Resume consisted of songs that had been previously unavailable in the United States. Canada received the Mummy Dust compilation album instead of Resume; both of these albums containing variations in the track listings. "The Coldest Night of the Year", a newly recorded track that was also issued as a single, was one of three shared songs across both compilations. The previously issued "Silver Wheels" and "Laughter" were also included on both Resume and Mummy Dust.

With the exception of "The Coldest Night of the Year" every song on Resume originated from a Cockburn album from 1976–1978. This included material found on Circles in the Stream, In the Falling Dark, and Further Adventures Of, while omitting the two album that preceded Resume, specifically Dancing in the Dragon's Jaws and Humans. The track listing for Resume was handpicked by Cockburn, who had selected "The Coldest Night of the Year" so that Resume would not exclusively be a retrospective release.

== Critical reception ==
Professional ratings
Review scores
Source	Rating
AllMusic	2.5/5 stars
The Village Voice	B+

Cashbox referred to Resume as "more or less a Cockburn primer" that showcased Cockburn's songwriting and appeal. Billboard characterized Resume as an "excellent" entry-point in Cockburn's discography. They also believed that the material from 1976–1978 aged well and selected "Silver Wheels", "The Coldest Night of the Year", and "Outside A Broken Phone Booth With Money in My Hand" as the album's best songs.

Record World labeled "Silver Wheels" and "Water Into Wine" as the album's highlights. Robert Christgau of The Village Voice discussed the dichotomy of the album's "hip/cool" material with Cockburn's more introspective compositions, saying that "if [Cockburn] caps "Mama Just Wants to Barrelhouse All Night Long" with "Lord of the Starfields," just how raunchy is his barrelhouse likely to be? I'll take smart and nice over hip/cool anytime, and this best-of showcases his conventional wisdom at its most eloquent."

In a retrospective review, Rob Caldwell of AllMusic called Resume "a decent introduction to [Cockburn's] late-'70s work". He believed that the album showcased several aspects of Cockburn's attributes as a musician, including his guitar playing, songwriting, and ability to handle material ranging from rock music to more intimate compositions.

== Track listing ==
All tracks are written by Bruce Cockburn.

Side one
No.	Title	Album of origin	Length
1.	"Silver Wheels"	In the Falling Dark	4:41
2.	"The Coldest Night of the Year"	New song	4:00
3.	"Can I Go With You"	Further Adventures Of	2:30
4.	"Laughter"	Further Adventures Of	3:38
5.	"Water Into Wine"	In the Falling Dark	5:30

Side two
No.	Title	Album of origin	Length
6.	"Mama Just Wants To Barrelhouse All Night Long"	Circles in the Stream; (originally from Night Vision)	4:14
7.	"Lord of the Starfields"	In the Falling Dark	3:22
8.	"Outside a Broken Phone Booth with Money in My Hand"	Further Adventures Of	4:53
9.	"Dialogue with the Devil"	Circles in the Stream; (originally from Sunwheel Dance)	8:50

== Personnel ==
- Bruce Cockburn – vocals (tracks 1–4, 6–9), guitars (all tracks)
- Bob DiSalle – drums (tracks 1–2, 4, 7–8)
- Michel Donato – bass (tracks 1, 7)
- Fred Stone – flugelhorn (track 1)
- Bill Usher – percussion (tracks 1, 7)
- Dennis Pendrith – bass (track 2)
- Jon Goldsmith – keyboards (track 2)
- John T. Davis – organ (track 2)
- Hugh Marsh – violin (track 2)
- Kathy Moses – saxophone & backing vocals (track 2), flute (tracks 3–4)
- Robert Boucher – bass guitar (tracks 3–4, 8)
- Gene Martynec – electric guitar (tracks 3, 8)
- Beverly Glenn-Copeland – backing vocals (tracks 3, 8)
- Marty Nagler – backing vocals (track 4)
- Tommy Graham – backing vocals (track 4)
- Brent Titcomb – backing vocals (track 4)
- Shingoose – backing vocals (track 4)

Production

- Gene Martnec – producer
- Ken Friesen – engineer (tracks 1, 3–9)
- Gary Gray – engineer (track 2)
- Dave Taylor – assistant engineer (track 2)
- Peter Holcomb – assistant engineer (tracks 3–4, 8)

== Chart performance ==
Chart (1981)	Peak position
US Billboard 200	174
