= Mummy Dust =

Greatest hits album by Bruce Cockburn
- Released: May 1981
- Recorded: 1969–1981
- Length: 44:51
- Label: True North
- Producer: Gene Martynec

Bruce Cockburn chronology
Humans (1980)	Mummy Dust (1981)	Inner City Front (1981)

Singles from Mummy Dust
- 1. "The Coldest Night of the Year" Released: June 1981

Mummy Dust is a compilation album released in 1981 by the Canadian singer-songwriter Bruce Cockburn. It was released exclusively in Canada by True North Records, with other countries including the United States receiving the compilation album Resume in 1981.

Mummy Dust combines previously issued songs with four previously unreleased tracks. The album peaked at No. 43 Canadian albums chart and spawned the top 50 single "The Coldest Night of the Year".

== Background ==
Released in 1981 by True North Records and distributed by CBS, Mummy Dust is a Canadian-exclusive album that includes four previously unreleased songs, specifically "Loner", "Red Brother Red Sister", "Dweller By A Dark Stream", and "The Coldest Night of the Year", the latter of which was released as a single. According to Cockburn's manager Bernie Finkelstein, the tracks on Mummy Dust were consist of favorites of his and Cockburn.

Compared to Resume, a compilation released the same year outside of Canada, Mummy Dust shares "The Coldest Night of the Year", "Silver Wheels", and "Laughter", with all remaining tracks being otherwise unique. The song "Loner", which is exclusive to Mummy Dust, was previewed live in 1980, whereas Cockburn debuted "The Coldest Night of the Year" live in January 1981.

The studio version of "Loner" was recorded in March 1980 and "The Coldest Night of the Year" was recorded in March 1981. Both "Red Brother Red Sister" and "Dweller By a Dark Stream" date back to 1976 during the In the Falling Dark sessions, but had remained unreleased in a studio form up until Mummy Dust. "Red Brother Red Sister", a song that had first appeared on Cockburn's 1977 Circles in the Stream live album, is set to a slow shuffle rhythm with lyrics centered around the plight of indigenous Canadians that was perpetrated by white colonists. Cockburn later reworked "Loner" for his Inner City Front album released the same year.

The remainder of Mummy Dust comprises seven songs from Cockburn's discography, with one dating back to his self-titled debut album recorded in 1969.

== Critical reception ==
Professional ratings
Review scores
Source	Rating
AllMusic	3/5 stars

Reviewing the album for Windsor Star, Ted Shaw characterized Mummy Dust as a contrast with Cockburn's more rock-oriented material found on his more recent releases. Writing for the Ottawa Citizen, Bill Provick described the new tracks on Mummy Dust as being "in the quieter, more reflective vein Cockburn specialized in" prior to Cockburn's 1980 Humans album. He felt that the tracks would have been better presented as an extended play rather than part of a larger compilation album.

In a retrospective review, Rob Caldwell of AllMusic said the inclusion of four previously unreleased recordings made Mummy Dust an "attractive buy".

== Track listing ==
All tracks are written by Bruce Cockburn.

Side one
No.	Title	Album of origin	Length
1.	"Silver Wheels"	In the Falling Dark	4:37
2.	"Loner"	previously unreleased	6:00
3.	"Joy Will Find a Way"	Joy Will Find a Way	4:08
4.	"Thoughts On A Rainy Afternoon"	Bruce Cockburn	3:38
5.	"It's Going Down Slow"	Sunwheel Dance	3:31

Side two
No.	Title	Album of origin	Length
6.	"The Coldest Night of the Year"	previously unreleased	3:58
7.	"Laughter"	Further Adventures Of	3:35
8.	"Red Brother Red Sister"	previously unreleased; original live recording found on Circles In The Stream	4:11
9.	"You Don't Have To Play The Horses"	Night Vision	3:42
10.	"Dweller By A Dark Stream"	previously unreleased	4:15
11.	"All The Diamonds In The World"	Salt, Sun and Time	3:42

== Personnel ==
- Bruce Cockburn – vocals (all tracks), guitars (tracks 1–8, 10–11), bells (track 3), piano (track 5), banjo (track 9)
- Gene Martynec – guitar (tracks 3, 11), synthesizer (track 11)
- Michel Donato – bass (track 1)
- Dennis Pendrith – bass (tracks 2, 5–6, 8–10)
- Robert Boucher – bass (track 7)
- Jon Goldsmith – keyboards (tracks 2, 6)
- Patricia Cullen – synthesizer (track 2)
- John T. Davis – organ (track 6)
- Pat Godfrey – piano (track 9)
- Bob DiSalle – drums (tracks 1–2, 6–7)
- John Savage – drums (track 5), percussion (track 9)
- Jørn Anderson – drums (tracks 8, 10)
- Bill Usher – percussion (track 1)
- Hugh Marsh – violin (tracks 2, 6)
- Tommy Graham – tambora (track 3), backing vocals (track 7)
- Fred Stone – flugelhorn (track 1)
- Kathy Moses – saxophone & backing vocals (track 6), flute (track 7)
- Beverly Glenn-Copeland – backing vocals (tracks 3, 7)
- Marty Nagler – backing vocals (track 7)
- Brent Titcomb – backing vocals track 7)
- Shingoose – backing vocals (track 7)
- Ronney Abramson – backing vocals (track 8)

== Chart performance ==
Chart (1981)	Peak position
Canada Top Albums/CDs (RPM)	43
