= Silver wheels =

Silver Wheels may refer to four separate music pieces:

- "Silver Wheels", a track on Heart's 1980 album Bébé le Strange
- Silver Wheels, the opening acoustic intro on Heart's 1975/1976 single "Crazy on You".
- "Silver Wheels", a track on Eddie Meduza's 1997 album with the same title.
- “Silver Wheels,” a track on Bruce Cockburn’s 1976 album, In the Falling Dark.
