= Waiting for a Miracle =

Waiting for a Miracle may refer to:

- Waiting for a Miracle (album), a 1980 album by The Comsat Angels
- Waiting for a Miracle (film), a 2007 Russian romantic comedy-drama film
- "Waiting for a Miracle", a song by Post Malone from the album Twelve Carat Toothache
- "Waiting for a Miracle", an album and song by Bruce Cockburn

== See also ==
- "Waiting for the Miracle", a song by Leonard Cohen from the album The Future
- "Waiting on a Miracle", a song from Encanto
