= The Trouble with Normal (album) =

Studio album by Bruce Cockburn
- Released: 1983
- Recorded: September 1982 – January 1983
- Genre: Pop rock
- Length: 42:22
- Label: True North
- Producer: Gene Martynec

Bruce Cockburn chronology
Inner City Front (1981)	The Trouble with Normal (1983)	Stealing Fire (1984)

Singles from The Trouble with Normal
- 1. "The Trouble With Normal" Released: 1983

The Trouble with Normal is a 1983 studio album by Canadian singer-songwriter Bruce Cockburn. The album contains nine songs (eleven in the 2002 remastered release). It marks a continuing shift from Cockburn's early folk-influenced and "mystic" acoustic works, featuring electric guitar and synthesizers, but the lyrical themes build on earlier albums. The Trouble with Normal reached No. 14 on the Canadian albums chart and later received a gold certification in that country for sales of 50,000 units. True North released a remastered deluxe version on November 19, 2002, which includes two extra tracks recorded during the same sessions.

== Background ==
The song "Hoop Dancer" was written a few years prior to the release of The Trouble with Normal while in Tokyo. In an interview with Canadian Musician magazine published in August 1981, Cockburn mentioned that "Hoop Dancer" had been considered for a jazz-oriented album for ECM Records. He described "Hoop Dancer" as a "mixture between poetry and song and jazzy instrumental stuff" that was roughly 20 minutes in length, although he had yet to record it at the time the interview was conducted. He explained that the song's lyrics, which includes references to urban and rural landscapes, were about perceiving time as a continuum. "Hoop Dancer" was completed for The Trouble With Normal, making it the first time a Bruce Cockburn album had included a song with spoken word.

Cockburn had read a book of poetry written by Ernesto Cardenal while vacationing in the Canary Islands, which inspired the songs "Tropic Moon", "Waiting for the Moon", and "Planet of Clowns". "Tropic Moon" was written as a rebuke of the United States government for its interventionism in Nicaragua. "Civilization and Its Discontents" takes its title from a book of the same name by Sigmund Freud, while the title track includes commentary on labor strikes and struggles faced by tenants.

== Release ==
Prior to the album's release, Cockburn took a fact-finding mission to Central America for over two weeks, which included a visit to a refugee camp in Mexico. He and Nancy White, who accompanied Cockburn on the trip, also met with Allan MacEachen and Lloyd Axworthy on March 10. Upon his return, Cockburn urged the Canadian government to support the Sandinista National Liberation Front in Nicaragua and said that the Canadian government's support of US intervention in Guatemala made them "participants in virtual genocide". A spring tour was arranged to promote The Trouble With Normal, which began on March 24, 1983. Accompanying Cockburn on the tour were Bob DiSalle on drums and vocals, Dennis Pendrith on bass and vocals, John Goldsmith on keyboards, and Hugh Marsh on violin. The title track was also released as a single around the same time, with "Cala Luna" being included as the B-side.

In the United States, where Millennium Records had handled the release of Cockburn's last few albums, The Trouble With Normal was instead released on the Gold Mountain Records label in 1985, with A&M Records handling the distribution. Their 1985 release of the album contained a re-recorded version of the title track. The 2002 remastered edition of The Trouble With Normal included two bonus songs. One of those tracks, "I Wanna Dance With You", contained lyrics that were included on two of Cockburn's later songs, "Lovers in a Dangerous Time" and "When You Give It Away". The other song, "Cala Luna", is an instrumental that Cockburn wrote on the island of Sardinia.

== Critical reception ==
Professional ratings
Review scores
Source	Rating
AllMusic	4/5 stars

RPM discussed some the sociopolitical underpinnings of Cockburn's work on The Trouble of Normal. They highlighting the title track and "Put Your Hearts Together" as examples of the pointed commentary found on the album. The publication identified lyrical themes centered around "some of the miseries of the world" and believed that they could be construed as "negative or downers" by listeners. They concluded their review by saying that Cockburn's "songwriting and performance talents go without question. The pitch is professional with a cool edge of highly entertaining sarcasm." Cashbox called the album a "gem" that represented a "strong moral conscience from a master and true believer".

In a retrospective review, AllMusic critic Brett Hartenbach wrote, "Like his two previous efforts in the '80s, The Trouble with Normal places Bruce Cockburn yet another step further from his days as Canada's resident mystic folky. And while he had touched on similar musical themes on earlier recordings, the eclectic blend of folk, rock, and world music here is much more defined and realized... There is the tendency to get heavy-handed at times, but still, The Trouble With Normal contains some of Cockburn's most beautifully imagistic writing to date and is another strong effort."

== Track listing ==
All tracks are written by Bruce Cockburn.

No.	Title	Length
1.	"The Trouble with Normal"	3:35
2.	"Candy Man's Gone"	4:00
3.	"Hoop Dancer"	7:48
4.	"Waiting for the Moon"	4:22
5.	"Tropic Moon"	4:38
6.	"Going Up Against Chaos"	5:31
7.	"Put Our Hearts Together"	4:25
8.	"Civilization and Its Discontents"	4:16
9.	"Planet of the Clowns"	3:47

Remastered additional tracks
No.	Title	Length
10.	"Cala Luna"	5:06
11.	"I Wanna Dance with You"	4:35

"Cala Luna" was originally released as a bonus track on the cassette, at the end of side 1, after "Waiting for the Moon".

== Personnel ==
- Bruce Cockburn – vocals, guitar, dulcimer
- Jon Goldsmith – keyboards
- Hugh Marsh – mandolin, violin
- Dennis Pendrith – bass, Chapman Stick
- Bob DiSalle – drums
- Dick Smith – percussion
- Shaun Jackson – backing vocals
- Colina Phillips – backing vocals

Production

- Gene Martynec – producer
- Gary Gray – engineer
- George Marino – mastering
- Vladimir Meller – remastering
- Sharon Williams – backing vocals
- George Whiteside – photography
- Michael Wurstin – art direction

== Chart performance ==
=== Weekly charts ===
Chart (1983)	Peak position
Canada Top Albums/CDs (RPM)	14

=== Year-end charts ===
Chart (1983)	Position
Canada Top Albums (RPM)	86

== Certifications ==
Certifications and sales for The Trouble with Normal
Region	Certification	Certified units/sales
Canada (Music Canada)	Gold	50,000^{^}
^{*} Sales figures based on certification alone.^{^} Shipments figures based on certification alone.
