= High Winds, White Sky =

Studio album by Bruce Cockburn
- Released: 1971
- Recorded: November 1970–April 1971
- Studios: Thunder and Toronto Eastern
- Genre: Folk
- Length: 44:54
- Label: True North
- Producer: Eugene Martynec

Bruce Cockburn chronology
Bruce Cockburn (1970)	High Winds, White Sky (1971)	Sunwheel Dance (1972)

Singles from High Winds, White Sky
- 1. "One Day I Walk" Released: 1971

High Winds, White Sky is the second studio album from Bruce Cockburn, released in 1971 on the True North label. It peaked at No. 26 on the RPM 100 Albums chart in Canada and spawned the single "One Day I Walk", which became Cockburn's first charting song on the RPM Top Singles chart. The album received a Canadian gold record award in 1986 for sales of 100,000 units. In 2003, Rounder Records remastered the album with two bonus tracks recorded live in 1970.

== Background ==
Cockburn wrote "One Day I Walk" about busking, which he said was "a scary proposition" that had little appeal to him in a 2010 interview with The Globe and Mail. He explained that he would only consider street performing if it was his only means of financially sustaining himself. "One Day I Walk" was also released as a single, with RPM labeling it as Cockburn's "first entry with enough of the needed commerciality to appeal to Top 40 programmers."

The Canadian publication RPM attributed some of the album's "solid sales success" to campus radio stations across the country, which provided airplay to several of its songs, particularity the title track. Cockburn's popularity within that market was further bolstered by his performance opening at Convocation Hall at University of Toronto. He also completed a one week stint at Riverboat Coffee House in Toronto, which consisted of some sing-along songs that Cockburn played on the piano along with other folk-oriented songs.

In 2003, High Winds, White Sky was reissued and remastered with two additional bonus tracks, which were recorded live at The Bitter Grounds Coffee House at Queen's University at Kingston on January 23, 1970. Doug McClement, who at the time was a high school student, had secured permission from Cockburn to record this show, which was done using a single microphone and a cassette deck. Cockburn had played this show after the recording of his 1970 Bruce Cockburn album but prior to its release. By this point in his career, Cockburn was also playing songs that he would later record for High Winds, White Sky. Both "Totem Pole" and "It's an Elephant's World" were performed live at the January 23, 1970 performance and considered for High Winds, White Sky, although neither of them were ever recorded in the studio.

== Critical reception ==
Professional ratings
Review scores
Source	Rating
AllMusic	3/5 stars

In a contemporary review, RPM wrote that "beautiful packaging conceals an equally beautiful album" and that every song was "outstanding".

In a retrospective review, music critic Thom Jurek, writing for AllMusic, called the album "a remarkably fresh and timeless recording... Overall, however, this album—like Sunwheel Dance that follows it—presents a far more mystical Cockburn. His tenderness and poetic vision are almost pastoral on these early recordings, something that would get burned off and become hard-bitten (if no less romantic and more dramatic) as his music and social vision grew."

== Track listing ==
All tracks are written by Bruce Cockburn.

No.	Title	Length
1.	"Happy Good Morning Blues"	2:39
2.	"Let Us Go Laughing"	5:20
3.	"Love Song"	2:26
4.	"One Day I Walk"	3:06
5.	"Golden Serpent Blues"	3:33
6.	"High Winds White Sky"	3:01
7.	"You Point to the Sky"	2:56
8.	"Life's Mistress"	3:24
9.	"Ting/the Cauldron"	6:30
10.	"Shining Mountain"	5:14

Remastered additional tracks
No.	Title	Length
11.	"Totem Pole (live)"	3:25
12.	"It's an Elephant World (live)"	2:39

Tracks 2 thru 9 recorded at RCA's Thunder Sound Studios, Toronto
Tracks 1 and 10 recorded at Eastern Sound Studios, Toronto
Tracks 11 and 12 recorded live on January 23, 1970 at the Bitter Grounds Coffee House in Kingston, Ontario

== Personnel ==
- Bruce Cockburn – guitars, dulcimer (track 10)
- Eugene Martynec – guitar (tracks 6–7)
- Eric Nagler – mandolin-banjo (tracks 2–3), mandolin (track 10)
- Michael Craydon – marimba, tables, tree bell, boobams, and Pygmy Rhythm Log (track 9)
- John Wyre – cymbals, gongs, and salad bowls (track 9)

Production

- Eugene Martynec – producer
- Henry Saskowski – engineer at Thunder Sound Studios
- Chris Skene – engineer at Eastern Sound

== Chart performance ==
Chart (1971)	Peak position
Canada Top Albums (RPM)	26

== Certifications ==
Certifications and sales for High Winds, White Sky
Region	Certification	Certified units/sales
Canada (Music Canada)	Gold	50,000^{^}
^{*} Sales figures based on certification alone.^{^} Shipments figures based on certification alone.
