= Further Adventures Of =

Album by Bruce Cockburn

Studio album by Bruce Cockburn
- Released: 1978
- Recorded: April – May 1978
- Genres: Folk, pop
- Length: 42:14
- Label: True North
- Producer: Eugene Martynec

Bruce Cockburn chronology
In the Falling Dark (1977)	Further Adventures Of (1978)	Dancing in the Dragon's Jaws (1979)

Further Adventures Of is the eighth studio album by Canadian singer/songwriter Bruce Cockburn. The album was released in 1978 by True North Records. The title of the album is not "Further Adventures of Bruce Cockburn" and the original album cover the title is simply "Further Adventures Of". The album cover displays a picture of a small globe of the Earth after the title, implying that the adventures referred to are those of the planet Earth, not of Cockburn.

Cockburn commented that Further Adventures Of contained a blend of genres, saying that it was the most electric guitar work he had done since his Night Vision album. The song "Bright Sky" was inspired by Cockburn's time playing at a folk festival in Faro, Yukon. Cockburn wrote "Nanzen Ji" while touring in Japan with Murray McLauchlan. "Prenons La Mer" includes lyrics in both English and French.

To promote the album, Cockburn embarked on a tour that began in June 1978 and concluded on October 28 at Massey Hall in Toronto. Cockburn expressed hope that Further Adventures Of would attain commercial success outside of Canada, partially for the opportunity to travel to "exotic places" and interact with its residents so that he could "taste the local flavor".

== Critical reception ==
Professional ratings
Review scores
Source	Rating
AllMusic	3/5 stars
The Rolling Stone Album Guide	3/5 stars

Writing for The Boston Globe, Frank Dudgeon wrote that Further Adventures Of was "a fine introduction to Cockburn's work" and "the latest in a series of finely crafted, consistently interesting LPs from a gifted artist." He selected "Laughter" as one of the album's highlights, specifically citing the chorus as "joyous".

In a retrospective review, AllMusic critic Brett Hartenbach wrote, "though it may contain Bruce Cockburn's usual mix of beautifully intricate acoustic work and pastoral mysticism, along with the occasional touches of anger and irony, continues the growth that was so evident on his last studio outing In the Falling Dark... it serves as another steppingstone to what would be the most impressive period of his career".

== Track listing ==
All tracks are written by Bruce Cockburn.

No.	Title	Length
1.	"Rainfall"	3:48
2.	"A Montréal Song"	4:06
3.	"Outside a Broken Phone Booth with Money in My Hand"	4:53
4.	"Prenons La Mur"	2:38
5.	"Red Ships Take Off in the Distance"	5:15
6.	"Laughter"	3:38
7.	"Bright Sky"	4:01
8.	"Feast of Fools"	6:42
9.	"Can I Go with You"	2:30
10.	"Nanzen Ji"	4:43

Remastered additional tracks
No.	Title	Length
11.	"Mountain Call"	5:34

== Album credits ==
Personnel

- Bruce Cockburn – composer, vocals, guitar
- Robert Boucher – bass guitar
- Bob DiSalle – drums
- Eugene Martynec – guitar
- Kathryn Moses – flute
- Beverly Glenn-Copeland – backing vocals on 1, 3, 6–7, and 9
- Marty Nagler – backing vocals on 6 and 7
- Tommy Graham – backing vocals on 6 and 7
- Brent Titcomb – backing vocals on 6 and 7
- Shingoose – backing vocals on 2 and 6–8
- Ronney Abramson – backing vocals on 4

Production

- Marcel Mousette – translation
- Eugene Martynec – producer
- Ken Friesen – engineer
- Peter Holcomb – engineer's assistant
- Bart Schoales – art direction
- Fred Bird – model photograph
- Bernie Finkelstein – direction

== Chart performance ==
Chart (1978)	Peak position
Canada Top Albums (RPM)	65
