= If I Had a Rocket Launcher =

Single by Bruce Cockburn

from the album Stealing Fire
- Released: 1984
- Genre: Pop rock
- Length: 4:58
- Label: True North, Gold Mountain
- Songwriter: Bruce Cockburn
- Producers: Jon Goldsmith, Kerry Crawford

Bruce Cockburn singles chronology
| "Making Contact" (1984) | "If I Had a Rocket Launcher" (1984) | "People See Through You" (1986) |

"If I Had a Rocket Launcher" is a song by Canadian singer-songwriter Bruce Cockburn, from his 1984 album Stealing Fire. A visit to Central America prompted Cockburn to write the song. Released as a single, "If I Had a Rocket Launcher" reached the national singles chart in both Canada and United States.

== Background ==
"If I Had a Rocket Launcher" was inspired by Cockburn's visit, sponsored by Oxfam, to Guatemalan refugee camps in Mexico, where he witnessed helicopters attacking refugees. He said in a 2010 interview that the song was intended to express his dismay over the plight of Guatemalan refugees. Speaking on the song's subject matter, Cockburn said that "one of the most striking things was seeing the strength of people in incredibly desperate situations."

Cockburn was concerned that "If I Had a Rocket Launcher" would be misinterpreted by some listeners as a call to violence and almost decided against recording it for this reason. He ultimately decided to go forward with including the song on Stealing Fire over his belief that listeners would understand the song's intent.

On "If I Had a Rocket Launcher", Cockburn despairs of waiting for a political solution to the crisis, and expresses the desire to take matters into his own hands. Each verse ends with a line stating what Cockburn would do if he had a rocket launcher: in the first verse, "I'd make somebody pay". In the second, "I would retaliate". In the third, "I would not hesitate". The fourth and final verse ends with the lyric: "If I had a rocket launcher, some son-of-a-bitch would die".

== Release ==
The song received considerable airplay on Canadian radio in early 1985, with many radio stations played an edited version which faded out before the "son-of-a-bitch" lyric was heard. The song peaked at No. 49 on the Canadian charts in the week of March 2, 1985. It reached the Top 40 in some individual markets – for example, it peaked at No. 24 on the CHUM Chart in Toronto.

In the United States, "If I Had a Rocket Launcher" was released in January 1985. It first entered at No. 103 on the Billboard Bubbling Under Hot 100 chart during the week ending February 2, 1985. The song reached No. 88 on the Billboard Hot 100 the following month, spending a total of three weeks on the listing. It was Cockburn's only single besides "Wondering Where the Lions Are" to reach the Top 100 in that country. "If I Had a Rocket Launcher" received a music video that was launched on MTV, where it received some rotation. The music video featured photographs of refugee camps.

In an interview published in Billboard, Cockburn expressed his belief that politically oriented songs were not incompatible with Top 40 radio programming, citing "Two Tribes" by Frankie Goes to Hollywood and "The War Song" by Culture Club as examples of socially conscious music that managed to attain commercial success. Cockburn was pleasantly surprised that the song had received airplay in the United States, where chart success had largely eluded him since his song "Wondering Where the Lions Are" from his 1979 album Dancing in the Dragon's Jaws.

Commenting further on the single's commercial success, Cockburn said that "Of all the songs I'd put out that I thought would have had radio possibilities, that wasn't one. A lot of people who didn't even know that it was about Guatemala responded to the sense of outrage in it, and that made it popular. It was a very interesting phenomenon because I never would have imagined in a million years that anybody would play that on the radio, and yet they did. And people ask for it to this day."

=== Use by the United States Armed Forces ===
"If I Had a Rocket Launcher" was one of the songs used by the United States government as part of their psychological operations to force Manuel Noriega out of hiding in the Holy See after they indicted him for drug trafficking. The music came from the US-operated Southern Command Network, who played loud music from a fleet of humvees decked with loudspeakers for three consecutive days.

== Critical reception ==
Cashbox characterized "If I Had a Rocket Launcher" as "an impassioned song about the need for humanity in South America". Reviewing a live performance of the song that Cockburn did in November 1984 at Park West, Moira McCormick wrote in Billboard that "If I Had a Rocket Launcher" was "the most effective portion of his performance", adding that it was "powerful stuff, yet not oppressive–but certainly provocative and eminently musical." Greg Quil called "If I Had a Rocket Launcher" the "strangest and most unsettling piece" on Stealing Fire, quipping that it was "quite a turn-around for a former Christian pacifist."

== Live performances ==
Cockburn recalled performing the song at the Greenbelt Festival in England, where he was startled by the response, saying that "to hear two thousand people sing 'some son-of-a-bitch would die' is very disturbing, but they were singing it with great gusto and loved the song."

After the September 11 attacks, Cockburn temporarily stopped playing the song over fears of inciting violence. He eventually restored the song to his live setlists including in 2009 when he performed the song for Canadian troops in Afghanistan; he was subsequently presented (temporarily) with a rocket launcher.

== Personnel ==
- Bruce Cockburn – guitars and vocals
- Jon Goldsmith – keyboards
- Fergus Marsh – bass
- Miche Pouliot – drums
- Chi Sharpe – percussion

== Charts ==
| Chart (1985) | Peak position |
|---|---|
| Canada Top Singles (RPM) | 49 |
| US Billboard Hot 100 | 88 |
| US Mainstream Rock (Billboard) | 16 |
