= Rocket launcher (disambiguation) =

A rocket launcher is a device used to launch a rocket. It may also refer to:

- Rocket jumping, a movement technique used in first-person shooter video games
- Rocket Launcher, a maneuver in professional wrestling
- If I Had a Rocket Launcher, a 1984 song by Bruce Cockburn
