= The Charity of Night =

Studio album by Bruce Cockburn
- Released: February 1997
- Recorded: 1996
- Studios: Reaction Studios; Record Plant; Bob Weir's Studio; Electro Magnetic Sound
- Genre: Folk rock
- Labels: True North (Canada); Rykodisc (United States)
- Producers: Bruce Cockburn; Colin Linden

Bruce Cockburn chronology
Dart to the Heart (1994)	The Charity of Night (1997)	Breakfast in New Orleans, Dinner in Timbuktu (1999)

The Charity of Night is an album by the Canadian musician Bruce Cockburn. It was released in 1997 by True North Records in Canada and Rykodisc in the United States.

The album peaked at No. 70 in Canada and No. 178 in the United States. "Night Train" was released as a single, which peaked at No. 25 on the Canadian Top Singles chart, becoming Cockburn's final song to appear on this listing. Later in 1997, The Charity of Night was certified Gold in Canada for shipments exceeding 50,000 units.

== Background ==
Cockburn served as the producer for The Charity of Night, making it his third studio album where he took on this responsibility after Inner City Front (1981) and Christmas (1993). Colin Linden provided assistance with the album's production at the request of Cockburn to provide more technical expertise and "a critical set of ears". The album's booklet artwork was created by the comic artist Bill Sienkiewicz.

When discussing The Charity of Night with RPM magazine, Cockburn said he felt that "some kind of corner has been turned with this album" and that he noticed "a subtle but noticeable change in direction" with the material.

"Pacing the Cage" was a created after Cockburn had jotted the phrase down in a notebook. Cockburn mentioned in an interview with the Times Colonist that he uttered the phrase frequently, which prompted him to make a mental note of it. Jimmy Buffett covered "Pacing the Cage" on his 1999 album Beach House on the Moon, with his version reaching No. 79 on the Canadian Adult Contemporary Tracks chart. Cockburn wrote "The Mines of Mozambique" during a visit to the country two years prior, where learned about the impact of land mines on victims, how to locate these weapons in the ground, and how to assemble and disassemble them.

== Release ==
To promote The Charity of Night, an advertising campaign was launched by True North Records and MCA that included print advertising in publications such as Rolling Stone and Musician magazine and television appearances on Late Night with David Letterman, The Tonight Show with Jay Leno, and Late Night with Conan O'Brien. This was augmented with trade advertisements, internet promotion, and a tour. Reviewing Cockburn's April performance at The Town Hall in New York City, Neil Strauss noted that Cockburn's setup included a rack of chimes on his left that he would kick "occasionally, for atmosphere".

In the United States, The Charity of Night was Cockburn's first release on the Rykodisc label. Mike Marrone, who served as the National Director of Promotion for Rkyodisc, said that the label's primary focus was on Album Adult Alternative (AAA) radio and that Cockburn's chart placement on the Gavin Report's AAA chart "was was a big deal to us." Marrone said that Cockburn's music had met with more resistance on more adult-oriented radio programming. He believed that most radio stations were unwilling to place a concerted effort to add Coburn's music to their playlists over their belief that Cockburn was "not an automatic heavy like would have been four years ago."

== Critical reception ==
Professional ratings
Review scores
Source	Rating
AllMusic	4/5 stars
Chicago Tribune	3/4 stars

Writing for the Chicago Tribune, Steve Knopper identified contrast between the "pretty and upbeat melodies" and the "heavy and indignant" lyrics on The Charity of Night. He commented that the album's "frequent high points — such as the fiery guitar at the end of “Strange Waters” — come when words and music achieve the same intensity." Mac Randall likened the album's songs to "sprawling mood pieces, conjuring a sense of immense natural forces at play." He expressed his belief that the album was bogged down by too many instances of spoken word, although he was more complimentary of the closing song "Strange Waters", saying that the guitar solo "bites so hard and deep you can practically see the bone coming exposed."

In a retrospective review, Rob Caldwell of AllMusic called The Charity of Night "a very cohesive album in subject, with only the anti-land mine "Mines of Mozambique" seeming out of place", adding that the song was "a worthwhile song on its own". Caldwell described the album's instrumentation as "organic" and identified The Charity of Night as "an essential part of the Cockburn catalog."

== Track listing ==
All songs written by Bruce Cockburn.

No.	Title	Length
1.	"Night Train"	6:16
2.	"Get Up Jonah"	5:03
3.	"Pacing The Cage"	4:41
4.	"Mistress of Storms"	6:12
5.	"The Whole Night Sky"	3:54
6.	"The Coming Rains"	4:49
7.	"Birmingham Shadows"	9:41
8.	"The Mines of Mozambique"	6:14
9.	"Live on My Mind"	6:46
10.	"The Charity of Night"	8:05
11.	"Strange Waters"	5:50

== Personnel ==
Musicians

- Bruce Cockburn – acoustic, electric guitars and resonator guitars, vocals
- Bonnie Raitt – slide guitar (track 5)
- Colin Linden – mandolin (tracks 5, 10)
- Rob Wasserman – bass (tracks 1–3, 5–11)
- Janice Powers – keyboards (tracks 3, 5, 8–9)
- Joseph Macerollo – accordion (tracks 5, 10)
- Gary Craig – drums (tracks 1–2, 5–9, 11), percussion (tracks 1, 5–6, 8)
- Gary Burton – vibraphone (tracks 2, 4, 6–7, 9–10)
- Jonatha Brooke – backing vocals (tracks 1–2, 6, 8–9, 11)
- Patty Larkin – backing vocals (tracks 1, 6, 11)
- Ani DiFranco – backing vocals (track 2)
- Bob Weir – backing vocals (track 5)
- Maria Muldaur – backing vocals (track 6)

Technical

- Bruce Cockburn – producer
- Colin Linden – producer, additional recording
- John Whynot – recording and mixing
- Stephen Marcussen – mastering
- Ron Boustead – additional mastering
- Bill Sienkiewicz – illustration and album design
- Malcom Burn – photography

== Charts ==
Chart (1997)	Peak position
Canada Top Albums/CDs (RPM)	70
US Billboard 200	178

== Certifications ==
Certifications and sales for The Charity of Night
Region	Certification	Certified units/sales
Canada (Music Canada)	Gold	50,000^{^}
^{*} Sales figures based on certification alone.^{^} Shipments figures based on certification alone.
