= Joy Will Find a Way =

Studio album by Bruce Cockburn
- Released: 1975
- Recorded: July – August 1975
- Genres: Folk, pop
- Length: 43:39
- Label: True North
- Producer: Eugene Martynec

Bruce Cockburn chronology
Salt, Sun and Time (1974)	Joy Will Find a Way (1975)	In the Falling Dark (1976)

Singles from Joy Will Find a Way
- 1. "Burn" Released: 1975

Joy Will Find a Way is the sixth full-length album by Canadian singer/songwriter Bruce Cockburn. The album was released in 1975 by True North Records. It reached No. 34 on the Canadian RPM album chart and received a gold certification in Canada in 1985.

== Background ==
In an article published in The Music Scene on May 5, 1975, Bernie Finkelstein said that Cockburn was writing material for his next album at his farm outside of Ottawa. Finkelstein served as Cockburn's manager and the head of True North Records, which Cockburn was signed to. Cockburn commented that the album was "recorded in a pretty loose way" and that he spent one week rehearsing his material before going into the recording studio.

According to Cockburn, the guitar part on the title track was heavily derived from an Ethiopian thump harp composition. Cockburn's wife Kitty helped with the lyrics on the song "Starwheel". The album included contributions from several vocalists, including Beverly Glenn-Copeland.

== Release ==
Prior to the album's release, concerts were scheduled for Cockburn at the Winnipeg Folk Festival in July and the Stratford Festival on August 24 at the Festival Theatre. Cockburn's performance at the Festival Theatre consisted of a two-hour set to a sold-out crowd.

The September 6, 1975 edition of RPM reported that a new album from Cockburn was planned for release in late October. "Burn" was culled from the album as a single. The lacquer for Joy Will Find a Way was cut a JAMF, a subsidiary of the Nimbus 9 company owned by Jack Richardson.

To promote the album and its single "Burn", which received some airplay on soft rock radio stations in Canada, Cockburn embarked on a nationwide tour beginning in Sackville, New Brunswick on January 20, 1976 and concluding in Peterborough, Ontario on April 10. Within a few weeks, several of these performances were sold-out, including Cockburn's two performances at Massey Hall. In doing so, Cockburn became the first Canadian artist to play multiple sold-out shows at the venue since Gordon Lightfoot.

Cockburn's dates in British Columbia were arranged by a Vancouver based firm, which book performances at McPherson Playhouse and the Queen Elizabeth Theatre. He opted to select smaller venues so better gauge the audience's response to the material, saying "I can get that kind of feedback only from looking them in the eye."

== Critical reception ==
Professional ratings
Review scores
Source	Rating
AllMusic	2.5/5 stars

Peter Goddard of The Toronto Star called Joy Will Find a Way "a tranquil and affirmative collection of 10 songs that remind one of much of the work to be found on his past albums." He thought that the album was best heard in its entirety and concluded that it was "a solid example of how Bruce Cockburn has maintained his way. More importantly in conjunction with his past albums, it indicates that he will be around long after people are asking 'Elton who?' and are trying to remember all the fleeting fads in which this performer never played a part."

In a retrospective review, AllMusic critic Brett Hartenbach wrote, "Though it will appeal to the converted, Joy Will Find a Way, Bruce Cockburn's sixth album, won't do much to garner support outside of these circles. As always, Cockburn is never less than literate, and his guitar is consistently impressive throughout (check out the instrumental "Skylarking"), but there remains the tendency to become overwrought lyrically, as well as to get bogged down musically in the sort of folkish repetition that can be more tiresome than entrancing... Though he hadn't quite hit his stride at this point, this is the best of Bruce Cockburn's first half-dozen albums."

== Track listing ==
All songs written by Bruce Cockburn except "Starwheel", which was written with Kitty Cockburn.

No.	Title	Length
1.	"Hand-dancing"	4:30
2.	"January in the Halifax Airport Lounge"	3:19
3.	"Starwheel"	3:16
4.	"Lament for the Last Days"	5:24
5.	"Joy Will Find a Way (A Song About Dying)"	3:50
6.	"Burn"	4:08
7.	"Skylarking"	3:20
8.	"A Long-time-love Song"	4:41
9.	"A Life Story"	6:16
10.	"Arrows of Light"	4:55

== Album credits ==
Personnel

- Bruce Cockburn – composer, vocals, guitar, dulcimer
- Dennis Pendrith – bass
- Terry Clarke – drums
- Dido Morros – percussion
- Pat Godfrey – keyboards
- Eugene Martynec – guitar
- Beverly Glenn-Copeland – backing vocals
- Linda Page Harpa – backing vocals
- Malika Hollander – backing vocals
- Zezi Taeb – backing vocals
- Alexa De Wiel – backing vocals
- Jeffrey Crelingston – backing vocals

Production

- Mavel Mousette – translation
- Eugene Martynec – producer
- Blair Drawson – album cover paintings
- Harry Savage – album photography
- Bart Schoales – art direction
- Bernie Finkelstein – direction

== Chart performance ==
Chart (1976)	Peak position
Canada Top Albums (RPM)	34

== Certifications ==
Certifications and sales for Joy Will Find a Way
Region	Certification	Certified units/sales
Canada (Music Canada)	Gold	50,000^{^}
^{*} Sales figures based on certification alone.^{^} Shipments figures based on certification alone.
