= Stealing Fire (Bruce Cockburn album) =

Studio album by Bruce Cockburn
- Released: 1984
- Recorded: March–April, 1984
- Studios: Manta Sound, Toronto, Ontario
- Genres: Pop rock, folk rock
- Length: 41:56
- Labels: True North, Gold Mountain, A&M
- Producers: Jon Goldsmith, Kerry Crawford

Bruce Cockburn chronology
The Trouble with Normal (1983)	Stealing Fire (1984)	World of Wonders (1986)

Stealing Fire is the thirteenth studio album by the Canadian singer-songwriter Bruce Cockburn. It was released in 1984 by True North Records in Canada, with other labels handling its release internationally. It featured the hit singles "If I Had a Rocket Launcher", an angry political commentary on refugees under fire, and "Lovers in a Dangerous Time". John Naslen received a Juno Award for "Recording Engineer of the Year" for his work on this album, and producers Goldsmith and Crawford received a nomination for "Producer of the Year".

== Background and writing ==
After a trip to Central America on behalf of the Canadian arm of the charity Oxfam, Cockburn crafted an album featuring world-music influences and lyrics concerning life in Central America. He was moved by the plight of Guatemalan refugees in Mexico, and wrote the song "If I Had a Rocket Launcher", which reached a high of No. 88 on the Billboard Hot 100 charts with an associated music video regularly played on MTV. Despite the apparent threat of violence in the lyrics, Cockburn would later state, "this is not a call to arms; this is a cry." Other songs inspired by his Central America visit were "Nicaragua" and "Dust and Diesel" were inspired by his trip to Central America, with the former including an explicit rebuke of the US embassy in Managua and the latter being about the resilience of Nicaraguans.

Prior to his trip to Central America, where he was accompanied by the singer-songwriter Nancy White along with Rick Arnold, a Cuso International worker, Cockburn had not viewed himself as political, saying that he had "a pretty jaundiced view of anything with the word politics in it". He changed his opinion upon witnessing poverty in Central American refugee camps, which motivated him to become more politically conscious and incorporate these themes into his songwriting. Cockburn was particularly affected by the malnourishment he witnessed among the women and children in the refugee camps. He encountered minimal difficulties in writing lyrics, which he attributed to the intensity of the situations that he observed.

The single "Lovers in a Dangerous Time" contains the lyric "got to kick at the darkness till it bleeds daylight", which was picked up by U2's lead singer and lyricist Bono who would use it in the U2 song "God Part II" from their 1988 Rattle and Hum album. "Lovers in a Dangerous Time" and "If I Had a Rocket Launcher" were covered by the Canadian bands Barenaked Ladies and Cottage Industry, respectively, on the 1991 Cockburn tribute album Kick at the Darkness. The Barenaked Ladies cover was released as a single and charted in Canada.

"Yanqui Go Home" and "Call it the Sundance" were recorded during the Stealing Fire sessions but did not appear on the final track listing. They were included as bonus tracks on the 2003 remastered reissue by Rounder Records.

== Release ==
Stealing Fire was first released in Canada by True North Records in the end of May, with "Lovers in a Dangerous Time" being its first single. Within months of its release, Stealing Fire was certified gold in Canada. Two years later, the album received a platinum certification.

In the United States, Stealing Fire was released in the summer of 1984. The album's initial support came from college radio; by October, Stealing Fire was listed as a national breakout album by record shops reporting to Cashbox. Upon its rise up the charts, Stealing Fire saw its strongest sales in the midwest and western regions of the United States.

Cockburn embarked on a tour to promote the album, beginning with Eastern Canada and then crossing over to the western portion of the country. He assembled a backing band that included Miche Pouliot on drums, Chi Sharpe on percussion, Jon Goldsmith on keyboards, Fergus Marsh on bass, and Hugh Marsh on violin. Cockburn described this lineup as "more rhythmic" and "a more portable band" that was capable of being pared down to a smaller ensemble for locations that would be more challenging to accommodate for his backing band.

Cockburn's performance at the Ontario Place saw an attendance of 30,000 over the course of two evenings. According to RPM, the doors of the venue were closed at 7 p.m. to prevent additional people from getting into the building. He also played at the Greenbelt Festival in England on August 25, 1984. Cockburn was also slated to perform at "The Festival of Political Song" in Sokolov, Czech Republic, but was informed one day before the show that he would be removed from the bill; the provided reason was that his earring was "too subversive".

== Critical reception ==
Professional ratings
Review scores
Source	Rating
AllMusic	4.5/5 stars
The Village Voice	B

Greg Quill of the Toronto Star referred to Stealing Fire as "a sweaty, exotic epic". Quill thought "Maybe the Poet" was the only song on the album that carried significant similarities of Cockburn's earlier work, believing that much of the remaining material was both musically and lyrically influenced by Cockburn's trip to Central America, particularly citing "Nicaragua" and "Dust and Diesel" as examples. He characterized "If I Had a Rocket Launcher" as the album's "strangest and most unsettling piece", believing that its lyrics were a stark departure from what Cockburn had previously written.

Ottawa Citizen described the album as being underpinned by "soothing Third World rhythms" and "pleasant melodies". They believed that some aspects of the instrumentation and vocal delivery were not completely compatible with Cockburn's lyrics, saying that the dichotomy between these elements often compromised the lyrical content despite this contrast sometimes offering "intriguing" results. Robert Christgau of The Village Voice preferred the album's more political material over the "high-IQ lyricism" of Cockburn's more existential songs. He attributed this to his belief that the songs related to politics were more direct with their message.

James Muretich of the Calgary Herald gave the album a negative review, dismissing the album as being "engulfed by a musical monotony and predictability". He thought that "Peggy's Kitchen Wall" more effectively discussed the issue violence than his material related to Nicaragua, which he generally found to be "heavy-handed" and lacking in subtlety. Writing for The Oregonian, Rick Mitchell was more positive, praising it as "by far his most inspired effort". He believed that the lyrics were tastefully done and predicted that their political nature would result in some resistance from more conservative radio programmers. Marty Racine of The Houston Chronicle labeled the material as "deceptively complex" and "rich in texture", culminating in an album that was both "accessible and exotic".

In a retrospective review, AllMusic critic Brett Hartenbach wrote the album "passionately and eloquently details what [Cockburn] had seen while in Nicaragua and Guatemala... despite a few less than compelling tracks, is the work of an artist at his peak. It also contains some of the most intensely significant material by a singer/songwriter in the 1980s."

=== Recognition ===
Two songs on Stealing Fire, "Lovers in a Dangerous Time" and "Making Contact", received awards in the pop song category at the 1985 Performing Rights Organization of Canada Awards event. In 2018, the album won the Polaris Heritage Prize Jury Award in the 1976–1985 category.

== Track listing ==
All songs written by Bruce Cockburn except as noted.

No.	Title	Writer(s)	Length
1.	"Lovers in a Dangerous Time"		4:06
2.	"Maybe the Poet"	Bruce Cockburn, Jon Goldsmith, Fergus Marsh	4:51
3.	"Sahara Gold"		4:30
4.	"Making Contact"		4:47
5.	"Peggy's Kitchen Wall"		4:46
6.	"To Raise the Morning Star"	Cockburn, Marsh	5:51
7.	"Nicaragua"		4:44
8.	"If I Had a Rocket Launcher"		4:58
9.	"Dust and Diesel"		5:24

Remastered additional tracks
No.	Title	Length
10.	"Yanqui Go Home"	4:27
11.	"Call It The Sundance"	4:03

== Album credits ==
Personnel

- Bruce Cockburn – guitar and vocals
- Jon Goldsmith – keyboards, background vocals on "Maybe the Poet" and "Peggy's Kitchen Wall"
- Fergus Marsh – bass and Chapman Stick
- Miche Pouliot – drums
- Chi Sharpe – percussion
- Rick Shurman – ground effects on "Maybe the Poet"
- Vern Doerge, Jerry Johnson, Mike Malone, Rick Tait – horns on "Making Contact"
- Joel Feeney – background vocals on "Lovers in a Dangerous Time"
- Paul Henderson – background vocals on "Lovers in a Dangerous Time"
- Shawne Jackson – background vocals on "Maybe the Poet", "Making Contact", "Peggy's Kitchen Wall", "Morning Star"
- Carole Pope – background vocals on "Maybe the Poet", "Making Contact"
- Leroy Sibbles – background vocals on "Maybe the Poet", "Making Contact"
- Tim Ryan – background vocals on "Making Contact"
- Judy Cade – background vocals on "Peggy's Kitchen Wall"
- Kerry Crawford – background vocals on "Peggy's Kitchen Wall"
- Colina Phillips – background vocals on "Peggy's Kitchen Wall", "Morning Star"
- Sharon Lee Williams – background vocals on "Peggy's Kitchen Wall", "Morning Star"

Production

- Jon Goldsmith – producer
- Kerry Crawford – producer
- John Naslen – engineer
- Ron Searles – assistant engineer
- Peter J. Moore – digital remastering
- Blair Dawson – cover painting
- Bart Schoales – art direction
- George Whiteside – photography

== Chart performance ==
=== Weekly charts ===
Chart (1984–1985)	Peak position
Canada Top Albums/CDs (RPM)	12
US Billboard 200	74

=== Year-end charts ===
Chart (1984)	Position
Canada Top Albums (RPM)	49

== Certifications ==
Certifications and sales for Stealing Fire
Region	Certification	Certified units/sales
Canada (Music Canada)	Platinum	100,000^{^}
^{*} Sales figures based on certification alone.^{^} Shipments figures based on certification alone.
