= Small Source of Comfort =

Studio album by Bruce Cockburn
- Released: 2011
- Recorded: The Bathouse, Bath, Ontario, Pinhead Recorders, Nashville
- Genres: Folk, pop
- Length: 53:39
- Label: True North
- Producer: Colin Linden

Bruce Cockburn chronology
Life Short Call Now (2006)	Small Source of Comfort (2011)	Bone on Bone (2017)

Small Source of Comfort is the 24th studio album by Canadian singer/songwriter Bruce Cockburn, his first studio album in five years. It was released in 2011 by True North Records.

== Background ==
Cockburn said two of the songs on the album had been inspired by his travels and work. "Through the auspices of various organizations, I’ve been to troubled areas around the world," he told the PremierGuitar.com website. "I don’t feel like I’m doing the real work, but through my songs I can bring attention to these issues, hopefully helping to make the world a better place—or at least keep it from getting worse so fast. My travels don’t show up too much on this album, except on the song "Each One Lost" and the instrumental "Ancestors," which I wrote following a trip to Kandahar, Afghanistan under the auspices of the Canadian army. I witnessed a ceremony there honoring the sacrifices of two soldiers who had been killed and whose bodies were being flown back to Canada. I felt I had to give listeners an impression of what that felt like, so I went home and wrote "Each One Lost," the first half of which is in my perspective and the second half in that of a soldier. It was a very deep and emotional experience—one of the saddest things I’ve ever had the privilege to witness, and I wanted to let listeners know how it felt."

"Gifts," originally written in 1968 but never previously recorded. Cockburn explained: "When we did the first album, back at the end of the '60s I was singing that song in my shows. At the time, (manager) Bernie Finkelstein kept trying to get me to record the song, and I told him I was going to save it for the last album. After a while it just kind of disappeared. When we started to record this album I thought it’d be cool to bring back 'Gifts' but not tell Bernie. I also felt that at this point you never know ... I’m not getting any younger. So maybe there will be another album or maybe there won’t. It’s not a prediction of any kind. I just thought it was time to get it on record." He said Finkelstein was taken aback when he first heard the recording. "When the song started, he just took a double take right away," Cockburn said. "He turned to me after it was over, and he said, 'Is there anything I should know?' And I said no—it was just in case."

The album features two songs co-written with former Wailin' Jennys member Annabelle Chvostek. Cockburn said: "I haven’t done very much co-writing with people over the years. Annabelle called me up one day and asked if I’d like to try writing a song with her. I hadn’t written anything for a while and I thought, 'That might be good.' ... I knew she was good. And I thought maybe this was the catalyst to get my own creative juices flowing again. We wrote 'Driving Away' and then got together again and wrote 'Boundless'. We wrote them as duets because we were writing them as equals, so we decided that we would record them on that level and perform them on that level."

On another song, "Call Me Rose," he writes from the point of view of Richard Nixon, reincarnated as a single mother living in the projects. "I woke up one morning with this song in my head," Cockburn said, "and the opening line of the song is, 'My name was Richard Nixon, only now I'm a girl'." He said he had been angered by an earlier campaign by a member of the Bush administration to bring back the image of Richard Nixon. "There were all these pronouncements being made by various pundits in the press that he was the 'greatest President ever' and that he was misunderstood and all this baloney. And the interesting thing was nobody bought it. They kept doing this for a couple months and then all of a sudden it just disappeared; which suggested to me that somebody had paid to get this campaign going and once it hadn’t born fruit just cut it off. I was pleased to see that the American public was not taken in. Other than the fact that he made a very important gesture in terms of establishing communications with China—there’s no taking that away from him—he was a crook and a scumbag and no one should think otherwise. The fact that he was also an intelligent man doesn’t really mitigate the crookedness, or the carrying on of the war. The idea that you could bring him back as the 'greatest president ever' was absurd. So I suppose somewhere in there I might have been thinking, 'What would it take rehabilitate actual Richard Nixon?' Not just his image. So in the song he’s re-imagined as a single mom living in the projects. I guess it’s kind of like Groundhog Day."

"Comets of Kandahar", one of four instrumentals on the album, also had its origins in Afghanistan: "An instrumental piece isn’t really about anything, but you have to come up with names for these things. So the title came from something one of the Canadian soldiers said to me while we were standing there watching—what I learned was kind of a nightly pleasure for a lot of people on the base—the jet fighters taking off constantly, twenty-four hours a day, for missions or patrols. They go off in pairs, thirty seconds apart, and after dark you can’t see them; you just hear a roar. But a moment later you’ll see the flame, from the tail cone, coming out of the fighter. And that’s all you can see. There’s this glowing purplish cone flying across the sky. Everyone stops to look at this because it’s a beautiful sight. So there we are standing, a bunch of us, and we’re all looking at it, and the soldier standing next to me said, 'The comets of Kandahar.' So that became the title of the piece."

== Reception ==
Professional ratings
Review scores
Source	Rating
AllMusic	4/5 stars
Slant Magazine	3/5 stars

In a review for AllMusic, critic Thom Jurek wrote, "Cockburn's words have always held keen insight when pointed at the world, but these cut away the outside and look in the mirror first. There are some fine instrumentals here, too... Small Source of Comfort, which—for all its economy—is abundant in wisdom, empathy, and acceptance; further, it is illuminated beautifully in a deeply personal, even iconic, musical language." Joseph Jon Lanthier of Slant Magazine wrote, "With the meditative bemusement and ever-changing geographic backdrops of a pilgrim, Bruce Cockburn is arguably at his best when recollecting intense observations in tranquility... his humane snapshots are no less vivid now, but he seems unprecedentedly distant from their emotional heft." PremiereGuitar.com praised the album: "Cockburn's shimmering arpeggios, syncopated riffs, and hypnotic single-note lines blend elements of Mississippi John Hurt, Jerry Garcia, Leo Kottke, and Brazilian greats Luiz Bonfa and Oscar Castro-Neves, yet remain entirely his own."

Cockburn and Small Source of Comfort received two Canadian Folk Music Awards, for best contemporary album and best solo artist, at the 7th Canadian Folk Music Awards in 2011.

== Track listing ==
(All songs by Bruce Cockburn except where indicated)

1. "The Iris of the World" – 3:21
2. "Call Me Rose" – 3:16
3. "Bohemian 3-Step" – 4:07
4. "Radiance" – 4:11
5. "Five Fifty-One" – 3:14
6. "Driving Away" (Bruce Cockburn, Annabelle Chvostek) – 4:34
7. "Lois on the Autobahn" – 4:45
8. "Boundless" (Cockburn, Chvostek) – 4:45
9. "Called Me Back" – 2:41
10. "Comets of Kandahar" – 4:49
11. "Each One Lost" – 3:55
12. "Parnassus and Fog" – 3:25
13. "Ancestors" – 3:59
14. "Gifts" – 1:57

== Personnel ==
- Bruce Cockburn – vocals, guitars, Tibetan cymbals, chimes
- Jenny Scheinman – violins, harmonies
- John Dymond – bass, acoustic bass
- Gary Craig – drums, percussion
- Colin Linden – mandolins, hammertones, slide electric baritone guitars, harmonies
- Annabelle Chvostek – guitar, duet vocal ("Driving Away"), mandolin
- Celia Shacklett – harmonies
- Tim Laner – accordion

== Chart performance ==
Chart (2011)	Peak position
US Americana/Folk Albums (Billboard)	7
