= Humans (album) =

Studio album by Bruce Cockburn
- Released: September 29, 1980
- Recorded: July–August 1980
- Studio: Manta Sound
- Genres: Folk, pop
- Length: 43:20
- Labels: True North (Canada); Millennium (United States)
- Producer: Eugene Martynec

Bruce Cockburn chronology
Dancing in the Dragon's Jaws (1979)	Humans (1980)	Inner City Front (1981)

Singles from Humans
- 1. "Tokyo" Released: 1980; 2. "Rumours Of Glory" Released: 1980; 3. "I'm Okay (Fascist Architecture)" Released: 1980

Humans is the tenth full-length album by Canadian singer/songwriter Bruce Cockburn. The album was recorded at Manta Sound from July–August 1980 in Toronto, with Eugene Martynec serving as producer. It was released in September 1980 by True North Records in Canada and Millennium Records in the United States.

Cockburn wrote much of the material on Humans about the dissolution of his ten-year marriage and his travels. The album marked a further pivot away from folk music in favor of reggae and rock music. Humans peaked at No. 32 in Canada and No. 81 in the United States. Three singles were released from Humans, all of which reached the Canadian adult contemporary charts. "Tokyo" also peaked at No. 44 on the Canadian RPM Top Singles chart, with "Rumours of Glory" reaching the Billboard Bubbling Under chart.

== Background ==
Humans was released in the wake of "Wondering Where the Lions Are", Cockburn's first single to chart in the United States. When asked in a 1980 interview about his thoughts on following up "Wondering Where the Lions Are", Cockburn said that "I've got no objection to a large number of people hearing the records, but the songs have to be the way they are." He also mentioned that he included references to the works of some poets in subtle ways, elaborating that wanted to avoid messages that were "overstated".

During the writing of Humans, Cockburn was also meeting with Manfred Eicher of ECM Records about releasing a jazz project. Cockburn had traveled to Munich to discuss these plans, although these talks remained inconclusive. Cockburn had struggled to determine which of songs would be appropriate for the ECM album; he ultimately decided to prioritize Humans, which he believed was more likely to be completed. He also cited the difficulties in securing a deal with Warner Music Group to handle the worldwide distribution of the theoretical ECM record as another reason why that project was deprioritized. As such, Cockburn used all of his best material for Humans with the exception of "Hoop Dancer", which Cockburn described as a 20-minute hybrid between a song and a piece of poetry. He ultimately generated "an album and a half's worth of material" for Humans. One of those songs was "Tokyo", which was the first one that Cockburn recorded with a Fender Stratocaster.

Cockburn also opted to further integrate a full band on the album in part due to his disinterest in working solo. He also had developed an interest in incorporating elements of R&B and reggae into his music, which he felt was more conducive to a full-band approach. He used the rhythm section of Bob DisSalle and Dennis Pendrith, with several tracks also featuring the work of violinist Hugh Marsh, who Cockburn met while in Toronto.

== Composition ==
On Humans, Cockburn decided to center the album around his life experiences and perception of human nature. The songwriting for Humans was conducted in Paris, Milan, Tokyo, and Denver in addition to Canada. Cockburn had finished touring in Italy, Japan, and Canada, which he described as "very intense". He said that the album "deals with a lot of pain", while also acknowledging that there was a semblance of hope present within the material. Cockburn reflected on the material on Humans in an interview with High Fidelity magazine.

A lot of the songs on 'Humans' came out of my realization that I needed other people...when I was getting kicked around and battered, all these people were right there – they came through in a way I never would have expected.

"Tokyo" and "How I Spent My Fall Vacation" touched upon Cockburn's time touring internationally, which he said resulted in material that was "harder edged from a lyrical point of view". Cockburn cited "Tokyo" as one of his first songs to showcase an approach to songwriting that he compared to "a documentary-style thing, structured like a little movie". He added that this approach to songwriting would serve as a template for some of his later releases. "Fascist Architecture" was not written about fascism and instead relates to Cockburn's desire to reconnect with his wife, whom he had recently divorced. "You Get Bigger as You Go" and "What About the Bond" were also about Cockburn's separation with his wife, while "More Not More" was about the support he received from his friends.

"Grim Travellers" was written as a cynical look on human nature, where he expresses his view that humankind is incapable of suppressing its darkest inclinations. He characterized it as "a fairly hopeless song" that touches upon themes of violence, including terrorism. "Rumours of Glory" and "The Rose Above the Sky" were more ambiguous in their subject matter, with Cockburn saying that they were about "moving from downness into something that opens up". He made the decision to sequence "Rumours of Glory" directly after "Grim Travellers" to contrast the misanthropic outlook with more positive attributes found in human behavior, including the ability to love and depend on one another.

== Release ==
CBS Records International handled the distribution of Humans in Canada, which was released under the True North Records label. In the United States, RCA distributed the album with the Millennium Records logo. The release date for Humans was set for September 29, 1980. The liner notes included lyrics in both English and French.

In Canada, "Tokyo" had been released in February 1980 as the follow-up single to "Wondering Where the Lions Are". He had also performed the song during a 90 minute TV special filmed at CITY TV's studio; the performance aired on CITY-TV and CHUM-FM on March 1, 1980.

In the United States, "Rumours of Glory" was released as the album's first single. The single reached No. 4 on the US Billboard Bubbling Under Hot 100 chart, an extension of the publication's primary Hot 100 singles chart. Cashbox reviewed the single "Tokyo" in the December 13, 1980 edition of the publication, calling it "another folk/pop diamond" that "rails against dehumanizing industrialization". In 1981, "Tokyo" was one of the songs included on the album Superstars Salute New Massey Hall, which consisted of material from Canadian artists to raise money for Massey Hall.

=== Promotion ===
RCA and Millennium Records worked in tandem to launch a promotional campaign in that country. Millennium Records was tasked with budgeting and organizing the creation of a video segment that was made available to rock-oriented television stations. This segment included three songs from Humans, including "Rumours of Glory". RCA worked with Thirsty Ear Recordings to promote the album on roughly 300 college radio stations through a special segment on Cockburn that aired on October 20. Two-color ads were created for inclusion in all major music magazines beginning on October 4; time buys on radio stations were also arranged to launch within a month of the release of Humans. The primary slogan of the promotional campaign was "the secret is out".

Rather than immediately embark on a tour to promote Humans, Cockburn instead opted to conduct press interviews in Toronto. He had made this decision prior to the creation of Humans as he wanted additional time to recuperate after the conclusion of his world tour from the previous year. Reflecting on this decision, Cockburn said that "maybe it makes better business sense to tour", but that he instead wanted to direct his focus toward songwriting and guitar playing. A tour comprising roughly 15 major cities was nonetheless planned, with several of these shows having live broadcasts planned.

== Critical reception ==
Professional ratings
Review scores
Source	Rating
AllMusic	4.5/5 stars
The Rolling Stone Album Guide	3.5/5 stars
The Village Voice	B−

RPM called Humans Cockburn's "strongest vocal and musical delivery to date." They highlighted the song "Tokyo" for "driv[ing] the rest of the album forward" and also identified "Grim Travellers" as a strong track. Robert Christgau of The Village Voice thought that the lyrics on Humans were of inconsistent quality, saying that the parts combining "conversation and declamation" compensated for some of the album's weaker moments.

Billboard described Humans as "a lyrically vivid collage of real life drama unfolding in story and music." They were also complimentary of the album's musicianship and believed that the songs were "highly literate". Cashbox wrote that "Cockburn has stood alone with his deep introspective brand of music" and that his "themes are at the title implies, human." Record World was also complimentary of the musicianship, calling it "terrific" and labeled "Rumours of Glory" as "a potent single".

In a retrospective review of the Rounder reissue, AllMusic critic Thom Jurek wrote, "Long regarded as Bruce Cockburn's finest moment on record, Humans, issued in 1980, is easily the most revealing of his tomes as well... Humans is universal in its confusion and hard-won willingness to endure without seeking creature comforts or easy answers. Its musical and lyrical adventure would be a watermark for any artist; for Cockburn it became the first step to musical and poetic freedom. It sounds as harrowing, beautiful, and ethereal 20-plus years later as it did when it was first issued, and offers a uniquely universal message for seekers of personal, social, and spiritual truth. This is the one to start with. It is also the one to end with." Writing for Trouser Press, Brad Reno called it "a truly great album", adding that it "is a thoughtful, complex album, and is the best of Cockburn's career."

== Track listing ==
All tracks are written by Bruce Cockburn.

No.	Title	Length
1.	"Grim Travellers"	4:51
2.	"Rumours of Glory"	3:38
3.	"More Not More"	3:50
4.	"You Get Bigger as You Go"	4:35
5.	"What About the Bond"	4:55
6.	"How I Spent My Fall Vacation"	5:10
7.	"Guerrilla Betrayed"	3:56
8.	"Tokyo"	3:25
9.	"Fascist Architecture"	2:37
10.	"The Rose Above the Sky"	6:23

Remastered additional tracks
No.	Title	Length
11.	"Grim Travellers (live)"	5:59

== Personnel ==
- Bruce Cockburn – vocals, dulcimer, guitar
- Patricia Cullen – synthesizer
- Bob DiSalle – drums
- Ben Bow – drums
- Jon Goldsmith – keyboards
- Dennis Pendrith – bass
- Tony Hibbert – bass
- Bernie Pitters – keyboards
- Leroy Sibbles – backing vocals
- Rachel Paiement – backing vocals
- Murray McLauchlan – backing vocals
- Pat La Barbera – reeds
- Brian Leonard – percussion
- Hugh Marsh – violin

Production

- Gene Martynec – producer
- Gary Gray – engineer
- George Marino – mastering
- Roberto Masotti – photography
- Vladimir Meller – remastering
- Bart Schoales – art direction

== Charts ==
Chart (1980)	Peak position
Canada Top Albums/CDs (RPM)	32
US Billboard 200	81

== Certifications ==
Certifications and sales for Humans
Region	Certification	Certified units/sales
Canada (Music Canada)	Gold	50,000^{^}
^{*} Sales figures based on certification alone.^{^} Shipments figures based on certification alone.
