= Salt, Sun and Time =

Studio album by Bruce Cockburn
- Released: 1974
- Recorded: May – August 1974
- Genre: Folk rock
- Length: 36:12
- Label: True North
- Producers: Bruce Anthony, Gene Martynec

Bruce Cockburn chronology
Night Vision (1973)	Salt, Sun and Time (1974)	Joy Will Find a Way (1975)

Salt, Sun and Time is the fifth full-length album by Canadian singer-songwriter and guitarist Bruce Cockburn, released in late 1974 on True North Records. It peaked at No. 24 on the RPM Canadian albums chart.

== Background ==
The album was recorded in Toronto, Ontario at Thunder Sound studio between May and August 1974; except the songs "Salt, Sun and Time" and "Rouler Sa Bosse" which were mixed at Manta Sound with Leo DeCarlo. "Salt, Sun and Time" and "Rouler Sa Bosse" were included on Cockburn's 2005 instrumental album Speechless.

Some of the album's material, including "Don't Have to Tell You Why" and "Stained Glass", was previewed during a sold-out performance held at Massey Hall. Cockburn's producer, Gene Martynec, supplied additional guitar work during the second-half of the show.

Cockburn identified "All the Diamonds in the World" as his first "overtly Christian song", saying that "It was when I started calling myself a Christian. I'd become that, in everything but the commitment. And having made the commitment, it was necessary to use the term. This song commemorates that commitment. Because of the lyrical content, the musical style was self-consciously hymn-like." He mentioned in a 2010 interview that his ambivalence of being associated with some cultural and traditional facets of Christianity occasionally made him hesitant to perform the song.

== Reception ==
Professional ratings
Review scores
Source	Rating
AllMusic	3/5 stars

AllMusic critic James Chrispell wrote retrospectively, "There's a much more complex feel to what's here, especially the instrumental title track which shows a strong John Martyn influence. And while the songs are complex in texture and feel, they aren't hard to get into. In fact, this album grows on you the more you play it. Truly something that has endured."

== Track listing ==
All songs written by Bruce Cockburn except where noted.

1. "All the Diamonds in the World" – 2:42
2. "Salt, Sun and Time" – 3:10
3. "Don't Have to Tell You Why" – 4:33
4. "Stained Glass" – 3:14
5. "Rouler Sa Bosse" – 3:47
6. "Never So Free" – 4:01
7. "Seeds on the Wind" (Bruce Cockburn, Eugene Martynec) – 7:04
8. "It Won't Be Long" – 3:48
9. "Christmas Song" – 3:53

== Personnel ==
- Bruce Cockburn – guitar, composer, vocals
- Gene Martynec – synthesizer, guitar, producer
- Jack Zaza – clarinet

Production

- Bruce Anthony – producer
- Bill Seddon – engineer
- Vic Anesini – mastering
- Leo DeCarlo – mixing
- Lyle Wachovsky – photography
- Marcel Moussette – translation
- Bernie Finkelstein – direction

== Chart performance ==
Chart (1975)	Peak position
Canada Top Albums (RPM)	24
