= World of Wonders (album) =

Studio album by Bruce Cockburn
- Released: 1986
- Recorded: October–November 1985
- Genres: Folk, pop
- Length: 43:30
- Label: True North
- Producers: Jon Goldsmith, Kerry Crawford

Bruce Cockburn chronology
Stealing Fire (1984)	World of Wonders (1986)	Big Circumstance (1988)

World of Wonders is the fifteenth full-length album by Canadian singer-songwriter Bruce Cockburn. The album was released in 1986 by True North Records. It reached No. 7 on the Canadian RPM album chart, becoming his highest charting album in that country and his only album to reach the top ten. "People See Through" and "See How I Miss You" both charted on the Canadian singles chart, with the former becoming a top 40 hit.

== Background ==
Cockburn began work on World of Wonders in autumn 1985 following the conclusion of his tour promoting Stealing Fire. Gold Mountain Records, the label that Cockburn was signed to for some of his more recent studio releases in the United States, and changed distributers from A&M Records to MCA Records.

Similar to some of his other albums released in the 1980s, Cockburn continued to incorporate commentary on global politics on World of Wonders, with much of his viewpoints being informed by his 1983 trip sponsored by OXFAM to Central America, where he witnessed poverty and strife within the region. He included elements of African and Latin music, which was influenced by his listening habits. The album features the charango, an instrument originating from the Andes that Cockburn acquired during his travels. Commenting on the album's stylistic choices, Cockburn acknowledged that the music has a "consciously internationalist sound" and that he preferred to present the material with a band with the intention of making it more danceable and accessible to listeners.

"Call it Democracy" relates to economic exploitation endured by developing countries and perpetrated by the United States and the International Monetary Fund. For the initial United States pressings of the album, the lyrics "You don't really give a flying fuck," and "IMF, dirty MF" were highlighted in bright yellow in the liner notes at the insistence of the Parents Music Resource Center. The label eliminated the yellow highlighting for later editions of the album. A music video for "Call it Democracy" was produced, which was directed by Ron Berti and produced by Total Eclipse Productions. The song's profanities were censored when played on radio stations and video channels.

"Lily of the Midnight Sky" features some spoken word passages from Cockburn. He wrote the song "People See Through You" as a rebuke of the Ronald Reagan administration, particularly for his approval of the FBI conducting raids on the Sanctuary movement. Cockburn wrote "Down Here Tonight" around his belief that worldly problems are likely to resolve themselves through the influence of a spiritual force, explaining that "I don't mean that if we ignore all the world's problems, they’ll go away. But we have to keep in mind that some¬ thing larger than ourselves is at work here."

== Critical reception ==
Professional ratings
Review scores
Source	Rating
AllMusic	3/5 stars
The Village Voice	B

Billboard wrote that Cockburn "continues his potent growth as an electric stylist" on World of Wonders. They labeled "Call it Democracy" as a "standout" on the album and predicted that radio stations would be hesitant to play the song. Kent Zimmerman of the Gavin Report thought that most of the material on World of Wonders was "a beautifully recorded piece of work." He concluded his review by saying that "the best part of World Of Wonders is its underlying subversive nature".

Robert Christgau of The Village Voice expressed his opinion that the melodic and lyrical ideas elevated the appeal of the album's first side and believed that elsewhere, the "oppressive boom-boom of four-four drums" would leave more of an impact on listeners than any of the socio-political commentary or world-music influences on World of Wonders. He also found Cockburn's commentary on imperialism to be "as tough and articulate as any white person with a record deal."

In a retrospective review, AllMusic critic Brett Hartenbach wrote, "World of Wonders takes you across the globe, through Berlin, Chile, parts of the Caribbean, and North America. Along the way, Cockburn, who has always been intrigued by life's contradictions, is both "dazzled... at this world of wonders" and troubled, "...when life isn't so sweet." Bruce Cockburn is a complex artist writing about complex times, and World of Wonders does a good job of capturing that."

== Track listing ==
All songs written by Bruce Cockburn.

No.	Title	Length
1.	"Call it Democracy"	3:50
2.	"Lily of the Midnight Sky"	4:44
3.	"World of Wonders"	4:45
4.	"Berlin Tonight"	7:05
5.	"People See Through You"	3:44
6.	"See How I Miss You"	4:01
7.	"Santiago Dawn"	4:47
8.	"Dancing in Paradise"	5:40
9.	"Down Here Tonight"	3:54

== Personnel ==
- Bruce Cockburn – vocals, electric and acoustic guitars, and charango
- Fergus Jemison Marsh – bass, Chapman stick
- Hugh Marsh – violin
- Jon Goldsmith – keyboards
- Chi Sharpe – percussion
- Michael Sloski – drums
- Michael Alan White – trumpet, flugelhorn, and conch
- Sharon Lee Williams – backing vocals
- Shawne Jackson – backing vocals
- Colina Philips – backing vocals
- Kerry Crawford – backing vocals
- Judy Cade – backing vocals

Production

- Marcel Mousette – translation
- Jon Goldsmith, Kerry Crawford – producer
- George Whiteside – photography
- Bart Schoales – art direction
- Bernie Finkelstein – direction

== Chart performance ==
=== Weekly charts ===
Chart (1986)	Peak position
Canada Top Albums/CDs (RPM)	7
German Albums (Offizielle Top 100)	48
US Billboard 200	143

=== Year-end charts ===
Chart (1986)	Position
Canada Top Albums (RPM)	45

== Certifications ==
Certifications and sales for Humans
Region	Certification	Certified units/sales
Canada (Music Canada)	Gold	50,000^{^}
^{*} Sales figures based on certification alone.^{^} Shipments figures based on certification alone.
