= Life Short Call Now =

Studio album by Bruce Cockburn
- Released: 2006
- Recorded: February 2006
- Studios: National Treasures, Schomberg, Ontario
- Genres: Folk, pop
- Length: 58:52
- Label: True North
- Producer: Jonathan Goldsmith

Bruce Cockburn chronology
Speechless (2005)	Life Short Call Now (2006)	Small Source of Comfort (2011)

Life Short Call Now is the 23rd studio album by Canadian singer/songwriter Bruce Cockburn. It was released in 2006 by True North Records. The album featured a 27-piece string section and guest appearances by Ron Sexsmith, Ani Difranco and Hawksley Workman on backing vocals.

"This is Baghdad" was inspired by a trip that Cockburn took to Iraq with a group of Americans led by Thomas Gumbleton. Cockburn said it was "an attempt to describe the scene as I saw it, which I've done in many other songs about many other places." "Slow Down Fast" was written as a piece of social commentary that observes topical events in a similar vein to his songs "Call It Democracy" and "Trickle Down".

== Reception ==
Professional ratings
Review scores
Source	Rating
AllMusic	4/5 stars
Entertainment Weekly	B
MSN Music (Consumer Guide)	(choice cut)
PopMatters	7/10 stars

In a review for AllMusic, critic Thom Jurek wrote, "Those who have followed his career over the past four decades wondered where he would go next, or indeed if there was anywhere he could go. The question has been answered in spades on Life Short Call Now... Life Short Call Now is absent of metonymy or metaphor; it reports from the inside what is, and what should never be with balance, as well as yearning for convergence."

Michael Keefe of PopMatters wrote Cockburn "continues to grow as an artist and to remain relevant as an observer of this rickety old world in which we live." and summarized there are "several standout songs on Life Short, but a few lackluster tracks keep the album just beyond the reach of the upper echelon of Bruce Cockburn releases." Writing for Entertainment Weekly, Beth Johnson called Life Short Call Now a "choppy, though often gorgeously scenic ride" that was "split between pro-love and antiwar songs".

== Track listing ==
All songs written by Bruce Cockburn, except "Tell the Universe", which was written with Julie Wold, Ben Riley, and Steve Lucas.

No.	Title	Length
1.	"Life Short Call Now"	5:32
2.	"See You Tomorrow"	4:20
3.	"Mystery"	5:50
4.	"Beautiful Creatures"	5:09
5.	"Peace March"	3:32
6.	"Slow Down Fast"	3:39
7.	"Tell the Universe"	5:14
8.	"This Is Baghdad"	6:21
9.	"Jerusalem Poker"	5:33
10.	"Different When It Comes to You"	2:50
11.	"To Fit in My Heart"	6:06
12.	"Nude Descending a Staircase"	4:23

== Personnel ==
- Bruce Cockburn – vocals, guitars
- Gary Craig – drums, percussion
- David Piltch – acoustic and electric bass
- Julie Wolf – piano, harmonium, wurlitzer, Fender Rhodes, B3, accordion, melodica
- Jonathan Goldsmith – celesta, glockenspiel, maikotron, piano ("Mystery"), Fender Rhodes ("Nude Descending a Staircase")
- Kevin Turcotte – flugelhorn, trumpet
- Ron Sexsmith – background vocals ("Mystery")
- Hawksley Workman – background vocals ("Mystery", "Slow Down Fast")
- Damhnait Doyle – background vocals ("Mystery", "Life Short Call Now", "Different When It Comes to You")
- Ani Difranco – background vocals ("See You Tomorrow")
- Julie Wolf – background vocals ("Tell the Universe", "To Fit in My Heart")

=== Orchestra ===
- Violas: Parmela Attariwala, Virginia Barron, Caroline Blackwell, Johnthan Craig, Steve Dann, Kathleen Kajioka, Jeewon Kim, Gary Labovitz, Teng Li, Nick Papadakis, Douglas Perry, Anna Redekop, Christopher Redfield, Angela Rudden, Beverly Spotton, Scott St. John, Josef Tamir, David Willms
- Cellos: Maurizio Baccante, Roman Borys, Matt Brubeck, David Hetherington, John Marshman, Paul Widner, Winona Zelenka
- Basses: Roberto Occhipinti, Charles Elliot

=== Technical ===
- Dan Parr – score (preparation)
- Jeff McMurrich – string recording engineer
- Dennis Patterson – assistant string recording engineer
- Pete Lawlor – assistant string recording engineer
