= Dart to the Heart =

Studio album by Bruce Cockburn
- Released: March 1, 1994
- Studio: Bearsville
- Genre: Folk rock
- Label: Columbia
- Producer: T Bone Burnett

Bruce Cockburn chronology
Christmas (1993)	Dart to the Heart (1994)	The Charity of Night (1997)

Dart to the Heart is an album by the Canadian musician Bruce Cockburn, released in 1994. Cockburn considered it to be primarily an album of love songs.

The album peaked at No. 27 on the RPM album chart and No. 176 on the Billboard 200. Three singles charted in Canada; the first, "Listen for the Laugh", received airplay on AAA radio. Cockburn supported the album by touring with Patty Larkin. It also received some airplay on album oriented rock radio stations in the United States, where it reached No. 53 on the AOR chart published by Radio & Records.

== Production ==
Dart to the Heart was produced by T Bone Burnett and mixed by Glyn Johns. Burnett had produced Cockburn's album Nothing but a Burning Light, and was asked by Cockburn to work with him again over his belief that "there was ground left to over that we hadn't covered when we finished Nothing but a Burning Light."

Similar to his album Nothing but a Burning Light, Cockburn decided to forgo the jazz influences that been present on some of his previous releases in favor of a rootsier rock and roll feel. The album was recorded at Bearsville Studios, in New York, although it was Cockburn's original intention to record the "quieter" songs in Los Angeles with a different group of musicians. Burnett selected several of the session musicians for Dart to the Heart, which included Mickey Curry on drums, Jerry Scheff on bass, and Greg Leisz on pedal steel guitar. These musicians were augmented by members of Cockburn's touring band.

"Closer to the Light" is a tribute to the American musician Mark Heard, who died in 1992. "Train in the Rain" is an instrumental. "Scanning These Crowds" is about Louis Riel and the Red River Rebellion.

== Critical reception ==
Professional ratings
Review scores
Source	Rating
AllMusic	3/5 stars
Calgary Herald	B+
The Encyclopedia of Popular Music	3/5 stars
Entertainment Weekly	B-
The Indianapolis Star	4/4 stars
Los Angeles Times	3/4 stars
MusicHound Rock: The Essential Album Guide	3/5 stars
Orlando Sentinel	4/5 stars
USA Today	3/4 stars
Windsor Star	A

RPM wrote that "the songs on Dart To The Heart reflect an ease and comfortability with the songwriting craft that few artists possess". They identified influences of blues on the album and highlighted the guitar playing of Colin Linden throughout.

Entertainment Weekly wrote that the album "veers from boisterous to a little too sleepy, and includes some beautifully pithy lyrics." The Washington Post called the album Cockburn's best since World of Wonders, writing that it "is dominated by quiet love songs built around acoustic guitar and a refreshingly original take on pop music's most familiar subject." The Los Angeles Times considered it "tenderly hopeful in heart and slightly feisty in folk-rock spirit."

The Milwaukee Sentinel thought that "Cockburn has the intelligent folk rocker's respect for words and almost never writes a throwaway." The Indianapolis Star noted that "Listen for the Laugh" "has a Lou Reed-esque driving beat with edgy, flat vocals." The New York Times determined that the album's best songs "describe a domestic relationship as a precious, all-too-extingishable light in a dark, lonely world." The Calgary Herald concluded that Cockburn "looks within but not without sharpening his sense of observation, his sense of searching for meaning in the presence, the passion of another."

AllMusic called the album "a convincing reminder of a gentler, more reflective Bruce Cockburn." Salon deemed it a "great lyrical" album.

== Track listing ==
All tracks are written by Bruce Cockburn.

No.	Title	Length
1.	"Listen for the Laugh"	4:07
2.	"All the Ways I Want You"	4:21
3.	"Bone in My Ear"	3:47
4.	"Burden of the Angel/Beast"	6:31
5.	"Scanning These Crowds"	3:51
6.	"Southland of the Heart"	4:50
7.	"Train in the Rain"	3:44
8.	"Someone I Used to Love"	3:35
9.	"Love Loves You Too"	4:14
10.	"Sunrise on the Mississippi"	3:01
11.	"Closer to the Light"	4:11
12.	"Tie Me at the Crossroads"	2:50

== Personnel ==
- Bruce Cockburn – guitars, charango, vocals
- Colin Linden – guitars (tracks 1–2, 4–5, 9, 11–12), vocals (tracks 2, 4, 11–12), mandolin (tracks 3, 8)
- Greg Leisz – pedal steel guitar (tracks 3, 5–6, 8)
- Richard Bell – organ (tracks 1–2, 5, 9, 11–12), accordion (tracks 3, 8), Wurlitzer electronic piano (track 4), vocals (track 12)
- Benmont Tench – organ (track 6)
- Jerry Scheff – bass (tracks 1–6, 8–9, 11–12), vocals (track 12)
- Mickey Curry – drums (tracks 1–2, 5, 8–9, 12), vocals (track 12)
- T Bone Burnett – drums (track 3), organ (track 8), vocals (track 12)
- Christopher Parker – drums (tracks 3–4, 11), percussion (track 5)
- Denny Fongheiser – drums (track 6)
- Darrell Leonard – trumpet, horn arrangement (tracks 1, 5)
- Christian Mostert – tenor saxophone (tracks 1, 5–6)
- Greg Smith – baritone saxophone (tracks 1, 5–6)
- Sam Phillips – vocals (track 9)
- Stephen Bruton – vocals (track 12)
- Chris Laidlaw – vocals (track 12)

== Charts ==
Chart (1994)	Peak position
Canada Top Albums (RPM)	27
US Billboard 200	176
