= Night Vision (Bruce Cockburn album) =

Album by Bruce Cockburn

Studio album by Bruce Cockburn
- Released: October 1973
- Recorded: January–May 1973
- Studios: Thunder, Toronto
- Genre: Folk
- Length: 40:39
- Label: True North
- Producer: Eugene Martynec

Bruce Cockburn chronology
Sunwheel Dance (1972)	Night Vision (1973)	Salt, Sun and Time (1974)

Singles from Night Vision
- 1. "Mama Just Wants to Barrelhouse All Night Long" Released: January 1974

Night Vision is the fourth studio album by Canadian singer-songwriter Bruce Cockburn released domestically on True North Records. The album earned Cockburn's first Canadian gold record award in 1979. It was the first full album that Cockburn recorded with a band. The album saw Cockburn incorporate elements of jazz guitar into his music. It was also Cockburn's first album to be certified Gold in Canada.

== Background ==
Cockburn recorded Night Vision from January – May 1973 at Toronto Thunder Sound. On several songs, Cockburn was backed by Pat Godfrey on piano, Dennis Pendrith on bass, and John Savage, who had all also worked on David Wiffen's 1973 solo album, Coast to Coast Fever, which Cockburn produced. Cockburn said that Night Vision served as "the night side of Sunwheel Dance", which was his previous solo album. He expressed his belief that the material on Night Vision was "not all pessimistic by any means...but the imagery is more urban than on past albums". Night Vision showcases influences of several genres, including blues on "Mama Just Wants to Barrelhouse All Night Long" and "The Blues Got the World", and jazz on "Islands In a Black Sky".

The album's artwork is an adaptation of a 1954 painting by Alex Colville entitled Horse and Train. The cover folds out to form one complete picture, which shows a horse on railroad tracks facing a train with beaming headlights.

In Canada, Night Vision was released by True North Records in Canada and distributed by Columbia Records a few days prior to his October 19, 1973 performance at Massey Hall in Toronto. Whereas CBS Records International had handled the distribution of Cockburn's first and third albums outside of Canada, they opted against this for Night Vision. This disappointed Cockburn, who believed that it was "the most commercial thing I'd done to date." In March 1974, Columbia Records reached an agreement to release Night Vision in the United Kingdom.

== Reception ==
Professional ratings
Review scores
Source	Rating
AllMusic	3.5/5 stars

AllMusic music critic James Chrispell wrote retrospectively, "A little darker this time out (hence the title), Bruce Cockburn's fourth album finds even greater rewards... No matter what type of music you're looking for, there's something here that will tickle your fancy."

== Track listing ==
All songs by Bruce Cockburn

1. "Foxglove" – 1:29
2. "You Don't Have to Play the Horses" – 3:49
3. "The Blues Got the World..." – 1:52
4. "Mama Just Wants to Barrelhouse All Night Long" – 4:14
5. "Islands in a Black Sky" – 7:40
6. "Clocks Don't Bring Tomorrow – Knives Don't Bring Good News" – 6:49
7. "When the Sun Goes Nova" – 2:42
8. "Déjà Vu" – 5:36
9. "Light Storm" – 2:33
10. "God Bless the Children" – 4:17

== Personnel ==
- Bruce Cockburn – vocals, guitar
- Pat Godfrey – piano
- Dennis Pendrith – bass
- John Savage – drums

== Chart performance ==
=== Weekly charts ===
Chart (1974)	Peak position
Canada Top Albums (RPM)	14

=== Year-end charts ===
Chart (1974)	Position
Canada Top Albums (RPM)	92

== Certifications ==
Certifications and sales for Night Vision
Region	Certification	Certified units/sales
Canada (Music Canada)	Gold	50,000^{^}
^{*} Sales figures based on certification alone.^{^} Shipments figures based on certification alone.
