= Sunwheel Dance =

Studio album by Bruce Cockburn
- Released: 1972
- Recorded: September to December 1971
- Studio: Thunder Sound
- Genre: Folk
- Length: 34:24
- Labels: True North, Rounder
- Producer: Eugene Martynec

Bruce Cockburn chronology
High Winds, White Sky (1971)	Sunwheel Dance (1972)	Night Vision (1973)

Singles from Sunwheel Dance
- 1. "It's Going Down Slow" Released: 1972; 2. "Up On the Hillside" Released: 1972

Sunwheel Dance is the third studio album by the Canadian singer-songwriter Bruce Cockburn. It was released in April 1972 by True North Records and reached the top 20 of the RPM Canadian albums chart, his first to do so. It also spawned two singles that made the Canadian adult contemporary chart. The album has sold steadily through the years, receiving a Canadian gold record award in 1988. The album was remastered and released by Rounder Records in 2005 with two bonus tracks.

== Background ==
For the most part, Cockburn's lyrics here continue to be primarily introspective and spiritual, bolstered by sparse acoustic arrangements. Cockburn made his first foray into political commentary on the anti-war diatribe "Going Down Slow," which also marks the artist's first utilization of a full band on record. The title track was the first instrumental composition that Cockburn recorded. When developing the title track, Cockburn took some inspiration from the musician Fox Watson, who had taken fiddle compositions and rearranged them for the guitar. He described Watson's reworkings as having "these beautiful melodies, with a really nice harmonic approach to them. I absorbed a fair amount from that."

When the album was still on the charts, Cockburn participated in the Maple Music Junket Concerts. The event spanned multiple days and venues, with Cockburn performing at the second concert held at Massey Hall in Toronto on June 6, 1972. The event, which was financed by entities including the Canadian Recording Manufacturer's Association and the Composers, Authors and Publishers Association of Canada was labeled by RPM as "the largest gathering of European press people to ever take place on Canadian soil", having been organized with the intention of showcasing Canadian talent to Europeans.

Cockburn also played at the Mariposa Folk Festival that year, which attracted 14,000 attendees on the final day of the event. During his Sunday performance, Cockburn opted to forgo some of his set to give Neil Young the opportunity to play.

== Critical reception ==
Professional ratings
Review scores
Source	Rating
AllMusic	2/5 stars

In a contemporary review of Sunwheel Dance, RPM referred to the album as "flawless". AllMusic music critic James Chrispell wrote retrospectively, "Cockburn has begun to show that he couldn't be categorized, and while that made listening to his music so enjoyable, he had a hard time at the retail level. But if you're willing to take a little time and listen with an open ear, you'll find much here to celebrate."

== Track listing ==
All tracks are written by Bruce Cockburn.

No.	Title	Length
1.	"My Lady and My Lord"	2:15
2.	"Feet Fall on the Road"	2:41
3.	"Fall"	2:58
4.	"Sunwheel Dance"	1:42
5.	"Up On the Hillside"	3:00
6.	"Life Will Open"	4:06
7.	"It's Going Down Slow"	3:35
8.	"When the Sun Falls"	2:21
9.	"He Came from the Mountain"	3:12
10.	"Dialogue with the Devil (or Why Don't We Celebrate)"	6:20
11.	"For the Birds"	2:14

Remastered additional tracks
No.	Title	Length
12.	"Morning Hymn"	2:39
13.	"My Lady and My Lord (Solo Version)"	2:19

== Personnel ==
Musicians

- Bruce Cockburn – acoustic guitar, electric guitar, dulcimer, mandolin, piano, slide guitar
- Eugene Martynec – piano and electric guitar
- Dennis Pendrith – bass guitar
- John Savage – drums
- Trisha Cullen – accordion
- Ian Guenther – violin
- Carol Marshall – cello
- Eric Nagler – jaw harp
- Michael Ferry, Anne and Mose Scarlett, Eric and Marty Nagler – chorus on "For the Birds"

Production

- Eugene Martynec – producer
- Bill Seddon – engineer at Thunder Sound Studios

== Chart performance ==
Chart (1972)	Peak position
Canada Top Albums (RPM)	19

== Certifications ==
Certifications and sales for Sunwheel Dance
Region	Certification	Certified units/sales
Canada (Music Canada)	Gold	50,000^{^}
^{*} Sales figures based on certification alone.^{^} Shipments figures based on certification alone.
