= Dancing in the Dragon's Jaws =

Studio album by Bruce Cockburn
- Released: 1979
- Recorded: May–June 1979
- Genre: Folk rock
- Length: 36:37
- Label: True North
- Producer: Gene Martynec

Bruce Cockburn chronology
Further Adventures Of (1978)	Dancing in the Dragon's Jaws (1979)	Humans (1980)

Singles from Dancing in the Dragon's Jaws
- 1. "Wondering Where the Lions Are" Released: February 1980

Dancing in the Dragon's Jaws is the ninth studio album by Canadian singer-songwriter Bruce Cockburn, released in 1979. It was released in 1979 and reached No. 22 on the Canadian albums chart. It also peaked at No. 45 on the US Billboard 200, his highest charting album in that country. "Wondering Where the Lions Are" was released as the album's first single and reached the top 40 on the Canadian Top Singles chart and the US Billboard Hot 100, becoming Cockburn's only song to achieve this in the United States.

By 1981, Dancing in the Dragon's Jaws had sold a few hundred thousand copies in the United States and had received a Gold certification in Canada for sales exceeding 50,000 units. The following year, Dancing in the Dragon's Jaws was certified Platinum in Canada, denoting over 100,000 units shipped.

== Background ==
Similar to Cockburn's previous two studio releases, Dancing in the Dragon's Jaws was primarily an acoustic album centered around Cockburn's acoustic guitar playing. Cockburn said that the album was about "being joyful in the face of everything." The album cover is a painting by Canadian aboriginal artist Norval Morrisseau, an Ojibwe artist who based the design on traditional rock drawings and birchbark scrolls.

Up to that time, Cockburn's records had been influenced by his Christianity; Third Way magazine wrote in 1987 that "in 1979 the simple Christian faith [Cockburn] had been celebrating was transformed with the release of his most popular ever album Dancing in the Dragon's Jaws, where, with the help of Charles Williams, his pre-Christian mysticism resurfaced after the baptism of faith as mature Christian mysticism." In a 1987 interview with Musician magazine, Cockburn said that Dancing In The Dragon’s Jaws "was the peak of what I had to say about the spiritual side of things".

== Release ==
Dancing in the Dragon's Jaws was released in Canada by True North Records in 1979. On November 19 of that year, Cockburn performed live on a CBS special that was broadcast nationally across the United States. He then embarked on a tour across Italy spanning 12 days that concluded on December 4 in Rome. The tour was arranged by Dischi Ricordi, who licensed Truth North products in Italy. According to RPM magazine, the tour generated a favorable response among the public and music industry.

Around the time that Cockburn was touring in Italy, Millennium Records developed an interest and Cockburn and announced that Dancing in the Dragon's Jaws would be issued in the United States in January 1980. Billboard commented that Millennium Records was "not only considered to be a venerable institution in Canada, but also a viable label that allows its artists more latitude than many others would dare offer."

Millennium Records released Dancing in the Dragon's Jaws in the United States on January 12, 1980, which was accompanied by the single "Wondering Where the Lions Are". They promoted the album with 5,000 teaser postcards distributed to press, radio, colleges and retailers and a oversized photo of Cockburn with the phrase "Canada's Best Kept Secret". Following the success of "Wondering Where the Lions Are" in the United States, Millennium Records changed their ads to says that "the secret is out". Indianapolis hosted a Dancing in the Dragon's Jaws kite contest in which participants were eligible to win six Chinese kites.

In 1980, Billboard announced that CBS would be creating a premium quality version of Dancing in the Dragon's Jaws for audiophiles using half-speed cutting procedures. This version was only made available in Canada as Cockburn was instead signed to Millennium Records in the United States. In 2002, a remastered edition was released by Rounder Records with two extra tracks, "Dawn Music" and "Bye Bye Idi". Both of these songs are instrumentals, with "Bye Bye Idi" referencing the overthrow of Idi Amin, a former president of Uganda.

== Critical reception ==
Professional ratings
Review scores
Source	Rating
AllMusic	4/5 stars
The Rolling Stone Album Guide	3.5/5 stars

In their review of the album, Cashbox predicted that Dancing in the Dragon's attain commercial success in them United States, adding that "Cockburn is a genius at weaving dense, moody patterns with his unwavering guitar expertise and a voice as strong and solid as Canadian timber." Record World wrote that Dancing in the Dragon's Jaws "features some of the loviest imagery around". Billboard thought that the musicianship on the album was "top-notch" with "a cool brand of folk-rock that often has jazz tinges". They also praised the lyrics as "assiduously crafted" and identified "Creation Dream", "No Footprints", "Badlands", and "Northern Star" as the best songs on the album.

Music critic Brett Hartenbach, writing retrospectively for AllMusic, stated: "The album continues the jazz-inflected folk he had been pursuing on his past several releases, but with a heavier emphasis on the worldbeat rhythms that would play a larger part in his music in the years to come... though it can't match the sheer power of his next few releases, [it] may be his most beautiful record, as well as an excellent culmination of his '70s work."

== Track listing ==
All tracks are written by Bruce Cockburn.

No.	Title	Length
1.	"Creation Dream"	4:00
2.	"Hills of Morning"	4:25
3.	"Badlands Flashback"	6:12
4.	"Northern Lights"	4:06
5.	"After the Rain"	3:59
6.	"Wondering Where the Lions Are"	3:42
7.	"Incandescent Blue"	4:35
8.	"No Footprints"	5:38

Remastered additional tracks
No.	Title	Length
9.	"Dawn Music"	4:28
10.	"Bye Bye Idi"	3:41

== Personnel ==
- Bruce Cockburn – guitar, chimes, synthesizer, dulcimer, vocals
- Pat Godfrey – piano, marimba, background vocal on "Wondering Where the Lions Are"
- Robert Boucher – bass
- Bob Di Salle – drums, congas except on "Wondering Where the Lions Are"
- Larry "Sticky Fingers" Silvera – bass, background vocal
- Ben Bow – drums, güiro, background vocal

== Charts ==
Chart (1979–1980)	Peak position
Canada Top Albums (RPM)	22
US Billboard 200	45

== Certifications ==
Certifications and sales for Dancing in the Dragon's Jaws
Region	Certification	Certified units/sales
Canada (Music Canada)	Platinum	100,000^{^}
^{*} Sales figures based on certification alone.^{^} Shipments figures based on certification alone.
