= Wondering Where the Lions Are =

1980 single by Bruce Cockburn

Single by Bruce Cockburn

from the album Dancing in the Dragon's Jaws
- B-side: "After the Rain"
- Released: February 1980
- Recorded: 1979
- Length: 3:42
- Label: True North
- Songwriter: Bruce Cockburn
- Producer: Gene Martynec

Bruce Cockburn singles chronology
"Laughter" (1978)	"Wondering Where the Lions Are" (1980)	"Tokyo" (1980)

"Wondering Where the Lions Are" is a song written and performed by the Canadian singer-songwriter Bruce Cockburn. The track is from his 1979 album Dancing in the Dragon's Jaws and was released as a single. It became Cockburn's first song to reach the US Billboard Hot 100, where it peaked at No. 21. In Cockburn's native country of Canada, the song reached No. 39 on the RPM Top Singles chart, which at the time was his best performing song on that listing.

== Development and composition ==
The song was indirectly inspired by a dinner meeting between Cockburn and a relative that worked in a defence-related government position. The relative suggested that there was considerable concern that a war might break out between China and the Soviet Union saying, "We could wake up tomorrow to a nuclear war". Cockburn was upset, and had dreams that night about lions at his front door, but not in a threatening way. When he awoke the next morning to find war had not broken out, he began using elements of the dream to compose the song.

== Critical reception ==
Cashbox called the song "ultimately infectious" and said that it "wraps a series of lyrically inviting yet slightly mysterious images about a bouncy, acoustic guitar-dominated rhythm". Record World wrote that "the dancing acoustic guitar & Cockburn's vocal phasing equal a delightful multi-format hit."

== Chart performance ==
"Wondering Where the Lions Are" was Cockburn's only Top 40 hit in the United States, peaking at No. 21 on the Billboard Hot 100, and it peaked at No. 92 in Australia.

While also a Top-40 hit in Cockburn's native Canada, it was not his biggest hit in that country, where seven of his subsequent singles reached higher chart positions. It was named the 29th greatest Canadian song of all time in the 2005 CBC Radio series 50 Tracks: The Canadian Version. Cockburn said that the commercial success of "Wondering Where the Lions Are" was "a big surprise" that was "both very welcome and very fraught", adding that it granted him more attention in America and granted him further touring opportunities.

Cockburn performed the song on the American television show Saturday Night Live, Season 5, Episode 18, with guest host Bob Newhart, on May 10, 1980. Reflecting on this performance, Cockburn called the experience "so terrifying. It was American national TV, and I didn't feel ready for it all."

== Personnel ==
- Bruce Cockburn – guitar, lead vocals
- Pat Godfrey – piano, marimba, backing vocals
- Larry "Sticky Fingers" Silvera – bass, backing vocals
- Ben Bow – drums, güiro, backing vocals

== Charts ==
Chart (1979–1980)	Peak position
Australia (ARIA)	92
Canada Top Singles (RPM)	39
Canada Adult Contemporary (RPM)	6
US Billboard Hot 100	21
US Adult Contemporary (Billboard)	22

== Covers ==
- Leo Sayer on the 1982 album World Radio.
- Vigilantes of Love on the 2000 compilation album Roaring Lambs.
- Jimmy Buffett on the soundtrack for the 2006 film Hoot
- Donavon Frankenreiter on his 2007 album Recycled Recipes.
