= In the Falling Dark =

Studio album by Bruce Cockburn
- Released: 1977
- Recorded: September – November 1976
- Genre: Folk
- Length: 48:29
- Labels: True North (Canada); Island Records (United States)
- Producer: Eugene Martynec

Bruce Cockburn chronology
Joy Will Find a Way (1975)	In the Falling Dark (1977)	Further Adventures Of (1978)

In the Falling Dark is the seventh studio album by Canadian singer/songwriter Bruce Cockburn. The album was released in 1977 by True North Records. It is considered a watershed moment in Cockburn's recording career, as he leaves behind the minimal acoustic arrangements of his earlier albums, presenting a fuller band sound.

== Release ==
Cockburn embarked on a tour across Canada beginning in Fredericton on February 20, 1977 and concluding on May 15 at the McPherson Playhouse in Victoria, British Columbia. He was accompanied on this tour by Bill Usher on percussion, Bob Boucher on bass, and Pat Godfrey on keyboards.

Cockburn extensively toured in Quebec, where he spoke in French both in radio interviews, on Motreal television, and in front of audiences. One of the songs on the album, "Vagabondage", was written in French. According to James Holt of RPM Cockburn's performances in Quebec were nearly sold-out and frequently received standing ovations from the audience and encores. Two of his concerts at Massey Hall were recorded and planned for release as a live album in autumn 1977. Material from these concerts was included on Cockburn's Circles in The Stream album later that year.

By May 1977, In the Falling Dark had sold 25,000 copies in Canada. It received a Canadian Gold Record Award in 1985.

In the Falling Dark was released in the United States by Island Records and initially received airplay on over 25 FM radio stations across the country, including WNEW-FM and WHFS. It was his first album to chart in the United States, reaching No. 191 on Cashbox. Prior to its debut on the chart, Cockburn had played at Alice Tully Hall in New York City, serving as the opener for Leon Redbone.

== Reception ==
Professional ratings
Review scores
Source	Rating
AllMusic	4/5 stars

Cashbox lauded Cockburn's guitar playing, specifically on "Water Into Wine" and said that "it's in his lyrical expression that Cockburn makes his greatest impact."

In a retrospective review, AllMusic critic Brett Hartenbach wrote, "As a whole, this record trumps anything that its predecessors had to offer, almost to the point where it's difficult to imagine that it followed the release of Joy Will Find a Way by only a year. The sound that was merely suggested on his previous recordings is fully realized here... His first U.S. release since 1972, In the Falling Dark may not have made Bruce Cockburn a household name, but it did mark his emergence as an important artist."

== Track listing ==
All songs written by Bruce Cockburn except where noted.

1. "Lord of the Starfields" – 3:22
2. "Vagabondage" – 4:17
3. "In the Falling Dark" (Bruce Cockburn, Marcel Moussette)– 4:50
4. "Little Seahorse" – 4:30
5. "Water into Wine" – 5:30
6. "Silver Wheels" – 4:41
7. "Giftbearer" – 4:39
8. "Gavin's Woodpile" – 8:07
9. "I'm Gonna Fly Some Day" – 4:02
10. "Festival of Friends" – 4:38

2003 Deluxe remaster bonus tracks

1. "Red Brother Red Sister" – 4:16
2. "Untitled Guitar" – 8:46
3. "Shepherds" – 7:15
4. "Dweller by a Dark Stream" – 4:18

== Album credits ==
Personnel

- Bruce Cockburn – composer, vocals, guitar, dulcimer
- Dennis Pendrith – bass on 4 and 9
- Michel Donato – bass on 1–3 and 6–7
- Bob DiSalle – drums on 1–4, 6–7, and 9
- Bill Usher – percussion on 1–2, 4, 6–7, and 9
- Tom Anderson – percussion on 3
- Kathryn Moses – flute on 2, 4, and 7; piccolo on 9
- Fred Stone – flugelhorn on 6 and 9; trumpet on 7
- Luke Gibson – backing vocals on 9
- Lynn MacDonald – backing vocals on 9
- Erin Malone – backing vocals on 9

Production

- Marcel Mousette – translation
- Eugene Martynec – producer
- Arnaud Maggs – front cover photo
- Ted Grant – back cover photo
- Bart Schoales – art direction
- Bernie Finkelstein – direction

== Chart performance ==
Chart (1977)	Peak position
Canada Top Albums (RPM)	44
US Cash Box Top 100 Pop Singles	191

== Certifications ==
Certifications and sales for In the Falling Dark
Region	Certification	Certified units/sales
Canada (Music Canada)	Gold	50,000^{^}
^{*} Sales figures based on certification alone.^{^} Shipments figures based on certification alone.
