= Inner City Front =

Studio album by Bruce Cockburn
- Released: 1981
- Recorded: April – June, 1981
- Genres: Folk, pop
- Length: 44:49
- Label: True North
- Producer: Bruce Cockburn

Bruce Cockburn chronology
Humans (1980)	Inner City Front (1981)	The Trouble with Normal (1983)

Inner City Front is the eleventh full-length album by Canadian singer/songwriter Bruce Cockburn, released in 1981 by True North Records. It was produced Cockburn at Manta Sound in Toronto.

The album marked a further embrace of politically oriented songs and a greater emphasis on electric guitar playing. This was Cockburn's first studio album that he self-produced; he later expressed dissatisfaction with his work in a 1997 interview with RPM. In the album's liner notes, lyrics were printed in both English and French.

== Release ==
Inner City Front had leaked to certain radio stations in the United States earlier than anticipated as one of the computers owned by CBS had unexpectedly pushed the release date forward. This resulted in the CBS promotion team distributing the album from their company's warehouse to some radio stations across the United States. True North, Cockburn's record company in Canada, attempted to recall all copies of Inner City Front that were prematurely distributed.

Inner City Front reached the top 20 in Canada and also spawned the single "You Pay Your Money and You Take Your Chance", which reached No. 21 on the Canadian adult contemporary chart. In the United States, "Radio Shoes" was released as a single, an instrumental jazz fusion composition that featured violin playing from Hugh Marsh

=== Rumours of Glory Documentary ===
During the tour supporting Cockburn's Inner City Front album, concert footage for Cockburn's Rumours of Glory documentary was filmed at the Danforth Music Hall in Toronto from November 30 and December 1, 1981. Martin Lavut directed the documentary, with Bill House and Bernie Finkelstein serving as producers. Billboard said in the February 13, 1982 edition of their publication that the Rumours of Glory documentary would contain 90 minutes of concert footage along with interviews and behind-the-scenes footage.

The concerts were recorded on a 24-track in Dolby Stereo and filmed with five cameras. The title track was one of the songs included in the concert film, which was exclusively licensed to First Choice in 1983. It was also entered in the Los Angels International Film Exposition that same year. Cashbox announced that a US distribution deal was being planned for Rumours of Glory in the May 21, 1983 edition of the publication.

== Critical reception ==
Professional ratings
Review scores
Source	Rating
AllMusic	4.5/5 stars
The Rolling Stone Album Guide	3/5 stars

Upon its release, RPM identified "All's Quiet in the Inner City Front", "Broken Wheel", and "Wanna Go Walking" as its "choice cuts" on Inner City Front. Cashbox identified Cockburn's pivot away from acoustic material on Inner City Front in favor of rock, jazz, and new wave music. They commented that Cockburn's "insightful lyrics also have a more biting urban edge" and believed that the material "proves what a truly gifted artist he is". Record World thought that "Wanna Go Walking" possessed "the most pop appeal" on Inner City Front, and said that songs such as "You Pay Your Money" and the title track were lyrically strong. Billboard called Inner City Front "another masterful collection of lyrical song poems that conjure up "true-to-life images of romance, desolation, and confusion." The felt that there were certain portions of the album where the lyrics were "too heavy", but still called him "one of the most articulate writers on the scene".

In a retrospective review, AllMusic critic Brett Hartenbach wrote, "Musically, moody synths, violin, and woodwinds on Inner City Front underscore the dark, reflective nature of the material, which like its predecessor, deals with the "paradox and contrast" in the human condition, from personal relationships to world affairs. Also, for the second consecutive recording, Cockburn eschews the folkier, acoustic leanings of his '70s work and places both feet squarely into the jazz and worldbeat rock that dominated the majority of Humans."

== Track listing ==
All tracks are written by Bruce Cockburn.

No.	Title	Length
1.	"You Pay Your Money and You Take Your Chance"	4:19
2.	"The Strong One"	6:03
3.	"All's Quiet on the Inner City Front"	5:27
4.	"Radio Shoes"	4:16
5.	"Wanna Go Walking"	2:53
6.	"And We Dance"	4:45
7.	"Justice"	4:49
8.	"Broken Wheel"	4:39
9.	"Loner"	7:38

Remastered additional tracks (2002 edition)
No.	Title	Length
10.	"The Coldest Night of the Year"	4:02
11.	"The Light Goes On Forever"	6:51

== Personnel ==
- Bruce Cockburn – vocals, dulcimer, guitar
- Bob DiSalle – drums
- Memo Acevedo – percussion
- Ruholla Khomeini – percussion
- Jon Goldsmith – keyboards
- Dennis Pendrith – bass
- Hugh Marsh – mandolin, violin
- M. Kaddafi – backing vocals
- Murray McLauchlan – backing vocals
- Kathryn Moses – reeds, woodwinds, backing vocals

Production

- Bruce Cockburn – producer
- Bernie Finkelstein – associate producer
- Gary Gray – engineer
- George Marino – mastering
- Bart Schoales – art direction, photography
- George Whiteside – photography

== Chart performance ==
=== Weekly charts ===
Chart (1981)	Peak position
Canada Top Albums/CDs (RPM)	20

=== Year-end charts ===
Chart (1981)	Position
Canada Top Albums (RPM)	99

== Certifications ==
Certifications and sales for Humans
Region	Certification	Certified units/sales
Canada (Music Canada)	Gold	50,000^{^}
^{*} Sales figures based on certification alone.^{^} Shipments figures based on certification alone.
