= Bruce Cockburn =

Canadian singer-songwriter and guitarist (born 1945)

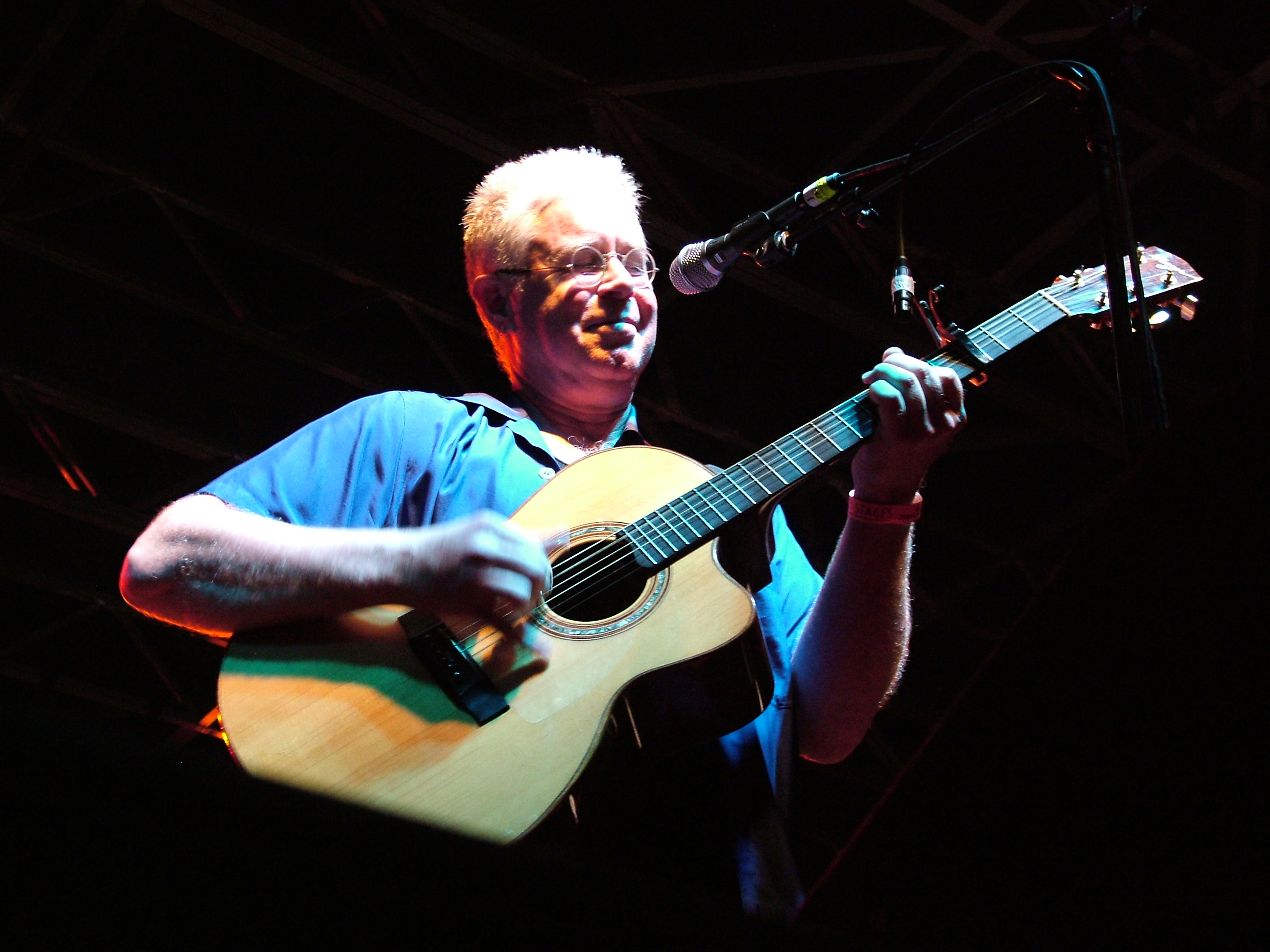
- Cockburn performing in Birmingham, Alabama, in 2007

Background information
- Born: Bruce Douglas Cockburn; May 27, 1945 (age 81); Ottawa, Ontario, Canada
- Genres: Folk; rock
- Instruments: Guitar; vocals
- Years active: 1967–present
- Website: www.brucecockburn.com

Bruce Douglas Cockburn (/ˈkoʊbərn/ KOH-bərn; born May 27, 1945) is a Canadian singer-songwriter and guitarist. His song styles range from folk to folk- and jazz-influenced rock to soundscapes accompanying spoken stories. His lyrics reflect interests in spirituality, human rights, environmental issues, and relationships, and describe his experiences in Central America and Africa.

Cockburn has written more than 350 songs on 34 albums over a career spanning five decades, of which 22 have received a Canadian gold or platinum certification as of 2018, and he has sold more than one million albums in Canada alone. In 2014, Cockburn released his memoir, Rumours of Glory.

== Early life and education ==
Cockburn was born in 1945 in Ottawa, Ontario, and spent some time at his grandfather's farm outside of Chelsea, Quebec, but he grew up in Westboro, a neighbourhood in Ottawa, when he was a teenager. His father, Doug Cockburn, was a radiologist, eventually becoming head of diagnostic X-ray at the Ottawa Civic Hospital. He found his first guitar in his grandmother's attic around 1959, adorned it with gold stars, and used it to play along to radio hits. When his first guitar teacher, Hank Sims, declared this instrument unplayable, his parents bought him a Kay archtop with flat wound strings and a DeArmond pickup.

Later he was taught piano and music theory by Peter Hall, the organist at Westboro United Church which Cockburn and his family attended. Cockburn had been listening to jazz and wanted to learn musical composition. Hall encouraged him and, along with his friend Bob Lamble, a lot of time was spent at Hall's house listening to and discussing jazz.

Cockburn attended Nepean High School, where his 1964 yearbook photo states his desire "to become a musician". After graduating, he took a boat to Europe and busked in Paris.

Cockburn attended Berklee School of Music in Boston, where his studies included jazz composition, for three years. That year he dropped out and joined various bands in Ottawa, starting with The Children, where he served as their organist. Other members of the band included Neville Wells and William Hawkins. The Children served as the backing band for The Willows for their first performance. Once this band folded, Cockburn played harmonica with Heavenly Blue, a project that also included Hawkins.

== Career ==
=== Early career ===
In early 1967 he joined the final lineup of the Esquires. He moved to Toronto that summer to form the Flying Circus with Marty Fisher and Gordon MacBain, former Bobby Kris & the Imperials members, and Neil Lillie, ex-Tripp member. The group recorded some material in late 1967 (which remains unreleased) before changing its name to Olivus in the spring of 1968, by which time Lillie (who changed his name to Neil Merryweather) had been replaced by Dennis Pendrith from Livingstone's Journey. Olivus opened for the Jimi Hendrix Experience and Cream in April 1968. That summer Cockburn broke up the band with the intention of going solo, but ended up in the band 3's a Crowd with David Wiffen, Colleen Peterson, and Richard Patterson, who had been a co-member of The Children. Cockburn left 3's a Crowd in the spring of 1969 to pursue a solo career. Cockburn went on to produce Wiffen's 1973 album Coast to Coast Fever.

Cockburn's first solo appearance was at the Mariposa Folk Festival in 1967, and in 1969 he was a headliner. In 1970, he released his self-titled, solo album. A single, "Going to the Country", appeared on the RPM Top 50 Canadian Chart.

Cockburn's guitar work and songwriting won him an enthusiastic following. His early work featured rural and nautical imagery and Biblical metaphors. Raised as an agnostic, early in his career he became a Christian. Many of his albums from the 1970s refer to Christian themes, which in turn inform his concerns for human rights and environmentalism. His references to Christianity include the Grail imagery of 20th-century Christian poet Charles Williams and the ideas of theologian Harvey Cox.

In 1970, Cockburn became partners with Bernie Finkelstein in the music publishing firm Golden Mountain Music. He won the Juno for Canadian Folksinger of the Year, three years in a row, 1971–1973. He was nominated for Canadian Folksinger of the Year and Male Vocalist of the Year at the 1974 Juno Awards.

While Cockburn had been popular in Canada for years, he did not have a big impact in the United States until 1979, with the release of the album Dancing in the Dragon's Jaws. The album's first single, "Wondering Where the Lions Are", reached No. 21 on the Billboard Hot 100 in the US in June 1980, earning Cockburn an appearance on NBC's TV show Saturday Night Live. Cockburn's label, True North Records, also signed a distribution deal with Recordi Records in Italy.

=== 1980s and 1990s ===
Two Bruce Cockburn compilation albums were released in 1981, with Mummy Dust being distributed in Canada and Resume being made available in the United States. Mummy Dust contained material up until Dancing in the Dragon's Jaws whereas Resume consisted of material largely spanning from 1976–1978. Both of these albums included the newly recorded single, "The Coldest Night of the Year".

Through the 1980s, Cockburn's songwriting became increasingly urban, global and political as he became more involved with progressive causes. His political concerns were first hinted at on the albums: Humans, Inner City Front and The Trouble with Normal. They became more evident in 1984, with his second US radio hit, "If I Had a Rocket Launcher" (No. 88 in the US) from the Stealing Fire album. He had written the song a year earlier, after visiting Guatemalan refugee camps in Mexico that were attacked by Guatemalan military helicopters. His political activism continues to the present. His internationalist bent is reflected in the many world music influences in his music, including reggae and Latin music.

In 1991, Intrepid Records released Kick at the Darkness, a tribute album to Cockburn whose title comes from a phrase in his song "Lovers in a Dangerous Time". It features the Barenaked Ladies' cover of that song, which became their first Top 40 hit and an element in their early success. This lyric was also referenced by U2 in their song "God Part II" from their album Rattle and Hum. Also in 1991, three of Cockburn's songs were listed in a Toronto Star survey among Toronto's top songs of all time.

In the early 1990s, Cockburn teamed with T Bone Burnett for two albums, Nothing but a Burning Light and Dart to the Heart. The latter included a song, "Closer to the Light", inspired by the death of songwriter Mark Heard, a close friend of Cockburn and Burnett. Cockburn frequently refers to Heard as his favourite songwriter and he was one of many artists who paid tribute to Heard on an album and video titled Strong Hand of Love.

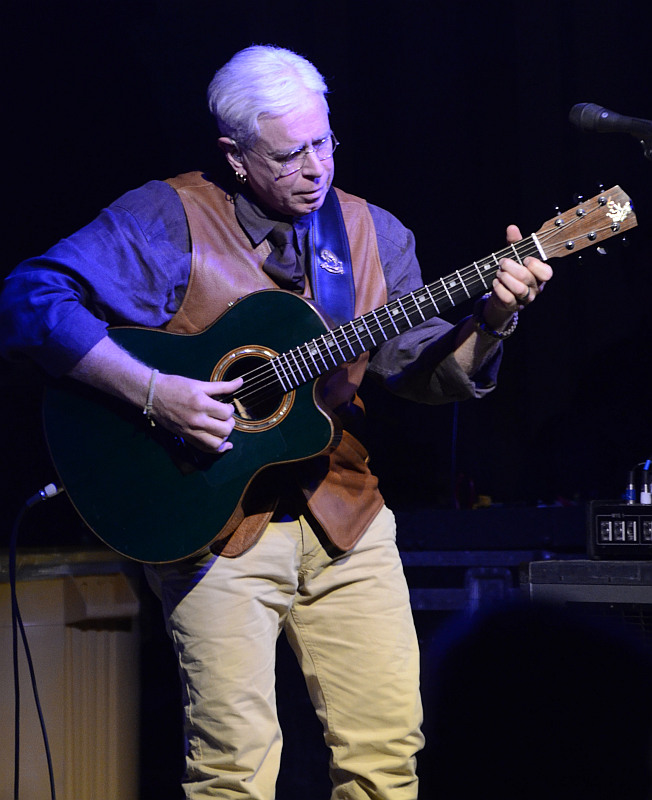
Bruce Cockburn at Markham Jazz Festival 2014

=== 2000s ===
In 2001, Cockburn performed as part of the Music Without Borders concert, a benefit for the United Nations Donor Alert Appeal, which raised funds for refugees from Afghanistan, at the Air Canada Centre in Toronto.

In January 2003, Cockburn finished recording his 21st album, You've Never Seen Everything, which features contributions from Emmylou Harris, Jackson Browne, Sam Phillips, Sarah Harmer, and Andy Milne.

Some of Cockburn's previously published material had been collected in several albums: Resume, Mummy Dust, and Waiting for a Miracle. His first greatest hits collection was Anything Anytime Anywhere: Singles 1979–2002, released in 2002.

Cockburn performed a set at the Live 8 concert in Barrie, Ontario, on July 2, 2005. Speechless, an instrumental compilation of new and previously released material, was released on October 24, 2005. His 22nd album, Life Short Call Now, was released on July 18, 2006.

Canadian senator and retired general Roméo Dallaire, who is active in humanitarian fundraising and promoting awareness, appeared on stage at the University of Victoria with Cockburn. The October 4, 2008, concert was held to aid the plight of child soldiers.

In 2009, Cockburn travelled to Afghanistan to visit his brother, Medical Officer Capt. John Cockburn, and to play a concert for Canadian troops. He performed his 1984 song "If I Had a Rocket Launcher" and was temporarily awarded an actual rocket launcher by the military. Cockburn has stated that, while unsure of the original Invasion of Afghanistan, he supported Canada's role there.

=== 2010s and 2020s ===
Cockburn released the studio album Small Source of Comfort in 2011. In 2018, Cockburn's album Bone on Bone, was named Contemporary Roots Album of the Year at the Juno Awards.

His album Blood of Others was released in October 2026, which consists of covers that Cockburn listened to growing up.

== Documentaries and soundtracks ==
Cockburn wrote and performed "Hey, It's Franklin!", the theme song for the children's television series Franklin (1997–2004). In 2024, Beyoncé released the country song "Texas Hold 'Em", which some people believed sounded similar to "Hey, It's Franklin!". In response, Cockburn released a statement denying any major similarities and saying he wished Beyoncé the best of success.

He composed material for the English-Canadian film Goin' Down the Road (1970), directed by Donald Shebib. He also composed and performed, with Hugh Marsh, the music for the National Film Board of Canada documentary feature Waterwalker (1984), directed by Bill Mason.

In 1998, Cockburn travelled with filmmaker Robert Lang to Mali, West Africa, where he jammed with blues musician Ali Farka Toure and kora player Toumani Diabate. The month-long journey was documented in the film River of Sand, which won the Regard Canadien award for best documentary at the Vues d'Afrique Film Festival in Montreal. It was also invited for competition at the International Festival of Environmental Films in Paris.

In 2007, Cockburn's music was used in the film adaptation of Irvine Welsh's novel Ecstasy: Three Tales of Chemical Romance.

A documentary film, Bruce Cockburn Pacing the Cage, was released in 2013 on television and a brief theatrical showing; directed by Joel Goldberg, gave a look into Cockburn's music, life and politics.

In 2018, Cockburn contributed the song "3 Al Purdys" to the compilation album The Al Purdy Songbook.

== Personal life ==
Cockburn was married from 1969 to 1980 to Kitty Macaulay and has a daughter from that marriage. Cockburn began to identify as a Christian in 1974, having converted after he experienced a crisis that arose from a conflict in his marriage with Macaulay.

Cockburn does not belong to any specific Christian denomination and said that his faith centers around "a personal ongoing conversation with God". Cockburn has distanced himself from conservative christianity, saying that "I get tired of having to apologize for the fact that I'm a Christian and I don't happen to be like Jimmy Swaggart. Christianity involves surrender, not control."

Cockburn married his longtime girlfriend M. J. Hannett in 2011, shortly after the birth of his second daughter. As of 2014, Cockburn and his family live in the San Francisco area, where Cockburn wrote his memoirs.

=== Activism ===
Cockburn's songwriting is often political, expressing concern for the environment and the welfare of indigenous peoples. Baker's Biographical Dictionary of Musicians writes, "Cockburn always risked an outspoken stand in his work, taking on issues and morality to the detriment of his popular appeal. No artist since Phil Ochs has taken such strong political stands." He has worked with relief agency Oxfam, travelling to Central America in 1983, and with the International Campaign to Ban Landmines. The song "Mines of Mozambique" (The Charity of Night) reflects his observations of that country during a visit in 1995. Cockburn is affiliated with the Unitarian Service Committee of Canada, twice visiting Nepal with the charity, in 1987 and 2007.

Songs on these themes include "If I Had a Rocket Launcher" (Stealing Fire), an angry response to the plight of refugees in Central America; "Stolen Land" (Waiting for a Miracle), about the land claims of British Columbia's Haida people; and "If A Tree Falls" (Big Circumstance)—one of Cockburn's best-known songs—decrying the deforestation of the Amazon.

== Awards and honours ==
=== 1980–2010 ===
Cockburn was made a Member of the Order of Canada in 1982 and was promoted to Officer in 2002. In 1998, he received the Governor General's Performing Arts Award for Lifetime Artistic Achievement, Canada's highest honour in the performing arts.

He has received thirteen Juno Awards, and in 2001, during the 30th Annual Juno Awards ceremony, Cockburn was inducted into the Canadian Music Hall of Fame. The Cockburn tribute during the awards included taped testimonials from U2's Bono, Jackson Browne, Cowboy Junkies' Margo Timmins, and Midnight Oil's Peter Garrett. That year he was presented with a SOCAN Folk/Roots award.

The Canadian Association of Broadcasters inducted Cockburn into the Canadian Broadcast Hall of Fame on October 22, 2002, in Vancouver. On November 27, 2002, the CBC's Life and Times series aired a special feature on Cockburn titled The Life and Times of Bruce Cockburn.

In 2007, Cockburn received three honorary doctorates, the fourth, fifth and sixth of his career. In early May he received an Honorary Doctorate of Divinity from Queen's University in Kingston, Ontario, and later in the month he received an Honorary Doctor of Letters at the convocation of Memorial University of Newfoundland for his lifelong contributions to Canadian music, culture and social activism. He was then awarded an Honorary Doctorate from the University of Victoria in Victoria, British Columbia. Cockburn previously received honorary doctorates from York University in Toronto, Berklee College of Music, and St. Thomas University in New Brunswick. He received an Honorary Doctorate awarded by McMaster University in 2009. In June 2014, Cockburn received an honorary Doctorate of Letters from Laurentian University in Sudbury, and Doctor of Laws, Honoris Causa, from Carleton University, in Ottawa.

=== 2010s–2020s ===
Cockburn received Earth Day Canada's Outstanding Commitment to the Environment Award in 2010, and the Queen Elizabeth II Diamond Jubilee Medal in 2012. On November 19, 2012, he received the Lifetime Achievement Award of the Society of Composers, Authors and Music Publishers of Canada, at the 2012 SOCAN Awards in Toronto. On February 15, 2017, he received the People's Voice Award in Kansas City from Folk Alliance International. On September 23, 2017, Cockburn was inducted into the Canadian Songwriters Hall of Fame at a ceremony held at Massey Hall in Toronto.

On June 14, 2024, Cockburn received an Honorary Doctorate in Music from Wilfrid Laurier University. On July 12, 2025, the City of Winnipeg awarded him the Key to the City.

== Covers and tributes ==
A number of artists have covered Cockburn's songs, including:

- Barenaked Ladies ("Lovers in a Dangerous Time")
- Steve Bell (My Dinner with Bruce, an album of Cockburn songs)
- Jimmy Buffett ("Pacing the Cage", "Anything Anytime Anywhere", "All the Ways I Want You", "Life Short Call Now", "Wondering Where the Lions Are" (in the movie Hoot))
- Judy Collins ("Pacing the Cage")
- Lori Cullen ("Fall")
- Dan Fogelberg ("Lovers in a Dangerous Time")
- Frazey Ford ("Lovers in a Dangerous Time")
- Donavon Frankenreiter ("Wondering Where the Lions Are")
- George Hamilton IV ("Together Alone")
- Billie Hughes ("Arrows of Light")
- The Jerry Garcia Band ("Waiting for a Miracle")
- Dianne Heatherington and Ani DiFranco and Mary Coughlan ("Mama Just Wants to Barrelhouse All Night Long")
- Michael Hedges ("Wondering Where the Lions Are")
- k.d. lang ("One Day I Walk")
- Anne Murray ("One Day I Walk", "Musical Friends")
- Holly Near ("To Raise the Morning Star")
- Michael Occhipinti and Edward Weir (Creation Dream, an album containing jazz arrangements of Cockburn's songs)
- The Rankin Family ("One Day I Walk")
- Raylene Rankin ("All the Diamonds")
- Tom Rush ("One Day I Walk')
- Vigilantes of Love ("Wondering Where the Lions Are")
- T. Thomason ("Lovers in a Dangerous Time")
- Hawksley Workman ("The Coldest Night of the Year", "Silver Wheels")

== Discography ==
Studio albums

- Bruce Cockburn (1970)
- High Winds, White Sky (1971)
- Sunwheel Dance (1972)
- Night Vision (1973)
- Salt, Sun and Time (1974)
- Joy Will Find a Way (1975)
- In the Falling Dark (1976)
- Further Adventures Of (1978)
- Dancing in the Dragon's Jaws (1979)
- Humans (1980)
- Inner City Front (1981)
- The Trouble with Normal (1983)
- Stealing Fire (1984)
- World of Wonders (1986)
- Big Circumstance (1989)
- Nothing but a Burning Light (1991)
- Christmas (1993) (certified 6 times platinum in Canada for sales of over 600,000)
- Dart to the Heart (1994)
- The Charity of Night (1997)
- Breakfast in New Orleans, Dinner in Timbuktu (1999)
- You've Never Seen Everything (2003)
- Life Short Call Now (2006)
- Small Source of Comfort (2011)
- Bone on Bone (2017)
- Crowing Ignites (2019)
- O Sun O Moon (2023)
- The Blood of Others (2026)
