= Gene Martynec =

Canadian musician and record producer (born 1947)

- Birth name: Eugene Martynec
- Born: 1947 (age 77–78)
- Origin: Canada
- Occupation(s): Musician, composer, record producer

Eugene "Gene" Martynec (born March 28 1947) is a Canadian musician, composer, and record producer. Martynec has worked across multiple musical disciplines as a guitarist, synthesist, pianist, and bassist.

== Career ==
Martynec first became known as a guitarist in the Toronto group Bobby Kris & The Imperials in August 1965. He left the group in May 1967 to form Kensington Market with singer/songwriter Keith McKie, bass player Alex Darou, and drummer Jimmy Watson. He played acoustic guitar, bass, and synthesizer on Lou Reed's 1973 album Berlin, along with providing the vocal arrangement on "The Bed."

As a record producer, he received the Juno Award for Producer of the Year in 1981 for his work on Bruce Cockburn's "Tokyo" and Rough Trade's "High School Confidential." His work with Edward Bear for "Last Song" was also recognized with a Juno in 1973. Martynec also produced the Top 40 single "Listen To The Radio," recorded by The Pukka Orchestra in 1984.

Martynec has performed, composed, and recorded with pop groups and pit orchestras, and created music for visual media and live theater. He studied electronic music, composition, and orchestration with Samuel Dolin at The Royal Conservatory of Music, where he received two scholarships to study electronic music and composition (1970–1975).

Martynec has been awarded Canada Council for the Arts and Toronto Arts Council grants for music composition, and taught signal processing, principles of digital audio, MIDI, studio production, synthesis, and studio orchestration at the Harris and Trebas institutes in Toronto.

In late 1997, he released Silica, his first composed and interactive electro-acoustic music solo. The Barcelona Duets was released in 2002. In 2004, he co-composed a series of duets for various instruments and interactive computer music called Toronto Duets, funded by the Canada Council for the Arts. From 2000 to 2004, he curated Eugene's Sunday Series, an exploration of new music and other art forms at the Artword Theatre.

In 2004, Martynec moved to Beijing for two years, where he performed in Yunnan Province with Yan Jun, a sound artist, music critic, poet, and organizer, and at several music and art festivals, including the Dashanzi International Arts Festival and the Bookworm Beijing performance venue.

Based in London, England, from 2007 through 2010, he performed with the London Improvisers Orchestra and many small ensembles, including the string trio Barrel and Triptec. He played with Amsterdam's Royal Improvisers Orchestra and Wuppertal Improvisers Orchestra in 2009 and 2010.

In 2010, he organized the formation of the Toronto Improvisers Orchestra. Since then, he has been involved with the Toronto improvising community, playing at Somewhere There and with Bruce Cassidy in So Nu and other Toronto music improvisers.
