= True North Records =

- Founded: 1969
- Founder: Bernie Finkelstein
- Distributor: IDLA Associated Label Distribution
- Genre: Various
- Country of origin: Canada
- Location: Waterdown, Ontario
- Official website: truenorthrecords.com

True North Records is a Canadian independent record label.

== History ==
True North Records was founded in Mississauga, Ontario in 1969 by Bernie Finkelstein. By 1971, True North was producing albums for various Canadian musicians, including Bruce Cockburn and Murray McLauchlan, which were then distributed by Columbia Records in Canada. The company also arranged US distribution for some of its artists.

In December 2007, the company was acquired by an investment group led by Linus Entertainment with Finkelstein remaining as Chairman. The company won a Juno Award in 1974 for "Best Independent Record Company of the Year" and began operating a concert division, True North Concerts, in 2008.

== Artists and operations ==
True North Records' artist list includes Bruce Cockburn, Stephen Fearing, Rheostatics, Colin Linden, Lynn Miles, Howie Beck, Murray McLauchlan, John Bottomley, Lighthouse, 54-40, The Guess Who, The Paperboys, Blackie and the Rodeo Kings, David Wiffen, Rough Trade, Lorraine Segato, Gregory Hoskins and the Stickpeople, Scott B. Sympathy, Hunter Valentine, Joel Kroeker, Barney Bentall and Randy Bachman.

Current active artists also include: Matt Andersen, Buffy Sainte-Marie, Old Man Luedecke, Madison Violet, Gordon Lightfoot, The Mahones, and Leeroy Stagger.

The label has also been the Canadian distributor for albums by American and British artists such as Bananarama, Tim Buckley, Shawn Colvin, The Fixx, Stéphane Grappelli, Hoodoo Gurus, Ian Hunter, Janis Ian, Joy Division, Killing Joke, New Order, Harry Nilsson, Mudhoney, Echo & the Bunnymen, Rod Stewart, The String Cheese Incident, Hanson, Lenny Breau and Richard Thompson.

True North Records is distributed by Entertainment One in Canada and the United States; Other distributors include Planet in Australia and New Zealand; IRD in Italy; GO! Entertainment in the Netherlands, Belgium and Luxemburg; Alive AG in Germany, Austria, and Switzerland; Rootsy Music in Sweden, Finland, Denmark and Norway; and Essential Music in the United Kingdom.

In Canada, True North Records distributes for the following labels: Cooking Vinyl, Fuel 2000, SCI Fidelity, Eggy Records and Signature Sounds.

== See also ==
- List of record labels
- True North Gallery
