= Henderson (surname) =

Origin
- Derivation: Mac Eanraig
- Meaning: "Son of Hendry" (Henry); "Son of Henry"
- Region of origin: Scotland

Henderson is a surname of Scottish origin. The name is derived from patronymic form of the name Henry and Hendry, which is a Scottish form of Henry. It means "Son of Hendry" and "Son of Henry". In Scottish Gaelic it is rendered MacEanraig (masculine), and NicEanraig (feminine).

The surname Henderson is borne by numerous unrelated families in Scotland. For example, the Hendersons of Fordell, in Fife, were the chief Lowland family of the name, Clan Henderson. The Hendersons of Glencoe, a sept of Clan Donald, derive their surname from the Gaelic MacEanruig.

The surname was unknown in England prior to the 17th century and is first mentioned in a marriage document between one of the Borders Hendersons and the daughter of a Carlisle merchant at Hexham.

== A ==
- Adele Dunlap (née Henderson; 1902–2017), American academic and supercentenarian
- Ainslie Henderson (born 1979), Scottish singer-songwriter
- Alan Henderson (1944–2017), Northern Irish bassist for the rock band Them
- Alan Henderson (born 1972), African-American basketball player
- Alana Henderson (born 1988), Northern Irish musician, singer, songwriter, and actress
- Alastair Henderson (1911–1979) Scottish footballer
- Albert H. Henderson (1893–1951), American lawyer, politician, and judge
- Alexander Henderson (disambiguation), several people including:
  - Alexander Henderson (American politician) (1738–1815), Scottish merchant and politician in Virginia, United States
  - Alexander Henderson (Canadian politician), historical Member of the Legislative Assembly of British Columbia, Canada
  - Alexander Henderson (theologian) (1583–1646), Scottish theologian
  - Alexander Henderson, 1st Baron Faringdon
  - Alexander D. Henderson, Jr. (1895–1964), vice-president of Purchasing, California Perfume Company
- Alice Henderson (disambiguation), one of several people including:
  - Alice Henderson (novelist), American author
  - Alice Corbin Henderson, American poet and editor
  - Alice Faye Henderson, African-American singer Alice Wonder Land
- Alistair Donald Henderson of Fordell, Australian environmental engineer, inventor, and Chief of the Clan Henderson
- Alvin Henderson (American football) (born 2006), American football player
- Amari Henderson (born 1997), American football player
- Anna Minerva Henderson (1887–1987), teacher, civil servant, and poet
- Andrew Henderson (disambiguation)
- Anketell Henderson, known as A. M. Henderson (1820–1876), clergyman in Australia
- Ann Henderson-Sellers, climatologist
- Anthony Henderson, African-American rapper Krayzie Bone
- Archibald Henderson (1783–1859), fifth Commandant of the US Marine Corps
- Archibald Henderson (politician), United States Congressman from North Carolina
- Arthur Henderson (disambiguation), one of several people including:
  - Arthur Henderson (1863–1935), British union leader, politician, and Nobel Peace Prize Laureate
  - Arthur Henderson (VC) (1894–1917), British Army officer
  - Arthur Henderson, Baron Rowley (1893–1968), British Labour Party politician

== B ==
- Barrington "Bo" Henderson, African-American singer
- Barry Henderson, Conservative member of the House of Commons
- Barton Henderson, Scottish curler, European champion
- Biff Henderson, American television personality
- Bill Henderson (curler), Scottish curler, European champion
- Bill Henderson (Canadian singer), singer and songwriter
- Bill Henderson (novelist) (William McCranor Henderson), American novelist, author of I Killed Hemingway
- Billy Henderson (disambiguation)
- Bobby Henderson, American creator of the satirical parody religion Flying Spaghetti Monsterism
- Brian Henderson (disambiguation)
- Brodie Henderson (rugby union), Canadian rugby player
- Brodie Henderson (engineer), British civil engineer
- Brooke Henderson (born 1997), Canadian golfer
- Bruce Henderson, American management consultant
- Bryan Henderson, American football player

== C ==
- C. J. Henderson (disambiguation), multiple people
- Cam Henderson, American college sports coach
- Camille Henderson, Canadian singer
- Carlos Henderson, American football player
- Caspar Henderson, British journalist
- Charles Henderson (disambiguation), several people including:
  - Charles Henderson (historian), British antiquarian, historian of Cornwall
  - Charles Henderson Yoakum, American politician
  - Charles Roy Henderson, American geneticist and statistician
- Charlie Butler-Henderson, British motor racing driver
- Caroline Henderson (disambiguation)
- Chris Henderson, American soccer player
- Claude Henderson, South African cricketer

== D ==
- Dan Henderson, American martial arts fighter
- Darius Henderson (born 1981), Nottingham Forest football player
- Darrell Henderson (born 1997), American football player
- David Henderson (disambiguation), one of several people including:
  - David Henderson (basketball), 1991 Israeli Basketball Premier League MVP, head basketball coach at the University of Delaware
  - David Henderson (British Army officer), senior British Army and, later, RAF officer
  - David Henderson (economist), chief economist at the OECD in Paris from 1984 to 1992
  - David B. Henderson, prominent U.S. politician of the 1890s and 1900s
  - David N. Henderson (1921–2004), U.S. Representative from North Carolina
  - Dave Henderson, Major League Baseball player
  - Dave Henderson (footballer), Irish football player
- Dean Henderson (born 1997), English footballer
- De'Angelo Henderson (born 1992), American football player
- Sir Denys Henderson (1932–2016), chairman of Imperial Chemical Industries from 1987 to 1995
- Devery Henderson, American football player
- Diane Henderson, American applied mathematician
- Dick Henderson, English comedian (father of Dickie Henderson)
- Dickie Henderson, British comedian
- Don Henderson, British actor
- Donald Henderson (1928–2016), American epidemiologist who led the World Health Organization's successful World Smallpox Eradication Campaign
- Donnie Henderson, American football figure
- Doug Henderson (Labour politician) (born 1949), British politician
- Douglas Henderson (SNP politician) (1935–2006), British politician
- Douglas Mackay Henderson (1927–2007), Scottish botanist
- Duke Henderson (1925–1973), American blues shouter and jazz singer

== E ==
- Ebenezer Henderson (1784–1858), Scottish minister and missionary
- Ebenezer Henderson (writer) (1809–1879), Scottish historian and science writer
- Edith Henderson, American landscape architect
- Ed Henderson (1884–1964), American baseball pitcher
- Eddie Henderson (disambiguation), several people
- Edmund Henderson (1821–1896), head of London Metropolitan Police
- Edward Henderson (disambiguation), several people
- Edwin Henderson (1883–1977), American educator and NAACP pioneer
- Edwin Hubert Henderson (1885–1939), Chief Architect of the Commonwealth of Australia 1929–1939
- Elizabeth Brownrigg Henderson (1875–1975), American suffragist and librarian
- Ella Henderson, British singer
- Elsie Henderson (1880–1967), British artist
- Emmanuel Henderson (born 2003), American football player
- Erica Henderson, American comic artist
- Erma Henderson (1917–2009), American politician and civil rights activist
- Eugénie Henderson (1914–1989), British linguist and academic

== F ==
- Faye Henderson, Scottish bagpipe player
- Fergus Henderson, British chef
- Fletcher Henderson (1897–1952), African-American jazz and swing musician
- Florence Henderson (1934–2016), American television actress
- Frank Henderson (disambiguation)
- Frederick Henderson, CEO of General Motors

== G ==
- Gary Henderson (baseball coach), American college baseball coach
- George Henderson (disambiguation), one of several people including:
  - George Henderson (Australian politician), Australian politician
  - George Henderson (Manitoba politician) (1916–2008), MLA in Manitoba
  - George Henderson (Prince Edward Island politician), former Member of Parliament in Canada
  - George Francis Robert Henderson (1854–1903), British soldier and military author
  - George R. Henderson (1893–1964), World War II-era officer in United States Navy
  - George Stuart Henderson (c. 1894 – 1920), recipient of the Victoria Cross
  - George Wylie Henderson (1904–1965), American author of the Harlem Renaissance
  - Krazy George Henderson, American cheerleader
- Gerald Henderson (born 1956), American basketball player
- Gerald Henderson Jr. (born 1987), son of the above, also an American basketball player
- Gerard Henderson, Australian journalist and commentator
- Gilbert Henderson, Canadian sports shooter
- Girard B. Henderson, CEO of Alexander Dawson, Inc.
- Gordon Henderson (disambiguation), one of several people including:
  - Gordon Henderson (lawyer), Canadian lawyer
  - Gordon Henderson (politician), British Conservative Member of Parliament
- Grace Henderson, American silent film and stage actress
- Greg Henderson, professional New Zealand track and road racing cyclist
- Greig Henderson, Scottish curler and coach, European champion
- Gunnar Henderson (born 2001), American baseball player
- Gus Henderson, American football coach

== H ==
- Hamish Henderson, Scottish poet
- Harold Lloyd Henderson, Canadian Presbyterian minister and politician
- Hazel Henderson (1933–2022), British futurist writer
- Helen Anne Henderson, Canadian journalist and disability rights activist
- Henrietta Caroline Henderson (1868-1959), Scottish DBE
- Herb Henderson (Australian footballer), Australian rules footballer
- Herbert Stephen Henderson, British soldier
- Horace Henderson (1904–1988), American jazz musician, brother of Fletcher Henderson

== I ==
- Iain Henderson, rugby union player for Ulster and Ireland
- Ian Henderson (disambiguation), one of several people including:
  - Ian Henderson (footballer), English football player
  - Ian Henderson (news presenter), Australian news presenter
  - Ian Henderson (police officer), former head of secret police in Bahrain, accused of torture
- Isaac Henderson, American writer
- Isabelle Bowen Henderson, American painter and floriculturist
- Ivan Henderson, British politician

== J ==
- J. R. Henderson or J. R. Sakuragi (born 1976), American–Japanese basketball player
- J. W. Henderson (1817–1880), fourth governor of Texas
- Jack Henderson, artist, charity fundraiser
- Jack Henderson (author)
- Jackie Henderson (1932–2005), Scottish football player
- James Henderson (disambiguation), one of several people including:
  - James Henderson (footballer, born 1867), footballer for Woolwich Arsenal
  - James Henderson (footballer, born 1870), footballer for Liverpool
  - James Pinckney Henderson (1808–1858), first governor of Texas
  - James (Sákéj) Youngblood Henderson, Indigenous law scholar
- Jarlath Henderson, Irish folk musician, doctor
- Jaylen Henderson (born 2003), American football player
- Jaylon Henderson (born 1997), American football player
- Jeremy Henderson (1952–2009), artist
- Jessie Isabel Henderson (1866–1951), Australian social welfare worker
- Jocko Henderson (1918-2000), American radio disc jockey
- Joe Henderson (disambiguation), one of several people including:
  - Joe Henderson, American jazz saxophonist
  - Joe Henderson (runner)
  - Joe "Mr Piano" Henderson (1920–1980), Scottish pianist, composer and broadcaster
- Jolene Henderson (born 1991), American softball pitcher
- Joseph Henderson (pilot), early American harbor pilot
- John Henderson (disambiguation), one of several people including:
  - John Henderson (Australian rules footballer), Australian rules footballer
  - John Henderson (darts player)
  - John Henderson (defensive tackle) (born 1979), American football player
  - John Henderson (director), British film and television director
  - John Henderson (ice hockey), Canadian ice hockey player
  - John Henderson (Mississippi politician) (1797–1857), U.S. senator from Mississippi
  - John Henderson (Conservative politician) (1888–1975), Conservative MP for Glasgow Cathcart 1946–1964
  - Sir John Henderson, 5th of Fordell (1605–1650), Scottish soldier who brought his military expertise to the Royalists cause during the English Civil War.
  - Sir John Henderson, 5th Baronet of Fordell (1752–1817), Scottish nobleman and politician
  - John B. Henderson (1826–1913), U.S. senator from Missouri and author of the Thirteenth Amendment to the United States Constitution
  - John D. Henderson ("Colonel Jack" Henderson), American editor and pro-slavery politician
  - John E. Henderson, American politician
  - John Ronald Henderson (1920–2003), British Army officer
- Johnny Henderson, an English soldier and aide-de-camp to Field Marshal Viscount Montgomery of Alamein
- Jordan Henderson (born 1990), English footballer
- Jordan Henderson (politician), American politician
- Joseph Welles Henderson, lawyer and Bucknell University president
- Josh Henderson, American actor
- Julian Henderson, Bishop of Blackburn

== K ==
- Karen L. Henderson, American judge
- Katherine Henderson (1909—unknown), American classic female blues singer
- Katherine Henderson (sports executive), Canadian sports executive
- Keith Henderson (American football), American football player
- Keith Henderson (artist), Scottish painter and illustrator
- Kelo Henderson (1923–2019), American film and television actor
- Ken Henderson (baseball coach) (born 1960), American college baseball coach
- Kenneth Henderson, American politician

== L ==
- LaDarius Henderson (born 2001), American football player
- Larry Henderson, Canadian television journalist
- Laura Henderson, English theatrical promoter
- Lawrence Joseph Henderson, American scientist
- Les Henderson, Canadian consumer-fraud author
- Liam Henderson (born 1996), Scottish football player (Celtic FC, Hibernian FC)
- Liam Henderson (English footballer) (born 1989), English football player (Watford FC)
- Linda Dalrymple Henderson, American art historian
- Lizzie George Henderson (1863–1937), American clubwoman and philanthropist
- Lofton R. Henderson, World War II aviator
- Lois T. Henderson, novelist
- Lucius J. Henderson, American silent film director
- Luther Henderson, American arranger
- Logan Henderson (born 1989), American actor/singer

== M ==
- M. R. Henderson, Scottish botanist
- Margot Henderson (born 1964), New Zealand chef
- Marianne K. Henderson, American biomedical scientist
- Marie Therese Henderson, Scottish music director and composer
- Mario Henderson (1984–2020), American football player
- Marjorie Lyman Henderson, the cartoonist Marge
- Mark Henderson (disambiguation), one of several people
- Marshall Henderson (born 1990), American basketball player
- Martin Henderson, New Zealand actor
- Mary Henderson, writer Mary H. Eastman (1818–1887)
- Mary Foote Henderson, socialite and wife of Missouri Senator John Brooks Henderson
- Mary H. J. Henderson (1874 –1938), World War I Scottish Women's Hospital administrator, suffragist and war poet
- Mary Henderson (1919–2004), Greek-British journalist and host
- Matt Henderson (disambiguation), one of several people including:
  - Matt Henderson (cricketer) (1895–1970), New Zealand cricketer
  - Matt Henderson (ice hockey) (born 1974), retired American professional ice hockey player
- Meredith Henderson, Canadian actress
- Michael Henderson (doctor), (born 1937), Vehicle safety researcher
- Monique Henderson, American athlete
- Monroe Henderson (1818–1899), New York politician

== N ==
- Nekeshia Henderson, American basketball player
- Nevile Henderson, British Ambassador to Germany 1937–1939
- Nicholas Henderson, British diplomat
- Nicky Henderson, British racehorse trainer
- Nikki Henderson, (born 1993) British yachtswoman, youngest ever skipper to lead a team in the Clipper Round the World Yacht Race

== O ==
- Othello Henderson, American football player

== P ==
- Paul Henderson (disambiguation), one of several people including:
  - Paul Henderson (born 1943), Canadian ice hockey player
  - Paul Henderson (cricketer), English cricketer
  - Paul Henderson (footballer) (born 1976), Australian football goalkeeper
  - Paul Henderson (journalist) (1939–2018), American journalist and winner of the Pulitzer Prize for Investigative Reporting in 1982
  - Paul Henderson (rugby union) (born 1964), New Zealand rugby union player
- Peter Henderson (disambiguation), multiple people

== Q ==
- Quadree Henderson (born 1996), American football player

== R ==
- Rachel Henderson, American politician
- Ray Henderson (born Raymond Brost, 1896–1970)), American songwriter
- Richard Henderson (disambiguation), one of several people including:
  - Richard Henderson (biologist) (born 1945), Scottish molecular biologist and biophysicist
  - Richard Henderson (jurist) ((1734–1785), American pioneer
- Richard Alexander Henderson (1895–1958), First World War stretcher-bearer at Gallipoli and the Somme
- Rickey Henderson (1958–2024), American baseball player
- Ricky Henderson (born 1988), former Australian rules footballer and anthropologist
- Robert Henderson (disambiguation), one of several people including:
  - Robert Henryson (c. 1425 – c. 1500), Scottish poet
  - Robert Henderson (Welsh cricketer) (1851–1931), English cricketer
  - Robert Henderson (writer) (born 1947), English political writer
  - Rob Henderson (born 1972), English and Irish rugby union footballer
- Rosa Henderson (1896–1968), American jazz singer
- Rose Henderson, New Zealand social worker

== S ==
- Saffron Henderson (born 1967), Canadian actress
- Safiya Henderson-Holmes (1950–2001), African-American poet
- Sákéj Henderson, Indigenous law scholar
- Sam Henderson, American comics artist
- Sammy Henderson, Scottish footballer
- Sara Henderson, Australian writer
- Sarah Henderson, Australian politician and former journalist
- Scoot Henderson (born 2004), American basketball player
- Scott Henderson, American guitarist
- Scott Henderson (golfer), Scottish golfer
- Sean Henderson, American soccer player
- Shirley Henderson, Scottish actress
- Skitch Henderson, musician and band leader
- Stephen Henderson, Irish footballer
- Stewart Henderson (footballer, born 1947), Scottish footballer
- Seth Aaron Henderson, American Fashion Designer

== T ==
- Thelton Henderson, federal judge
- Thomas Henderson (disambiguation), one of several people including:
  - Thomas Henderson (American football), NFL football player
  - Thomas Henderson (astronomer) (1798–1844), Scottish Astronomer Royal
  - Thomas Henderson (Liberal politician), Scottish Liberal Member of Parliament for Roxburghshire and Selkirkshire 1922–1923
  - Thomas Henderson (New Jersey politician), U.S. congressman
  - Thomas Henderson (New Zealand politician), New Zealand politician
  - Tom Henderson (Labour politician) (1867–1960), Scottish Labour Cooperative politician
  - Thomas Finlayson Henderson (1844–1923), Scottish author
  - Thomas J. Henderson (activist), American businessman
  - Thomas J. Henderson (politician), United States congressman from Illinois
  - Tommy Henderson, Northern Ireland politician
- Tova Henderson (born 2004), Canadian ice hockey player
- Trayvon Henderson (born 1995), American football player
- TreVeyon Henderson (born 2002), American football player
- Trevor Henderson (born 1986), Canadian artist

== U ==
- Ursula Henderson, South Australian politician

== V ==
- Valerie Henderson (born 1986), American footballer
- Vicki Butler-Henderson, British racing driver and television presenter
- Virginia Henderson, American nurse

== W ==
- Wayne Henderson (disambiguation), one of several people including:
  - Wayne Henderson (footballer), Irish football player
  - Wayne Henderson (musician), American jazz trombonist
- Wesley Henderson (born 1951), African American architect, historian, and educator
- William Henderson (disambiguation), one of several people including:
  - William Henderson (American football), NFL player
  - William James Henderson, American music critic
  - William Penhallow Henderson, American painter, architect and furniture designer
  - William Williams Henderson, American educator

== X ==
- Xzavier Henderson (born 2002), American football player

== Z ==
- Zac Henderson (1955–2020), American football player
- Zenna Henderson, American author

== Fictional ==
- Christopher Henderson (character), fictional character portrayed by Peter Weller on the television series 24
- Dustin Henderson, fictional character portrayed by Gaten Matarazzo on the Netflix science fiction horror web television series Stranger Things
- Rose Henderson (Lost), married name Nadler, character in TV series Lost
- Inspector Henderson, character from DC Comics
- Isaac Henderson, a character from The Mummy (1999 film)

== See also ==
- Clan Henderson
- Fenderson
