= James Henderson =

James or Jim Henderson may refer to:

== Academics ==
- James Blacklock Henderson (1871–1950), Scottish inventor, engineer, and professor
- James (Sákéj) Youngblood Henderson (born 1944), American indigenous law scholar
- James G. Henderson (born 1945), professor at Kent State University
- James Henderson (surgeon) (1829–1865), British physician, surgeon, and author

== Politicians ==
- James Douglas Henderson (1927–2020), Alberta MLA from 1963 to 1975
- James Henderson (Irish politician) (1846–1924), Lord Mayor of Belfast
- James Henry Dickey Henderson (1810–1885), United States Representative from Oregon
- James M. Henderson (1921–1995), American businessman and politician
- J. Pinckney Henderson (1808–1858), American politician, first governor of Texas
- James W. Henderson (1817–1880), American politician, fourth governor of Texas
- James Henderson Jr. (1942–2022), American politician, member of the Arizona State Senate
- Jim Henderson (Ontario politician) (1940–2020), Canadian politician
- Barry Henderson (James Stewart Barry Henderson, born 1936), Scottish member of the House of Commons
- Sir James Henderson (diplomat), British diplomat

== Sports ==
- Big James Henderson (born 1965), American powerlifter, preacher and motivational speaker
- James Henderson (cricketer, born 1975), South African cricketer
- James Henderson (cricketer, born 1918) (1918—2004), Scottish cricketer and educator
- James Henderson (footballer, born 1867) (1867–?), Scottish footballer (Rangers, Arsenal)
- James Henderson (footballer, born 1870) (1870–?), Scottish footballer (Liverpool)
- James Henderson (footballer, born 1871) (1871–1950), Scottish footballer (Bury)
- James Henderson (footballer, born 1877) (1877–?), English footballer (Reading, Bradford City, Leeds City)
- James Henderson (Newcastle United footballer), English footballer
- James Milne Henderson (1891–1917), Scottish rugby union player and British Army officer
- Mac Henderson (James McLaren Henderson, 1907–2009), Scottish rugby union player
- Skip Henderson (James Henderson, born 1965), American college basketball player
- Jim Henderson (baseball) (born 1982), Canadian professional baseball pitcher
- Jim Henderson (footballer), Scottish footballer
- Jimmy Henderson (racing driver) (born 1983), American stock car racing driver

== Others ==
- James Henderson (artist) (1871–1951), Canadian artist
- James Henderson (businessman) (born 1964), English public relations executive
- James Henderson (minister) (1820–1905), Presbyterian minister in Victoria and South Australia
- James Henderson (priest) (1840–1935), Archdeacon of Northumberland
- James Henderson (publisher) (1823–1906), British publisher of newspapers, comics, books and postcards
- James A. Henderson (born c. 1934), chairman and CEO of Cummins Inc.
- James Henderson (moderator) (1797–1874), Scottish minister of the Free Church of Scotland
- Jim Henderson (sportscaster) (born 1947), American sportscaster
- Jimmy Henderson (musician) (1921–1998), jazz trombonist and bandleader
- Jim Henderson (writer) (1918–2005), New Zealand writer and radio broadcaster

== See also ==
- Jamie Henderson (disambiguation)
