= Jack Henderson =

Jack Henderson may refer to:

- Jack Henderson (actor) (1877–1957), American silent movie actor
- Jack Henderson (author) (born 1958), American thriller writer
- Jack Henderson (canoeist) (1914–?), British sprint canoeist
- Jack Henderson (artist) (born 2004), Scottish artist
- Jack Henderson (Irish footballer) (1844–1932), Irish footballer
- Jack Henderson (Australian footballer) (born 1999), Australian rules footballer

== See also ==
- John Henderson (disambiguation)
- Henderson (surname)
