= Richard Henderson =

Richard Henderson (or variants) may refer to:

== Entertainment ==
- Dick Henderson (1891–1958), English comedian, singer and actor
- Dickie Henderson (1922–1985), English music hall, theatre, film and television entertainer
- Rick Henderson (1928–2004), American jazz saxophonist, composer and arranger

== Government ==
=== United States ===
- Richard Henderson (jurist) (1734–1785), Colonial American judge and land speculator
- Richard Henderson (mayor) (1815–1878), American politician
- Richard Henderson (Hawaii politician) (1928–2026), member of the Hawaii Senate
- Richard Henderson (Kentucky politician) (born 1971), member of the Kentucky House of Representatives

=== Other governments ===
- Richard McNeil Henderson, (1886–1972) British engineer and colonial HK administrator
- Richard Henderson (solicitor) (born 1947), Scottish solicitor

== Others ==
- Richard Alexander Henderson (1895–1958), First World War stretcher-bearer at Gallipoli and the Somme
- Richard Henderson (biologist) (born 1945), Scottish molecular biologist
- Richard Henderson (bishop) (born 1957), Irish Anglican bishop

== See also ==
- Henderson (surname)
