= John Henderson =

John Henderson may refer to:

== Politics ==
- Sir John Henderson, 5th Baronet (1752–1817), British Member of Parliament (MP) for Seaford, 1785–86
- John Henderson (Maryland politician), American politician from Maryland
- John Henderson (Mississippi politician) (1797–1857), United States Senator
- John Henderson (Durham MP) (1811–1884), British Liberal MP for Durham 1864–74
- John D. Henderson, American editor and pro-slavery politician
- John B. Henderson (1826–1913), U.S. Senator and author of 13th Amendment to U.S. Constitution
- John A. Henderson (1841–1904), corporate lawyer and politician in Florida
- John S. Henderson (1846–1916), Representative from North Carolina's 7th district
- John Henderson (West Aberdeenshire MP) (1846–1922), Scottish chartered accountant, barrister and Liberal Member of Parliament
- John M. Henderson (1868–1947), American politician (Texas House, 1907–09; Texas Senate, 1915–19)
- John Henderson (Conservative politician) (1888–1975), Conservative MP for Glasgow Cathcart, 1946–1964
- John Craik-Henderson (1890–1971), British Conservative Party politician
- John E. Henderson (1917–1994), American politician (R–OH)
- John Ward Henderson (1874–1925), American politician in Florida

== Sport ==
=== American football ===
- John G. Henderson (1892–1939), American college football and baseball player and coach
- John Henderson (guard) (1912–2020), American college football player
- John Henderson (wide receiver) (born 1943), American football player
- Jon Henderson (born 1944), American football wide receiver
- John Henderson (defensive tackle) (born 1979), American football player

=== Association football (soccer) ===
- Jack Henderson (Irish footballer) (1844–1932), Irish football (soccer) player
- Jackie Henderson (1932–2005), Scottish football (soccer) player
- John Henderson (Scottish footballer) (born 1941), Scottish footballer

=== Other sports ===
- John Henderson (bowls) (1900–?), Canadian lawn bowler
- John Henderson (cricketer) (1928–2019), New Zealand cricketer
- John Henderson (rugby league) (1929–2014), rugby league footballer of the 1950s
- John Henderson (ice hockey) (1933–2024), Canadian ice hockey player
- John Henderson (Australian rules footballer) (1938–2025), Australian rules footballer with Collingwood
- John Henderson (hurler) (born 1957), Irish hurler
- John Henderson (darts player) (born 1973), Scottish darts player

== Others ==
- John Henderson, 5th of Fordell (1605–1650), Scottish Royalist soldier during the English Civil War
- John Henderson (actor) (1747–1785), English Shakespearean actor
- John Henderson (collector) (1797–1878), English collector of works of art
- John Henderson (architect) (1804–1862), Scottish architect
- John Henderson (painter) (1860–1924), Scottish landscape and portrait painter
- John Robertson Henderson (1863–1925), zoologist
- John Henderson Jr. (1870–1923), American diplomat and educator
- John Henderson (geologist) (1880–1959), New Zealand geologist and science administrator
- John Tasker Henderson (1905–1983), Canadian physicist
- John Oliver Henderson (1909–1974), U.S. federal judge
- Johnny Henderson (soldier) (John Ronald Henderson, 1920–2003), British Army officer
- John Henderson (activist) (1925–2010), Australian-American blind activist
- John L. Henderson (born 1932), American university administrator
- John Henderson (director) (born 1949), British film and television director
- J. G. W. Henderson, English classicist
- John Henderson (British Army officer), British general
- John Henderson (historian), professor of Italian Renaissance history
- John Henderson (engineer), U.S. Army engineer
- John Henderson (Emmerdale), fictional character on the British soap opera Emmerdale

== See also ==
- Jock Henderson (disambiguation)
- Jack Henderson (disambiguation)
- Henderson (surname)
