= Robert Henderson =

Robert, Rob, Robbie, Bob or Bobby Henderson may refer to:

== Sports ==
- Robert Henderson (Welsh cricketer) (1865–1931), Welsh cricketer
- Robert Henderson (Middlesex cricketer) (1851–1895), English cricketer
- Robert Henderson (footballer), English footballer
- Robert Henderson (rugby union, born 1900) (1900–1977), Scottish rugby union player
- Robert Henderson (physician, born 1858) (1858–1924), British physician and England rugby union player
- Bob Henderson (Scottish footballer) (fl. 1929–1932), Scottish footballer (Burnley FC, New Brighton)
- Bobby Henderson (footballer) (1917–2006), Scottish footballer (Partick Thistle, Dundee FC)
- Bob Henderson (Australian footballer) (1934–2019), Australian rules footballer for Fitzroy
- Rob Henderson (born 1972), English and Irish rugby union footballer
- Robbie Henderson (born 1982), Scottish footballer
- Robert Henderson (American football) (born 1983), American football defensive end
- Robert Henderson (speedway rider), Swedish motorcycle speedway rider, see 2010 Individual Ice Racing World Championship

== Politics and military ==
- Robert Henderson (Royal Navy officer) (1778–1843), French Revolutionary and Napoleonic Wars
- Robert Johnson Henderson (1822–1891), Confederate States Army colonel
- Robert Henderson (British politician) (1876–1932), British member of parliament
- Robert James Henderson (1877–1953), member of Canadian Parliament
- Robert Henderson (Canadian politician) (born 1961), Canadian politician in the Legislative Assembly of Prince Edward Island
- Robert Henderson (American politician), member of the Iowa House of Representatives
- Robert Hugh Henderson (1862–1956), South African businessman and politician

== Writers, artists and entertainers ==
- Robert Henderson (actor) (1904–1985), American actor
- Bobby Henderson (musician) (1910–1969), American jazz pianist
- Robert Henderson (writer) (born 1947), English political writer
- Rob K. Henderson (born 1990), American writer and political commentator

== Other people ==
- Robert Henderson (mathematician) (1871–1942), Canadian-American mathematician and actuary
- Robert G. Henderson, sound editor
- Bobby Henderson (activist) (born 1980), creator of the Church of the Flying Spaghetti Monster
- Robert Henderson (River City), fictional character in Scottish soap opera
- Robert Dale Henderson (1945–1993), American serial killer
- Bob Henderson (academic), Canadian professor and author
- Robert Henderson (physician, born 1902) (1902–1999), developed the first iron lung in Britain

== See also ==
- Bert Henderson (disambiguation)
- Robert Henryson (fl. c. 1460–1500), Scottish poet
- Henderson (surname)
