= Thomas J. Henderson =

Thomas J. Henderson may refer to:

- Thomas James Henderson (1798–1844), first astronomer-royal of Scotland
- Thomas J. Henderson (politician) (1824–1911), United States Congressman from Illinois
- Thomas J. Henderson (activist) (1931–2005), American activist and construction business manager

== See also ==
- Thomas Henderson (disambiguation)
