= Brian Henderson =

Brian Henderson may refer to:

- Brian Henderson (academic) (1936–2017), English solid-state spectroscopic physicist
- Brian Henderson (English footballer) (1930–2001), English footballer for Darlington
- Brian Henderson (television presenter) (1931–2021), New Zealand-born Australian television personality
- Brian Henderson (Australian footballer) (1943–2017), Australian footballer for the Carlton Football Club
- Brian Henderson (poet) (born 1948), Canadian writer and poet
- Brian Henderson (ice hockey) (born 1986), French ice hockey player
- Brian Henderson (racing driver) (born 1997), American stock car racing driver
- Brian Henderson (rugby union) (1939–2020), Scottish rugby union player
- Brian Henderson (River City), fictional character
- Brian Henderson (film theorist) (1941-2017), American film theorist

== See also ==
- Bryan Henderson (born 1977), American football defensive lineman
- Brian Henderson-Sellers (born 1950), Australian computer scientist
- Henderson (surname)
