= List of The Incredible Hulk (1978 TV series) episodes =

The following is a list of The Incredible Hulk episodes. The series began with 2, 2-hour made-for-TV movies on November 4 and 27, 1977. Regular one-hour episodes began on March 10, 1978, and ended on May 12, 1982. It was created by Kenneth Johnson, aired on CBS, and ran for 80 episodes.

The Incredible Hulk follows the story of David Banner (played by Bill Bixby), a physician/scientist who, traumatized by the loss of his wife, douses himself with dangerously high levels of gamma radiation. He metamorphosizes into a giant, green hulk (Lou Ferrigno) whenever he becomes angry. The series chronicles Banner's attempts to find a cure for himself, as he is pursued across the United States by investigative newspaper reporter Jack McGee (Jack Colvin). The series was loosely based on the Marvel comic book of the same name.

After the cancellation of the series, 3 television movies aired on NBC (1988, 1989 and 1990). On July 28, 2006, season 1 was officially released on DVD. Season 2 was released in the United States on July 17, 2007. Seasons 3 and 4 were released in June 2008 to coincide with the release of the 2008 Marvel Studios film The Incredible Hulk.

== Series overview ==
Season	Episodes	Originally released		
Season	Episodes	First released	Last released	Network
Pilot movies		November 4, 1977	November 28, 1977	CBS
1	10	March 10, 1978	May 26, 1978	CBS
2	22	September 22, 1978	May 25, 1979	CBS
3	23	September 21, 1979	April 11, 1980	CBS
4	18	November 7, 1980	May 22, 1981	CBS
5	7	October 2, 1981	May 12, 1982	CBS
Movies		May 22, 1988	February 18, 1990	NBC

== Episodes ==
=== Pilot movies (1977) ===
Title	Directed by	Written by	Original release date
The Incredible Hulk	Kenneth Johnson	Kenneth Johnson	November 4, 1977
An accidental overdose of gamma radiation creates a mutation in David Banner (Bill Bixby)'s DNA: whenever he becomes angry, he metamorphoses into an over seven-foot-tall, 330-pound, mindless muscular green creature (Lou Ferrigno). Tabloid newspaper reporter Jack McGee (Jack Colvin) begins investigating claims of a giant creature; his investigation leads to the laboratory that Banner was using. An explosion in the lab kills Banner's associate and friend, Dr. Elaina Marks (Susan Sullivan): McGee, who dubs the creature "the Hulk", believes it killed David, too. Unable to explain the truth or control his transformations, David leaves to try to find a cure for himself. Notes: Originally a two-hour movie (aired on a Friday), it is shown in two parts in syndication. This is the first pilot movie in which Ted Cassidy voices the Hulk.
A Death in the Family The Return of the Incredible Hulk	Alan J. Levi	Kenneth Johnson	November 28, 1977
David continues the run from McGee and the authorities, with everyone believing that he was killed along with Elaina. Still trying to find a cure, David 'Benton' accidentally finds himself in the middle of a plot to kill a young, crippled girl, Julie Griffith (Laurie Prange), so her greedy stepmother (Dorothy Tristan) and physician (William Daniels) can inherit the fortune left behind by her late father. With help from a hermit (John McLiam) who rescued her from the fire that crippled her and killed her father, he manages to save her life and provide her with help so that she can walk again. Gerald McRaney also stars. Notes: Originally a two-hour movie (aired on a Monday), is shown in two parts in syndication.

=== Season 1 (1978) ===
No. overall	No. in season	Title	Directed by	Written by	Original release date
1	1	"Final Round"	Kenneth Gilbert	Kenneth Johnson	March 10, 1978
David 'Benson' finds his way to Wilmington, DE, and into the friendship of Henry "Rocky" Welsh (Martin Kove), an aspiring boxer, along with his boxing friend (John Witherspoon (actor)). David discovers that Henry, unknowingly, has been trafficking heroin for the boxing promoter. The promoter, in order to stay out of prison, arranges a deadly fight for Henry, whose high blood pressure will kill him.
2	2	"The Beast Within"	Kenneth Gilbert	Karen Harris & Jill Sherman	March 17, 1978
David 'Bradburn' begins working at a zoo where research is being conducted on animal aggression. David learns that a corrupt zoo official (Dabbs Greer) is part of a smuggling ring that has been smuggling diamonds within the animals into the zoo. A young scientist, Claudia Baxter (Caroline McWilliams), is framed for the animal deaths, and David is locked in a cage with an aggressive gorilla.
3	3	"Of Guilt, Models and Murder"	Larry Stewart	James D. Parriott	March 24, 1978
After waking up from a transformation at the crime scene of a murdered model, David 'Blaine' tries to piece together the events of the previous night. David is hired as a valet and personal assistant to James Joslin (Jeremy Brett), the employer of model Shiela Cantrell (Loni Anderson), and he uses his new job to investigate the other models who may be linked to the murder, whilst worrying that the Hulk is becoming too out of control; Joslin accuses the Hulk of being the killer.
4	4	"Terror in Times Square"	Alan J. Levi	William Schwartz	March 31, 1978
David 'Blake' begins working in a New York amusement arcade and quickly develops a friendship with the owner (Jack Kruschen) and his daughter (Pamela Susan Shoop). When the owner refuses to pay any further protection fees, the crime boss (Robert Alda) decides to make an example of him.
5	5	"747"	Sigmund Neufeld Jr.	Thomas E. Szollosi & Richard Christian Matheson	April 7, 1978
David 'Brown' is en route from San Francisco to Chicago on a Boeing 747 to meet with another doctor. The airline copilot (Edward Power) and a flight attendant (Sondra Currie) have planned to steal a priceless Egyptian exhibit from the plane's cargo hold by drugging the plane crew. After foiling the plot, David is forced to land the plane in Denver, with the aid of another flight attendant, a teenage plane enthusiast (Brandon Cruz, who played Bixby's son, Eddie, on The Courtship of Eddie's Father), and a on-ground pilot (Ed Peck) during one of his transformations into the Hulk. Jack Colvin does not appear. Note: Some of the plane scenes were taken from the film Airport 1975.
6	6	"The Hulk Breaks Las Vegas"	Larry Stewart	Justin Edgerton	April 21, 1978
When a Las Vegas investigative reporter is injured by the mafia for details about their illegal activities, casino worker David 'Benning' becomes his only chance at exposing them. David must deliver his evidence to McGee, who is still tracking the Hulk's movements across the country.
7	7	"Never Give a Trucker an Even Break"	Kenneth Gilbert	Kenneth Johnson	April 28, 1978
In Nevada, a group of hijackers led by Ted (Frank Christi) and Mike (Grand L. Bush) steal a semi-truck from the father of a young woman named Joanie (Jennifer Darling), who then steals it back. David 'Bradford' becomes entangled in her plans and is forced to transform into the Hulk to save both their lives. Jack Colvin does not appear. Note: Much of the footage from the chase scenes was taken from Steven Spielberg's TV movie Duel.
8	8	"Life and Death"	James D. Parriot	Jeffrey Hayden	May 12, 1978
While on his way to volunteer for a DNA experiment in the fictional Marysville, OR, David 'Bernard' and a young pregnant hitchhiker (Diane Civita) share a ride to the same town, where the young woman explains her plans to give up her newborn child for adoption. David learns that the physician conducting the experiments (Andrew Robinson) is involved in the illegal adoption racket, selling the newborn babies on the black market. Julie Adams also stars.
9	9	"Earthquakes Happen"	Harvey Laidman	Jim Tisdale & Migdia Varela	May 19, 1978
David poses as physicist Dr. Robert Patterson to gain access to a nuclear power plant in California housing powerful gamma-ray equipment. While experimenting with the machine, an earthquake occurs, causing massive cave-ins throughout the facility. With the reactor about to explode, David leads a group of survivors through the facility, then transforms into the Hulk and activates the cooling system to cool the reactors. Note: Footage from the 1974 film Earthquake was used.
10	10	"The Waterfront Story"	Reza S. Badiyi	Paul M. Belous & Robert Wolterstorff	May 26, 1978
David 'Barton' is working as a bartender in Galveston for a widowed bar owner (Sheila Larken), a widow of a man murdered while fighting a corrupt dock worker's union. David manages to find the true murderer and break up the corruption.

=== Season 2 (1978–79) ===
No. overall	No. in season	Title	Directed by	Written by	Original release date
11	1	"Married" "Bride of the Incredible Hulk"	Kenneth Johnson	Kenneth Johnson	September 22, 1978
David 'Benton' travels to Honolulu to meet Dr. Carolyn Fields (Mariette Hartley), a psychologist whose technique might help cure the Hulk. However, Dr. Fields is in the terminal stages of an incurable disease. With the pair working in proximity, love begins to bloom with tragic results. Notes: First aired as a two-hour special, it is shown in two parts in syndication. Titled as Bride of the Incredible Hulk on some video releases. Mariette Hartley won a Emmy Award for Outstanding Lead Actress in a Drama Series for her performance.
12	2	"The Antowuk Horror"	Sigmund Neufeld Jr.	Nicholas Corea	September 29, 1978
After encountering handyman David 'Barton's' alter ego, the citizens of a struggling resort town, Antowuk, UT, invent their own "monster in the woods" as a tourist attraction, drawing the attention of McGee and a merciless big game hunter. Lance LeGault and Bill Lucking also star.
13	3	"Ricky"	Frank Orsatti	Jaron Summers	October 6, 1978
While working at a racetrack in New Mexico, utility worker David 'Beckman' befriends Ricky Deter (Mickey Jones), the brother of the local champ (James Daughton), who is mentally challenged and goaded into driving a defective car in a demolition derby by rival race-drivers (Eric Server, Gerald McRaney). Gordon Jump also stars. Jack Colvin does not appear.
14	4	"Rainbow's End"	Kenneth Gilbert	Karen Harris & Jill Sherman	October 13, 1978
While working at San Remos Racetrack, David 'Bishop' meets a Native American man (Ned Romero) whose medicinal herb brew helps calm the troubled racehorse Rainbow's End, hoping it can help him, but someone does not want the horse to race. Note: This episode shares a title with the later Kenneth Johnson-produced series, Walker, Texas Ranger.
15	5	"A Child in Need"	James D. Parriott	Frank Dandrige	October 20, 1978
Working as a groundskeeper at an elementary school In Lincoln, Nebraska, David 'Baxter' takes matters into his own hands to help Mark (Dennis Dimster), a young boy who he suspects of being abused by his father (Sandy McPeak). Sally Kirkland and Rebecca York also star.
16	6	"Another Path"	Joseph Pevney	Nicholas Corea	October 27, 1978
David 'Braemer' meets a blind Chinese philosopher from San Francisco called Li Sung (Mako) who may be able to help him control the creature, but encounters problems with Steve Silva (Tom Lee Holland), a former student and friend of Li Sung who has perverted the old man's teachings. Jack Colvin does not appear. Notes: This is the first time Banner refers to his alter ego as "the Hulk." Holland's character is erroneously named "Frank Silva" in the credits.
17	7	"Alice in Disco Land"	Sigmund Neufeld Jr.	Karen Harris & Jill Sherman	November 3, 1978
David 'Balon' gets a job at a Discothèque club and meets a young dancer (Donna Wilkes), the daughter of a deceased colleague who is under the influence of alcohol, and David tries to help her put the bottle down for good. Brion James and Marc Alaimo guest star.
18	8	"Killer Instinct"	Ray Danton	Story by : Richard H. Landau and William M. Whitehead & Joel Don Humphreys; Teleplay by : William M. Whitehead & Joel Don Humphreys	November 10, 1978
David 'Burnett' becomes an assistant to a football trainer, successfully curbing aggression, and must help a Los Angeles Cougars player (Denny Miller) with a violent past. Notes: Film of Dick Butkus of the Chicago Bears was used for the football scenes. Some scenes were filmed at the Los Angeles Memorial Coliseum.
19	9	"Stop the Presses"	Jeffrey Hayden	Story by : Susan Woollen; Teleplay by : Karen Harris & Jill Sherman and Susan Woollen	November 24, 1978
While working as a dishwasher at a Chicago Italian restaurant, David 'Bernard' discovers that he was photographed by a Register journalist (Sam Chew Jr.) who writes staged stories about unsanitary restaurants. When they learn the story will run, David and the restaurant owners (Mary Frann, Julie Cobb) plot to steal the photos by breaking into the Register's headquarters. Meanwhile, the Hulk's sighting in Chicago catches the attention of McGee, who is prepared to hunt him down with tranquilizers. Pat Morita and Art Metrano also star.
20	10	"Escape from Los Santos"	Chuck Bowman	Bruce Kalish & Philip John Taylor	December 1, 1978
David 'Brown' and a woman Shelley Fabares are wrongly accused of the murder of the woman's crime-fighting husband by a corrupt sheriff Dana Elcar in Arizona. W.K. Stratton and Lee de Broux also star.
21	11	"Wildfire"	Frank Orsatti	Brian Rehak	January 17, 1979
The oil rig where David 'Blakeman' is working is set on fire by a saboteur. John Anderson, Christine Belford and Billy "Green" Bush also star.
22	12	"A Solitary Place"	Jeffrey Hayden	Jim Tisdale & Migdia Varela	January 24, 1979
Hoping to avoid situations that could lead to his transformation into the Hulk, David 'Bailey' isolates himself in the remote wilderness of Baja California, Mexico, and begins living there temporarily. But his peaceful camping site is disturbed by the arrival of a female surgeon Kathryn Leigh Scott, a fugitive wrongly accused of malpractice by the father Jerry Douglas of a girl who died in her care.
23	13	"Like a Brother"	Reza S. Badiyi	Richard Christian Matheson & Thomas E. Szollosi	January 31, 1979
While working at a car wash in a black neighborhood, David 'Butler' befriends the younger brother (Michael D. Roberts) of a co-worker (Stuart K. Robinson) who is being exploited by a drug lord (Tony Burton) with a black panther as a pet. Ernie Hudson also stars. Jack Colvin does not appear.
24	14	"Haunted"	John McPherson	Story by : Karen Harris & Jill Sherman; Teleplay by : Andrew Schneider	February 7, 1979
Mover David 'Barrett' helps a woman (Carol Baxter) renovate her family's old house in New Hampshire, but strange events start to occur. Jack Colvin does not appear.
25	15	"Mystery Man, Part 1"	Frank Orsatti	Nicholas J. Corea	March 2, 1979
Caught in a car accident on his way to Santa Fe, which badly injures his face and causes amnesia, a bandaged David is befriended by McGee, who's unaware of "John Doe's" real identity. McGee charters a plane to take the pair to a specialist in Los Angeles, but it crashes in a valley, leaving both men stranded as a forest fire approaches. Victoria Carroll and Don Marshal guest star.
26	16	"Mystery Man, Part 2"	Frank Orsatti	Nicholas J. Corea	March 9, 1979
With slowly recovering David and McGee surviving a plane crash forty-eight miles from Eden, Arizona. They are forced to flee a forest fire and avoid a starving Mexican wolf pack. During their escape, David recovers his memory and learns why McGee is obsessed with capturing the Hulk. Michael Payne also stars.
27	17	"The Disciple"	Reza S. Badiyi	Nicholas Corea & James G. Hirsch	March 16, 1979
In a follow-up to "Another Path", David 'Blaine' revisits Li Sung in San Francisco and must help his star pupil Rick Springfield, a young police officer troubled by his father's murder at the hands of a criminal. Gerald McRaney also stars. Jack Colvin does not appear. Note: The episode was a failed backdoor pilot for Springfield.
28	18	"No Escape"	Jeffrey Hayden	Ben Masselink	March 30, 1979
After being arrested for vagrancy in Santa Maria, California, David 'Baron' encounters a mentally ill man (James Wainwright) who believes himself to be Ernest Hemingway. After accidentally freeing the man as the Hulk, David races to save him from hurting himself or others. Sherman Hemsley also stars. Note: Jack Kirby, who co-created the Hulk character, has a cameo as a police sketch artist.
29	19	"Kindred Spirits"	Joseph Pevney	Karen Harris & Jill Sherman	April 6, 1979
David 'Barton' meets a former student, Kim Cattrall, who is working on an archaeological dig on a Navajo reservation in Arizona and has found evidence of a previously Hulk-like creature. Whit Bissell, Chief Dan George, A Martinez, and Don Shanks also star.
30	20	"The Confession"	Barry Crane	Deborah Davis	May 4, 1979
McGee is unwillingly saddled with an inexperienced junior reporter (Markie Post), who discovers and writes a story about Harold Milburn (Barry Gordon), a small, timid computer clerk claiming to be the Hulk in Santa Clara. Meanwhile, David 'Benton' works nearby as a janitor at a medical center. Note: This is the final episode in which the Hulk was voiced by Ted Cassidy, who died on January 16, 1979, from complications following open-heart surgery.
31	21	"The Quiet Room"	Reza S. Badiyi	Karen Harris & Jill Sherman	May 11, 1979
David 'Balland' is working as an orderly at Valley View Sanatorium, when he discovers that the head doctor (Philip Abbott) is performing mind-control experiments on the patients. To keep him quiet, the doctor ordered that David be put in a straitjacket, locked up, and sedated. Note: This is the first episode with Charles Napier voicing the Hulk.
32	22	"Vendetta Road"	John McPherson	Story by : Justin Edgerton; Teleplay by : Justin Edgerton & Michael McGreevey	May 25, 1979
David 'Brennan' encounters a "Bonnie and Clyde"-style couple (Ron Lombard, Christina Hart) in Arkansas, who are enacting an explosive vendetta against a gas company and are pursued by the company’s security chief (Morgan Woodward). Howard Morton also stars.

=== Season 3 (1979–80) ===
No. overall	No. in season	Title	Directed by	Written by	Original release date
33	1	"Metamorphosis"	Alan J. Levi	Story by : Frank Dandridge; Teleplay by : Craig Buck	September 21, 1979
David rescues Lisa Sawn (Mackenzie Phillips), a troubled glam rocker, and her ambitious sister/manager, Jackie (Katherine Cannon). Sensing that David is influencing Lisa, Jackie asks roadie Greg (Gary Graham) to spike David's drink with LSD, triggering a transformation. Note: Graham would star on another of creator Kenneth Johnson's TV series, Alien Nation (1989)
34	2	"Blind Rage"	Jeffrey Hayden	Dan Ullman	September 28, 1979
An accident at a chemical warfare research station sends dry cleaner counterman David 'Blair' on a desperate search for an antidote that will save a young officer's (Tom Stechschulte) life. Lee Bryant and Nicolas Coster also star. Jack Colvin does not appear.
35	3	"Brain Child"	Reza S. Badiyi	Nicholas Corea	October 5, 1979
Fieldworker David 'Barnes' tries to reunite a gifted teenager (Robin Dearden) who has run away from a research institute with the mother (Lynn Carlin) who abandoned her. June Allyson, Joseph Mascolo, and Henry Rowland also star. Jack Colvin does not appear. Note: This episode shares its title with the later Kenneth Johnson-produced series Walker, Texas Ranger.
36	4	"The Slam"	Nicholas Corea	Nicholas Corea	October 19, 1979
David 'Brendan' is arrested for vagrancy and sent to a work camp in Jensen County, where he becomes Prisoner #1124. While there, David witnesses corruption in the prison system by the warden (Marc Alaimo) and the torture of another prisioner (Charles Napier) but can't act to expose him, with McGee nearby.
37	5	"My Favorite Magician"	Reza S. Badiyi	Sam Egan	October 26, 1979
"Jasper the Great" (Ray Walston, Bixby's co-star on My Favorite Martian), an aging magician, drafts fired dishwasher David 'Barker' as his assistant for a benefit performance but has some tricks up his sleeve that could prove to be deadly. Anne Schedeen, Joan Leslie, Robert Alda and Scatman Crothers also star.
38	6	"Jake"	Frank Orsatti	Chuck Bowman	November 2, 1979
While working at a rodeo in Gaston, TX, as a medic, David 'Benton' learns that the show's biggest star, Jake White (L. Q. Jones), is performing with an illness that could cost him his life. James Crittenden, Fred Ward, Jesse Vint and Sandra Kerns also star.
39	7	"Behind the Wheel"	Frank Orsatti	Story by : Rick Rosenthal; Teleplay by : Rick Rosenthal & Todd Susman & Andrew Schneider	November 9, 1979
Coleen Jensen (Esther Rolle), the owner of a Newark taxicab company, is in danger of losing her company to drug-smuggling loan sharks; she turns to taxicab driver David 'Barret' for help.
40	8	"Homecoming"	John McPherson	Andrew Schneider	November 30, 1979
At Thanksgiving, David reluctantly returns to his childhood home in Trevorton, CO, after learning that his father, D.W. Banner (John Marley), may lose his land. Once there, David must fight a crop-destroying plague by helping Helen (Diana Muldaur), his scientist sister, and reconcile with his father. Note: Fred Rogers of Mister Rogers' Neighborhood visited the set of this episode to show his viewers how the series was made and the transformations Lou Ferrigno undergoes to portray the Hulk.
41	9	"The Snare"	Frank Orsatti	Richard Christian Matheson & Thomas E. Szollosi	December 7, 1979
After accepting a ride on a private plane, David 'Bennet' finds himself stranded on a private island off the Florida coast, owned by a wealthy game hunter, Michael Sutton (Bradford Dillman), who hunts men; he greets his discovery of David's Hulk condition as a sign of an even more appealing challenge. Note: This episode is one of many adaptations of Richard Connell's classic short story, The Most Dangerous Game.
42	10	"Babalao"	Richard Milton	Craig Buck	December 14, 1979
Clinic nurse David 'Beckman' helps a young New Orleans doctor (Louise Sorel) battle a con artist (Bill Henderson) posing as a voodoo healer, who has a strong hold on a superstitious community.
43	11	"Captive Night"	Frank Orsatti	Sam Egan	December 21, 1979
While working overtime at Slater's Department Store in Philadelphia, stockroom employee David 'Bishop' confronts sibling thieves (Stanley Kamel, Paul Picerni) who break in to steal the jewels from a safe. where he works. He attempts to win their favor to save his colleagues (Anne Lockhart, Parley Baer). Mark Lenard and Dennis Holahan also star. Jack Colvin does not appear.
44	12	"Broken Image"	John McPherson	Karen Harris & Jill Sherman	January 4, 1980
Apartment caretaker David 'Bowman' is a dead ringer for Mike Cassidy (Bixby in a dual role), a wanted criminal, and becomes the prey of a vengeful gang and the police. His attempt to leave town is hindered by McGee, who is shocked to discover that David Banner is still alive. Karen Carlson also stars.
45	13	"Proof Positive"	Dick Harwood	Karen Harris & Jill Sherman	January 11, 1980
Patricia Steinhauer (Caroline Smith), the Register's new publisher, forbids McGee from continuing his search for the Hulk. He persuades her to join him in Gary, IN, where the Hulk was sighted at a steel mill. Note: Bixby was unavailable for the episode due to scheduling conflicts with court dates related to his divorce. David is portrayed by a stunt double, and Bixby only appears in footage from previous episodes.
46	14	"Sideshow"	Nicholas Corea	Len Jenkin	January 25, 1980
David 'Burns' gets hired as a stage manager for a carnival act and learns that the carnival's mind-reader (Judith Chapman) has been accused of being a jinx by a stalking religious fanatic Robert Donner. Marie Windsor and Allan Rich also star. Jack Colvin does not appear.
47	15	"Long Run Home"	Frank Orsatti	Allan Cole & Chris Bunch	February 1, 1980
Biker Carl Rivers (Paul Koslo) gives David 'Beller' a lift, but the ride takes him straight into the heart of a risky biker gang conflict. Mickey Jones and Robert Tessier also star.
48	16	"Falling Angels"	Barry Crane	Story by : Eric Kaldor & D.K. Krzemien; Teleplay by : Eric Kaldor & D.K. Krzemien and James Sanford Parker	February 8, 1980
While working in a Miami orphanage, handyman David 'Banister' discovers that some of the young inhabitants (Deborah Morgan-Weldon, Cindy Fisher) are being trained as criminals by the manager (Annette Charles) and her boyfriend (Anthony Herrera).
49	17	"The Lottery"	John McPherson	Story by : Dan Ullman; Teleplay by : Allan Cole & Chris Bunch	February 15, 1980
While traveling in Houston, David 'Becker' is hired by an ex-connewsstand vendor, Harry (Robert Hogan), after David thwarts a robbery. David wins $250,000 through a lottery ticket but convinces Harry to collect his winnings without his secret coming to light. Unfortunately, Harry uses the money to set up a con he believes will rake in more money. Peter Breck and Luis Avalos also star.
50	18	"The Psychic"	Barry Crane	Story by : Karen Harris & Jill Sherman and George Arthur Bloom; Teleplay by : Karen Harris & Jill Sherman	February 22, 1980
A young psychic (Brenda Benet, Bixby's wife at the time) in San Francisco has the ability to see the Hulk in grocery store worker David, but she puts him in a tough spot when she also predicts McGee's death at the hands of a killer who killed a teenager.
51	19	"A Rock and a Hard Place"	Chuck Bowman	Andrew Schneider	February 29, 1980
Handyman David 'Braynard' delivers packages for his elderly landlady, Lucy Cash Jeanette Nolan, in Atlantic City, only to be arrested by an aging FBI agent, Preston DeKalb John McIntire, for carrying explosives. DeKalb, discovering that he's Banner, forces David to be their informant, but Lucy, who knows he's the Hulk, shames him into helping with a planned heist. Eric Server als stars. Jack Colvin does not appear.
52	20	"Deathmask"	John McPherson	Nicholas Corea	March 14, 1980
Accused of being a serial killer in the college town of Prestonville, library assistant David 'Brent' is threatened by an enraged lynch mob, an ambitious mayor, (Frank Marth), and a disturbed police chief (Gerald McRaney). Marla Pennington, Lonny Chapman, and Don Marshall guest star.
53	21	"Equinox"	Patrick Boyrivan	Andrew Schneider	March 21, 1980
Librarian David 'Beldon' is trapped at a Vernal Equinox masquerade ball on a private New England island by a spoiled heiress (Christine De Lisle) in the ultimate costume — the Hulk. His appearance gives party crasher McGee the perfect opportunity to use his tranquilizer gun.
54	22	"Nine Hours"	Nicholas Corea	Nicholas Corea	April 4, 1980
In a race against time, orderly David 'Breck' and a disgraced ex-LAPD cop (Marc Alaimo) must outwit a group of hit men to save the lives of a young boy (David Comfort) and a reformed gangster (Frank DeKova). Sheila Larken, Doris Dowling, Phil Rubenstein, and Dennis Haysbert also star. Jack Colvin does not appear.
55	23	"On the Line"	L. Q. Jones	Karen Harris & Jill Sherman	April 11, 1980
After being rescued during a forest fire, David 'Brown' is forced to volunteer by the foreman (Bruce Fairbairn). Sparks ignite when he and a female firefighter (Kathleen Lloyd) are suspected of starting the fires, which become more dangerous. McGee, seeking the Hulk, also joins the volunteers.

=== Season 4 (1980–81) ===
No. overall	No. in season	Title	Directed by	Written by	Original release date
56	1	"Prometheus, Part 1"	Kenneth Johnson	Kenneth Johnson	November 7, 1980
After being exposed to a radioactive meteorite, David finds himself trapped halfway into his metamorphosis to the Hulk while trying to help a young blind woman (Laurie Prange) in Utah. A secret government project, Prometheus, captures David while he's in this state and believes he’s an alien. Note: Bodybuilder and professional wrestler Ric Drasin plays the half-transformed Hulk (uncredited).
57	2	"Prometheus, Part 2"	Kenneth Johnson	Kenneth Johnson	November 14, 1980
Still trapped in mid-transformation, David is an unwitting subject of study by government scientists (Whit Bissell, Arthur Rosenberg, Carol Baxter) at a secret research facility in Colorado. McGee tries to convince them he is not an alien but the Hulk.
58	3	"Free Fall"	Reza S. Badiyi	Chris Bunch & Allan Cole	November 21, 1980
Working for a traveling skydiving show, David 'Blake' finds himself caught up in a conflict between the owner and a corrupt politician, which leads him to fall 12,000 feet (3,700 m)--without a parachute.
59	4	"Dark Side"	John McPherson	Nicholas Corea	December 5, 1980
David 'Bernard's' self-experiments backfire and send him into a primitive state, creating danger for the family with whom he is boarding.
60	5	"Deep Shock"	Reza S. Badiyi	Ruel Fischman	December 12, 1980
During an accident at a power plant that he works at, David 'Benton' is subjected to electrical trauma that allows him to foresee events in the immediate future. In addition at the time when some employees are getting layoffs, David befriends a co-worker with a heart condition. Guest stars: Sharon Acker and Edward Power (Love Is a Many Splendored Thing)
61	6	"Bring Me the Head of the Hulk"	Bill Bixby	Allan Cole & Chris Bunch	January 9, 1981
David 'Bedford' falls for an elaborate trap set to kill the Hulk orchestrated by a mercenary Le Font who is working for the publisher of the National Register's competition named Neil Hines (Laurence Haddon). David receives help from an unlikely ally. Note: This is Sandy McPeak's second guest appearance in the series.
62	7	"Fast Lane"	Frank Orsatti	Reuben Leder	January 16, 1981
David 'Brendan' drives a car from Los Angeles to New York, not realizing that it contains hidden mob money that two sets of desperate criminals will do anything to get. Note: This is Dick O'Neill's first of two appearances in the series. Victoria Carroll makes her final of three appearances.
63	8	"Goodbye, Eddie Cain"	Jack Colvin	Nicholas Corea	January 23, 1981
Eddie Cain (Cameron Mitchell), a Los Angeles private detective, pegs David 'Benedict' as the prime suspect in a blackmailing case. Once his innocence is proven, the two join forces to find the real culprit. Jack Colvin does not appear.
64	9	"King of the Beach"	Barry Crane	Karen Harris	February 6, 1981
Carl Molino (Ferrigno in a dual role), a struggling restaurant worker and bodybuilder, befriends fellow worker David 'Bennet ' and enters a "King of the Beach" contest by a small-time hustler (Leslie Ackerman). Carl doesn't realize how unscrupulous competitors are. Charlie Brill and Ken Waller also star.
65	10	"Wax Museum"	Dick Harwood	Carol Baxter	February 13, 1981
The Hulk feels right at home with the bizarre exhibits in a wax museum when David 'Beckwith' takes a job there, but a shifty relative (Max Showalter) is drugging his niece, the owner (Christine Belford), to sell the museum.
66	11	"East Winds"	Jack Colvin	Jill Sherman	February 20, 1981
While living in the Chinatown part of San Francisco, a baffled David 'Barrett' finds himself the unwilling recipient of a mail-order bride seeking something hidden in his apartment, dragging him and his landlady into a standoff between the Chinese Mafia and a gruff beat cop.
67	12	"The First, Part 1"	Frank Orsatti	Andrew Schneider	March 6, 1981
After hearing a legend about another Hulk, David 'Barr' searches in the town of Vissaria for Dr. Jeffrey Clive, the scientist who could have discovered an antidote for his condition. Instead, he meets the widow Elizabeth Collins (Lola Albright) fiance of Dr. Clive, he also meets Dell Frye (Harry Townes), a bitter old man who had once been a Hulk and wants the power back. Guest stars: Billy Green Bush as Sheriff Carl Decker Lola Albright as Elizabeth Collins
68	13	"The First, Part 2"	Frank Orsatti	Andrew Schneider	March 13, 1981
With David's unwitting aid, Frye uses the lab equipment to regain his Hulk power; but his bitter and murderous personality makes his creature (Dick Durock) extremely dangerous, then Elizabeth Collins (Lola Albright) worries about the situation of her employee Dell Frye and David can only hope there's enough of Dr. Clive's cure left for both of them. McGee arrives thinking Frye is the Hulk he has been chasing. Guest stars: Billy Green Bush as Sheriff Carl Decker Lola Albright as Elizabeth Collins Edward Walsh as Brad Wheeler Carl Ciarfalio as Brad's friend (uncredited)
69	14	"The Harder They Fall"	Mike Vejar	Nancy Faulkner	March 27, 1981
Paralyzed from the waist down after an auto accident, a torn David 'Blackwell' must weigh up accepting life in a wheelchair or whether to risk intentionally transforming into the Hulk whose incredible regenerative ability may repair the damage. Note: This is Denny Miller's second guest appearance in the series.
70	15	"Interview with the Hulk"	Patrick Boyriven	Alan Cassidy	April 3, 1981
Tracked down in Atlanta by a respected science reporter named Emerson Fletcher (Michael Conrad) who realizes his true identity, construction worker David 'Butler' reluctantly agrees to an interview about the Hulk unaware that the now disgraced and desperate reporter is reduced to working for the National Register and that Jack McGee is hot on his trail. Guest stars: Jan Sterling and Walter Brooke
71	16	"Half Nelson"	Barry Crane	Andrew Schneider	April 17, 1981
David 'Benley' befriends Buster Caldwell (Tommy Madden), a dwarf wrestler in Baltimore, but a couple of crime syndicate enforcers could get in their way. Guest stars: Elaine Joyce and H.B. Haggerty (who was a wrestler before he became an actor)
72	17	"Danny"	Mark A. Burley	Diane Frolov	May 15, 1981
David 'Bentzen' tries to help a young widow and her baby get away from a living with a criminal hick brother in law. Guest stars: Don Stroud and Robin Dearden
73	18	"Patterns"	Nick Havinga	Reuben Leder	May 22, 1981
David 'Benson' is working for a New York clothes manufacturer who's banking everything on his daughter's fashion show. A couple of loan sharks start using force to get their money back. The owner, named Sam Brandes (Eddie Barth), claims David is his business partner. It is up to the Hulk to deal with the loan sharks who come calling for cash.

=== Season 5 (1981–82) ===
No. overall	No. in season	Title	Directed by	Written by	Original release date
74	1	"The Phenom"	Bernard McEveety	Reuben Leder	October 2, 1981
David 'Bedecker' catches a ride to Florida with a promising young baseball pitcher, but it will take the strength of the Hulk to protect the young man from the dangers of an unscrupulous agent. Guest stars: Brett Cullen (Narcos), Anne Lockhart and Robert Donner. Dick O'Neill makes his second of two appearances.
75	2	"Two Godmothers"	Mike Vejar	Reuben Leder	October 9, 1981
A special delivery makes for an amazing escape when laundry truck driver David 'Bradley' is forced to help three prisoners from a women's prison including one who is nine months pregnant.
76	3	"Veteran"	Mike Vejar	Story by : Nicholas Corea; Teleplay by : Reuben Leder and Nicholas Corea	October 16, 1981
David 'Barnes' anonymity is put in jeopardy when he tries to stop a disturbed man named Doug Hewitt (Paul Koslo) from assassinating a prominent politician named Harrison Cole (Bruce Gray) who was a former Vietnam War veteran.
77	4	"Sanctuary"	Chuck Bowman	Deborah Davis	November 6, 1981
While working as a caretaker at a convent, David Banner finds himself on a mission with a higher purpose when he impersonates a priest in order to save a young immigrant from some greedy smugglers. Guest stars: Diana Muldaur and Edie McClurg
78	5	"Triangle"	Mike Vejar	Andrew Schneider	November 13, 1981
Romance puts lumberjack David 'Beller' in a shaky situation when he competes with a powerful lumber baron for the attention of a beautiful local girl. Notes: Charles Napier makes his second guest appearance. Mickey Jones makes his third appearance. Jack McGee's last appearance in the series.
79	6	"Slaves"	John A. Liberti	Jeri Taylor	May 5, 1982
Exposing the Hulk may be the only option for escape when David 'Becker' is captured by an embittered ex-convict and imprisoned in an abandoned ghost town. Guest star: Jeffrey Kramer (Jaws)
80	7	"A Minor Problem"	Michael Preece	Diane Frolov	May 12, 1982
David 'Bradshaw' is in a race against time when he arrives in Rocksprings, an eerily deserted town that has been contaminated by a deadly bacterium. When he is also infected, David must find an antidote to cure himself and everyone in Rocksprings. Note: This is the final episode in which Charles Napier voices the Hulk. Guest star: Linden Chiles

=== Reunion movies (1988–90) ===
Title	Directed by	Written by	Original release date
The Incredible Hulk Returns	Nicholas Corea	Nicholas Corea	May 22, 1988
It's been two years since his last transformation and David "Banion" has developed a new gamma transponder at the Joshua-Lambert institute that he hopes will cure him of his inner monster forever. But when a former student unearths the frozen tomb of an ancient Norse God, the Mighty Thor is unleashed upon 20th century society. Both Hulk and Thor initially clash, but later become allies to save both the transponder and the woman Banner loves. Note: This is the first telemovie with Lou Ferrigno voicing the Hulk himself.
The Trial of the Incredible Hulk	Bill Bixby	Gerald Di Pego	May 7, 1989
While trying to stop a subway mugging, David "Belson" is arrested for assault and is defended by blind attorney Matt Murdock. But when the Hulk goes berserk and breaks out of jail, Murdock reveals his own secret to Banner: blinded by toxic radiation, he protects the city as the super-sensory acrobatic crimefighter Daredevil. David and Murdock join forces to defeat an international crime syndicate led by Wilson Fisk.
The Death of the Incredible Hulk	Bill Bixby	Gerald Di Pego	February 18, 1990
Continuing in the attempt to rid himself of his savage alter ego, janitor David "Bellamey" sneaks into a government research lab run by Dr. Ronald Pratt hoping to find a solution. When Pratt discovers David's plight, he offers to help, but a beautiful spy who's out to steal Pratt's research for terrorists forces Banner to choose between love and loyalty, good and evil, and ultimately, life and death.
