= Alice Henderson =

Alice Henderson may refer to:

- Alice Corbin Henderson (1881–1949), American poet
- Alice Henderson (novelist), American novelist
- Alice Wonder Land (born Alice Henderson), American pop singer
- Alice Henderson (River City), fictional character
- Alice Henderson, fictional character in 1969 film Bob & Carol & Ted & Alice
