= Andrew Henderson =

Andrew or Andy Henderson may refer to:

- A. A. Henderson (Andrew Augustus Henderson, 1816–1875), navy surgeon and specimen collector
- Andrew Henderson (writer) (died 1775), Scottish writer
- Andrew Henderson (portrait painter) (1783–1835), Scottish portrait painter
- Andrew Henderson (schoolmaster) (1797–1869), school teacher in Nova Scotia, Canada
- Andrew Kennaway Henderson (1879–1960), New Zealand clerk, illustrator, cartoonist, editor and pacifist
- Andrew Henderson (English cricketer) (born 1941), former English cricketer
- Andrew Henderson (Scottish cricketer) (1922–2020), Scottish cricketer
- Andrew Henderson (botanist) (born 1950), English-born palm systematist
- Andrew Henderson (rugby league) (born 1979), English rugby league footballer
- Andrew Henderson (rugby union) (born 1980), Scottish rugby union footballer
- Andy Henderson (soccer) (born 19??), Australian football (soccer) player and coach
- Andy Henderson (Scottish footballer) (active 1914–1919), Scottish football goalkeeper
- Andy Henderson (EastEnders)
