= Fenderson =

Fenderson is a surname.

== List of people with the surname ==
- Grace Baxter Fenderson (1883–1962), American educator and clubwoman
- James Fenderson (born 1976), former American football player
- Reginald Fenderson (1911–1968), American actor
- Tim Fenderson, American musician

== See also ==
- Henderson (surname)
- Fanderson
