= David Henderson =

David Henderson may refer to:

== Academy ==
- David Henderson (philosopher) (born 1954), American philosopher
- David Henderson (psychiatrist) (1884–1965), Scottish psychiatrist
- David W. Henderson (1939–2018), American professor of mathematics
- David Willis Wilson Henderson (1903–1968), Scottish microbiologist, director of MRE, Porton Down

== Economics ==
- David Henderson (economist) (1927–2018), chief economist at the OECD in Paris from 1984 to 1992
- David R. Henderson (born 1950), American economist

== Journalism ==
- David Henderson (broadcaster) (born 1970), Scottish journalist/newsreader working for BBC Scotland
- David Henderson (American journalist), CBS Network News television and radio journalist

== Politics ==
- David B. Henderson (1840–1906), U.S. politician of the 1890s and 1900s
- David Henderson (Canadian politician) (1841–1922), Canadian member of parliament
- David N. Henderson (1921–2004), U.S. representative from North Carolina

== Sports ==
- David Henderson (footballer) (1868–1933), Scottish football player (Liverpool FC)
- David C. Henderson (born c. 1917), American football player and coach of football and basketball
- David Henderson (footballer, born 1918), (1918-1982), Scottish footballer, see List of Bury F.C. players (1–24 appearances)
- Dave Henderson (ice hockey) (born 1952), Canadian-born French ice hockey coach and player
- Dave Henderson (1958–2015), Major League Baseball player
- Dave Henderson (footballer) (born 1960), retired Irish football goalkeeper
- David Henderson (basketball) (born 1964), former Duke co-captain and head basketball coach at University of Delaware

== Others ==
- David Henderson (British Army officer) (1862–1921), senior British Army and, later, RAF officer
- David Ezekiel Henderson (1879–1968), U.S. federal judge
- David Henderson (poet) (1942–2026), poet associated with the Umbra workshop and Black Arts Movement
- Davy Henderson (born c. 1962), Scottish musician, The Fire Engines, Win, The Nectarine No. 9
- David Henderson (property developer), property developer in New Zealand
- David Henderson, English pilot and businessman prosecuted for his role in the 2019 English Channel Piper PA-46 crash
