= Gavin McKiddie =

Scottish cricketer (1940–2025)

Personal information
- Full name: Gavin Thomson McKiddie
- Born: 17 May 1940; Forfar, Angus, Scotland
- Died: 29 October 2025 (aged 85); Broughty Ferry, Dundee, Angus, Scotland
- Batting: Right-handed
- Bowling: Right-arm off break

Domestic team information
- Years: Team
- 1977: Scotland

Career statistics
Competition	First-class
Matches	1
Runs scored	10
Batting average	5.00
100s/50s	0/0
Top score	8
Balls bowled	78
Wickets	2
Bowling average	20.50
5 wickets in innings	0
10 wickets in match	0
Best bowling	1/3
Catches/stumpings	1/–
- Source: Cricinfo, 24 July 2022

Gavin Thomson McKiddie (17 May 1940 – 29 October 2025) was a Scottish first-class cricketer.

== Biography ==
McKiddie was born in Forfar on 17 May 1940, where he was educated at Forfar Academy. A club cricketer for Strathmore Cricket Club, McKiddie made a single appearance for Scotland in first-class cricket against Ireland at Dublin in 1977; he had been called up to the Scotland squad as a last minute injury replacement for the Scottish captain George Goddard. Batting twice in the match at the tail, he was dismissed for 8 runs in the Scottish first innings by John Elder, while in their second innings he was dismissed for two runs by the same bowler. He took two wickets with his off break bowling, dismissing Irish captain Alec O'Riordan in their first innings and Dermott Monteith in their second innings. Outside of cricket, McKiddie was a quantity surveyor. McKiddie died at home in Broughty Ferry, on 29 October 2025, at the age of 85.
