= Stonewall Jackson and the American Civil War =

- Cover of 2006 edition published by Barnes & Noble, Inc.
- Author: George Francis Robert Henderson
- Language: English
- Subject: Stonewall Jackson; American Civil War; United States history
- Genre: Military biography Military history
- Publisher: London, New York, Longmans, Green and Co.
- Publication date: 1898
- Publication place: United Kingdom
- English publication date: 1898
- Media type: Hardcover, softcover
- Pages: 779
- ISBN: 0-7607-7954-6
- OCLC: 417700340
- Dewey Decimal: 973.73092 B 22
- LC Class: E467.1.J15 H55 2006

Stonewall Jackson and the American Civil War is an 1898 biography of Confederate States Army general Stonewall Jackson, including his actions during the American Civil War. Written by British Army officer and author George Francis Robert Henderson, it became Henderson's most well-known work. The book chronicles Jackson's life, beginning with his education at the United States Military Academy and the Virginia Military Institute, to his role in the 1862 Jackson's Valley campaign, as a corps commander in the Army of Northern Virginia under Robert E. Lee and up to his death after the Battle of Chancellorsville in 1863. The twenty-five chapter work took eight years to complete and was first printed in two volumes, but since has been reprinted several times with most copies available as one complete book.

== Reprints and versions ==
The original version of this work was published in 1898 by London, New York, Longmans, Green and Co. It came in two volumes and contained 33 individual maps. The next published version came in 1900 from the same press, also in two volumes, and included an introduction by Field Marshal Viscount Wolseley. Two exact reprints of the original would follow in 1911 and 1919 (after Henderson's death in 1903), both also by the same publisher. Next would be three reprints of the work with the introduction by Viscount Wolseley (after his death) in 1926, January 1936, and July 1937, all again by the same press. However, the 1926 edition would be the last to be split into two volumes.

== Chapters ==
- I. West Point (p. 1)
- II. Mexico (p. 21)
- III. Lexington, 1851–1861 (p. 47)
- IV. Secession, 1860–61 (p. 67)
- V. Harper's Ferry (p. 88)
- VI. The Battle Of Manassas Or Bull Run (p. 115)
- VII. Romney (p. 146)
- VIII. Kernstown (p. 185)
- IX. M'Dowell (p. 225)
- X. Winchester (p. 260)
- XI. Cross Keys And Port Republic (p. 304)
- XII. Review Of The Valley Campaign (p. 344)
- XIII. The Seven Days. Gaines' Mill (p. 380)
- XIV. The Seven Days. Frayer's Farm And Malvern Mill (p. 415)
- XV. Cedar Run (p. 422)
- XVI. Groveton And The Second Manassas (470)
- XVII. The Second Manassas (Continued) (p. 521)
- XVIII. Harpers Ferry (p. 547)
- XIX. Sharpsburg (p. 580)
- XX. Fredericksburg (p. 622)
- XXI. The Army of Northern Virginia (p. 666)
- XXII. Winter Quarters (p. 700)
- XXIII. Chancellorsville (p. 720)
- XXIV. Chancellorsville (Continued) (p. 741)
- XXV. The Soldier And The Man (p. 779)
