= Paul Henderson (disambiguation) =

Paul Henderson (born 1943) is a Canadian former ice hockey player and member of Canada's Sports Hall of Fame.

Paul Henderson may also refer to:

- Paul Henderson (sprinter) (born 1971), Australian sprinter
- Paul Henderson (cricketer) (born 1974), English cricketer
- Paul Henderson (soccer) (born 1976), Australian football goalkeeper
- Paul Henderson (journalist) (1939–2018), winner of the 1982 Pulitzer Prize for Investigative Reporting
- Paul Henderson (photojournalist) (1899–1988), African-American photojournalist for the Baltimore Afro-American newspaper
- Paul Henderson (politician) (born 1962), former Chief Minister of the Australian Northern Territory
- Paul Henderson (rugby union) (born 1964), New Zealand rugby union player
- Paul Henderson (sailor) (born 1934), Canadian sailor and member of the Canadian Olympic Hall of Fame
- Paul Henderson (basketball) (born 1956), American-French professional basketball player
- Paul Henderson, lead vocalist for the 1980s Canadian band The Front
