= Peter Henderson =

Peter Henderson may refer to:

- Peter Henderson (Australian public servant) (1928–2016), Secretary of the Australian Government Department of Foreign Affairs 1979 to 1984
- Peter Henderson, Baron Henderson of Brompton (1922–2000), British public servant
- Peter Henderson (cricketer) (1965–2010), Australian cricketer
- Peter Henderson (footballer) (born 1952), English footballer
- Peter Henderson (sportsman) (1926–2014), New Zealand athlete and rugby player
- Peter Henderson (music producer) (born 1955), British record producer and audio engineer
- Peter Lyle Barclay Henderson (1848–1912), Scottish architect
- Pete Henderson (1895–1940), Canadian racing driver

== See also ==
- Henderson (surname)
