= Forfar Academy =

School in Forfar Angus, Scotland, UK

Coordinates: 56.65284°N 2.89464°W

Forfar Academy is a comprehensive school serving the community in and around the market town of Forfar, Angus, Scotland.

In 2019, Forfar Academy was ranked 251 out of 339 secondary schools in Scotland for pupils achieving 5 highers or more.

== History ==
Forfar Academy traces its origins to 1815, when a new school building was completed on Academy Street, Forfar, Angus. The school was designed by the local architect, David Logan, in the Greek Revival style. The style, which included Doric columns and other classical features, was chosen to evoke the classical tradition of learning.

== Notable former pupils ==
- J. M. Barrie
- James Henderson, cricketer
- Gavin McKiddie, cricketer

== Bibliography ==
- Jack, R. D. S. (2014) [2004]. "Barrie, Sir James Matthew, baronet (1860–1937)". Oxford Dictionary of National Biography (online ed.). Oxford University Press. doi:10.1093/ref:odnb/30617. (Subscription, Wikipedia Library access or UK public library membership required.)
- "Forfar Academy, Angus: Use and Adaption of Listed Schools". Historic Environment Scotland. 2019.
- "Forfar Community Campus". www.robertson.co.uk.
