= Frank Henderson =

Frank Henderson may refer to:

- Frank Henderson (cricketer) (1908–1954), Australian cricketer
- Frank Henderson (poker player) (1931–2015), American poker player
- Frank Henderson (public servant) (1911–1969), Australian public servant
- Frank Henderson (Scottish politician) (1836–1889), Scottish Liberal politician
- Frank Henderson (South Dakota politician) (1928–2012), American politician from South Dakota
- Frank Henderson (Idaho politician) (1922–2015), Republican Idaho state representative
- Frank Henderson (footballer) (1900–1966), English football left half
- Frank Henderson (Irish revolutionary) (1886–1959), captain in the Irish Volunteers
