= Hendrie =

Hendrie is a surname of the Scottish Clan Henderson.

Notable people with a Hendrie surname include:

- Anita Hendrie (1863–1940), American actress
- Bill Hendrie (1884–1939), Australian rules footballer
- Craig Hendrie (born 1974), Australian rules footballer
- Charles Hendrie (1886–?), Australian cricketer
- Dick Hendrie (1895–1964), Scottish footballer
- Gilbert "Gil" Hendrie (1901–1968), Australian rules footballer
- Herbert Hendrie (1887–1946), British stained glass artist
- Joseph Hendrie (1925–2023), American physicist, chairman of the U.S. Nuclear Regulatory Commission (NRC)
- John Strathearn Hendrie (1857–1923), former Lieutenant Governor of Ontario
- John Hendrie (Scottish footballer) (born 1963), Scottish former footballer
- John Hendrie (Australian footballer) (born 1953), Australian footballer
- Kelvin Hendrie (1898–1953), Scottish international rugby union player
- Lee Hendrie (born 1977), English footballer
- Luke Hendrie (born 1994), English footballer
- Margaret Hendrie (1935–1990), writer of the lyrics to Nauru's national anthem
- Paul Hendrie (born 1954), Scottish former footballer
- Phil Hendrie (born 1952), U.S. radio host
- Stephen Hendrie (born 1995), Scottish footballer
- Stuart Hendrie (born 1989), English footballer
- Rae Hendrie (born 1977), Scottish actress
- Tom Hendrie (born 1955), Scottish former professional football player and manager

== See also ==
- Hendry
