= Thomas Henderson =

Thomas Henderson may refer to:

== Law and politics ==
- Thomas Henderson (New Jersey politician) (1743–1824), American politician
- Thomas Henderson (New Zealand politician) (1810–1886), New Zealand politician
- Thomas J. Henderson (politician) (1824–1911), United States Congressman from Illinois
- Tom Henderson (Labour politician) (1867–1960), Scottish Labour Cooperative politician
- Thomas Henderson (Liberal politician) (1874–1951), Scottish Liberal MP for Roxburghshire and Selkirkshire
- Tommy Henderson (Thomas Gibson Henderson, 1887–1970), Independent Unionist politician from Belfast

== Sports ==
=== Association football (soccer) ===
- Tommy Henderson (footballer, born 1902) (1902–?), English footballer
- Tommy Henderson (footballer, born 1927) (1927–2013), English professional footballer
- Tommy Henderson (footballer, born 1943), Scottish professional footballer
- Tommy Henderson (footballer, born 1949), English professional footballer

=== Other sports ===
- Thomas Henderson (cricketer) (1875–1920), English cricketer and surgeon
- Tom Henderson (basketball) (born 1952), American professional basketball player
- Thomas Henderson (American football) (born 1953), American NFL football player

== Others ==
- Thomas Henderson (astronomer) (1798–1844), first Astronomer Royal for Scotland
- Thomas Finlayson Henderson (1844–1923), British historian, often credited as T. F. Henderson
- Thomas J. Henderson (activist) (1931–2005), American activist and construction business manager
