= Charles Henderson =

Charles Henderson may refer to:

== Politicians ==
- Charles Henderson (Alabama politician) (1860–1937), American politician, governor of Alabama, 1915–1919
- Charles Henderson (Nevada politician) (1873–1954), U.S. senator from Nevada
- Charles Henderson (Canadian politician) (1883–1957), Canadian member of parliament
- Charles P. Henderson (1911–1990), mayor of Youngstown, Ohio

== Scientists ==
- Charles Richmond Henderson (1848–1915), American sociologist
  - SS Charles Henderson, a Liberty ship constructed during World War II
- Charles Roy Henderson (1911–1989), American animal geneticist

== Other ==
- Charles E. Henderson (1907–1970), American songwriter and composer
- Charles Henderson (historian) (1900–1933), British historian and antiquarian of Cornwall
- Charles Henderson (bishop) (1924–2006), Irish-born British Roman Catholic bishop
- Charles W. Henderson (born 1948), author of books about Marine Corps sniper Carlos Hathcock and Vietnam
- Charles Henderson (American football) (born 1946), former head football coach of Delaware State University
- Charles Cooper Henderson (1803–1877), British painter of horses and coaches
- Charles Henderson (character), fictional character in the Henderson's Boys and CHERUB series
- Charles Hanford Henderson (1861–1941), American educator and author
- Charles Henderson (weightlifter) (1922–2019), Australian weightlifter
- Charles Ferdinand Henderson (1866–1935), Royal Navy and Royal Australian Navy officer
- Charles Henderson, 3rd Baron Faringdon (born 1937), British peer, stockbroker and courtier
- Charlie Henderson (1870–?), English footballer
- Charles Henderson, organist and choirmaster of St. George's Church from 1955–?, New York City
- Charles Arlin Leon Henderson, American child who disappeared, see disappearance of Charles Arlin Henderson

== See also ==
- C. H. Yoakum (Charles Henderson Yoakum, 1849–1909), U.S. representative from Texas
