= The Overton Window =

2010 novel

- Author: Glenn Beck
- Language: English
- Subject: Fictional story about the U.S. under attack
- Genre: Political thriller novel
- Publisher: Threshold Editions
- Publication date: June 15, 2010
- Publication place: United States of America
- Pages: 336
- ISBN: 978-1-4391-8430-1

The Overton Window is a political thriller by political commentator Glenn Beck. The book, written with the assistance of contributing writers, was released on June 15, 2010.

== Plot ==
The novel is based on Joseph Overton's Overton window concept in political theory, in which at any given moment there is a range of policies related to any particular issue that is considered politically acceptable ("in the window"), and other policies that politicians seeking to gain or hold public office do not feel they can recommend without being considered too far outside the mainstream ("outside the window"). Moving the window would make previously radical ideas seem reasonable. Beck has referred to the book as "faction" – fiction based on facts.

The plot revolves around a man named Noah Gardner, a public relations executive who has no interest in politics. He changes his mind when he meets a woman, Molly Ross, who is "consumed by the knowledge that the United States we know is about to be lost forever," an idea Gardner dismisses as a conspiracy theory. After the United States comes under attack, however, he works to expose the conspirators behind the attack.

== Reception ==
The Washington Post's review criticized the book's "laughable prose", and concluded that the book's success would be measured "not by its literary value (none), or its contribution to the thriller genre (small), or the money it rakes in (considerable), but rather by the rebelliousness it incites among anti-government extremists. If the book is found tucked into the ammo boxes of self-proclaimed patriots and recited at "tea party" assemblies, then Beck will have achieved his goal."

The Time review by Alex Altman was mostly critical, complimenting aspects of the book's likely ability to satisfy its audience as either a dime-store romance or an ideological message vehicle, while faulting its insufficient suspense as a thriller, terming the book "plodding" with a "half-baked plot" over-burdened with its "sermonizing."

When it was released on June 15, the novel debuted at number one in its first week on the New York Times Best Seller List, and remained on the bestseller list through September of that year. National Review also pointed to the book's influence in providing attention to Joseph Overton's Mackinac Center for Public Policy, a free market think tank where Overton was a vice president until 2003.

Writer Chris Kelly has suggested that ghostwriter Jack Henderson repurposed the plot for Overton Window from one of Henderson's previous novels, Circumference of Darkness.

== Sequel ==
Eye of Moloch, a sequel, was released in June 2013.

== Reviews ==
- "Glenn Beck's paranoid thriller, 'The Overton Window'" at The Washington Post
- "Book Review: 'The Overton Window' by Glenn Beck" at The Los Angeles Times
- "Glenn Beck's Novel: Liberty and Romance for All" at Time
- "Glenn Beck's New Novel About Liberals Staging 9/11 Is a Lot Like a 2005 Novel About Conservatives Staging 9/11" at The Huffington Post
- "The Overton Window, 100-Part Review" at Mediaite
