= Charles Ferdinand Henderson =

Royal Navy Admiral (1866–1935)

Admiral Charles Ferdinand Henderson (7 March 1866 – 15 July 1935) was a Royal Navy and Royal Australian Navy officer.

Born in York, Henderson was the son of William George Henderson, Dean of Carlisle and the brother was Colonel George Francis Robert Henderson. The family had strong naval connections: his grandfather was Admiral George Henderson, himself the son of John Henderson, a long-time secretary of Admiral the Viscount Bridport, whilst an uncle was Rear-Admiral Samuel Hood Henderson.

After attending Leeds Grammar School, he entered HMS Britannia as a cadet in 1878.
