= Caroline Henderson =

Caroline Henderson may refer to:

- Caroline Henderson (singer) (born 1962), Danish–Swedish pop and jazz singer
- Caroline Henderson (journalist) (born 1985), Scottish broadcast journalist
- Caroline Henderson (author) (1877–1966), American farmer and writer
- Caroline Henderson Griffiths (1861–1937), née Henderson, American diplomat's wife and philanthropist
