= William Henderson =

William, Willie, Bill or Billy Henderson may refer to:

== Musicians ==
- Willie Henderson (musician) (born 1941), American soul music composer, arranger, producer
- Bill Henderson (performer) (1926–2016), American jazz vocalist and actor
- Bill Henderson (Canadian singer) (born 1944), Canadian singer, songwriter and music producer
- Billy Henderson (American singer) (1939–2007), vocalist with The Spinners

== Public officials ==
- William Henderson, 1st Baron Henderson (1891–1984), English Labour legislator
- William L. Henderson (1894–1984), American judge
- William Henderson (Canadian politician) (1916–2006), Canadian politician and judge
- Bill Henderson (Northern Ireland politician) (1924–2010), Ulster journalist, television executive, politician
- William J. Henderson (born 1947), American Postmaster General, Netflix executive
- Bill Henderson (Isle of Man legislator) (born 1961), Manx legislator
- Bill Henderson (Wyoming politician), American member of the Wyoming House of Representatives
- William B. Henderson, North Carolina legislator

== Sports people ==
- William Henderson (American football) (born 1971), fullback, TV football commentator
- Martin Henderson (footballer) (William Martin Neville Henderson, born 1956), Scottish forward
- Bill Henderson (baseball manager) (1857–1929), American MLB manager
- Willie Henderson (born 1944), Scottish winger
- Bill Henderson (pitcher) (1901–1966), American pitcher
- Bill Henderson (footballer, born 1878) (1878–1945), Scottish full back
- William Henderson (footballer, born 1883) (1883–?), Scottish left half
- Bill Henderson (footballer, born 1898) (1898–1964), Scottish forward
- Bill Henderson (footballer, born 1899) (1899–1934), English outside right
- Bill Henderson (soccer) (born 1929), Australian goalkeeper
- Bill Henderson (Australian rules footballer) (1887–1956), footballer for Richmond and Melbourne
- Billy Henderson (footballer) (1900–1934), English right back
- Billy Henderson (coach) (1928–2018), American football player and coach
- Bill Henderson (coach) (1901–1979), American basketball coach
- William Henderson (cricketer) (1917–1995), South African cricketer
- Bill Henderson (curler), Scottish curler
- William Henderson (sport shooter) (born 1929), sports shooter
- Bill Henderson (sprinter) (born 1929), Scottish sprinter

== Writers ==
- Bill Henderson (novelist) (born 1943), American author
- Bill Henderson (publisher) (born 1941), American author, editor and publisher
- William James Henderson (1855–1937), American journalist and music critic

== Military ==
- William Henderson (Royal Navy officer) (1788–1854), British admiral
- William Hannam Henderson (1845–1931), British admiral, founding editor of Naval Review
- William Henderson (general) (1919–1995), Australian Army officer

== Others ==
- William Henderson (physician) (1810–1872), Scottish doctor
- William Henderson (priest) (1819–1905), Dean of Carlisle
- William G. Henderson (1882–1922), co-founder, Henderson Motorcycle and Ace Motorcycle Companies
- William Henderson (1766–1842), co-founder of Scottish Widows
- William Henderson (landscape gardener), English landscape designer (1825–1866)
- William Henderson (philanthropist) (1826–1904), Scottish shipping merchant, builder of Royal Infirmary
- William Henderson (architect) (1837–1931), Scottish-born architect in Canada
- William Penhallow Henderson (1877–1943), American painter, architect, and furniture designer
- William Williams Henderson (1879–1944), American Mormon educator
- William MacGregor Henderson (1913–2000), Scottish veterinary expert

== Characters ==
- Inspector William Henderson, American police official in Superman

== See also ==
- William Henderson Franklin (1852–1935), American educator, minister, journalist, and school founder
- Henderson (surname)
