= Jock Henderson =

Jock Henderson may refer to:

- Jock Henderson (footballer, born 1871) (1871–1930), Scottish footballer for Celtic, Lincoln City, Leicester Fosse and Small Heath
- Jock Henderson (footballer, born 1895) (1895–1957), Scottish footballer for Manchester City, Southend United, Gillingham and Dunfermline Athletic

== See also ==
- John Henderson (disambiguation)
