= Mark Henderson =

Mark Henderson may refer to:

- Mark Henderson (swimmer) (born 1969), American swimmer
- The snowplow driver during the 1982 NFL game between New England Patriots and the Miami Dolphins; see Snowplow Game
