= Brian Henderson (film theorist) =

American film theorist

- Born: April 17, 1941
- Died: March 1, 2017 (aged 75); Buffalo, New York
- Education: Johns Hopkins University (BA) Harvard University (JD)
- Notable work: A Critique of Film Theory (1980)

Brian Henderson was an American film theorist, author, editor, and educator.

== Life and career ==
In 1962, Henderson graduated with a BA in philosophy from Johns Hopkins University. He received his Juris Doctor from Harvard University in 1965. He earned his PhD in 1973 from the University of California, Santa Cruz.

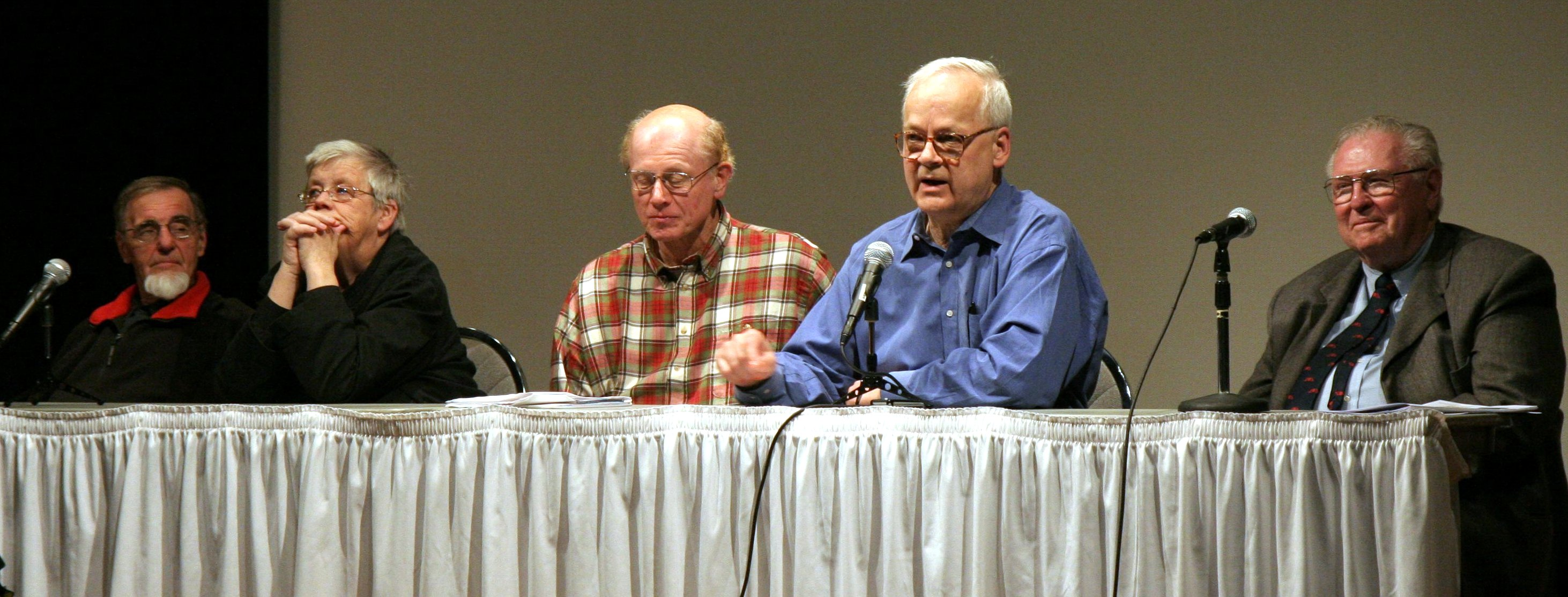
Some of University at Buffalo's Media Study founders, pictured from left to right: Woody and Steina Vasulka, Brian Henderson, Tony Conrad, Gerald O'Grady

Henderson taught film at San Francisco State University for a year before joining the University at Buffalo faculty in 1974. At the University at Buffalo, Henderson was one of the founders of the Center for Media Study, now Department of Media Study, alongside Gerald O'Grady, James Blue, Tony Conrad, Hollis Frampton, Paul Sharits, and Woody and Steina Vasulka. Henderson was the Department of Media Study chair twice before retiring in 2010.

Henderson's published works include Critique of Film Theory (1980). He also wrote and edited for Film Quarterly.

Henderson served as an intelligence officer during the Vietnam War for the United States Army.
