= Edward Henderson =

Edward Henderson may refer to:

- Ed Henderson (1884–1964), American baseball pitcher
- Edward Henderson (archdeacon) (1916–1997), archdeacon of Pontefract, 1968–1981
- Edward Henderson (bishop) (1910–1986), Bishop of Bath and Wells, 1960–1975, son of the dean
- Edward Henderson (dean) (1873–1947), priest in the Church of England, dean of St Albans, and of Salisbury
- Edward Elers Delaval Henderson (1878–1917), British recipient of the Victoria Cross
- Edward F. Henderson (1917–1995), British diplomat

== See also ==
- Eddie Henderson (disambiguation), several people
- Edmund Henderson (1821–1896), head of London Metropolitan Police
- Edwin Henderson (1883–1977), American educator and NAACP pioneer
- Edwin Hubert Henderson (1885–1939), chief architect of the Commonwealth of Australia, 1929–1939
