= Marie Therese Henderson =

Scottish music director and composer

Marie Thérèse Henderson is a Scottish music director and composer. She teaches at the Sophia University Institute of the Focolare Movement. She is linked to the music group Gen Verde.
