= Tommy Henderson (footballer, born 1902) =

English footballer

Personal information
- Full name: Thomas Henderson
- Date of birth: 1902
- Place of birth: Black Callerton, England
- Height: 5 ft 10 in (1.78 m)
- Positions: Right back; left half

Senior career*
Years	Team	Apps	(Gls)
- North Walbottle
1919–1920	Newcastle United	0	(0)
1920	Southampton	0	(0)
- Leadgate Park
- Workington
1923–1924	Ashington	40	(3)
- Annfield Plain
- Wallsend
- * Club domestic league appearances and goals

Thomas Henderson (born 1902) was an English professional footballer who played as a right back and left half in the Football League for Ashington.

== Personal life ==
Henderson served as a private in the Durham Light Infantry during the First World War.
