= David C. Henderson =

American football player and sports coach

Biographical details
- Born: c. 1917; Bedford, Ohio, U.S.

Playing career
- 1938: Wooster
- Position: Quarterback

Coaching career (HC unless noted)

Football
- 1946–1951: Kenyon
- 1952–1953: Allegheny

Basketball
- 1948–1952: Kenyon

Head coaching record
- Overall: 15–40–2 (football); 24–40 (basketball)

David C. Henderson (born c. 1917) was an American football player and coach of football and basketball. He served as the head football coach at Kenyon College from 1946 to 1951 and at Allegheny College from 1952 to 1953, compiling a career college football record of 15–40–2 Henderson was also the head basketball coach at Kenyon for four seasons, from 1948 to 1952, tallying a mark of 24–40. He played football at the College of Wooster, from which he graduated in 1939.

== Head coaching record ==
=== Football ===
Year	Team	Overall	Conference	Standing	Bowl/playoffs
Kenyon Lords (Ohio Athletic Conference) (1946–1951)
1946	Kenyon	1–7	1–5	T–15th	
1947	Kenyon	3–4	1–1	T–8th	
1948	Kenyon	1–6–1	0–3	T–15th	
1949	Kenyon	0–6	0–4	T–13th	
1950	Kenyon	5–0–1	NA	NA	
1951	Kenyon	3–3	NA	NA	
Kenyon:		13–26–2	2–13		
Allegheny Gators (Independent) (1952–1953)
1952	Allegheny	2–6			
1953	Allegheny	0–8			
Allegheny:		2–14			
Total:		15–40–2			
