= James Henderson (surgeon) =

British physician, surgeon, and author

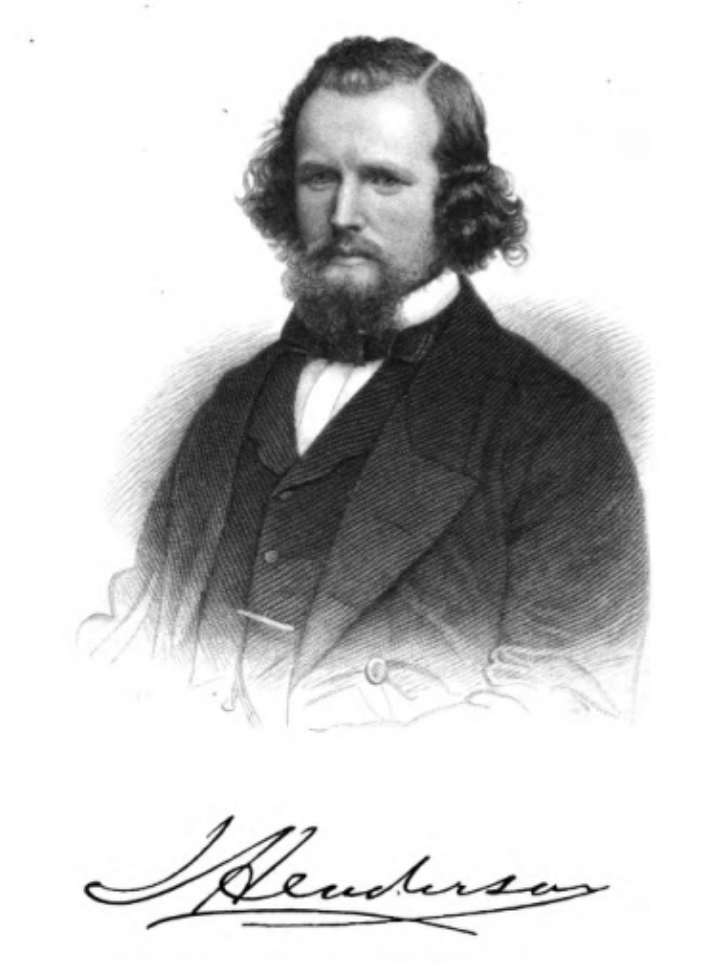
- James Henderson and his signature
- Born: James Henderson; 1829; Northern Scotland
- Died: 1865 (aged 35–36); Nagasaki, Japan
- Occupations: Physician, surgeon, author
- Known for: Medical mission work in Shanghai, China

James Henderson, M.D. (1829–1865) was a British physician, surgeon, and author. After attending a meeting of the Edinburgh Medical Missionary Society (EMMS International) on 18 December 1856, he decided to become a medical missionary. In these early years of his medical missionary work training, Henderson evidently displayed his religious values by emphasizing the importance for students who were studying medicine at the time to become Christians and medical missionaries. During his time in Edinburgh Medical School, he was described as being a “uniformly regular, punctual, and diligent; conscientious, zealous, and laborious; kind to the poor, and self-denying [student].” Starting his notable medical missionary work in the mid-nineteenth century, Henderson worked in the London Missionary Society, where he took charge of the Chinese Hospital, which is called Renji Hospital. Henderson played a critical role in educating about surgical techniques, sanitation, and chloroform as well as making overall improvements in the hospital and surrounding environment.

== Biography ==
James Henderson was born to the Henderson family in a small cottage on a moor in northern Scotland. He was the youngest of three children, including an older brother and sister, two and four years respectively. When he was just three years old, his father died after serious complications from a rupture in a blood vessel in a lung. Two years after his father's death, the family migrated to his mother's father's house where Henderson was brought up in a neighborhood filled with superstition, ominous feelings, and witchcraft. At thirteen years old, Henderson became an orphan and thrown into a world of uncertainty, independence, and sorrow as his mother and grandfather, his two biggest idols, died.

=== Careers ===
Henderson's sudden independence forced him to seek out random jobs. His first boss was a farmer who paid him less than a shilling a week, which was upsetting since he worked too hard. Then, he worked for another farmer until he was sixteen years old. His third job was being a servant to the surgeon of the district, which most certainly was when his interest in medicine spurred. Then, he was an underbutler. In 1859, he became a Director of the London Missionary Society. His most notable profession was running the Renji hospital. Meantime, he subsequently attained the position as vice-president of the North China Branch of the Royal Asiatic Society.

=== Early Influences/Inspiration ===
Overall, Henderson endured a childhood of monotony, and was able to find happiness in the few opportunities he received to be educated after the age of sixteen years. He looked up to his mother and credited her for his actions: “I had the greatest love and reverence for my mother; whatever she said I most firmly believed was right, and whatever she intimated I ought to do, I was only too glad to do it. Nothing could give me greater pain than to think she was displeased with me; nor can I recall to this day one single act of disobedience to her, thank God!” The other minor impact was his maternal grandfather who gave him plentiful advice. Perhaps, the greatest influence came from the poor class, who inspired Henderson with their feelings of gratitude even in times of great suffering. Hence, he was motivated to seek opportunities in the “large field of usefulness.”

== Religion ==
James Henderson was a very religious man whose strong Christian faith was sometimes the only reason he was able to define his existence in the poverty-stricken society. Daily, his pious, widowed mother made it a deal to make sure all the kids were well-versed in Scripture, Scotch paraphrases, and Shorter Catechism. Around the time of his mother's death, he dedicated his life to service of Christ. One of his premature desires was to become the minister of the Free Church, which he later abandoned.

== Education ==
At an early age, Henderson was literate, but neither wrote nor knew basic math. His all-time wish was to study in a university, which was tough since he was of low status and older. He believed in the whole “Where there is a will, there is a way” ideology; his prayers were soon answered. Between 1855 and 1858, he was a fellow of the Royal College of Surgeons of Edinburgh. Finally, he obtained a diploma as a physician from the University of St Andrews in 1859. One of the directors of the London Missionary Society perfectly summed up his astonishment of Henderson's journey through life with respect to education: “I could hardly believe that he had never seen the inside of a school, even of the humblest character, and that, twenty years before, he had been a bare-footed lad, herding sheep on the muir of Rhynie; that, some thirteen years ago, he could not have written his own name, and nevertheless he had forced his way to the University of Edinburgh, had taken prizes in classes of two hundred medical students, received the diploma of the College of Surgeons, and won for himself the respect and friendship of men of the highest Christian character and professional distinction.”

== Medical Missionary Work ==
=== Turning Point ===
On 18 December 1856 Henderson attended a meeting of the Edinburgh Medical Missionary Society (EMMS) and decided to become a medical missionary. By this time, the society unanimously adopted twenty-eight year-old Henderson.

=== Early efforts ===
Henderson yearned to be a popular physician, specifically, a surgeon beyond his native land. In August 1858, there was no opening abroad and he settled for private practice in the native country in Rhynie, Aberdeenshire for seven months. Much to his dismay, he was unsatisfied even though his business was very successful. In 1859, under the supervision of Reverend G.D. Cullen, he applied to the Directors of London Missionary Society. A fellow director expressed his gratitude for Dr. James Henderson to join their team: “His self-possessed manner, gentlemanly bearing, and frank answers to all the questions put to him in turn by the several members of the committee, excited special interest in him as a man; while his evident simple-hearted devotedness to the great work of Christian missions, his anxiety to consecrate his talents and attainments to the service of Christ among the Chinese as a missionary physician, and his manifest intelligence and proved energy of character, secured the suffrages of the whole board, and he was unanimously accepted.” After joining this society, Henderson was assigned by Dr. Elijah Coleman Bridgman to take over the Chinese Hospital in Shanghai, formerly run by Mr. William Lockhart (surgeon) and Dr. Benjamin Hobson.

=== Journey ===
On 22 October 1859 Henderson boarded Heroes of Alma at Gravesend with six other missionaries. After arriving in Shanghai, Henderson took over the Renji hospital, founded fifteen years earlier. In the hospital, the daily routine consisted of religious services in the morning, examining cases, giving out prescriptions, and culminated with performing surgeries. The unique thing about Henderson's practice was the method in which patients were examined- ten women, then ten men, followed by same pattern until finished. Perhaps, his deep gratitude for women came from his mother, which is why he considered the female gender to be superior to the male gender. Using the help of Chin Foo, a local loyal apothecary and house surgeon, Henderson was able to treat around twenty thousand patients within the first few months. One of the most common cases were opium smokers who wanted to quit. Another frequent miracle performed by the foreign doctor was giving sight to the blind. A hospital associate described the success and variety of his work: the blind receive their sight, the lame walk, the lepers are cleansed, and the poor have the gospel preached unto them."

Perhaps, the one thing that made Henderson widely noticed was his usage of chloroform, which he used as anesthesia to deal with sleeping sickness. Having gained the trust of the locals, the Chinese patients were under the spell of Henderson and his magic. Since he integrated himself into the local community, he felt the importance for natives to obtain translated reports of incidents that occurred in the hospital. He participated in bi-monthly conferences, where he read his original papers about medical missions. One time at a Royal Asiatic Society of Great Britain and Ireland meeting, he got and read his research notes on the physical causes that modify climate. Besides leaving a piece of him in his writings, his dedication towards helping nearby missions and helping future doctors was a critical characteristic about him. Fortunately, on top of his busy schedule, Henderson managed to examine dead bodies and thus, provide crucial information for researchers in the future. On 10 January 1862 Henderson abruptly left to England, where he married a woman he met when he departed for Shanghai and soon, had a baby girl. He greatly desired to go back, which he did in May. James Henderson dedicated his life to medical missionary work for three years until his unfortunate death by unknown reasons.

== Legacy ==
James Henderson was most known for making substantial improvements to the existing Renji Hospital; the most significant was spreading his knowledge about better surgical techniques He resolved dominant issues such as crowding and sanitation, both of which were major problems that worsened the chance for eliminating disease. This also spurred interest, on behalf of his action, of a general hospital and a sanatorium for foreigners. In addition, he educated people about general cleanliness, hygiene, and importance of sleeping. Furthermore, his knack for practicality resulted in his decision to move the surgeon's new house closer to the hospital, which allowed for efficiency between procedures. Apart from his medical career, he successfully exerted his Protestantism and strong faith on his patients and prayed earnestly for victims until god let them die beautifully in his hands. In regards to sustainability, he wrote publications and collaborated with local organizations to make an impact. Two of his most famous pieces, “Shanghai Hygiene” and “Hints for Preservation of Health in Shanghai” were noticed by the government and his missions were undertaken by various local medical missionaries.

== Criticism ==
Reverend Canon Vaughan characterized James Henderson with the following quote: "Cannot be called great men, greatness lies entirely in direction of goodness, which is solely dependent on their character, personality, and motivation as well as willingness to sacrifice time and effort." Since James Henderson was an independent, quiet man, sometimes the accuracy of the details of his life is questioned especially since much of his life was narrated through his widow.
