= Caroline Henderson (journalist) =

Scottish broadcast journalist

Caroline Henderson (born 14 May 1985) is a Scottish broadcast journalist, currently working as a sports presenter for STV News in East Central Scotland.

Born in Kirkcaldy, Fife, Henderson was educated at St Leonards School in St Andrews and won a Best Speaker award in a National Youth Parliament competition at the age of 14. She studied an HNC in Radio Broadcasting and travelled to Canada as part of a media core on a live fire training exercise with the former Black Watch regiment, before working as a freelance journalist for local radio stations Forth One and Radio Borders.

While studying a journalism degree at the University of Sunderland, Henderson joined the BBC in Newcastle in April 2008, working as a newsreader, reporter and producer for radio, online and television services in the North East and Cumbria. While at the BBC, she covered the Cumbria shootings and Northumbria Police's manhunt for Raoul Moat.

Henderson joined STV in October 2010 as a sports correspondent and in May 2011, became the sports presenter for its new Edinburgh-based edition of the regional news programme STV News at Six.
