= Robert Henderson (footballer) =

English footballer

Personal information
- Full name: Robert Henderson
- Place of birth: England
- Position: Full back

Senior career*
Years	Team	Apps	(Gls)
1904–1905	Burnley	10	(0)
- Clitheroe
- * Club domestic league appearances and goals

Robert Henderson was an English professional footballer. His position was full back. He played 10 matches in the Football League for Burnley before moving to non-league side Clitheroe.
