= John Henderson (Scottish footballer) =

Scottish footballer

Personal information
- Full name: John Henderson
- Date of birth: 22 September 1941 (age 85)
- Place of birth: Johnshaven, Scotland
- Position: Inside right

Youth career
- 1955–1959: Montrose Victoria
- 1959–1962: Charlton Athletic Reserves

Senior career*
Years	Team	Apps	(Gls)
1962–1963	Charlton Athletic	4	(1)
1963–1964	Exeter City	46	(14)
1964–1965	Doncaster Rovers	10	(0)
1965–1966	Chesterfield	28	(3)
1966–1973	Kidderminster Harriers	331	(141)
Total		419	(159)
- * Club domestic league appearances and goals

John Henderson (born 22 September 1941 in Johnshaven, Scotland), is a Scottish footballer who played as an inside right in the English Football League.

After spells in the Football League with Charlton Athletic, Exeter City and Doncaster Rovers Henderson joined semi-professional Kidderminster Harriers from Chesterfield in the summer of 1966, scoring 141 goals in 331 games. Highlights of his career with the Hariers were a 1st Round FA Cup tie with Brighton and Hove Albion, and winning the West Midland League in 1968–69.

Retiring in 1973 the Scot settled in Kidderminster with his family.
