= Andrew Henderson (English cricketer) =

English cricketer

Personal information
- Full name: Andrew Arthur Henderson
- Born: 14 July 1941 (age 85); Chadwell Heath, Essex, England
- Batting: Right-handed
- Bowling: Right-arm medium

Domestic team information
- Years: Team
- 1972: Sussex
- 1964–1965: Buckinghamshire

Career statistics
Competition	First-class
Matches	1
Runs scored	11
Batting average	5.50
100s/50s	–/–
Top score	9
Balls bowled	241
Wickets	5
Bowling average	26.40
5 wickets in innings	–
10 wickets in match	–
Best bowling	3/65
Catches/stumpings	–/–
- Source: Cricinfo, 12 May 2011

Andrew Arthur Henderson (born 14 July 1941) is a former English cricketer. Henderson was a right-handed batsman who bowled right-arm medium pace. He was born in Chadwell Heath, Essex.

Henderson made his debut for Buckinghamshire in the 1964 Minor Counties Championship against Berkshire. Henderson played two further Minor Counties Championship fixtures for the county in 1965, against Hertfordshire and Berkshire.

Having played Second XI cricket for the Sussex Second XI since 1968, Henderson made his only first-class appearance for Sussex in the 1972 County Championship against Gloucestershire. In the Gloucestershire first-innings he took 3 wickets for 65 runs, while in their second-innings he took 2 wickets for 67 runs. With the bat he was dismissed for 2 runs by Sadiq Mohammad in the Sussex first-innings, while in their second-innings he scored 9 runs before being dismissed by John Mortimore.
