= Brian Henderson (Australian footballer) =

Australian rules footballer

- Henderson in 1964

Personal information
- Full name: Brian Henderson
- Born: 18 June 1943
- Died: 16 June 2017 (aged 73); Wagga Wagga, Sydney, New South Wales
- Original team: Brunswick City
- Height: 185 cm (6 ft 1 in)
- Weight: 80 kg (176 lb)

Playing career^{1}
Years	Club	Games (Goals)
1964	Carlton	2 (0)
- ^{1} Playing statistics correct to the end of 1964.

Brian Henderson (18 June 1943 – 16 June 2017) was an Australian rules footballer who played for the Carlton Football Club in the Victorian Football League (VFL).
