= Ian Henderson =

Ian Henderson may refer to:

- Ian Henderson (RAF officer) (1896–1918), English World War I flying ace
- Ian Henderson (rugby union) (1918–1991), Scottish player
- Ian Henderson (police officer) (1927–2013), British former Director of Intelligence in Bahrain
- Ian Henderson (politician) (born 1940), member of the Queensland Parliament
- Ian Henderson (news presenter) (born 1952), Australian news presenter
- Ian Henderson (musician), New Zealand drummer
- Ian Henderson (racing driver) (born 1980), American racing driver
- Ian Henderson (rugby league) (born 1983), English-born Scottish rugby league player
- Ian Henderson (footballer) (born 1985), English footballer for Rochdale

== See also ==
- Iain Henderson (born 1992), rugby union player
- Iain Henderson (Royal Navy officer) (born 1948)
