= Andrew Henderson (Scottish cricketer) =

Scottish cricketer (1922–2020)

Personal information
- Born: 23 January 1922; Selkirk, Scotland
- Died: 18 August 2020 (aged 98); West Moors, Dorset, England
- Source: Cricinfo, 23 September 2020

Andrew Henderson (23 January 1922 – 18 August 2020) was a Scottish cricketer. He played in one first-class match for the Scotland cricket team, against Ireland, in 1953.
