= Alexander Henderson =

Alexander or Alex Henderson may refer to:

- Alexander Henderson (theologian) (c. 1583–1646), Scottish theologian
- Alexander Henderson (American politician) (1738–1815), Scottish merchant and politician in Virginia
- Alexander Henderson of Press (c. 1770–1826), Lord Provost of Edinburgh, 1823–1825
- Alexander Henderson (physician) (1780–1863), Scottish physician, author of History of Ancient and Modern Wines (1824)
- Alexander Henderson (priest) (1807–1888), Scottish Episcopalian priest, Dean of Glasgow and Galloway
- Alexander Henderson (manager) (1828–1886), British theatrical manager, proprietor and promoter
- Alexander Henderson, 1st Baron Faringdon (1850–1934), British politician
- Alexander Henderson (Canadian politician) (1860–1940), historical member of the Legislative Assembly of British Columbia, and Commissioner of Yukon 1907–1911
- Alexander D. Henderson Jr. (1895–1964), American businessman
- Alex Henderson (Scottish footballer) (1800s), Scottish footballer
- Alexander Gavin Henderson, 2nd Baron Faringdon (1902–1977), British Labour politician
- Alex Henderson (footballer, born 2001), English footballer
- Alex Henderson (footballer, born 2004), English footballer
- Alex Henderson (runner), winner of the 1958 NCAA two-mile run championship
- Alex Henderson (bowls), Scottish bowls player
- Alex Henderson, band member of Big Bad Voodoo Daddy.
