= James A. Henderson =

Businessman (born c. 1934)

James A. Henderson (born c. 1934) was chairman of the board from 1995 and chief executive officer from 1994 of Cummins in Columbus, Indiana, until his retirement in December 1999. Henderson was a director of AT&T from October 1999 to April 27, 2007. He served as a director of Ameritech from 1983 until the company was acquired by SBC Communications in 1999. He also served as a director of Indiana Bell Telephone Company from 1978 until 1983. Henderson is a director of International Paper, Nanophase Technologies Corporation, Rohm & Haas and Ryerson Tull. He graduated from Princeton University and Harvard Business School.
