= Arthur Henderson (disambiguation) =

Arthur Henderson (1863–1935) was a British politician and union leader, Leader of the Labour Party.

Arthur Henderson may also refer to:

- Arthur Henderson (baseball) (1897–1988), Negro league baseball player
- Arthur Henderson (VC) (1893–1917), British Army officer
- Arthur Henderson, Baron Rowley (1893–1968), British Labour Party politician
- Arthur Henderson (rugby league), Australian rugby league player
