= George Goddard (cricketer) =

Scottish cricketer (born 1938)

Personal information
- Full name: George Ferguson Goddard
- Born: 19 May 1938 (age 88); Edinburgh, Midlothian, Scotland
- Batting: Right-handed
- Bowling: Right-arm off break

International information
- National side: Scotland

Domestic team information
- Years: Team
- 1961–1983: Scotland

Career statistics
Competition	First-class	List A
Matches	22	15
Runs scored	371	58
Batting average	13.25	6.44
100s/50s	–/–	–/–
Top score	39	14
Balls bowled	2,329	772
Wickets	41	9
Bowling average	26.86	45.44
5 wickets in innings	2	–
10 wickets in match	1	–
Best bowling	8/34	2/25
Catches/stumpings	8/–	–/–
- Source: Cricinfo, 10 August 2011

George Ferguson Goddard MBE (born 19 May 1938) is a former Scottish cricketer. Goddard was a right-handed batsman who bowled right-arm off break. He was born in Edinburgh, Midlothian and educated at George Heriot's School.

Goddard made his first-class debut for Scotland against Ireland in 1960. He played 21 further first-class matches for Scotland, the last of which came against Ireland in 1980. He had entered the Scottish team as a batsman, but as his career progressed he became predominantly a bowler. In 22 first-class matches, he took 41 wickets at an average of 26.86 and best figures of 8/34. These figures came against Ireland in 1972. These figures remain to this day the best innings bowling figures for Scotland in first-class cricket. As a lower-order batsman, Goddard scored 371 runs at a batting average of 13.25, with a high score of 39. He captained Scotland from 1974, having replaced James Brown, until 1980 when he was replaced by Richard Swan.

He made his List A debut for Scotland against Leicestershire in the 1980 Benson & Hedges Cup, a match which marked Scotland's debut in that format. He made 14 further List A matches for Scotland, the last of which came against Gloucestershire in the 1983 NatWest Trophy. In his 15 List A matches, he took 9 wickets at an average of 45.44, with best figures of 2/25. With the bat, he scored 58 runs at an average of 6.44, with a high score of 14.

Outside of cricket, he worked as an accountant. In the 1982 New Year Honours Goddard was appointed a Member of the Order of the British Empire for services to Scottish cricket. In 2011 he was one of the twelve initial inductees into the Scottish Cricket Hall of Fame.
