= James Henderson (cricketer, born 1918) =

Scottish cricketer and schoolteacher

Personal information
- Full name: James Douglas Henderson
- Born: 13 October 1918; Kelso, Roxburghshire, Scotland
- Died: 14 August 2004 (aged 85); Forfar, Angus, Scotland
- Batting: Left-handed
- Bowling: Left-arm medium

Domestic team information
- Years: Team
- 1946–1956: Scotland

Career statistics
Competition	First-class
Matches	14
Runs scored	429
Batting average	22.57
100s/50s	1/1
Top score	121
Balls bowled	2,210
Wickets	29
Bowling average	22.41
5 wickets in innings	1
10 wickets in match	–
Best bowling	5/27
Catches/stumpings	7/–
- Source: Cricinfo, 9 July 2022

James Douglas Henderson (13 October 1918 — 14 August 2004) was a Scottish first-class cricketer and educator.

Henderson was born in October 1918 at Kelso. He was educated at Forfar Academy, before matriculating to the University of St Andrews. A club cricketer for Forfarshire Cricket Club, Henderson made his debut for Scotland in first-class cricket against Ireland at Greenock in 1946. He played first-class cricket for Scotland until 1956, making fourteen appearances; eight of these came in the annual match against Ireland, while a further six came against English first-class counties. Playing as an all-rounder in the Scottish side, he scored 429 runs at an average of 22.57; he made one century, a score of 121 against Ireland in 1954, forming a partnership of 187 runs with William Edward for the eighth wicket. With his left-arm medium pace bowling, he took 29 wickets at a bowling average of 22.41; he took one five wicket haul, with figures of 5 for 27 against Ireland in 1952. By profession, Henderson was a schoolmaster. He died at Forfar in August 2004.
