= David Henderson (philosopher) =

American philosopher (born 1954)

David Henderson (born 1954) is an American philosopher and Robert R. Chambers Distinguished Professor of Philosophy at the University of Nebraska–Lincoln. He is known for his works on epistemology and the philosophy of the social sciences.
