= Gordon Henderson =

Gordon Henderson may refer to:

- Gordon F. Henderson (1912–1993), Canadian intellectual property lawyer
- Gordon Henderson (politician) (born 1948), British Conservative Member of Parliament for Sittingbourne and Sheppey
- Gordon Henderson (filmmaker), chairman of 90th Parallel Productions
- Gordon Smith Henderson (1866–1938), Scottish-Canadian lawyer and political figure in Ottawa
- Gordon Henderson (band director) (born 1953), director of the UCLA Bruin Marching Band
- Gordon Henderson (musician), leader and founder of the musical group Exile One
