= John Henderson (activist) =

American lawyer

John B. Henderson, Esq. (1925-2010) was an attorney, business executive, sailor and member of the Miami Lighthouse Board. He was an American naval officer and Secretary of Defense operative during the Truman presidency.

A native of Australia, John Henderson came to the U.S. with his parents as a child and settled in Brooklyn. After the death of his parents, he was reared by an aunt who lived in Maryland, where he first learned to sail. Henderson attended a military prep school and, later, Brown University. He was commissioned as a naval officer just before the end of World War II.

He later attended graduate school and earned a law degree from Harvard Law School. As a young lawyer and naval officer he worked as counsel to the Secretary of Defense, writing memos for then President Harry S. Truman. After government service he became a corporate attorney when he was stricken retinitis pigmentosa and lost his sight. "I continued working as Vice President and Legal Counsel for Textron, but I was no longer considered a candidate to be its President", he recalled.

He carried on as an attorney and businessman. He also continued with his avocation, sailing, having bought and sailed three different boats after losing his sight. His longest journey was from his home in Providence, Rhode Island to South Florida after retiring. In Florida, he became active with the Miami Lighthouse and joined its Board in the 1990s.
