= Bob Henderson (Scottish footballer) =

Scottish footballer

Personal information
- Place of birth: Scotland
- Position: Winger

Senior career*
Years	Team	Apps	(Gls)
1929–1931	Burnley	3	(0)
1931–1932	New Brighton	11	(0)
- * Club domestic league appearances and goals

Robert D. Henderson was a Scottish professional footballer who played as a winger. He played in the English Football League for Burnley and New Brighton.
