= William Henderson (priest) =

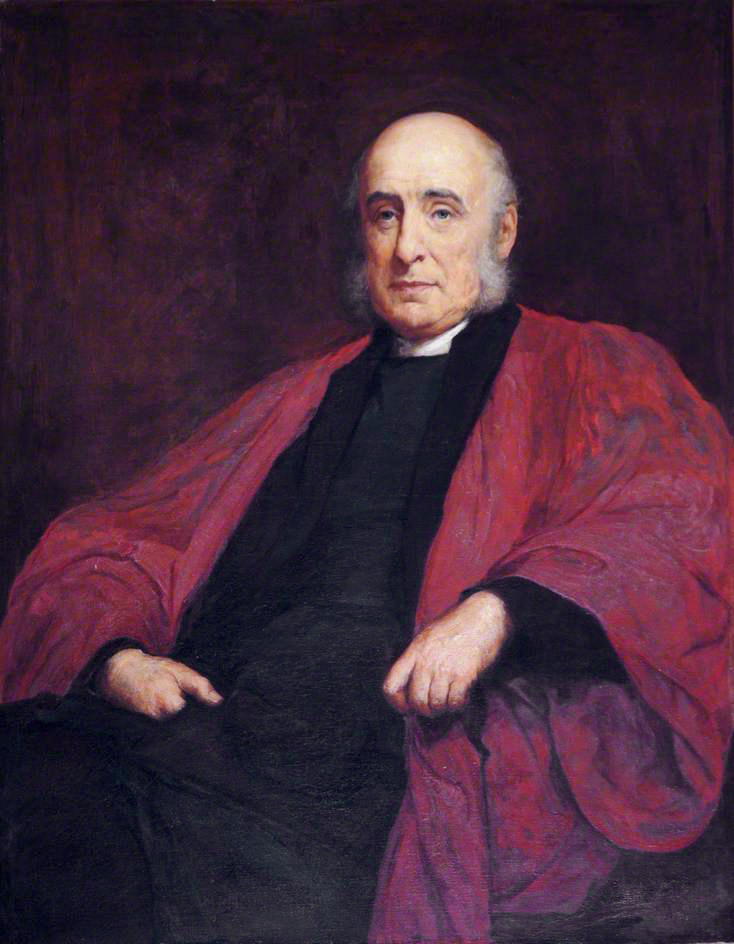
Henderson (Walter William Ouless)

William George Henderson (25 June 1819 – 24 September 1905) was Dean of Carlisle from 1884 to his death in 1905.

== Early life ==
Henderson was born in 1819 at Harbridge, Hampshire. He was the son of Vice-Admiral George Henderson; a brother was Sir Edmund Henderson. He attended Magdalen College, Oxford.

== Career ==
Henderson was a Fellow of Magdalen College, Oxford, his alma mater and a Tutor at Durham University. He was Master of Hatfield College, Durham, from 1851 to 1852.

Henderson was ordained in 1859. He was then Headmaster of Victoria College, Jersey, and Leeds Grammar School before his appointment to the Carlisle Deanery.

He married Jane Melville Dalyell, daughter of John Dalyell. A son was George Francis Robert Henderson. Another son was Admiral Charles Ferdinand Henderson.

Henderson was a scholar who edited various liturgical works.

- Missale ad usum insignis ecclesiae Eboracensis 2 vols. 1874 (York missal)
- Missale ad usum percelebris Ecclesiæ Herfordensis 1874 (Hereford missal)
- Liber pontificalis Chr. Bainbridge, Archiepiscopi Eboracensis 1875 (Pontifical of Abp Bainbridge)
- Manuale et processionale ad usum insignis ecclesiae Eboracensis 1875 (York manual and processional)

&Processionale ad usum insignis ac praeclarae ecclesiae Sarum 1882 (Sarum processional)

- --do.-- Farnborough: Gregg, 1969 ISBN 0576991430

He died on 24 September 1905.

Church of England titles
Preceded by John Oakley	Dean of Carlisle; 1884–1906	Succeeded by Charles Ridgeway
