= Frank Henderson (cricketer) =

Australian cricketer

Personal information
- Born: 1 June 1908; Tighes Hill, New South Wales, Australia
- Died: 6 December 1954 (aged 46); Melbourne, Australia
- Source: ESPNcricinfo, 31 December 2016

Frank Henderson (1 June 1908 – 6 December 1954) was an Australian cricketer. He played two first-class matches for New South Wales between 1928/29 and 1929/30.

== See also ==
- List of New South Wales representative cricketers
