= Matt Henderson =

Matt Henderson may refer to:

- Matt Henderson (cricketer) (1895–1970), New Zealand cricketer
- Matt Henderson (ice hockey) (born 1974), retired American professional ice hockey player
