= Elsie Henderson =

British painter and sculptor (1880–1967)

- Born: 28 May 1880; Eastbourne, Sussex, England
- Died: 1967 (aged 86–87)
- Education: South Kensington Schools; Slade School of Fine Art; Académie Colarossi; Chelsea Polytechnic
- Known for: Painting and sculpture
- Spouse: Henri Baron de Coudenhove (m. 1928–c.1945, his death)

Elsie Marian Henderson, later Baroness de Coudenhove, (28 May 1880 – 1967) was a British painter and sculptor notable for her animal paintings.

== Biography ==
Henderson was born in Eastbourne in Sussex and with the encouragement of her mother, a keen amateur painter, she attended the South Kensington Schools before studying at the Slade School of Fine Art between 1903 and 1905. Henderson continued her art education in Paris. For periods of time, between 1908 and 1912, she took lessons at various ateliers in the city including the Academie Moderne, the Académie Colarossi, the Académie de La Palette and at Cercle Russe. In 1912 Henderson studied with Othon Friesz before spending 1913 in Italy. After some time on the island of Guernsey, Henderson enrolled at the Chelsea Polytechnic in 1916, where she was taught lithography by the artist Francis Ernest Jackson. In London she became a frequent visitor to London Zoo and animal drawings and paintings became a major theme of her work. London Transport commissioned a poster from her to promote travel to the Zoo, which was, despite its unusual design, well received. Henderson started her own press and became a member of the Senefelder Club. In 1924 Henderson had her first solo exhibition at the Leicester Galleries in London. The exhibition consisted of drawings, lithographs and bronze sculptures of, often savage, animals such as Jaguar Tearing its Prey and Leopard Killing a Parrot. Between 1927 and 1938 several works by Henderson featured in exhibitions hosted by the Society of Graver Printers in Colour.

In 1928 Henderson married Henri Baron de Coudenhove, the French consul to Guernsey. The couple lived on the island during World War II and throughout the German occupation. Baron de Coudenhove died towards the end of the war and in 1946 Henderson moved to Hadlow Down in Sussex. She continued painting into the last years of her life.

During her lifetime Henderson exhibited at the Royal Academy, with the Women's International Art Club and the Society of Women Artists. A joint retrospective exhibition of Henderson's work, with that of her friend Orovida Pissarro, was held in 1985 at the Michael Parkin Gallery. Sally Hunter Fine Art subsequently held exhibitions of her work in 1999, 2001 and 2004 at various locations. The Tate holds two examples of her work, both from 1916, while the British Museum holds several pieces. The Victoria and Albert Museum in London, the Fitzwilliam Museum in Cambridge and Manchester City Art Gallery also hold works by Henderson.
