= Wayne Henderson =

Wayne Henderson may refer to:

- Wayne Henderson (footballer) (born 1983), Irish goalkeeper
- Wayne Henderson (luthier) (born 1947), American luthier specializing in handmade, custom acoustic guitars
- Wayne Henderson (musician) (1939–2014), American soul-jazz and hard bop trombonist and record producer
- Wayne Henderson (alpine skier) (born 1944), Canadian former alpine skier
