= Grace Baxter Fenderson =

New Jersey teacher and clubwoman

- Grace Baxter Fenderson, from a 1936 magazine
- Born: November 2, 1883; Newark, New Jersey, US
- Died: February 21, 1962 (aged 78); Philadelphia, Pennsylvania, US
- Occupation(s): Educator, clubwoman
- Years active: 1906–1948
- Known for: Co-founder of Newark chapter, NAACP

Grace Baxter Fenderson (November 2, 1883 – March 21, 1962) was an American educator and clubwoman based in Newark, New Jersey. A teacher at Monmouth Street School in Newark for over 40 years, Fenderson was a co-founder of the Newark chapter of the NAACP and served as president of the Lincoln-Douglass Memorial Association. In 1959, Fenderson received the Sojourner Truth Award from the New Jersey chapter of the National Association of Negro Business and Professional Women's Clubs (NANBPWC).

== Early life ==
Grace Baxter was born in Newark, the daughter of James Miller Baxter and Pauline Louisa Mars Baxter. Her father was a teacher born in Philadelphia, and the first Black school principal in Newark. Her mother was the first Black graduate of the School of Design at Cooper Union. Her brother J. Leroy Baxter was a dental surgeon and New Jersey state legislator. She graduated from Newark Normal School in 1906, trained as a teacher.

== Career ==
Fenderson taught at Monmouth Street School in Newark for over 40 years, one of the first Black teachers in the Newark public schools. Many years later, a Polish-born former student recalled, "I didn't speak a word of English, and I was very frightened. She would say, 'Sit down, we're going to do good work today.'" The former student added, "She'd come to my house to see if I was studying, She came for visits, for holidays. I never forgot her."

Fenderson co-founded the Newark chapter of the NAACP in 1914; both she and her brother J. Leroy Baxter held leadership roles in the chapter, and she was elected to serve on the national Board of Directors in 1936. In 1922 she organized an anti-lynching parade in Newark. In 1940, she ran for a state assembly seat. She was active with the national and local NAACP through the 1940s and 1950s.

In the 1940s Fenderson was president of the Lincoln-Douglass Memorial Association. She was also active in the Newark YWCA, The New Jersey Urban League, the New Jersey Mental Health Association, the New Jersey Education Association, and the Schoolwomen's Club of Newark. She supported efforts to educate Black women voters, to protect migrant farm workers, and build a community hospital. In 1959, the North Jersey chapter of the National Association of Negro Business and Professional Women's Clubs presented their first Sojourner Truth Award to Fenderson. In 1961, she narrated a Negro History Week program at a church in Belleville, New Jersey.

== Personal life ==
Grace Baxter married Walter E. Fenderson in 1917. Grace Baxter Fenderson died in 1962, aged 78 years, in Philadelphia. Congressman Hugh Joseph Adonizio read a tribute to Fenderson into the Congressional Record, shortly after her death.
