= Jamie Henderson =

Jamie Henderson may refer to:

- Jamie Henderson (American football) (born 1979), National Football League cornerback
- Jamie Henderson (sprinter) (born 1969), Scottish athletics competitor
