= Hendry =

Hendry is a surname:

- Hendry is a surname of the Scottish Clan Henderson and a variant of the name Henry. It is also associated with the Scottish Clan MacNaghten.

Persons with a Hendry surname:

- Billy Hendry (1869–1901), Scottish football player
- Charles Hendry, English politician
- Colin Hendry, Scottish former professional football player
- David Forbes Hendry, British econometrician
- Diana Hendry, English poet and author
- Drew Hendry (born 1964), Scottish National Party politician; uncle of wrestler Joe Hendry
- Francis A. Hendry (1883–1917), American Florida early settler, politician
- George W. Hendry (1838–1914), American Florida early settler, military personnel
- Gloria Hendry, U.S. actress
- Ian Hendry, English actor
- J. F. Hendry, Scottish poet
- Jamie Hendry, British theatre producer
- Jim Hendry (cyclist) (1939–2023), British professional cyclist
- Jim Hendry, U.S. baseball General Manager of the Chicago Cubs
- Joan Hendry, Canadian former athlete
- Joe Hendry (born 1988), Scottish wrestler
- Joe Hendry (footballer) (1886–1966), Scottish footballer
- Robert Hendry, American politician
- Stephen Hendry, Scottish snooker player
- Stephen Hendry (footballer), Scottish footballer

Places named Hendry:

- Hendry County, Florida, USA

== See also ==
- Hendrie
- Henry (disambiguation)
