= Eddie Henderson =

Eddie Henderson may refer to:

- Eddie Henderson (soccer) (born 1967), American soccer player
- Eddie Henderson (musician) (born 1940), American jazz trumpet and flugelhorn player
- Eddie Henderson, educator and namesake of Eddie S Henderson Stadium

== See also ==
- Edward Henderson (disambiguation)
- Edmund Henderson
