= Jack Henderson (author) =

American thriller writer (born 1958)

- Born: October 3, 1958 (age 67); Springfield, Missouri
- Occupation: Writer
- Spouse: 1985 - present
- Children: 2
- Writing career
- Language: English
- Genre: Thriller
- Website: jackhenderson.com

Jack Henderson is an American thriller writer. He writes the series of novels featuring hacker John Fagan, aka phr33k, and FBI agent Jeannie Reese.

== Biography ==
Henderson was born in Springfield, Missouri on October 3, 1958 and was brought up in Buffalo, Missouri.

Henderson did not complete a university degree, although he did complete two years of further education in Performing Arts before leaving college to work in regional theatre. While finding work in this capacity in New York City, Henderson started writing technical documentation for the medical industry, requiring him to perform a great deal of research into the topics discussed.

Henderson has stated that he put in "nearly a year of research and fact-finding" before starting to write his first novel, Maximum Impact (known as Circumference of Darkness in the US). He has since written a follow-up novel, Seven Seconds, and ghost-wrote the book The Overton Window for political commentator Glenn Beck. The Overton Window contains marked similarities to Circumference of Darkness.

== Bibliography ==
=== The John Fagan series ===
- Maximum Impact (2007, Sphere) (aka Circumference of Darkness (Bantam) in the US)
- Seven Seconds (2009, Sphere)

=== Other works ===
- The Overton Window (2010, Threshold)
