= Dick Henderson =

English music hall comedian, singer, and actor (1891–1958)

- Autographed photo
- Born: Richard Henderson; 20 March 1891; Sculcoates, Hull, East Riding of Yorkshire, England
- Died: 15 October 1958 (aged 67); Paddington, London, England
- Occupation(s): Comedian, singer, actor

Richard Henderson (20 March 1891 – 15 October 1958) was an English music hall comedian, singer and character actor.

== Life and career ==
Dick Henderson was born in Sculcoates, Hull, East Riding of Yorkshire, the son of a machinist. He was an apprentice fitter at a shipyard, before leaving to join a pierrot troupe at Withernsea. He made his first London appearance in 1914. He was heavily built, smoked a cigar on stage, and wore tight suits to emphasise his girth, together with ill-matched shoes and a bowler hat several sizes too small.

He found success with his quick-fire patter, often joking in a marked Yorkshire accent about his fictional wife or mother-in-law. He was billed as "The Yorkshire Comedian" or sometimes "The Yorkshire Nightingale", and was known for his baritone singing as well as his comedy. He entered the stage singing and playing "Tiptoe Through the Tulips" – a song which he was the first in Britain to record – on the ukulele. He sang both comedy songs such as "Have You Ever Seen a Straight Banana", and sentimental songs, and was reputedly the first comedian to end his performances with a 'straight' song.

According to Roger Wilmut, Henderson "bridged the gap between character and gag comedians.... [His] gags were always personalized — linked into a loose structure, and told in the first person, rather than presented as a string of isolated gags. When he included a particularly obvious joke, he would follow it with his catchphrase: 'Ha! Ha! – joke over!'"

He appeared in the Royal Variety Performances in 1926, which consolidated his success. He also became popular in the United States, first visiting in 1924, and again in 1930, and made several Vitaphone short films. He appeared in the now-lost 1930 film The Man from Blankley's, and in the 1935 musical comedy film Things Are Looking Up. In the latter film he performed with his son, Dickie Henderson, who later also became a popular entertainer.

Dick continued to perform through the 1930s, making few changes to his established routines, and appeared in his second Royal Variety Performance in 1946. He married Winifred Dunn in 1918; she outlived him. They had twin daughters, Winifred (Wyn) and Clare (known as Triss) in 1920; they became singers and dancers with the Jack Hylton orchestra. Their son Dickie was born in 1922, and his father actively supported his career.

Dick Henderson died in Paddington, London in 1958, aged 67 and was buried at St. Mary's Roman Catholic Cemetery, Kensal Green.
