= Alice Henderson (novelist) =

American author

Alice Henderson is an American author currently residing in San Francisco.

In addition to being a writer, Henderson holds an interdisciplinary master's degree with studies in physical geography and folklore, and an undergraduate degree with studies in writing, field zoology, biogeography, and paleontology. She is a wildlife researcher and bioacoustician, and works with GIS. She wrote material for Star Wars video games when she worked at LucasArts.

== Selected works ==
=== Buffyverse ===
Novels relating to the fictional universe established by Buffy and Angel:

- Night Terrors (2005)
- Portal Through Time (2006)

=== Alex Carter series ===
- A Solitude of Wolverines (2020)
- A Blizzard of Polar Bears (2021)
- A Ghost of Caribou (2022)
- The Vanishing Kind (2025)
- Storm Warning (2026)
- Dangerous Ground (2027)

=== Skyfire Saga trilogy ===
- Shattered Roads (2018)
- Shattered Lands (2018)
- Shattered Skies (2019)

=== Other works ===
- Unspeakable Limericks
- "Mansion of Ghoulish Delight," a story in Mystery Date (2008)
- Voracious (2009)
- "Mandible," a story in Werewolves and Other Shapeshifters (2010)
- "Residue," a story in Body Horror (2012)
- "The Wreck," a story in Creepy #6 (2013)
- Fresh Meat – a Supernatural novel (2013)
- Aquatic Bourne (2015)
