= Paul Henderson (cricketer) =

English cricketer

Paul Henderson (born 22 October 1974) is an English former cricketer. He was a right-handed batsman and a right-arm medium-fast bowler. Henderson played first-class and List A cricket for Durham in 1992. He was born in Stockton-on-Tees.

Henderson had in fact started playing for Durham in 1991, but as the team had not entered the County Championship at this point, the games were all part of the Minor Counties Championship.

Following his departure from the first team at the end of the 1992 season, in which Durham finished bottom of the table with just two wins from 22 games, Henderson played two further seasons of Second XI cricket. Henderson was an upper-middle order batsman and an occasional bowler for the Durham team.
