= Alice Wonder Land =

American singer

Alice Wonder Land was the pseudonym of Alice Faye Henderson, a one-hit wonder who recorded a 1963 hit song, "He's Mine (I Love Him, I Love Him, I Love Him)". The name refers to Lewis Carroll's classic book Alice's Adventures in Wonderland.

In 1963, Henderson was working as a maid for a neighbor of Stephen Schlaks, a songwriter and co-owner of Bardell Records. Schlaks signed Henderson to record "He's Mine".

Little Eva had recently had a hit with "The Loco-Motion," after being discovered by Carole King, for whom she babysat. It has been suggested that Schlaks modeled the entire Alice Wonder Land persona after Little Eva.
