= George Francis Robert Henderson =

British Army officer and author (1854–1903)

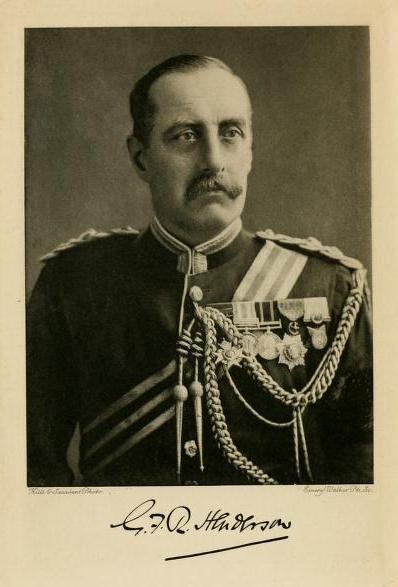
A photograph of Henderson

Colonel George Francis Robert Henderson, CB (2 June 1854 – 5 March 1903) was a British Army officer and author best known for writing Stonewall Jackson and the American Civil War (1898).

== Early life ==
Henderson was born in Saint Helier, Jersey on 2 June 1854. His father was William George Henderson, later Dean of Carlisle, and Jane Melville Dalyell, Educated at Leeds Grammar School, of which his father was headmaster, he was early attracted to the study of history. He obtained a scholarship at St John's College, Oxford. But he soon left the university for Sandhurst, where he was commissioned into the British Army's 84th Regiment of Foot in 1878.

== Military service ==
After a few months of service in India, he was promoted to the rank of lieutenant and returned to England, and in 1882 he went on active service to Egypt, fighting in the battles of Kassassin and Tel el-Kebir. During this time, he received numerous citations for bravery in combat, being promoted to captain in 1886. In 1885 he was seconded to the Ordnance Store Department. In 1889 appeared (anonymously) his first work, The Campaign of Fredericksburg. In the same year, he became an Instructor in Tactics, Military Law, and Administration at Sandhurst. From this post, he proceeded as Professor of Military Art and History to the Staff College (1892–1899), where he exercised a profound influence on the younger generation of officers. His study on the Battle of Spicheren had been begun some years before. Then in 1898 appeared, as the result of eight years of work, his masterpiece: Stonewall Jackson and the American Civil War.

== Later life and death ==
In the Second Boer War, Henderson served with distinction on the staff of the Commander-in-Chief, Lord Roberts, as Director of Intelligence, and was promoted to lieutenant-colonel on 23 December 1899. He received the local rank of colonel whilst in South Africa only weeks later, on 10 January 1900. In a despatch dated 31 March 1900, Lord Roberts wrote that Henderson gave him "valuable and reliable information regarding the physical features of the country and the disposition of the enemy".

However, overwork and malaria broke his health, and he had to return home in January 1902, being eventually selected to write the official history of the war. Failing health obliged him to go to Egypt, where he died at Assuan on 5 March 1903. He had completed the portion of the history of the South African War dealing with the events up to the commencement of hostilities, amounting to about a volume, but the War Office decided to suppress this, and the work was restarted by Sir F. Maurice.

== Legacy ==
Various lectures and papers by Henderson were collected and published in 1905 by Captain Malcolm, D.S.O., under the title The Science of War; to this collection a memoir was contributed by Lord Roberts.

== Notes ==
Military offices
New title Start of Boer War	Director of Military Intelligence; For the Boer War; 1899–1900	Succeeded by C V Hume
