= Dickie Henderson =

English music hall comedian and singer (1922–1985)

Dickie Henderson OBE
- Born: Richard Matthew Michael Henderson; 30 October 1922; London, England
- Died: 22 September 1985 (aged 62); Essex, England
- Occupations: Comedian; actor; singer; dancer; entertainer
- Spouse(s): Dixie Ross (m.1948–1963; her death); Gwynneth Wycherley (m.1965–1985; his death)
- Children: 2

Richard Matthew Michael Henderson, OBE (30 October 1922 – 22 September 1985) was an English entertainer.

== Early years ==
Henderson was born in London. His father, Dick Henderson (1891–1958), was a music hall comedian and singer famous for his short, rotund appearance, bowler hat and beautiful singing voice; he was well known for making the original British recording of the popular song "Tiptoe Through the Tulips". His two sisters Winifred and Teresa ('Triss') known as "the Henderson Twins", were also performers in the style of the Andrews Sisters.

Henderson was privately educated in both Hollywood, when his father was touring in vaudeville, and Britain, at St Joseph's College, Beulah Hill, London.

== Career ==
In America, Henderson broke into show business, aged 10, when he was offered a role as the son of Clive Brook and Diana Wynyard in the Frank Lloyd film version of Noël Coward's play, Cavalcade (1933).

He was also in the running for the part of David Copperfield in George Cukor's film of the same name, but his father insisted that he decline the part and return to Britain, because he felt Hollywood was not the place for a young boy. Henderson Jr. toured in music halls and appeared in several films with his famous father.

Dickie Henderson served in the Army during the Second World War, before appearing in revues, pantomimes and occasional films after demobilisation. He began a successful television career in 1953, with Face the Music, followed by appearing in Before Your Very Eyes with Arthur Askey. He compered Sunday Night at the London Palladium.

He starred in his own ITV television programme: The Dickie Henderson Half Hour in 1958, the success of which led to a touring stage show with Anthea Askey who played his wife, and their eventual immortalisation in a comic strip. He then starred in 84 episodes of The Dickie Henderson Show. In this sitcom, June Laverick played his wife and John Parsons played their son. Lionel Murton starred as Dickie's friend Jack, and Danny Grover played Richard Jr. There were five shows in 1960, twenty-three in 1961, twelve in 1962, twenty-two in 1963, ten in 1964 and eleven in 1965. There was another single show in 1971.

Other television work included a series of A Present for Dickie, several spectaculars and a famous partnership with Bob Monkhouse in I'm Bob, He's Dickie followed by I'm Dickie – That's Showbusiness. He went on to make many stage appearances including 20 months in the original London production of Teahouse of the August Moon, followed by When in Rome, Stand by your Bedouin and And the Bridge Makes Three. He also made many working trips abroad to the United States, Canada, Australia, South Africa, Hong Kong and the Netherlands.

== Other ==
Henderson appeared in eight Royal Command Performances. A keen golfer, Henderson enjoyed most sports. He was a leading Water Rat and was awarded the OBE in recognition of his charitable work.

== Family ==
He married Dixie Ross, a member of the three Ross Sisters, whose act combined singing, acrobatics and contortionism; at the time of their marriage she used the name Veda, taken from that of her sister. They had a son and a daughter. After the death of his first wife from a barbiturate overdose in 1963, he remarried in 1965, to Gwynneth Wycherley.

== Death ==
Dickie Henderson died in Essex from pancreatic cancer on 22 September 1985, aged 62.

== Filmography ==
Year	Title	Role	Notes
1933	Cavalcade	Master Edward	
1935	Things Are Looking Up	Mr. Money's Son	
1957	Time Without Pity	Comedian	
1959	Make Mine a Million	Self - Cameo appearance	
