= Thomas J. Henderson (activist) =

American activist and businessman (1931–2005)

Thomas J. Henderson (2 March 1931 – 14 February 2005) was an American activist and business manager.

Henderson was born in Winona, Minnesota and attended Amherst College before receiving a BS and MS from MIT. He worked in the construction trade for many years, becoming CEO of Guy F. Atkinson Co. He was involved in numerous large construction projects, including the Big Dig of Boston and the Oakland-Alameda Coliseum.

Henderson also served as the president of the local chapter of PFLAG, the chairman of the Pacific School of Religion, and the national chairman of the YMCA. His wife, Mitzi Henderson, was the national president of PFLAG in the early 1990s.
