= Reach =

Reach, REACH, or The Reach may refer to:

== Books ==
- Halo: The Fall of Reach, a novel written by Eric Nylund for the Halo series, published in 2001.

== Companies and organizations ==
- Reach plc, formerly Trinity Mirror, large British newspaper, magazine, and digital publisher
- Reach Canada, an NGO in Canada
- Reach Limited, an Asia Pacific cable network company
- The Reach Foundation, a charitable organization in Australia
- REACH (Singapore), a department under the Ministry of Communications and Information of Singapore
- Reach for the Top, a Canadian high school trivia competition

== Video games ==
- Halo: Reach, a 2010 video game in the Halo series set on the fictional planet Reach
- Park Jung-suk (gamer) or Reach, professional StarCraft player

== Music ==
=== Albums ===
- Reach (Eyes Set to Kill album) (2008)
- Reach (Meredith Edwards album) (2001)
- Reach (Survivor album) (2006)
- Reach (Jacky Terrasson album) (1995)

=== Songs ===
- "Reach" (Orleans song) (1976)
- "Reach" (Gloria Estefan song), the 1996 Summer Olympics official song
- "Reach" (Eyes Set to Kill song) (2008)
- "Reach" (Nightwish song) (2007)
- "Reach" (S Club 7 song) (2000)
- "Reach", a song by Collective Soul from Hints Allegations and Things Left Unsaid
- "Reach", a 2011 song by Peter Furler from On Fire
- "Reach", a 1982 song by Martini Ranch
- "The Reach", a 1981 song by Dan Fogelberg from The Innocent Age
- "Reach", a 2016 song by Neurosis from Fires Within Fires

== Places ==
- Reach, Ontario, in Canada
- Reach, Cambridgeshire, a village in England

== Other ==
- Reach (boxing), total length of a boxer's arms
- Reach (advertising), a measure of the size of an audience
- Reach (brand), a brand of oral hygiene products
- Reach (comics), a fictional alien race in the DC Comics universe
- Reach (geography), an expanse, or widening, of a stream or river channel
- Reach (mathematics), a geometric property of a set
- "The Reach", a 1981 short story by Stephen King
- The Reach, an expansion of The John F. Kennedy Center for the Performing Arts completed in 2019
- The Reach Gallery Museum, Abbotsford, British Columbia, Canada
- Beyond the Reach (working title The Reach), a 2014 film starring Michael Douglas
- Canal reach, the section of a canal between two locks
- REACH regulation: the European Union regulation for Registration, Evaluation, Authorisation and Restriction of Chemicals
- Arm span, or reach, measured from fingertip to fingertip, important in boxing, basketball
- Reachability or reach, the st-connectivity problem
- Dutch Reach, a car door-opening method to reduce the likelihood of dooring
- Isuzu Reach, a 2011–present American walk-through delivery van
- Reach (Podcast), a children's podcast about space

== See also ==
- Reaching (disambiguation)
