= William Henderson (architect) =

Canadian architect

- Born: February 26, 1837; Aberdeenshire Scotland
- Died: September 24, 1931 (aged 94); British Columbia, Canada
- Occupation: Architect
- Notable work: Government House (Saskatchewan)
- Children: Stuart Alexander Henderson, Gordon Smith Henderson
- Relatives: Gordon F. Henderson (grandson)

William Henderson (February 26, 1837 – September 24, 1931) was a Scottish-born architect who mainly worked in Canada. He was the Resident Architect for the Department of Public Works in British Columbia.

== Life and career ==
Henderson was born in Lonmay, Aberdeenshire, to a family of architects. He became a stone cutter at the age of 13, and in 1857, he emigrated to Canada. In 1861 he moved back to Scotland, where he married his first wife, Mary Jane Smith. They had three children together, including Stuart Alexander Henderson and Gordon Smith Henderson.

In 1872 he moved back to Ottawa as an overseer for the Federal department of public works in Canada. Henderson remained in government until 1887, when he started his own general construction business. During this time, he completed independent commissions for new buildings in Regina and Qu'Appelle. In 1896 he was appointed Resident Architect for the Territories and, in June 1897, became Resident Architect for the Dept. of Public Works for British Columbia. This position meant he was responsible as site supervisor for all federal buildings being built in the province. He held that position until he retired in 1925.

In public life, he was an alderman at Oak Bay from 1906–08 and later a reeve. He was the Grand Master of the Masonic Lodge British Columbia in 1913. He died in 1931.

== Legacy ==
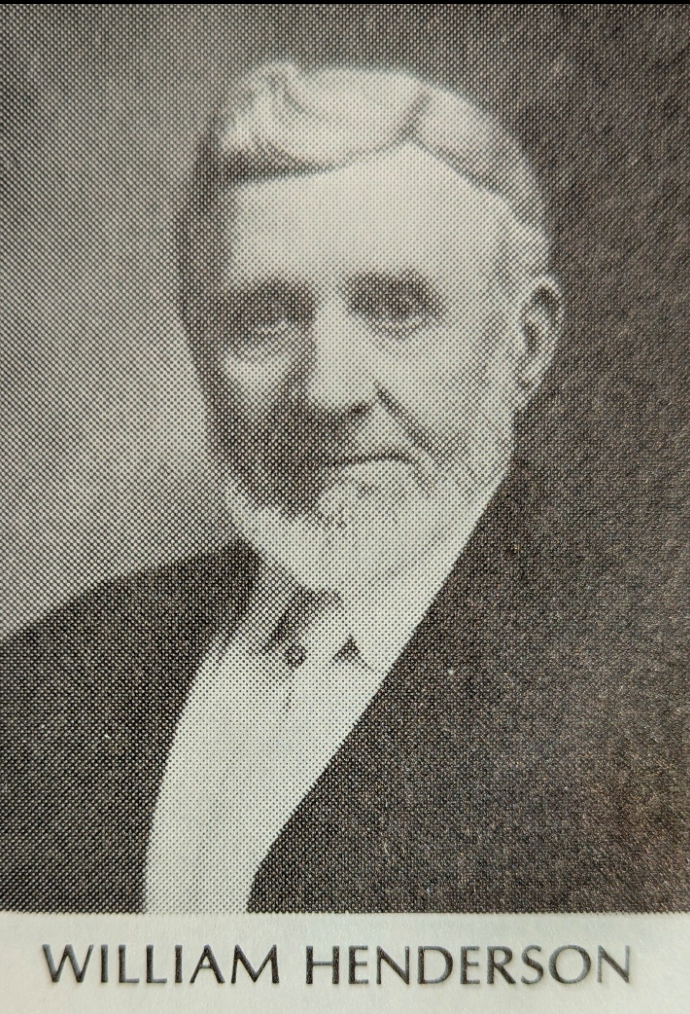

A biographer described Henderson as " highly respected and admired, and his record in public life, as well as his efforts in behalf of all movements tending towards the moral uplift of the community, places him in the foremost rank of Victoria's estimable citizens." Henderson Hall and Henderson road in Oak Bay were both named for him.

== Structures ==
=== Independent ===
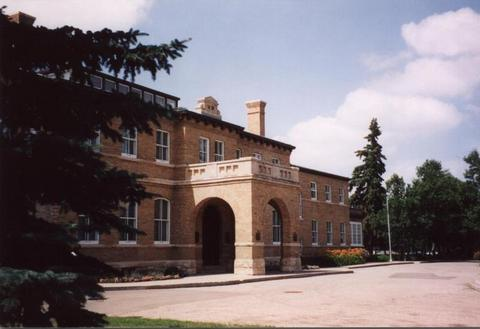
Government House, Regina, Saskatchewan

Location	Building	Date
(Saskatchewan) Qu'Appelle Station	St Peters Anglican Church	1885
(Saskatchewan) Regina	Government House	1889
(Saskatchewan) Moose Jaw	Public School	1890
(Saskatchewan) Qu'Appelle	Two storey commercial block for Alexander McKenzie	1893
(British Columbia) New Westminster	Parish Hall for Holy Trinity Anglican Cathedral	1902
(Alberta) Lethbridge	Hotel Lethbridge	1903
(British Columbia) Oak Bay	Residence for the Architect	1910
(British Columbia) Oak Bay	St. Columba Presbyterian Church	1914

=== Government ===
Location	Building	Date
(British Columbia) William Head	Quarantine Station	1905
(British Columbia) Osoyoos	Customs house	1906-07
(British Columbia) Victoria	Detention Building	1907-08
(British Columbia) Revelstoke	Post Office and Government Offices	1911
(British Columbia) Duncan	Post Office and Indian Affairs Building	1912-13
(British Columbia) Union Bay	Dominion Public Building	1913
(British Columbia) Port Alberni	Dominion Public Building	1914-1915

== Descendants ==
William Henderson (26 February 1837 – 24 September 1931) m. Mary Jane Smith (1862–1904), Caroline D'Aguilar (1917–1931)
  - Stuart Alexander Henderson (19 September 1863 – 17 February 1945) m. Alice London (1890–), Mary Jane Losh (1904–)
  - Dr. Gordon Smith Henderson KC (10 July 1866 – 16 July 1938) m. Charlotte Stratton
    - Gordon F. Henderson CC QC (17 April 1912 – 17 August 1993) m. Joan Parkins (1942–1993)
      - Joanne Nelson (1946) m. Robert Nelson of the Nelson family
        - Meredith Nelson
        - Gregor Nelson
        - Gordon Nelson
      - Gordon Henderson
        - Stuart Henderson
        - Kate Henderson
        - Elizabeth Henderson
      - Robert Henderson
        - Ceilidh Henderson
        - Meghan Henderson
        - Quinn Henderson
  - Mary Jane Henderson (23 December 1870 – 13 August 1919) m. William Cruckshank, Claude Rogers
