= Cooper Island =

Cooper Island may refer to:

- Cooper Island (South Georgia), an island and Special Protection Area off the southeast end of South Georgia.
- Cooper Island (British Virgin Islands)
- Cooper Island (New Zealand)
- Cooper Island (Palmyra Atoll)
- Cooper Islands, Alaska, US
- Cooper's Island, Bermuda

== See also ==
- Couper Islands, Nunavut, Canada
- Copper Island (disambiguation)
