= Rob Stewart Award =

Annual Canadian television award

- Country: Canada
- Presented by: Academy of Canadian Cinema & Television
- First award: 1995
- Currently held by: The Birdman of Cooper Island (2025)
- Website: academy.ca/awards

The Rob Stewart Award, formerly known as the Gemini/Canadian Screen Award for Best Science or Nature Documentary Program, is a Canadian television award, presented by the Academy of Canadian Cinema and Television to honour the year's best television documentary on a scientific or nature topic. Formerly presented as part of the Gemini Awards, since 2013 it has been presented as part of the Canadian Screen Awards. The award is open to both standalone documentary films and relevant episodes of television documentary series; in particular, episodes of the CBC Television documentary series The Nature of Things have frequently been nominees for or winners of the award.

The award was renamed to its current name in 2017 in memory of Rob Stewart, an influential Canadian director of science and nature documentary films who died in January 2017.

== Nominees and winners ==
=== 1990s ===
| Year | Film | Filmmakers |
|---|---|---|
1995; 10th Gemini Awards
| 1995; 10th Gemini Awards | Epilepsy: The Centre of Her Storms | David Way, Wally Longul |
| 1995; 10th Gemini Awards | Cyberwars: Binary Groove | Alan White, Eric Calvert |
| 1995; 10th Gemini Awards | Forbidden Places: "Silent Witness" | Aiken Scherberger |
| 1995; 10th Gemini Awards | Forbidden Places: "Zone of Separation" | Aiken Scherberger |
| 1995; 10th Gemini Awards | Whisper in the Air | Angela Gwynn John, Michael Betcherman, Tom Perlmutter |
1996; 11th Gemini Awards
| 1996; 11th Gemini Awards | Ebola: Inside an Outbreak | Elliott Halpern, Simcha Jacobovici, Ric Esther Bienstock |
| 1996; 11th Gemini Awards | Heart of the People | Peter von Puttkamer, Sheera von Puttkamer |
| 1996; 11th Gemini Awards | In My Own Time: Diary of a Cancer Patient | Jerry Krepakevich, Graydon McCrea, Joseph Viszmeg |
| 1996; 11th Gemini Awards | The Living Tides of Fundy | Stuart Beecroft |
| 1996; 11th Gemini Awards | The Nature of Things: "Food or Famine" | John Bassett |
1997; 12th Gemini Awards
| 1997; 12th Gemini Awards | Separate Lives | Robert Lang |
| 1997; 12th Gemini Awards | Forbidden Places: "Wildkill" | Aiken Scherberger |
| 1997; 12th Gemini Awards | Journeys: "Volcano" | Lauren Millar, Craig Moffat |
| 1997; 12th Gemini Awards | Life and Times: "Roberta Bondar, Lone Star" | Ann Kennard |
| 1997; 12th Gemini Awards | Secrets of the Choco | Ian McLaren |
| 1997; 12th Gemini Awards | The Empty Net | Richard Elson |
1998; 13th Gemini Awards
| 1998; 13th Gemini Awards | Before Their Time | Rudy Buttignol, David Way, Steven Manuel |
| 1998; 13th Gemini Awards | Ellesmere Island National Park Reserve | Mitchell Azaria |
| 1998; 13th Gemini Awards | Superbugs | Gordon Henderson |
| 1998; 13th Gemini Awards | The Monarch: A Butterfly Beyond Borders | David Springbett, Heather MacAndrew |
| 1998; 13th Gemini Awards | Witness: "Quake Hunters" | Terence McKeown |
1999; 14th Gemini Awards
| 1999; 14th Gemini Awards | My Healing Journey: Seven Years with Cancer | Jerry Krepakevich |
| 1999; 14th Gemini Awards | Baboon Tales | Rudolf Kovanic, Gillian Darling-Kovanic |
| 1999; 14th Gemini Awards | The Nature of Things: "Up Close and Personal" | Caroline Underwood |
| 1999; 14th Gemini Awards | The Pill | Joe MacDonald |
| 1999; 14th Gemini Awards | Walking with Grizzlies | Ian Herring |

=== 2000s ===
| Year | Film | Filmmakers |
|---|---|---|
2000; 15th Gemini Awards
| 2000; 15th Gemini Awards | After Darwin | Arnie Gelbart |
| 2000; 15th Gemini Awards | Edge of Extinction: Saving the Leatherback Sea Turtle | Ira Levy, Peter Williamson, Andrea Boyd, Stuart Goodman |
| 2000; 15th Gemini Awards | Tatshenshini-Alsek Park: Heart of the Wilderness | Mitchell Azaria, Ihor Macijiwsky |
| 2000; 15th Gemini Awards | The Nature of Things: "Parkinson's: Lynda's Story" | David Tucker |
| 2000; 15th Gemini Awards | The Secret World of Gardens | Susan Fleming |
2001; 16th Gemini Awards
| 2001; 16th Gemini Awards | The Nature of Things: Nuclear Dynamite" | Selwyn Jacob, Gary Marcuse, Betsy Carson |
| 2001; 16th Gemini Awards | Criminal Evidence | Elliott Halpern, Simcha Jacobovici, Roger Pyke, Jack Rabinovitch, Pauline Duffy |
| 2001; 16th Gemini Awards | Echoes of the North | Ralph C. Ellis, Stephen Ellis |
| 2001; 16th Gemini Awards | Insectia: Outlaws | Jacquelin Bouchard, Mary Armstrong, André Barro, Fabienne Servan-Schreiber |
| 2001; 16th Gemini Awards | Movers, Not Shakers | David Langer, Laszlo Barna, Sam Grana, Jim Hogan |
| 2001; 16th Gemini Awards | The Nature of Things: "The Salmon Forest" | Caroline Underwood |
2002; 17th Gemini Awards
| 2002; 17th Gemini Awards | The Secret World of Gardens: "Frogs" | Susan Fleming |
| 2002; 17th Gemini Awards | Bushmeat: The Slaughter of the Apes | Dawna Treibicz, John Panikkar |
| 2002; 17th Gemini Awards | The Cold Embrace | Andrew Gregg, Gordon Henderson |
| 2002; 17th Gemini Awards | The Parkinson's Enigma | Bette Thompson, Terence McKeown |
| 2002; 17th Gemini Awards | The Nature of Things: "Touch: The Forgotten Sense" | Roger Frappier, Jean Lemire |
2003; 18th Gemini Awards
| 2003; 18th Gemini Awards | The Nature of Things: "The Investigation of Swiss Air Flight 111" | Howard Green, Michael Allder, Kurt Schaad |
| 2003; 18th Gemini Awards | Life's a Twitch | Tina Hahn, Sally Blake, Rudy Buttignol |
| 2003; 18th Gemini Awards | Oh Baby! To Walk | Stephen Ellis, Kip Spidell |
| 2003; 18th Gemini Awards | The Nature of Things: "Up Close and Toxic" | Caroline Underwood, Michael Allder |
| 2003; 18th Gemini Awards | The Surgeons: "Dr. Rao" | Tim O'Brien, Rachel Low, Daniela Battistella |
2004; 19th Gemini Awards
| 2004; 19th Gemini Awards | Suzuki Speaks | Tony Papa, Cathy Chilco |
| 2004; 19th Gemini Awards | The Eye of the Son | Robbie Hart, Jason Rodi, Rudy Buttignol |
| 2004; 19th Gemini Awards | The Nature of Things: "Corporate Agriculture: The Hollow Men" | Ray Burley, Michael Allder |
| 2004; 19th Gemini Awards | The Secret World of Gardens: "Garden Mimics" | Susan Fleming |
| 2004; 19th Gemini Awards | Sex, Drugs and Middle Age | Ann Marie Redmond |
2005; 20th Gemini Awards
| 2005; 20th Gemini Awards | The Origins of AIDS | Christine Le Goff, Michel Crepon, Arnie Gelbart, Christine Pireaux |
| 2005; 20th Gemini Awards | A Day Inside: Calgary Stampede | Lance Mueller, Jean Merriman |
| 2005; 20th Gemini Awards | Diet of Souls | Peter d'Entremont |
| 2005; 20th Gemini Awards | The Nature of Things: "Clot Busters" | David Tucker, Michael Allder |
| 2005; 20th Gemini Awards | The Nature of Things: "Sex Lies and Secrecy: Dissecting Hysterectomy" | Michael Allder, Carol Moore-Ede |
2006; 21st Gemini Awards
| 2006; 21st Gemini Awards | The Nature of Things: "Being Caribou" | Rina Fraticelli, Tracey Friesen |
| 2006; 21st Gemini Awards | The Fifth Estate: "Black Dawn" | Douglas Arrowsmith, Jane Mingay, David Studer, Jim Williamson |
| 2006; 21st Gemini Awards | How William Shatner Changed the World | Malcolm Clark, Alan Handel |
| 2006; 21st Gemini Awards | Lifelike | Nathalie Barton |
| 2006; 21st Gemini Awards | The Nature of Things: "Nature Bites Back: The Case of the Sea Otter" | Christopher Sumpton |
2007; 22nd Gemini Awards
| 2007; 22nd Gemini Awards | Gamer Revolution | Rachel Low, Marc De Guerre |
| 2007; 22nd Gemini Awards | Spam: The Documentary | Andrew Johnson, Jeannette Loakman, Scott Dobson, Sally Blake |
| 2007; 22nd Gemini Awards | There's Something Out There: A Bigfoot Encounter | Kyle Bornais |
| 2007; 22nd Gemini Awards | Tsepong: A Clinic Called Hope | Peter Raymont |
| 2007; 22nd Gemini Awards | The Wayfinders | Andrew Gregg, Gordon Henderson, Wade Davis |
2008; 23rd Gemini Awards
| 2008; 23rd Gemini Awards | Battle of the Bag | Ryszard Hunka, Monika Delmos |
| 2008; 23rd Gemini Awards | Four Wings and a Prayer | Michael McMahon, Kristina McLaughlin, Gerry Flahive, Emmanuel Laurent, David Johnston |
| 2008; 23rd Gemini Awards | Hubble's Canvas | Craig Colby, Ivan Semeniuk |
| 2008; 23rd Gemini Awards | Long Haul Big Hearts | Doug Raby, Joanne P. Jackson, Joan Jenkinson |
| 2008; 23rd Gemini Awards | The Refugees of the Blue Planet | Monique Simard, Marcel Simard, Yves Bisaillon, Luc Martin-Gousset |
2009; 24th Gemini Awards
| 2009; 24th Gemini Awards | The Disappearing Male | Rachel Low, Alan Mendelsohn |
| 2009; 24th Gemini Awards | The Body Machine | Mary Barroll, Malcolm Brinkworth |
| 2009; 24th Gemini Awards | Mighty Ships: "Resolute" | Kathryn Oughtred, Richard O'Regan, Phil Desjardins |
| 2009; 24th Gemini Awards | The Musical Brain | Vanessa Dylyn |
| 2009; 24th Gemini Awards | Secrets of the Dinosaur Mummy | Michael Jorgensen, Kevin Dunn |

=== 2010s ===
| Year | Film | Filmmakers |
|---|---|---|
2010; 25th Gemini Awards
| 2010; 25th Gemini Awards | The Great Sperm Race | David Brady, Christopher Rowley |
| 2010; 25th Gemini Awards | The Nature of Things: "A Murder of Crows" | Susan Fleming |
| 2010; 25th Gemini Awards | The Nature of Things: "One Ocean: Mysteries of the Deep" | Merit Jensen Carr, Caroline Underwood, Michael Allder |
| 2010; 25th Gemini Awards | The Plastic Fantastic Brain: Total Recall and the Spotless Mind | Paul Kemp, Brian Cotter |
| 2010; 25th Gemini Awards | The Quantum Tamers: Revealing our Weird and Wired Future | Derek Diorio, John Matlock, Frank Taylor |
2011; 26th Gemini Awards
| 2011; 26th Gemini Awards | The Nature of Things: "Code Breakers" | Niobe Thompson, Tom Radford |
| 2011; 26th Gemini Awards | Acquainted with the Night | Judy Holm, Michael McNamara |
| 2011; 26th Gemini Awards | The Nature of Things: "For the Love of Elephants" | Rod Ruel, Lynn Booth |
| 2011; 26th Gemini Awards | Last Day of the Dinosaurs | Alan Handel, Tim Goodchild, Richard Dale |
| 2011; 26th Gemini Awards | X-Cars | Kelly McClughan, Sue Ridout |
2012; 1st Canadian Screen Awards
| 2012; 1st Canadian Screen Awards | The Nature of Things: "Polar Bears: A Summer Odyssey" | Sarah Robertson, Tim O'Brien |
| 2012; 1st Canadian Screen Awards | Descending | Jeff Wilson, Jennifer Howe |
| 2012; 1st Canadian Screen Awards | The Nature of Things: "The Perfect Runner" | Niobe Thompson, Tom Radford |
| 2012; 1st Canadian Screen Awards | The Nature of Things: "Smarty Plants: Uncovering the Secret World of Plant Behavior" | Merit Jensen Carr |
| 2012; 1st Canadian Screen Awards | When Dreams Take Flight | Sheona McDonald, Bob Culbert, Adamm Liley |
2013; 2nd Canadian Screen Awards
| 2013; 2nd Canadian Screen Awards | Aliens: The Definitive Guide | Alan Handel, Tom Brisley |
| 2013; 2nd Canadian Screen Awards | The Nature of Things: "The Beaver Whisperers" | Jari Osborne |
| 2013; 2nd Canadian Screen Awards | The Nature of Things: "Lights Out!" | Judy Holm, Michael McNamara |
| 2013; 2nd Canadian Screen Awards | Doc Zone: "Wind Rush" | Andrew Gregg, Gordon Henderson |
2014; 3rd Canadian Screen Awards
| 2014; 3rd Canadian Screen Awards | The Nature of Things: "Invasion of the Brain Snatchers" | Sue Dando, Mike Downie, F. M. Morrison, David Wells |
| 2014; 3rd Canadian Screen Awards | Mission Asteroid | J. R. McConvey, Jeff Thrasher |
| 2014; 3rd Canadian Screen Awards | Secrets in the Bones: The Hunt for the Black Death Killer | Dugald Maudsley |
| 2014; 3rd Canadian Screen Awards | Wild Canada | Brian Leith, Jeff Turner |
| 2014; 3rd Canadian Screen Awards | Wild Things with Dominic Monaghan | David Brady, Kate Harrison, Dominic Monaghan, Philip Clarke |
2015; 4th Canadian Screen Awards
| 2015; 4th Canadian Screen Awards | The Nature of Things: "The Great Human Odyssey" | Niobe Thompson |
| 2015; 4th Canadian Screen Awards | Bad Coyote | Paul McNeill, Jason Andrew Young |
| 2015; 4th Canadian Screen Awards | The Nature of Things: "The Cholesterol Question" | Aaron Hancox, Judy Holm, Michael McNamara |
| 2015; 4th Canadian Screen Awards | The Nature of Things: "Gorilla Doctors" | Bryn Hughes, David York |
| 2015; 4th Canadian Screen Awards | The Water Brothers | Jonathan Barker, Jane Jankovic, Wendy MacKeigan |
2016; 5th Canadian Screen Awards
| 2016; 5th Canadian Screen Awards | The Nature of Things: "Moose: A Year in the Life of a Twig Eater" | Susan Fleming |
| 2016; 5th Canadian Screen Awards | Kenya Wildlife Diaries | Craig Colby, Michael Dalton-Smith |
| 2016; 5th Canadian Screen Awards | The Nature of Things: "My Brain Made Me Do It" | Erna Buffie, Merit Jensen Carr |
| 2016; 5th Canadian Screen Awards | The Nature of Things: "Trapped in a Human Zoo" | Roch Brunette, Guilhem Rondot |
| 2016; 5th Canadian Screen Awards | Volcanic Odysseys | Craig Colby, Michael Dalton-Smith |
2017; 6th Canadian Screen Awards
| 2017; 6th Canadian Screen Awards | The Nature of Things: "The Wild Canadian Year" | Jeff Turner, Sue Turner, Caroline Underwood |
| 2017; 6th Canadian Screen Awards | Call of the Forest: The Forgotten Wisdom of Trees | Merit Jensen Carr, Jeff McKay |
| 2017; 6th Canadian Screen Awards | The Nature of Things: "The Great Wild Indoors" | David York, Bryn Hughes, Roberto Verdecchia |
| 2017; 6th Canadian Screen Awards | The Nature of Things: "Running on Empty: Surviving California's Epic Drought" | Mike Downie, David Wells |
| 2017; 6th Canadian Screen Awards | The Water Brothers | Jonathan Barker, Wendy MacKeigan, Jane Jankovic |
2018; 7th Canadian Screen Awards
| 2018; 7th Canadian Screen Awards | The Nature of Things: "Equus: Story of the Horse" | Niobe Thompson, Caroline Underwood |
| 2018; 7th Canadian Screen Awards | The Nature of Things: "Into the Fire" | Gordon Henderson, Leora Eisen |
| 2018; 7th Canadian Screen Awards | The Nature of Things: "The Kingdom: How Fungi Made our World" | Anne Pick, Bill Spahic |
| 2018; 7th Canadian Screen Awards | The Nature of Things: "Mommy Wildest" | Caitlin Starowicz, Mark Starowicz |
| 2018; 7th Canadian Screen Awards | Over the Horizon | Jennifer Howe, Craig McGillivray, Ira Levy |
2019; 8th Canadian Screen Awards
| 2019; 8th Canadian Screen Awards | The Nature of Things: "A Day in the Life of Earth" | Elliott Halpern, Elizabeth Trojian |
| 2019; 8th Canadian Screen Awards | Equator: A New World View | Kevin McMahon, Michael McMahon, Kristina McLaughlin |
| 2019; 8th Canadian Screen Awards | The Nature of Things: "The Genetic Revolution" | Elliott Halpern, Elizabeth Trojian |
| 2019; 8th Canadian Screen Awards | The Nature of Things: "Remarkable Rabbits" | Susan Fleming |
| 2019; 8th Canadian Screen Awards | The Nature of Things: "Turtle Beach" | Merit Jensen Carr |

=== 2020s ===
| Year | Film | Filmmakers | Ref |
|---|---|---|---|
2020; 9th Canadian Screen Awards
| 2020; 9th Canadian Screen Awards | The Nature of Things: "Takaya: Lone Wolf" | André Barro, Martin Williams, Cheryl Alexander, Bruce Whitty, Kim Bondi, Gaby Bastyra | |
| 2020; 9th Canadian Screen Awards | The Nature of Things: "Be Afraid: The Science of Fear" | Gordon Henderson, Stuart Henderson, Rita Kotzia | |
| 2020; 9th Canadian Screen Awards | The Nature of Things: "Pass the Salt" | Judy Holm, Michael McNamara, Aaron Hancox | |
| 2020; 9th Canadian Screen Awards | The Nature of Things: "She Walks with Apes" | Mark Starowicz, Caitlin Starowicz | |
| 2020; 9th Canadian Screen Awards | Striking Balance | Yvonne Drebert | |
2021; 10th Canadian Screen Awards
| 2021; 10th Canadian Screen Awards | Borealis | Kevin McMahon, Michael McMahon, Kristina McLaughlin, Justine Pimlott, Felicity Justrabo | |
| 2021; 10th Canadian Screen Awards | The Nature of Things: "Inside The Great Vaccine Race" | Dugald Maudsley, Gillian Main | |
| 2021; 10th Canadian Screen Awards | The Nature of Things: "Kids vs. Screens" | Leora Eisen, Jackie Carlos, Diana Warmé | |
| 2021; 10th Canadian Screen Awards | The Nature of Things: "Kingdom of the Polar Bears" | Merit Jensen Carr, Sally Blake, Patrice Lorton | |
| 2021; 10th Canadian Screen Awards | The Nature of Things: "The Last Walrus" | Nathalie Bibeau, Frederic Bohbot | |
2022; 11th Canadian Screen Awards
| 2022; 11th Canadian Screen Awards | The Nature of Things: "Ice and Fire: Tracking Canada's Climate Crisis" | Elliott Halpern, Elizabeth Trojian | |
| 2022; 11th Canadian Screen Awards | The Mightiest | Chris Perez, Marcelle Edwards, Manny Groneveldt | |
| 2022; 11th Canadian Screen Awards | The Nature of Things: "Carbon: The Unauthorized Biography" | Niobe Thompson | |
| 2022; 11th Canadian Screen Awards | The Nature of Things: "Curb Your Carbon" | Dugald Maudsley, Gillian Main | |
| 2022; 11th Canadian Screen Awards | The Nature of Things: "Nature's Big Year" | Christine Nielsen, Diana Warmé | |
2023; 12th Canadian Screen Awards
| 2023; 12th Canadian Screen Awards | The Water Brothers | Wendy MacKeigan, Tyler Mifflin, Alex Mifflin | |
| 2023; 12th Canadian Screen Awards | Ageless Gardens | Ian Toews, Mark Bradley, Moses Znaimer, Beverley Shenken | |
| 2023; 12th Canadian Screen Awards | The Nature of Things: "Apocalypse, Plan B" | Caitlin Starowicz, Mark Starowicz | |
| 2023; 12th Canadian Screen Awards | The Nature of Things: "True Survivors" | Carolyn Whittaker | |
2024; 13th Canadian Screen Awards
| 2024; 13th Canadian Screen Awards | An Optimist's Guide to the Planet | Nikolaj Coster-Waldau, Philip Clarke, Jennifer Baichwal, Nicholas de Pencier, David W. Brady, Kate Harrison Karman, Joe Derrick, Patrick Cameron | |
| 2024; 13th Canadian Screen Awards | All Too Clear: Beneath the Surface of the Great Lakes | Yvonne Drebert | |
| 2024; 13th Canadian Screen Awards | The Nature of Things: "Jawsome: Canada's Great White Sharks" | Sonya Lee, Chelsea Turner, Jeff Turner | |
| 2024; 13th Canadian Screen Awards | The Nature of Things: "Love Hurts: The Science of Heartbreak" | Nabil Mehchi, Frank Fiorito | |
| 2024; 13th Canadian Screen Awards | The Nature of Things: "Plastic People: The Hidden Crisis of Microplastics" | Peter Raymont, Stephen Paniccia, Vanessa Dylyn, Rick Smith, Steve Ord | |
2025; 14th Canadian Screen Awards
| 2025; 14th Canadian Screen Awards | The Birdman of Cooper Island | Kevin McMahon, Michael McMahon | |
| 2025; 14th Canadian Screen Awards | The Good Virus | Rosie Dransfeld, Vanessa Dylyn | |
| 2025; 14th Canadian Screen Awards | Hunt for the Oldest DNA | Niobe Thompson | |
| 2025; 14th Canadian Screen Awards | Incandescence | Shirley Vercruysse | |
| 2025; 14th Canadian Screen Awards | The Nature of Things: "Animal Pride" | Carolyn Whittaker | |
