= Gowling WLG =

Law firm

- No. of offices: +20
- No. of lawyers: +1,500
- Key people: Chris Towle (CEO, UK); Steve McKersie (CEO, Canada)
- Date founded: 2016
- Company type: Company limited by guarantee; separate limited liability partnerships in Canada and the United Kingdom
- Website: www.gowlingwlg.com

Gowling WLG is a multinational business law firm with approximately 1500 lawyers working across eight countries. As of 2025, it is the largest law firm in Canada, the 15th largest in the UK, and the 88th largest in the world by revenue.

== Overview ==
Gowling WLG was formed in 2016 through the combination of Canada-based Gowlings and UK-based Wragge Lawrence Graham & Co, whose predecessor firms date back to 1887 and 1834 respectively. The firm offers comprehensive legal services across key global sectors including life sciences, financial services, energy, infrastructure, government, technology, real estate, natural resources, and automotive.

Gowling WLG (UK) LLP acted as Official Legal Advisers and an Official Sponsor of the Birmingham 2022 Commonwealth Games, as well as Team England.

== Legal structure ==
Gowling WLG International Limited is an English company limited by guarantee comprising two limited liability partnerships: Gowling WLG (Canada) LLP and Gowling WLG (UK) LLP. Legal services are provided by the two partnerships, which are financially separate. The structure is similar to the Swiss Verein structure used by several other major international law firms.

== Offices ==
The firm has more than 20 offices across Canada, the UK, continental Europe, the Middle East, and China. The firm also maintained an office in Russia until the 2022 invasion of Ukraine, after which Gowling joined other businesses in departing the Russian market.

== Notable professionals and alumni ==
- Leonard Walter Brockington (1888–1966). Founding chairman of the CBC, 1936-1939; Rector of Queen's University, 1947–1966.
- Gordon F. Henderson (1912–1993). President of the Canadian Bar Association, 1979–1980; Chancellor of the University of Ottawa, 1991–1993.
- Roy McMurtry (1932–2024). Attorney General of Ontario, 1975–1985; High Commissioner of Canada to the UK, 1985–1988; Chief Justice of Ontario, 1996–2007.
- Ray Hnatyshyn (1934–2002). 24th Governor General of Canada, 1990–1995.
- Ian Scott (1934–2006). Attorney General of Ontario, 1985–1990.
- Donald Mazankowski (1935–2020). Deputy Prime Minister of Canada, 1986–1993.
- Martin Cauchon (b. 1962). Minister of Justice (Canada) and Attorney General of Canada, 2002–2003.
- Lawrence Cannon (b. 1947). Minister of Transport (Canada), 2006–2008; Minister of Foreign Affairs (Canada), 2006–2008.
- Frank Marrocco. Associate Chief Justice of the Ontario Superior Court of Justice, 2005–2020.
- Robert Ghiz (b. 1974) 31st Premier of Prince Edward Island, 2016.
- Malcolm Rowe (b. 1953) Judge of the Supreme Court of Canada, 1984-1996.
