= The Coldest Night of the Year =

1981 single by Bruce Cockburn

Single by Bruce Cockburn

from the album Resume
- B-side: "Joy Will Find a Way" (Canada) "Lord of the Starfields" (United States)
- Released: May 1981
- Recorded: March 1981
- Studio: Manta Sound, Toronto
- Length: 3:57
- Label: True North (Canada); Millennium Records (United States)
- Songwriter: Bruce Cockburn
- Producer: Gene Martynec

Bruce Cockburn singles chronology
"Fascist Architecture" (1981)	"The Coldest Night of the Year" (1981)	"You Pay Your Money and You Take Your Chance" (1982)

"The Coldest Night of the Year" is a song by the Canadian singer-songwriter Bruce Cockburn. It was recorded in March 1981 at Manta Sound and later included on the Resume and Mummy Dust compilations that same year. The song was also released as a single, where it was issued on the True North label in Canada and Millennium Records in the United States.

== Background ==
Cockburn wrote "The Coldest Night of the Year" around Christmas 1980 when Canada had experienced frigid temperatures. He then centered the song around loneliness by using the cold temperature as a metaphor for this sentiment. Cockburn debuted "The Coldest Night of the Year" during a January 1981 live performance in Toronto. Reviewing Cockburn's Toronto show, Wilder Penfield III wrote in The Toronto Sun that "The Coldest Night of the Year" received one of the warmest responses from the audience that evening.

In May 1981, "The Coldest Night of the Year" was included on Resume in the United States as the only new song. Discussing its inclusion, Cockburn said that he included "The Coldest Night of the Year" on Resume so that the compilation would not exclusively be a retrospective collection of old material, explaining that "the vision is not simply into the past, for I have also included a brand new tune, 'The Coldest Night Of The Year', as we all look forward to Spring's thaw." In Cashbox, "The Coldest Night of the Year" was advertised as a "brand new hot smash" from Cockburn.

That same year, "The Coldest Night of the Year" appeared on the Canadian-exclusive Mummy Dust, where it was one of four previously unreleased tracks. Between Resume and Mummy Dust, "The Coldest Night of the Year" was one of three songs to appear on both compilations, with the others being "Silver Wheels" and "Laughter".

== Release ==
"The Coldest Night of the Year" was released as a single in both the United States and Canada, where it peaked at No. 42 in the latter country. Its chart run in Canada coincided with a seven-week pause in the publication of RPM. "The Coldest Night of the Year" peaked at No. 42 in issue 4 of the magazine, which was dated July 4, 1981; In doing so, it rose two spots from it debut on the chart the week prior. During this time, the Canadian Union of Postal Workers had gone on a 42-day strike to secure more parental leave, with The Record being the only Canadian music industry trade magazine that was publishing during certain portions of the strike.

When the seven-week pause ended on August 29, 1981 with issue 5 of RPM, "The Coldest Night of the Year" was listed at No. 47 on the RPM 50 Singles chart. The following year, "The Coldest Night of the Year" received a PRO Canada award in the pop category, an award given out to the most frequently played pieces of music licensed in Canada by the organization.

== Critical reception ==
Discussing a January 1981 live performance of "The Coldest Night of the Year", Paul McGrath of The Globe and Mail called it a "sensitive update of an old rhythm and blues idea, successful as more than imitation because of Cockburn's formidable melodic talent." Writing for The Gazette, Jon Griffin referred to the studio recording of "The Coldest Night of the Year" as "an unpretentious song with a simple, beautiful melody and lyrics that speak eloquently of the emotional side-effects of Canadian winters." Ted Shaw of Windsor Star said that "The Coldest Night of the Year" was "easily Cockburn's most commercial song in years".

Cashbox believed that "The Coldest Night of the Year" was "less introspective than Cockburn’s usual folk-tinged fare." Record World wrote that the "shining keyboard and sax colors spice the easy pace and Bruce's staid vocal" and thought that melody was palatable for both contemporary hit radio and the adult contemporary format. Billboard labeled "The Coldest Night of the Year" as one of the best songs on Cockburn's Resume album.

== Personnel ==
- Bruce Cockburn – guitar, vocals
- Dennis Pendrith – bass
- Jon Goldsmith – keyboards
- John T. Davis – organ
- Bob DiSalle – drums
- Hugh Marsh – violin
- Kathy Moses – saxophone, backing vocals

== Chart performance ==
Chart (1981)	Peak position
Canada Top Singles (RPM)	42
