= The Birdman of Cooper Island =

- Directed by: Kevin McMahon
- Produced by: Kevin McMahon; Michael McMahon
- Starring: George Divoky
- Cinematography: Chris Romeike
- Edited by: Nathan Shields
- Music by: Ohad Benchetrit; Justin Small
- Production company: Primitive Entertainment
- Distributed by: TVOntario
- Release date: October 16, 2024 (Planet in Focus)
- Running time: 90 minutes
- Country: Canada
- Language: English

The Birdman of Cooper Island is a Canadian documentary film, directed by Kevin McMahon and released in 2024. The film profiles George Divoky, a scientist who has spent over 50 years conducting field research into black guillemots on the Cooper Islands of Alaska.

The film premiered in October 2024 at the Planet in Focus film festival, before receiving a television broadcast on TVO in December 2024.

The film won the Rob Stewart Award for best science and nature documentary at the 14th Canadian Screen Awards in 2026.
