= Joan Parkins =

Canadian figure skater (1922–2013)

- Born: October 4, 1922; Ottawa, Ontario
- Died: June 1, 2013 (aged 90); Ottawa, Ontario
- Spouse: Gordon F. Henderson
- Children: Joanne,Gordon, Robert

Joan Parkins (October 4, 1922 – June 1, 2013) was a Canadian figure skater, philanthropist, and board executive.

== Biography ==
=== Skating career ===
Parkins went into figure skating at an early age. She had a high school education but did not further her education because figure skating would be her career. She began skating at the Minto Skating Club and won prizes at events such as the Winnipeg Speed Skating Association championships While at the Minto club, she was coached by Otto Gold.

In 1937, Parkins and Peter Chance won the Soper Cup for mixed pairs at the Minto Club Junior Championships. In 1938, Parkins had three first places at the Minto Junior Championships. She placed first for the Reynolds prize, while Barbara Ann Scott came in second. Parkins also came first in for the Potsdam Shield while Scott had another second. She and Peter Chance won the Soper cup again that year.

In 1939, at the Minto Skating Club Championships, she placed second in the junior ladies championship behind Barbara Scott. She and Chance won the mixed pairs competition, and Parkins won the 10 step competition with Pierre Leduc. She and Leduc competed in the 10 step competition at the Canadian National Skating Championships in 1940.

In 1940, Parkins won the Minto Skate club Girls junior Championships for singles. Princess Alice presented Parkins with the Minto cup. As Junior Champion of the club, she was awarded the gold medal of the Canadian Figure Skating Association.

=== Later life ===
Parkins had a request to turn professional, and while she was considering it, she began working on the switchboard at Gowlings in 1941. Her father died during that time, and in 1942, she married a young lawyer from the firm: Gordon Henderson. She subsequently did not go professional in figure skating and did not take a job.

In 1974, she and Joyce Loeb (wife of David Loeb) founded Capital Convention Services.

She was on the board of various organizations, including Skate Canada, Selkirk Communications, and the Stratford Festival. In 1989, she was appointed chairman of the board of the Ottawa Civic Hospital foundation.

She and her husband set up the Gordon and Joan Henderson Endowment Fund at the Ottawa Hospital and The Gordon and Joan Henderson Family Fund at the Community Foundation of Ottawa.

She died on June 1, 2013, at the age of 90.

== Family ==
Parkins was the eldest of John and Jennie Parkins's four children. In 1942 she married Gordon Henderson and was married for 55 years until he died in 1993. They had three children: Joanne, Gordon, and Robert, and nine grandchildren, including Stuart Henderson.
