= West (TV series) =

- Genre: Documentary
- Country of origin: Canada
- Original language: English
- No. of seasons: 1

Production
- Producers: John N. Smith; Cynthia Scott
- Running time: 30 minutes
- Production company: National Film Board of Canada

Original release
- Network: CBC Television
- Release: 19 December 1973 – 23 June 1974

West is a Canadian documentary television series that aired on CBC Television from 1973 to 1974.

== Premise ==
This series of National Film Board of Canada productions featured life on the Canadian prairie provinces (Alberta, Manitoba and Saskatchewan).

== Scheduling ==
This half-hour series was broadcast Wednesdays at 10:00 p.m. from 19 December 1973 to 17 April 1974. There were rebroadcasts from 23 June 1974, Sundays at 1:00 p.m.

== Episodes ==
- "Catskinner Keen" (Donald Brittain producer and director), featuring Bob Keen
- "Cavendish Country" (Donald Brittain producer and director), about Cal Cavendish, a country musician
- "Every Saturday Night" (John Taylor producer; Tom Radford director), concerning the Depression-era hoedown band the Badlanders
- "I Don't Have to Work that Big" (John N. Smith producer; Michael McKennirey director), featuring Joe Fafard's sculpting
- "The Jews of Winnipeg" (John N. Smith producer; Bill Davies director), a community profile with interviews of entertainer David Steinberg, singer Judy Lander and lawyer Joseph Zuken
- "The New Boys" (John N. Smith producer and director), featuring Saint John's Cathedral Boys' School in Selkirk, Manitoba
- "Ruth and Harriet: Two Women of the Peace" (Cynthia Scott producer; Barbara Greene director), set in the Peace River Country area of Alberta, profiling two of the homesteading women
- "Some Natives of Churchill" (Cynthia Scott producer and director), concerning life in Churchill, Manitoba
- "Starblanket" (Donald Brittain producer and director), a profile of First Nations reserve chief Noel Starblanket
- "This Riel Business" (Ian McLaren producer and director), featuring Regina's Globe Theatre production of Tales from a Prairie Drifter, a comedy play set in the North-West Rebellion and features Louis Riel as a character
- "Van's Camp" (Les Rose and Donald Brittain, producers and directors), set in a Lac la Ronge, Saskatchewan fishing camp
- "We're Here To Stay" (Ian McLaren producer and director), set in Lestock, Saskatchewan, featuring the efforts of farmers to run their Agri-Pool farm cooperative

== See also ==
- Adieu Alouette
- Pacificanada
