= Gordon F. Henderson =

Canadian lawyer (1912–1993)

Gordon Fripp Henderson CC, QC, LL.D. (Hon.)
- Henderson (1984) taken by Harry Palmer

Honorary Consul to Liberia in Canada

51st President of the Canadian Bar Association
- In office 1979–1980
- Preceded by: Thomas J. Walsh
- Succeeded by: A. William Cox

Chancellor of the University of Ottawa
- In office 1991–1993
- Preceded by: Maurice Sauvé
- Succeeded by: Huguette Labelle

Personal details
- Born: April 17, 1912 Ottawa, Ontario, Canada
- Died: August 17, 1993 (aged 81) Ottawa, Ontario, Canada
- Spouse: Joan Parkins (m. 1942-1993)
- Relations: Henderson family
- Children: Joanne, Gordon, Robert
- Parent(s): Gordon Smith Henderson; Charlotte Stratton
- Education: Lisgar Collegiate Institute, University of Toronto (BA) (1934); Osgoode Hall Law School (LL.B) (1937)
- Profession: Lawyer

Gordon Fripp Henderson, CC QC (April 17, 1912 – August 17, 1993) was a Canadian intellectual property lawyer who joined the law firm Gowling Lafleur Henderson LLP in 1937, and later became its chairman. He was known for his advocacy on intellectual property matters as well as his involvement in intellectual property organizations throughout his career. Henderson's contribution to the development of Canadian and international jurisprudence is described as one of the most significant in Canadian legal history.

He was heavily involved in the Intellectual Property Institute of Canada, and founded the Canadian Patent Reporter and Ottawa Cablevision. Henderson was the president of the Canadian Bar Association, the chancellor of the University of Ottawa, a co-owner of the Ottawa Rough Riders and several hockey teams, and was instrumental in the foundation of SOCAN as its lawyer and later as chairman. He was a philanthropist and civic leader in Ottawa having lent his support to many causes. For his decades of service he received the 1988 B'nai B'rith Award of Merit and a Companionship within the Order of Canada.

== Personal life and education ==
Henderson was born in Ottawa, Ontario, on April 17, 1912. His father was a well known defense lawyer in Ottawa, Gordon Smith Henderson, and his mother was Charlotte Stratton. Henderson was an only child and grew up in fairly affluent surroundings. His grandfather, William Henderson, came from Scotland, and eventually moved to Victoria to become a provincial Government architect. His uncle, Stuart Alexander Henderson, was described as the best criminal lawyer of his time in the country. He received a Bachelor of Arts degree from the University of Toronto in 1934 and graduated from Osgoode Hall Law School in 1937. In 1942 he married Joan Parkins, and they had three children together: Joanne, Gordon, and Robert. Henderson died on August 17, 1993, in Ottawa.

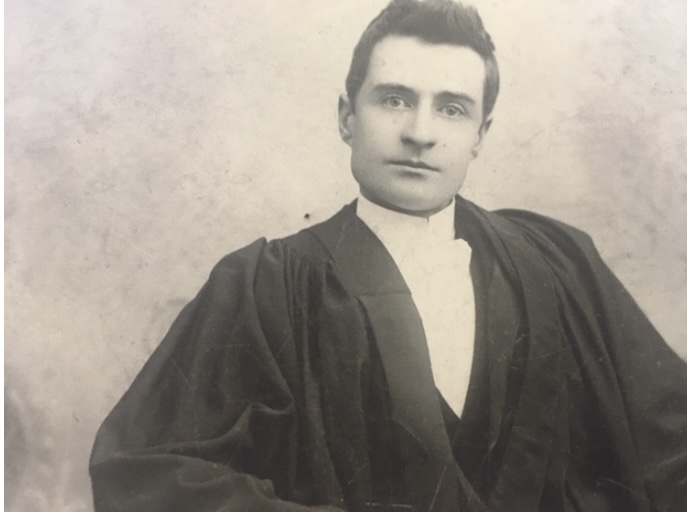
Henderson's father Gordon Smith Henderson

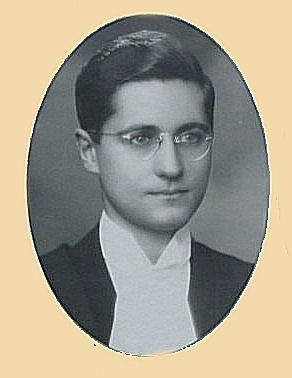
Henderson's Osgoode yearbook photo (1937)

== Career ==
=== Advocacy ===
Upon his call to the bar in 1937, Henderson joined the firm of Henderson & Herridge (which later became Gowling Lafleur Henderson). Within 3 years, and before the age of 28, Henderson had appeared successfully on two separate occasions at the Supreme Court of Canada. Throughout his career, Henderson developed a reputation for litigation in all areas of law, especially in intellectual property. Former Ontario Superior Court Justice Roydon Kealey referred to Henderson as "one of three top lawyers in Canada. He was a legend, a prodigious worker, and more or less a genius." Ian Scott, former Attorney General of Ontario, called him "the best all-round lawyer the profession has produced since the War." He was known as a "lawyer's lawyer" by the Ottawa community, and by his colleagues as "a gentlemen, a character, and Canada's most respected lawyer". By the time of his death, Henderson appeared as counsel in nearly 400 reported cases, including 90 before the Supreme Court of Canada. Henderson never retired.

In the 1940s he was the first to have home movies screened as evidence in a Canadian court. Later, in the same decade, Henderson convinced a judge to permit a tape recording into evidence, which was another first.

Henderson was twice offered a judgeship. On the first occasion, early in his career, he was asked to be in on the trial division of the Ontario High Court. He rejected the offer because he thought at his age he would not be effective on the bench. The second offer came in 1972 from John Turner who asked Henderson to accept an appointment to the Ontario court of appeal. He initially accepted but eventually decided against it.

=== Professional associations ===
Henderson was also an active participant in professional associations both within and outside the legal community. He was heavily involved in the Intellectual Property Institute of Canada. Henderson was the president of the Patent Institute of Canada and was the president of the Canadian Bar Association from 1979 to 1980. He founded the Canadian Bar Foundation during his presidency. He was also involved with the International Bar Association as a member of the council of the business law section. Henderson helped found the Canadian Law Information Council and served as it chairman.

He was also the founding editor of the Canadian Patent Reporter (CPR) (which he started in 1941). The CPR was one of the first continuous case reporters for Canadian intellectual property law decisions, and remains a leading reporter today. For most of its existence, Henderson wrote virtually every headnote and comment in the publication.

Henderson was made president of the Kiwanis Club of Ottawa in 1952 and was heavily involved in the organization throughout his life.

Henderson was a part time lecturer at the University of Ottawa. In his later years, Henderson served on the Board of Governors of the University of Ottawa, and from 1991 until his death in 1993, he was Chancellor of the university.

He was the first honorary chairperson for REACH Canada (1981), an organization that assists people with disabilities in getting legal help.

Henderson was the founding chairman of the University of Ottawa Heart Institute Advisory board. In 1982 Henderson chaired the Ottawa Civic Hospital Frank Sinatra/Rich Little Gala dinner which raised 750,000 dollars for charity.

Henderson was Honorary Consul to Liberia in Canada, a position that brought diplomatic privileges.

=== Cable and radio ===
Henderson went into the cable business just as it was starting and was very successful. He Co-Founded Ottawa Cablevision In 1965 and served as president and chairman. Ottawa Cablevision served the cable needs of the western half of Ottawa. He was elected president of CKOY limited, now CIWW (CityNews Ottawa), and was a part owner in CKOY as well as in Ottawa Cablevision. In 1980, Henderson joined the board of directors at Selkirk Communications. His cable and radio holdings were eventually sold to Maclean-Hunter (now Rogers).

=== Sports ===
Henderson was a part owner of the Ottawa Rough Riders from 1966 to 1969, during which the team won 2 Grey cup championships in 1968 and 1969. He and 11 other businessmen owned equal stakes of the team until in 1969, David Loeb bought them out for $750,000. He was also a trustee of the Schenley Awards. In 1987, the Roughriders were transferred to community ownership with a sale price of one dollar. Henderson again became a director and part owner of the club, buying one of 25 class B shares for $30,000.

In 1972 he became a director and part owner of the Ottawa Nationals of the World Hockey Association. Henderson successfully negotiated on behalf of the Nationals to obtain an arena space from the Central Canada Exhibition Association. Claude Bennett, who represented to CCEA, recommended Henderson to the Nationals because he had already negotiated a lease for the Rough Riders with them.

In 1966, Henderson, along with Sam Berger and others, bought the Ottawa Capitals of the Central Canada Hockey League.

Henderson was the lawyer for the Ottawa Civic's (of the WHA) and a director on the board. The team ultimately played only 7 games before folding.

=== Music Industry ===
Henderson congratulates Leonard Cohen as he receives an award

Henderson was instrumental in the formation of SOCAN, a major Canadian copyright collective, as its lawyer and later as chairman. Henderson led the negotiations for BMI Canada to become a fully independent Canadian organization (PROCAN). All of the BMI Canada shares were acquired and split between The Royal Trust, William Harold Moon, and Henderson. Henderson was in charge of the Performing Rights Organization of Canada (PROCAN) and the Music Promotion Foundation, which merged with the Composers, Authors, and Publishers Association of Canada (CAPAC) to create SOCAN in 1990. Edward M. Cramer credits the initiative for the merger to himself and Gordon Henderson. Today SOCAN represents over 185,000 people in the music industry.

The Gordon F. Henderson/SOCAN Copyright Competition was named in his honour in 1990 and annually has offered a prize of $2000 to a Canadian law student, or lawyer in their first year of articling, for an essay on the subject of copyright relating to music

At the time of his death, Henderson was a member of the Senate of the Stratford Festival. He was the founding chairman of the board of the Ottawa Congress Centre.

=== Notable Court Cases ===
Tennessee Eastman Co v. Canada (Commissioner of Patents): Henderson represented the appellant (Tennessee Eastman Co).

Capital City V. CRTC: Henderson acted on behalf of the appellants (Capital City). The court held that the content on both cable and broadcast television was within the jurisdiction of the Federal Government (1978).

Operation Dismantle v. R: Henderson represented the appellant (Operation Dismantle).

International Woodworkers of America, Local 2-69 v. Consolidated-Bathurst Packaging Ltd: Henderson acted on behalf of the respondent (Ontario Labour Relations Board) and won.

== Legacy ==
Henderson was a philanthropist, humanitarian and civic leader in his native Ottawa, having founded or lent his support to numerous causes. He was the founder of the Community Foundation of Ottawa and the Ottawa School Breakfasts Program. His decades of service to the University of Ottawa Heart Institute Foundation were recognized by the establishment of the Gordon F. Henderson Chair in Leadership to be held by the CEO of the institute. The University of Ottawa recognized Henderson's leadership through an endowment supporting the Gordon F. Henderson Chair in Human Rights.

Upon his death, Warren Kinsella called him "one of the most extraordinary people I have ever met." His memorial service in Ottawa was attended by nearly 1,300 people.

In September 2019, the county of Carleton Law Association (CCLA) announced that their library would bear the name of The Gordon F. Henderson Library. Alongside this, since 1992, the CCLA has given out The Gordon F. Henderson award to legal community members who have made a significant contribution to the community through charitable services. Past winners include Lawrence Greenspon and Warren Creates. The Gordon Henderson postdoctoral fellowship was established at the University of Ottawa in his name. The fellowship is offered to a researcher with an innovative and promising research project which aligns with the mandate of the Human Rights Research and Education Centre (HRREC) at the University of Ottawa.

Henderson was featured in David Ricardo Williams book Just Lawyers Seven Portraits. He was also in the book Learned Friends A Tribute to Fifty Remarkable Ontario Advocates, 1950–2000.

== Honours and awards ==
Ribbon bar	Description	Notes
	Queen's Counsel (QC)	Awarded in 1953
	Officer of the Order of Canada (OC)	Awarded on July 11, 1977. Invested on September 25, 1977. For his numerous contributions to the legal profession in Canada and to community organizations in Ottawa.
	Queen Elizabeth II Silver Jubilee Medal	Awarded in 1977 as an officer of the Order of Canada
	Canadian Bar Foundation testimonial dinner	Held in 1982 and televised in Ottawa
	Life bencher of the Law Society of Ontario	From 1983 until his death in 1993
	The Royal Ottawa Hospital Humanitarian Award	Awarded in 1984 at the Hospital's annual foundation dinner.
	Companion of the Order of Canada (CC)	Awarded on July 11, 1988. Invested on November 08, 1988. This is a promotion within the Order
	B'nai B'rith Award of Merit	Awarded in 1988 at a televised dinner in honour of Henderson.
	County of Carleton Law Association medal	Awarded in 1990
	125th Anniversary of the Confederation of Canada Medal	Awarded in 1992 as a companion of the Order of Canada
	Outstanding Philanthropic Individual in Ottawa	Awarded posthumously in 1996.

=== Honorary doctorates ===
Location	Year	School	Degree
Ontario	1979	University of Ottawa	Doctor of Laws (L.L.D.)
Ontario	1979	University of Ottawa	Doctor of the University (DUniv)
Ontario	1982	Law Society of Ontario	Doctor of Laws (L.L.D.)
Ontario	1984	Carleton University	Doctor of Laws (L.L.D.)

=== Honorific eponyms ===
- (Canada) Gordon F. Henderson Award (CCLA)
- (Canada) Gordon F. Henderson/SOCAN Copyright Award
- (Canada) The Gordon F. Henderson Award for the Best Factum Writers (Harold G. Fox Moot)
- (Ontario) Gordon F. Henderson Postdoctoral Fellowship
- (Ontario) Gordon F. Henderson Chair in Human Rights
- (Ontario) Ottawa Heart Institute Gordon F. Henderson Chair in Leadership
- (Ontario) Gordon F. Henderson Law Library

== Bibliography ==
Williams, David Ricardo (1995). Just Lawyers: Seven Portraits. Osgoode Society for Canadian Legal History. ISBN 978-0-8020-0747-6.

Academic offices
Preceded by Maurice Sauvé	Chancellor of the University of Ottawa; 1991–1993	Succeeded by Huguette Labelle
