= Pacificanada =

- Genre: Documentary
- Country of origin: Canada
- Original language: English
- No. of seasons: 1
- No. of episodes: 8

Production
- Executive producers: Peter Jones (Vancouver); Ian McLaren (Montreal)
- Running time: 30 minutes
- Production company: National Film Board of Canada

Original release
- Network: CBC Television
- Release: 22 January – 12 March 1975

Related
- West

Pacificanada is a National Film Board of Canada (NFB) documentary television miniseries about British Columbia that aired on CBC Television in 1975.

== Premise ==
Pacificanada was the NFB's third documentary television series on the regions of Canada, following Adieu Alouette on Quebec, then West, about the Canadian Prairies.

Originally, the NFB wanted to make a combined series on B.C. and the Maritimes, to be called Coastal Peoples, but instead, the west and east coasts were explored individually, with the Maritimes the focus of a future series, Atlanticanada.

== Production ==
As with its previous regionally focused series, the NFB sought to give exposure to local filmmakers in Pacificanada, with 5 of the 8 episodes directed by B.C. filmmakers. Ian McLaren, who had produced the Adieu Alouette series and directed one of the West films, was executive producer on Pacificanada.

== Scheduling ==
Eight half-hour episodes of Pacificanada were broadcast. The series aired Wednesdays at 10:30 p.m. from 22 January to 12 March 1975. It was rebroadcast Sundays at 1:00 p.m. from 6 July to 17 August 1975.

== International sales ==
Certain Pacificanada films were sold internationally. Soccer was sold to KCTS, Seattle's PBS station, as well as broadcasters in Israel, Scotland, Nigeria and South Africa. The Oscar nomination for Whistling Smith led to sales to networks in Iran and the UK. KCTS Seattle also bought the film, with excerpts from it also bought by CBS news for use in 60 Minutes.

== Episodes ==
1. 22 January 1975: "A Slow Hello" (Ian McLaren and John Taylor producers; Tom Radford director), featuring present-day cowboys and cattle ranching
2. 29 January 1975: "Whistling Smith" (Ian McLaren, Michael Scott, Barrie Howells producers; Marrin Cannell and Scott directors), featuring a Vancouver police officer patrolling Gastown amid that area's social challenges. The film was nominated for an Academy Award.
3. 5 February 1975: "Soccer" (Peter Jones producer; Shelah Reljic director), about association football in the province
4. 12 February 1975: "Where Are You Goin' Company Town?" (Ian McLaren producer; Stephen Dewar director), set in Trail, British Columbia, concerning the relationship between management and employees at the dominant employer Cominco. The episode was criticized by the mayor of Trail and region's Member of Parliament, who claimed that the NFB staged a confrontation between workers and management on a picket line and distorted the truth about Trail. NFB commissioner Sydney Newman had to personally write to the MP to explain that the NFB had been filming for several days on the picket line when the trouble broke out and that the crew just filmed what was going on without influencing the outcome. Audiences and critics were divided, with some claiming it was biased, others, well-made. There were also complaints from viewers about crude language.
5. 19 February 1975: "Pen-Hi Grad" (Ian McLaren producer; Sandy Wilson director), about a secondary school graduation ceremony in Penticton
6. 26 February 1975: "David and Bert" (Peter Jones producer; Daryl Duke director), featuring the friendship between David Frank and Bert Clayton, the former a First Nations chief and the latter a prospector
7. 5 March 1975: "Baby This Is For You" (Barrie Howells producer; John Taylor director), set in Stewart, British Columbia, a community close to the Alaska border
8. 12 March 1975: "Bella Bella" (John N. Smith producer; Barbara Greene director), concerning efforts to preserve the culture of the Heiltsuk people on Campbell Island while seeking economic development
