= Warren Creates =

- Born: Montreal, Quebec, Canada
- Education: University of Windsor (Juris Doctor), Western University (Undergraduate)
- Occupation: Immigration lawyer
- Years active: 34
- Website: http://www.warrencreates.com

Warren Leonard Creates is a Canadian immigration, refugee and citizenship lawyer based in Ottawa, Ontario, Canada. He was designated as a Certified Specialist in Immigration, in Citizenship and in Refugee Law by the Law Society of Ontario in 2006 and has maintained this designation every year since.

Born and raised in Montreal, Creates obtained his Juris Doctor degree from the University of Windsor and was admitted to the Ontario bar in 1986. He was previously a legal advisor to the Immigration and Refugee Board of Canada, and is head of the Immigration Law Group at Perley-Robertson, Hill & McDougall LLP/s.r.l.

Creates has been cited by Canadian media as a commentator on Canadian and international immigration issues.

In early 2020, Creates was successful at the Federal Court level in gaining judicial review of a visa officer's decision in Rezaei v. Canada (Immigration, Refugees and Citizenship), making this the leading case on self-employed business immigration applications for permanent resident status.

== Awards and recognitions ==
Creates has received recognition from Best Lawyers yearly since 2012 for his work in immigration and refugee law.

In 2011, Creates was profiled in the Canadian Bar Association's publication, the National] magazine.

In 2013, Creates was awarded the Queen Elizabeth II Diamond Jubilee Medal and the County of Carleton Law Association's Gordon F. Henderson Award for his charitable services on behalf of the community.

In 2016, Creates was the recipient of the St. Joe's Women's Centre's Annual Quality of Life Award.

== Philanthropy and community work ==
Creates is one of the original founders of the Ottawa Dragon Boat Festival, North America's largest dragon boat festival, first held in 1993. In 1998, he introduced the Festival's charitable component. He continues to serve on the Festival's Executive Committee.

In 2008, Creates helped found the Can-Go Afar Foundation, a charitable organization dedicated to helping the Afar, one of the planet's oldest aboriginal cultures. He continues to act as President of the Foundation and legal counsel (pro bono) to the Afar people.
