= Michael J. F. Scott =

Canadian film and television producer and director

Michael Scott, sometimes credited as Michael J. F. Scott, is a Canadian film and television director and producer.

Associated in his early career with the National Film Board of Canada, he is a five time Genie Award winner as producer of the short films Ted Baryluk's Grocery, The Big Snit, Get a Job, Village of Idiots and Runaway, a two-time Academy Award nominee for his work on The Big Snit and Whistling Smith, and a two-time Gemini Award nominee for the television films Ikwé and Lost in the Barrens.
