= The Water Brothers =

Canadian television series

The Water Brothers is a Canadian documentary television series, which premiered in 2012 on TVOntario. Hosted by Tyler and Alex Mifflin, the series centers on the human relationship with water, focusing in particular on the need to conserve and protect it as an essential resource.

The series originally aired for four seasons between 2012 and 2017, with the 2017 episodes announced as its final season at that time, before returning with a new fifth season in 2023.

The series has been a three-time nominee for the Rob Stewart Award for best science or nature documentary at the Canadian Screen Awards, receiving nods at the 4th Canadian Screen Awards in 2016, the 6th Canadian Screen Awards in 2018, and the 12th Canadian Screen Awards in 2024. It won the award in 2024.
