= Ageless Gardens =

2018 Canadian television series

Ageless Gardens is a Canadian documentary television series, which premiered in 2018 on VisionTV. The series centres on gardening, focusing in particular on the spiritual and health benefits that can be derived from taking up and maintaining gardening as a pastime.

Amanda Cawley received a Canadian Screen Award nomination for Best Original Music, Non-Fiction at the 10th Canadian Screen Awards, and a Canadian Screen Music Award nomination for Best Original Score for a Non-Fiction Series or Limited Series, in 2022. The series was a nominee for the Rob Stewart Award for best science or nature documentary at the 12th Canadian Screen Awards in 2024.
