= Whistling Smith =

1975 film

- Directed by: Marrin Canell; Michael J. F. Scott
- Written by: Donald Brittain
- Produced by: Barrie Howells; Michael J. F. Scott; Ian McLaren (exec.)
- Starring: Bernie Smith
- Narrated by: Donald Brittain
- Cinematography: Henri Fiks
- Edited by: Marrin Canell; Michael J. F. Scott; John Knight (sound)
- Music by: Larry Crosley
- Production company: National Film Board of Canada
- Distributed by: National Film Board of Canada
- Release date: 1975
- Running time: 27 minutes
- Country: Canada
- Language: English

Whistling Smith is a 1975 Canadian short documentary film directed by Marrin Canell and Michael J. F. Scott for the National Film Board of Canada. It was written by Donald Brittain and produced for the NFB's Pacificanada series, which aired on CBC-TV in early 1975.

== Synopsis ==
The film is a revealing portrait of a tough cop with a big heart. Vancouver Police Department Sergeant Bernie "Whistling" Smith walks the beat on the city's Downtown Eastside, the hang-out of petty criminals and down-and-outers. His policing style is unorthodox; to many drug users and prostitutes, he's more than a cop – he's a counsellor and a friend. In the year that he's been in charge of this beat, crime has dropped by over forty per cent.

== Accolades ==
Whistling Smith was nominated for an Academy Award for Best Documentary Short at the 48th Academy Awards. It also won the Canadian Film Award for Sound Re-Recording.
