= Crowle, Worcestershire =

Village in Worcestershire, England

Coordinates: 52.202767°N 2.11401°W

Crowle
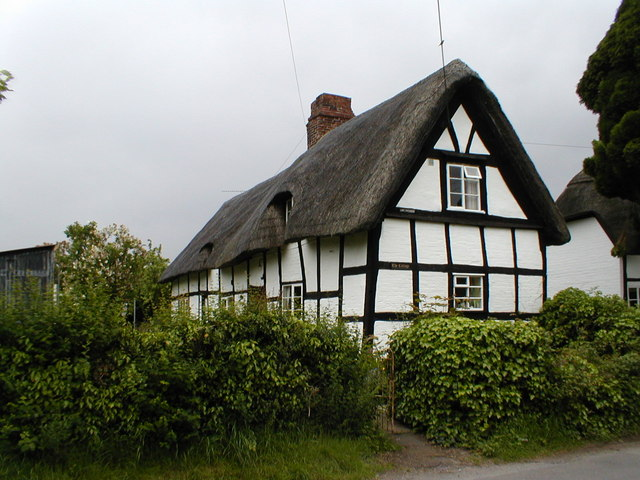

- Location within Worcestershire
- Population: 1,000 (approx)
- Shire county: Worcestershire
- Region: West Midlands
- Country: England
- Sovereign state: United Kingdom
- Post town: Worcester
- Postcode district: WR7
- Dialling code: 01905

Crowle (rhymes with coal) is a village in Worcestershire, England situated 4 miles (6.4 km) east of Worcester.

The name Crowle derives from the Old English crohlēah meaning 'wood/clearing at the corner', or 'saffron wood/clearing'.

Crowle is known for its Church of England St John the Baptist Church.

The village has a primary school named Crowle CofE Primary School (formerly Crowle CofE First School). The Preschool houses the village's war memorial, listing the names of the 96 men from Crowle who served during the First World War. Opposite sits an enclave of houses whose streets bear the names of those fallen.

The village pub is The Chequers at Crowle.

== Notable people ==
- John Crabtree DL, OBE, businessman and former lawyer, lives in the village
