= Wragge & Co =

British law firm

Wragge & Co LLP
- Headquarters: Birmingham, UK
- No. of offices: 8
- No. of lawyers: 572
- No. of employees: 1,021
- Major practice areas: General practice
- Key people: UK Managing Partner: Ian Metcalfe; UK Senior Partner: Quentin Poole
- Revenue: £120.5 million (2012–13)
- Date founded: 1834
- Founders: George Paulson Wragge; Clement Ingleby
- Company type: Limited liability partnership
- Dissolved: 2014 (merged with Lawrence Graham to form Wragge Lawrence Graham & Co); 2016 (WLG merged with Gowlings to form Gowling WLG)
- Website: wragge.com

Wragge & Co LLP was a UK-headquartered international law firm providing a full range of legal services to UK and international clients. Wragge & Co merged with the London law firm Lawrence Graham in May 2014, forming Wragge Lawrence Graham & Co. In 2016, Wragge Lawrence Graham & Co merged with the Canadian law firm Gowlings to become Gowling WLG.

According to The Lawyer 200 in 2011, Wragge & Co was the 23rd-largest law firm in the UK. Twenty of its partners featured among the 'leading individuals' of the Legal 500, while the firm was ranked for 41 different practice areas in Chambers UK 2012. Its 126 equity partners and 500 lawyers advised on deals, projects and disputes from the firm's headquarters in Birmingham and offices in London, Brussels, Guangzhou and Munich. Wragge & Co also had affiliated offices in Abu Dhabi, Dubai and Paris.

== History ==
The original Wragge & Co partnership was formed by George Paulson Wragge and Clement Ingleby in 1834. They set up offices at No. 4 Bennett's Hill, which remained there for 130 years. Following the First World War, Wragge & Co experienced exceptional growth and was considered to be the largest law firm in Birmingham at the time. The partnership merged with Gem & Co in 1935, followed by a merger with Crockford & Son in 1942. The firm was considered to be at the forefront of technology, being one of the first telephone subscribers in Birmingham.

Some of the firm's earliest clients included Lloyds Banking Co, The Birmingham Canal Navigations, and the Bishop of Worcester.

The senior partner from 1982 to 1993 was Sir John Patrick Grosvenor Lawrence. He had joined in 1959 and was knighted in 1987. Sir Patrick handed over to John Crabtree, who held the post for ten years. Between 1991 and 2002, Crabtree's leadership increased the firm's turnover by 650%, from £12 million in 1991 to £77.8 million in April 2002.

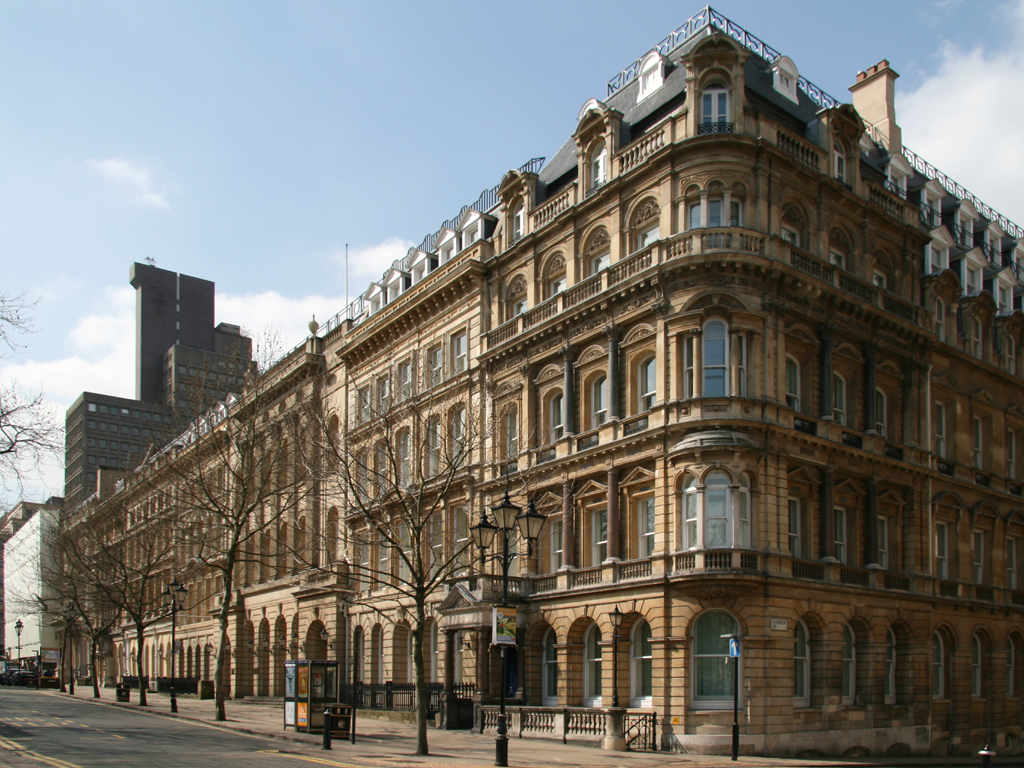
Wragge & Co's headquarters were located in Colmore Row, Birmingham

In recent years, to help its strategy of increasing revenue through international work, the firm experienced global expansion, with offices opening in London, Brussels, Guangzhou and Munich. As a result of a deal with the company's Saudi financier, Mohamed Al Mehairi, a new venture in Abu Dhabi was launched in December 2010, with a second office opening in Dubai the following year. Wragge & Co also joined forces with a 10-partner team to open a third affiliated office in Paris.

In 2008, Wragge & Co signed up to take 250,000 sq ft of offices at Two Snowhill, the largest office pre-let in Birmingham. The newly merged Wragge Lawrence Graham & Co relocated its Birmingham office to the brand new development in summer 2014.

On 11 December 2013, Wragge & Co announced a merger deal with London firm Lawrence Graham to create a new law firm – Wragge Lawrence Graham & Co – effective from 1 May 2014.

== Main areas of practice ==
Wragge & Co specialised in the following legal disciplines:

- Antitrust
- Commercial
- Construction and Engineering
- Corporate
- Dispute resolution
- Employment
- Finance
- Information technology
- Intellectual property
- Insurance
- Pensions
- Projects
- Public law
- Real estate
- Tax

== Awards ==
- Winner of the Big Tick for Work Inclusion – Business in the Community's Awards for Excellence 2011, 2012 and 2013
- 'Best Pro bono Partnership' at the LawWorks Awards 2012
- One of the Best Workplaces in the UK for 13 consecutive years, Great Place to Work Institute
- 'Best student marketing campaign' in the TARGETjobs National Graduate Recruitment Awards

== See also ==
- List of largest UK law firms
