= NABU Network =

Early home computer system

NABU Network Corporation
- Industry: Computer; Technology
- Founded: c. 1982; 44 years ago
- Defunct: c. 1985; 41 years ago
- Products: NABU Network
- Website: https://nabu.ca

The NABU Network (Natural Access to Bi-directional Utilities) was an early home computer system which was linked to a precursor of the World Wide Web, operating over cable TV. It operated from 1982 to 1985, primarily in Ottawa, Canada. Its functionality was then revolutionary, though it was not a commercial success. It has been called "The Internet — 10 years ahead of its time" (even though elements of the history of the internet predate it).

== Functionality ==
Families, schools, or individuals would purchase a NABU Personal Computer, which would be connected via cable TV to NABU's servers. In addition to normal PC capabilities of the time, the computer could download software and information content through the cable feed and could upload primitive information back up to the servers. Applications included games, the programming language Logo, news/current events, and rudimentary PC banking/shopping. At its peak, approximately 100 applications were available.

The NABU Network can be credited as being the first online version of fantasy baseball. The game, aptly named Managers Baseball, allowed for choosing teams based on the real names and statistics of MLB teams and players. Player performance in the game was based on real life player statistics and as a Manager you would draft your team and compete against another owner in a mock up game in a purely managerial role.

The NABU Personal Computer cost $950 CAD, approximately the same price as the wildly successful Commodore 64 at the time, and the network service cost $8 to $10 per month.

== Hardware ==
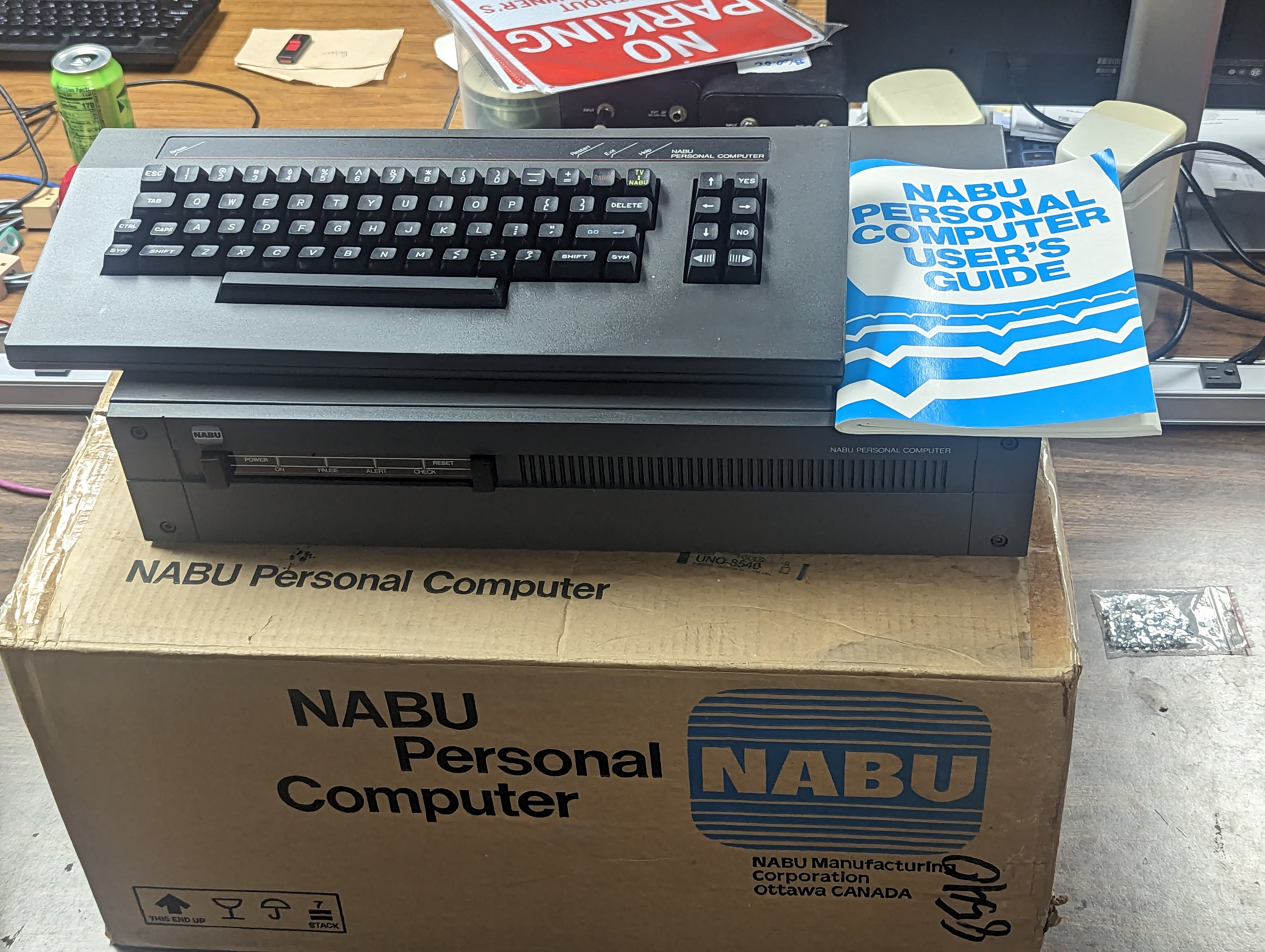
NABU Personal Computer (album)

NABU Personal Computer
- Developer: NABU Network Corporation
- Released: 1982
- CPU: Zilog Z80A @ 3.58 MHz
- Memory: 64 KB
- Storage: Optional hard drive
- Display: 256×192 graphics, 16 colours
- Graphics: Texas Instruments TMS9918A
- Sound: General Instrument AY-3-8910
- Connectivity: Serial port; Cable modem via network adapter
- Online services: Nabu Network

The heart of a NABU Personal Computer is a Z80A processor chip running at 3.58 MHz, 64 KB RAM, a Texas Instruments TMS9918A video chip with 16 KB RAM, a General Instrument AY-3-8910 sound chip, and a Western Digital TR1863 UART to connect to the interface module (below). Data was served via a Gould SEL minicomputer. By default, the PCs lacked any individual offline storage, but an optional hard drive could be purchased.

The interface module included four socketed chips: a TR1865CL-04 full-duplex UART, an SC87253P 8-bit microprocessor, an N8X60N FIFO I/O controller and a pre-programmed ROM. The remainder of the parts on the board were numerous 74LS series logic ICs. There was an RF module that down-converted signals from the cable connection and up-converted requests to be sent to the server. There were four circuit boards for frequency synthesis, data in and out and RF conversion and dual helical coil bandpass filters. Download speeds over the cable TV line were up to 6.4 Mbit/second.

== Business success ==
The NABU service first became available in 1983 through Ottawa Cablevision and Skyline Cablevision, through the efforts of John Kelly and Bruce Hempell. The project was heavily subsidized by the Canadian government. A major weakness of the Ottawa network was the strictly one-way connection as it was implemented on Ottawa Cablevision. The NABU system itself was bi-directional, but most cable networks of that era did not support this feature due to the cost required for a bidirectional cable infrastructure — a "chicken and egg" problem that limited NABU's market potential.

The fact that network access was limited to the NABU Personal Computer, forcing the subscriber to buy it, was mentioned as problematic by 1984, with the company accumulating $5 million losses. The same year Campeau Corporation, a major investor in NABU, pulled out.

Another network was started in Japan. However, NABU never achieved commercial success and ceased operation in 1985.

== 2009-present: Display at York University Computer Museum and modern-day rebirth ==
York University Computer Museum (YUCoM) and Center for the History of Canadian Microcomputing Industry provides a display and a virtual tour of this and other Canadian inventions. In 2009, the museum version was officially demonstrated, and in 2010, the development of a software emulator of the Nabu network began.

On November 26, 2022, Adrian Black, creator of the YouTube channel Adrian's Digital Basement, published a video showcasing a NABU PC however, it did not come with the adapter that was required for the computer to operate properly; and so he reached out to the community for help on getting his unit operational. Another YouTuber, DJ Sures, had published a video four days prior showcasing another NABU PC, and began working on how to program it. Sures, with the help of Leo Binkowski (one of the original NABU software programmers), has published a series of videos on things he has done to create an entire community of NABU users worldwide. The vast software library that DJ Sures had created included Cloud CP/M (the first internet-connected CP/M), Cloud GUI (CP/M File Manager), SlideShow, NABULIB (C Library), and dozens of CP/M utilities that enhanced the Cloud CP/M experience. DJ has a very detailed youtube series that documents the progress of his NABU hacking and software.

On December 5, 2022, NabuNetwork.com was launched as a NABU resource. The website includes a serial number tracker to see where all the NABU computers are around the world.

Emulation of the NABU is also possible through a core added to MAME by a GitHub user with the handle "brijohn". Marduk, a dedicated NABU emulator created by a GitHub user with the handle "buricco", is also available. A fork of Marduk was updated by GitHub user with the handle "visrealm". Jeremy Penner created a web version of Marduk.

== See also ==
- Teletext
- Minitel
