= Reaching =

Reaching may refer to:

- Reaching (sailing), when a boat is traveling approximately perpendicular to the wind
- Reaching (album), a 2002 album by LaRue
- Reaching (sculpture), a 1987 public artwork by Zenos Frudakis

== See also ==
- Reach (disambiguation)
