= John Crabtree (businessman) =

English lawyer and businessman (born 1949)

Sir John Crabtree CVO OBE DL
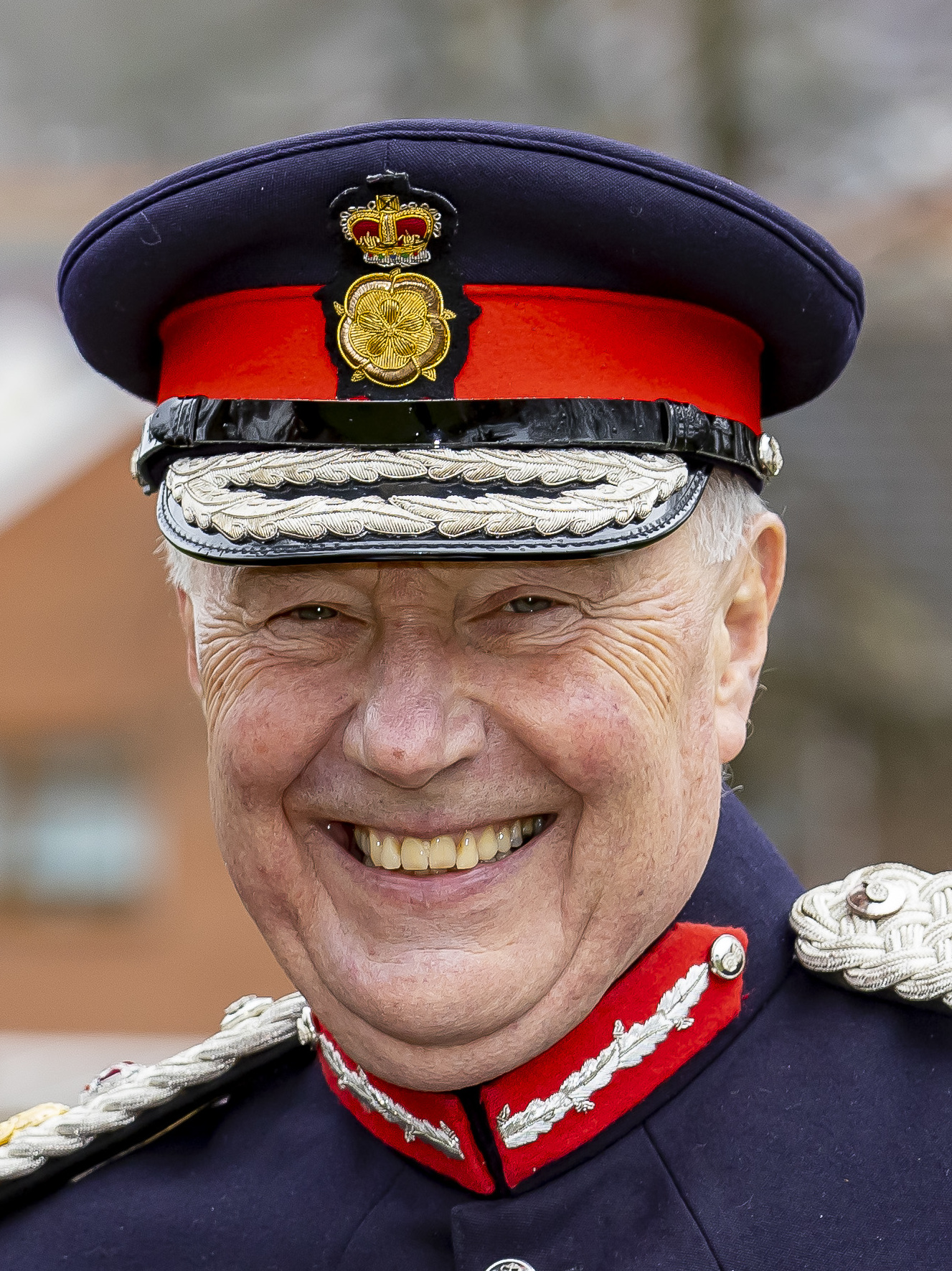
- John Crabtree in the uniform of a Lord Lieutenant
- Born: 5 August 1949
- Alma mater: The Downs Malvern; Radley College; University of Birmingham
- Occupation: Director, lawyer
- Employer: Wragge & Co (1973–2003)
- Awards: Officer of the Order of the British Empire (2007)
- Position held: High Sheriff of the West Midlands (2006–2007)

Sir John Rawcliffe Airey Crabtree, CVO, OBE, DL (born 5 August 1949) is an English lawyer and businessman, a former High Sheriff of the West Midlands and former Lord Lieutenant of the West Midlands. He is chair of the organising committee of the 2022 Commonwealth Games and holds or has held a number of business and charity directorships and chairs.

== Early life ==
Crabtree was born on 5 August 1949 to Norman Lloyd and Joyce Mary Crabtree, and was educated at The Downs School, Colwall, and Radley College. He graduated in law from the University of Birmingham in 1972.

== Career ==
Crabtree joined the Birmingham solicitors Wragge & Co in 1973, retiring as a senior partner in 2003.

He served as a Deputy Lieutenant of the West Midlands county in 2005, and as High Sheriff of the West Midlands in 2006/2007. He was President of Birmingham Chamber of Commerce and Industry and as a director of Advantage West Midlands. Since January 2017, has been the Lord Lieutenant of the West Midlands. As of 2022, he is a director of Birmingham Organising Committee for the 2022 Commonwealth Games Limited, and chairs the games' organising committee, a position to which he was appointed in 2018 by the then Prime Minister, Theresa May. He gave an address at the games' closing ceremony. He is scheduled to retire as Lord Lieutenant on 5 August 2024, with Derrick Anderson named as his successor.

He is a special adviser to White & Black, the corporate and technology law firm founded in 2007 by Phil Riman. He holds a number of business directorships, including chairmanship of Glenn Howells Architects. He is president of the Heart of England Community Foundation, and a past chairman (2008–2017) of the charity Sense, The National Deafblind and Rubella Association, and of Birmingham Hippodrome (2001–2017).

== Honours and awards ==
Crabtree was appointed an Officer of the Order of the British Empire (OBE) in the 2007 Birthday Honours for services to SENSE. He holds honorary doctorates from the University of Birmingham, Birmingham City University and Aston University. He was voted "Lawyer of the Year" in the 2003 Legal Business Awards. In 2012, he was given a lifetime achievement award in the Birmingham Post Business Awards. He was made a Knight Bachelor in the 2023 New Year Honours for services to sport and to the community in the West Midlands. In the 2024 King's Birthday Honours, he was appointed Commander of the Royal Victorian Order (CVO).

== Personal life ==
Crabtree and his wife, Diana, live in Crowle, Worcestershire. He is father to three daughters and three sons.
