= John Richard =

Canadian judge

John D. Richard OC QC (born July 30, 1934) was the Chief Justice of Canada's Federal Court of Appeal and in 2013, was listed as a NAFTA adjudicator.

Richard was born in Ottawa, Ontario, and received a Bachelor of Arts degree in political science from the University of Ottawa in 1955, followed by his law studies at Osgoode Hall Law School, where he received the gold medal and the Chancellor Van Koughnet Scholarship in 1959. He was called to the Bar of Ontario in that year, continuing his studies for an Honours Licentiate in Political & Social Sciences from Louvain University in 1960.

He then practised law as a trial lawyer at two firms throughout his legal career, from 1960 until 1994, when he was appointed as a judge. He was created Queen's Counsel in 1976. In 1994, he was appointed as a judge on the Federal Court of Canada's Trial Division, followed by his appointment as associate chief justice in 1998.

The court's name was changed to the Federal Court of Appeal, and he was appointed Chief Justice in 1999 by Prime Minister Jean Chrétien. Richard served until September 2009, when he retired.

Richard then became the Honorary Chairperson of Reach Canada, an NGO located in Ottawa that assists people with disabilities to get legal help.

Richard played three seasons of football for the Ottawa Gee-Gees, and in 2010 he was inducted into the Ottawa Gee-Gees football Hall of Fame.

In June 2012, Richard was named to the Order of Canada.
