= Lawrence Graham =

Law firm

Lawrence Graham LLP
- Headquarters: London, United Kingdom
- No. of offices: Five
- No. of lawyers: Approximately 188
- No. of employees: Approximately 440
- Major practice areas: General practice
- Key people: Andrew Witts (senior partner); Hugh Maule (managing partner)
- Revenue: £56 million (2011/12)
- Profit per equity partner: £303,000 (2011/12)
- Company type: Limited liability partnership

Lawrence Graham LLP (informally LG) was a multinational law firm headquartered in London, United Kingdom. The firm had over 180 lawyers, and as well as London it had offices in Dubai, Moscow, Singapore and Monaco. Lawrence Graham merged with the Birmingham-headquartered law firm Wragge & Co in May 2014, forming Wragge Lawrence Graham & Co.

== History ==
LG's history dated back almost 300 years. In 1730 the first law firms in the UK were registered; Coulthard Wildman and Graham was one of the first to form. In the 1760s James and Thomas Graham were the first 'Grahams' to join the firm. In 1854 Nathaniel Tertius Lawrence (President of the Law Society in 1879) was the first 'Lawrence' to join the firm. In 1977 the firm merged with Middleton Lewis. In 1990 the firm adopted the name 'Lawrence Graham'. In 1991 the firm merged with Blyth Dutton, increasing its size by 120 lawyers. In 1998 Forsyte Saunders Kerman's property department joined the firm, creating one of the largest private practice real estate groups in the UK. In the same year the firm acted for the Estate of Diana, Princess of Wales, following the Princess' death

In 2003 the firm opened an office in Monaco. In 2004 the firm merged with Tite & Lewis. In the same year the firm converted to a limited liability partnership. In 2006 the firm recruited the London Private Capital group of Simmons & Simmons. In 2007 the firm moved its headquarters and London office to More London and conducted a major rebranding exercise. In 2007 the firm opened an office in Dubai. In 2008 the firm recruited a senior litigation team from Dorsey & Whitney MNP. In 2009 the firm opened an office in Moscow.

In December 2013 it was announced that Lawrence Graham would merge with the Birmingham-headquartered law firm Wragge & Co. The merger was planned to be completed in May 2014, with the combined firm to be called Wragge Lawrence Graham & Co.
