= Tom Radford =

Canadian documentary filmmaker

Tom Radford CM (born March 12, 1946) is a Canadian documentary filmmaker from Edmonton, Alberta. A cofounder with Anne Wheeler and P. J. Reese of the Filmwest Associates studio, Radford is most noted for films on the history, culture and politics of Western Canada.

Born in Edmonton, Radford was the son of diarist Gertrude Hogg and the grandson of a former editor of the Edmonton Journal. He studied Canadian history at the University of Alberta, but left halfway through his master's program to begin working on his first documentary film, Ernest Brown: Pioneer Photographer. The film won the Golden Sheaf Award for Best of Festival at the Yorkton Film Festival in 1973; in 1975, he won both Best of Festival and Best Director at Yorkton for The Man Who Chooses the Bush.

In 1980 Radford left Filmwest to launch the Northwest Studio of the National Film Board of Canada, serving as executive producer of the division until 1985. He was subsequently a founding partner in the National Screen Institute, and in the commercial firms Film Frontiers, Great North Productions and Clearwater Media.

His other films have included Land (1971), Death of a Delta (1972), Every Saturday Night (1973), The Forests and Vladimir Krajina (1978), Life After Hockey (1989), The Buffalo Ground (1995), Tickling the Dragon's Tail (1999), The Honour of the Crown (2000), Arctic Dreamer: The Lonely Quest of Vilhjalmur Stefansson (2003), Tar Sands: The Selling of Alberta (2008) and Lost Years: A People's Struggle for Justice (2011), as well as episodes of the television documentary series West, Pacificanada, The Nature of Things and A Scattering of Seeds.

He won the Gemini Award for Best Science and Nature Documentary at the 26th Gemini Awards in 2011 for "Code Breakers", a Nature of Things episode he produced in collaboration with director Niobe Thompson; he also previously won Gemini Awards in 1988 for Foster Child and in 2004 for Arctic Dreamers, and received nominations for Tipping Point: The Age of the Oil Sands and The Perfect Runner.

He was inducted as a member of the Order of Canada in 2020.
