= Ottawa Cablevision =

Defunct Canadian cable company

Ottawa Cablevision was a cable television provider in the Ottawa region, operating primarily in the western half of the city.

== History ==
Ottawa Cablevision was founded in 1965 by a small group of local entrepreneurs including Gordon Henderson and Howard Darwin. Henderson served as President of the company while Darwin served as Vice-President.

Cable television arrived in Nepean Township in late 1964 when Ottawa Cablevision began offering service in Lynwood Village and then Manordale, Ontario. The service provided Ottawa’s three over‑the‑air channels (CBOT, CBOFT and CJOH), plus U.S. signals from Watertown, and stations from Kingston and Montreal, for about $5/month, along with FM radio distribution. Within a year, more than 30% of households with TVs in Nepean subscribed.

In 1966, after a public bidding process, Ottawa City Council awarded cable franchises for the western and eastern halves of the city. Ottawa Cablevision won exclusive rights to serve the western side (west of Bank Street), while Skyline Cablevision received the eastern portion. Ottawa Cablevision extended cable service rapidly to neighborhoods such as Copeland Park by late October and Bel Air Park by November 1966, followed by rollouts across the rest of western Ottawa.

Ottawa Cablevision ceased to exist as an independent company in 1989, when it was acquired by Maclean-Hunter Communications Ltd., one of Canada’s largest media conglomerates at the time. Selkirk Communications held a large share in the company.

=== The NABU Network ===
Ottawa Cablevision pioneered one of Canada’s first cable‑based home computer networks, known as the NABU Network, launched in October 1983. The NABU Personal Computer could be rented or purchased, but high costs and limited subscriber uptake (only ~1,500 in Ottawa by late 1984) led to financial collapse. The venture ceased in November 1984, and the successor company ceased operations in August 1986.
