= Gordon Smith Henderson =

Dr. Gordon Smith Henderson KC
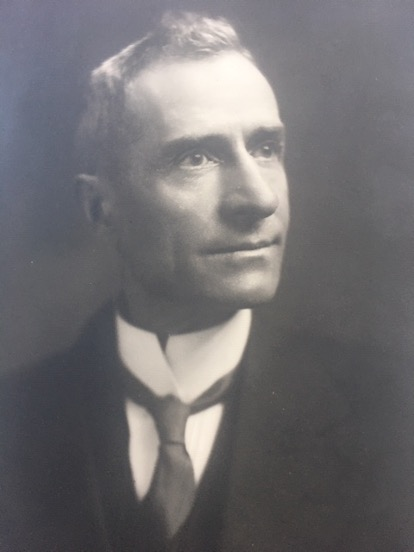
- Henderson in 1896
- Born: July 10, 1866; Scotland
- Died: July 16, 1938 (aged 72); Ottawa, Ontario
- Education: University of Toronto
- Political party: Liberal Party of Ontario
- Spouse: Charlotte Stratton (1906-1938)
- Children: Gordon F. Henderson
- Father: William Henderson

Gordon Smith Henderson KC (July 10, 1866 - July 16, 1938) was a Scottish-Canadian Criminal defense lawyer and political figure in Ottawa. He was involved in many criminal cases and was very active in the liberal party of Canada.

== Personal life and family ==
He was born in Aberdeen, Scotland to William Henderson and Mary Henderson. In 1872, his father moved to Ottawa, and in 1879 to British Columbia. His brother was Stuart Alexander Henderson who was described as one of the best criminal defense lawyers of his time. Gordon married Charlotte Stratton in 1906, the adopted daughter of Charles Billings, at the Billings Estate. In 1912, they had a son, Gordon F. Henderson who became one of Canada's most prominent lawyers. He died in 1938 at the age of 72.

== Law career ==
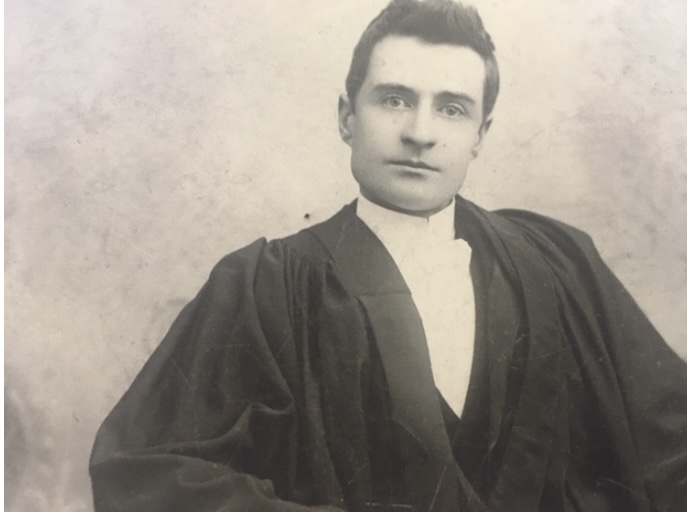
Henderson in 1896

Henderson attended the University of Toronto and was called to the bar in 1893. He mainly practiced his profession alone, except for a few years when he was a member of the law firm Fripp Henderson & McGee. Henderson was the Crown attorney of Perth, Pembroke, and L'Orignal before 1906. He became a very well-known criminal defense lawyer in Ontario. J. P. Madden said, "It would be difficult to find a case which could be tried under the criminal code in which Dr. Henderson had not appeared." M. J. O'Connor said of Henderson, "His long and brilliant career reflected high honor on the bar of Canada." Upon his appointment of King's Counsel, in 1929, he was described as "very prominent as a criminal lawyer and had many notable cases. In addition to successfully defending many accused, he has also acted as Crown prosecutor." Duncan MacTavish said of him, "His career at the bar extended over a period of many years and was marked by a large measure of success, particularly in jury and criminal cases. By his death, the Bar of Ottawa has lost one of its most widely known and popular members."

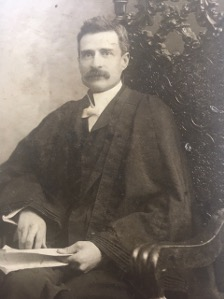
Henderson in 1906

Henderson was noted as being somewhat eccentric. He did not have a telephone, calling it "a terrible waste of time." Upon his appointment to King's counsel, the newspaper described him as "radical and iconoclast."

=== Notable Cases ===
Henderson was the Crown Prosecutor of Clement Goyette, who was hanged for murder. After this case, Henderson only defended clients.

He defended Annie Balcomb, who was charged with murder for performing an illegal abortion. She was acquitted.

Henderson defended Patrick Mahoney, an Ottawa police officer charged with murder.

Henderson was senior counsel for the defense of Louis Auger after he was accused of raping a young woman in the House of Commons.

== Political career ==
He was a lifelong liberal and ran for office twice, losing both times. He was a prominent member of the Liberal party in Ontario and was often a speaker at political rallies. In the 1911 Ontario general election, he lost to Arthur Ellis in Ottawa West. In the 1926 Ontario general election Henderson lost to Albert Honeywell in Ottawa North. Henderson was a strong supporter of full prohibition and he supported the abolition of the bar in Canada. After Ernest Charles Drury came to power in 1919, it was rumored that Gordon Henderson would become the Attorney General of Ontario. The Toronto Telegram said that William Raney, who became the Attorney General, was the first pick, and Henderson was the runner-up.
