= Society of Composers, Authors and Music Publishers of Canada =

Canadian rights society

- Merger of: Composers, Authors and Publishers Association of Canada, Performing Rights Organization of Canada
- Headquarters: Toronto, Ontario, Canada
- President & Board Chair: Marc Ouellette
- CEO: Jennifer Brown
- Subsidiaries: Canadian Songwriters Hall of Fame
- Website: https://www.socan.com/

The Society of Composers, Authors and Music Publishers of Canada (SOCAN) is a Canadian nonprofit performance rights organization that represents the performing rights of more than 175,000 songwriters, composers and music publishers. The organization collects licensing fees through a music licensing program approved by the Copyright Board of Canada.

The Canadian Songwriters Hall of Fame and the SOCAN Foundation are divisions of SOCAN. The Canadian Songwriters Hall of Fame works to "honour and celebrate Canadian songwriters, and those who have dedicated their lives to the legacy of music, and to educate the public about their achievements", while the SOCAN Foundation provides awards, grant funding, and programs for Canadian musicians.

== Structure ==
SOCAN consists of a Board of Directors, an Executive Team, as well as five committees which support the Board of Directors. The five committees include the Membership Committee, Reproduction Rights Committee, Risk and Audit Committee, Tariff, Licensing and Distribution Committee, and the Executive Governance Committee.

The current chair of the Board of Directors is Marc Ouellette.

== History ==
SOCAN is a result of a merger that took place in 1990 between the Composers, Authors and Publishers Association of Canada (CAPAC) and the Performing Rights Organization of Canada (PROCAN).

In 2013, Front Row Insurance Brokers Inc. initiated an online musical instrument insurance program for members of various Canadian music associations, including SOCAN.

In May 2016, SOCAN acquired the Seattle-based company Medianet Digital for an undisclosed amount; the organization planned to leverage the company's software and database of rights metadata to assist in the calculation and distribution of royalties for works on digital music streaming services. In July 2016, SOCAN acquired Audiam, a U.S. startup created by TuneCore founder Jeff Price that specializes in managing the distribution of royalties for songs used on digital services such as YouTube, using a database of song recordings and metadata for identification.

In July 2018, SOCAN completed its acquisition of SODRAC, to expand their service offering to include mechanical/reproduction rights.

In July 2019, SOCAN partnered with Re:Sound to launch Entandem, a single online portal to collect both copyright and neighbouring rights royalties.

In September 2021, SOCAN participated in consulting the Government of Canada on the development of a copyright framework which addresses the rise of artificial intelligence.

== SOCAN Awards ==
Since 1990, SOCAN has hosted annual awards celebrating achievements made by Canadian songwriters, composers, and musicians. Ceremonies are held in both Toronto and Montreal.

=== Award Categories ===
- Achievement in Feature Film
- Achievement in Made for TV Movie
- Alternative Music
- Anglophone Song
- Audio-Visual Composer of the Year/Compositeur audio-visuel de l'annee
- Chanson Revelation
- Children's Music
- Composer of the Year/Compositeur de l'annee
- Country Music/Musique Country
- Cultural Impact Award
- Dance Music/Musique Danse
- Domestic Animated TV Series Music
- Domestic Film Music
- Domestic Made for Television Film Music
- Domestic Non-Animated Television Series Music
- Domestic Television Music Award - Fictional Programming
- Domestic Television Music Award - Non-Fiction Programming
- Electronic Music
- Film & Television Music Award
- Folk/Roots Music
- Global Inspiration Award
- Gordon F. Henderson/Copyright
- Hagood Hardy Award
- International Achievement
- International Film Music
- International Folk Song
- International Made for Television Film Music
- International Song
- International Television Music Award
- International Television Series Music
- Jan V. Matejcek New Classical Music
- Lifetime Achievement
- Lifetime Achievement (Film/TV)
- Most Performed Foreign Song Award
- Pop Music/Musique Pop
- R&B Music/Musique R&B
- Rap Music/Musique Rap
- Rock Music/Musique Rock
- National Achievement
- News & Sports Television Programming Music
- Online Streaming Award
- Outstanding International Partner
- Patron Of Music
- SOCAN Breakout Award
- SOCAN Classic
- SOCAN Licensed to Play Award
- SOCAN Salutes
- Songwriter of the Year
- Special Achievement
- Urban Music
- Wm Harold Moon

== See also ==
- Entertainment Software Assn v Society of Composers, Authors and Music Publishers of Canada
- Society of Composers, Authors and Music Publishers of Canada v Bell Canada
- Society of Composers, Authors and Music Publishers of Canada v Canadian Assn of Internet Providers
