= Copper Island (disambiguation) =

Copper Island is a local name for the northern part of the Keweenaw Peninsula in northern Michigan, United States.

Copper Island may also refer to:

- Copper Island, an island in Lake Superior near Rossport, Ontario, where the Gunilda ran aground
- Medny Island, an island in the Bering Sea, part of Commander Islands
- Copper Island Aleut, a dialect of the Aleut language
- an island in Shuswap Lake, British Columbia, Canada
- one of the Wadham Islands of Newfoundland and Labrador, Canada

== See also ==
- Cooper Island (South Georgia)
