= Stuart Alexander Henderson =

Canadian politician

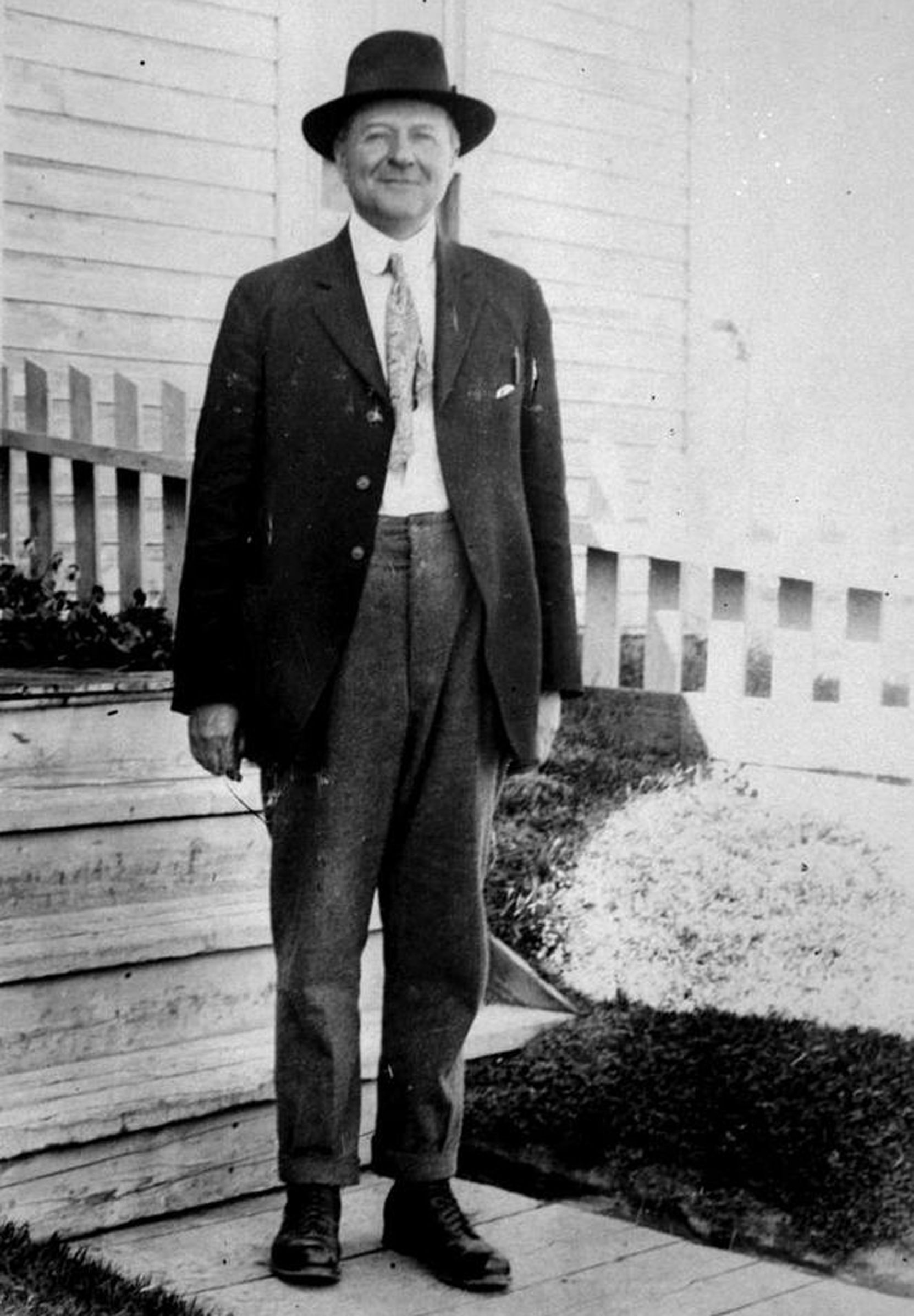
- Born: September 19, 1863, Lonmay, Aberdeenshire, Scotland
- Died: February 17, 1945 (aged 81) Victoria, British Columbia, Canada
- Education: University of Toronto, Osgoode Hall Law School
- Occupations: Politician, Criminal lawyer
- Political party: Liberal
- Father: William Henderson
- Relatives: Gordon Smith Henderson (brother)
- Family: Henderson family

Stuart Alexander Henderson (September 19, 1863 – February 17, 1945) was a Scottish-born lawyer and political figure in British Columbia. He represented Yale from 1903 to 1909 in the Legislative Assembly of British Columbia as a Liberal. Henderson was celebrated as the greatest Canadian criminal lawyer of his time.

== Life and career ==
He was born in Lonmay, Aberdeenshire, the son of William Henderson and Mary Jane Smith. He came to Ontario with his father in 1872 and was educated in Ottawa, at Toronto University and at Osgoode Hall. While in Ontario, he served as a lieutenant in the militia. Henderson was also an Ottawa alderman. He came to British Columbia in 1897 and entered the practice of law there the following year. Henderson was married twice: first to Alice London in 1890 and then to Mary Jane Losh in 1904. He was a director for the Mutual Life Company of Canada. He was defeated when he ran for reelection to the assembly in 1909 and again in Lillooet in 1912.

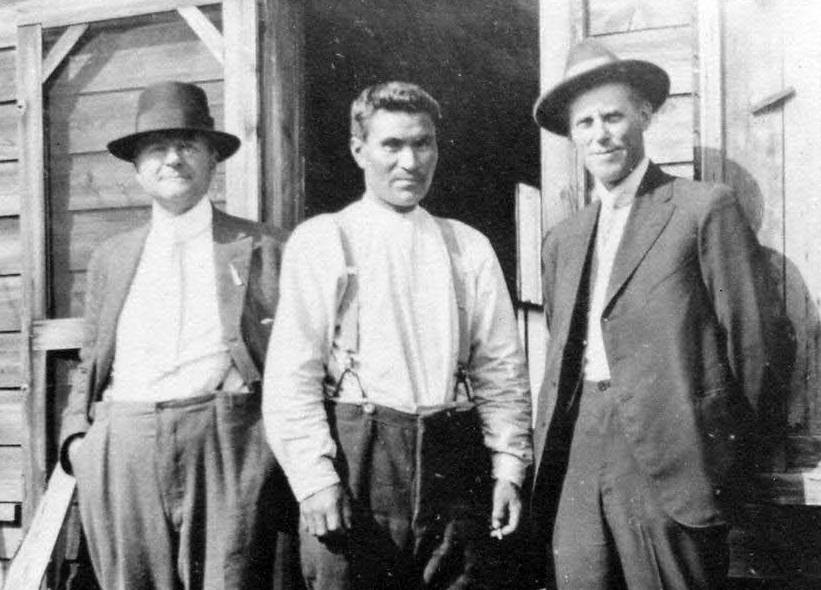
Henderson (left) with Simon Gunanoot on the steps of the courthouse

He was known as Canada's Clarence Darrow and a biographer said of him "He is a past master of technicalities and he spends almost as much time studying the committal papers as he does in coaching the witnesses. It is not greatly to the credit of prosecuting attorneys that he usually finds something wrong." In 50 murder trials only 5 were lost to the gallows and in that same time he had never refused a case. He was a firm believer in capital punishment. Many of his clients were Indians, most famously Simon Gunanoot who, In 1919, Henderson successfully defended against a charge of murder. He was welcomed on any reserve as a chief with the honorary title "Great White Friend." He died in Victoria at the age of 81.
