= Jonathan Barker =

Canadian film producer (died 2018)

Jonathan Curtis Barker (c. 1952 – July 5, 2018) was a Canadian film producer. He was the CEO of SK Films, which he co-founded with Wendy MacKeigan and Bob Kerr. On September 21, 2018, Barker was posthumously awarded the 2018 Giant Screen Cinema Association Outstanding Achievement Award.

== Early life and education ==
Barker was born in Chicago to Priscilla Curtis Barker and Anthony G.S. Griffin. He grew up in Montreal. Barker attended the Selwyn House School, the Trinity College School, the University of Toronto and McGill University.

== Personal life and death ==
Barker was married to Wendy MacKeigan and they had five children: Scott, Tyler, Georgia, Alex and Caleigh.

On July 5, 2018, Barker died of cancer in Toronto at the age of 66.

== Select filmography ==
- Camilla (1994)
- Journey to Mecca (2009)
