= Reach (boxing) =

Physical measurement

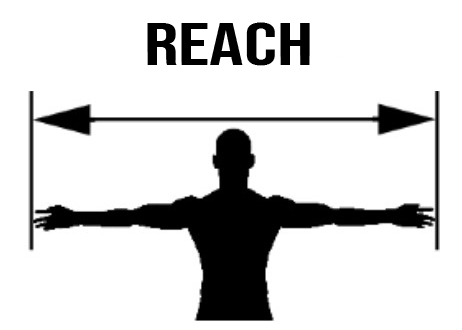
the total length of a fighter's arms from fingertip to fingertip

Reach (or Wingspan or Armspan) In boxing, is a critical physical measurement that refers to the total length of a fighter's arms from fingertip to fingertip when their arms are stretched out horizontally, parallel to the ground. This measurement, is distinct from arm length, which only measures the distance from shoulder to fist on one arm.

A boxer's reach is a significant tactical factor, as those with a longer reach can often land jabs and straight punches while maintaining a safe distance from a shorter opponent, effectively controlling the pace of the fight from the outside. Conversely, fighters with a shorter reach must rely on superior footwork, head movement, and inside fighting techniques to get within range to land hooks and uppercuts. Prominent examples of boxers known for their exceptional reach include Sonny Liston (84 inches) and Tyson Fury (85 inches).
