= Gowlings =

Canadian international law firm

Gowling WLG (Canada) LLP
- Company type: Limited Liability Partnership (Private)
- Industry: Law firm
- Founded: 1887; 139 years ago Ottawa, Ontario, Canada
- Products: Legal advice
- Services: Business law, litigation/advocacy, intellectual property

Gowling Lafleur Henderson LLP (Gowlings) was a Canadian and international law firm, with about 700 legal professionals in 10 offices in Canada, as well as in London, Moscow, and Beijing. The firm offered legal support in business law, advocacy/litigation and intellectual property law.

On July 8, 2015, Gowlings announced that they would amalgamate with UK firm Wragge Lawrence Graham & Co to create a new international law firm called Gowling WLG. The new firm launched in February 2016.

== History ==
Gowlings' originated with the firm Henderson & McVeity, which was founded in Ottawa in 1887. Its name passed through numerous permutations, but included references to the lawyers Gordon Gowling, George and Gordon Henderson. In the 1980s, the firm expanded beyond its traditional Ottawa base, establishing offices in Toronto, Kitchener, and Moscow.

Starting in the mid-1990s, Gowlings created a national platform through a succession of mergers with other law firms in Vancouver, Hamilton, Calgary, Montreal and Toronto. The firm eventually adopted the simple brand name "Gowlings" (which had long been in informal use).

== Notable firm members ==
- Leonard Brockington (1888–1966). Founding chairman of the CBC, 1936-1939
- Gordon F. Henderson (1912–1993). President of the Canadian Bar Association, 1979–1980; Chancellor of the University of Ottawa, 1991–1993
- Roy McMurtry (1932– ). Attorney-General of Ontario, 1975–1985 and Chief Justice of Ontario, 1996-2007
- Ray Hnatyshyn (1934–2002). 24th Governor-General of Canada, 1990–1995
- Ian Scott (1934–2006). Attorney-General of Ontario, 1985–1990
- Donald Mazankowski (1935– ). Deputy Prime Minister of Canada, 1986–1993
- Martin Cauchon (1962– ). Minister of Justice (Canada) and Attorney General of Canada, 2002–2003; Minister of National Revenue (Canada), 1999-2002
- Lawrence Cannon (1947– ). Minister of Foreign Affairs (Canada), 2006–2008 and Stephen Harper's former Quebec lieutenant
- Frank Marrocco (2005–). Associate Chief Justice of the Ontario Superior Court of Justice ,

== See also ==
- Goodman and Carr
