= Composers, Authors and Publishers Association of Canada =

Canadian copyright collective

The Composers, Authors and Publishers Association of Canada (French: Association des compositeurs, auteurs et éditeurs du Canada Ltée) was a Canadian copyright collective for the right to communicate with the public and publicly perform musical works. CAPAC administered these rights on behalf of its members (composers, lyricists, songwriters, and their publishers) and those of affiliated international organizations by licensing the use of their music in Canada. Royalties were paid to the music creators after administration costs were deducted to pay for the operation of CAPAC.

== History ==
CAPAC was established as a subsidiary of Great Britain's Performing Rights Society (PRS) under the name the Canadian Performing Rights Society (CPRS) in 1925. Its initial purpose was to administer the royalties of composers, lyricists and music publishers whose creations were performed in Canada, be they native Canadians or foreigners. The American Society of Composers, Authors and Publishers bought partial ownership of the CPRS in 1930. In 1945 CPRS became CAPAC through the Supplementary Letters Patent.

CAPAC developed a schedule under which broadcasters and cinema owners paid royalties for each playing of CAPAC music, while live music venues were required to purchase music performance licenses. Royalties were also collected when music was used in advertisements.

In 1950 CPAC changed its method of assessment from logging individual performances to collecting a percentage of revenues. Over the next few years the organization came into conflict with the Canadian Association of Broadcasters as well as a number of private supper clubs, who objected to paying the royalties and license fees assessed by CAPAC. While the issue was in the courts, both the stations and the clubs were enjoined from playing any CAPAC music unless they paid a percentage of their revenue to CAPAC. In 1955 the Supreme Court ruled that radio stations could decide either to pay 1% of their revenue to CAPAC or refrain from using CAPAC music.

By 1976 CAPAC had about 6,000 members and revenue of about $10 million.

In 1989 the organization merged with the Performing Rights Organization of Canada to form the Society of Composers, Authors and Music Publishers of Canada.

== See also ==
- Copyright collective
- List of copyright collection societies
- SOCAN
