= Reach Canada =

Legal servicescharity for disabled Canadians

- Abbreviation: RC
- Formation: 1981
- Type: Disability organization based in Canada
- Legal status: active
- Headquarters: 312 Parkdale Avenue; Ottawa, Ontario; K1Y 4X5
- Region served: Canada
- Official language: English, French
- Website: www.reach.ca

Reach Canada is a non-governmental organization that helps people with all types of disabilities obtain a lawyer referral. It is dedicated to educating and informing people with disabilities, lawyers and the general public about the rights and interests of persons with disabilities through programs, conferences and seminars. Reach also collaborates in several projects with the Judicial System of Canada.

== Background ==
Reach Canada was incorporated in 1981 as a non-profit, charitable organization and is based in Ottawa, Canada. The organization was founded by Rod Carpenter and Ernest G. Tannis to improve the quality of life of persons with disabilities by performing lawyer referrals and educational programs.

This NGO has successfully registered around 150 volunteer lawyers, in both the public and private sectors, in the Ottawa region. Lawyers in the private sector provide up to three hours on a pro bono basis to people with disabilities who contact Reach Canada for help.

In addition, these professionals volunteer their time to give conferences, seminars and lectures on topics related to disability, legal and social rights of persons with disabilities, among others.

== History highlights ==
In 1983, Justice Rosalie Abella of the Court of Appeal of Ontario, submitted her report on how the Government should respond to International Year of Disabled Persons. One recommendation was that Reach be identified as a community-based model worthy of supporting.

In 1985, Paula Agulnik started as a full-time executive-director. She continued in this position for 30 years. Joanne Silkauskas took over as executive director in 2016.

In 1986, on the occasion of Reach's fifth anniversary, Gordon Henderson, became Reach's first Honorary Chairperson.

1991 marked the 10th anniversary of Reach under the U.N. theme: "From Awareness to Implementation". Reach Canada hosted a national conference entitled: "Are We There Yet?"

In 1996, Ramon Hnatyshyn, former Minister of Justice and Attorney-General of Canada and former Governor-General of Canada, agreed to become Reach's Honorary Chairperson.

In 1998, Prime Minister of Canada, Jean Chrétien received, on behalf of Canadians, the prestigious Franklin D. Roosevelt International Disability Award at the UN after Reach successfully nominated Canada for this award.

== Run for Reach ==
For more than 30 years, in spring, Reach Canada organizes a sportive series of activities in the city of Ottawa. On April 8, 2012, John Stanton - founder of The Running Room and Walking Room and author of eight books - will lead one of the runs along and attend pre-race events.

"This is a sportive event that was first held in 1987 and has grown to include 1400 participants across all of its events. In 2005 and again in 2007, an inline skating race was added along the Queen Elizabeth Driveway in downtown Ottawa."

== Reach Canada's Auction ==
Reach's Auction is: "a high-profile event attended by more than 600 people. A committee of volunteers scours the region for companies and individuals willing to donate items to be auctioned. Additional items are included in a 'silent-auction', in which people submit written bids for items that are displayed. Celebrity auctioneers have included Bruce Gray (a star of the television program Traders), local restaurateur and philanthropist Dave Smith, and local radio personalities."

This auction has been present in the social life of Ottawa for over 30 years.

== Honorary Chairpersons ==
Gordon Henderson, Ramon Hnatyshyn, former General Governor of Canada. and Steven Fletcher have been Reach's Honorary Chairpersons. The current Honorary Chairperson is the Hon. John D. Richard, retired chief justice of Canada's Federal Court of Appeal.

== See also ==
- Council for Canadians with Disabilities
- Disability rights movement
