= Niobe Thompson =

Canadian anthropologist and documentary film maker

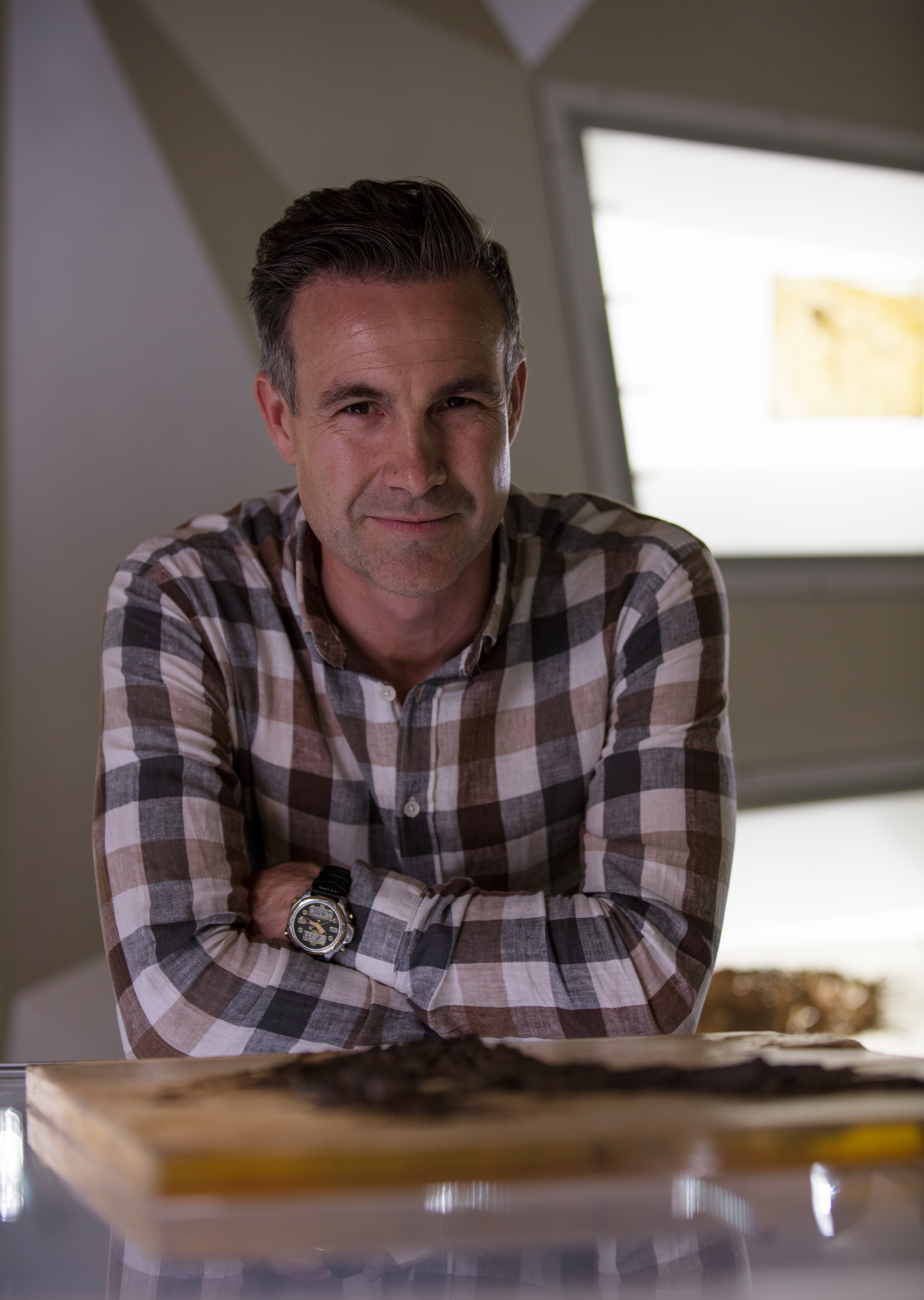
Niobe Thompson, 2017

Niobe Thompson is a Canadian anthropologist and documentary film maker. The founder of Handful of Films, he produces and hosts one-off and series documentaries in partnership with CBC's science-and-nature program The Nature of Things. He has won three Canadian Screen Awards for "Best Science and Nature Documentary" (Code Breakers, 2011; The Great Human Odyssey, 2015; Equus - Story of the Horse, 2019), his films have won 32 Alberta Film Awards, and he is a two-time winner of the Edmonton Film Prize.

Thompson studied Russian at the University of Alberta and McGill University before completing a masters at London's School of Slavonic and East European Studies. For his PhD at University of Cambridge's Scott Polar Research Institute he lived in Russia's remote Chukotka region, following the impact of Roman Abramovich's modernization program in the early 2000s. Four of his documentaries were partly filmed with indigenous people in Chukotka.

Thompson was raised partly in the northern Alberta Cree community of Wabasca-Desmarais, where his father Jamie Thompson made wood-canvas canoes. He speaks Russian, Danish and French. His mother Sharon Poetker Thompson is a landscape painter. Thompson described his ambition in film making, stating "I want my children Iris and Vita to grow up in a scientifically literate society, where films that explore the natural world play a central role"

Thompson credits conservationist David Suzuki and veteran Canadian filmmaker Tom Radford for his introduction to film. He also works with the Canadian verité specialist Rosvita Dransfeld.

== Documentaries ==
Thompson's Equus - Story of the Horse launched CBC's 2018/19 season of The Nature of Things. In this three-part series, Thompson explored the impact of horsepower on human history and joined in the lives of horse cultures in Siberia, Arabia, Mongolia and the Canadian Rockies. Filmed over two years with a small Canadian crew, this series had unique access to the discovery of a human skeleton in Kazakhstan belonging to the Botai culture, the earliest humans to domesticate horses. Thompson also collaborated with Martin Fischer at the University of Jena (Germany) to create the first accurate animation of "Dawn Horse", the ancestor of modern horses, using the 40m year old fossil remains of Eurohippus messelensis. The film crew was the first to capture the winter migration of Kazakh nomads living Mongolia's Altai Mountains, living and travelling with a family of herders over two weeks in early 2017.

In 2016, Thompson directed two related documentaries on organ transplant medicine, in collaboration with ID:Productions and the National Film Board of Canada. The feature-length Memento Mori and the one-hour Vital Bonds are based on exceptional access to one of Canada's busiest organ transplant hospitals, and feature sequences with a family losing their son to a fentanyl poisoning and making the decision to donate his organs. Vital Bonds debuted on CBC's The Nature of Things in November 2016.

For the three-part series on human origins, The Great Human Odyssey (2015), Thompson followed the emergence of modern humans in Africa and our subsequent settlement of the planet. Over 18 months of shooting, the crew worked in 17 countries on 5 continents, filming with the Badjao of the Philippines, the San Bushmen of the Namibian Kalahari, Chukchi nomads in Arctic Russia, and the Crocodile People of Papua New Guinea. In 2016, working with film composer Darren Fung, Thompson produced a live orchestral performance of Great Human Odyssey for the stage, which premiered with the Edmonton Symphony Orchestra.

For the feature documentary Tipping Point: Age of the Oil Sands (2011), Thompson featured Dene Elder Francois Paulette and director James Cameron. Code Breakers (2011), about the peopling of the Americas, includes the geneticist Eske Willerslev. For The Perfect Runner (2012), Thompson attempted the 125-km Canadian Death Race and featured the ultrarunner Diane Van Deren.

Also directed Transplanting Hope for PBS show NOVA Season 45 Episode 8 on 9/26/18. John McMillan was the composer for the episode and they have collaborated many times together.
