= Gordon Henderson (filmmaker) =

Canadian documentary film producer

Gordon Henderson is a Canadian documentary film producer, director, writer, and chairman of his production company, 90th Parallel Productions. Henderson has directed, written, or produced hundreds of films over his career. His films have been nominated for 10 Geminis, winning two, and In 2023 he received the Canadian Screen Award for Best Factual Series. Henderson has a reputation for running one of Toronto's most successful production houses.

== Career ==
Henderson began his career as a Global TV parliamentary correspondent. He went on to produce documentaries for CBC and was the senior field producer at CTV's W5. He has directed many documentaries with Lloyd Robertson and worked closely with Bill Cameron. Henderson was the senior series producer for Canada: A People's History for which he won a Gemini award. Mark Starowicz wrote, "The series would have been totally impossible without Gordon Henderson, his respect for the human story, and his sense of wonder at Canadian history.” In 1987 Henderson founded his own production company, 90th Parallel. Henderson credits the 1994 film "The Choirmaster" with putting 90th Parallel on the map and John Haslett Cuff of the Globe said of the film, “This is an intelligent, restrained, and thoughtful film that poses a number of difficult questions about the case.” International broadcasters soon picked it up despite its local focus. 90th Parallel is respected throughout Canada as a premier high-end documentary production house. Henderson has been involved in the production of many films, including Inconvenient Indian, Bipolarized, Nahanni: River of Forgiveness, and The Skin We're In (film).

Henderson has authored or co-authored three books:

- Man In The Shadows: A Novel. Published by HarperCollins in 2014. Re-published by At Bay Press in2025
- Out of the Shadows: A Novel with David Bouchard Published by At Bay Press in 2024
- Sandy Mackenzie, why Look So Glum?: Rhymes and Pictures about Our Prime Ministers. Published by Deneau and Greenberg in 1980.

For over a decade, Henderson was an instructor in the journalism department at Ryerson University in Toronto.

== Awards ==
Henderson was won two Gemini awards and has been nominated 8 times. His films have won awards in New York, Chicago, Houston, Columbus, Yorkton, Telluride, Banff, China, and Paris.

=== Awards and nominations ===
Year	Ceremony	Category	Film	Result	Ref
1998	13th Gemini Awards	Best Science, Technology, Nature and Environment Documentary Program	Superbugs	Nominated	
2000	15th Gemini Awards	Best History/Biography Documentary Program	Ambition: The Life & Times of Ted Rogers	Nominated	
2000	15th Gemini Awards	Best Performing Arts Program or Series, or Arts Documentary Program or Series	Tall Tales From The Long Corner: The Life and Times of Ronnie Hawkins	Won	
2001	16th Gemini Awards	Best Documentary Series	Canada: A People's History	Won	
2001	16th Gemini Awards	Best Performing Arts Program or Series, or Arts Documentary Program or Series	The Life & Times of Alex Colville	Nominated	
2002	17th Gemini Awards	Best Science, Technology, Nature, Environment or Adventure Documentary Program	The Cold Embrace	Nominated	
2005	20th Gemini Awards	Best Biography Documentary Program	The Life and Times of Peter C. Newman	Nominated	
2005	20th Gemini Awards	Best Sports Program or Series	The Hockey Nomad	Nominated	
2006	21st Gemini Awards	Best History Documentary Program	The Secret Mulroney Tapes	Nominated	
2007	22nd Gemini Awards	Donald Brittain Award for Best Social/Political Documentary Program	Faith Without Fear	Nominated	
2007	22nd Gemini Awards	Best Science, Technology, Nature, Environment or Adventure Documentary Program	Light at the Edge of the World	Nominated	
2009	24th Gemini Awards	Best Documentary Series	The Adventurers	Nominated	
2011	26th Gemini Awards	Best Cross-Platform Project - Non-Fiction	We Will Remember Them	Nominated	
2011	26th Gemini Awards	Best Documentary Series	Geologic Journey	Nominated	
2014	2nd Canadian Screen Awards	Science or Nature Documentary Program or Series	Wind Rush	Nominated	
2017	6th Canadian Screen Awards	Social/Political Documentary Program (Donald Brittain Award)	The Skin We're In (film)	Nominated	
2019	8th Canadian Screen Awards	Best Feature Length Documentary	Invisible Essence: The Little Prince	Nominated	
2020	9th Canadian Screen Awards	Science or Nature Documentary Program or Series (Rob Stewart Award)	The Nature of Things	Nominated	
2023	11th Canadian Screen Awards	Best Factual Series	We’re All Gonna Die (Even Jay Baruchel)	Won	

== Personal life and family ==
Henderson is the son of Canadian Lawyer Gordon F. Henderson and Joan Parkins. He is married and has three grown children, including Stuart Henderson, who works alongside him at 90th Parallel.

He has sat on multiple volunteer boards, including Face the Future, Opera Atelier, and Tafelmusik Baroque Orchestra.
