= Performing Rights Organization of Canada =

Canadian music licensing organization, 1940–1990

The Performing Rights Organization of Canada (PROCAN) was the second collective administering public performance rights in Canada. In 1990 it merged with the Composers, Authors and Publishers Association of Canada to create the Society of Composers, Authors and Music Publishers of Canada.

== History ==
PROCAN was founded in 1940 as BMI Canada Limited, a part of the US company Broadcast Music, Inc. In 1947, under the leadership of William Harold Moon, it began taking a more active role on behalf of Canadians, attracting new affiliates from around the world. In 1976, BMI Canada's shares were acquired by Music Promotion Foundation, and in 1977, its name was changed to Performing Rights Organization of Canada, now a fully Canadian nonprofit organization. In 1977, William Harold Moon became PRO Canada's first chairman of the board, and Gordon Henderson its first president. Upon Moon's death, Henderson succeeded him as chairman of the board, and Jan Matejcek became president. By 1989, the organization represented 21,018 writers and composers and 3456 publishers.

In 1984, negotiations began about a possible merger between PROCAN and CAPAC. In 1990, the two, alongside the Music Promotion Foundation, merged to form SOCAN. Henderson was in charge of both PROCAN and the MPF while CAPAC was headed by John Mills. Upon the creation of SOCAN, Jan Matejcek became its first CEO, and Gordon Henderson later became its chairman.
