= Reach (mathematics) =

Let X be a subset of R^{n}. Then the reach of X is defined as

$$\text{reach}(X) :=
\sup \{r \in \mathbb{R}:
\forall  x \in \mathbb{R}^n\setminus X\text{ with }{\rm dist}(x,X) < r \text{ exists a unique closest point }y \in X\text{ such that }{\rm dist}(x,y)= {\rm dist}(x,X)\}.$$

== Examples ==
Shapes that have reach infinity include

- a single point,
- a straight line,
- a full square, and
- any convex set.

The graph of ƒ(x) = |x| has reach zero.

A circle of radius r has reach r.
