= Cooper Islands =

Group of islands in Alaska, United States

Coordinates: 52°54′56″N 173°14′17″E

Cooper Islands, off of Attu Island, Alaska, U.S.A.

The Cooper Islands are a group of small islands located 1.6 km (1 mi) off the northeast coast of Attu Island, Alaska, United States. They extend 0.48 km (0.3 mi) into the Bering Sea. The islands were named in July 1855 for the schooner USS Fenimore Cooper by Lt. William Gibson, USN.
