= Adieu Alouette =

1973 Canadian television series

- Genre: documentary
- Country of origin: Canada
- Original language: English
- No. of seasons: 1
- No. of episodes: 12

Production
- Producer: Ian McLaren
- Running time: 30 minutes

Original release
- Network: CBC Television
- Release: 3 January – 25 April 1973

Adieu Alouette is a Canadian television documentary anthology series on the life and culture of Quebec. It was produced by the National Film Board of Canada for the network and aired on CBC Television in 1973.

== Premise ==
The series was intended to portray Quebec's culture to English Canada and to dispel misconceptions about the province, particularly in response to the 1970 October Crisis and the rise of the Quebec sovereignty movement. The series approach was cultural and apolitical.

== Scheduling ==
The series was first aired on CBC on Wednesdays, 10:30 p.m. (Eastern) from 3 January to 25 April 1973. It was repeated on Sundays, 2:00 pm from 6 January to 24 March 1974. The series consisted of 11 half-hour episodes plus the hour-long "Why I Sing: The Words and Music of Gilles Vigneault".

=== Episodes ===
Airdates are provided where known.

- "Why I Sing: The Words and Music of Gilles Vigneault" (originally aired 7 February 1973): this was an hour-long episode of the series directed by John Howe.
- "Just Another Job (Les Nordiques)" (14 February 1973): Pierre Letarte was director.
- "La Gastronomie" (7 March 1973): Doug Jackson was director.
- "La Quebecoise" (28 March 1973): Les Nirenberg was director.
- "Le Devoir: 1910–1945, Do What You Must" (18 April 1973): This was the first half of a two-part history on the Montreal newspaper Le Devoir. Hugues Poulin and Jean-V. Dufresne directed these episodes.
- "Le Devoir: 1945–1973, The Quiet Revolution" (25 April 1973): A continuation of the history of Le Devoir.
- "The Ungrateful Land: Roch Carrier Remembers Ste-Justine": Cynthia Scott was director.
- "Une Job Steady ... Un Bon Boss": Ian McLaren directed this episode about Yvon Deschamps.
- "OK... Camera": Michael Rubbo was director.
- "Backyard Theatre": Jean-V. Dufresne and Ian McLaren produced this episode, with Pierre Lefebvre as director. This featured André Brossard and playwright Michel Tremblay.
- "Challenge for the Church": William Weintraub was director.
- "In Our Own Way": Jack Zolov was director.
