= Bob Henderson (academic) =

Robert Henderson is a Canadian academic, author, and outdoor educator. He is recognized for his role in advancing heritage travel and wilderness education in Canada. In 2023, he and Sean Blenkinsop won a Next Generation Indie Award in Anthology for their book Paddling Pathways.

== Life and career ==
Henderson has been teaching in the outdoors and guiding trips since 1973. He served as a professor and coordinator of Outdoor and Environmental Education at McMaster University for 29 years (1981–2010), splitting his responsibilities between the Department of Kinesiology and Arts & Science. During his tenure, he led field‑based courses in both summer and winter, emphasizing experiential learning.

Henderson played an active mentoring role across multiple universities: supervising theses and serving on committees at McMaster, Royal Roads, Lakehead, York, Brock, Linköping (Sweden), and University of Calgary.

For over 20 years, Henderson served as a coordinator of the editorial board for Pathways: The Ontario Journal of Outdoor Education. Additionally, he has been the resource editor for Nastawgan: The Quarterly Journal of the Wilderness Canoe Association since 2008.

Since retiring in 2010, he has continued speaking across the world. In 2012, he gave a TEDx talk.

== Awards ==
In 2006, Henderson won the Association for Experiential Education's Michael Stratton Practitioner of the Year Award. The award honors "an experiential practitioner who can bring about significant change for impact in the lives of students, participants or clients.”

From the Council of Outdoor Educators of Ontario, he received the President's award in 1991, The Dorthy Walter Award for Leadership in 1998, The Honorary Life Membership Award in 2000, and The Robin Dennis Award in 2013.

In 2011, he was awarded The Ontario University Student Association's Award for Excellence in Teaching.

== Books ==
He has authored and co-edited several books including:

Henderson, B. (2005). Every Trail Has a Story: Heritage Travel in Canada. Toronto: Natural Heritage Books.

Henderson, B. (2014). More Trails, More Tales: Exploring Canada's Travel Heritage. Toronto: Dundurn Press.

Henderson, B., & Vikander, N. (Eds.). (2007). Nature First: Outdoor Life the Friluftsliv Way. Toronto: Natural Heritage Books.

Henderson, B., & Blenkinsop, S., (Eds.). (2021). Paddling Pathways: Reflections from a Changing Landscape. Owen Sound, ON: Ginger Press.

- Winner. 2023 Next Generation Indie Book Awards: Anthology.
- Finalist. 2023 Next Generation Indie Book Awards: Education/Academic (Non-Fiction).
- Finalist. 2023 Whistler Independent Book Awards: Non-Fiction.
- Grand Prize Finalist. 2023 Eric Hoffer Book Awards.
