= Culture of Kathmandu =

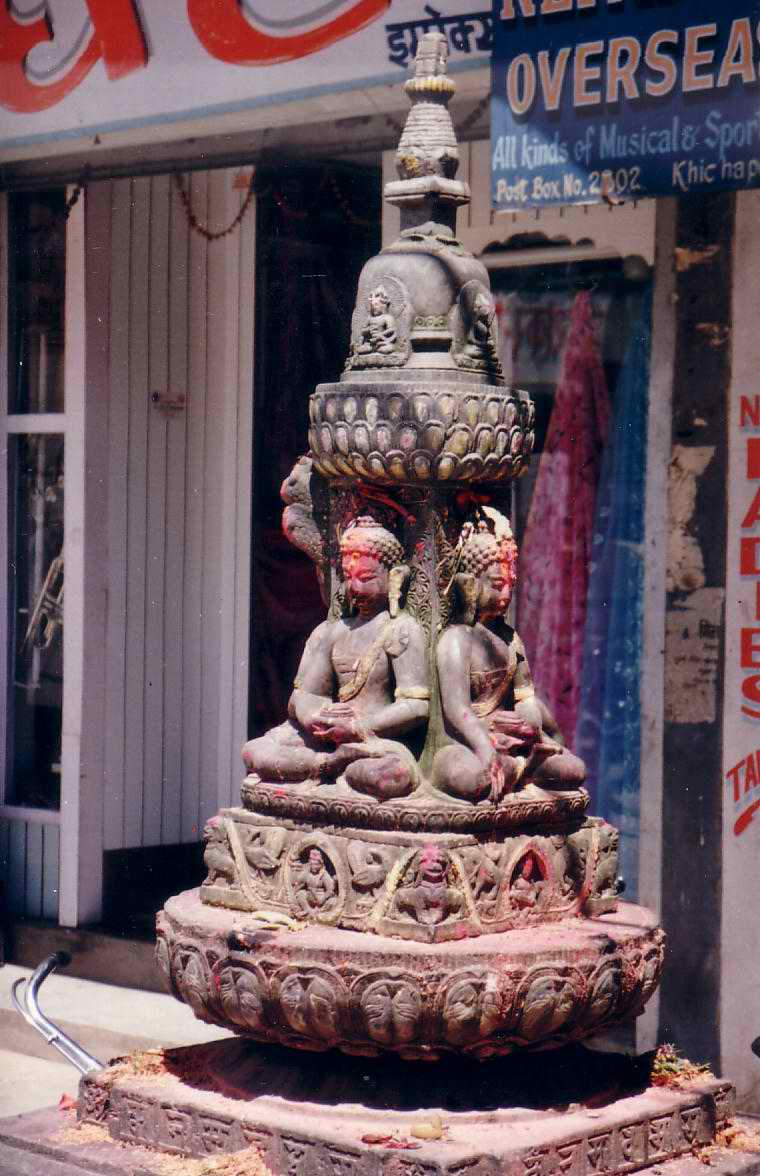
Stone carvings, called Chaityas, seen even in street corners and courtyards

The ancient and refined traditional culture of Kathmandu, for that matter in the whole of Nepal, is an uninterrupted and exceptional meeting of the Hindu and Buddhist ethos practiced by its highly religious people. It has also embraced in its fold the cultural diversity provided by the other religions such as Kirat, Jainism, Islam and Christianity.

The ancient trade route between India and Tibet that passed through Kathmandu enabled fusion of artistic and architectural traditions of other cultures to be amalgamated with local architectural and artistic culture.

The City Core has most of the remarkable cultural wealth that evolved during the reign of the Malla kings between 15th and 18th centuries. The city was filled with sculptures, pagodas, stupas and palace buildings of exceptional beauty. There are also 106 monastic courtyards (known as baha or bahi) known for their art and piety. The level of skill of the local artisans are the exquisite wood carving, stone carving, metal casting, weaving, pottery and other crafts. The finest wood carvings are seen on the ornate windows of old buildings and on the roof struts of temples. Carving skills of the local artisans are seen at every street corner in the form of images of gods and goddesses and sunken water spouts.

== Arts ==
Kathmandu valley has been described as "an enormous treasure house of art and sculptures". These treasures are made of wood, stone, metal and terracotta, and found in profusion in various temples, shrines, stupas, gompas, chaityas and palaces. The art objects are also seen in street corners, lanes, private courtyards and in open ground; mostly in the form of icons of gods and goddesses. Kathmandu valley has been the repository of all this art treasure for a long time but it got a worldwide exposure only after the country opened its doors to the outside world in 1950.

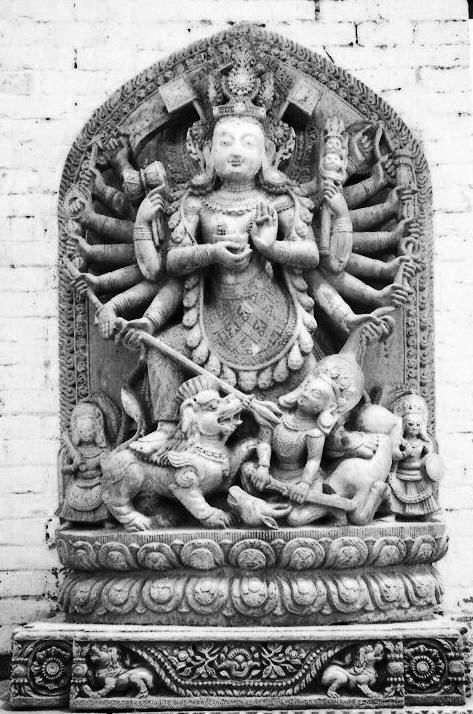
Kathmandu

The religious art of Nepal and Kathmandu in particular is iconic symbolism of the Mother Goddesses such as: the Bhavani, Durga, Gaja -Lakshmi, Hariti-Sitala, Mahsishamardini, Saptamatrika (seven mother goddesses) and Sri-Lakshmi. From the 3rd century BC, apart from the Hindu Gods and Goddesses, Buddhist monuments from the Ashokan period (it is said that Ashoka visited Nepal in 250 BC) have also embellished Nepal in general and the valley in particular. These art and architectural edifices encompass three major periods of evolution namely, the Licchavi or classical period (500 to 900 AD) with motivation from the Gupta period in India; the post-classical period (1000 to 1400 AD) with strong influence of the Palla art form that extended to Tibet as well; and of the Malla period (1400 onwards) that exhibited explicitly tantric influences coupled with the demonic art of the Tibetan Demonology.

A broad typology has been ascribed to the decorative designs and impressive carvings created by the creative and artistic people of Nepal, who have maintained a perfect blend of the two religious faiths of Hinduism and Buddhism. This typology based on the type of material used in the art forms is five in number. These are: the Stone Art, the Metal Art; the Wood Art; the Terracotta Art; and the Painting. These are briefly elaborated.

Stone art

In the earliest times, at the dawn of civilization, stone heaps (made of boulders, pebbles etc.) were worshipped in Nepal, which is seen at several locations. The first real stone carvings started under the influence of the Mathura Art of India; some of these carvings are seen in the Pashupathinath temple complex. Later in mid 5th century AD Nepal Art evolved under the Ikshvaku, Gupta, Pala and Deccan Schools of Art forms. But the Nepalese sculptors improved on these forms which provide a typical style of Nepal.

Metal art

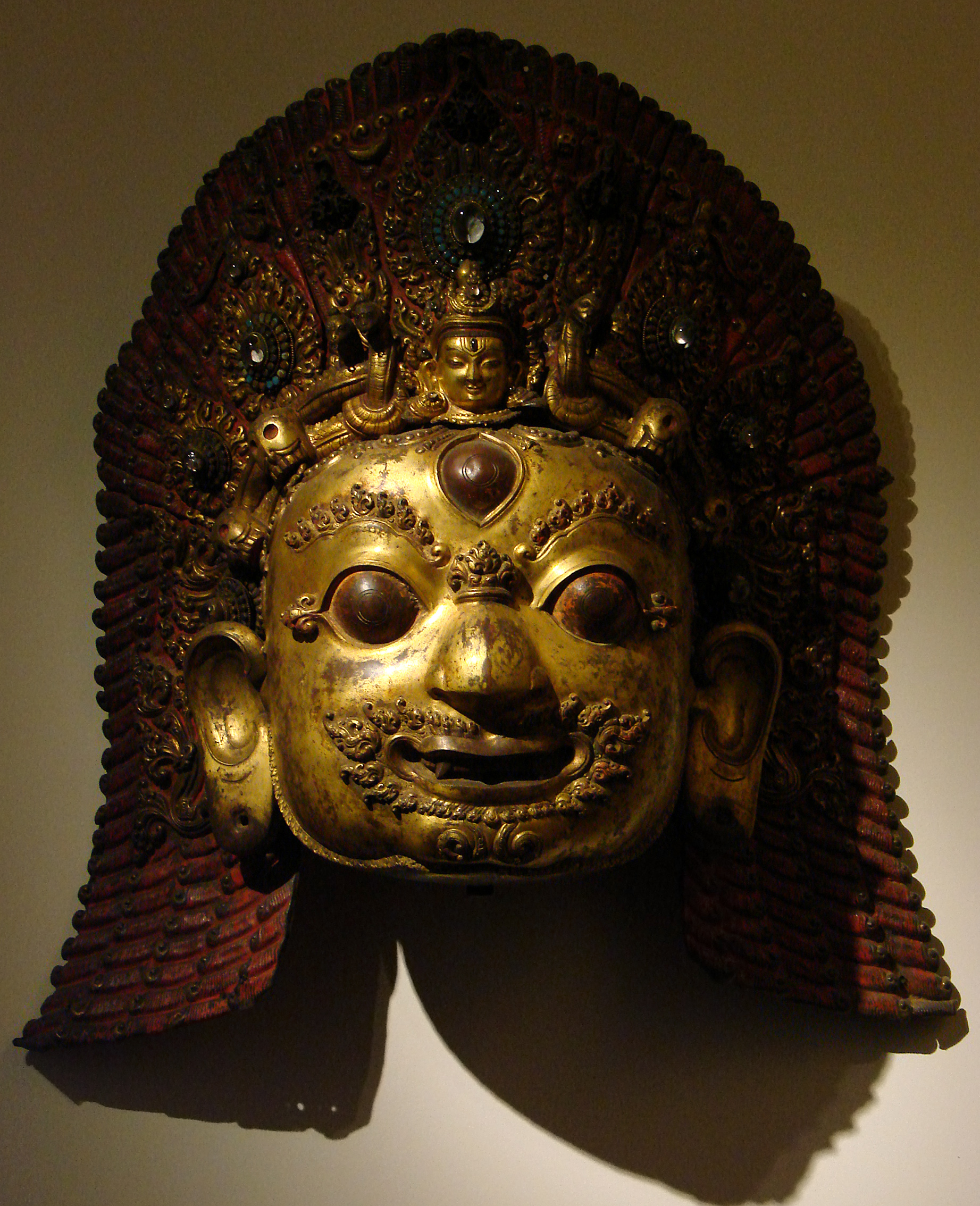
Mask of Bhairava

Metal images made of ashtadhatu (amalgam of eight metals) are common in Nepal and Indi, under both Hindu and Buddhist religious traditions. During the Licchavi period bronze in solid form was widely used for casting metallic sculptures; mostly between the seventh and eight centuries. But in the Medieval period Pala influence evolved into a distinct form. These can be seen in the form of large royal figures fixed on top of pillars in Durbar Squares of Kathmandu, Patan and Bhaktapur. Smaller and hollow cast bronze statues were made as icons for worship. In Tiebtan metal work, a hole was left in the bronze statues for filling with mantras written on paper or filling with offering of grains, precious stones or miniature icons. But the hole was sealed with copper in the presence of a Lama before formal consecration of the image. Here again there are two forms- one of Gods and Goddesses of Mahayana school in Pala art form and the other iconography inspiration of the Shamanic practice of Tibetan Demonology.

Wood art

It is the traditional architecture in the Kathmandu valley in temples, palaces, monasteries and houses a perfected Neawri art form generally carved very artistically out of Sal (Shorea), teak (agarth), deodar (cedrus) and Sisso (dalbegia). Malla Kings patronized this art form from 12th century onwards. Its life span is affected by mild climate, lichens, mosses, insects, borers, dry rots and biochemical defects. In the 14th century earthquake many of the wooden monuments were destroyed.

Terra cotta

Tera cotta art in Nepal is traced to the 300 BC. It was perfected between 16th and 18th centuries Archeological excavations have unearthed hand-pressed moulds at Dhum Varahi at the fringes of Kathmandu, which are preserved in the museums in Kathmandu, Patan and Bhaktapur. The male and female figures decorated in bands around temples, called Nagabands were made of terra cotta. Other fine examples of terra cotta art mentioned are Mahabuddha and Mayadevi temples in Patan and gateway of the Teleju temple in Hanumandhoka complex. Clay is the basic ingredient of this art form .

Paintings

Paintings are categorized under two broad head namely the religious and the non-religious. The religious category is further subdivided into three forms of painted manuscripts, Thangkas or Paubhas and Pattas (banners) or metal strips.

=== Museums ===
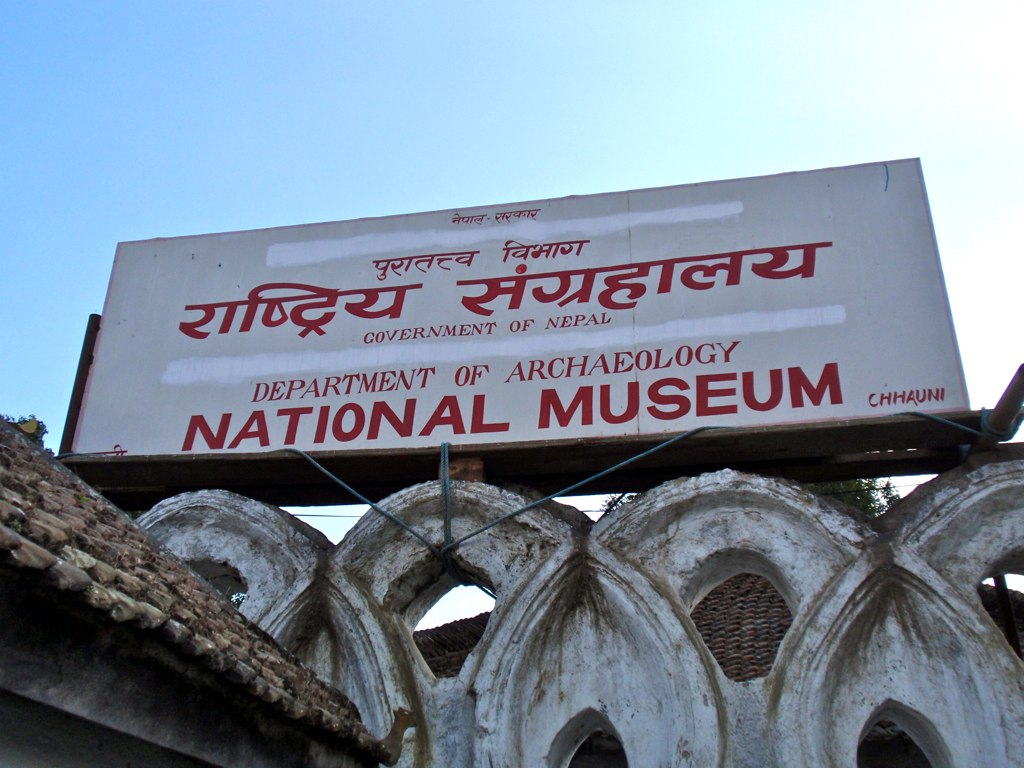
National Museum of Nepal

Kathmandu is home to a number of museums and art galleries, including the National Museum of Nepal and the Natural History Museum of Nepal. Nepals's art and architecture is a dazzling display from medieval to the present, which is a heady amalgamation of two of the ancient and greatest religions of the world – Hinduism and Buddhism. These are amply reflected not only in the many temples, shrines, stupas, monasteries and palaces in the seven well defined Monument Zones of the Kathmandu valley recognized by UNESCO as a World Heritage site but also in its well planned and well exhibited displays in museums and art galleries spread all over the Metropolitan area and also in its sister cities of Patan and Bhaktapur. The museums display unique artifacts and paintings from 5th century AD onwards to date, including archeological exportations.

The Museums and Art galleries are: the National Museum; the Natural History Museum; Hanumandhoka Palace Complex; the Tribhuvan Museum; the Mahendra Museum; the Birendra Museum; National Library: the Birendra Museum; the Kaiser Library; the Asa Archives; the Patan Museum; the National Art Gallery; the Pujarimath Museum; the Bronze and Brass Museum; the NAFA Gallery; the Srijana Contemporary Art Gallery; the J Art Gallery; the NEF-ART (Nepal Fine Art) Gallery; the Moti Azima Gallery; and the Nepal Art Council Gallery. Some of the important museums and galleries are elaborated.

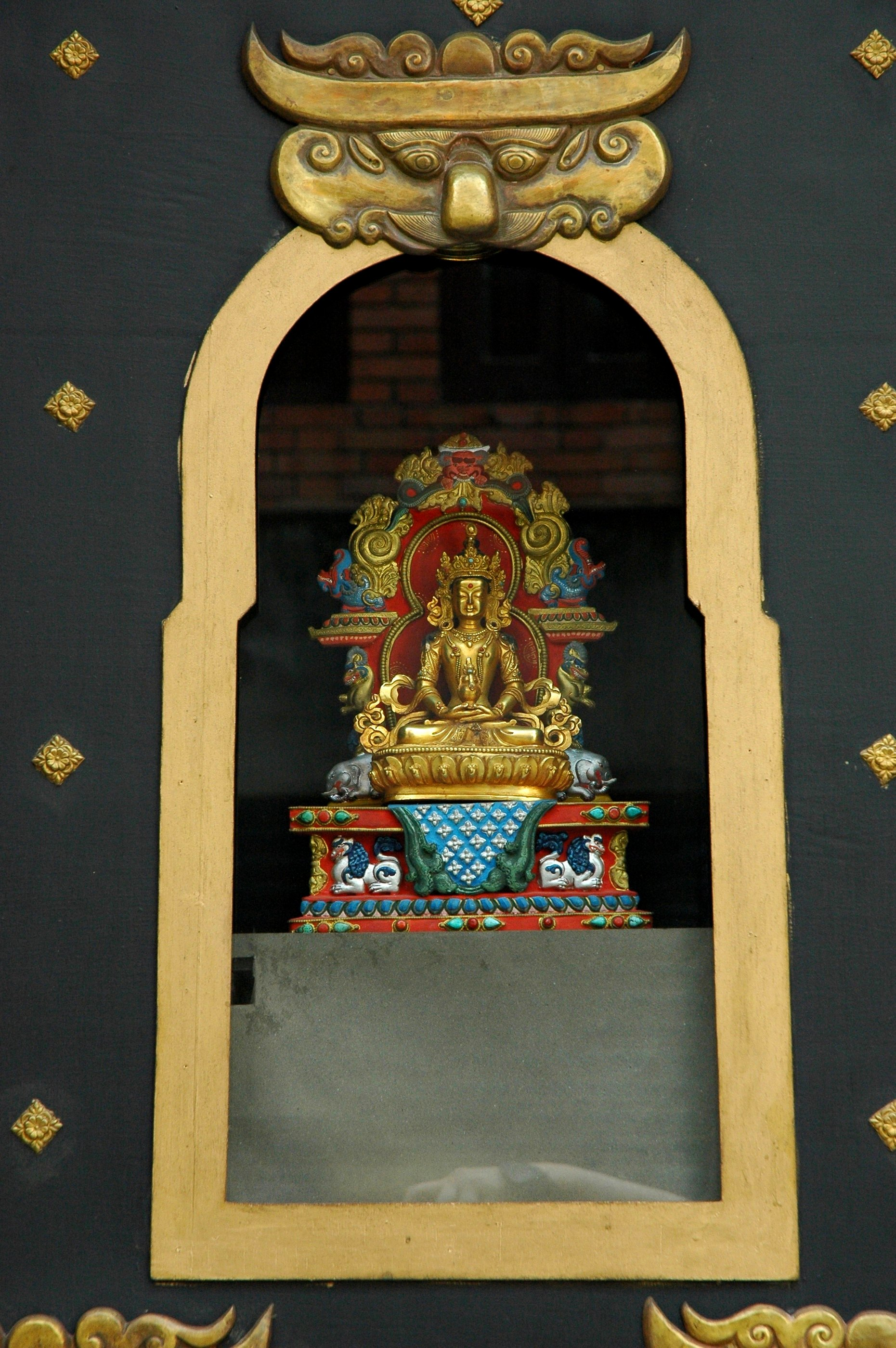
A Buddhist statue display in Kathmandu

The National Museum is located in the western part of Kathmandu near the Swoyambhunath stupa in the historical building which was constructed in early 19th century by General Bhimsen Thapa. It is the most important museum in the country, housing an extensive collection of weapons, art and antiquities of historic and cultural importance. The museum was established in 1928 as a collection house of war trophies and weapons, and the initial name of this museum was Chhauni Silkhana, which literally means "the stone house of arms and ammunition". Given its focus, the museum contains an extensive quantity of weapons, including locally made firearms used in various wars and leather cannons from the 18th–19th century and medieval and modern works in wood, bronze, stone, and paintings.

The Natural History Museum is located in the southern foothills of Swoyambhunath hill and has a sizeable collection of different species of animals, butterflies and plants. The museum is noted in particular for its serial display of diverse life species from prehistoric shells to the stuffed animals, birds, crocodiles and many others.

The Hanumandhoka Palace, a lavish medieval palace complex in the Durbar, contains three separate museums of historic importance: The Tribhuvan Museum contains artifacts related to the King Tribhuvan (1906–1955). It has a variety of pieces including his personal belongings, letters and papers and memorabilia related to events he was involved in and a rare collection of photos and paintings of Royal family members. The Mahendra Museum is also dedicated to a king, Mahendra (1920–1972 ). Like the Tribhuvan Museum, it includes his personal belongings such as decorations, stamps and coins and personal notes and manuscripts, but it also has structural reconstructions of his cabinet room and office chamber. The Birendra museum contains items related to the late monarch, King Birendra Bir Bikram Shah (1972–2001), including the royal dress worn during various state and historic occasions, medals and honorary titles received from other head of states and many more.

=== Art galleries ===
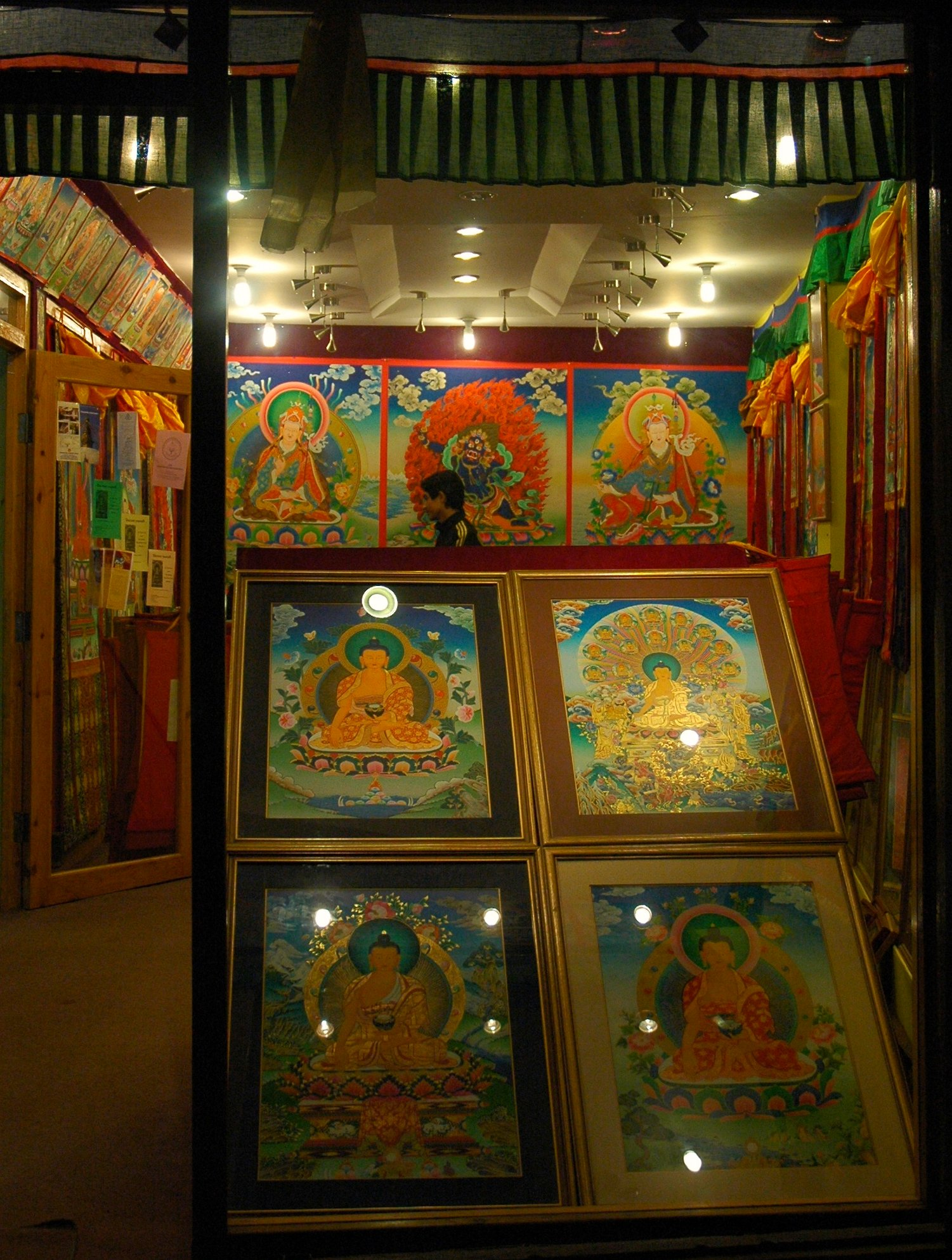
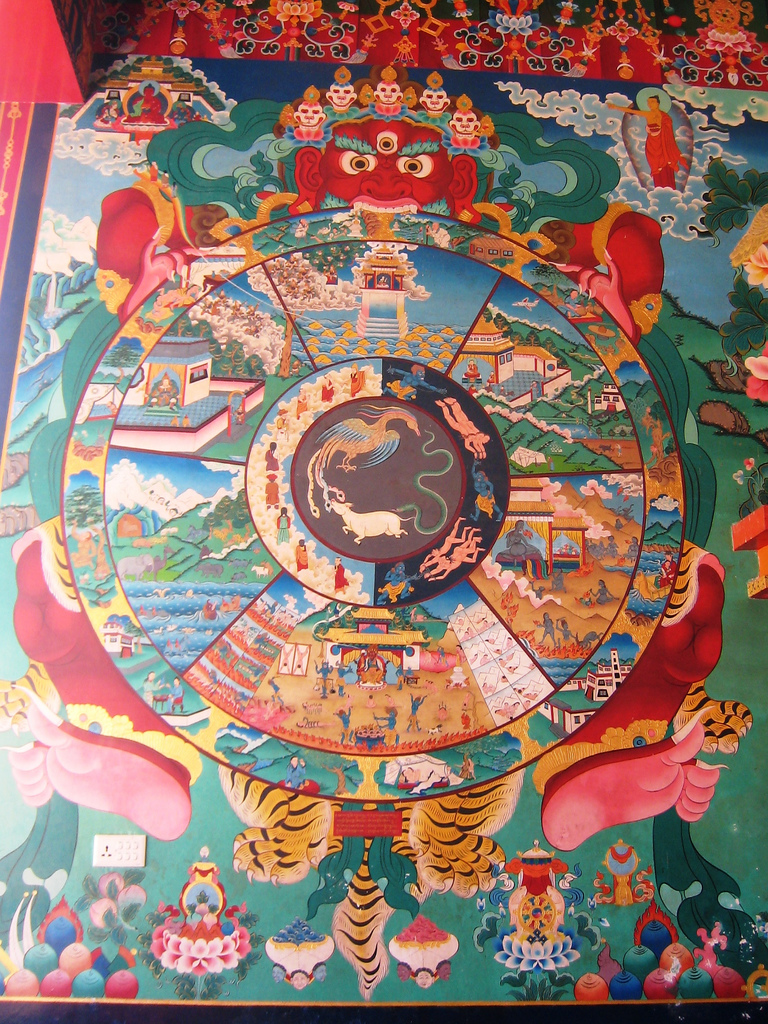
Left:Buddhist art shop in Kathmandu near the stupa. Right: Buddhist artwork, a thangka at Kopan Monastery

Kathmandu is a center for art in Nepal, displaying the work of contemporary artists in the country and also collections of historical artists. Patan is particular is an ancient city noted for its fine arts and crafts. Art in Kathmandu is vibrant, demonstrating a fusion of traditionalism and modern art, derived from a great number of national, Asian and global influences. Nepalese art though is commonly divided into two areas, the idealistic traditional painting known as Paubhas in Nepal and perhaps more commonly known as Thangkas in Tibetan, which are usually highly colorful and bold and closely linked to the country's religious history and then the contemporary western style painting, including nature based compositions or abstract artwork based on Tantric elements and social themes of which painters in Nepal are well noted for. Internationally, the British-based charity, the Kathmandu Contemporary Art Centre is involved with protecting arts in Kathmandu.

Kathmandu contains many notable art galleries. The NAFA Gallery, operated by the Arts and crafts Department of the Royal Nepal Academy is housed in Sita Bhavan, a neo- classical old Rana palace, divided into two galleries, the permanent Birendra Art Gallery which displays works of successful contemporary painters and sculptors. and a temporary gallery featuring artwork of up and coming Nepalese artists of the country.

The Srijana Contemporary Art Gallery, located inside the Bhrikutimandap Exhibition grounds, hosts the work of contemporary painters and sculptors, and regularly organizes exhibitions, both solo and group shows. It also runs morning and evening classes in the various schools of art. Also of note is the Moti Azima Gallery, located in a three storied building in Bhimsenthan which contains an impressive collection of traditional utensils and handmade dolls and items typical of a medieval Newar house, giving an important insight into Nepalese history. The J Art Gallery is also located in Kathmandu, near the Royal Palace in Durbarmarg, Kathmandu and displays the artwork of eminent, established Nepalese painters and the Nepal Art Council Gallery, which is located in the Babar Mahal, on the way to Tribhuvan International Airport which contains artwork of both national and international artists and contains extensive halls regularly used for art exhibitions.

=== Literature ===
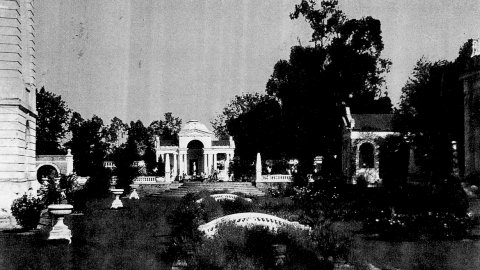
Kaiser Mahal library

The National Library of Nepal, is located in Patan, the largest in country with in excess of more than 70,000 books, mostly in English, but also with many in Nepali, Sanskrit, Hindi and Nepal Bhasa. The library is in possession of rare scholarly books in Sanskrit and English dating from the 17th century AD. Kathmandu contains the Kaiser Library, located in the Kaiser Mahal on the ground floor of Ministry of Education building. The collection which totals around 45,000 books, is derived from a personal collection of the Field Marshal Kaiser Shumsher Rana. It covers a wide range of subjects including history, law, art, religion, philosophy etc. and a Sanskrit manual of 'Tantra', believed to be over 1000 years old.

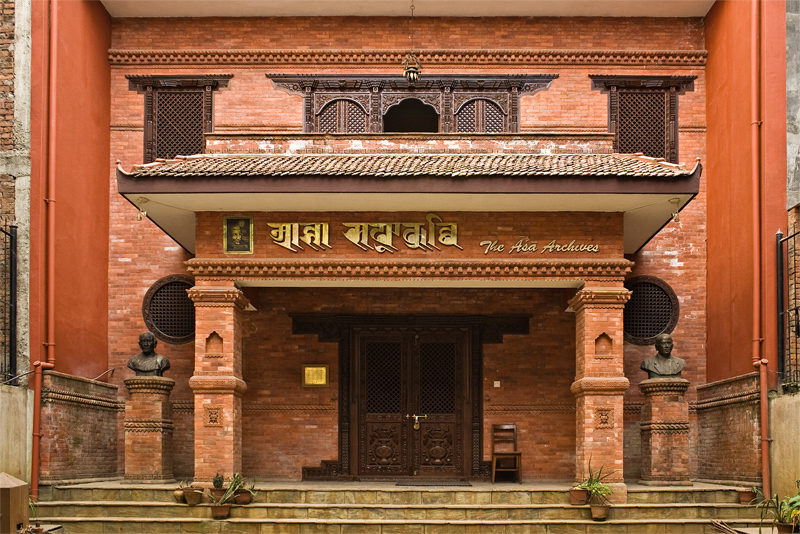
Asa Archives exterior

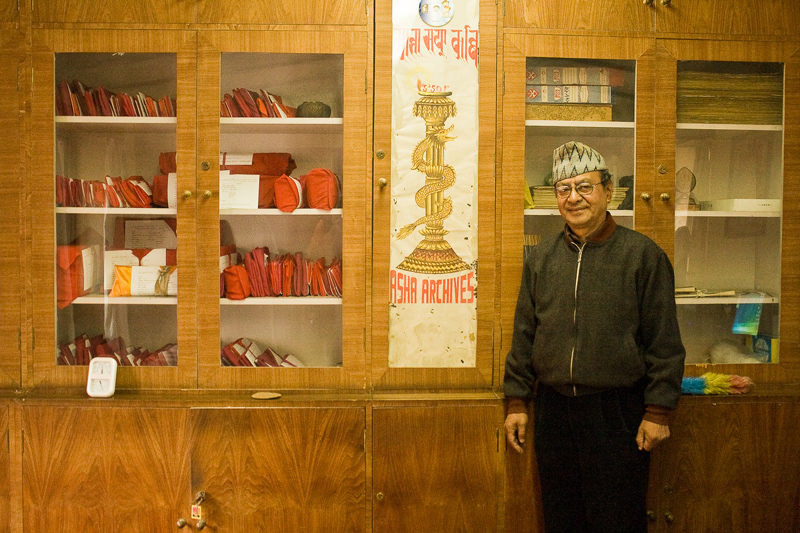
Asa Archives collection

The Asa Archives are also of major note and specialise in medieval history and religious traditions of the Kathmandu Valley. The archives are located in Kulumbbhula, and have a valuable collection of some 6,000 loose-leaf handwritten books and 1000 palm- leaf manuscripts, mostly in Sanskrit or Nepal Bhasa and a manuscript dated to 1464.

=== Theatre and cinema ===
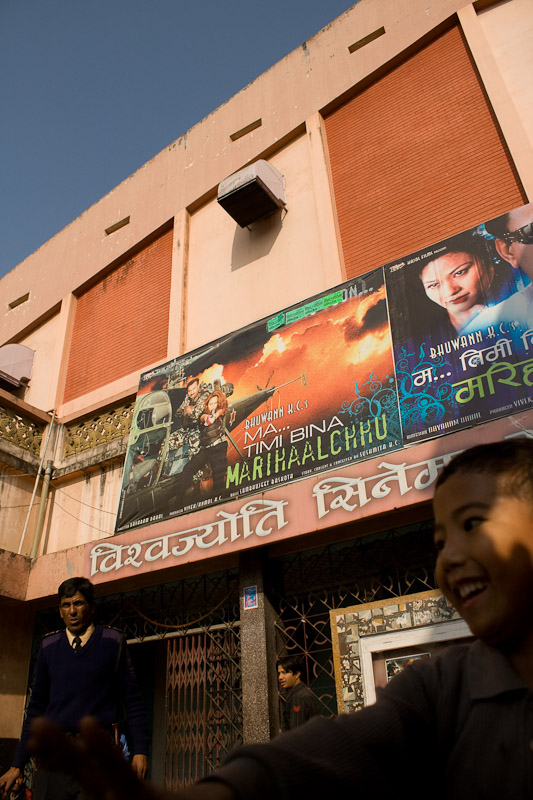
A cinema in Kathmandu

Kathmandu is home to the Nepalese theatre. The city contains several theatres of note including the National Dance Theatre in Kanti Path, the Ganga Theatre, The Himalayan Theatre and the Aarohan Theatre Group, founded in 1982 and the M. Art Theatre is based in the city. The Gurukul: School of Theatre organizes the Kathmandu International Theatre Festival, attracting artists from all over the world. A mini theatre is also located at the Hanumandhoka Durbar Square, established by the Durbar Conservation and Promotion Committee.

Kathmandu is also the centre of the Nepalese film industry and for production. Kathmandu has a number of cinemas showing Nepali, Indian and western films including the Biswajyoti Cinema Hall, Ranjana Cinema Hall, Kumari Cinema Hall, Jai Nepal Cinema Hall, Tara Cinema Hall, Gopi Krishna Cinema Hall and the Kalanki Cinema Hall.

=== Music ===
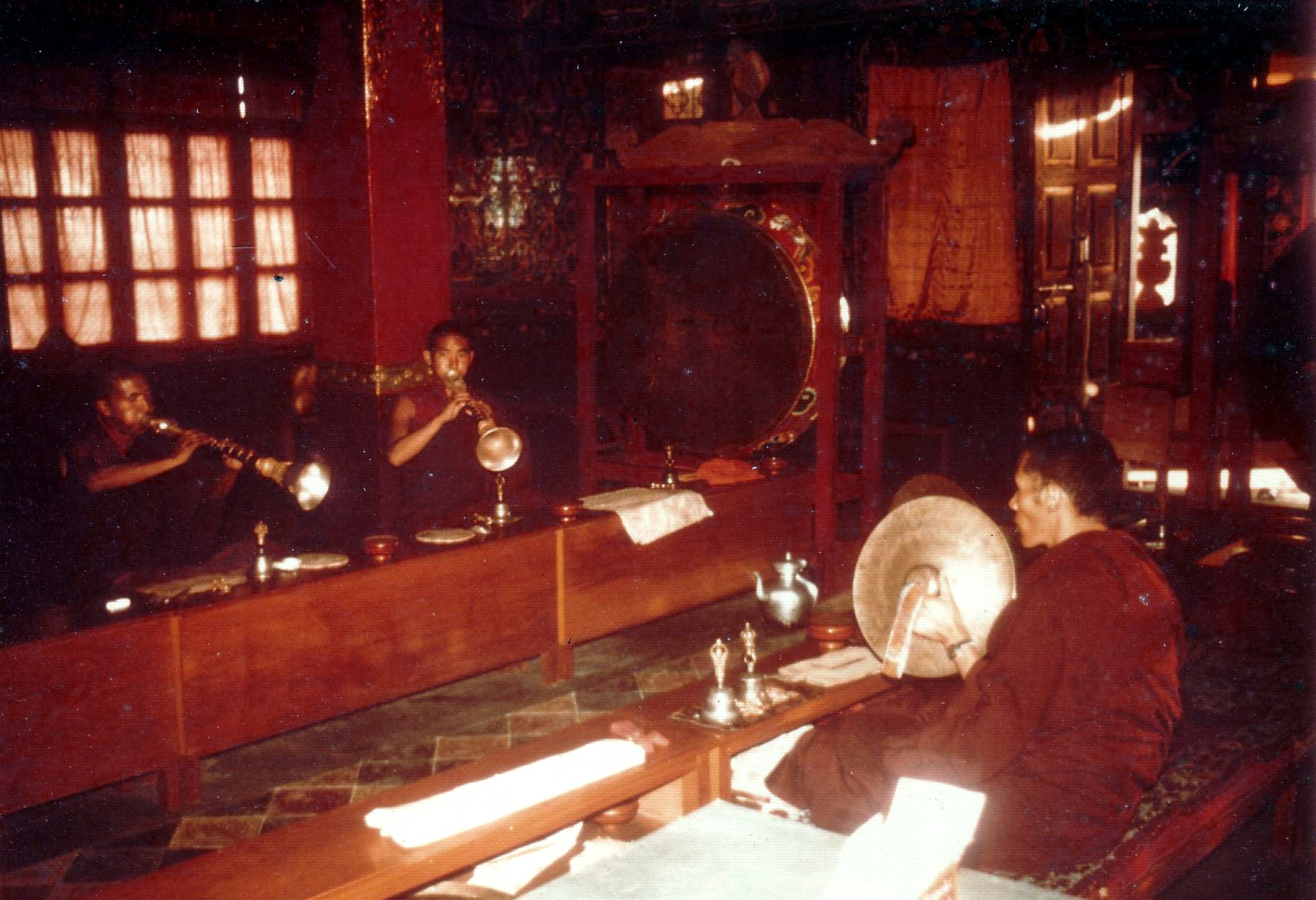
Tibetan monks performing music in the Boudhanath.

Kathmandu is the centre of music and dance in Nepal and is integral to understanding the city. Various musical performances are organized in the cultural venues (Visit: Atul Gautam Memorial Gurukul, Kirateshwor, Kapan Music Center) of the city throughout the year. The city contains prestigious musical training schools such as the Atul Gautam Memorial Gurukul, Kirateshwor, Kapan Music Center, Asian Himalayan Music School. Many musical bands like Sursudha, Sukarma, Sampada Band (The heritage band), Trikaal etc. are famous in Nepal. There are various music venues and musical performances may include the Bhanchha Ghar in Kamaladi, Bhojan Griha in Dillibazar and the Nepali Chulo in Durbar Marg. Given the importance of Kathmandu to Tibetan Buddhists, the city also attracts monks from Tibet and across the Himalayan region who in coordination with their rituals in visiting sites such as the Boudhanath, will perform music there.

Kathmandu is noted internationally for its jazz festival, popularly known as Jazzmandu. It is the only jazz festival in the entire Himalayan region and was established in March 2002. The festival attracts musicians from countries worldwide such as Australia, Denmark, United States, Benin, and India.

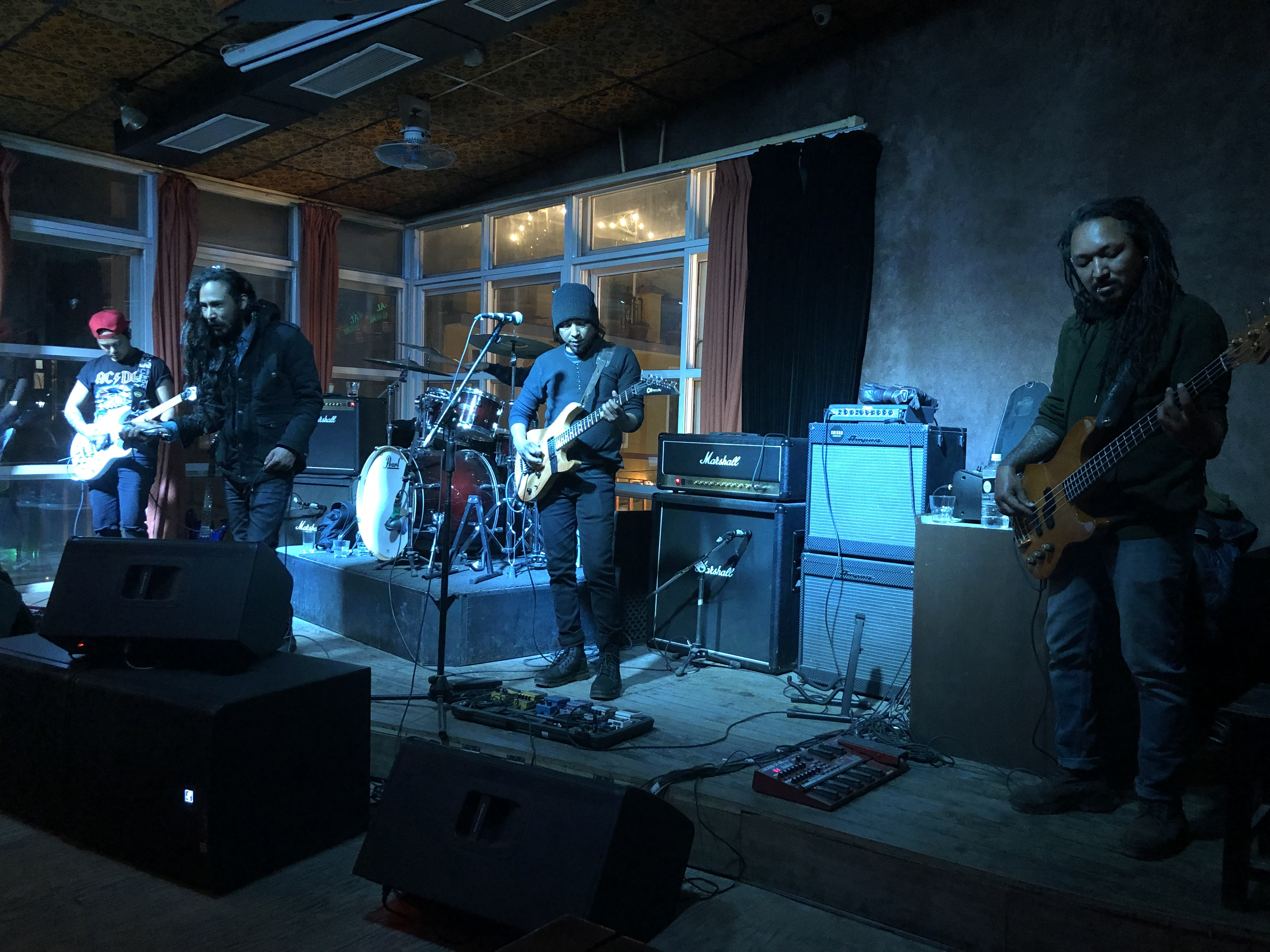
A rock band playing in Kathmandu

The city has been referenced in numerous songs, including works by Cat Stevens "Katmandu", Mona Bone Jakon (1970), Bruce Cockburn ("Tibetan Side of Town", Big Circumstance, 1988), Bob Seger ("Katmandu", Beautiful Loser (1975)), Rush ("A Passage to Bangkok" ("Pulling into Kathmandu"), 2112, 1976), Krematorij ("Kathmandu", Three Springs (2000)), Fito Páez ("Tráfico por Katmandú" – "Traffic through Kathmandu"); Will Ackerman ("A Happy Home in Kathmandu", The Opening of Doors (1993)); Tantra ("The Hills of Katmandu", early 1980s); Ok Go "Back From Kathmandu" (Of the Blue Colour of the Sky (2010)); and Godiego ("Coming Together in Kathmandu", 1980).

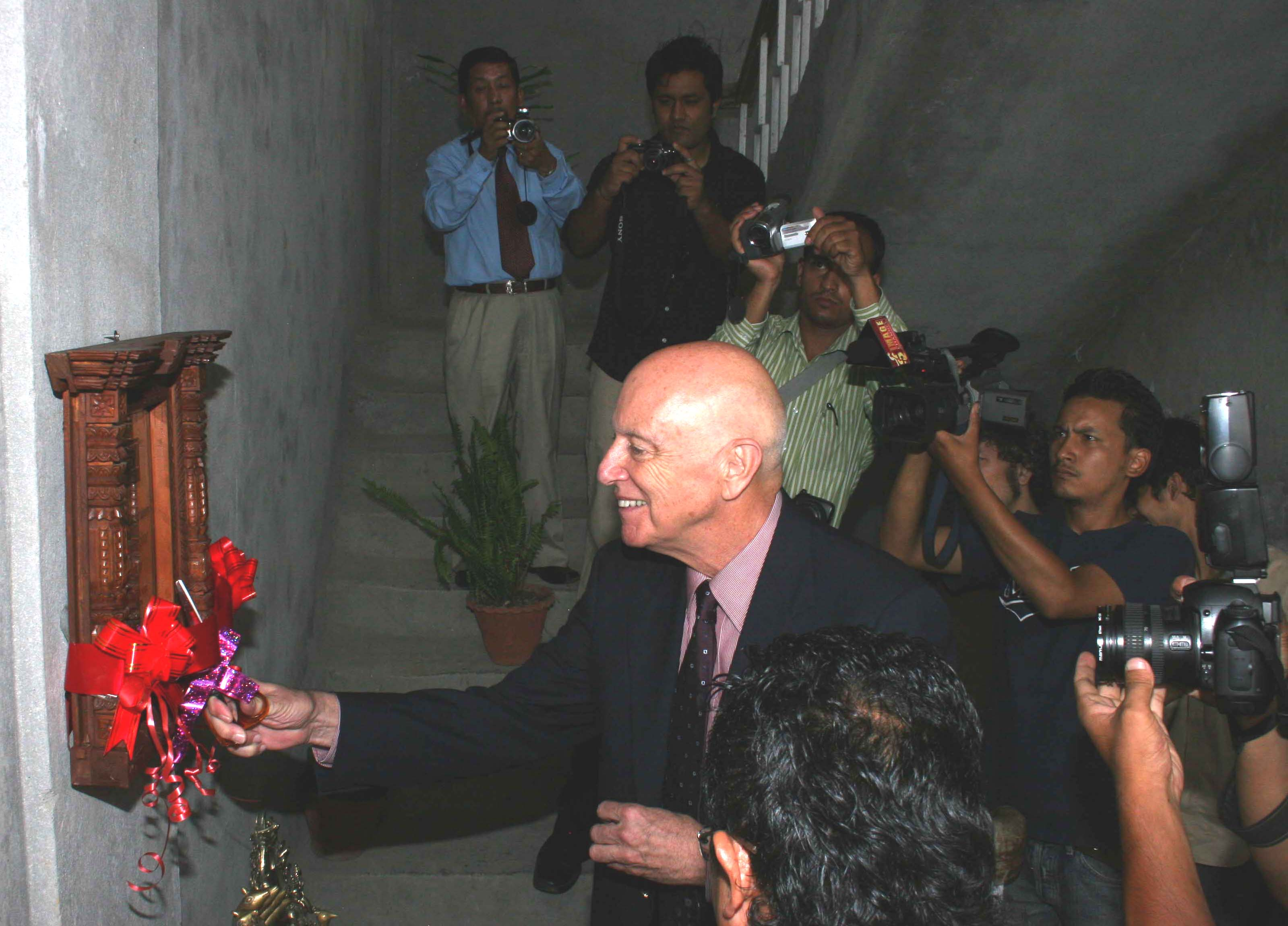
US Cultural Envoy Gene Aitken opening the Kathmandu Jazz Conservatory in Nepal in 2008

On June 9, 2008, US Cultural Envoy Gene Aitken inaugurated the Kathmandu Jazz Conservatory (KJC) in nearby Lalitpur. A 10-day workshop for over 50 music teachers and Nepali jazz educators was initially held. The mandate of the Conservatory is to create a musical environment where musicians can become knowledgeable in various musical subjects, be exposed to different music genres, and most importantly, where all musicians, from beginners to advanced, can receive a proper music education. Investment in the school has been substantial. Facilities include a music hall which can seat 200 people, a music library, a listening lab, five practice rooms, two large rooms for ensemble rehearsal and group classes, separate rooms for both drum kit and percussion instruments, a piano practice room and a recording studio.

=== Cuisine ===
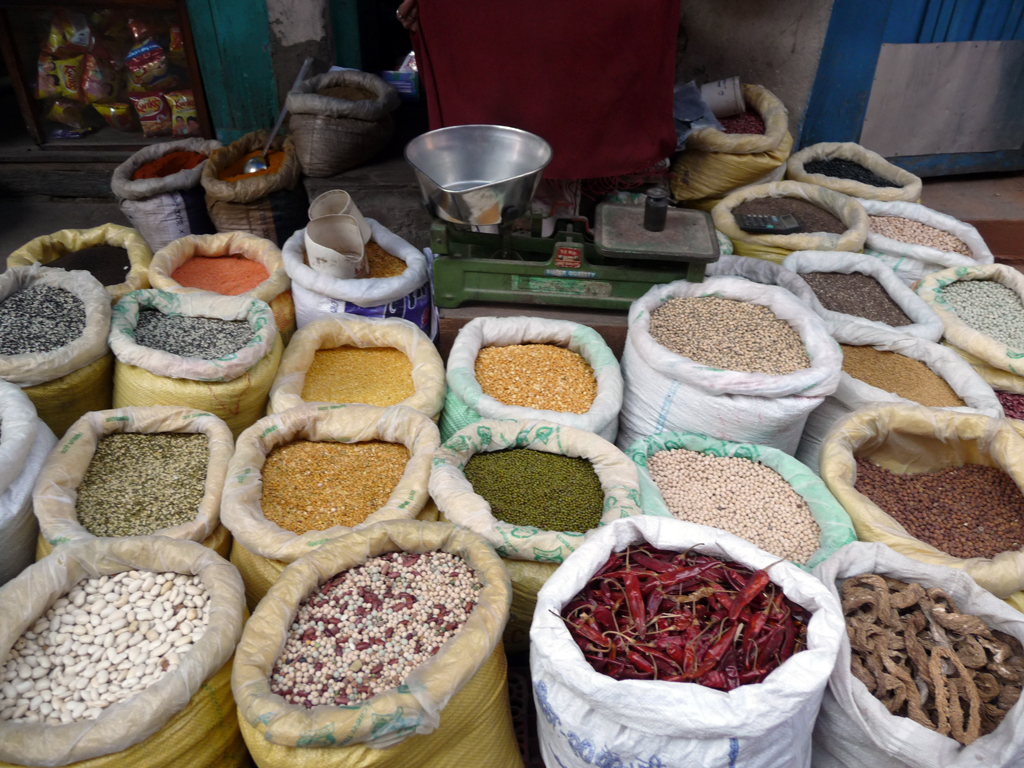
Assortment of beans, Durbar Square

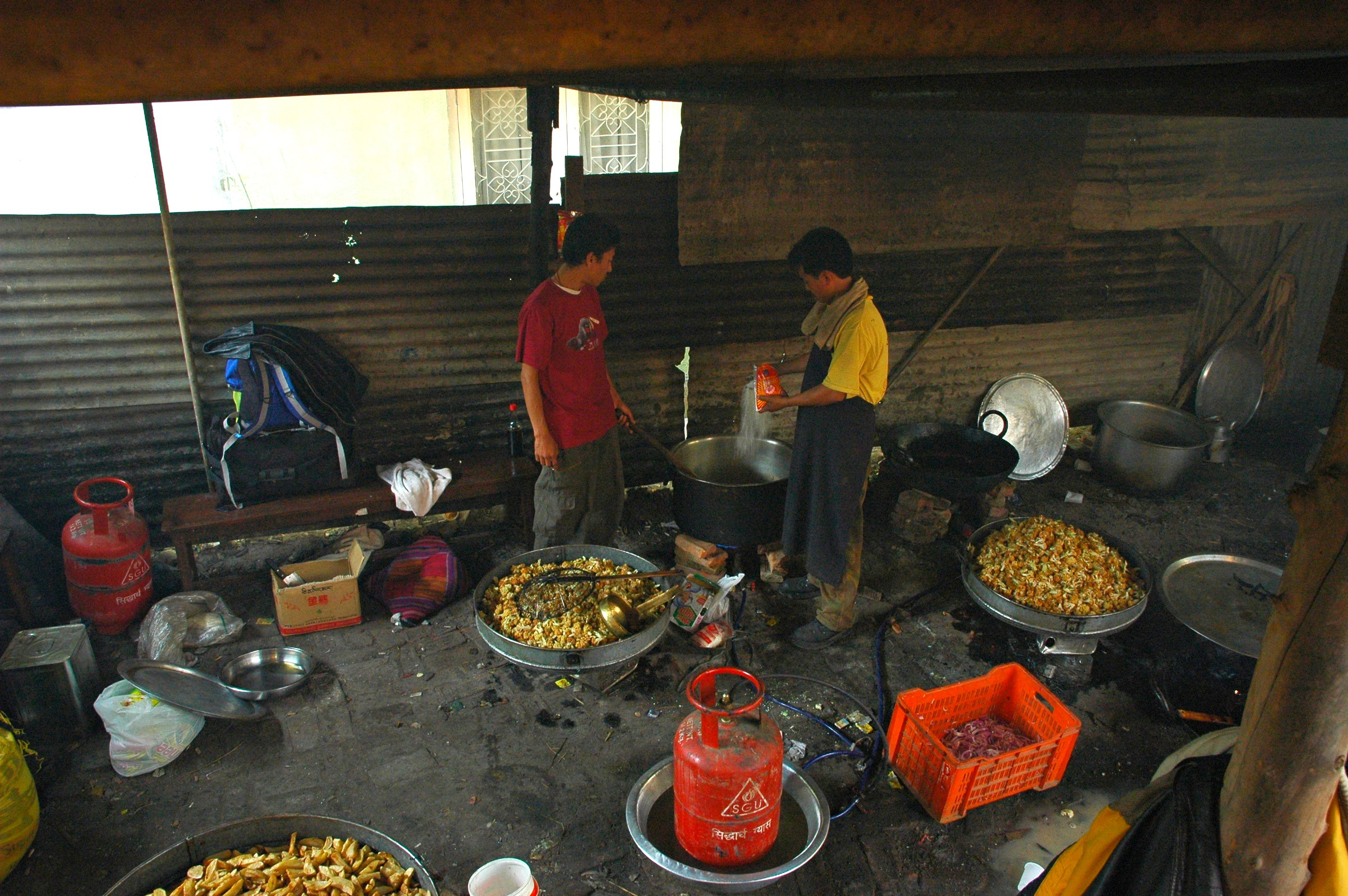
Cooking at Tharlam Monastery

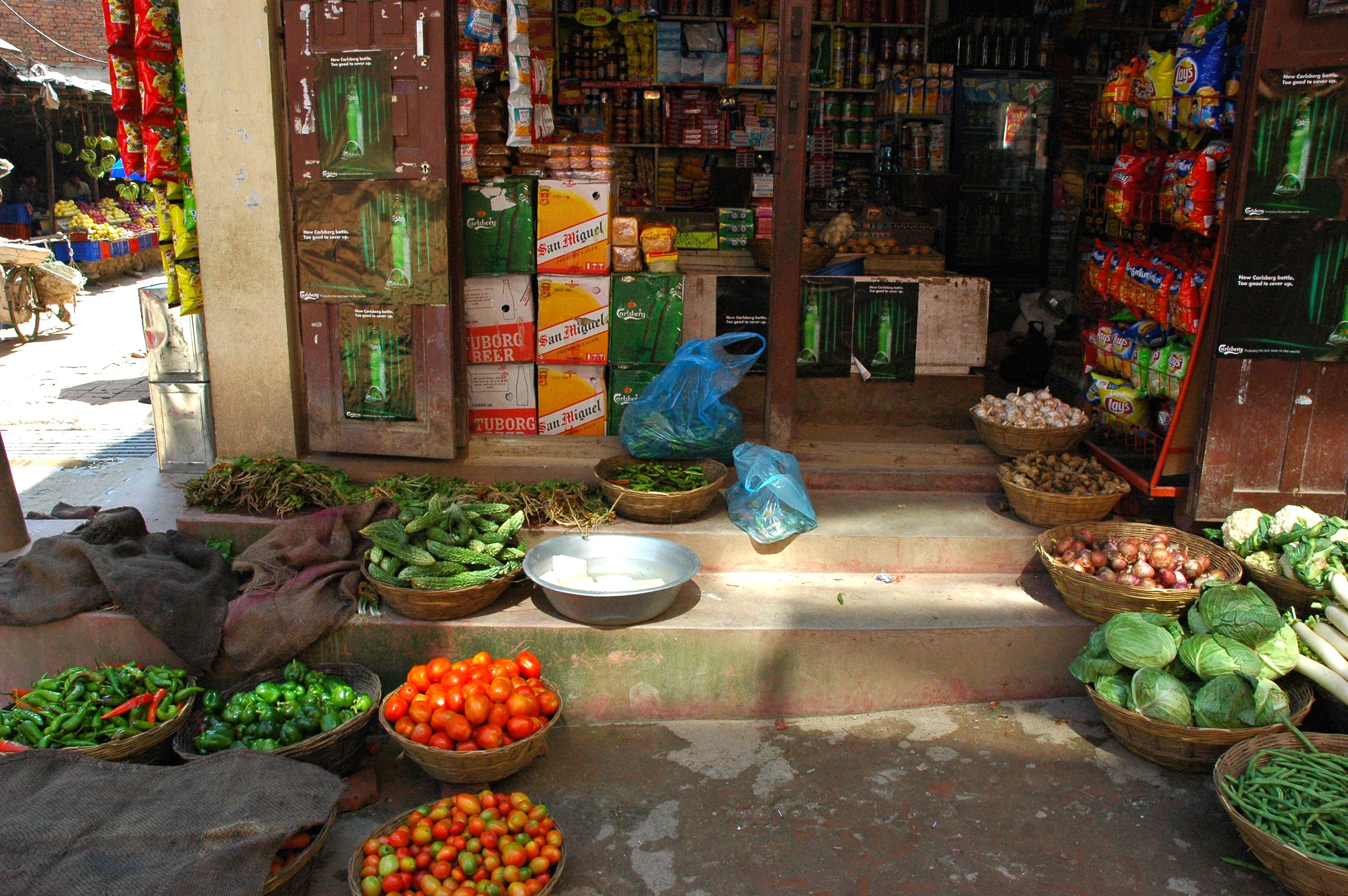
Grocery store selling vegetables and imported goods

The cultural diversity of Nepal has facilitated the growth of a number of cuisines based on the ethnic groups and the geographical features of the nation. Popularly served though is Dal bhat, which is a dish of lentils and rice, generally served with vegetable curries and forms a staple part of the diet. Given that Kathmandu only had one restaurant in 1955, a large number of restaurants in Kathmandu have since grown up catering in Nepalese cuisine, Tibetan cuisine and Indian cuisine in particular and many others to accommodate both for Nepalese people and for tourists from all around the world. The growth of tourism in Kathmandu has led to culinary creativity and the development of hybrid foods to accommodate for tourists such as American chop suey, which is a sweet and sour sauce with crispy noodles, with a fried egg commonly added on top and other westernized adaptions of traditional cuisine. Kathmandu is particularly famous for "Mo: mo:". Mo: mo: or म:म: is a type of dumpling that originated from Tibet. Many street vendors sell mo: mo:. It is one of the most popular fast foods in Kathmandu.

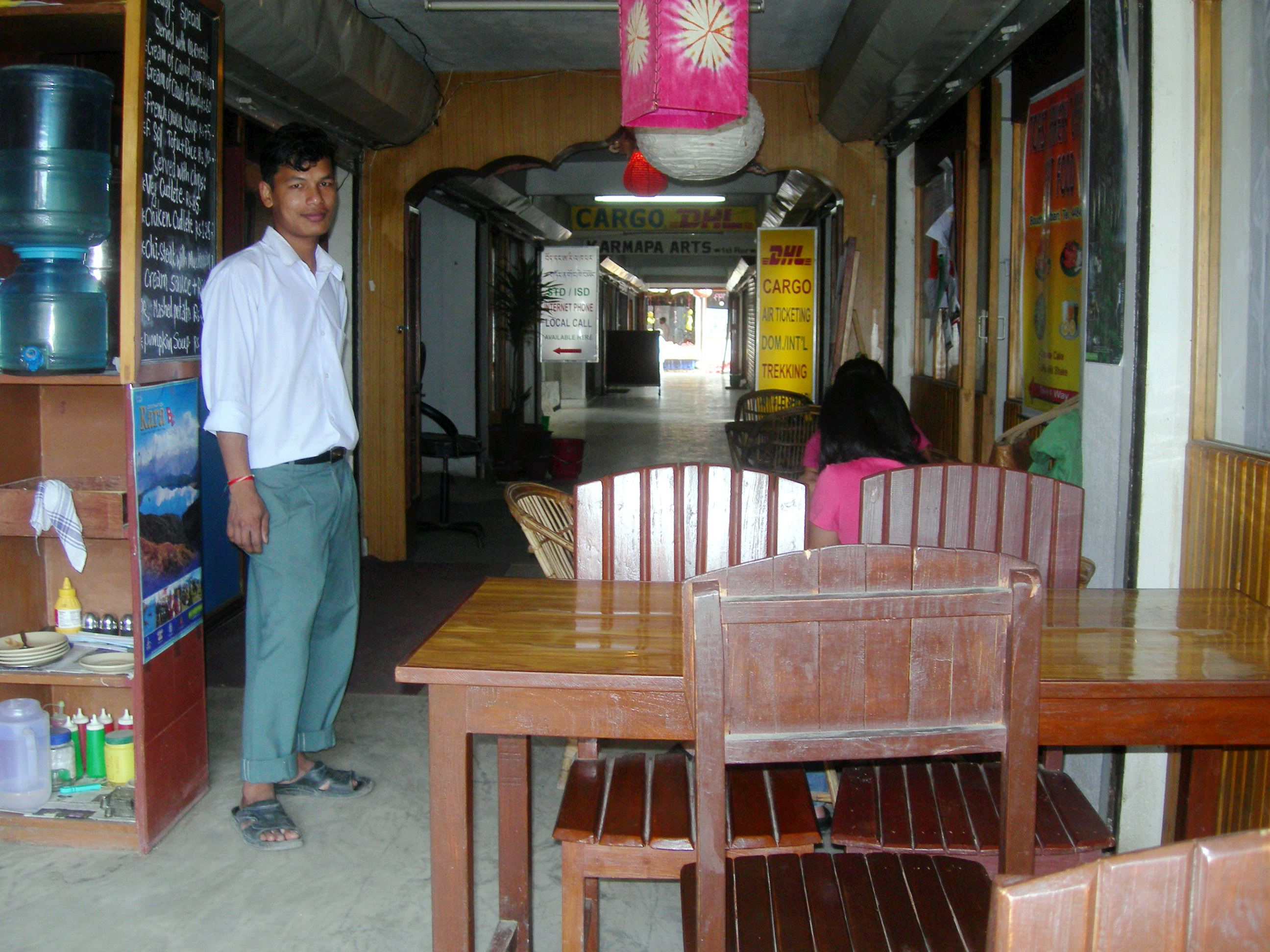
The Toast Bakery, Kathmandu

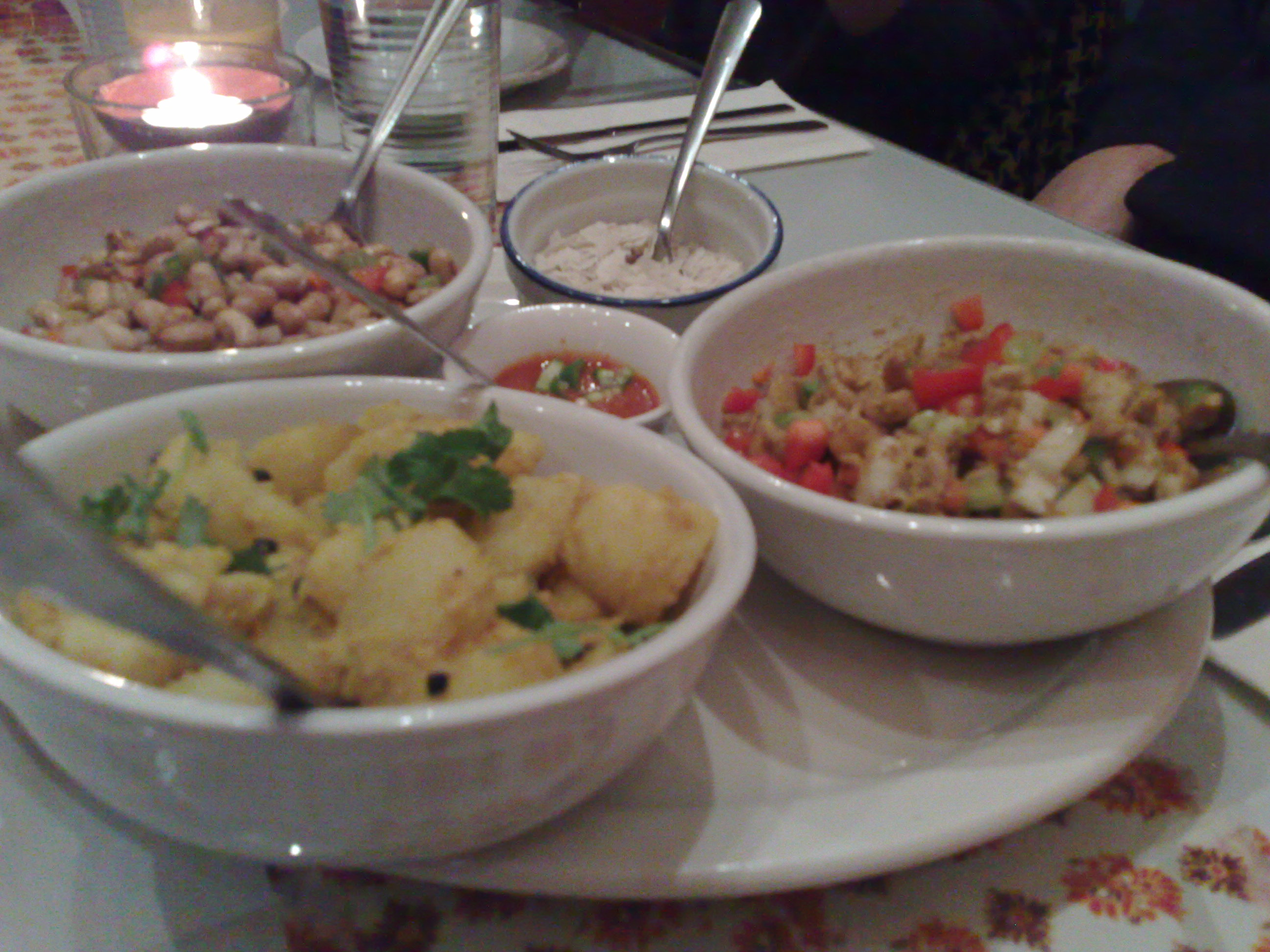
Kathmandu cuisine

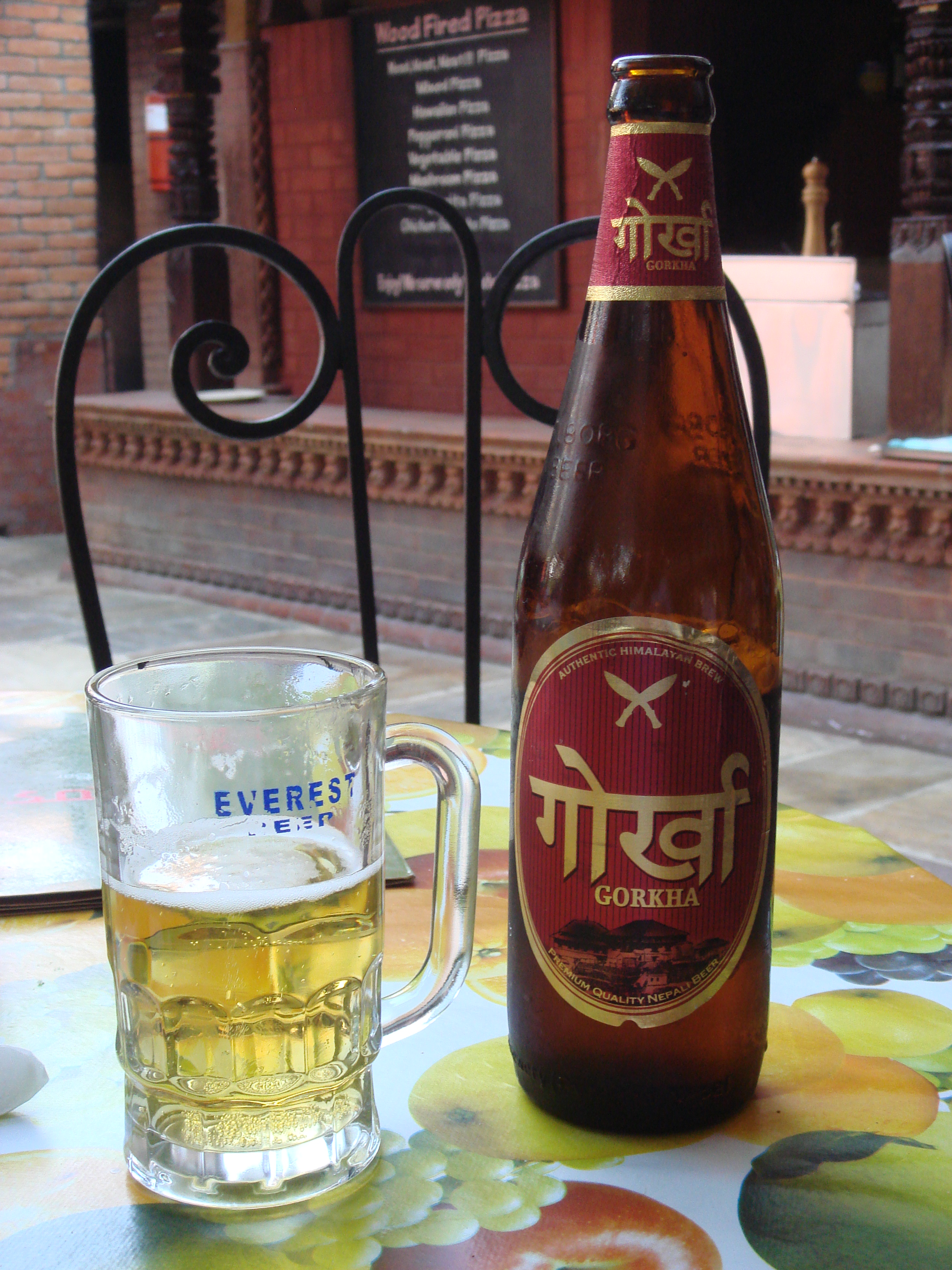
Gorkha beer

The national drink of Nepal is tea, widely served in Kathmandu, but is served extremely weak by western standards. Chiya, however, is richer and contains tea leaves boiled with milk, sugar and spices and the drink lassis, made of curds and sugar is also served in cafes and restaurants. Nepalese beer is available in such venues and in markets, including the national Gorkha beer brand. The popular Himalayan drinks of Chhaang and Tongba, typically made from fermented millet or barley and also sold, as are the harder spirit drinks of arak, made from fermented potatoes and rice. and rakshi, a modern type of Newari wine. Shops and bars in Kathmandu do, however, widely sell western and Indian beers, although shops are forbidden to sell alcohol on the first two days and last two days of the Newari month.

Fresh vegetables and fruit are widely sold in Kathmandu, particularly around the Durbar. The assortment of produce is diverse, and some sellers may specialise in the sale of different forms of specific vegetables, such as beans, for instance. Western convenience foods are sold in abundance in most of the shops, including Carlsberg beer, Coca-Cola and various potato snacks and candy.

=== Festivals ===
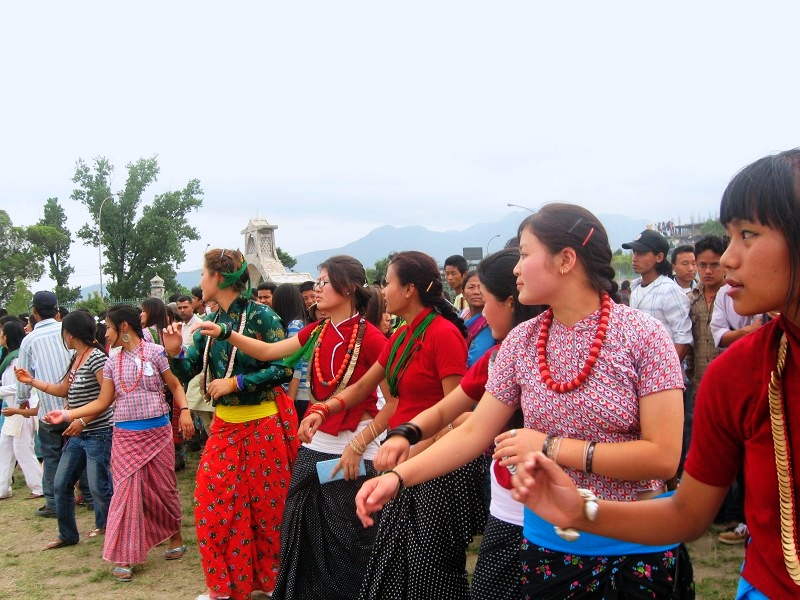
Festive dance of Kiratis, an ancient ethnic group of Nepal

Most of the fairs and festivals that are observed in Kathmandu have their origin to the Malla period. This was further given an urban cultural touch, not limiting it to the Newari festivities, subsequent to the Gorkha conquest in 1768–69. The culture of Parbatiyas and new migrant communities were also harmoniously amalgamated. The festivities such as the Ghode (horse) jatra, Indra-Jatra, Dasai Durga Puja festivals, Shivratri and many more are observed by all Hindu and Buddhist communities of Kathmandu with great devotional fervour and enthusiasm. Social regulation in the codes enacted incorporated the Hindu religious traditions and ethics. These were followed by the Shah Kings as had been followed by previous kings, as devout Hindus and protectors of Buddhist religion. Christian proselytizing was not allowed by the Shahs though Christian missionaries did try to spread the message of Christ in the Himalayan kingdom.

Cultural continuity has been maintained for centuries – from ancient to modern period – in the exclusive worship of goddesses and deities such as the Ajima, Taleju (or Tulja Bhavani), Degutaleju, Kumari (the living goddess) and so forth in Kathmandu and the rest of the country.

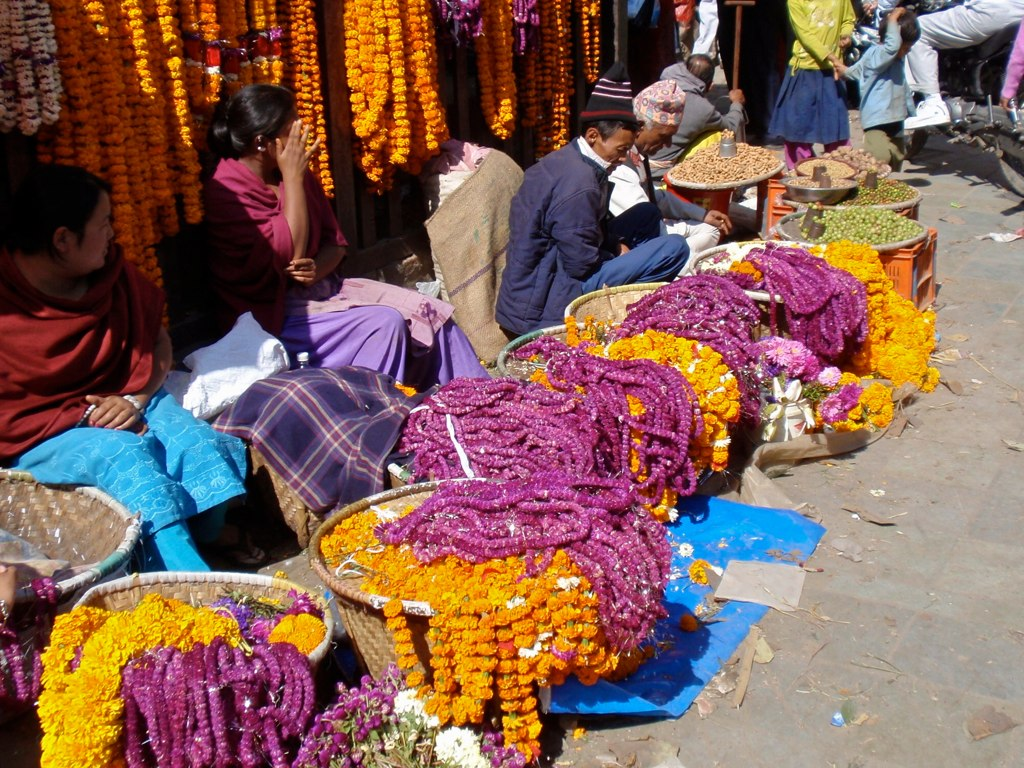
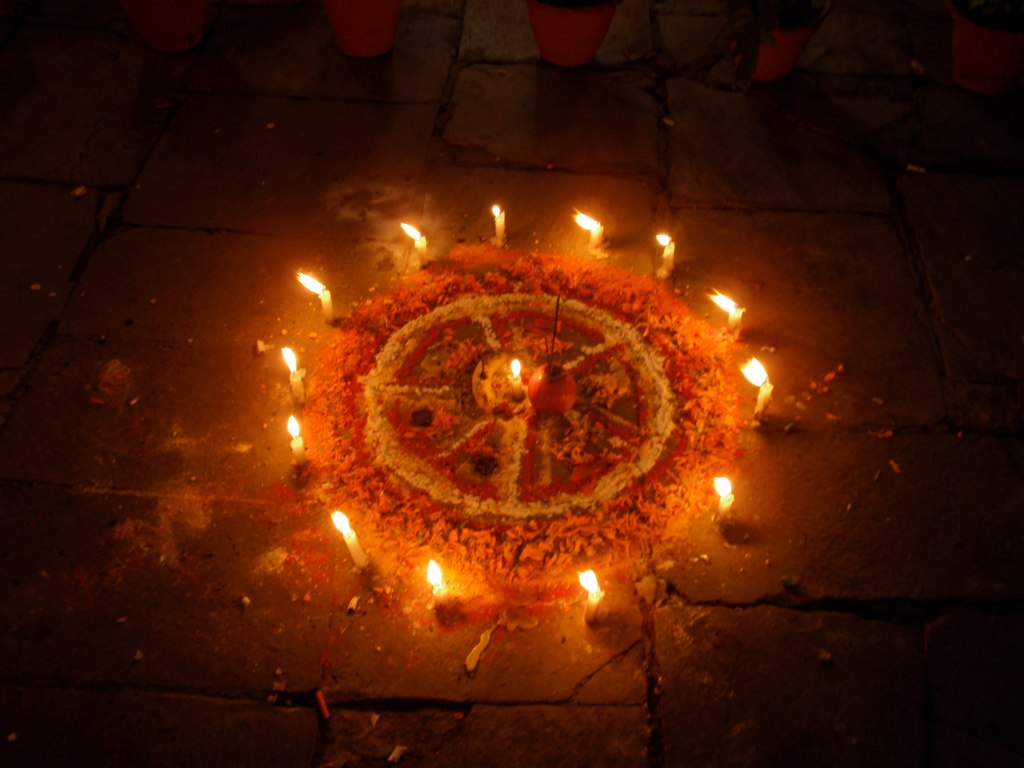
Tihar Festival.

The artistic edifices have now become places of worship in the everyday life of the people, and thus a roster is maintained to observe the annual festivals, which is intimately linked with the daily life of the people. It is said that there are 133 festivals held in year.

Some of the traditional festivals observed in Kathmandu now are: Bada Dashain, Mohani, Tihar, Swanti, Chhath, Maghe Sankranti, Naga Panchami, Janai Poornima, Pancha Dan, Teej/Rishi Panchami, Indra Jatra Yenya, Ghanta Karna, Buddha Jayanti, Sri Panchami, Maha Shivaratri, Phagu Poornima, Pahan Charhe, Ghodejatra, Chaite Dashain, Nava Varsha, Jana Baha Dyah Jatra and Matatirtha Aunsi, apart from those mentioned earlier.
