= KJC =

KJC, or kjc, may refer to:

- Kilgore College, also called Kilgore Junior College
- the ISO 639-3 language code for Coastal Konjo
- the Library of Congress Classification code for "regional and comparative law"
- the ICAO airline designator for KrasAir
- the Kramer Junction Company, a solar power production company in California, USA
- the King James Clarified version of the Bible
- Kathmandu Jazz Conservatory
- Kingdom of Jesus Christ (church)
- KJC Games
