= A Dream Like Mine =

Single by Bruce Cockburn

from the album Nothing but a Burning Light
- Written: August 17, 1990
- Released: October 1991
- Recorded: May – July 1991
- Studio: Scream Studios, Los Angeles
- Length: 3:53
- Label: True North (Canada); Columbia Records (US and Europe)
- Songwriter: Bruce Cockburn
- Producer: T Bone Burnett

Bruce Cockburn singles chronology
"Shipwrecked at the Stable Door" (1989)	"A Dream Like Mine" (1991)	"Great Big Love" (1992)

"A Dream Like Mine" is a song by the Canadian singer-songwriter Bruce Cockburn. Written in Dawson City within the Yukon territory, Cockburn based "A Dream Like Mine" on M. T. Kelly's book of the same name. The song was released as the lead single from the album, where it reached No. 16 on the RPM Canadian singles chart, becoming his second-highest charting song there after "If a Tree Falls". It also peaked at No. 22 on the US Modern Rock chart and also became Cockburn's only charting song in Germany.

== Background ==
Along with "Kit Carson and "Indian Wars", "A Dream Like Mine" details matters related to the Indigenous peoples of the Americas. Cockburn took some inspiration from the novel A Dream Like Mine by M. T. Kelly, which follows a shaman who desires justice and restitution for indigenous peoples. Prior to reading the novel, Cockburn had familiarized himself with the plight of indigenous peoples in Canada, where he was affected by the impact Canadian Indian residential schools had on the population. Through his interactions with them, Cockburn also sensed the indigenous peoples of Canada had a great sense of pride in their identity, which he found to be "heartwarming". Cockburn originally intended for the song to be used for a film based on the novel, although the director was dissatisfied with the music and opted not to include it in the soundtrack.

Upon its release, "A Dream Like Mine" debuted at No. 61 on the RPM Hit Tracks chart in Canada during the week October 19, 1991, making it the highest entry of the week. A music video was also created for the song, which was directed by Alan Kelman and produced by Larry Jordan through KRT-Howlin Productions.

== Personnel ==
- Bruce Cockburn – electric guitar
- Larry Klein – bass
- Booker T. Jones – organ
- Denny Fongheiser – drums
- Michael Blair – percussion
- Ralph Forbes – percussion
- Sam Phillips – backing vocals

== Chart performance ==
Chart (1991–1992)	Peak position
Canada Top Singles (RPM)	16
Canada Adult Contemporary (RPM)	5
Germany (GfK)	87
US Alternative Airplay (Billboard)	22

=== Year-end charts ===
Chart (1991)	Position
Canadian Adult Contemporary(RPM)	72

Chart (1992)	Position
Canadian Adult Contemporary(RPM)	63
