= Jazzmandu =

Jazz festival in Nepal

- Genre: Jazz, Nepali jazz
- Dates: Around September–December
- Locations: Kathmandu, Nepal
- Years active: 2002–2024
- Website: https://jazzmandu.org/

The Kathmandu Jazz Festival or Jazzmandu is an annual jazz festival, organised by Upstairs Ideas in Kathmandu, Nepal. The festival's name is a portmanteau of jazz and Kathmandu.

== History ==
The first Jazzmandu was held in 2002 (24 years ago), building upon the success of the first 'Jazz at Patan' event the previous year. The festival's first edition included performances by the renowned Australian jazz and swing musician Don Burrows, UK singer Natalie Williams, and Australian Jazz/Funk outfit Afro Dizzi Act.

Jazzmandu headliners
2002 - Don Burrows(Australia), Afro Dizzi Act (Australia), Natalie Williams (UK)
2003 - Trilok Gurtu (India), Jesse van Ruller (Holland), Jamie Baum (USA)
2004 - Louis Banks (India), Urban Connection (Norway), Simak Dialog (Indonesia)
2005 - Solid (Norway), Soul Mate (India), Groove Suppa (India)
2006 - Latin Jazz Allstars (USA), Remi Abraham (France) Andy Gross Koph (Germany), Judy Lewis (Israel)
2008 - Catia Werneck (Brazil), Global Unity (India), Mark Brown Band (UK), Wanny Angerer (Honduras)
2009 - Trio Urbano (USA), Sheyla Costa (Brazil), Yuri Honing Trio (Holland), Vatapuj (Thailand)
2010 - Ari Hoenig (USA), BUG (USA), Saskri Pang Vongdharadhon (Thailand)
2011- Cuban League (USA), Neighbourhood (Sweden), bconnected (Switzerland)
2012 - Tito Puente Jr. (USA), Marlow Rosado (USA), Suzy &2 (Norway), Rootman (Thailand), NoJazz (France)
2014 - KJ Denhert (USA), Eduardo Mendonca (Brazil), Pity Cabrera Trio (France), Ange Takats (Australia), Kristian Persson Elements (Sweden)

It has featured such renowned artists as legendary Indian percussionist Trilok Gurtu, and American jazz drummer Ari Hoenig.

Jazzmandu 2007 was cancelled due to political unrest and civil conflict in Nepal.

== Jazz education in Nepal ==
Jazzmandu actively promotes music education in Nepal, organizing band competitions, workshops and master classes for young local musicians., and working closely with the Kathmandu Jazz Conservatory.

== Jazzmandu 2012 ==
Jazzmandu 2012 will run from November 1 to 7 and will feature American drummer Tito Puente, Jr., and Thai ensemble Rootman, among others.
