= Christmas (Bruce Cockburn album) =

Studio album by Bruce Cockburn
- Released: October 1993
- Recorded: May 1993
- Studios: Phase One Studios, Toronto
- Genres: Christmas, folk, pop
- Length: 57:22
- Label: True North
- Producer: Bruce Cockburn

Bruce Cockburn chronology
Nothing but a Burning Light (1991)	Christmas (1993)	Dart to the Heart (1994)

Professional ratings
Review scores
Source	Rating
AllMusic	3/5 stars

Christmas is the eighteenth full-length album by Canadian singer-songwriter Bruce Cockburn, released in 1993 by True North Records. The album has been certified 6x Platinum by Music Canada, denoting sales of over 600,000 units.

This was Cockburn's second studio album that he self-produced, with his first being Inner City Front from 1981. Cockburn explained that he produced Christmas himself because "there was nobody else to do it."

Cockburn explained to The Globe and Mail that he had intended on creating a Christmas album for several years due to his appreciation of the religious Christmas canon. Several of the songs were picked from a notebook of Christmas carols given to him by his father. He gravitated toward more traditional tunes, which included a cover of "Jesus Ahatonnia" in Huron.

== Track listing ==
All tracks traditional, arranged by Bruce Cockburn, except where noted.

1. "Adeste Fidelis" (John Francis Wade) – 0:52
2. "Early on One Christmas Morn" (Traditional) – 3:02
3. "O Little Town of Bethlehem" (Phillips Brooks, Lewis Redner) – 3:38
4. "Riu Riu Chiu" (Traditional) – 6:26
5. "I Saw Three Ships" (Traditional) – 4:19
6. "Down in Yon Forest" (Traditional) – 4:09
7. "Les Anges Dans Nos Campagnes" (Traditional) – 3:09
8. "Go Tell It on the Mountain" (Traditional) – 3:12
9. "Shepherds" (Bruce Cockburn) – 2:52
10. "Silent Night" (Franz Gruber, Joseph Mohr) – 4:10
11. "Jesus Ahatonnia (The Huron Carol)" – 6:33
12. "God Rest Ye Merry, Gentlemen" – 2:53
13. "It Came Upon the Midnight Clear" – (Edmund Sears, Richard Storrs Willis, arr. Sam Phillips) – 6:41
14. "Mary Had a Baby" (Traditional) – 4:42
15. "Joy to the World" (Lowell Mason) – 0:44

== Album credits ==
Musicians

- Bruce Cockburn – vocals, guitar, percussion (tracks 4, 7, 14), dulcimer (tracks 4, 6, 7), harmonica (tracks 5, 7), wind chimes (track 6)
- Gary Craig – drums (tracks 2, 5, 8, 9, 10, 11), percussion (track 14), backing vocals (track 14)
- Colin Linden – guitar (track 2, 9), slide guitar (tracks 5, 8, 10), electric guitar (track 11), backing vocals (track 2)
- Richard Bell – piano (track 2), organ (tracks 5, 6, 8, 9, 10, 11, 13), accordion (tracks 7, 14), backing vocals (track 14)
- Dick Smith – percussion (tracks 2, 4, 6, 7, 11, 13, 14), backing vocals (track 14)
- Hugh Marsh – violin (tracks 4, 5, 6, 10, 11, 13)
- John Dymond – bass (tracks 5, 8, 9, 10, 11, 14), backing vocals (track 14)
- Colina Phillips – backing vocals (tracks 2, 8, 10)
- Sharon Lee Williams – backing vocals (tracks 2, 8, 10)
- Vivienne Williams – backing vocals (tracks 2, 8, 10)
- Alberto Mirabal – backing vocals (tracks 4, 7)
- Candi Sosa – backing vocals (tracks 4, 7)
- Eliseo Borrero – backing vocals (tracks 4, 7)
- Sam Phillips – backing vocals (tracks 9, 13)
- T-Bone Burnett – humming (track 5)
- Jenny Cockburn – backing vocals (track 7)

Production

- Bruce Cockburn – producer
- Joe Schiff – recording, mixing
- Eric Ratz – assistant engineer
- Mike Piersante – assistant engineer
- Greg Calbi – mastering
- Christopher Austopchuk, Sara Rotman – art direction
- David Katzenstein – photography

== Certifications ==
Certifications and sales for Christmas
Region	Certification	Certified units/sales
Canada (Music Canada)	6× Platinum	600,000^{^}
^{*} Sales figures based on certification alone.^{^} Shipments figures based on certification alone.
