= Nothing but a Burning Light =

Studio album by Bruce Cockburn
- Released: 1991
- Recorded: May – July 1991
- Studios: Ocean Way, Hollywood; Scream, Los Angeles
- Genres: Folk; pop; roots rock
- Length: 59:59
- Label: True North
- Producer: T Bone Burnett

Bruce Cockburn chronology
Big Circumstance (1988)	Nothing but a Burning Light (1991)	Christmas (1993)

Nothing but a Burning Light is an album by Canadian singer/songwriter Bruce Cockburn. Released in 1991, it was his first album released by Columbia Records in the United States. This marked the first album that Cockburn recorded outside of Toronto as well as his first that was produced by T Bone Burnett.

In Canada, True North Records handled the release of Nothing but a Burning Light like it had for all of Cockburn's previous albums. Nothing But a Burning Light spawned four singles that reached the Canadian RPM 100 Hit Tracks and Adult Contemporary charts. The album was certified Gold in Canada in 1992 for sales of 50,000 units. "A Dream Like Mine" was released as the album's first single.

By March 1994, Nothing but a Burning Light had sold at least 79,000 copies in the United States according to Soundscan. Bernie Finkelstein, the head of True North Records, reckoned that the album had achieved worldwide sales of 400,000 units.

== Background ==
After the conclusion of his tour promoting Big Circumstance, Cockburn forwent touring and opted to take time off. During this time, Cockburn began to assess his approach to songwriting, ultimately reaching the conclusion that his material of 1980s had morphed more into band-oriented compositions that deviated from his earlier work as a solo performer. He arrived at the conclusion that the compositions from that era were difficult to play with just an acoustic guitar and voice. To that end, Cockburn instead decided to "write tunes that people could sing, and lyrics that meant something to them."

On Christmas Eve in 1989, Cockburn wrote the song "Child of the Wind" while in Tucson, Arizona, which was the first song he composed in one-and-a-half years. He then spent some time in Canada writing additional material. Once Cockburn was ready to record new material, he relocated from Toronto to Los Angeles to meet up with T Bone Burnett, who served as the producer for Nothing but a Burning Light. This marked the first time that Cockburn had recorded an album outside of Toronto. Cockburn had been interested in recording in a different location for several years, but was unable to do so because of financial costs. His United States record deal with Columbia Records, which was negotiated by Bernie Finkelstein and Don Ienner for Columbia Records, provided Cockburn with a budget that allowed him to record an album outside of Canada.

The members of Cockburn's 1980s touring band, who at that point had worked with him for five years, had found different opportunities while Cockburn was taking a break from touring. Since these musicians were no longer available to record with him, Cockburn worked with people selected by Burnett that included Larry Klein, Jim Keltner, and Michael Been, among others.

When working on the material for Nothing but a Burning Light, Cockburn originally centered the songs around his guitars, vocals, and a programmed electronic drum track. These programmed drums would then be replaced with real drums, which Cockburn said resulted in an easier recording process. One of Cockburn's songs was written about Kit Carson, an individual that he had heard about a few years prior to the composition's completion. Cockburn wrote the song "Indian Wars" about the displacement of the Indigenous peoples of the Americas by white settlers.

Cockburn followed up the release of Nothing but a Burning Light with a tour, where he performed in nine different countries. On February 13, 1992, Cockburn played live on the Command Performance radio program, which was broadcast via satellite to 24 Canadian radio stations.

== Critical reception ==
Professional ratings
Review scores
Source	Rating
AllMusic	3/5 stars
Chicago Tribune	3.5/4 stars
The Encyclopedia of Popular Music	4/5 stars
Entertainment Weekly	B
MusicHound Rock: The Essential Album Guide	4/5 stars
The Rolling Stone Album Guide	4/5 stars

The New York Times called the album the finest of Cockburn's career, writing that he "has returned to a simpler, more reflective folk-rock mode." Billboard found the album to be "less angry, though no less passionate than on previous works". They described "Cry of a Tiny Babe" as a song that "eloquently" showcases Cockburn's Christian beliefs. Billboard also characterized the production as "stark and dark" on some of the album's songs, including "Kit Carson" and "Mighty Trucks of Midnight". Reviewing the album for Audio, Michael Tearson called it "one of the strongest collections of songs Cockburn has recorded—a mystery tour through a lot of places, some hopeful, some grim and bloody, some very private."

In a retrospective review, AllMusic critic Brett Hartenbach wrote of the album: "Throughout, Burnett's production is understated, allowing Cockburn's voice, guitar, and songs to lead the way over a solid foundation of bass, drums, and tasteful organ by Booker T. Jones. This sort of sympathetic production brings out the best in Cockburn and his material, which is consistently strong... Though it may lack the immediate power, Nothing but a Burning Light is Bruce Cockburn's best since his 1984 release Stealing Fire." Trouser Press wrote that the album "contains some of Cockburn's best loved songs ('A Dream Like Mine', 'Great Big Love') but falls a notch or two below great."

== Track listing ==
All songs written by Bruce Cockburn, except where noted.

1. "A Dream Like Mine" – 3:53
2. "Kit Carson" – 4:12
3. "Mighty Trucks of Midnight" – 5:57
4. "Soul of a Man" (Blind Willie Johnson, arr. Bruce Cockburn) – 3:52
5. "Great Big Love" – 5:13
6. "One of the Best Ones" – 6:57
7. "Somebody Touched Me" – 4:16
8. "Cry of a Tiny Babe" – 7:31
9. "Actions Speak Louder" – 3:01
10. "Indian Wars" – 6:58
11. "When It's Gone, It's Gone" – 4:19
12. "Child of the Wind" – 4:08

== Personnel ==
- Bruce Cockburn – electric guitar (tracks 1–3, 5, 7–9, 11), acoustic guitar (5, 6, 10), resonator guitar (tracks 4, 12) and vocals
- Booker T. Jones – organ (tracks 1–3, 6–9, 11, 12)
- Jim Keltner – drums (tracks 2, 3, 4, 6–8), percussion (track 2), washboard (track 4)
- Edgar Meyer – acoustic bass (tracks 2, 6, 7–9, 12), bass (track 11)
- Larry Klein – bass (tracks 1, 3, 5, 7, 9)
- Michael Been – bass (tracks 2, 4, 6, 8)
- Denny Fongheiser – drums (tracks 1, 5, 7, 9)
- Michael Blair – percussion (tracks 1, 5, 11), tambourine (track 7)
- Ralph Forbes – percussion (tracks 1, 5, 9, 11)
- Mark O'Connor – violin (tracks 6, 10–12)
- Sam Phillips – backing vocals (tracks 1, 5, 8)
- T Bone Burnett – electric guitar (track 5), acoustic guitar (track 7)
- Jackson Browne – backing vocals (tracks 5, 10), resonator guitar (track 10)

Production

- T Bone Burnett – producer
- Joe Henry – production assistant
- Pat McCarthy – engineer, mixer
- Dave Leonard – mixer (track 1)
- Paula "Max" Garcia – second engineer
- Chris Austopchuk – art direction
- Anton Corbijn – photography

== Chart performance ==
Chart (1991)	Peak position
Canada Top Albums/CDs (RPM)	30

== Certifications ==
Region	Certification	Certified units/sales
Canada (Music Canada)	Gold	50,000^{^}
^{*} Sales figures based on certification alone.^{^} Shipments figures based on certification alone.
