= Big Circumstance =

Studio album by Bruce Cockburn
- Released: 1989
- Recorded: 1988
- Genres: Folk, pop rock
- Length: 61:03
- Label: True North
- Producer: Jon Goldsmith

Bruce Cockburn chronology
World of Wonders (1986)	Big Circumstance (1989)	Nothing but a Burning Light (1991)

Big Circumstance is the sixteenth full-length album by Canadian singer/songwriter Bruce Cockburn. The album was released in January 1989 by True North Records, making it his first studio album in three years. Rounder Records issued a remastered CD of the album in 2005 with a new acoustic version of "If A Tree Falls" as a bonus track.

In Canada, the album peaked at No. 15. It also spawned "If A Tree Falls", which ascended to No. 8 on the singles chart, became Cockburn's only top ten hit in that country.

Within a few months of its release, Big Circumstances was certified gold in Canada.

== Critical reception ==
Professional ratings
Review scores
Source	Rating
AllMusic	3/5 stars
The Village Voice	B

In their review of Big Circumstances, RPM wrote that "Cockburn's material continues to reinforce his larger-than-life image as a political poet", adding that "Canadians are fortunate to have a recording artist who will 'lock-in' his career fighting for causes that affect so many but are recognized by so few."

Billboard said that Cockburn was "set to win a larger audience" with Big Circumstances and that the "metaphorical richness of his songs handsomely clothes his often-pointed messages", pointing to "If A Tree Falls" as an example. Cashbox believed that Big Circumstances contained some of Cockburn's "harshest social criticism to date", giving particular attention to his criticism of deforestation on "If A Tree Falls". Robert Christgau of The Village Voice believed that Big Circumstances continued the trend of increasingly bitter and indignant material from Cockburn, which he appreciated for its acerbic political commentary. Christgau lamented that Big Circumstances contained songs centered around personal reflections and wished for an album from Cockburn exclusively containing protest songs.

The European trade magazine Music & Media labeled Big Circumstances their album of the week in their March 18, 1989 edition of the publication, saying that it "immediately ranks itself among the best in the semi-acoustic singer/songwriter genre." They felt that the album marked "an overwhelming return to form" and was "entertaining and engaging."

In his retrospective review for AllMusic, critic Rob Caldwell wrote that the album "was a move away from the somewhat dated, overblown sound of his previous World of Wonders, toward a leaner, more guitar-dominated sound... he takes pains to differentiate himself from right-wing Christianity and express his different view of the faith."

== Track listing ==
All tracks are written by Bruce Cockburn.

No.	Title	Length
1.	"If a Tree Falls"	5:43
2.	"Shipwrecked at the Stable Door"	3:38
3.	"Gospel of Bondage"	5:45
4.	"Don't Feel Your Touch"	4:49
5.	"Tibetan Side of Town"	6:59
6.	"Understanding Nothin"	4:26
7.	"Where the Death Squad Lives"	4:28
8.	"Radium Rain"	9:22
9.	"Pangs of Love"	5:18
10.	"The Gift"	6:04
11.	"Anything Can Happen"	4:31

Remastered additional tracks
No.	Title	Length
12.	"If a Tree Falls (acoustic)"	5:24

== Personnel ==
- Bruce Cockburn – vocals, guitar, harmonica
- Fergus Jamison Marsh – bass, Chapman Stick
- Hugh Marsh – violin
- Jon Goldsmith – keyboards, autoharp
- Michael Sloski – drums, percussion
- Myron Schultz – clarinet
- Judy Cade – background vocals
- Mary Margaret O'Hara – background vocals
- Mose Scarlett – background vocals

Production

- Jon Goldsmith – producer
- George Whiteside – photography
- Bart Schoales – art direction

== Charts ==
=== Weekly charts ===
Chart (1989)	Peak position
Canada Top Albums (RPM)	15
US Billboard 200	182

=== Year-end charts ===
Chart (1989)	Position
Canada Top Albums/CDs (RPM)	64

== Certifications ==
Certifications and sales for Big Circumstance
Region	Certification	Certified units/sales
Canada (Music Canada)	Gold	50,000^{^}
^{*} Sales figures based on certification alone.^{^} Shipments figures based on certification alone.
