= If a Tree Falls (song) =

"If A Tree Falls"

Single by Bruce Cockburn

from the album Big Circumstance
- Written: April 7, 1988
- Released: 1989
- Recorded: July – August 1989
- Genre: Pop rock
- Length: 5:43
- Label: True North (Canada); Gold Castle Records (US); FM-Revolver Records (UK)
- Songwriter: Bruce Cockburn
- Producer: Jon Goldsmith

Bruce Cockburn singles chronology
"Burn" (1987)	"If A Tree Falls" (1989)	"Don't Feel Your Touch" (1989)

"If A Tree Falls" is a song by Canadian singer-songwriter Bruce Cockburn, from his 1989 album Big Circumstance. True North Records released the song in advance of True North Records in January 1989, where it entered the Canadian singles chart that same month. It later ascended to No. 8, becoming Cockburn's first and only top ten hit in his home country. The song also charted in the United States and Australia. "If A Tree Falls" touches upon environmental issues, particularly deforestation.

In 1990, "If a Tree Falls" was honored by SOCAN as one of the ten most popular Canadian songs of the previous year based on radio airplay, alongside songs by Ian Thomas, Alannah Myles, One to One, Frozen Ghost, Blue Rodeo, Candi, Glass Tiger, Indio, and Sheriff.

== Background ==
Cockburn wrote "If A Tree Falls" about worldwide deforestation. He mentioned that the song was primarily centered around tropical rainforest deforestation, but also found that the song applied to the loss of trees in boreal forests and temperate forests. He also mentioned that the song still carried salience in a 2010 interview with The Globe & Mail.

When I wrote that song they were cutting down the Amazon rainforest to put in cattle. But that didn't work out, and the next thing you know they're planting soybeans. But they're still cutting down the forests, and they're still displacing the natives. Corn for the biodiesel trade, that's the new big thing. You can't win. You create all this awareness about one aspect of the problem, but as soon as you think you have a foot on top of that, it squeezes out from under and morphs into something else.

In his 2014 memoir, Rumours of Glory, Cockburn said that his grandfather Arthur Graham had served as the chief fire inspector for the Lower Ottawa Forest Protective Association, whose responsibilities included protecting forests in the region from fires. Graham's work was mentioned in a 1915 report by the Canadian Forest Service's Commission of Conservation. Cockburn said in his memoir that "I wonder what Grandpa Graham would think of my tree song. Would he lament or applaud the current conditions of North American forests?"

== Release and legacy ==
"If a Tree Falls" received airplay on album-oriented rock radio stations in North America. Doug Clifton of the KBCO radio station in Boulder, Colorado said that "If A Tree Falls" had "generated more phone response than anything Bruce has done since Stealing Fire". In the United Kingdom, "If A Tree Falls" was released by FM-Revolver Records in March 1989, with "If I Had a Rocket Launcher" as the B-side.

From 2017–18, the handwritten lyrics for "If a Tree Falls" were displayed at Studio Bell at the National Music Centre following Cockburn's induction into the Canadian Songwriters Hall of Fame. The lyrics were included in a notebook penned by Cockburn and loaned by McMaster University, which had received the notebook from Cockburn in 2013 for archival purposes. The song was praised by conservationist David Suzuki, who commented that "I was blown away by it because we were involved in a big battle to stop a dam in Brazil. It was a powerful demonstration that music transcends language and culture and cuts straight to the heart."

== Critical reception ==
Billboard called it a "radio-ready number" and "an environmentally themed piece with a stick-in-your-head chorus." Cashbox characterized the song as "a lament for the vanishing rainforest" that "the McDonald’s corporation should take to heart before it’s too late."

== Music video ==
A music video was created for the song, which was directed by Ron Berti and produced by Total Eclipse Film Group. The music video includes performance footage of Cockburn on a stage in Toronto with additional visuals of Brazilian deforestation interspersed throughout. RPM praised the music video, saying that it was "a real eye-opener" and that "a lot of thought went into its production. If there are any awards to be won this year in the field of 'effective mass communication', Bruce Cockburn should top the list.

== Personnel ==
- Bruce Cockburn – lead vocals, guitars
- Fergus Jemison Marsh – bass, Chapman stick
- Jon Goldsmith – keyboards
- Michael Sloski – drums
- Judy Cade – backing vocals

== Chart performance ==
Chart (1989)	Peak position
Australia (ARIA)	41
Canada Top Singles (RPM))	8
US Alternative Airplay (Billboard)	20
