= Kathmandu Jazz Conservatory =

The Kathmandu Jazz Conservatory is a center for musical studies which opened on the fall of 2007 in the sub-metropolitan city of Lalitpur, outside Kathmandu, Nepal.

The mandate of the Conservatory is to create a musical environment where musicians can become knowledgeable in various musical subjects, be exposed to different music genres, and most importantly, where all musicians, from beginners to advanced, can receive a proper music education. Facilities include a 200-seat music hall, a music library, a listening lab, five practice rooms, two large rooms for ensemble rehearsal and group classes, separate rooms for both drum kit and percussion instruments, a piano practice room and a recording studio.
