= Thiers wall =

Former defensive wall in Paris

Coordinates: 48.89995°N 2.34695°E

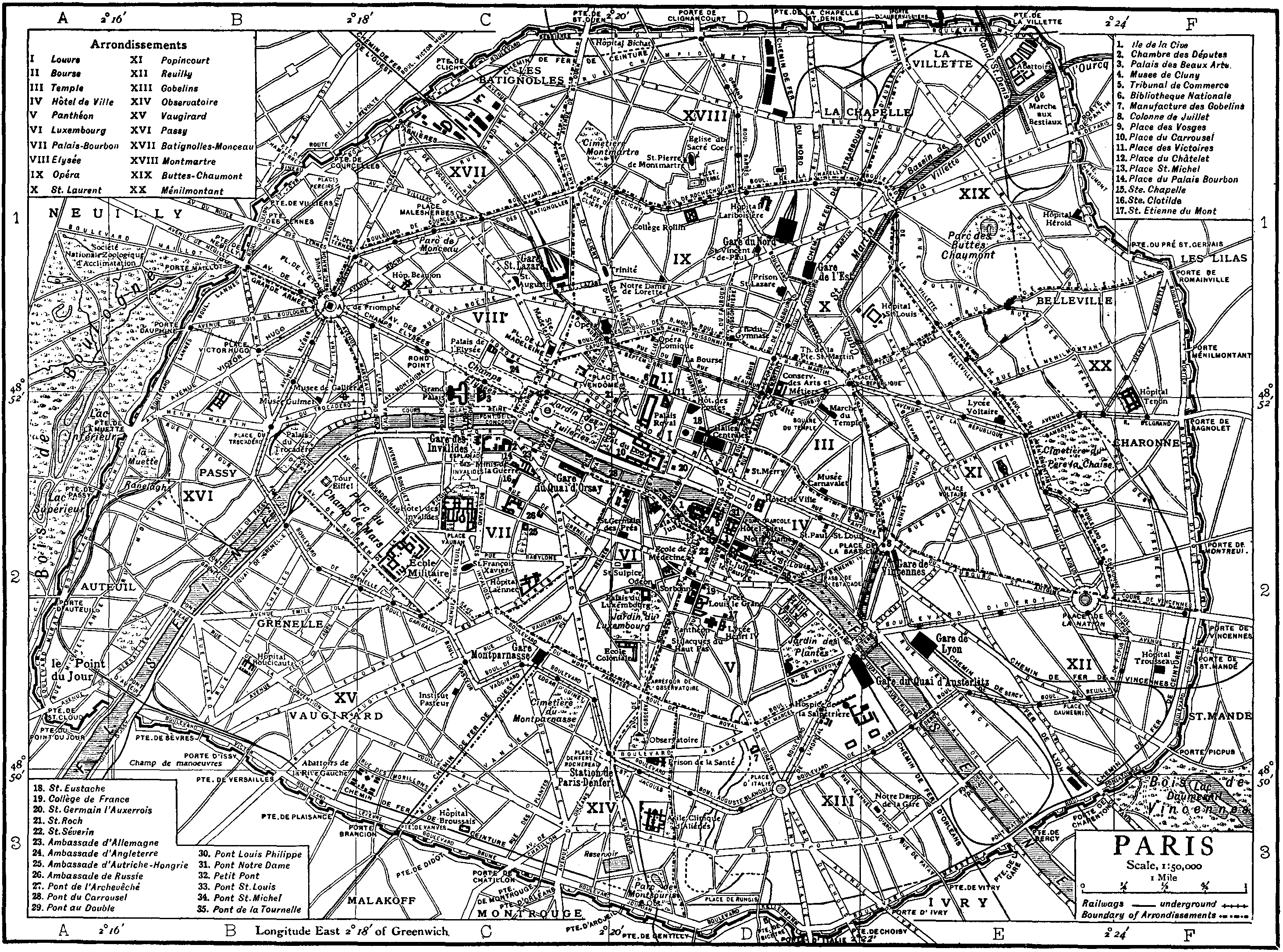
Map of Paris from 1911 showing Thiers fortifications surrounding the city

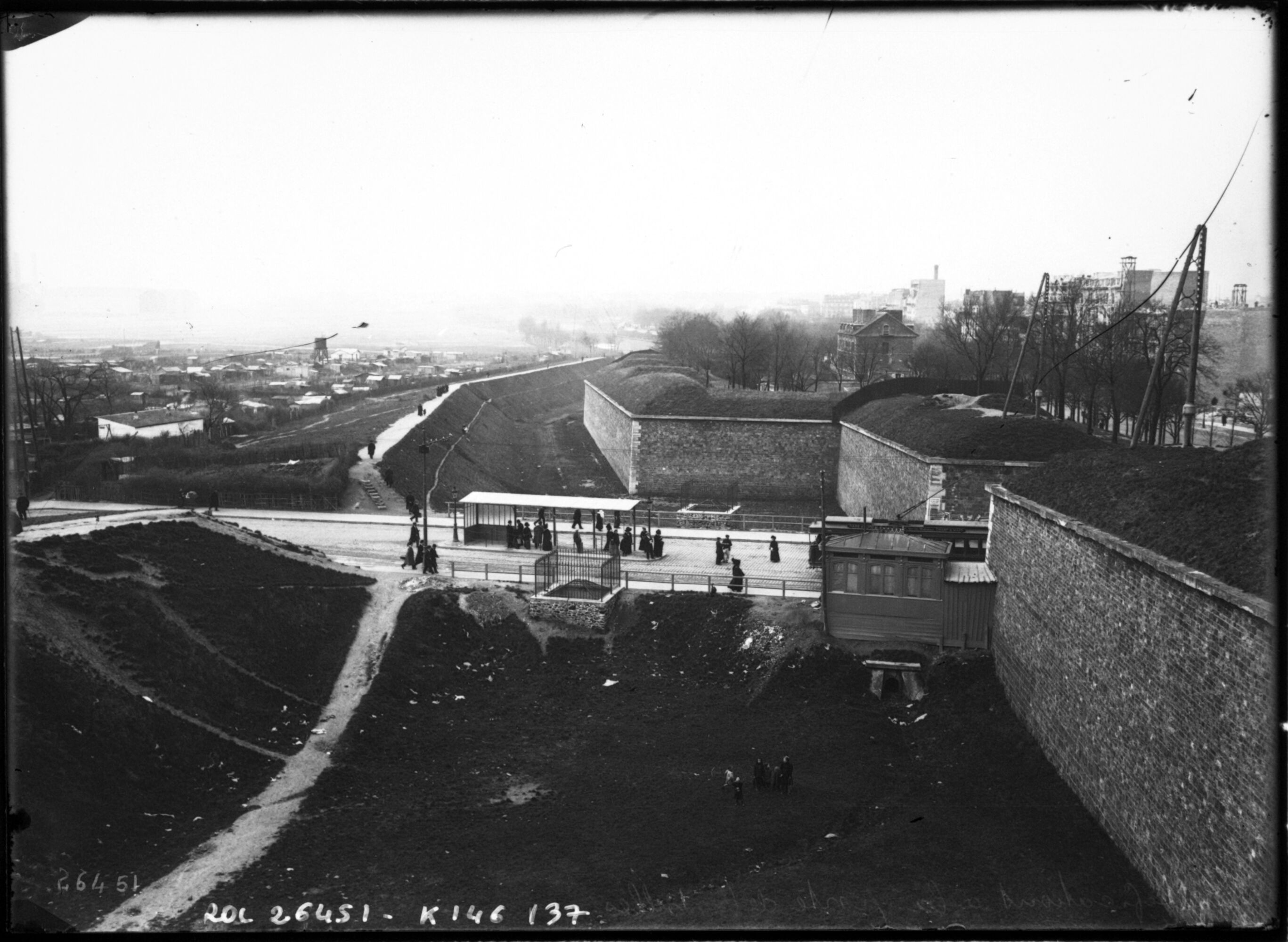
The Thiers wall and the Porte de Versailles at the turn of the 20th century. On the right is the rampart and the stone scarp wall, on the left is the counterscarp and beyond that the sloping glacis, with the slums of the zone just visible in the background.

The Thiers wall (French: Enceinte de Thiers) was the last of the defensive walls of Paris. It was an enclosure constructed between 1841 and 1846 and was proposed by the French prime minister Adolphe Thiers but was actually implemented by his successor, Marshal Soult. The 33 kilometres (21 mi) long wall and ditch made a complete circuit around the city as it stood at the time of the July Monarchy. It was bombarded by the Prussian Army during the Franco-Prussian War, captured by government troops during the Paris Commune and refortified at the start of the First World War. However, by then it had become obsolete as a fortification and was a barrier to the expansion of the city. The area immediately outside of it, known as "the zone", had become a shanty town. The wall was demolished in the interwar period; its path today can be traced by the Boulevards of the Marshals which originally ran just behind the fortifications and by the Boulevard Périphérique which was later built just outside. A few remnants of the wall can still be seen.

== Background ==
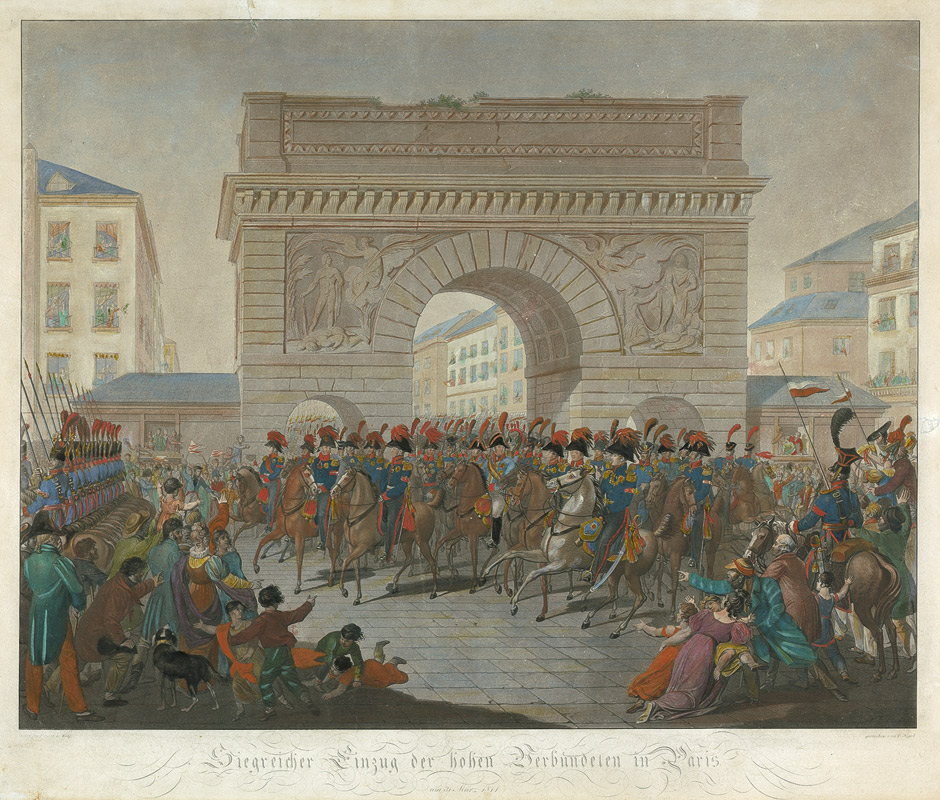
The triumphal entry into Paris of the monarchs of Austria, Russia and Prussia on 31 March 1814, an event which led to calls for the city to be refortified

By the mid-16th century, Paris was defended by walls which had been built and rebuilt over the preceding centuries, but apart from the latest additions were largely obsolete for modern warfare and enclosed too small an area to contain the growing suburbs. In 1670, King Louis XIV ordered the demolition of all the walls surrounding Paris on the grounds that France was militarily secure and that a modern system of border fortifications had been constructed at great expense, and that like London and Madrid, Paris had become too large to fortify. Following the course of the demolished walls, the first boulevards were laid out, wide tree-lined avenues whose name is the French word for "bulwark". An ambitious scheme of fortification for Paris proposed in 1689 by France's leading military engineer, Marshal Sébastien Le Prestre de Vauban, was not proceeded with. Following the Battle of Paris in 1814, when the Coalition armies had captured the city after a single day's fighting, there was renewed political pressure for the capital to be fortified. A royal commission for the defence of the kingdom considered the issue between 1818 and 1820, finally recommending a detailed plan of defences in the following year, but it was never implemented.

=== Planning ===
When Louis-Philippe was proclaimed king of the French in 1830, there was renewed interest in the issue. A further commission on the defence of the kingdom first met in 1836 and by May 1838 began to consider the defence of Paris. After much debate, it was decided that the capital should be fortified in two ways; by a continuous wall which could be manned by the National Guard and would prevent infiltration or a surprise attack, and further out from that, by a chain of detached forts manned by the regular field army, which could prevent an enemy from establishing positions from which they could bombard the city and create a line so long that it would be difficult for besiegers to enforce a tight blockade. A further point in favour of this dual approach was that regular troops would not come into close contact with the notoriously rebellious Parisians, which might lead to a loss of discipline.

=== Implementation ===
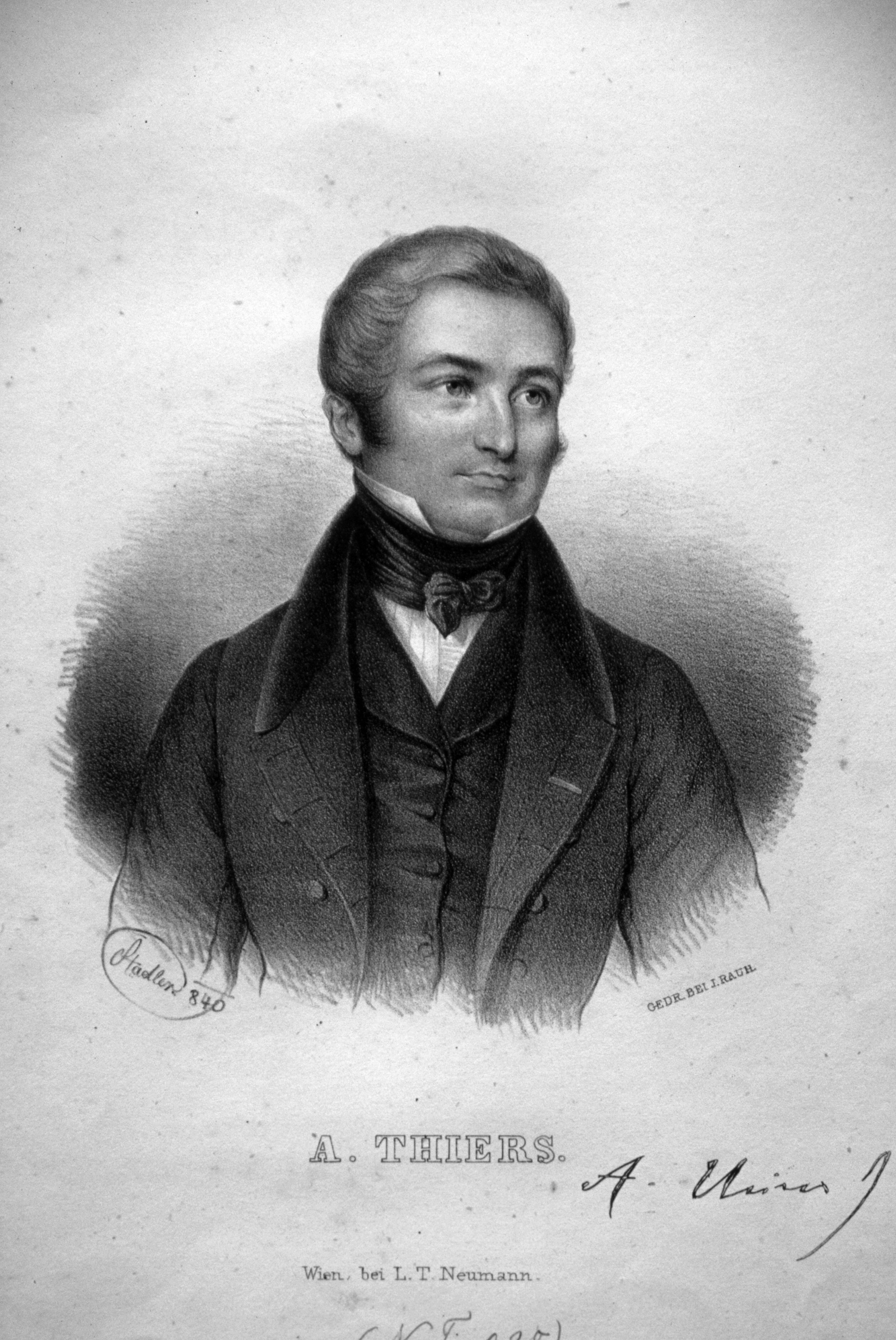
Adolphe Thiers in 1840

On 1 March 1840, Adolphe Thiers returned to office as prime minister and soon war threatened over the Oriental Crisis, when France found itself in opposition to Britain and Austria over events in Egypt. He was therefore amenable to an approach by the Duke of Orléans and François Chabaud-Latour to implement the commission's recommendations to fortify Paris. Chabaud-Latour was an army officer who had worked on the commission's plans and was also a deputy in the National Assembly. Thiers obtained the backing of his cabinet for the scheme while the deputies were away on holiday, but then found there was fierce resistance from the left, led by François Arago and Alphonse de Lamartine, who suspected that the government had ulterior political motives: that the fortifications, especially the detached forts, were intended to threaten the Parisians in case of a revolt against the monarchy. Other arguments suggested that by making Paris a fortress, it would make the city an irresistible objective for any invading army. Thiers was forced to resign over foreign policy in October, but his successor, Marshal Soult, was determined to press on with the plan. Debate began in the legislature in January 1841 and the necessary legislation was passed on 3 April.

This legislation appropriated 140 million French francs for the work, including 17,970 million francs for land acquisition, 16,608 million francs for earthworks and 83,356 million francs for masonry. It was also necessary to clear an area in front of the fortifications to ensure that there was an unobstructed field of fire. Initially, an area known as a zone non ædificandi ("building-free zone") of 974 metres was envisaged, which would have been laid out as public parkland; however the final solution was a zone of 250 metres beyond the ditch on which it was forbidden to erect anything except a wooden fence. Although landowners whose property was confiscated for the actual fortifications were paid compensation, there was nothing for those whose property lay within the zone and was thus devalued.

=== Construction ===
The construction of the new works were overseen by Guillaume Dode de la Brunerie, the inspector-general of engineers and chairman of the fortifications committee. The fortifications not only included a continuous defensive wall or enceinte around the capital, but also a line of sixteen bastion forts lying between 2 and 5 kilometres from the wall. Although designed for all-round defence, these forts, such as Fort d'Issy, were not positioned so as to be able to support each other, unlike the polygonal forts being built by the Prussians at that time. The work was undertaken by military engineers and commercial contractors and used a workforce of 20,000 troops and civilians. The course of the works crossed through 13 suburbs and was completed in 1846.

== Description ==
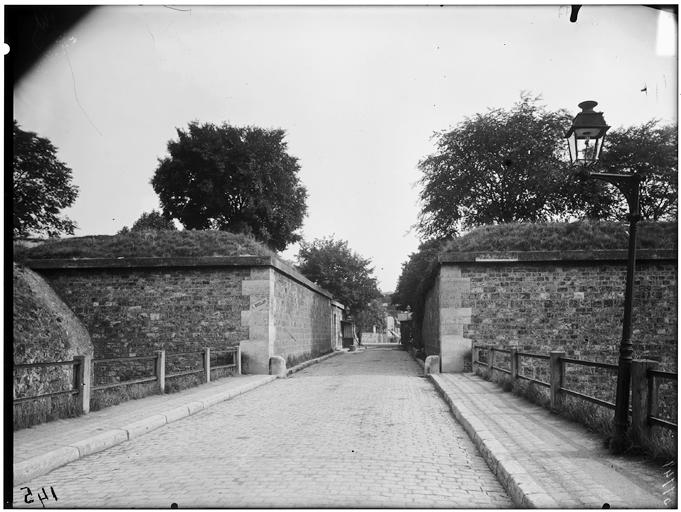
The Porte de Sceaux, about 1910

The 33 kilometres (21 mi) long main wall, colloquially referred to as "the fortress", consisted of 94 bastions. These were numbered counting anti-clockwise from Bastion No 1 on the right (northern) bank of the River Seine in the southeast of Paris, round to Bastion No 94 which completed the circuit on the opposite bank. For command purposes, the wall was divided into nine military sectors, each sector consisting of between eight and twelve bastions. The wall was pierced by 17 gates (French: portes) for routes nationales, or major roads, 23 secondary road crossings (French: barrières) for routes départementales, and 12 posterns for local access. The gates were closeable by barriers and acted as toll booths the collection of taxes and tariffs; some of the main portes were fitted with drawbridges. The wall was also pierced in five places by rivers and canals and later, eight railway crossing points were constructed. All these access ways made the wall harder to defend, but in peacetime, there were insufficient crossings for a major commercial centre which resulted in congestion.

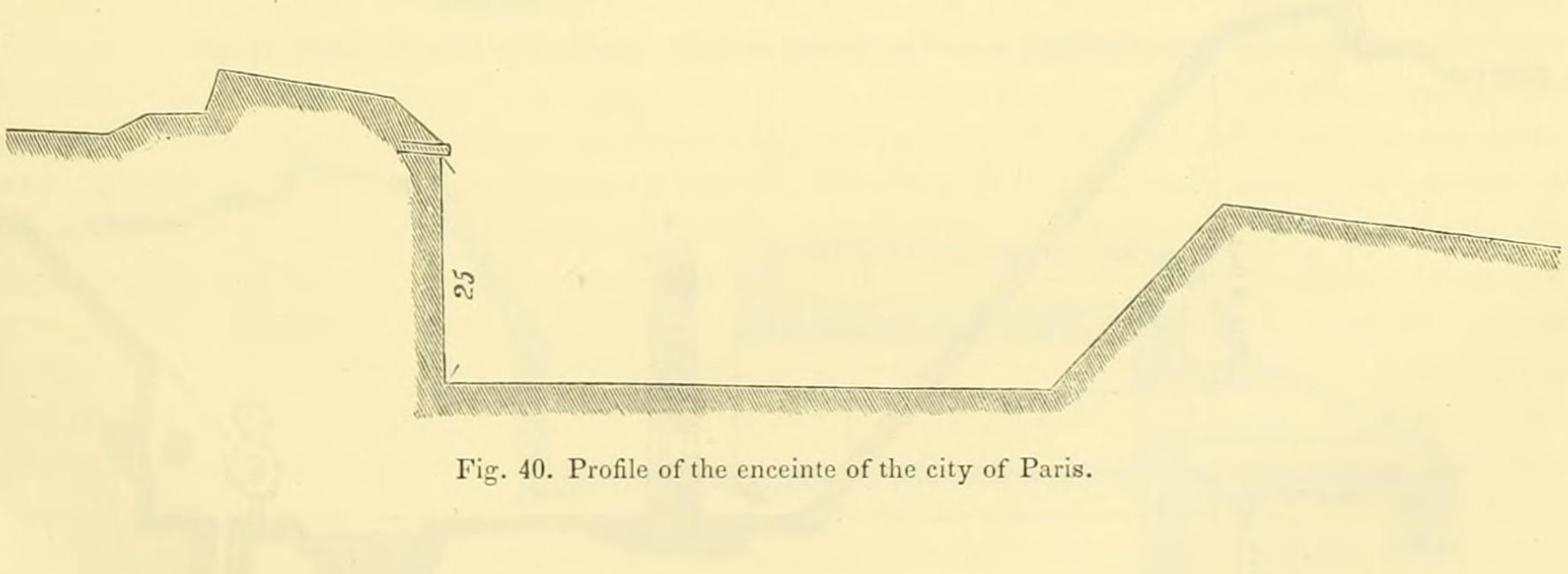
Profile or cross-section of the Thiers wall. On the left is the earthen rampart with a masonry scarp wall. The ditch is in the centre and on the right is the angled counterscarp with the glacis sloping away to open ground.

The enceinte wall itself was constructed following the system devised by Louis de Cormontaigne nearly a century previously. The rampart was composed of packed earth and revetted by a vertical scarp (or front face) wall of stone, topped by a broad earthen parapet. In front of this was a 25 metres (82 ft) wide dry ditch, bounded on the far side by an earthen counterscarp which sloped at an angle of 45° and was not revetted. Extending out from the top of the counterscarp was the glacis, a ridge intended to defend the scarp wall from direct bombardment, but the slope away from the fortress was angled so as to allow the defenders to fire on any attacking troops. However, a United States Army commission who visited in 1856 noted that the glacis, which rose 6 metres (20 ft) above the floor of the ditch, only partially protected the vulnerable masonry of the scarp wall. Originally, there was a covered way which passed along the top of the counterscarp below the crest of the glacis, but by 1856 this had largely been eroded away.

The fortifications were serviced by the Rue Militaire ("military road"), circling the city directly behind the works. During the Second Empire, it was replaced by a railway line 100 meters from the wall, the Chemin de fer de Petite Ceinture ("Little Belt Railway"). In peacetime the railway would serve to transfer merchandise and passengers between the capital’s mainline railway stations. The Rue Militaire thus relegated to a secondary role, in 1861 the city secured the authority to rebuild it as a boulevard, which was fully completed only in 1939 and which came to be known as the Boulevards of the Marshals.

== Military history ==
=== Siege of Paris ===
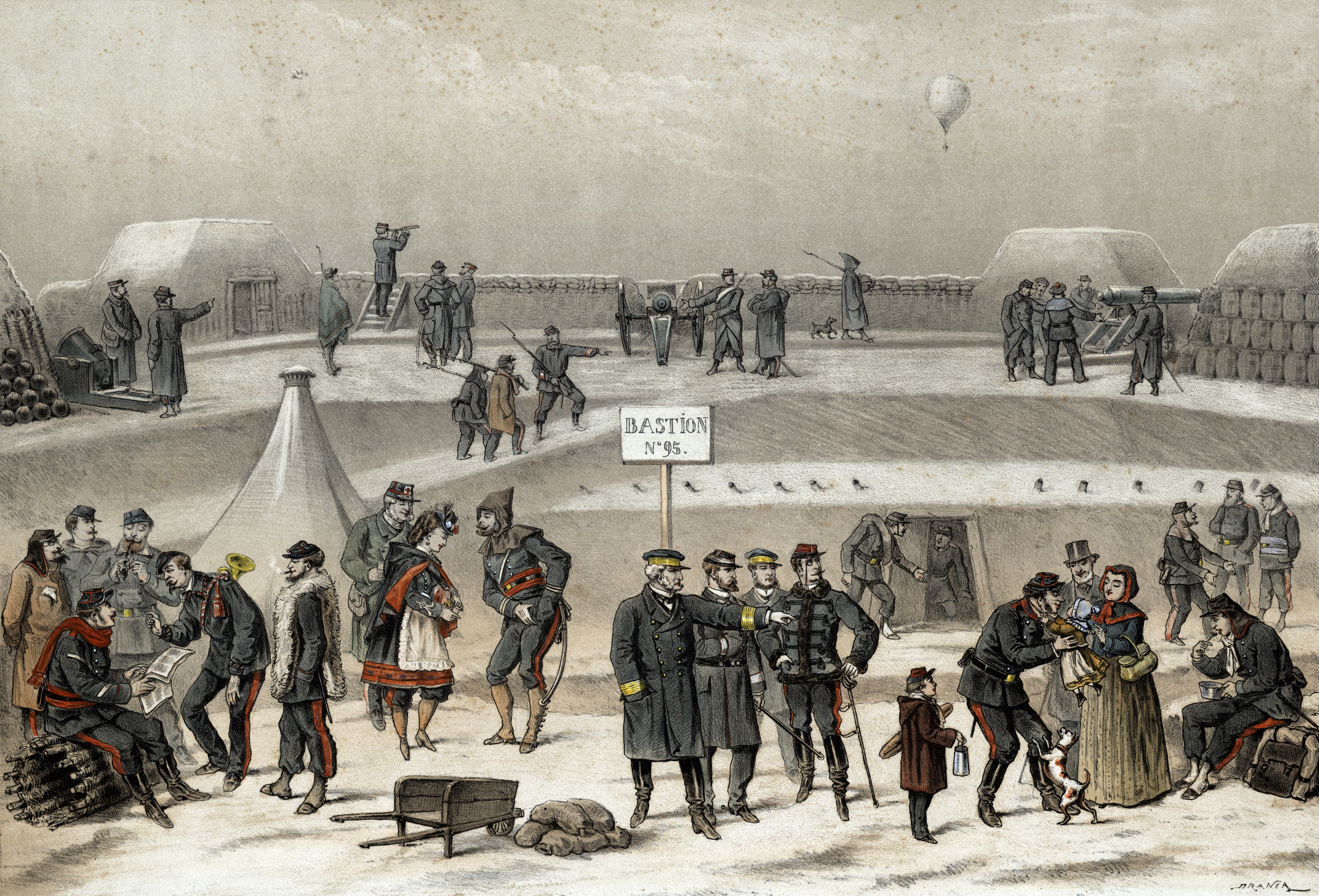
Interior of a bastion on the Thiers wall during the Siege of Paris, showing the various emergency shelters and defence improvements

In the enthusiasm of the declaration of war against Prussia in July 1870, there was little thought given to the defence of Paris, as it was assumed that the fighting would all be in Germany. In the thirty years since the construction of the wall and the outlying forts, the range of artillery had almost doubled, and there were many vantage points in the hills surrounding the city from which modern guns could dominate the fortifications. During August, work had commenced on a redoubt at Chatillon in an attempt to remedy the most obvious case, but otherwise little was done. However, once news of the French defeats at Spicheren and Wörth reached Paris at the beginning of August, work commenced in earnest.

Some 80,000 men were employed in clearing fields of fire in front of the fortifications, including felling many of the trees in the parkland of the Bois de Boulogne, the wood from which was used to build obstacles. Another 12,000 workers set about blocking or obstructing the gates to allow a minimum of traffic to pass. The openings for canals and aqueducts were blocked or closed with gratings. Dams were constructed in the Seine to allow the normally dry ditch of the wall to fill with water. A large number of redoubts, entrenchments and artillery batteries were built beyond the wall in an attempt cover any dead ground between the forts and to deny the high ground above them to the enemy. Immediately to the northeast of the wall, the area in front of Saint-Denis was flooded. On the wall itself, embrasures were cut into the parapets, traverses (embankments to protect against enfilade fire) were installed and shelters were constructed to protect against plunging mortar fire. The National Guard was expanded from 24,000 in Paris at the start of the war to 350,000 men, although Louis-Jules Trochu, the new president, quipped that "We have many men but few soldiers". In all the garrison numbered about half a million men, with 3,000 cannon of various types, many manned by naval reservists.

When the Prussians arrived on 2 September, they began a wide encirclement of Paris starting from the southwest which was completed a week later when they had entrenched themselves on all the commanding heights, a front of some 80 kilometres (50 mi). The Prussian force was outnumbered, having some 240,000 men and 1,140 guns, so it was decided not to take the city by direct assault, but by bombarding the garrison into submission. Despite their numerical inferiority, the Prussians were able to defeat several sorties by the garrison; however, supplying sufficient artillery ammunition proved problematic until late in the siege. Eventually, the loss of the Armée de la Loire at the Second Battle of Orléans which was the defender's main hope of relief and the starvation of the civil population resulted in a ceasefire on 26 January 1871 and a surrender two days later.

=== Paris Commune ===
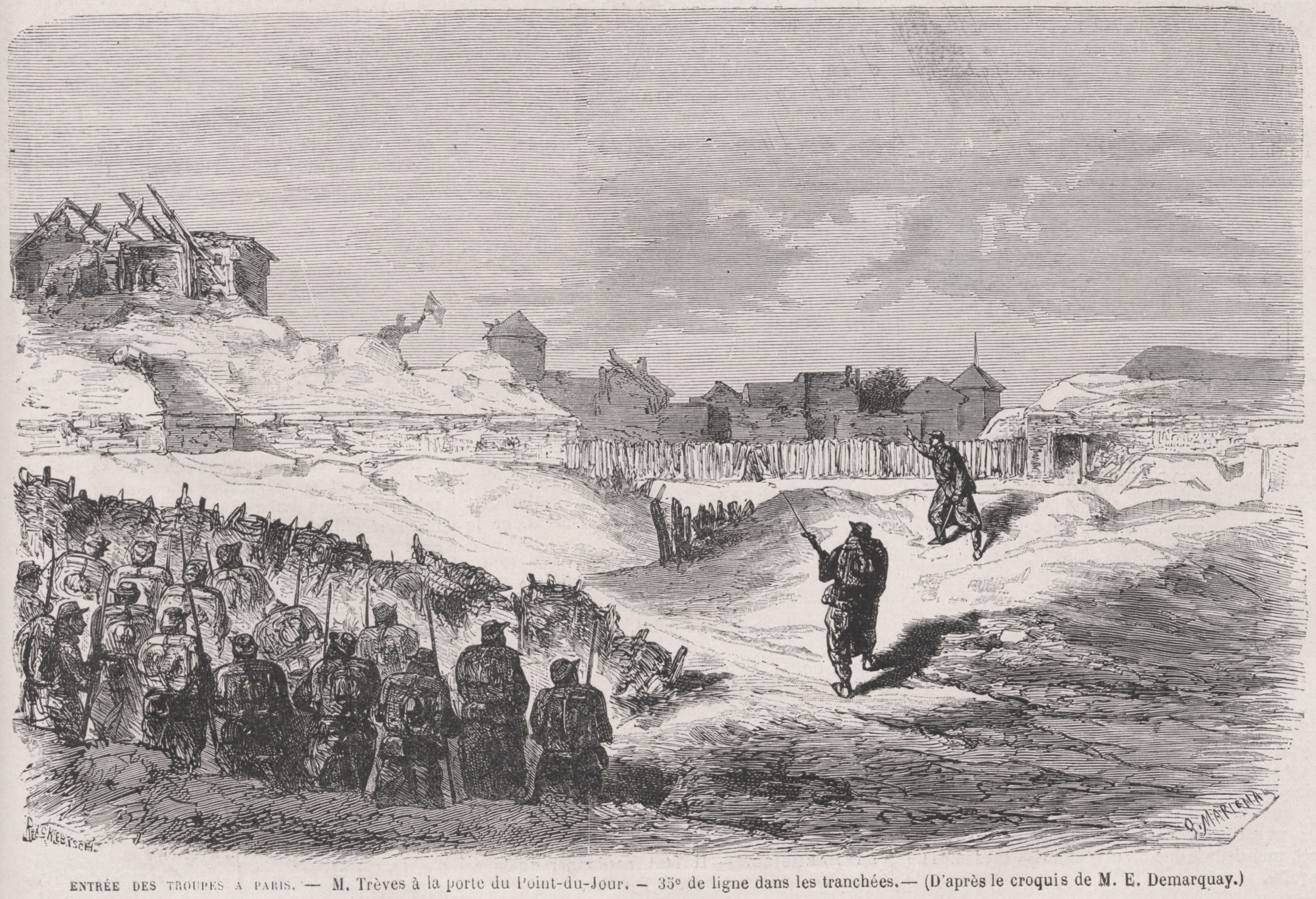
At the Point-du-Jour gate, a sympathetic civilian waves a flag on the battered ramparts to show that the Communard defenders have left.

Shortly after the end of the siege, a national legislative election resulted in a conservative and monarchist dominated government led by Adolphe Thiers. This completely alienated the radical working class Parisians, represented by the National Guard which was still under arms in the city. This led to a clash on 18 March between the National Guard and regular soldiers over some cannon stored at Montmartre; the government was forced to withdraw to Versailles and a second siege began while the Parisians elected their own government known as the Commune. Initial fighting was over the outlying forts which had been abandoned in accordance with the peace treaty with the Prussians. On the morning of 3 April, a massed foray westwards towards Versailles by 27,000 National Guards was easily dispersed by artillery fire from Fort Mont-Valérien which had been reoccupied by government troops. Fort d'Issy was occupied by the Communards and were only dislodged by a prolonged bombardment lasting until 8 May.

Once sufficient troops and guns had been gathered, the Versailles government began a bombardment of the Thiers wall itself, concentrating on a southwestern section at Point-du-Jour on the right bank of the Seine. By 25 May the wall there was partly demolished, but there was no move to assault the breach until a friendly civilian appeared on the parapet to tell the attackers that the National Guard sentries had all gone off to find shelter, allowing the Versailles army to pour into the city. In the "Bloody Week" that followed, the Communards fought from one street barricade to another, although Haussmann's new wide and straight avenues gave the government artillery good fields of fire and enabled the infantry to outflank fixed positions.

=== First World War ===
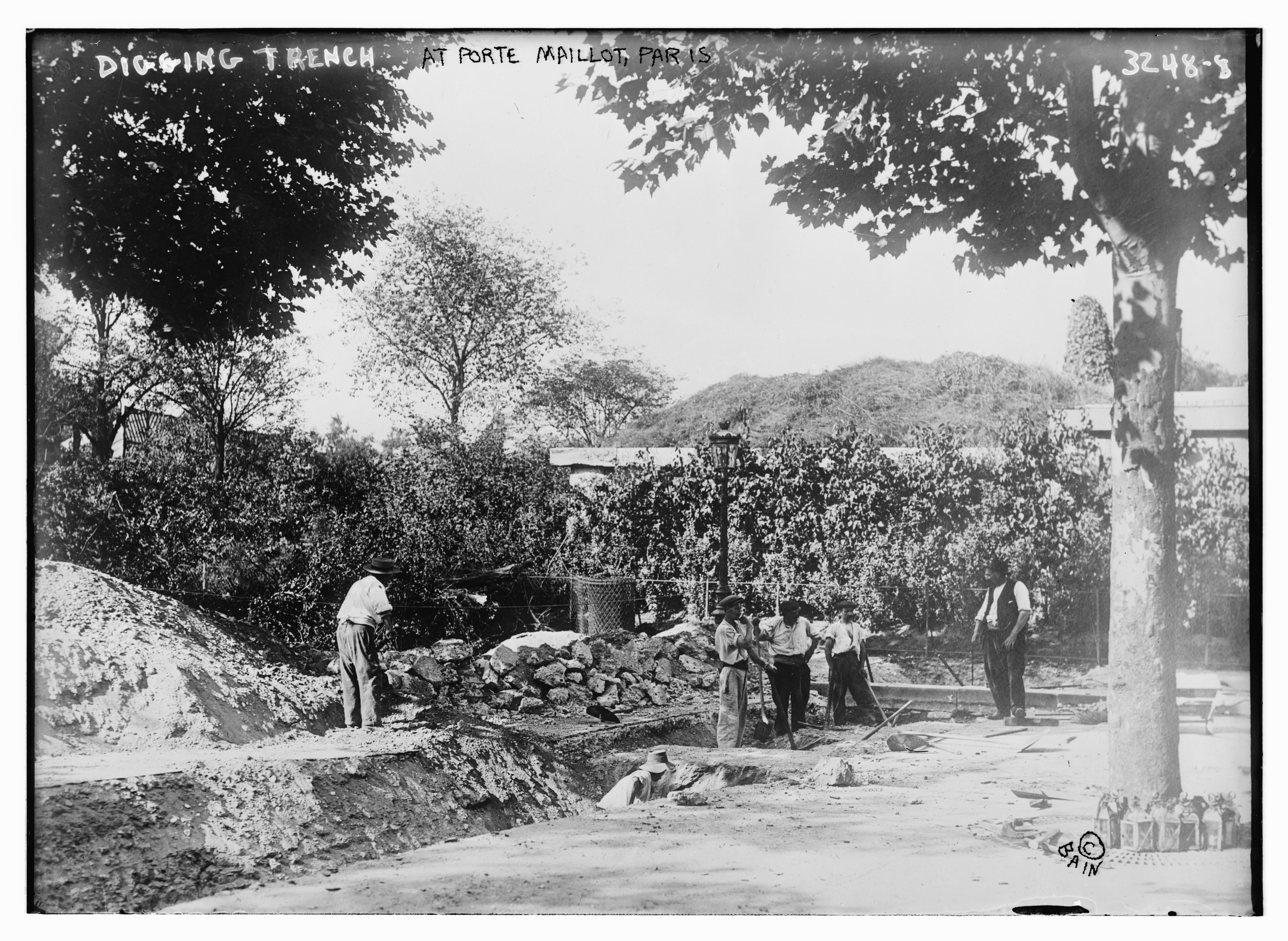
Digging a trench at Porte Maillot in 1914

After the outbreak of war, the French reverses in the Battle of the Frontiers and the subsequent Great Retreat at the end of August 1914 showed that Paris was once again threatened. On 3 September, the military governor, General Joseph Gallieni, ordered that the outlying forts be armed and the gates of the Thiers wall be made defensible by the addition of barbed wire and barriers of oak beams pierced with embrasures. Roadside plane trees were cut down to create an abatis along the edge of the ditch. An order to clear the shacks and huts built on the zone non aedificandi was enacted by the city council but was revoked shortly afterwards. Following the First Battle of the Marne in early September and the removal of an imminent threat, there were popular demonstrations against the inconvenience caused by the barriers and they were dismantled by December of 1914.

== Social history ==
=== The "little suburb" ===
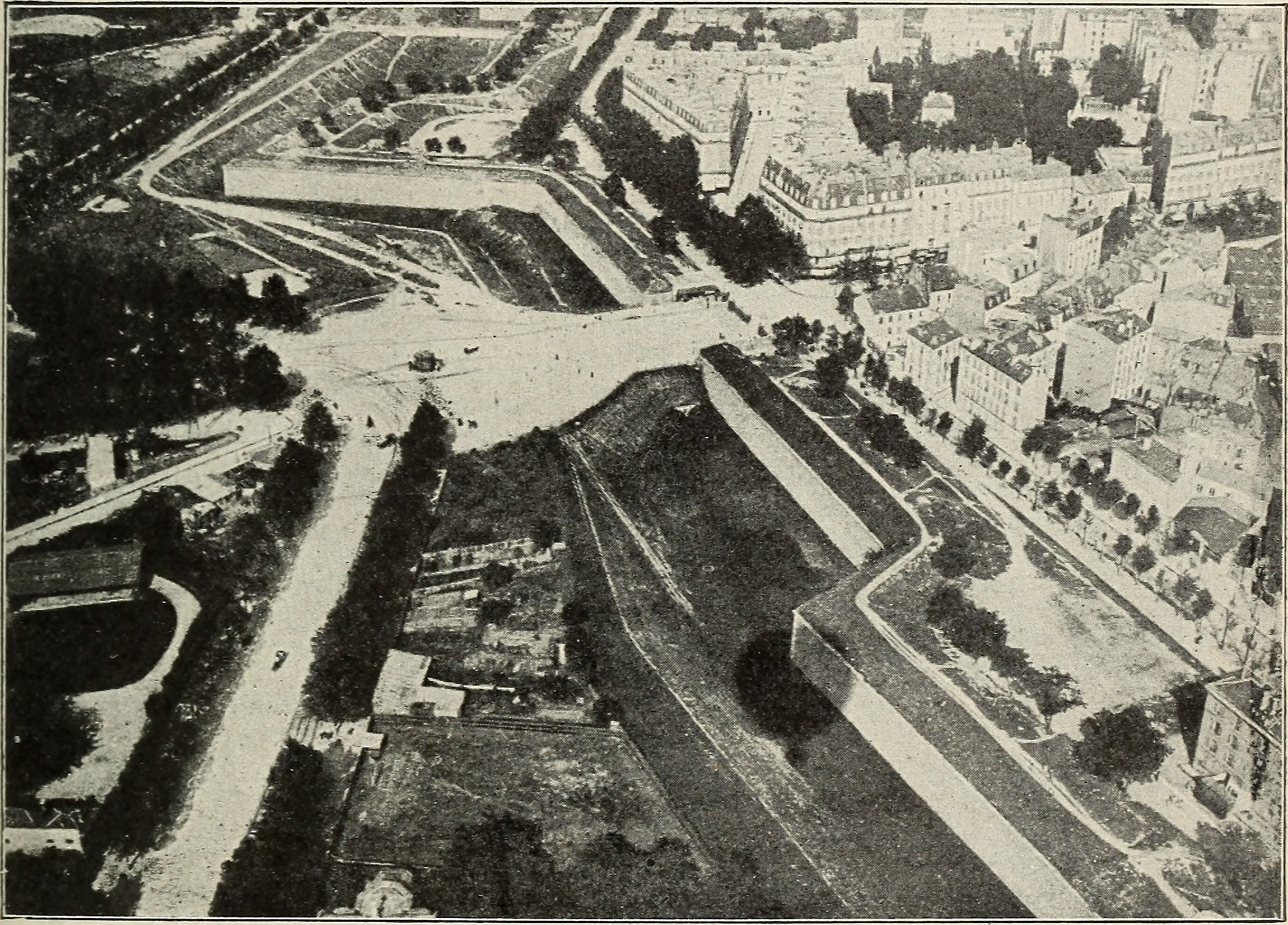
A photograph taken from a balloon by Henry de La Vaulx in about 1900, showing one of the major portes and a bastion. Note the building development inside the walls.

The building of the Thiers wall caused an immense alteration to the social structure of the outer parts of the city. The legislative boundary of Paris since the 18th century had been the Wall of the Ferme Générale, sometimes translated as the "Farmers-General Wall", which had no defensive function being only 2 metres (6 ft 7 in) high, but served to enforce the octroi, a tariff on goods entering the capital. After the construction of the Thiers wall, the open grassland of the zone non aedificandi immediately outside the new wall quickly became a popular venue for walks and picnics by prosperous Parisians. This encouraged the development inside the walls of restaurants and dancehalls to entertain them and being beyond the Ferme Générale wall, allowed food and drink to be sold tax-free. The area between the two walls became known as the petit banlieue or "little suburb", which underwent rapid development over the following decades, primarily of working class housing and industrial sites, expanding from a population of 75,000 in 1831 to 173,000 in 1856. A few areas between the walls remained rural; the last vineyards in Paris were at Butte-aux-Cailles in the south. In 1853, the appointment of Georges-Eugène Haussmann as prefect began the huge renovation of Paris project, starting with the sweeping away of overcrowded slum housing in the city centre. In 1859, the start of the second phase of development extending beyond the recently demolished Ferme Générale wall was made possible by the extension of the Paris boundary to the Thiers wall. The inclusion of these slum areas was initially unpopular with Parisians; one journalist complained that "They have sewn rags onto the dress of a queen". However, the construction of new roads and other infrastructure brought great improvements to the new arrondissements, although it was the more prosperous suburbs that benefitted most.

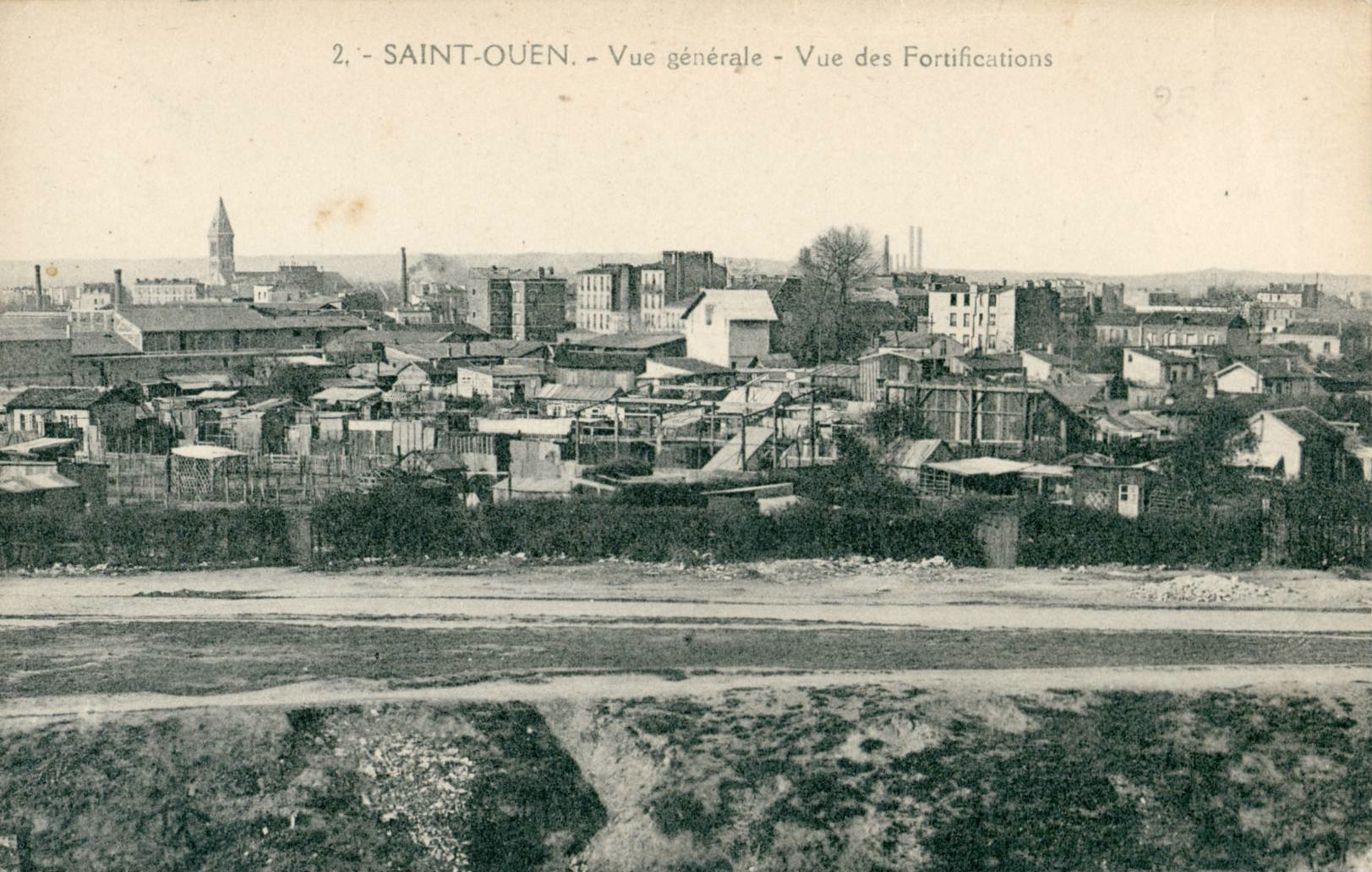
View across the wall to the slums of the zone at Saint-Ouen

=== The "zone" ===
The zone non aedificandi outside the ditch of the wall, generally referred to as La Zone, had remained privately owned and although buildings of any sort were forbidden, it was quickly occupied by poor settlers, many of whom had been evicted during the improvements in central Paris. The zone was completely cleared in the siege preparations of 1870, but was reoccupied soon afterwards and several shanty towns developed, the population of which was swelled by migrants and Romani people from the provinces and neighbouring countries. The zone varied along its length from open fields and vegetable gardens to homes made from old railway carriages, sheds and masonry slums. The last outbreak of bubonic plague in France in 1921 killed twenty rag pickers in the zone. By 1926, the population of the zone was more than 42,000. In the inter-war period, there were efforts to clear these slums but progress was slow due to legal disputes with land owners and was only completed during the wartime Vichy regime. The French slang "zonard" ("lad" in a pejorative sense) derives from the Paris zone.

== Demolition and redevelopment ==
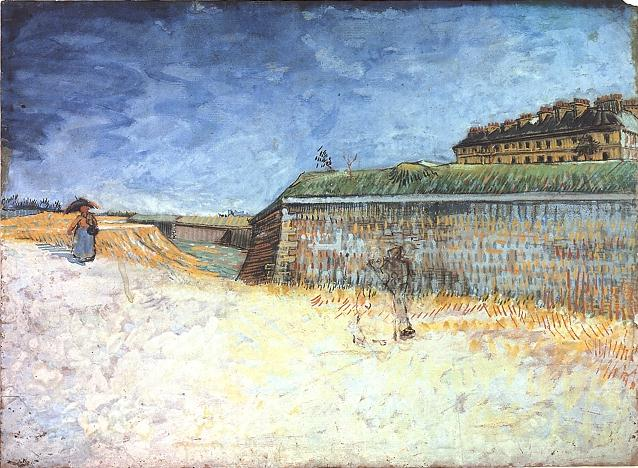
The Fortifications of Paris with Houses by Vincent van Gogh, 1887

In 1882, Martin Nadaud proposed the demolition of the wall to parliament, stating that "la grande ville étouffe dans sa camisole de force" ("the great city is choking in her straitjacket"). A scheme to replace the fortifications with a great circular housing estate was devised in 1884 by Adolphe Alphand, the director of public works for Paris. However, the grassy ramparts had become a popular promenade for the people of the suburbs, and were depicted romantically by artists such as Vincent van Gogh in his watercolours Gate in the Paris ramp (1886) and The Fortifications of Paris with Houses (1887).

In 1908, the municipal council began negotiations with the war ministry, resulting in two treaties ratified in 1912 to entirely demilitarise the fortifications, the first legal step towards their demolition. On 19 April 1919, there was a vote on the laws to permit the demolition of the enceinte fortifications. which was only completed in 1932. Some of the space created was used to double the width of the Boulevards des Maréchaux and on the rest, 40,000 new homes were built. This mostly took the form of affordable housing known as habitations à bon marché or HBM, generally in austere seven-storey apartment blocks built around narrow alleys and courtyards. In the west, some more expensive apartment buildings were constructed in Art Deco style of that era. In the south, the space was used to create the parkland setting for the student halls of residence of the Cité internationale universitaire de Paris.

On 17 February 1953, a law proposed by Bernard Lafay was passed which finally abolished the legal status of the zone non aedificandi and allowed work to start on a new ring road, the Boulevard Périphérique, which was finally opened in 1973. However, the Périphérique, which now carries 1.1 million vehicles daily, now represents a similar barrier to the integration of Paris with its suburbs as the old fortifications did and in 2016 resulted in the creation of the Métropole du Grand Paris, an administrative body for the whole Paris conurbation.

== Surviving remnants ==
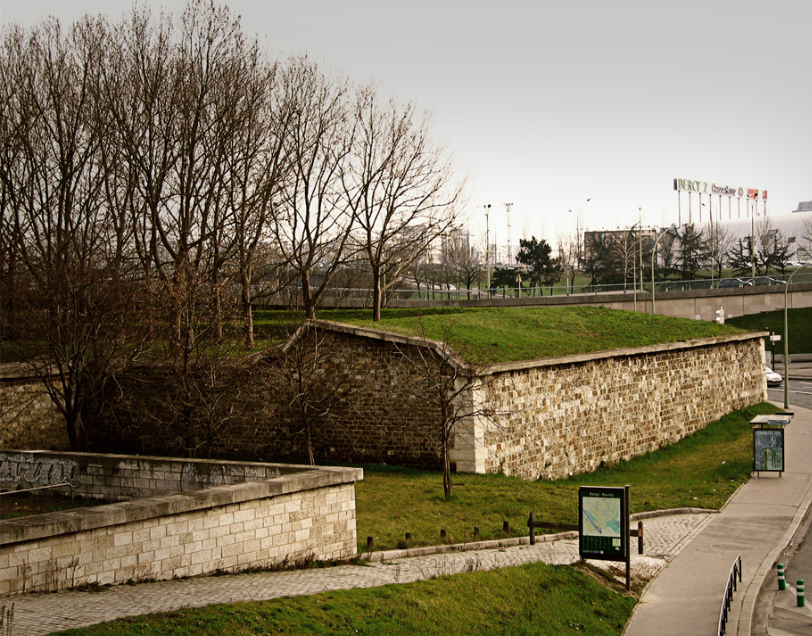
Bastion Number 1 viewed from the Pont National

Despite the systematic demolition of the Thiers wall in the 1920s, some remnants have been preserved:

- Bastion N° 1 in the Boulevard Poniatowski, near the Porte de Bercy interchange, 12th arrondissement.
- Bastion N° 44 along Rue du Bastion, 17th arrondissement.
- Vestiges of Bastion N° 45 in the area between Boulevard Malesherbes and the Boulevard Périphérique, 17th arrondissement.
- Foundation stone dated 1842 from Bastion N° 82, in a garden outside the Pavillon de la fondation Deutsch of the Cité Universitaire de Paris, 14th arrondissement

== Notes and references ==
=== Sources ===
- Cannon, James (2015). The Paris Zone: A Cultural History, 1840-1944. Ashgate. ISBN 978-1472428318.
- Cox, Gary P (2019). The Halt In The Mud: French Strategic Planning From Waterloo To Sedan. London: Routledge. ISBN 978-0367292775.
- Delafield, Richard (1860). Report on the art of war in Europe in 1854, 1855, and 1856. Washington DC: G.W. Bowman.
- Fermer, Douglas (2011). France at Bay, 1870–1871: The Struggle for Paris. Pen & Sword Military. ISBN 978-1848843257.
- Gagneux, Renaud; Denis Prouvost (2004). Sur les traces des enceintes de Paris ("Tracing the old walls of Paris") (in French). Parigramme.
- Hillairet, Jacques. Dictionnaire historique des rues de Paris (Historical Dictionary of Paris streets) (in French).
- Hall, Guy (1986). Les fortifications de Paris (Fortifications of Paris) (in French). éditions Horvath. ISBN 978-2717109252.
- le Hallé, Guy (1995). Histoire des fortifications de Paris et leur extension en Île-de-France ("History of the fortifications of Paris and its extension in Ile-de-France) (in French). Éditions Horvath.
- le Hallé, Guy, "Paris aux cent villages", La Ballade des Fortifs, numbers 34 to 45 (in French)
- Higonnet, Patrice (2002). Paris: Capital of the World. Harvard University Press. ISBN 978-0674008878.
- Hogg, Ian V. (1975). Fortress: A History of Military Defence. London: Macdonald and Jane's. ISBN 0-356-08122-2.
- Horne, Alistair (2007). The fall of Paris : the siege and the Commune 1870-71. London: Penguin Books. p. 62. ISBN 978-0141030630.
- Jones, Colin (2005). Paris: Biography of a City. New York: Viking. ISBN 978-0670033935.
- Lazare, Félix; Lazare, Louis (1993). Maisonneuve and Laroze (ed.). Dictionnaire historique des rues et monuments de Paris en 1855 (in French).
- LePage, Jean-Denis G. G. (2006). The Fortifications of Paris: An Illustrated History. McFarland & Co. ISBN 978-0786461004.
- Mellot, Philippe (2014). Paris en guerre 1914–1918 (in French). Paris: Omnibus. ISBN 978-2258106444.
- Michaud, Yves, ed. (2004). Paris: Université de Tous les Savoirs (in French). Paris: Odile Jacob. ISBN 978-2738114532.
- Papayanis, Nicholas (2004). Planning Paris Before Haussmann. Baltimore: Johns Hopkins University Press. ISBN 978-0801879302.
- Pollak, Martha (2010). Cities at War in Early Modern Europe. Cambridge University Press. ISBN 978-0521113441.
- Tiedemann, Benno von (1877). The siege operations in the campaign against France, 1870-71. London: HMSO.
- Volner, Ian (2019). The Great Great Wall: Along the Borders of History from China to Mexico. New York: Abrams Press. ISBN 978-1419732829.
