= Seine (Van Gogh series) =

Painting series by Vincent van Gogh

Fishing in Spring, the Pont de Clichy (Asnières)
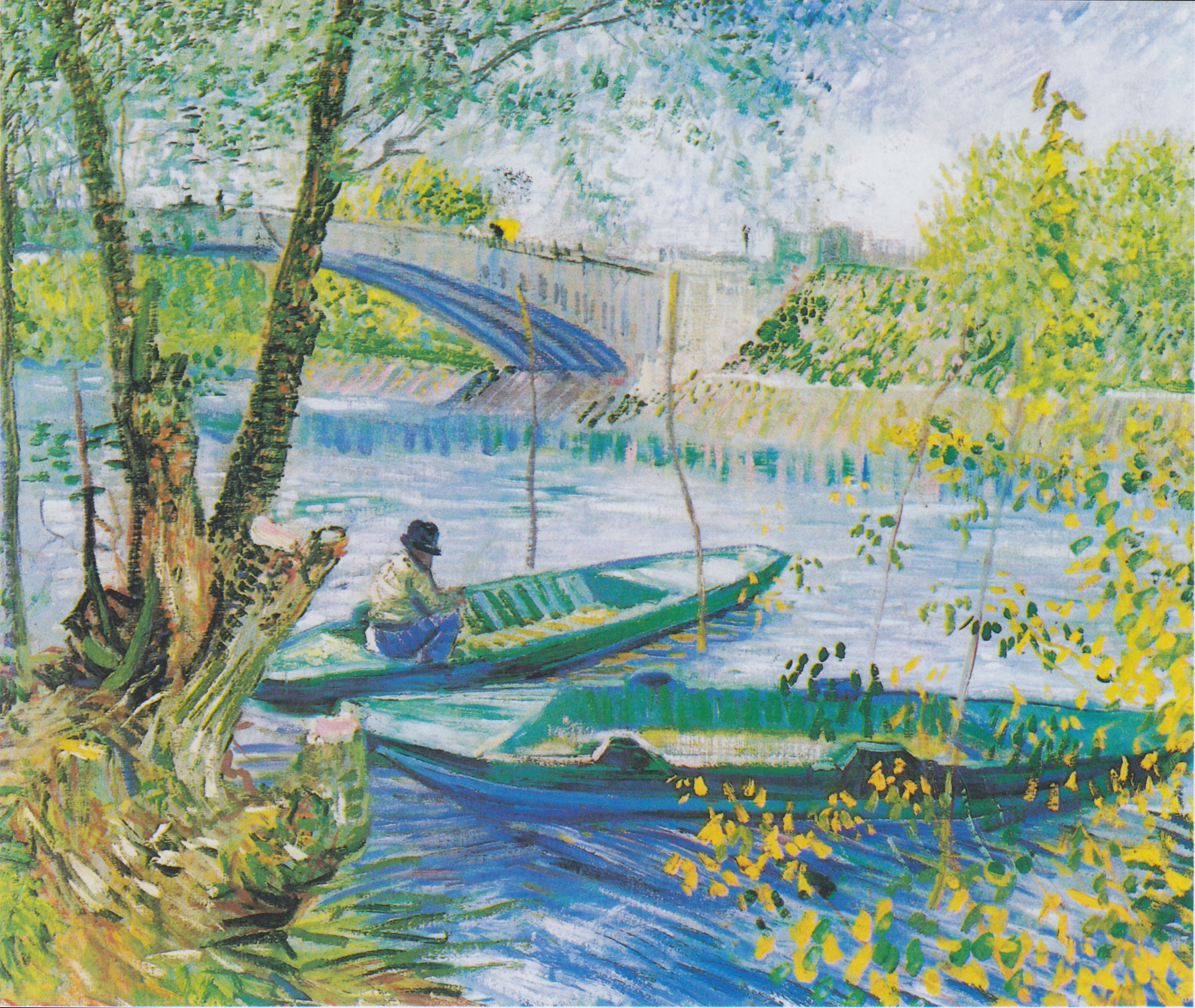
- Artist: Vincent van Gogh
- Year: 1887
- Catalogue: F354
- Medium: Oil on canvas
- Location: Art Institute of Chicago, Chicago

Seine (paintings) is the subject and location of paintings that Vincent van Gogh made in 1887. The Seine has been an integral part of Parisian life for centuries for commerce, travel and entertainment. Here van Gogh primarily captures the respite and relief from city life found in nature.

A few of the paintings were made in Paris and the rest in the northwestern suburbs of Paris in Clichy and Asnières. Through these works the audience can see a transition in his work from one of dark colors and serious themes to more joyous use of color and light and choice of themes.

In the Netherlands van Gogh was influenced by great Dutch masters as well as cousin-in-law Anton Mauve a Dutch realist painter who was a leading member of the Hague School. In Paris van Gogh was exposed to and influenced by Impressionism, Symbolism, Pointillism, and Japanese woodblock print genres which were overtime integrated into his works. The spring of 1887 seemed to trigger an awakening within van Gogh where he experimented with the genres to develop his personal style.

== Background ==
=== The Netherlands ===
In the Netherlands van Gogh was influenced by great Dutch masters as well as his cousin-in-law Anton Mauve, a Dutch realist painter and leading member of the Hague School, who had a significant early impact on Vincent van Gogh. To dull colors, van Gogh often added black to his paintings.

Examples of Van Gogh's Dutch paintings (1882–1885)

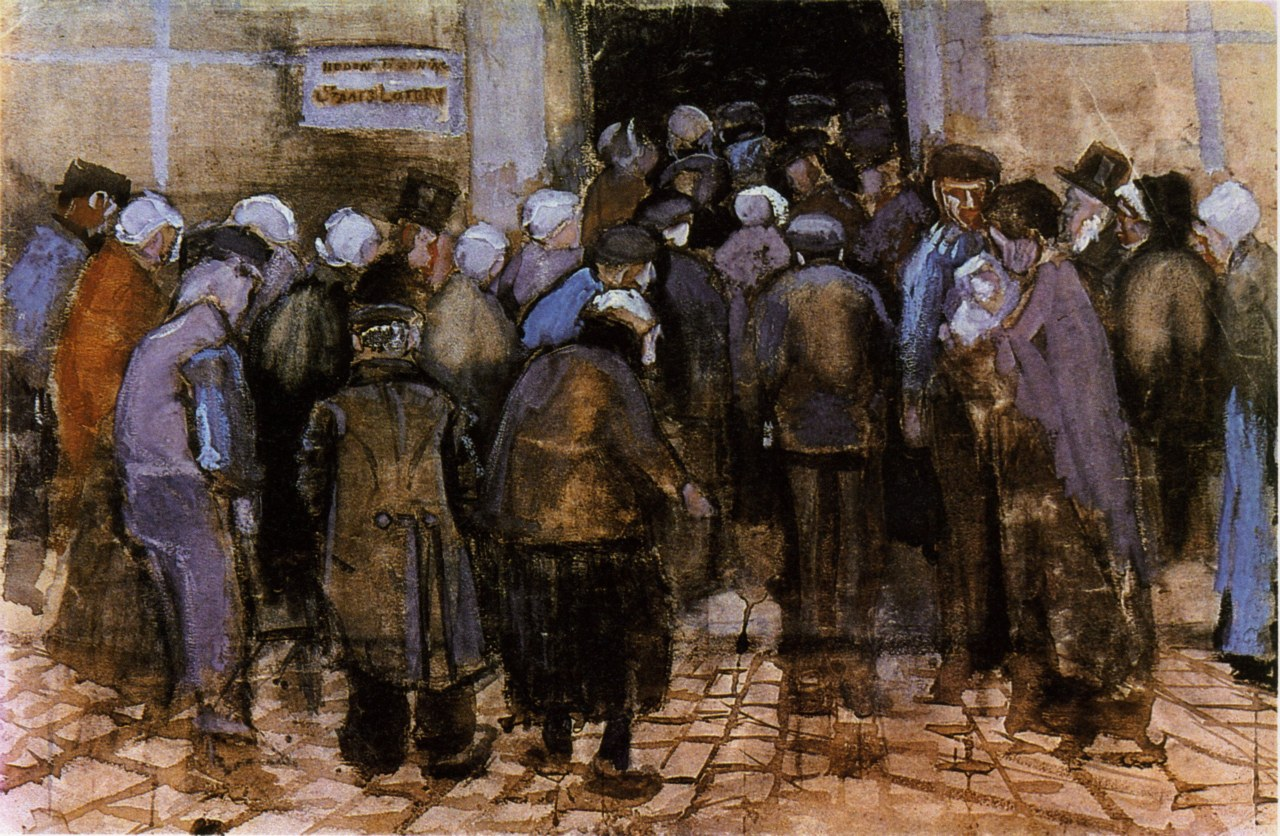
The State Lottery
1882
Musée d'Orsay, Paris (F970)

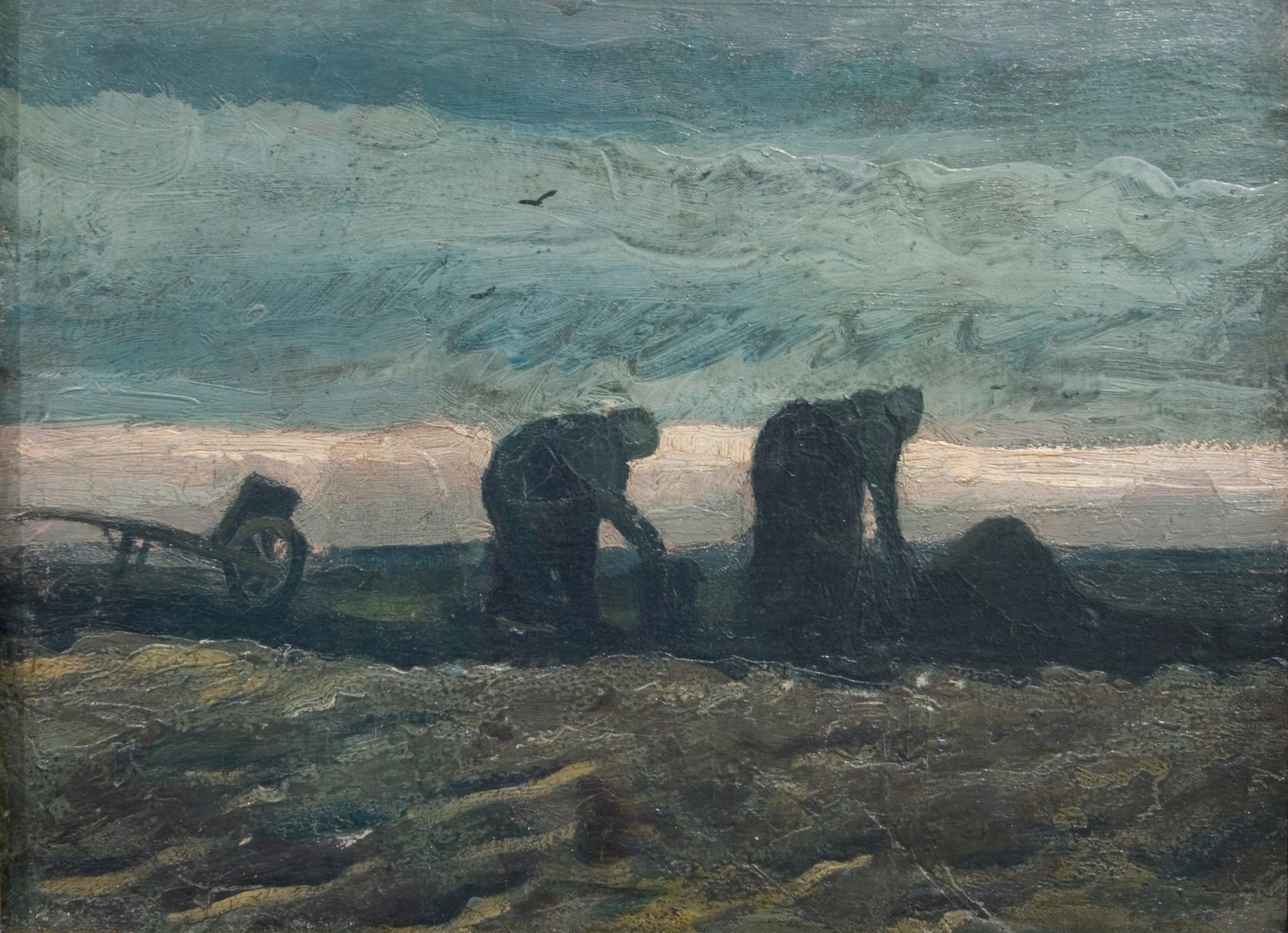
Two Women in the Moor
1883
Van Gogh Museum, Amsterdam (F19)

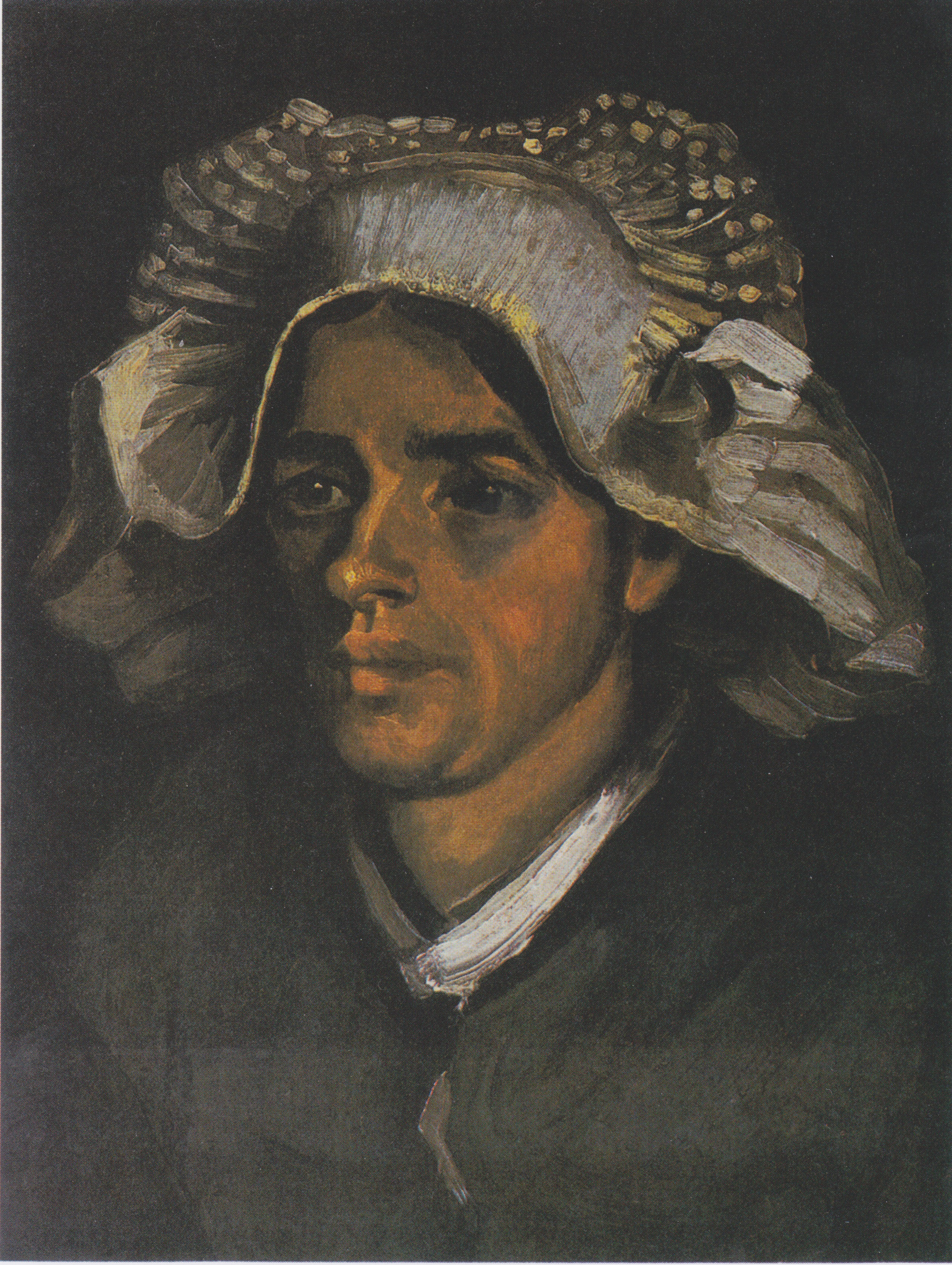
Head of a Peasant Woman with White Cap, 1885, National Gallery of Scotland, Edinburgh (F140)

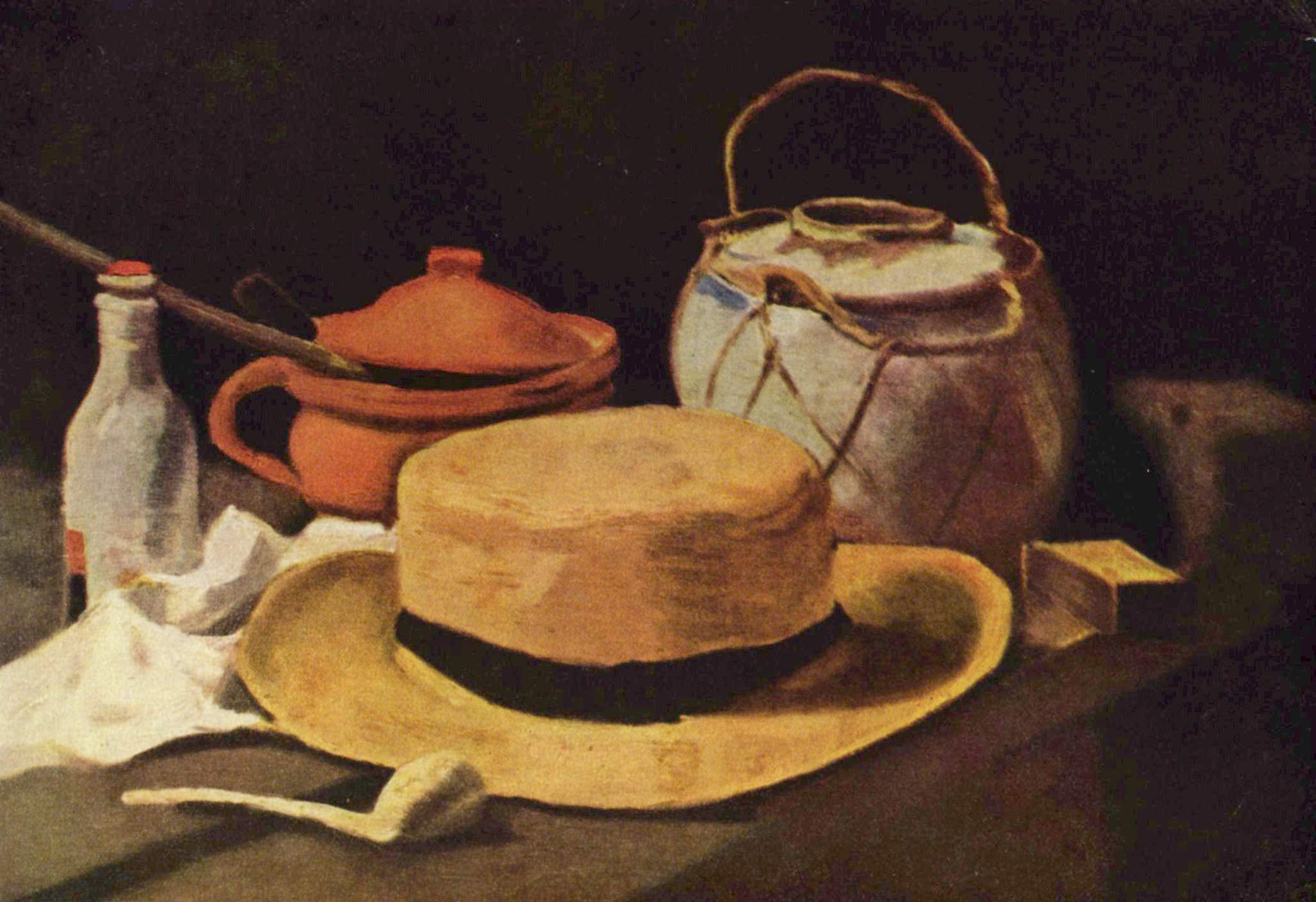
Still Life with Straw Hat
1885
Kröller-Müller Museum, Otterlo (F62)

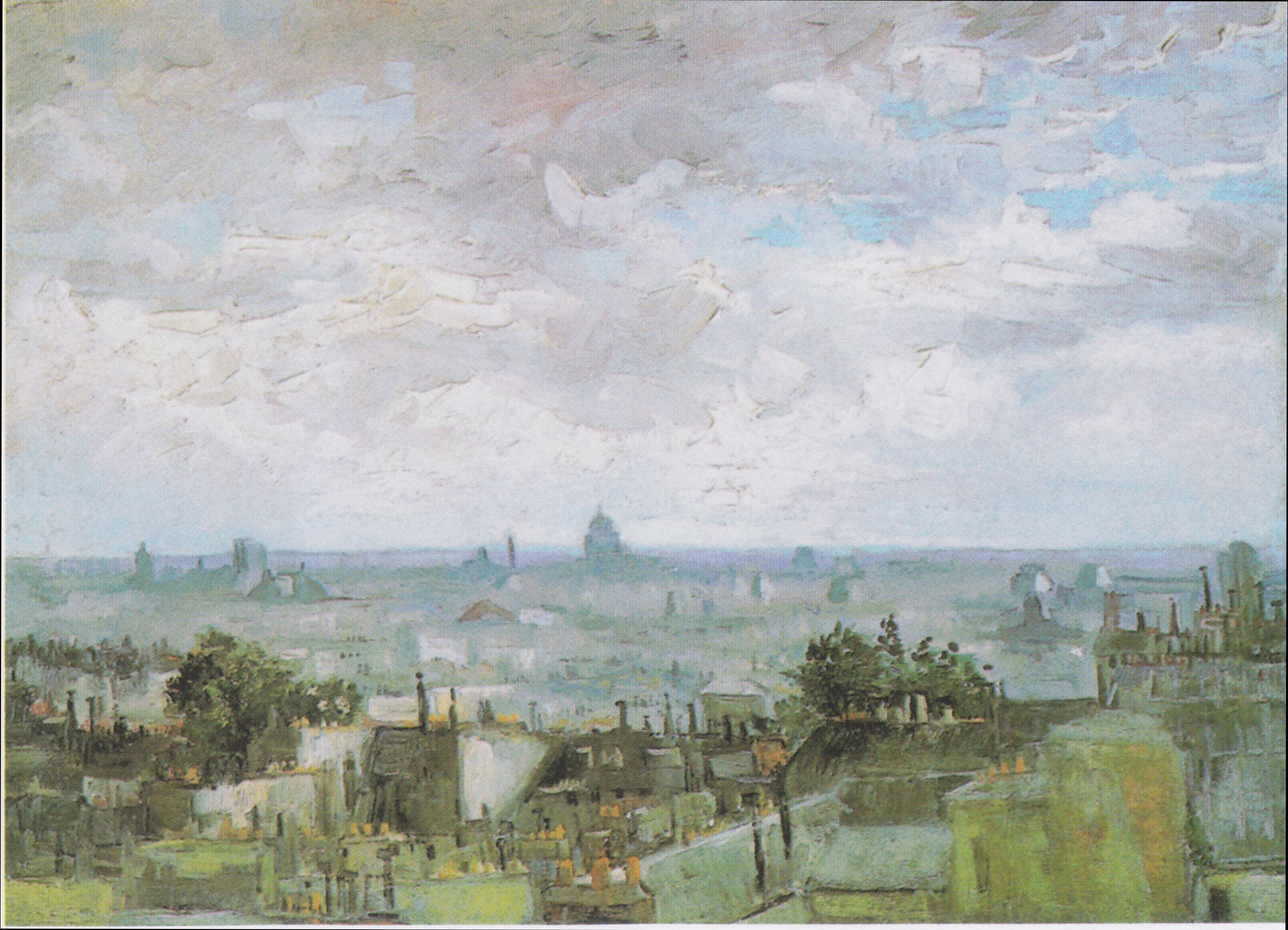
View of the Roofs of Paris
1887
Van Gogh Museum, Amsterdam (F261)

=== Paris ===
In 1886 van Gogh left the Netherlands for Paris never to return. His brother Theo, a successful Parisian art dealer, provided Vincent the support and connections for an immersion in modern art.

Starting March 1886 van Gogh studied with Fernand Cormon. During that time he lived with Theo who leased a large apartment on Rue Lepic in Montmartre with space for a studio for his brother. Three months later Vincent abandoned his studies with Cormon, but his education continued on an informal basis as he met local artists. During 1886 he was introduced to Impressionist artists and their works, such as Edgar Degas, Claude Monet, Auguste Renoir, Georges Seurat and Paul Signac. In 1887 Van Gogh continued to make important connections with other artists who he befriended and exchanged paintings with, such as Louis Anquetin, Émile Bernard, Armand Guillaumin, Lucien Pissarro and Signac. Many of the Impressionist artists also shared his interest in Japanese ukiyo-e wood block prints. In the two years, from 1886 through 1888, Van Gogh emerged as a sophisticated, thoughtful and provoking artist.

One of van Gogh's quarrels with Impressionists, though, was subject matter. In the late 1880s the avant-garde painted the modern city, one modified significantly by the work of Baron Georges Haussmann, Napoleon III's Prefect of the Seine. His plan was to build a modern city of "grand boulevards, bridges and parks", which figure into van Gogh's works of the Seine, but at an expense. The city lost tens of thousands of old buildings, some of them cherished historical buildings, and displaced tens of thousands of people to the suburbs. Paradoxically, renovations along the Seine provided some of artist's most cherished views. Prior to the renovation buildings crowded the Seine, which could only be reached at right angles from narrow streets. New bridges were built and existing ones rebuilt, without shops and other structures that previously sat on the bridges. The city benefited by more light and air and improved commerce. To celebrate the modern city, Impressionists painted the changing urban landscape. Many, including van Gogh, felt that the city "now dwarfed the individual." This was one of the key reasons for van Gogh's growing unease in Paris.

=== The Seine ===
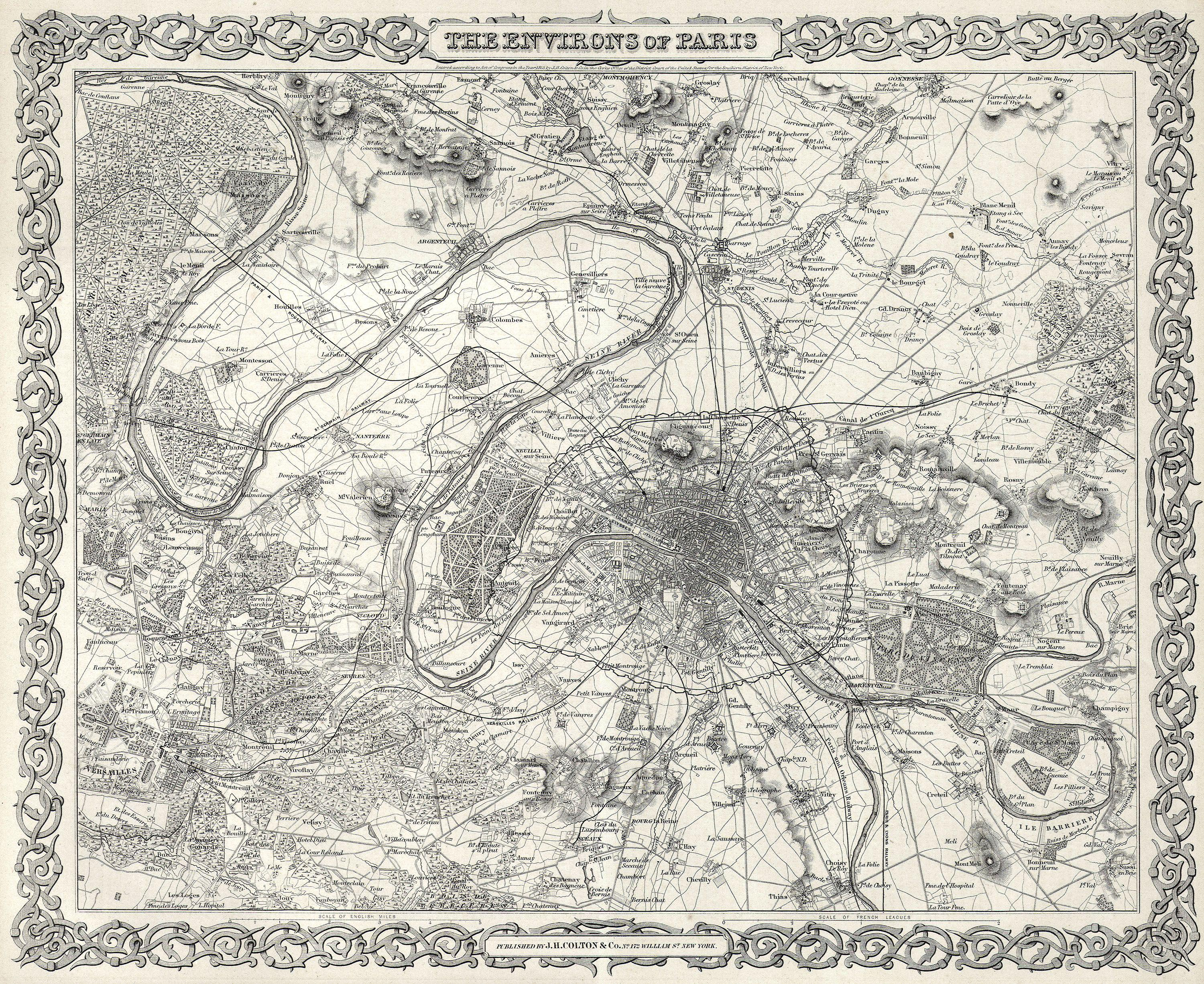
1855 Colton Map of Paris area and the river Seine

The Seine (Latin: Sequana) is named for its snake-like course from inland France to the English Channel at Le Havre. Numerous locks and bridges are found in the river Seine. The Seine is rich in history, provides commercial navigation and has been a source of inspiration to artists for centuries. For more than 4,500 years, the Seine has provided a means of transportation. As Paris grew, the Seine was important for trade of commodities such as firewood, grain and wine. Efficient travel, though, was not possible until canals were added and river depths were controlled in the mid to late 19th century. Many of key Paris buildings and monuments are located along the Seine.

Starting in the 1860s Impressionists left their studios to paint en plein air (in the open air) and one of their first subjects was the Seine. Paul Gauguin painted Pont d'Iéna, the future site of the Eiffel Tower, when the area was filled with homes and gardens. From Notre Dame de Paris, Camille Pissarro painted the Louvre. Armand Guillaumin captured the smoke spewing factory chimneys of Ivy. In 1874 Alfred Sisley made the graphic paintings of the floods of Le Port-Marly, located near Paris. Claude Monet, Édouard Manet and Auguste Renoir painted bridges, trees and sailboats at Argenteuil located in the northwestern suburbs of Paris. And van Gogh and others painted the Seine.

== Paintings ==
Longing for tranquil settings, van Gogh began to paint beyond the city fortifications and along the banks of the Seine, in Asnières and the island of Grand Jatte. He experimented with a lighter, more colorful palette than used in his early Dutch paintings or Montmartre series.

=== Paris ===
Paintings made in Paris (1886)

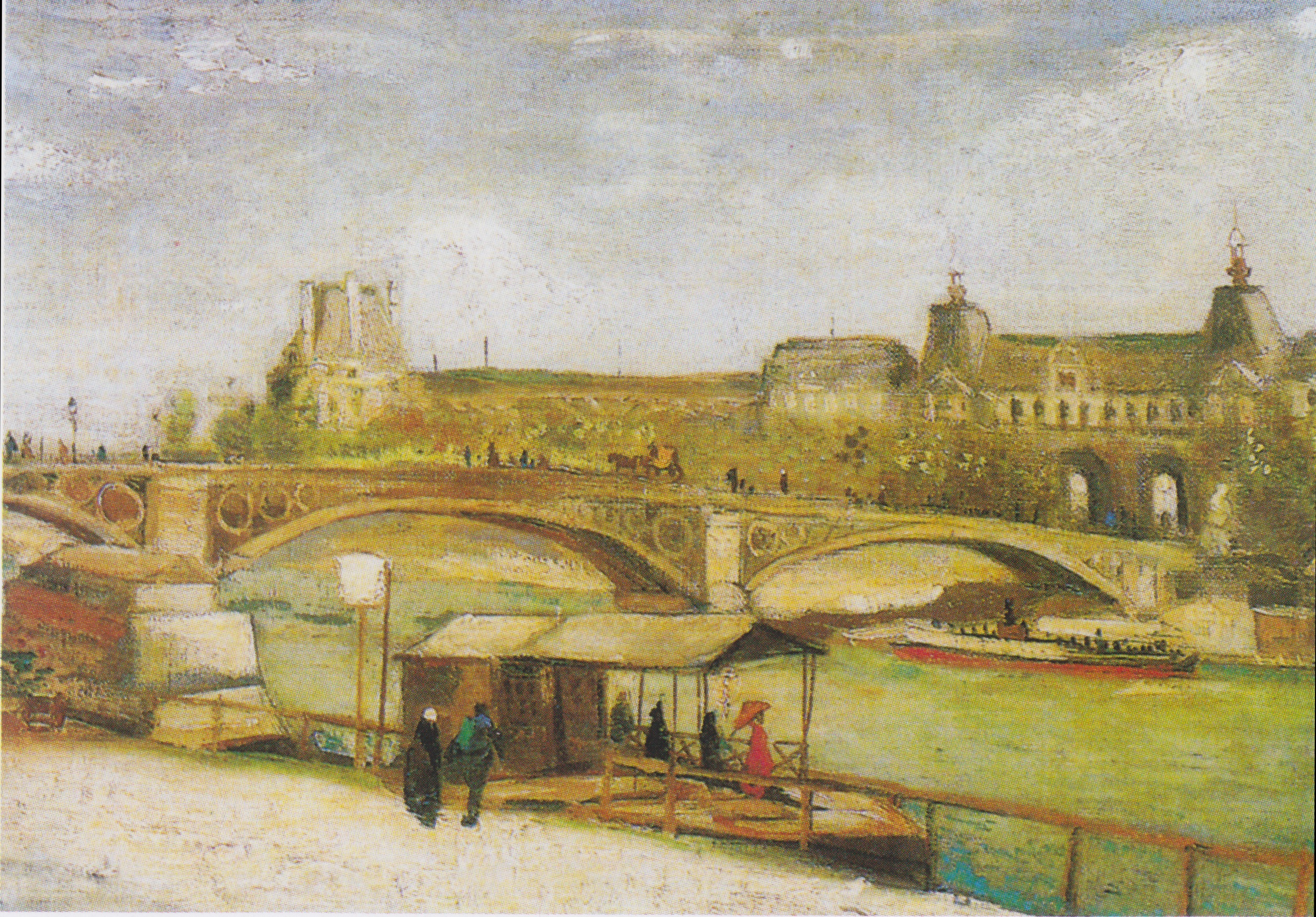
Pont du Carrousel with Louvre
June 1886
Private collection (F221)

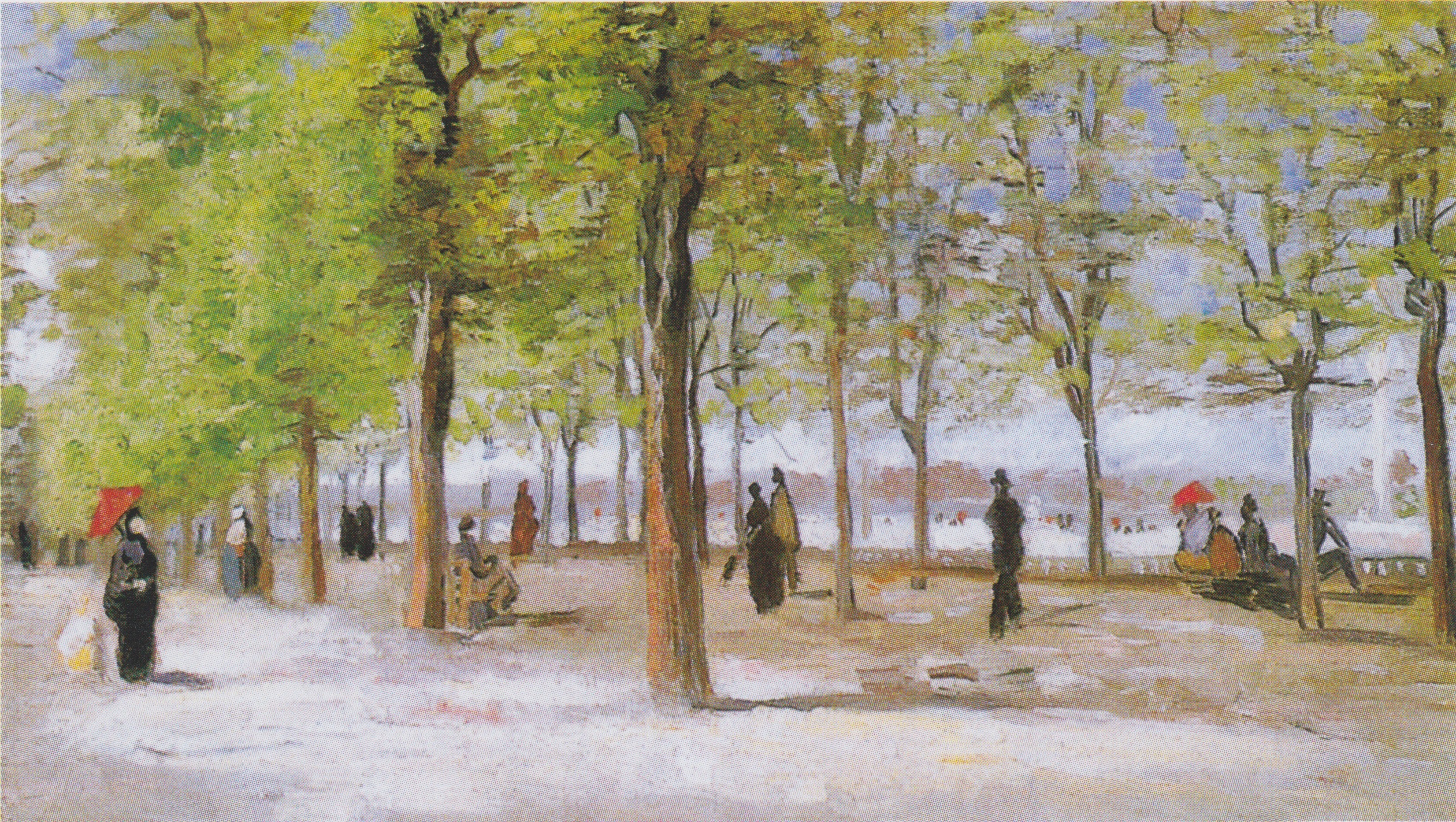
Lane at the Jardin du Luxembourg
June–July 1886
Sterling & Francine Clark Art Institute, Williamstown, Massachusetts (F223)

Upon arriving in Paris in March 1886, the Musée du Louvre was the first placed van Gogh visited, directly after exiting the train. In late 1886 he writes of his interest in Impressionism, yet not quite "joined the club". His intention, he says, is to use vivid color and not greys. In 1886, he did twelve landscapes, "frankly green frankly blue" [such as Lane at the Jardin du Luxembourg] as he struggled "for life and progress in art". It was in July 1886 that his brother Theo began to notice changes in Vincent's paintings and noted Parisian artists began swapping paintings with him.

==== Pont du Carrousel with Louvre ====
Pont du Carrousel with Louvre depicts the bridge that crosses the Seine named Pont du Carrousel and behind it the Louvre. Pont de Carrousel is a bridge that leads to the Louvre which is accessed through "guichets" du Carrousel and guichets du Louvre. Guichets are gates and commonly used for the passages into the Louvre. The Louvre was built about 1200 as a fortress. In the 14th century the Louvre was expanded to a residence for Charles V. The old fortress was removed in the 16th century replaced by a Renaissance palace which was expanded over the years. It is now one of the world's most important museums, its collections starting from works held by the kings of France.

==== Lane at the Jardin du Luxembourg ====
Lane at the Jardin du Luxembourg is situated in the gardens of the Palais Luxembourg. The Palais Luxembourg was built in 1615 for Marie de' Medici, widow of Henry IV, on the grounds of the mansion of François de Luxembourg, duc de Piney, that she purchased in 1612. She did not feel at home at the Louvre and desired to live in a place that reminded her of her homeland, Florence. During the Revolution the palace was overtaken and became a state prison. In 1795 it became the site of the first Directory and then the seat of the senate for Napoleon. The Luxembourg Gardens are now a public park and a place of respite for residents and visitors of Paris. Among the treed grounds are fountains and statues.

The painting also named Terrace in the Luxembourg Garden depicts a spring day in the park. Here Van Gogh has begun to leverage what he has learned about modern art, color and light. Thick brushstrokes foretell his evolving style. The remoteness with which the painting was made is typical of an Impressionist's approach.

=== Pont de Clichy, near Asnières ===
Paintings of Clichy (1887)

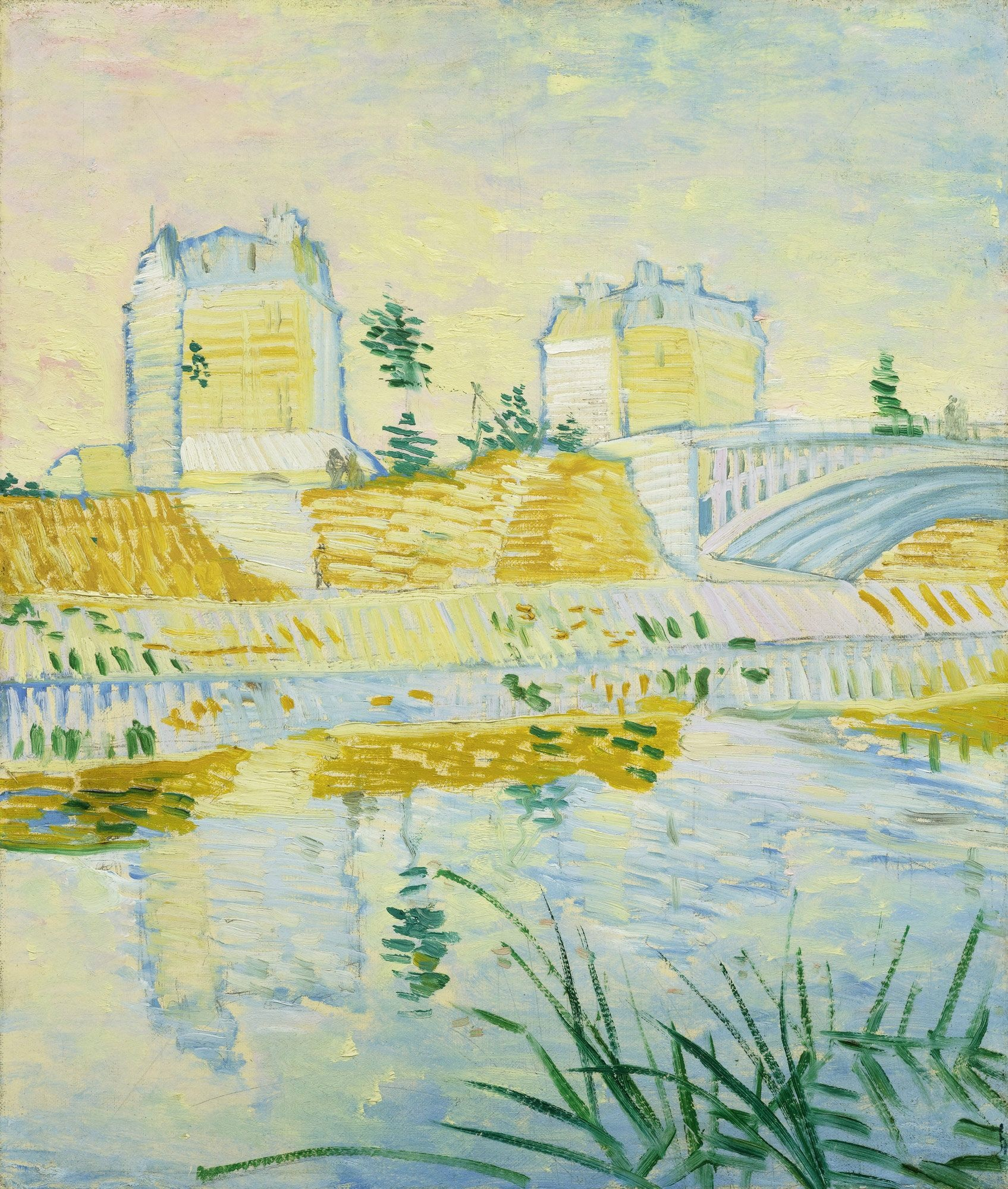
Bridge of Asnières also The Seine with the Pont de Clichy
1887
Wallraf-Richartz Museum, Cologne, Germany (F303)

Van Gogh remained anxious and lonely during his first year in Paris, but with the spring in 1887 he began to explore outside of central Paris for more pastoral settings. From Rue Lepic in Montmartre van Gogh took the Boulevard de Clichy to the southern banks of the Seine in the old Commune de Clichy. Beyond that was Asnières and La Grand Jatte island, also the scene of van Gogh's paintings of the Seine.

==== The Seine with the Pont de Clichy ====
Of making The Seine with the Pont de Clichy, also named Bridges of Asnières (F303), van Gogh wrote, "I've been worried by the sunset with figures and a bridge that I spoke of to Bernard. The bad weather prevented me working on the spot and I’ve completely ruined it trying to finish it at home. However I began again at once, the same subject on another canvas, but as the weather was quite different, in grey tones and without figures."

==== Gate in the Paris Ramp ====
In one of van Gogh's early works of Porte de Clichy, one of the city gates into Paris, Gate in the Paris ramp, 1886 (F1401), image not shown, van Gogh began to experiment with adding brighter, contrasting colors to his paintings. Porte de Clichy is one of entrances through the fortifications of Paris, 30 kilometers in length, that surround the city. In the summer of 1887 he produced four watercolors of these city defences. In making this painting van Gogh sketched the ramparts while making note of the colors that he wished to use, such as violet for the left wall and yellow for the right one. van Gogh also made a watercolor painting of The Fortifications of Paris with Houses also known as The Ramparts of Paris in 1887.

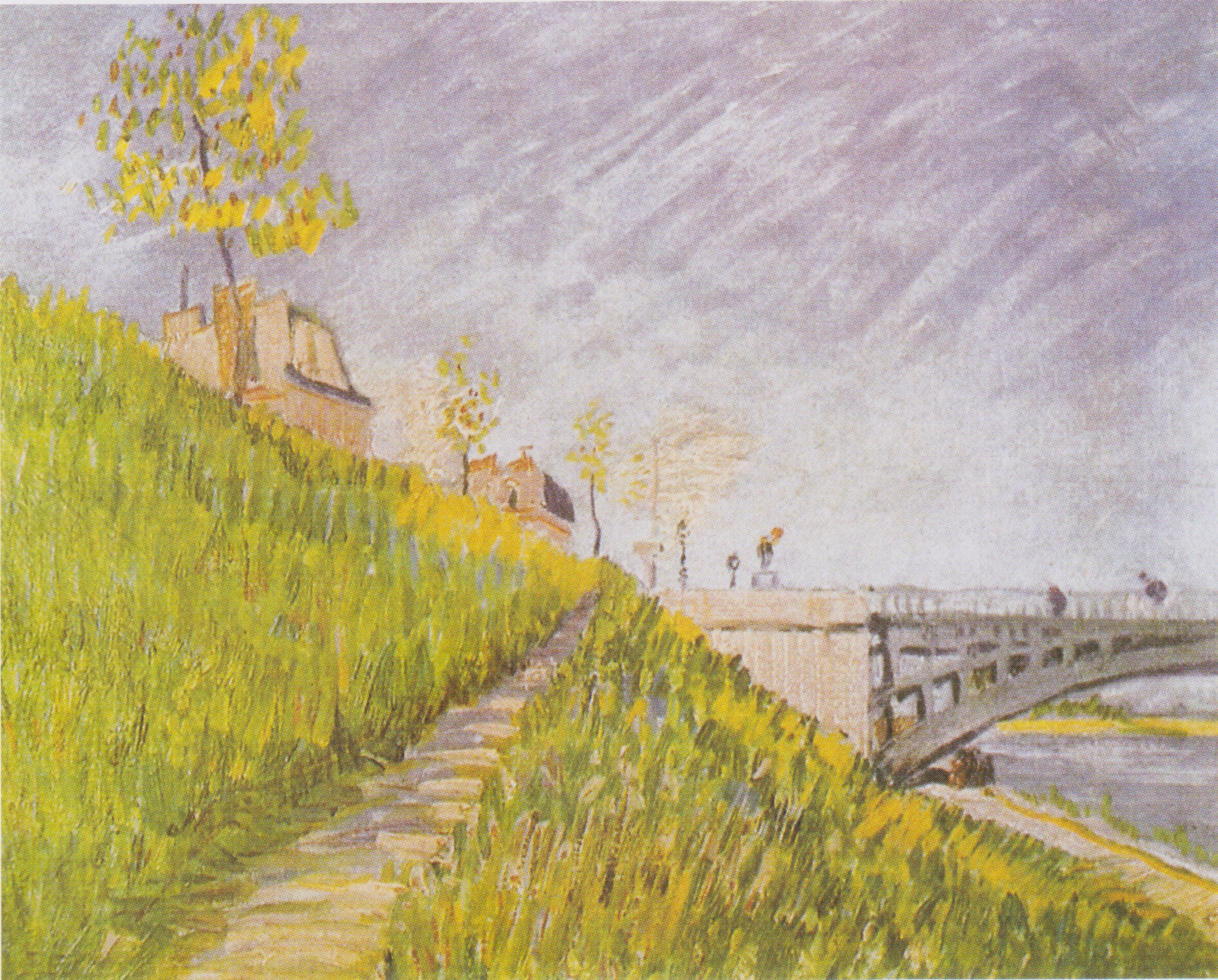
Banks of the Seine with the Pont de Clichy
1887
Courtauld Institute of Art, London (F302)

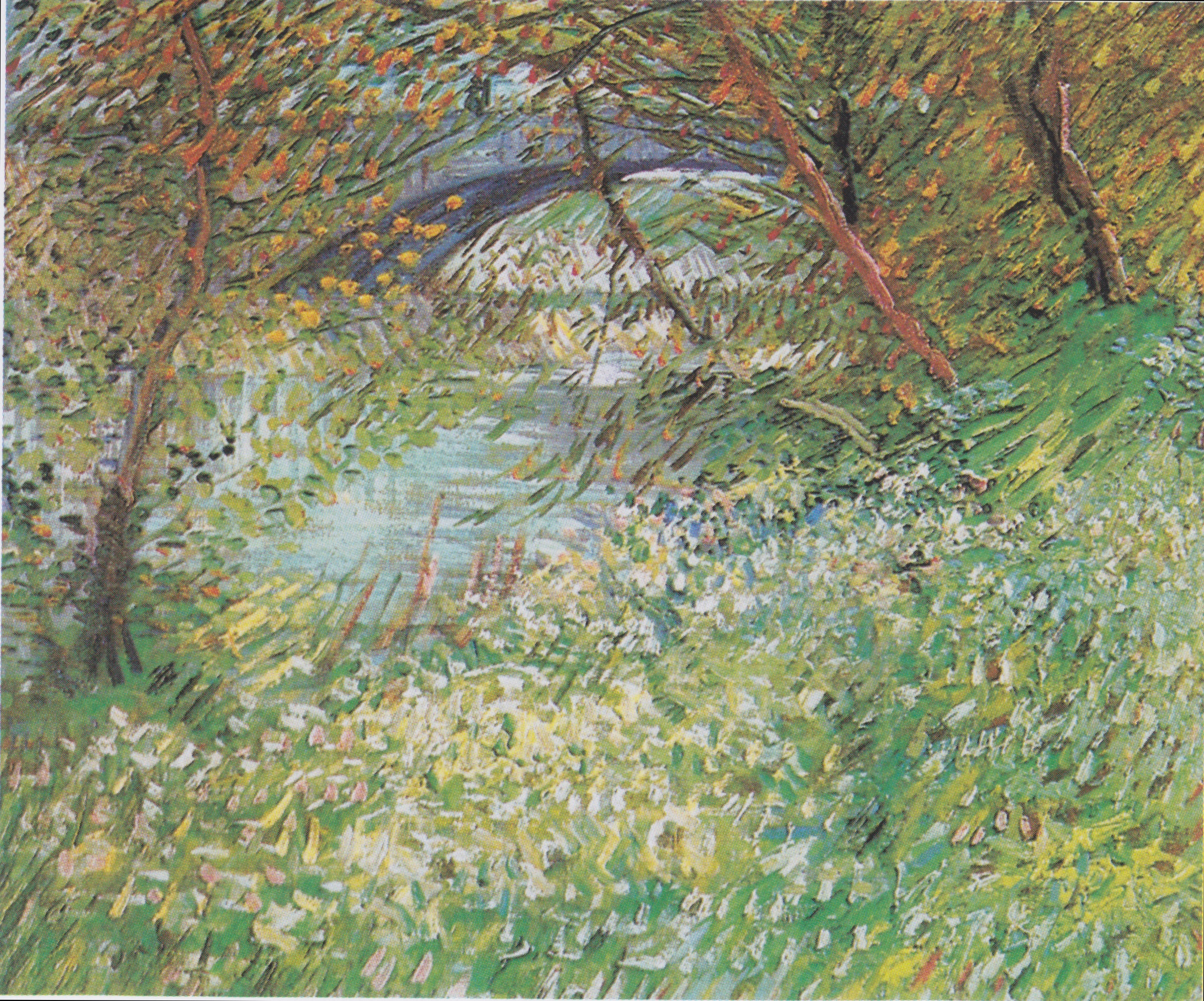
River Bank in Springtime also Banks of the Seine with the Pont de Clichy
1887
Dallas Museum of Art, Dallas, Texas (F352)

=== Asnières ===
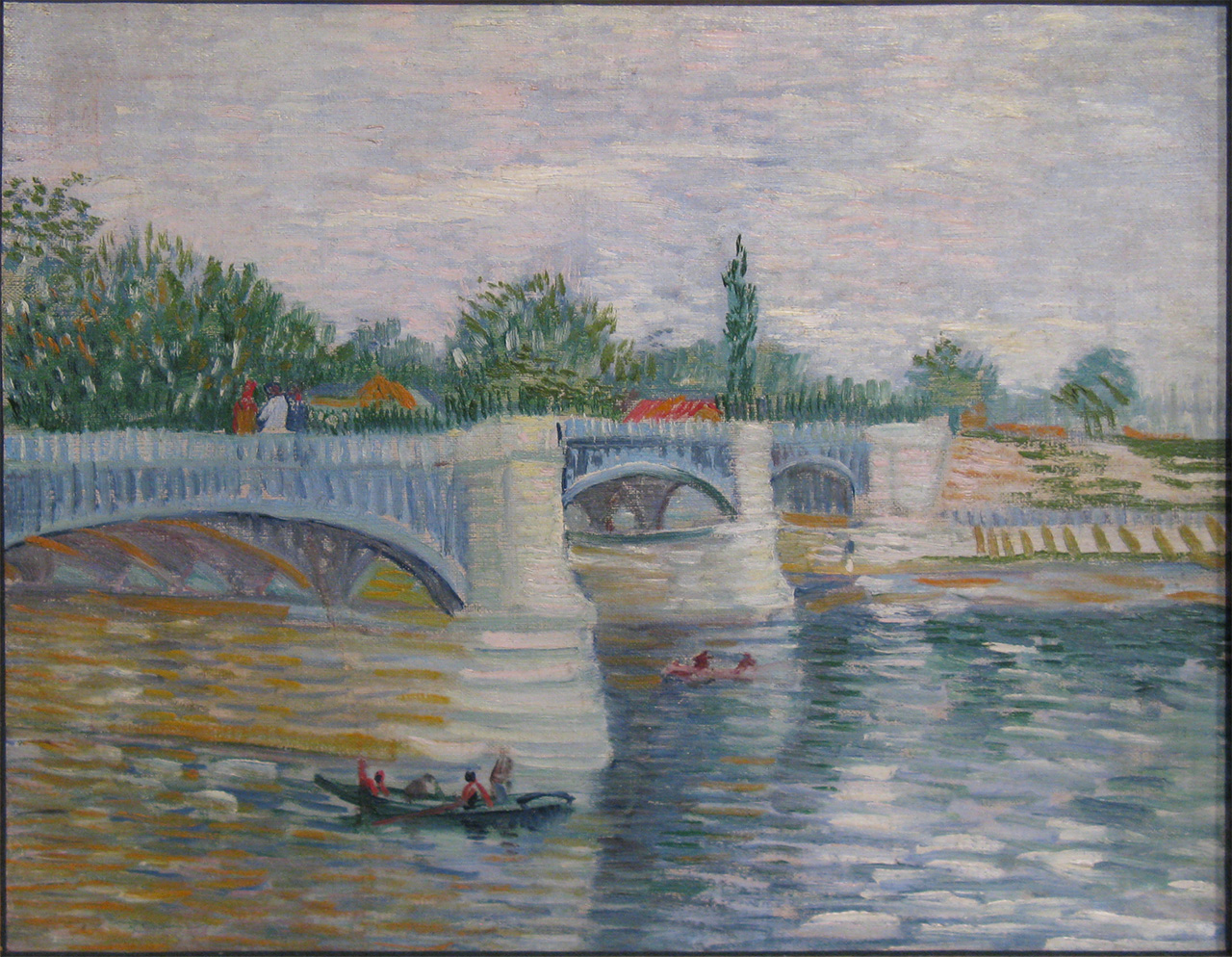
The Seine with the Pont de la Grande Jatte
Summer, 1887
Van Gogh Museum, Amsterdam (F304)

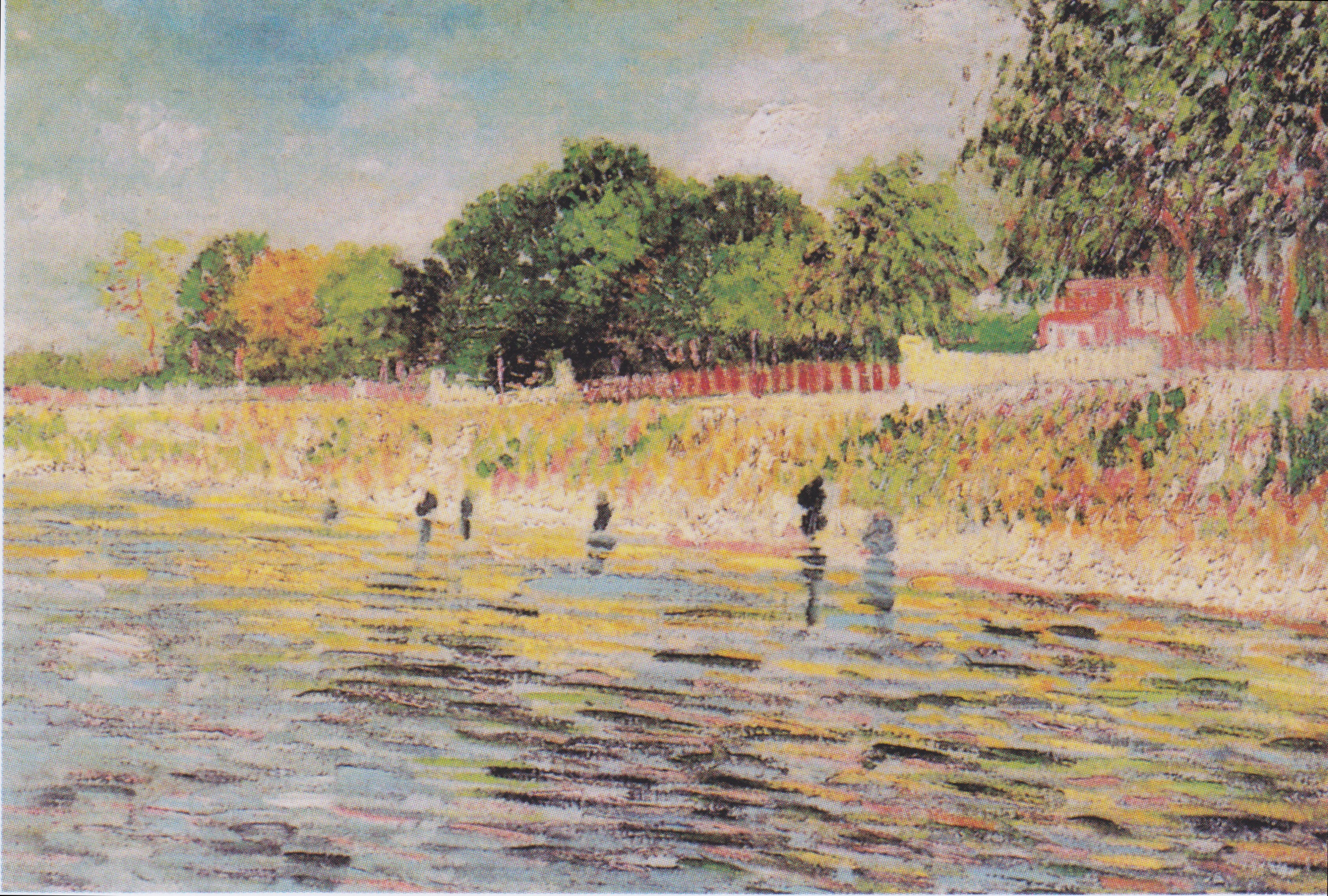
The Banks of the Seine
May–June, 1887
Van Gogh Museum, Amsterdam (F293)

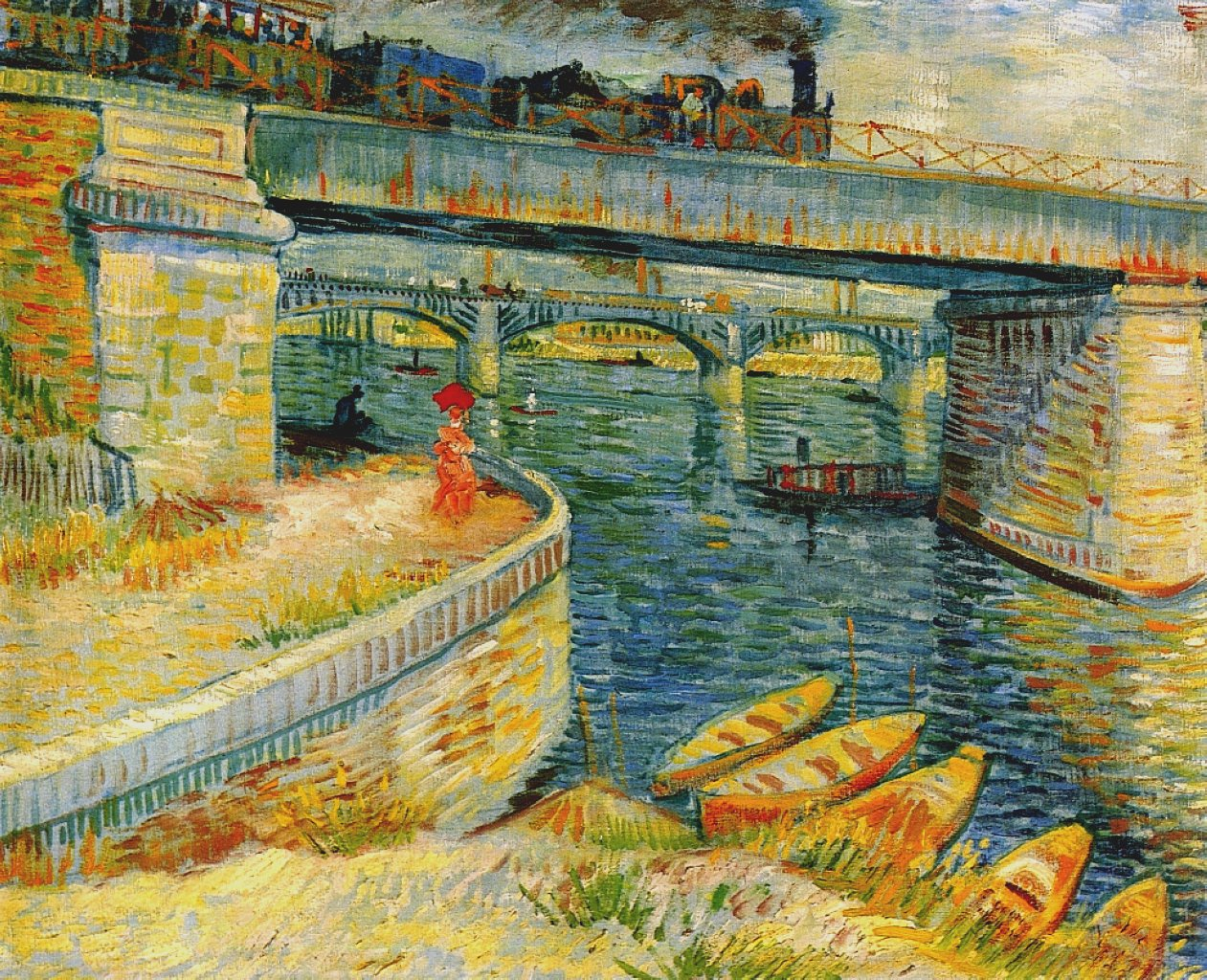
Bridges across the Seine at Asnières
Summer, 1887
Foundation E.G. Bührle, Zurich (F301)

Asnières (pronounced /a-nee-air/), now named Asnières-sur-Seine, is a town in the northern suburbs of Paris located on the banks of the Seine and near the fortifications of Paris. In the 19th century Parisians took a short train ride to Asnières for boating, including rowing meets; festivals; and the "unrestrained atmosphere" of its dances.

Van Gogh and Bernard often painted together "en plein air". Vincent wrote to his sister Wil, "While painting at Asnières, I saw more colors than I have ever seen before." Instead of working in the somber colors of his early work, van Gogh embraced the use of color and light of the Impressionists. Influenced by Impressionism and Pointillism, van Gogh modified his traditional style and used vivid color, shorter brushstrokes and perspective to engage the viewer. His views of the banks of the Seine are an important progression for his later landscape paintings. In Asnières, within walking distance of Theo's flat in Montmartre, van Gogh painted parks, cafés, restaurants and the river.

==== The Seine with the Pont de la Grande Jatte ====
The Seine with the Pont de la Grande Jatte (F304) is a painting made by van Gogh of a favored area on the Seine near Asnières. It was made during a period where he explored the use of "dots" of paint set alongside contrasting colors, influenced by Georges Seurat. In 1885 Seurat made A Sunday Afternoon on the Island of La Grande Jatte with a technique of placing colored dots on a work which led a movement called "Neo-Impressionism", "Divisionism" and "Pointillism". Van Gogh was one of the artists later called "Post-Impressionists" who was influenced by Seurat's style that rejected realism and idealism to create a new genre based upon abstraction and simplicity. Van Gogh learned from Seurat the beauty in simplicity and a means to convey messages in a more optimistic, light way than his work in the Netherlands. While he could not match Seurat's precision, aspects of Pointillism were integrated into van Gogh's work.

==== Bank of the Seine ====
In Bank of the Seine (F293) van Gogh uses Pointillism in the small dots for the trees, larger dots in the sky and dashes for water. Impressionism is harnessed to create light and reflection of the water.

==== Bridges across the Seine at Asnières ====
Bridges across the Seine at Asnières (F301) was painted in open air and bright sunlight. The scene depicts railway bridges over the river. Van Gogh uses light and reflection effectively in this painting. The stone piers of the bridge are reflected in the water and white paint is used for highlights. A woman dressed in pink with a red parasol are the focal point of the composition. The painting is part of a group of suburban landscapes along with a painting in Oxford, both of which he had placed in red frames. Van Gogh found this setting through his friend Émile Bernard whom he met when studying with Cormon. Over the two years that Van Gogh was in Paris [1886—1887] Van Gogh made several paintings of bridges crossing the Seine.

==== Walk Along the Banks of the Seine Near Asnières ====
Walk Along the Banks of the Seine Near Asnières also called Riverbank at Asnières (F299) illustrates van Gogh's technique of using "short, rapid strokes of color the capture the atmosphere of a particular place", something he used with other paintings along the Seine.

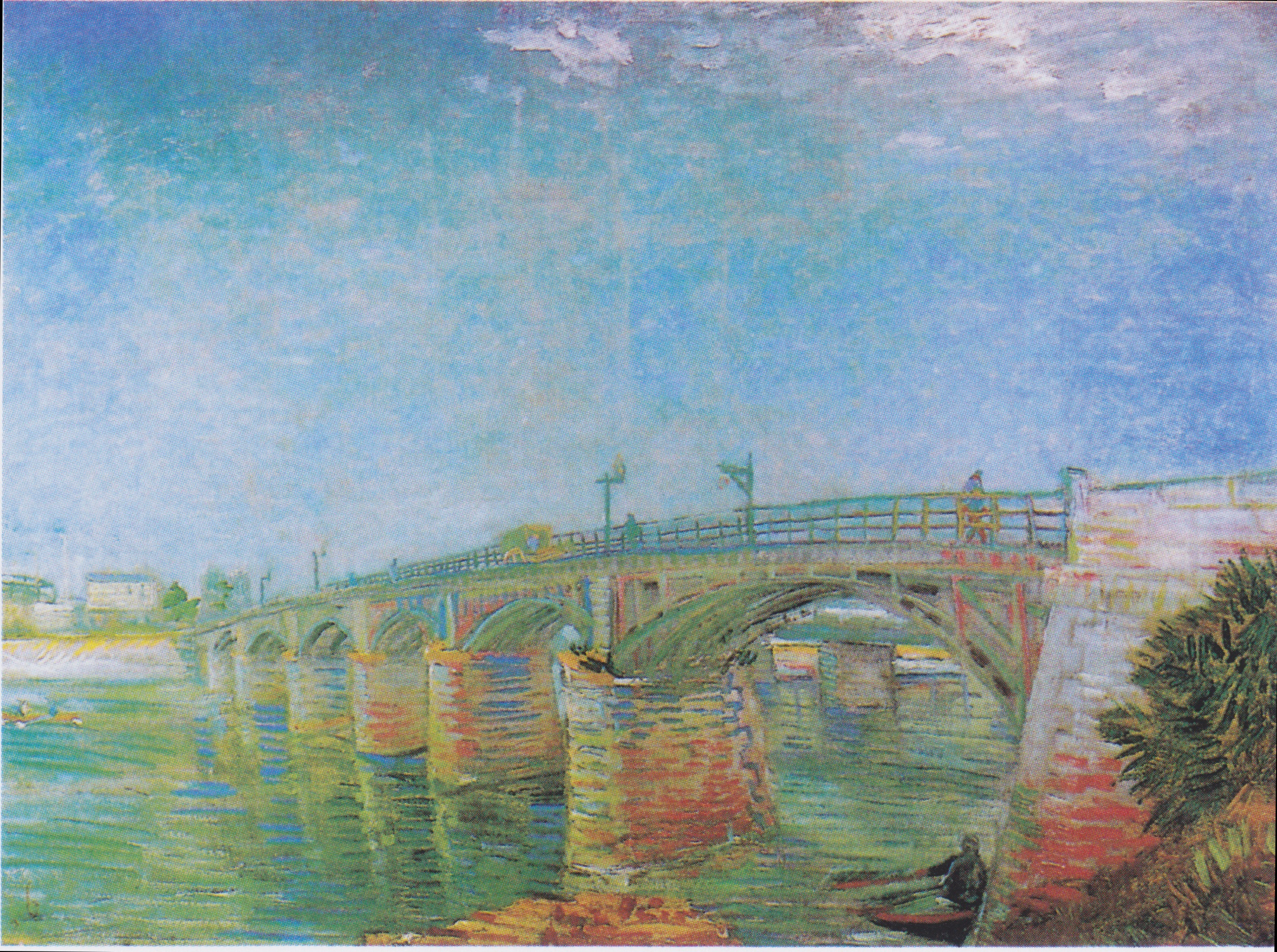
The Seine Bridge at Asnières
Summer, 1887
Private collection (F240)

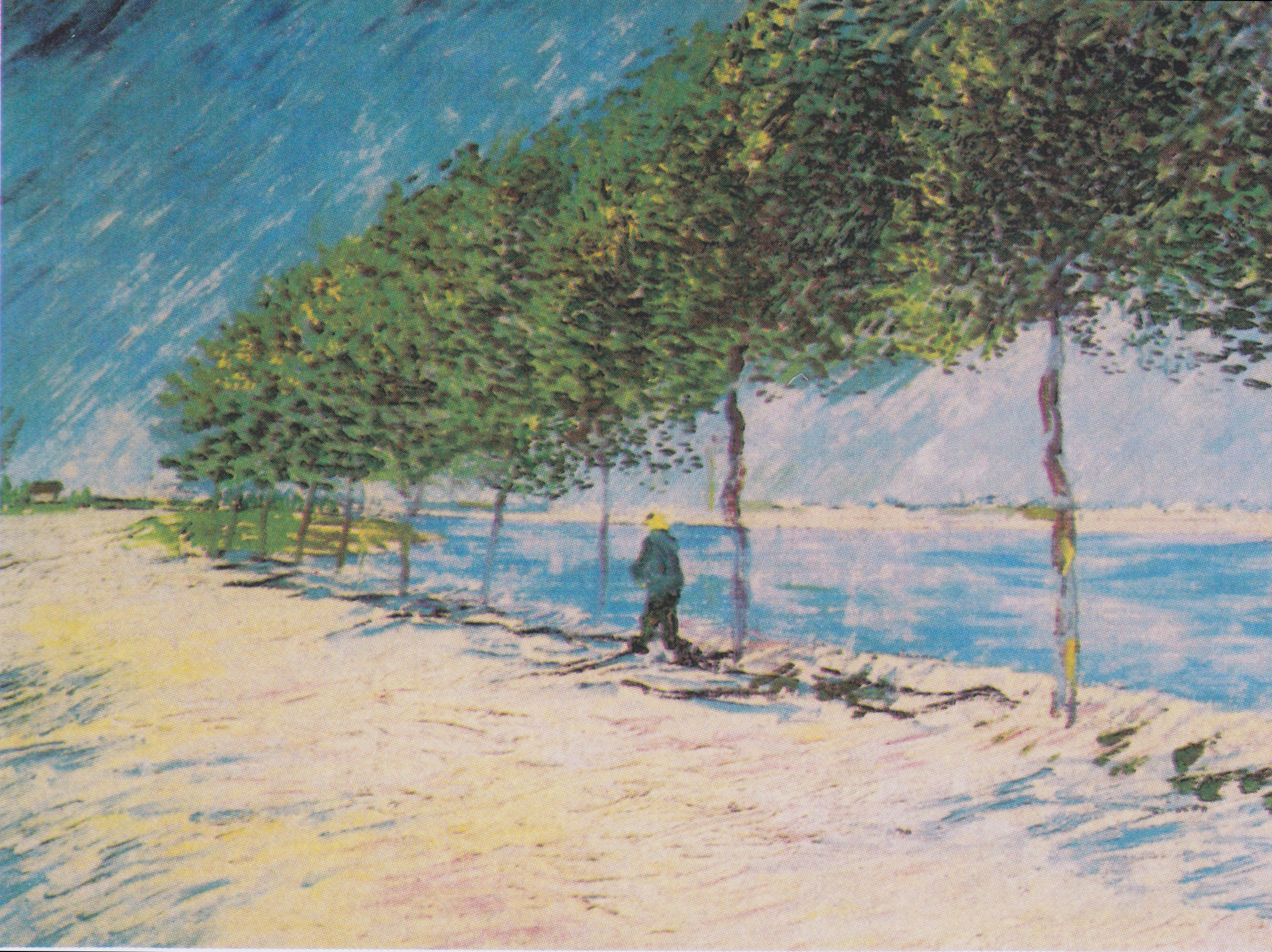
Walk Along the Banks of the Seine Near Asnières
June–July, 1887
Van Gogh Museum, Amsterdam (F299)

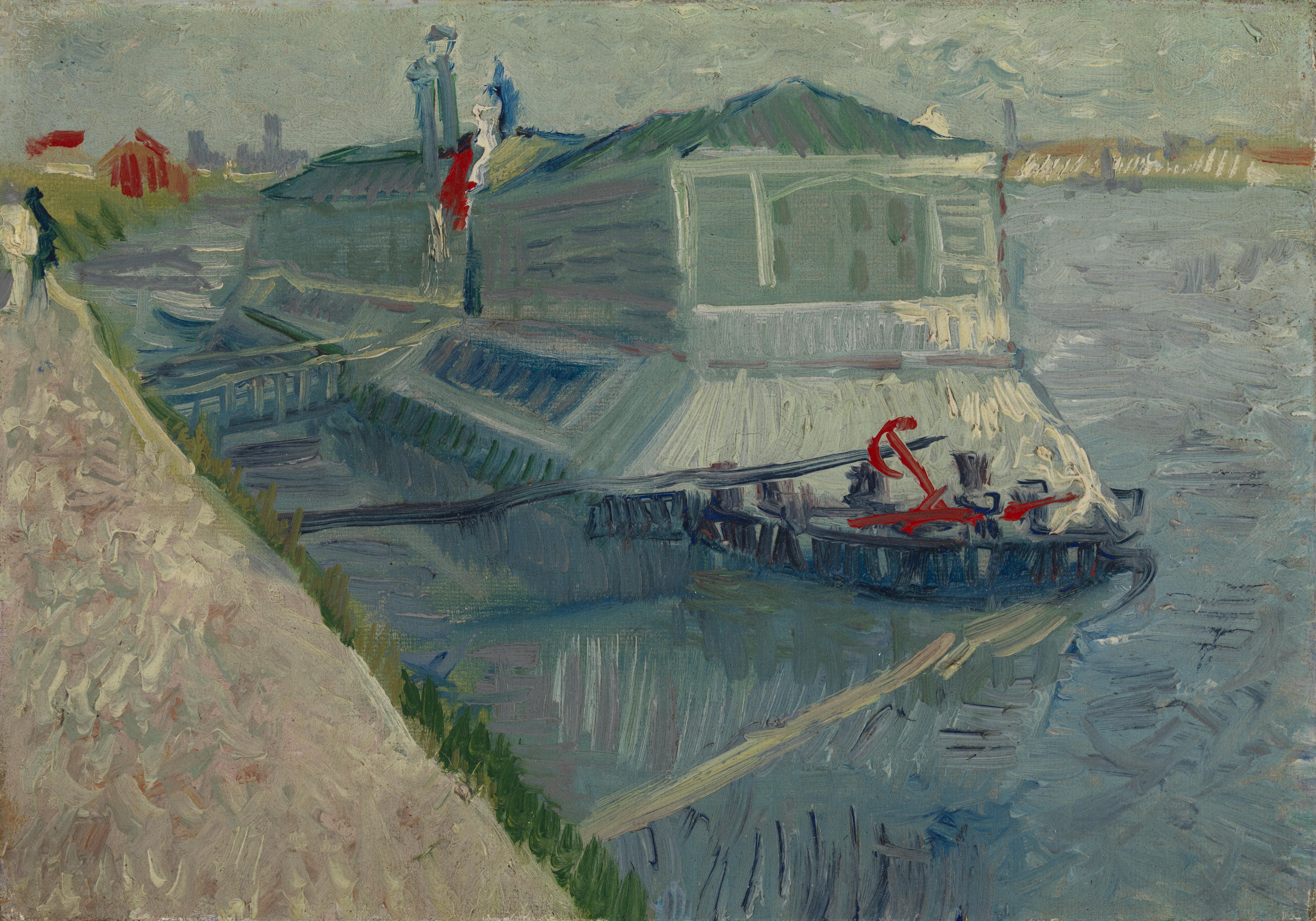
The Laundry Boat on the Seine at Asnières
Summer, 1887
Virginia Museum of Fine Arts, Richmond, Virginia (F311)

=== Row boats ===
Watercraft rowing, called "le rowing" by the French, was a sport picked up from the English and became popular by the 1880s. Clubs and competitions were established for amateur sportsmen to meet on the Seine. Van Gogh's friend John Russell was an avid participant in local competitions. In the summer of 1887 they often met at Theo's apartment on Rue Lepic where Russell was shown Vincent's paintings of boats, bridges and islands along the Seine, which with Russell's interest in rowing may have been inspiration for his paintings of the Seine at Bougival and Le Pecq.

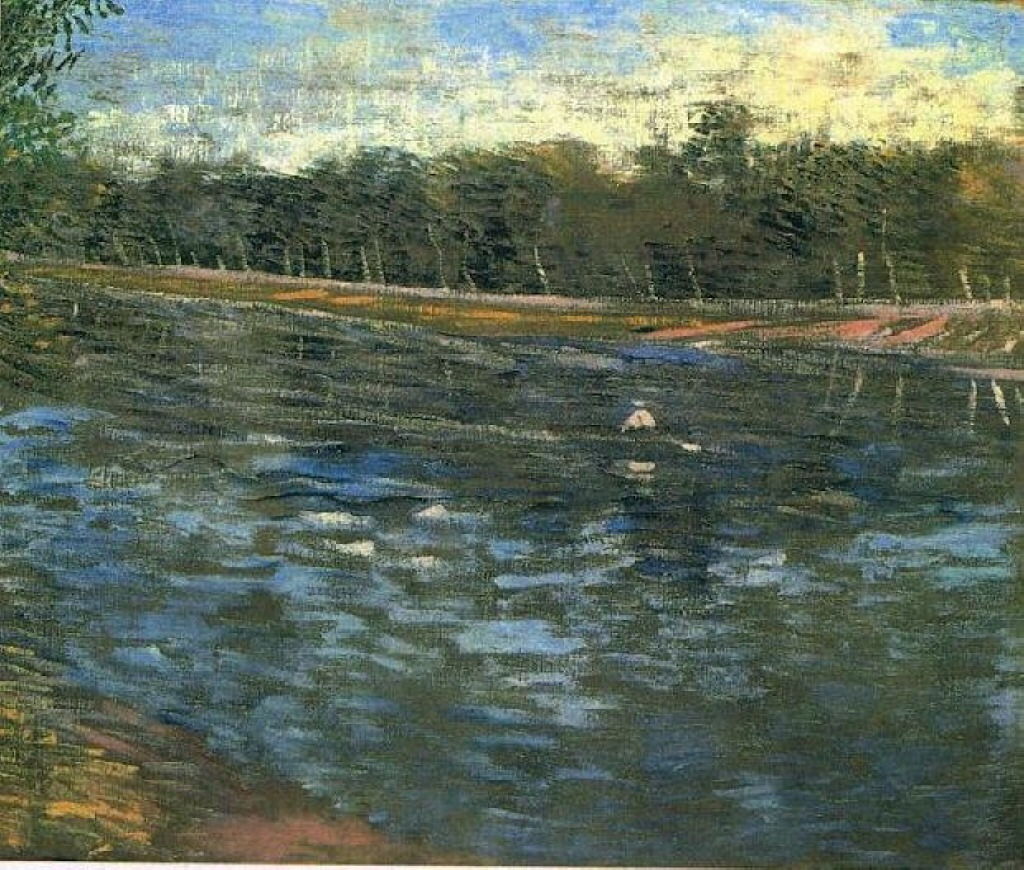
The Seine with a Rowing Boat (b/w copy)
1887
Museum of Western and Oriental Art, Kyiv (F298)

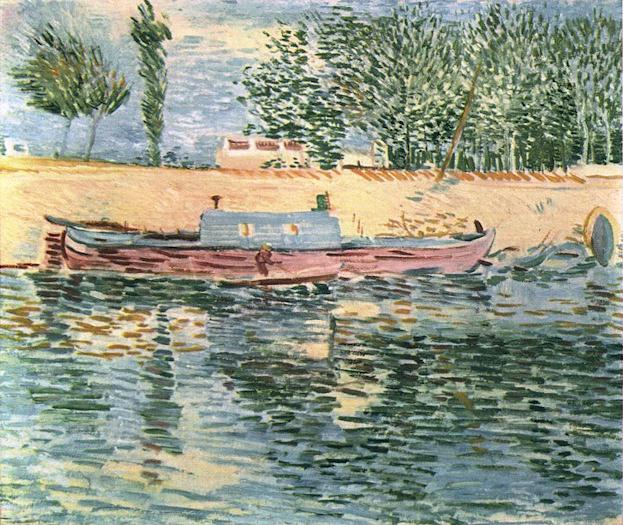
The Banks of the Seine with Boats (b/w copy)
1887
Museum of Western and Oriental Art, Kyiv (F353)

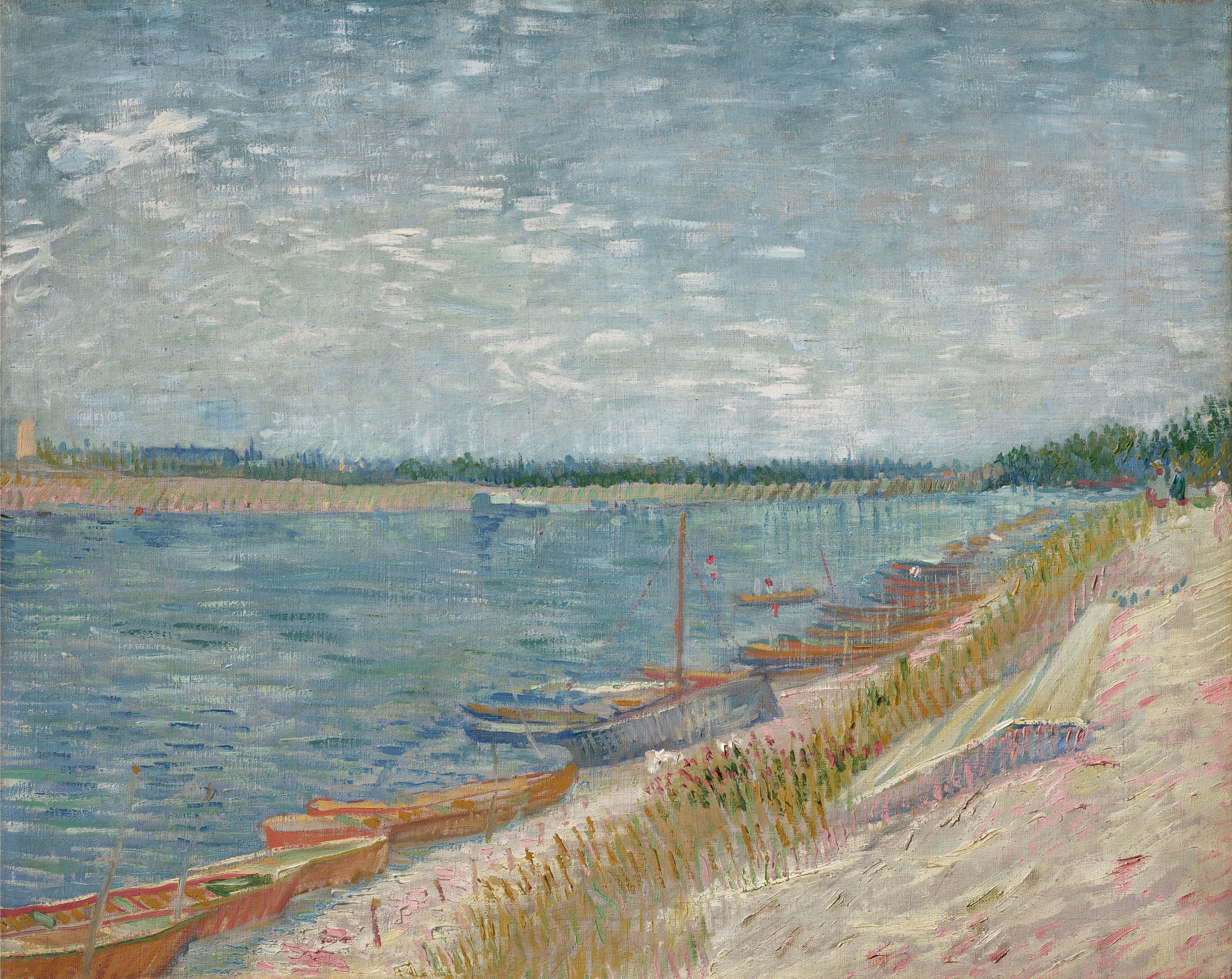
View of a River with Rowing Boats 1887 Private collection (F300)

== See also ==
- List of works by Vincent van Gogh
