= Willett (name) =

Willett is a surname of English origin. Notable people with this name include:

Many « Willetts » are actually descendants of the French-Canadian family name « Ouellet » or « Ouellette ».

== Surname ==
=== A–E ===
- Adam Willett (born 1982), American boxer
- Akito Willett (born 1988), West Indian cricketer
- Alan Willett (c. 1956–1999), American murderer
- Allan Willett (1936–2015), Lord Lieutenant of Kent
- Chad Willett (born 1971), Canadian television and film actor
- Cynthia Willett, Professor of Philosophy at Emory University
- Danny Willett (born 1987), English golfer
- Don Willett (born 1966), Supreme Court of Texas justice
- Ed Willett (1884–1934), American Major League Baseball pitcher
- Elquemedo Willett (born 1953), West Indian test cricketer
- Ernie Willett (1919–1985), English footballer

=== H–P ===
- Hurd Curtis Willett (1903–1992), American meteorologist
- Janice Willett, British television producer
- Jason Willett, American rock musician
- Jincy Willett, American author
- John Willett (1917–2002), English translator and scholar
- John B. Willett, Professor of Education at Harvard University
- Keith Willett, Professor of Orthopaedic Trauma Surgery at the University of Oxford
- Kenneth Martin Willett (1919–1942), American naval officer who died during World War II
- Lawrie Willett (born 1938), Australian public servant and university Chancellor
- Louis Willett (1945–1967), American soldier and Medal of Honor recipient
- Marcia Willett (1945-2022), British novelist
- Marinus Willett (1740–1830), American political leader and soldier during the American Revolution
- Michael J. Willett (born 1989), American actor and musician
- Mike Willett, (1933–2002), English cricketer
- Peter Willett, Professor of Information Science at the University of Sheffield, England

=== R–W ===
- Ray Willett (born 1941), Australian rules footballer
- Rodger Willett, Jr (born 1962), American compound archer
- Ron Willett (born 1944), a rugby league footballer
- Sabin Willett (born 1957), American novelist and lawyer
- Susan Somers-Willett, American poet
- Thomas Willett (1605–1674), first mayor of New York City
- Tom Willett (born 1938), American actor and YouTuber
- Tonito Willett (born 1983), West Indian test cricketer
- Walter Willett (born 1945), Professor of Epidemiology and Nutrition at the Harvard School of Public Health
- William Willett (disambiguation), multiple people, including:
  - William Willett (1856–1915), English builder and promoter of daylight saving time
  - William Willett, Jr. (1869–1938), U.S. Representative from New York (state) from 1907 to 1911
  - William Willett (Royal Navy officer) (1919–1976), an officer of the Royal Navy and Private Secretary to His Royal Highness the Duke of Edinburgh, consort of Queen Elizabeth II

== Given name ==
- Willett Main (1828–1902), American politician from Wisconsin

== See also ==
- Willetts, surname
- Willette (surname)
- Willet (disambiguation)
- Willett (disambiguation)
