= Willet (name) =

Willet is an English-language given name and surname. Notable people with the surname include:

== Given name ==
- Willet Babcock cabinetmaker, alderman, fireman, and opera house proprietor in Paris, Texas, United States
- Willet Ball (1873 – 1 June 1962) was a British journalist and political activist
- Willet Casey (1762–1848), farmer and political figure in Upper Canada
- Willet Green Miller (1867–1925), American geologist, the namesake of the Willet G. Miller Medal
- Willet M. Hays (1859–1927), American plant breeder and U.S. Assistant Secretary of Agriculture

== Surname ==
- Abraham Willet (1825–1888), Dutch art collector and amateur painter
- Andrew Willet (1562–1621), English clergyman and controversialist
- Deb Willet (1650–1678), maid of Samuel Pepys, famous for her diary which chronicled her liaison with Pepys
- Florian Willet (1977–2025), German academic, author and pro-euthanasia activist
- Gerald Willet (1934–2017), American businessman and politician
- Jennifer Willet (born 1975), Canadian artist, researcher and curator
- John Willet (1815–1889), Scottish engineer
- Samuel Walter Willet Pickup (1859–1935), Canadian farmer, merchant, shipbuilder, shipowner, and politician
- Slim Willet (1919–1966), American disc jockey, musician, and songwriter
- William Willet (1869–1921), American portrait painter, muralist, stained glass designer, studio owner and writer
- Willet brothers of Willet (band), American Christian rock band

== See also ==
- Willett (name)
- Willetts
