= Le Moulin de la Galette (Van Gogh series) =

Painting series by Vincent van Gogh

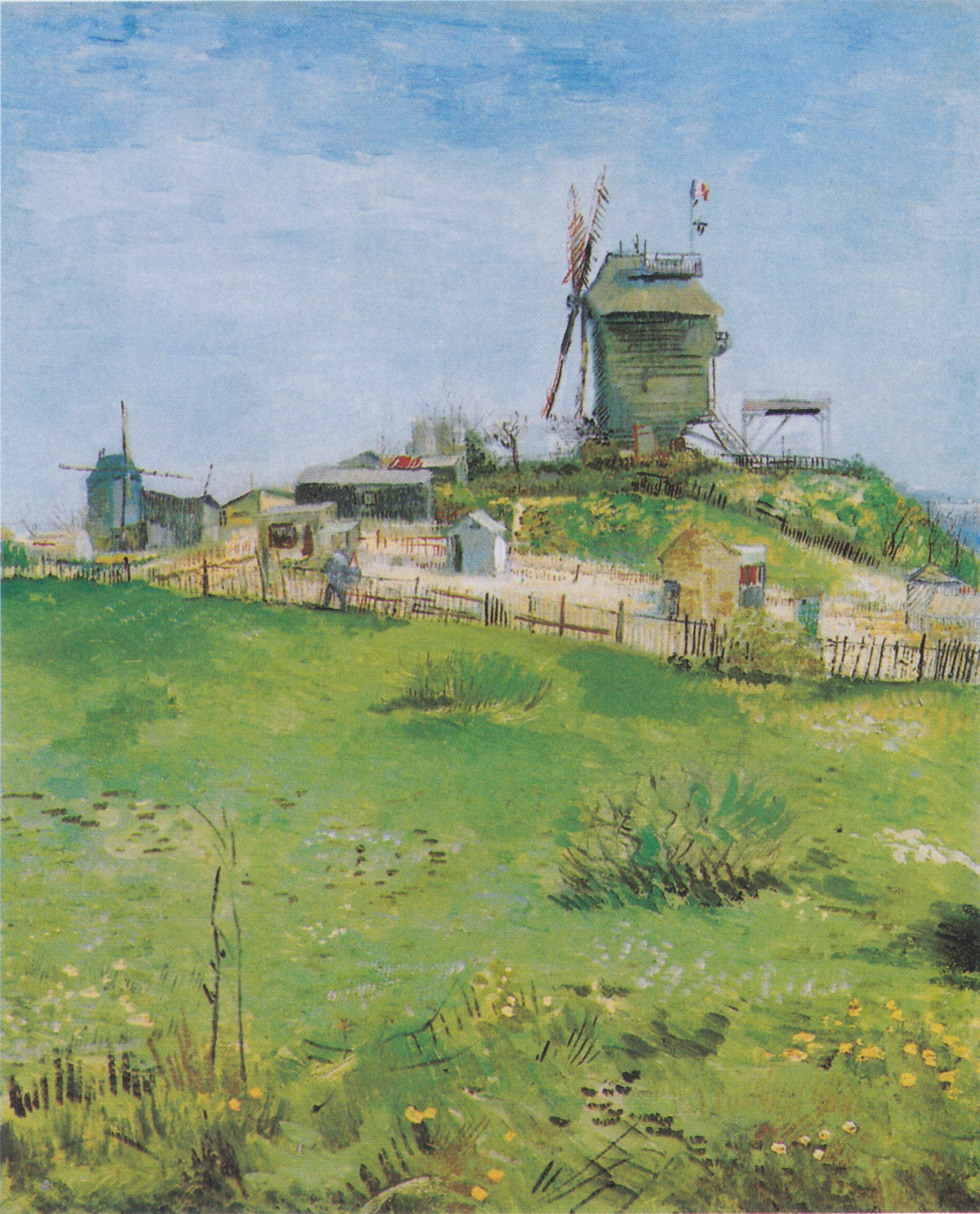
- Artist: Vincent van Gogh
- Year: 1886
- Catalogue: F348a; JH1221
- Medium: Oil on canvas
- Dimensions: 46 cm × 38 cm (18 in × 15 in)
- Location: Carnegie Museum of Art, Pittsburgh
- Website: https://collection.carnegieart.org/objects/01fd8421-c117-4309-8f99-b08b7bacec79

Le Moulin de la Galette is the title of several paintings made by Vincent van Gogh in 1886 of a windmill, the Moulin de la Galette, which was near Van Gogh and his brother Theo's apartment in Montmartre. The owners of the windmill maximized the view on the butte overlooking Paris, creating a terrace for viewing and a dance hall for entertainment.

The windmill paintings are a subset of paintings from Van Gogh's Montmartre series.

== Paris ==
In 1886 van Gogh left the Netherlands for Paris and the guidance of his brother Theo van Gogh. While van Gogh had been influenced by great Dutch masters, coming to Paris meant that he would have the opportunity to be influenced by Impressionists, Symbolists, Pointillists, and Japanese art. His circle of friends included Émile Bernard, Paul Gauguin, Camille Pissarro, Henri de Toulouse-Lautrec, Paul Vogler and others.

Montmartre, a butte overlooking Paris, was known for its bars, cafes, and dance-hall. It was also located on the edge of countryside that afforded van Gogh the opportunity to work on paintings of rural settings while living in Paris.

The landscape and windmills around Montmartre were the source of inspiration for a number of van Gogh's paintings. Moulin de la Galette, the windmill still mounted over the moved establishment, is located near the apartment that van Gogh shared with his brother Theo from 1886 until 1888. Built in 1622, it was originally called Blute-Fin and belonged to the Debray family in the 19th century. Van Gogh met artists such as Toulouse-Lautrec, Paul Signac and Paul Gauguin who inspired him to incorporate Impressionism into his artwork. Among other things, this resulted in lighter, more colorful works of art.

Moulin de la Galette was also the name of an outdoor dance hall that was located between two of the last windmills on a Montmartre hilltop. In addition to van Gogh, Toulouse-Lautrec and Pierre-Auguste Renoir also painted Moulin de la Galette. Renoir's painting of the dance hall is titled Bal du moulin de la Galette.

== The paintings ==
=== Three paintings with similar compositions ===
In van Gogh's first year in Paris he painted rural areas around Montmartre, such as the butte and its windmills. The colors were sometimes somber, and evoke a sense of his anxiety and loneliness, while other paintings were bright and evoked an enthusiastic intense nature.

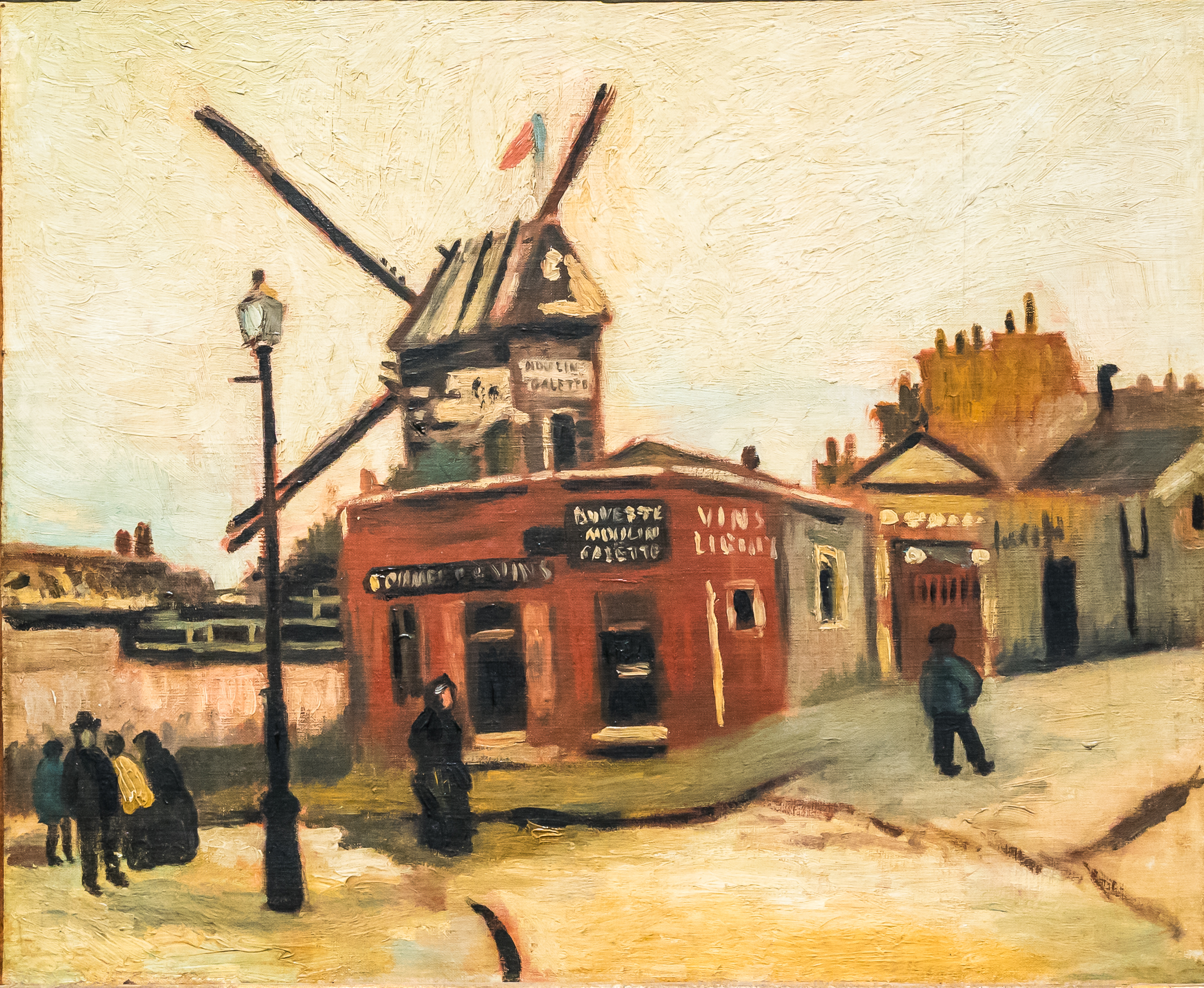
Le Moulin de la Galette
1886
Stiftung Langmatt, Baden, Switzerland (F226)

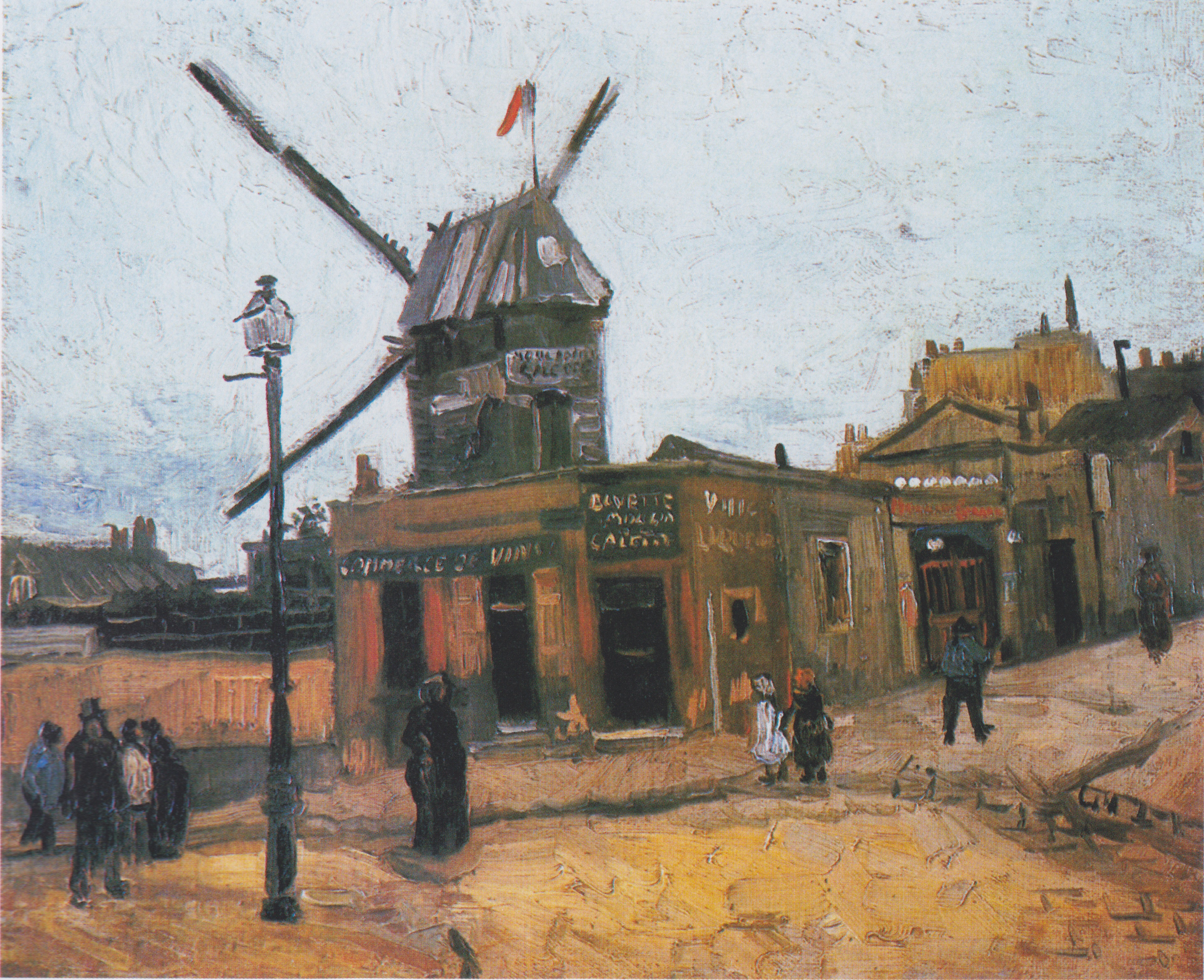
Le Moulin de la Galette
1886
Kröller-Müller Museum, Otterlo, Netherlands (F227)

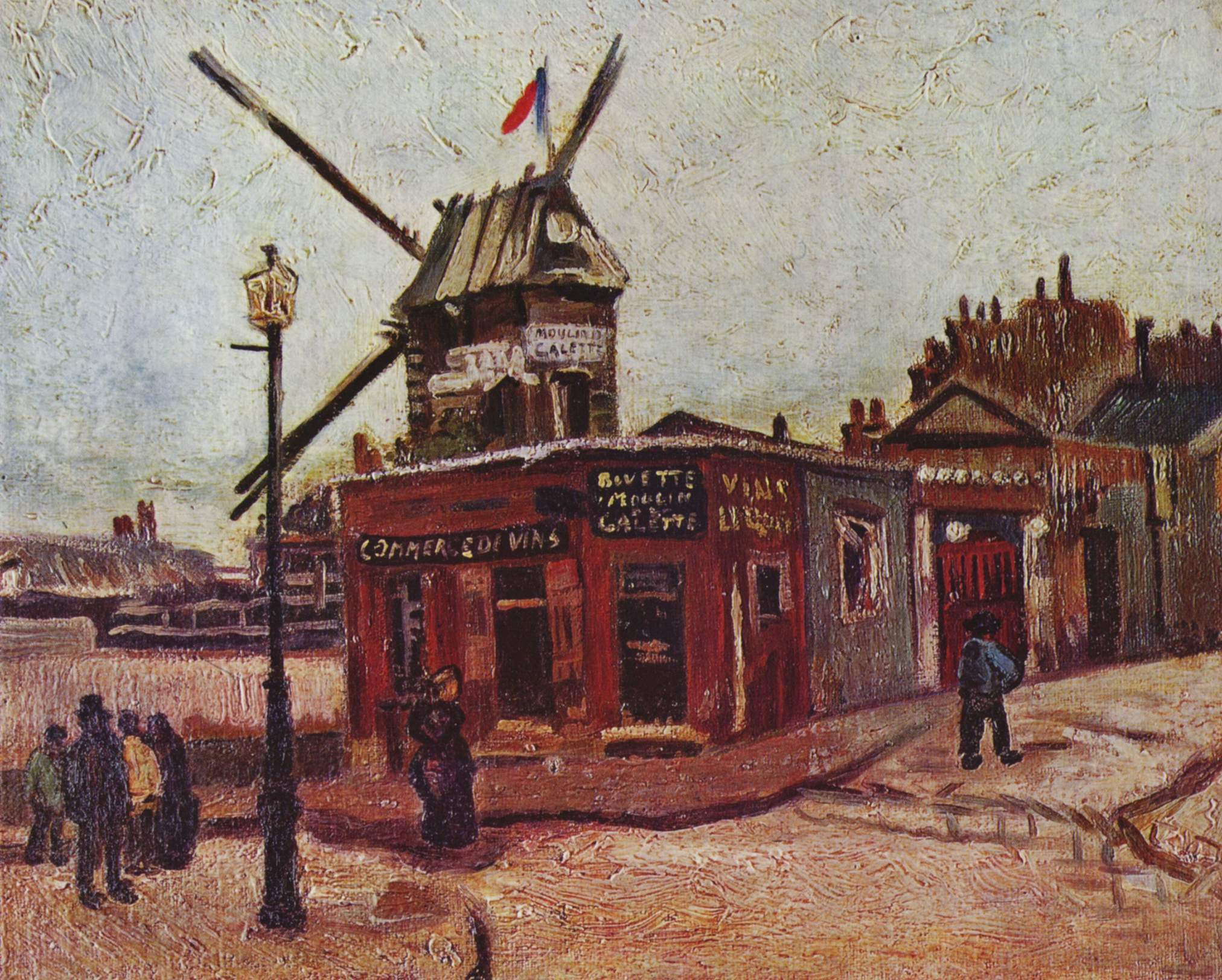
Le Moulin de la Galette
1886
Alte Nationalgalerie, Berlin (F228)

=== Other paintings titled Le Moulin de la Galette ===
Le Moulin de la Galette, also called The Blute-Fin Windmill, Montmartre (F274) reflects van Gogh's artistic transition from his work in the Netherlands which was somber and heavy. Influenced by Impressionism, van Gogh's painted this work with lighter colors and unrestrained brushstrokes to capture light and movement. Van Gogh made the painting from an empty lot on rue Lepic, the street in which he lived with Theo. The painting features the Moulin de Blute-Fin, a 17th-century grain-mill, which was an attraction for its views of Paris. At this time there were three windmills on the butte, but this was the windmill van Gogh favored as a subject for his paintings. Moulin a Poivre, a second windmill, is just inside the left frame of the painting on the horizon. The painting was sold by Scottish art dealer Alex Reid to William McInnes and with van Gogh's Portrait of Alexander Reid is in the collection of Glasgow Museums.

Le Moulin de la Galette (F348) is an example how van Gogh used a technique for heavily applying paint called impasto that it created a relief effect, partly to convey emotion. The brushstrokes in the windmill and doorsteps are noticeable. The faces of the two people were created with just a couple of brushstrokes.

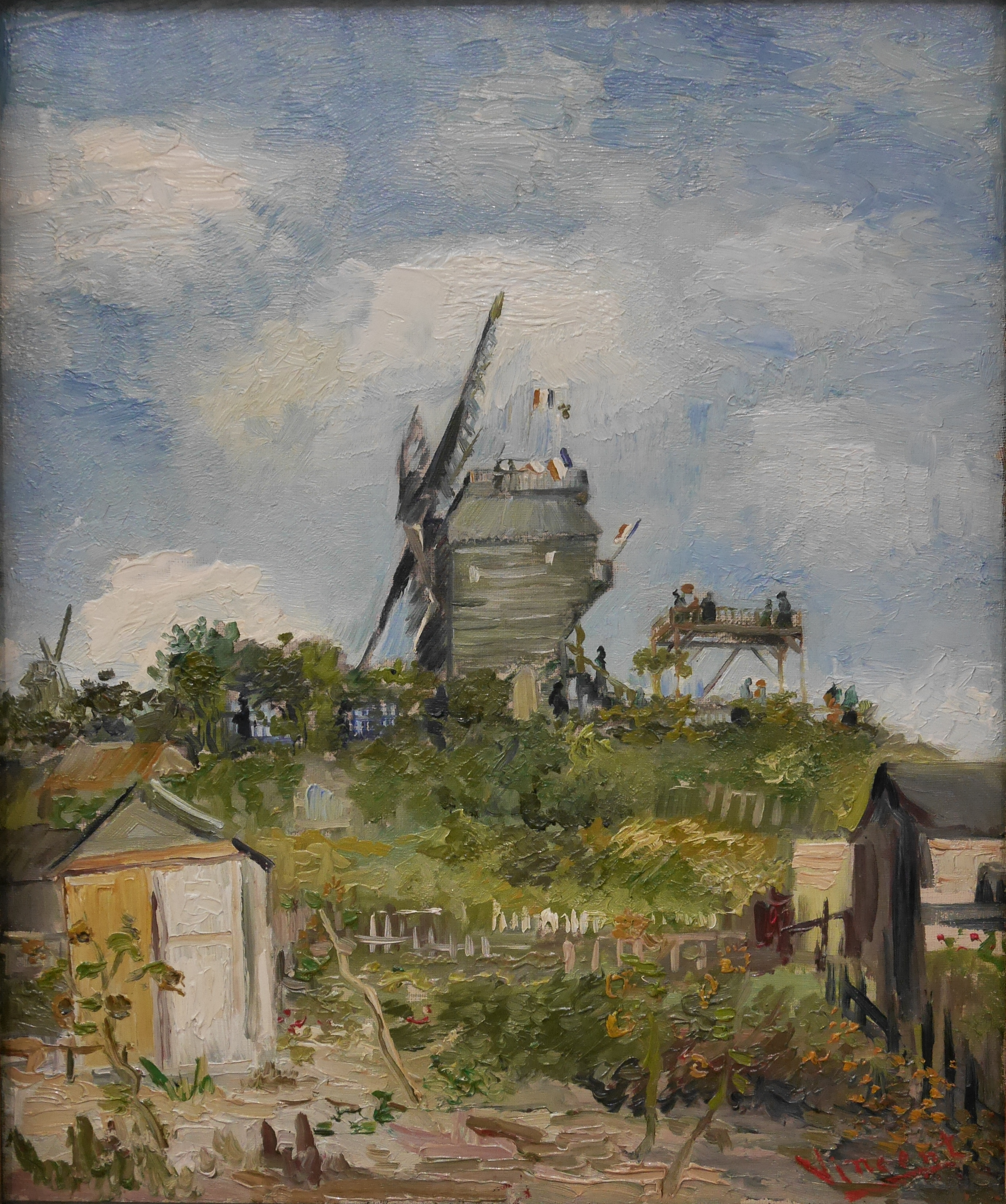
Le Moulin de la Galette also The Blute-Fin Windmill, Montmartre
1886
Kelvingrove Art Gallery and Museum, Glasgow (F274)

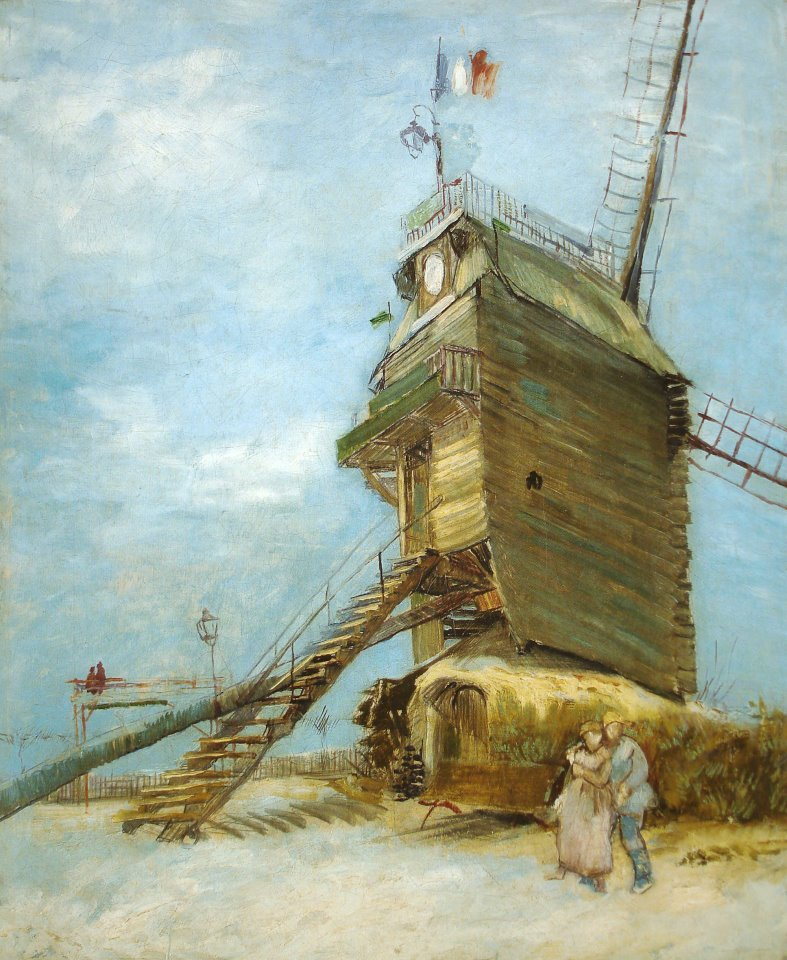
Le Moulin de la Galette
1886
Museo Nacional de Bellas Artes, Buenos Aires, Argentina (F348)

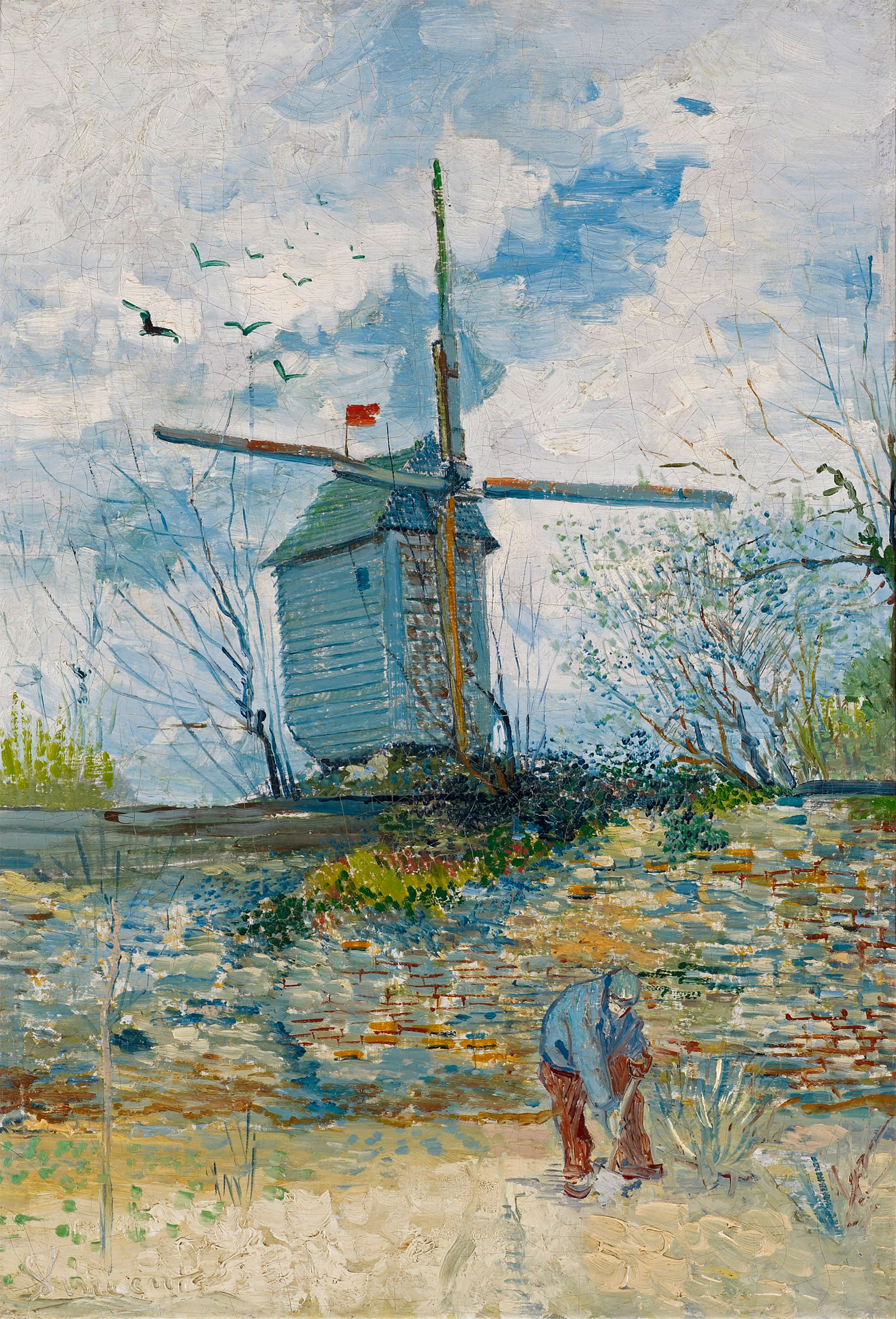
Le Moulin de la Galette
1886
Private collection (F349)

== Blute-Fin windmill paintings ==
In addition to Le Moulin de la Galette (F274), which is also named The Blute-Fin Windmill, Montmartre, there are several other paintings with the name Blute-Fin.

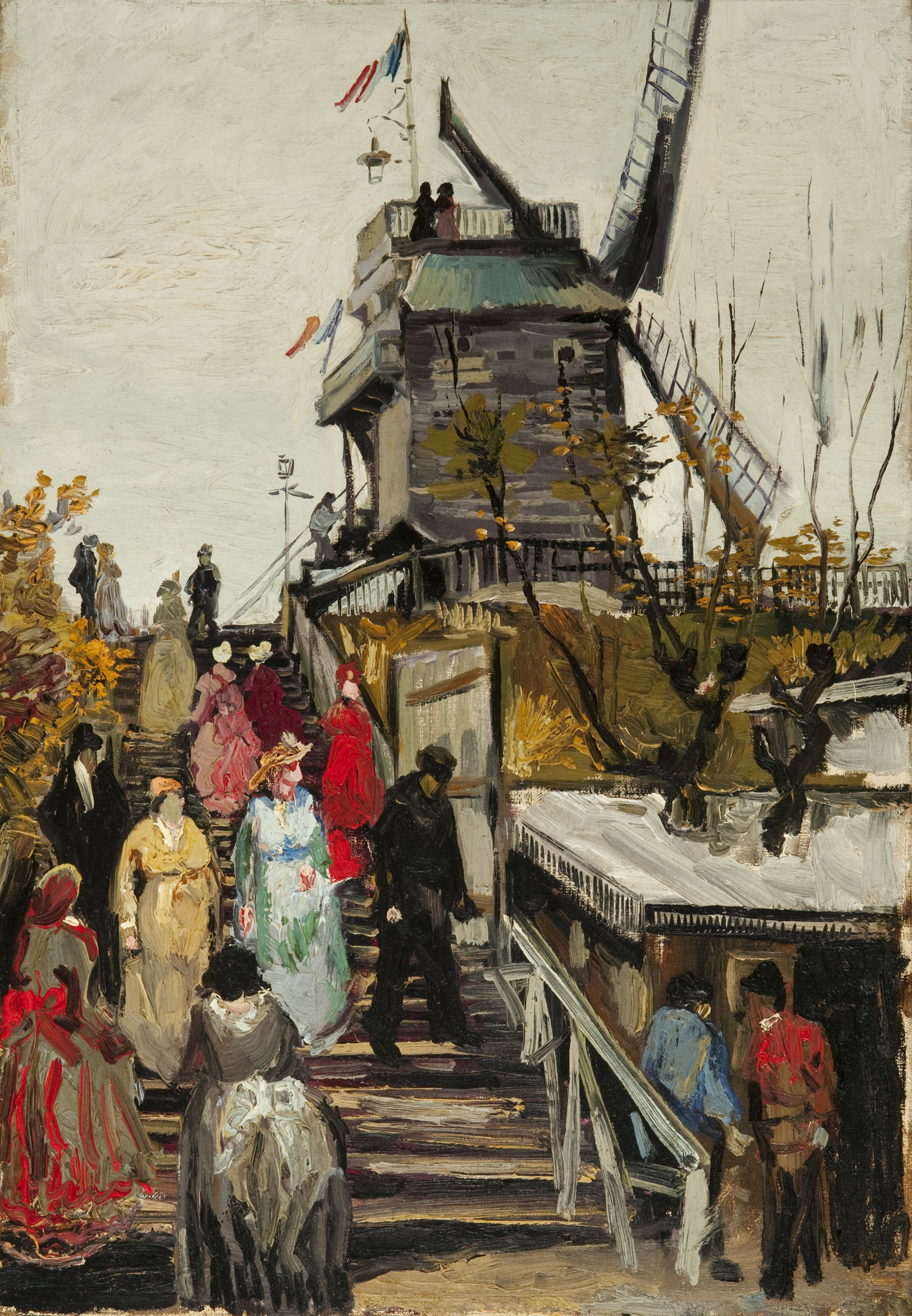
Le Moulin de blute-fin, 1886, Museum de Fundatie, Zwolle

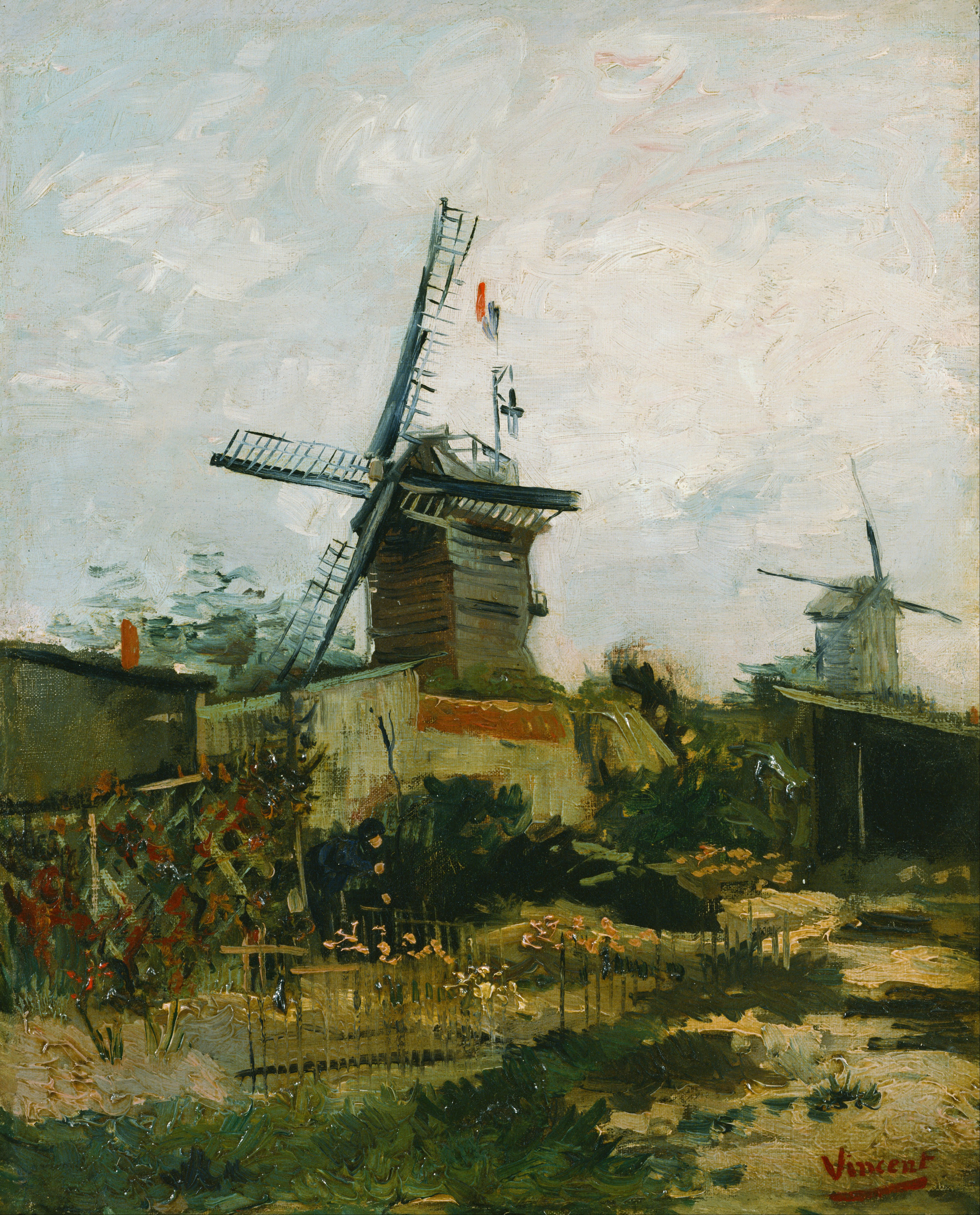
Le Moulin de Blute-Fin, 1886, Bridgestone Museum of Art, Tokyo (F273)

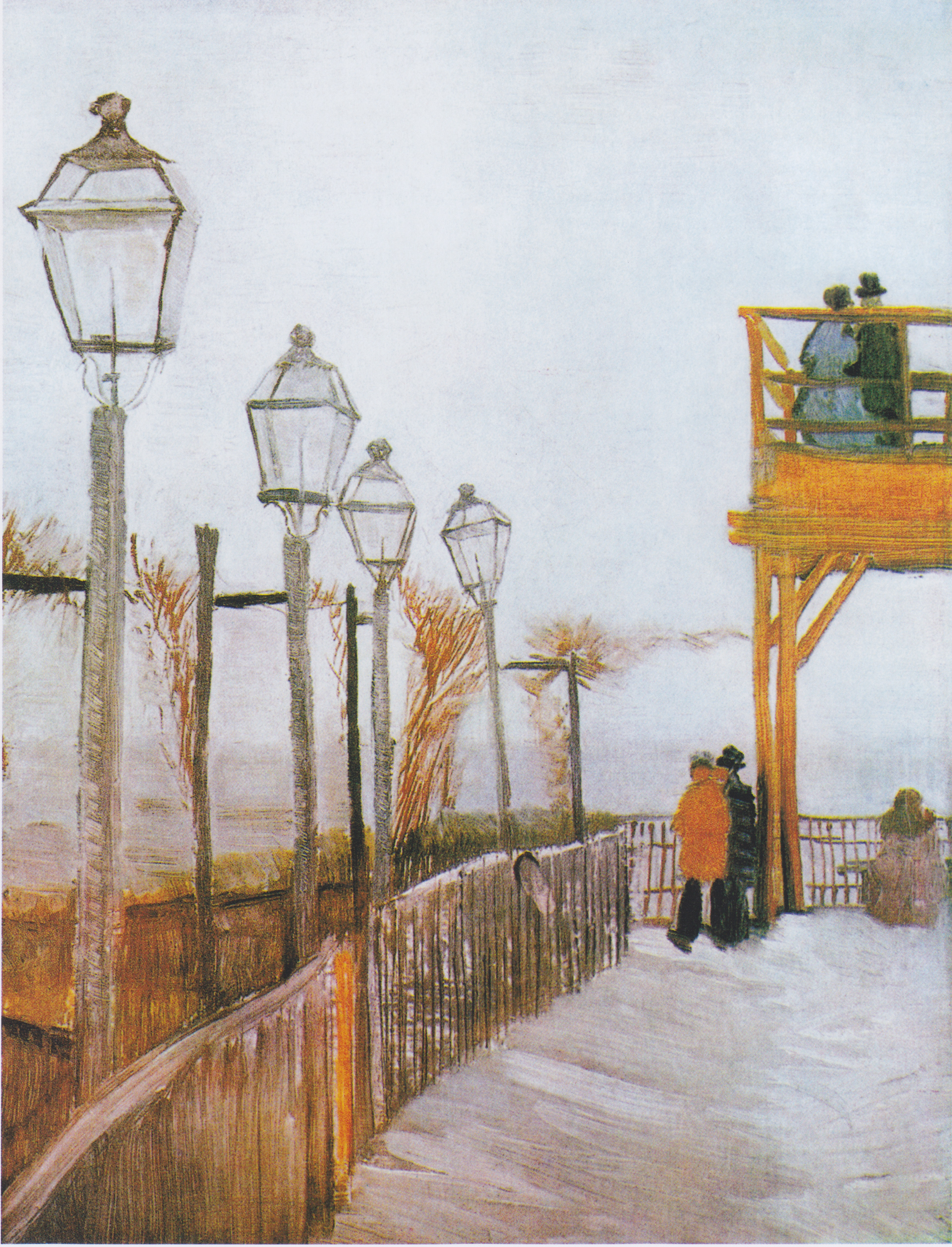
Terrace and Observation Deck at the Moulin de Blute-Fin, Montmartre, 1886, Art Institute of Chicago(F272)

== Other windmill paintings ==
Here are the images of paintings from van Gogh's period in Paris that include windmills:

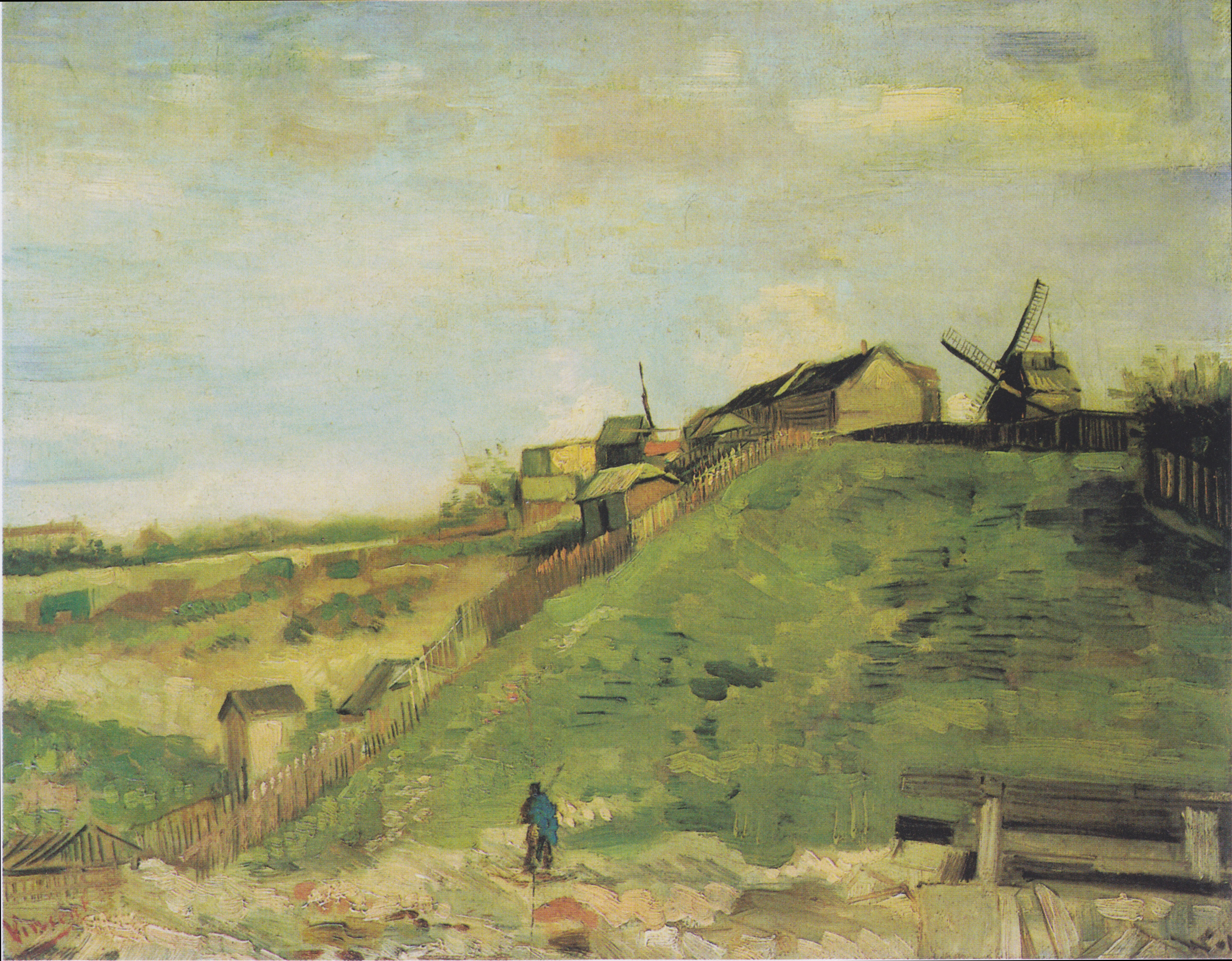
The Hill of Montmartre with Stone Quarry
1886
Van Gogh Museum, Amsterdam (F229)

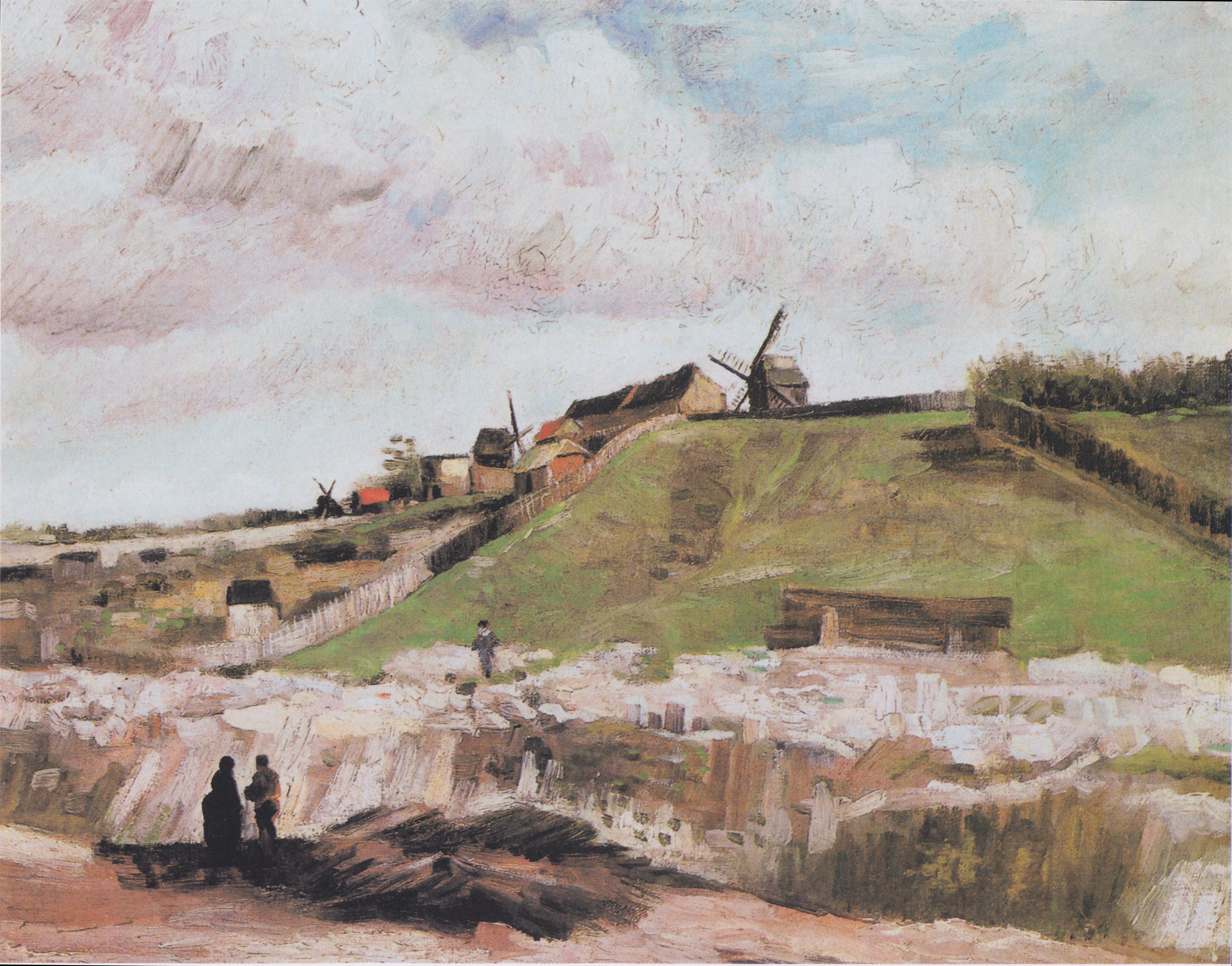
The Hill of Montmartre with Quarry
1886
Van Gogh Museum, Amsterdam (F230)

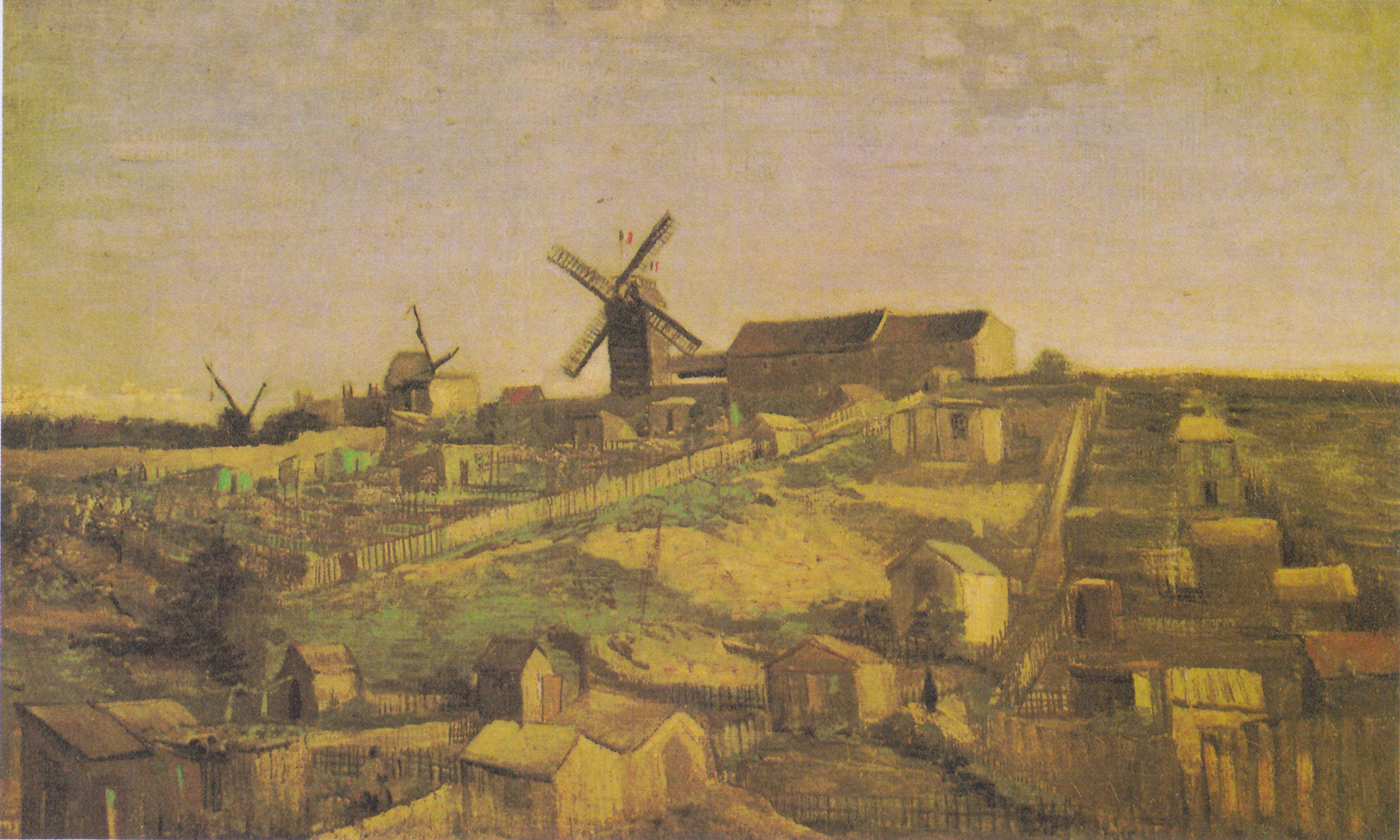
The Hill of Montmartre also View of Montmartre with Windmills
1886
Kröller-Müller Museum, Otterlo, Netherlands (F266)

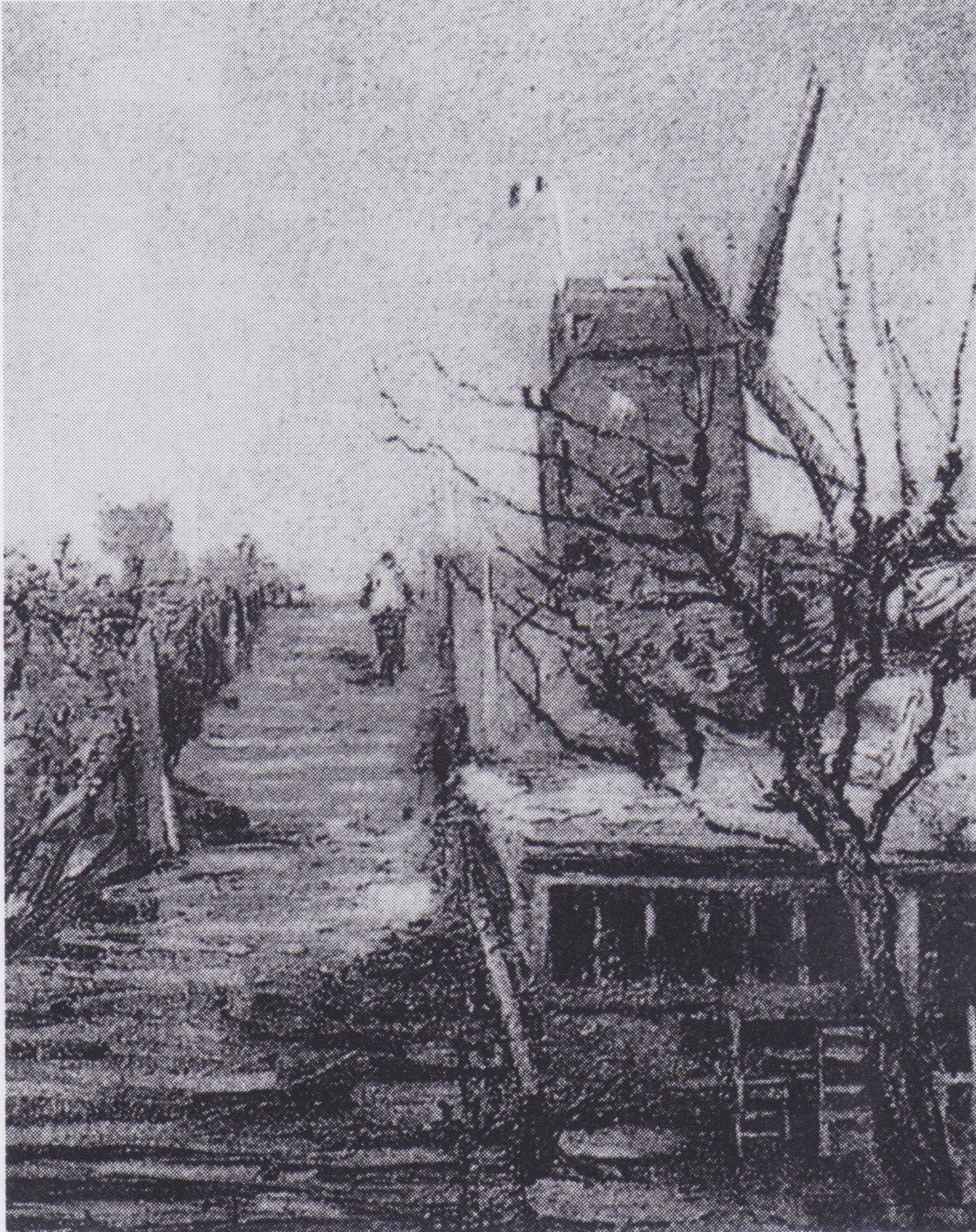
Windmill on Montmartre (b/w copy)
1886
Destroyed by fire in 1967 (F271)

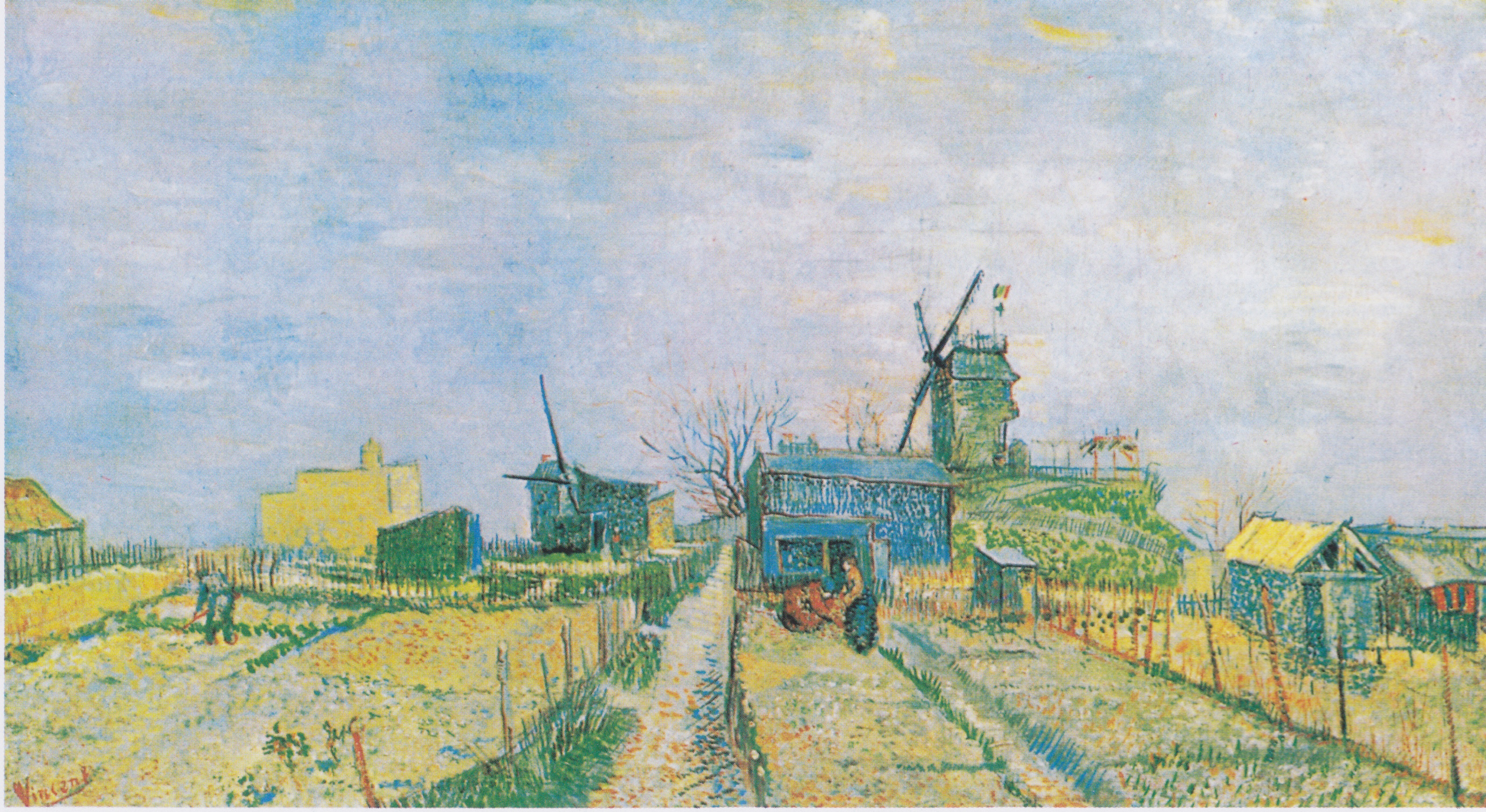
Vegetable Gardens in Montmartre: La Butte Montmartre
1887
Van Gogh Museum, Amsterdam (F346)

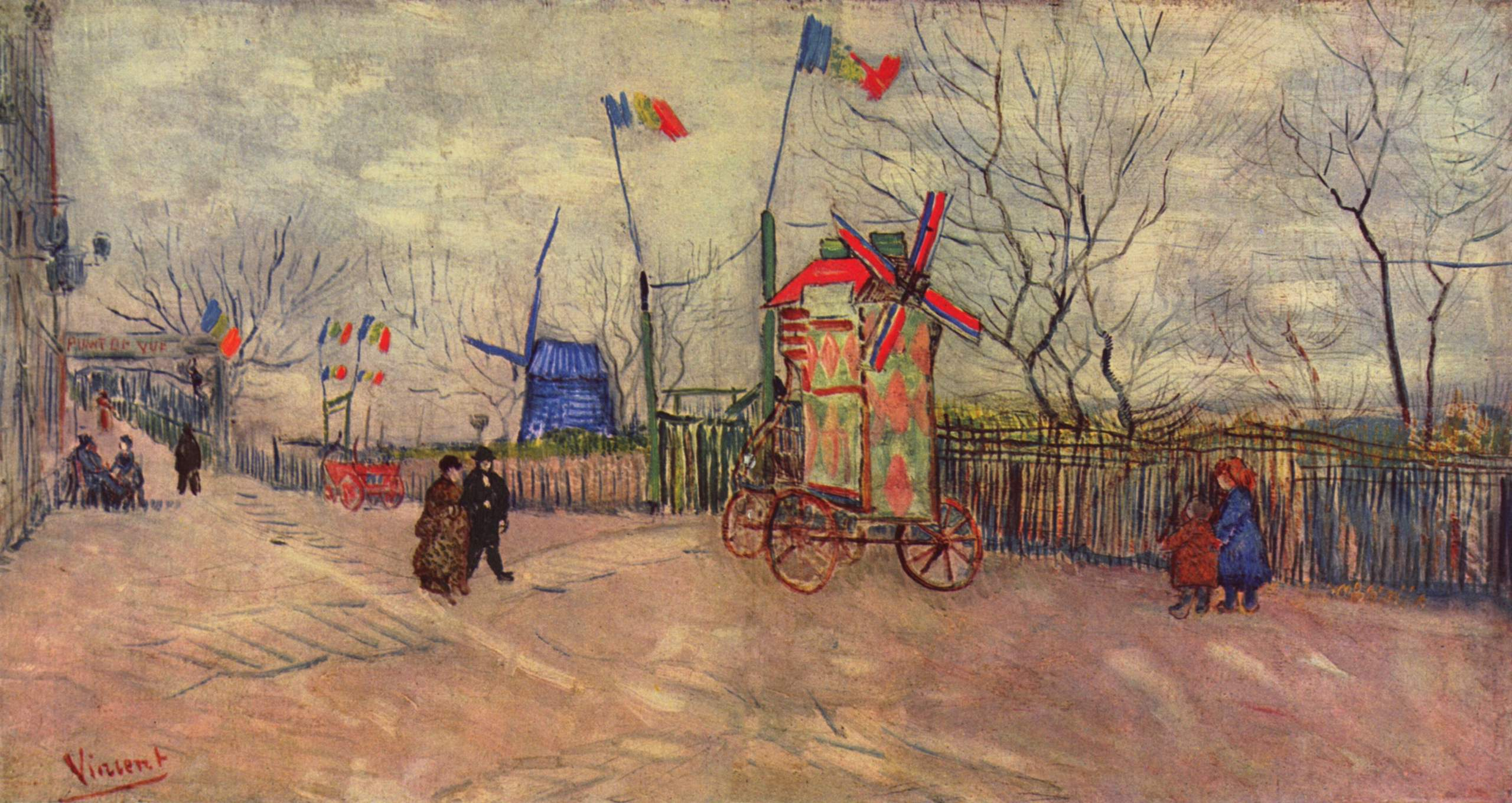
Street Scene in Montmartre: Le Moulin a Poivre
1887
Van Gogh Museum, Amsterdam (F347)

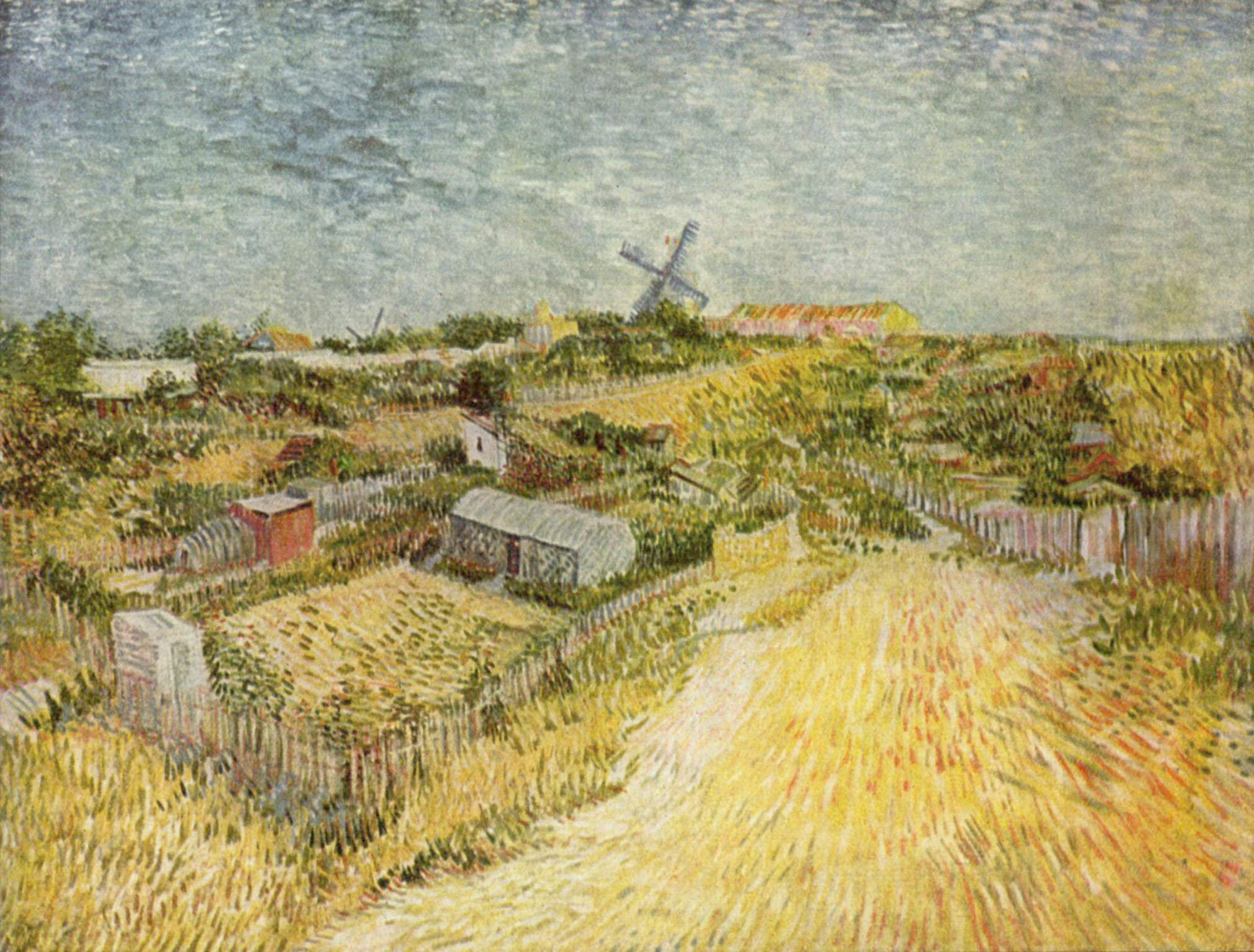
Vegetable Gardens in Montmartre: La Butte Montmartre
1887
Stedelijk Museum, Amsterdam (F350)

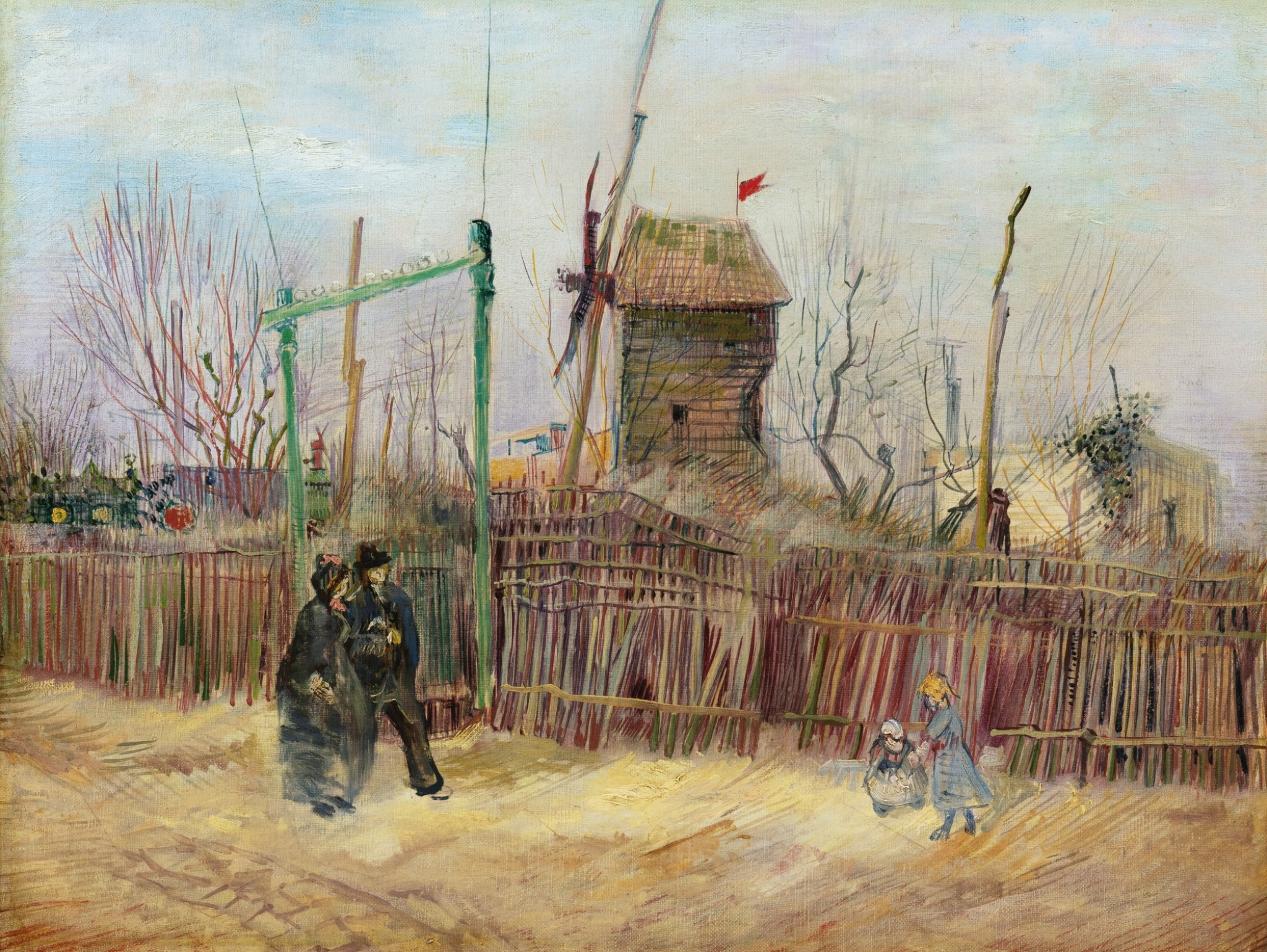
Street Scene in Montmartre
1887
Private collection (No F number, JH1240)

== See also ==
- List of works by Vincent van Gogh
