= Willette (surname) =

Willette is a surname. Notable people with the surname include:

- Adolphe Willette (1857–1926), French painter, illustrator, caricaturist and lithographer
- Alexander Willette (born 1989), American politician
- Baby Face Willette (1933–1971), American hard bop and soul-jazz musician
- Doris Willette (born 1988), American foil fencer
- Jeff Willette, American animator
- JoAnn Willette (born 1963), American actress
- Leonard R. Willette (1921–1944), Tuskegee Airman
- Michael Willette, American politician
- Robert Willette, American politician

== Other uses ==
- Willette, Tennessee
- Willette Kershaw (1882–1960), American stage actress

== See also ==
- Willett (name)
- Willetts, surname
- Willet (disambiguation)
- Willett (disambiguation)
