= Willette =

Willette may refer to:

- Willette (surname),
- Willette, Tennessee, an unincorporated community
- Willette Kershaw, an American actress

== See also ==
- Willett
