= Paul Vogler =

French painter

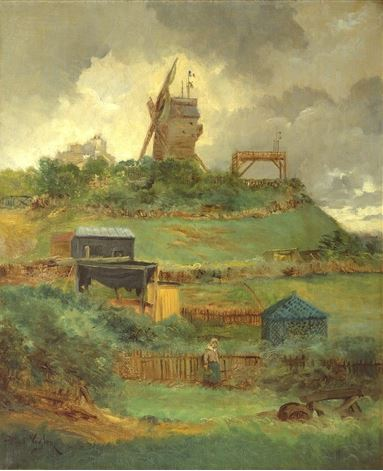
The Moulin de la Galette

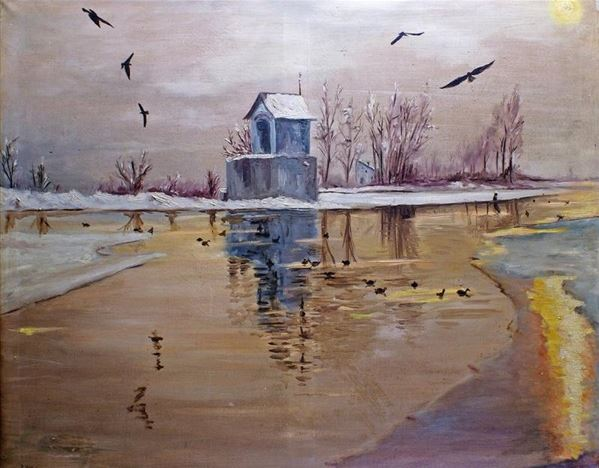
River Banks in the Snow

Paul Vogler (8 March 1853 – 17 December 1904) was a French painter in the Impressionist style, known mostly for his landscapes.

== Biography ==
Vogler was born in Paris. He was initially self-taught and did decorative work. Later, he was able to polish his technique when Alfred Sisley met him, became his mentor, and had a major influence on his style. He mostly painted landscapes in Le Midi, Brittany, Oise and the rural areas around Paris, at different seasons and times of day, to capture variations in the effects of light.

Thanks to his advice and urgings, Le Barc de Boutteville, dealers in classic art, became interested in contemporary painters and began offering their works in 1891. In 1893, commissioned by the poet, Tola Dorian, he painted the sets for Pelléas et Mélisande by Maurice Maeterlinck, in a production by Lugné-Poe In 1899, he had his largest exhibit at the gallery of Ambroise Vollard.

Despite his success, he was apparently rather profligate and died in poverty, in Verneuil-sur-Seine.

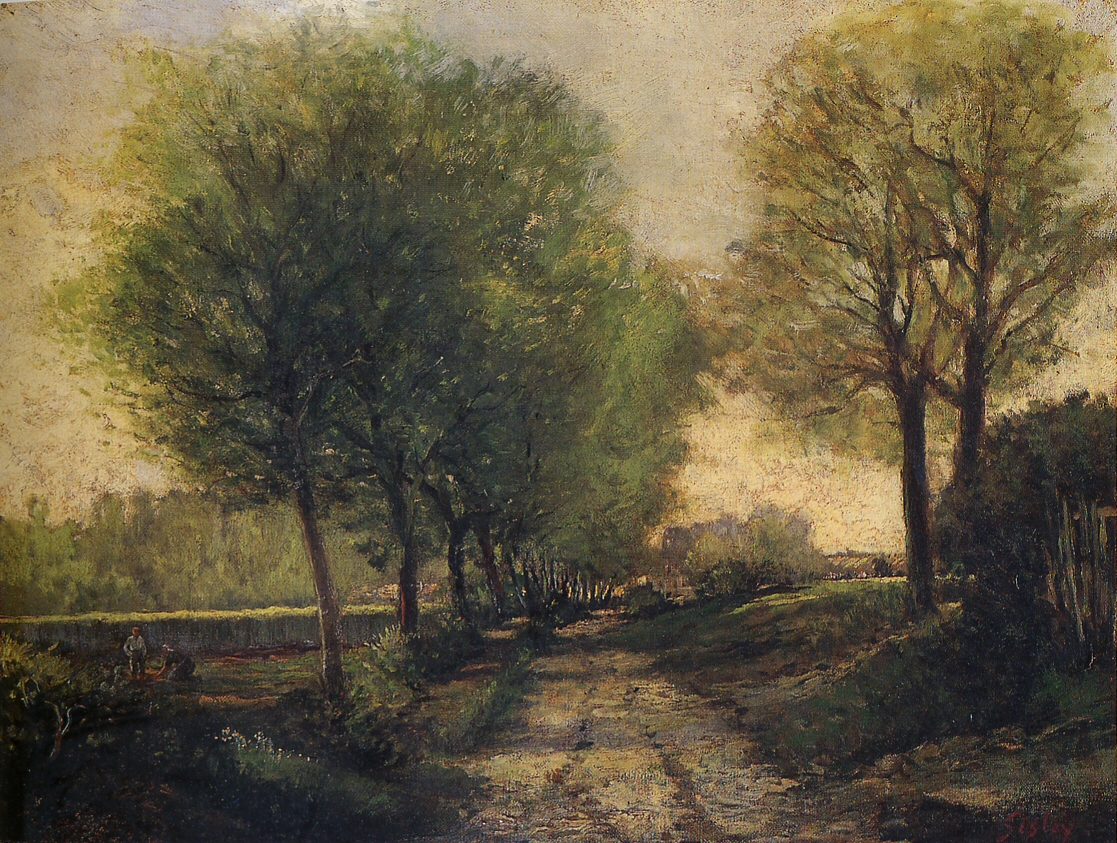
Lane Near a Small Town

One of his works, "Lane Near a Small Town", was mistakenly attributed to Sisley because of a forged signature. The original signature was discovered in 2016, during a restoration at the Kunsthalle Bremen. The painting had been in the possession of Pastor Johann Friedrich Lahmann (1858–1937) and was donated to the museum when he died. Suspicion was aroused when it was noted that the painting was not listed in Sisley's catalogue raisonné.
