= Willits =

Willits may refer to:

== Places ==
- Willits, California
  - Willits Depot located in Willits, California
  - Willits High School also located in Willits, California
  - Willits Municipal Airport, also known as Ells Field, three miles northwest of Willits, California
  - Willits station, or Willits Depot, a historic train station in Willits, California
- Willits House (The Ward W. Willits House), is a building designed by Frank Lloyd Wright
- Levi Willits House, a historic house located in New Boston, Illinois

== People ==
Given name

- Willits J. Hole (1858–1936), American businessman and real estate developer

Surname

- Adam Willits (born 1972), Australian actor
- Christopher Willits, musician and multimedia artist
- Earl Willits (1946–1990), American politician and Iowa senator
- Edwin Willits (1830–1896), American politician from Michigan
- Emma Willits (1869–1965), American pioneering woman physician and surgeon
- Joseph Willit, American investment banker
- Ryan Willits (born 1987), Australian Rules footballer
- Reggie Willits (born 1981), baseball player
- Scott Willits (1895–1973), American violin teacher who created a leading pedagogical method for teaching violin
- Tim Willits, lead designer and co-owner of video game developer id Software
- Wendi Willits Wells (born 1978), American girls basketball high school head coach

== See also ==
- Willetts, a surname
