= Willet (disambiguation) =

Willet is a species of bird.

Willet may also refer to:

- Willet (name)
- USS Willet (AM-54), Lapwing-class minesweeper commissioned by the United States Navy for service after World War I
- Willet (band), American Christian rock band
- Willet, New York, United States
- Willet, Wisconsin, ghost town, United States

== See also ==
- Willett (disambiguation)
