= Willett =

Willett may refer to:

== People ==
- Willett (name)

== Places ==
=== Municipalities ===
- Willett (Columbus, Georgia), neighborhood in Columbus, Georgia
- Willett, South Dakota, a ghost town
- Willett, hamlet of Elworthy, England

=== Geographic features ===
- Willett Cove, cove in Antarctica, named for James H. Willett of the Navy Hydrographic Office
- Willett Range, Antarctic range named for R.W. Willett, Director of the New Zealand Geological Survey
- Willett Hot Springs, hot springs site north of Ojai, California

=== Buildings ===
- Robert E. Willett Elementary School in Davis, California
- Willett Hall, a multipurpose arena in Farmville, Virginia
- Willett House, in Lisbon, Arkansas

== Other uses ==
- USS Kenneth M. Willett (DE-354), U.S. Navy destroyer escort used during World War II
- Willett Distillery, producer of various whiskey brands including Willett Pot Still Reserve and Willett Family Estate bourbon whiskey

== See also ==
- Willetts, surname
- Willet (disambiguation)
