= Rue Lepic =

Street in Paris, France

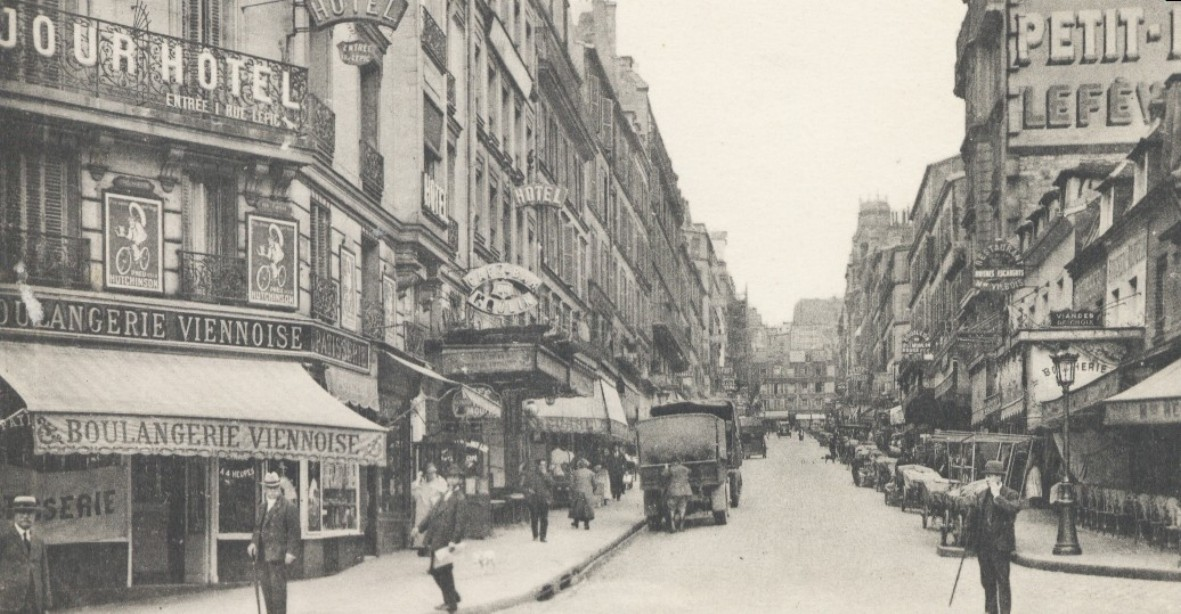
- Rue Lepic in 1925, seen from the Place Blanche

- Location within Paris
- Length: 755 m (2,477 ft)
- Width: 10 to 14 m (33 to 46 ft)
- Arrondissement: 18th
- Quarter: Montmartre, Grandes Carrières
- Coordinates: 48°53′15″N 2°20′7″E
- From: Boulevard de Clichy
- To: Place Jean-Baptiste-Clément

Construction
- Denomination: Decree of 24 August 1864

The Rue Lepic is a street in the former commune of Montmartre, in the 18th arrondissement of Paris, climbing the hill of Montmartre from the Boulevard de Clichy to the Place Jean-Baptiste-Clément.

It is an ancient road resulting of the rectification and re-arrangement of several dirt-roads leading to the Blanche barrier (Place Blanche), starting life as the Chemin-neuf (the Chemin-vieux was the Rue de Ravignan). In 1852, it was renamed the Rue de l'Empereur, before it was renamed again in 1864, after General Louis Lepic (1765–1827).

Located near the Metro station: Blanche.

== Notable addresses ==
- At no. 15, brasserie Café des 2 Moulins where the film Amélie was set.
- At no. 25, in 1910, the cabaret La Vache Enragée was based here.
- At no. 50, poet Jehan Rictus lived at this address for over a decade.
- At no. 53, resided Jean-Baptiste Clément (singer and prominent in Paris Commune) from 1880 to 1891. He then moved to no. 112.
- At no. 54, lived Vincent van Gogh and his brother Théo, on the third floor, from 1886 to 1888. Art dealer Alphonse Portier lived on the first floor for several years; the painter Armand Guillaumin had consigned some of his paintings to him in 1887.
- At no. 56, the Vandoren clarinet and saxophone reed manufacturer. Their premium reed brand is named after this address.
- At no. 59, from 1873-1891, lived the painter Edmond Yon, in a house with an extensive garden. The painter Charles Léandre also lived there in 1910. Former site of Moulin de la Fontaine-Saint-Denis.
- At no. 64, once lived satirical cartoonist Forain in 1875.
- At no. 65, adjacent to the Avenue Junot, is the site of the Moulin-Neuf (1741).
- At no. 72, former workshop of Félix Ziem.
- At no. 73, site of the Moulin-Vieux, which was demolished in 1860.
- At no. 77, Moulin de la Galette and Moulin le Radet.
- At nos. 85 to 87, Moulin de la Petite-Tour construction dating from 1647.
- At no. 87, once lived Willette.
- At no. 89 to 93, Moulin de la Vieille-Tour, built in 1623.
- At nos. 95 to 99, site of the Moulin-du-Palais, built in 1640.
- At no. 98, Louis-Ferdinand Céline resided.
- At no. 100, Austrian doctor David Gruby built an observatory on the roof of the building in 1860.
- Au no. 102, rough site of Moulin de la Grande-Tour, a tower constructed in stone which was taken down before the French Revolution.
- At no. 112, resided Jean-Baptiste Clément in 1891.

== In history ==
Painter and engraver Eugène Delâtre lived and worked on the Rue Lepic. He successively occupied addresses no. 92, no. 87, no. 97, and also no. 102.

Louis Renault built his first car in 1898, calling his car the Voiturette. On December 24, 1898, he won a bet with his friends that his invention was capable of driving up the slope of the Rue Lepic. As well as winning the bet, Renault received twelve definite orders for the vehicle.

On 7 September 1960, Fernand and Jackie Sardou opened their cabaret Chez Fernand Sardou on the road in place of cabaret Belzébuth next to the residence of Utrillo. The cabaret became a preferred meeting place and played to a full house every night. Michel Sardou had his professional début there, firstly as a server.

In the Claude Autant-Lara film, La Traversée de Paris (1956), "Martin" (played by André Bourvil) et "Grandgil" (played by Jean Gabin) were pictured in this road during the German occupation of France transporting a jointed pig destined for the black market.

Yves Montand dedicated to this road the song "Rue Lepic" in the album Yves Montand (1974).

Since 2025, the road has become a notable part of the final stage of the Tour de France where it is used as the final climb to Montmartre

== Sources and references ==
- Dictionnaire historique des rues de Paris
- Paris Guide 1807 - Librairie Internationale
