= John B. Willett =

John Barry Willett is an emeritus professor at Harvard University Graduate School of Education and a member of the National Academy of Education who specialized in the teaching, development and application of innovative quantitative methods in the social sciences.

Willett was born in 1947 in the city of Leeds, in the county of Yorkshire, England, and raised from the age of 10 in the nearby town of Harrogate. He attended Harrogate Grammar School. He received an Open Venning Exhibition to study physics, specializing in quantum mechanics, at Worcester College, Oxford University. He went up to Oxford in 1967, graduating with a degree in physics in 1970. In 1971, after a further year of study at Oxford, he earned a certificate in education, to become a teacher of physics and mathematics.

In 1972, Willett moved with his wife to Hong Kong where he taught high-school physics and mathematics at Hong Kong's Island School until 1978. From 1978 to 1980 he worked in the School of Education at Hong Kong University with in-service teachers of physics in schools in Hong Kong and Kowloon. While working at HKU, Willett earned an advanced diploma in education and a master's degree in psychometric and research methods. Willett authored a physics textbook for students in Hong Kong schools, A New School Physics for Hong Kong, which was published by Ling Kee Press. He hosted a weekly TV science-magazine show, Tomorrow's World, each Sunday evening, on Hong Kong's TVB Pearl, the show being sponsored by the Hong Kong & Shanghai Banking Corporation.

Willett moved to the USA in 1980, with his wife and daughter, and attended graduate school at Stanford University where he earned a master's degree in statistics and a doctorate in applied quantitative methods, graduating in 1985.

In 1985, Willett joined the faculty of the Harvard University Graduate School of Education, eventually reaching full professor, and holding an endowed chair with the title of Charles William Eliot Professor of Education. He went on to be academic dean of the School of Education for two years, under Dean Jerry Murphy, and then became acting dean in Murphy's place for one year under President Larry Summers, serving in both positions jointly with his close colleague and long-time collaborator Judith D. Singer. During his academic career, Willett received the Palmer O. Johnson Memorial Award (in 1988), the Raymond B. Cattell Early Career Award for Programmatic Research (in 1992) and the Research Review Award (1991), from the American Educational Research Association. In 2006, he received the Morningstar Family Award for Excellence in Teaching from the Harvard Graduate School of Education. He was elected a member of the National Academy of Education in 2004.

Willett works on statistical methods for analysis of longitudinal data and in quantitative methods for making causal inferences from data, in education and the social sciences. During his academic career, both individually and in collaboration with colleagues, he wrote five books and more than 130 peer-reviewed academic papers. He taught courses in applied quantitative methods, including courses on applied data analysis, covariance structure analysis, applied longitudinal data analysis, research design and causal inference.

In 1990, under the auspices of the Harvard Seminar on Assessment, with Judith D. Singer and Richard J. Light, Willett wrote By Design: Planning Research on Higher Education. The Harvard Assessment Seminar was established by Harvard President Derek Bok, in the late 1980s, to identify, address and offer solutions to the issue of systematic assessment in higher education. It was organized and chaired by Professor Richard J. Light and attended by more than 100 university faculty and administrators from twenty universities around the USA, and by representatives of selected State and Federal Agencies. By Design was the authors' contribution to the seminar's purpose.

In 1991, Willett and his collaborators Richard J. Murnane, Judith D. Singer, James J. Kemple and Randall J. Olsen published a portrait of the careers of more than 50,000 teachers who were serving in America's public schools, based on extensive discrete-time survival analyses of their longitudinal teaching records. The book was titled Who Will Teach? and was published by Harvard University Press.

In 2003, Willett and his collaborator Judith D. Singer wrote Applied Longitudinal Data Analysis: Modeling Change and Event Occurrence. Applied Longitudinal Data Analysis was published by Oxford University Press. It received honorable mention from the American Publishers Association for the best mathematics and statistics book of 2003.

Most recently, Willett and his colleague, Richard J. Murnane, published a book that presents and describes improved methods for making causal inferences from empirical data in social and educational research. The book, Methods Matter: Improving Causal Inference in Educational and Social Research, was published in 2011 by Oxford University Press.
