= Willett Cove =

Willett Cove (72°19′S 170°14′E) is a small cove on the south side of Seabee Hook, a recurved spit formed 1 nautical mile (1.9 km) west of Cape Hallett at the entrance to Edisto Inlet, Victoria Land. Surveyed in January 1956 by members of U.S. Navy Operation Deepfreeze I from the icebreaker Edisto. Named by Advisory Committee on Antarctic Names (US-ACAN) for James H. Willett of the Navy Hydrographic Office, who directed the establishment of astronomical control stations on Ross Island and Seabee Hook in 1955–56.

== See also ==
- Construction Point
