= Moulin de la Galette =

Windmill in Paris, France

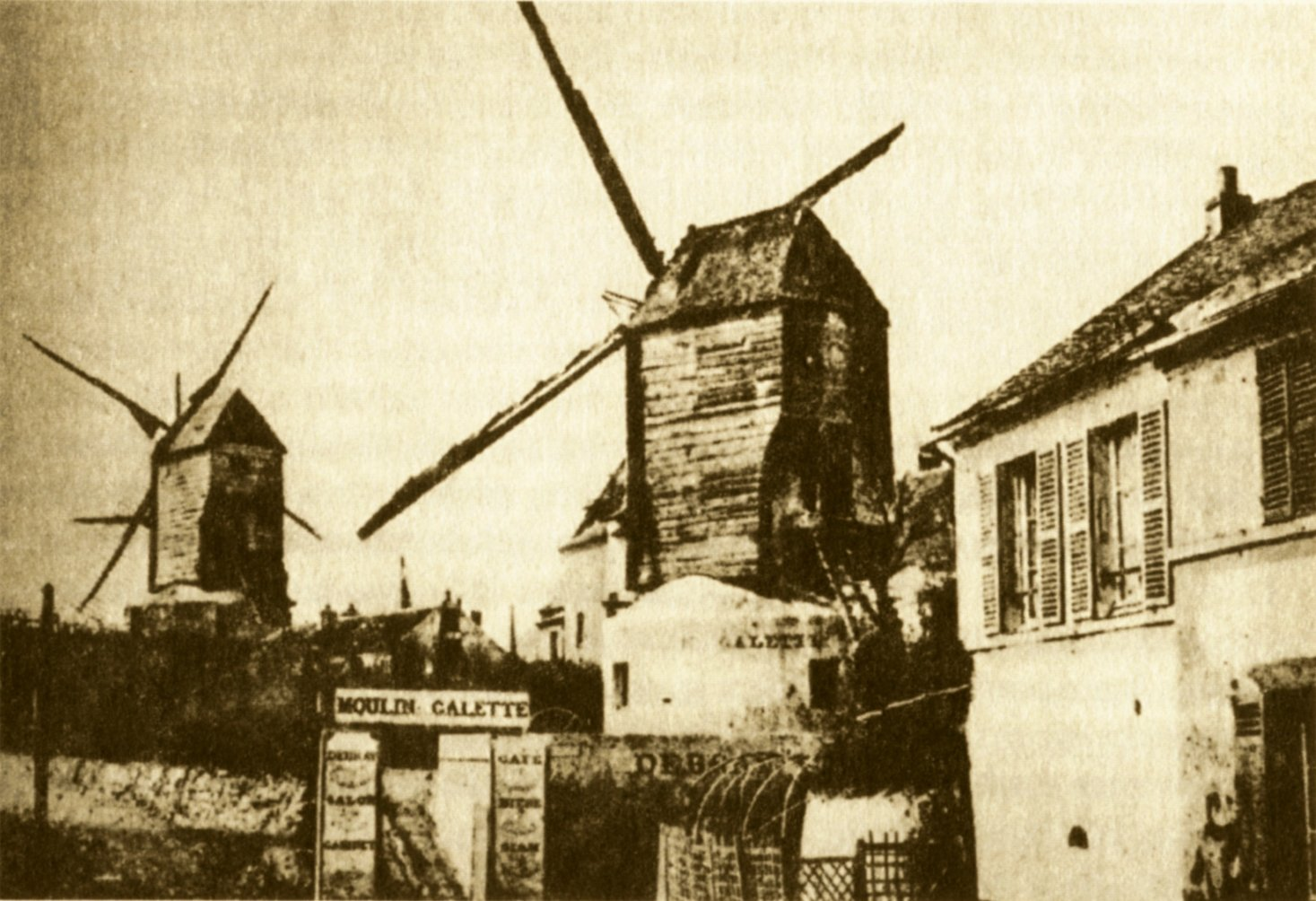
- Moulin de la Galette in 1885

- Location within Paris
- 48°53′14.63″N 2°20′13.36″E
- Type: Windmill
- Location: Montmartre, Paris

History
- Built: 1622

Monument historique
- Official name: Moulin de la Galette
- Designated: 24 June 1993
- Reference no.: PA00086755

The Moulin de la Galette (French pronunciation: [mulɛ̃ də la ɡalɛt]) is a windmill and associated businesses situated near the top of the district of Montmartre in Paris. The windmill was built in 1622. In the 19th century, the Debray family who were the owners and millers made a brown bread galette, which became popular and was adopted as the name of the windmill and its businesses, which have included a famous guinguette and restaurant. In the 19th century, Le Moulin de la Galette represented diversion for Parisians seeking entertainment, a glass of wine and bread made from flour ground by the windmill. Artists such as Renoir, van Gogh, Ramón Casas and Pissarro have immortalized Le Moulin de la Galette, probably the most famous example being Renoir's festive painting, Bal du moulin de la Galette.

== Windmill ==
The present day Moulin de la Galette restaurant topped by the original Moulin Radet.

The windmill Moulin de la Galette, also known as Blute-fin, was built in 1622. The name Blute-fin comes from the French verb bluter which means sifting flour for the separation from bran.

The Debray family acquired the two mills in 1809 for producing flour, the Blute-fin and the Radet, built in 1717. But it was also used to pressurize the harvest or grind materials needed for manufacturing.

An association Friends of Old Montmartre saved it from destruction in 1915. In 1924, its owner moved the windmill to the corner of Girardon and Lepic streets. It was restored in 1978, but is not running. The windmill has been classified as a monument since 1958.

== Sieges in 1814 and 1870 ==
At the end of the Napoleonic Wars in 1814, during the siege of Paris three Debray men died defending the windmill against Cossacks; the miller was killed and nailed to the wings of the windmill.

During the Franco-Prussian War of 1870, Montmartre was attacked by 20,000 Prussian soldiers. During the siege, Pierre-Charles Debray was killed and nailed to the wings of the windmill. A mass grave for those killed during the siege was made a few metres from the Moulin de la Galette.

== Commercial expansion ==
The mill was turned into a guinguette by the surviving son of the miller killed during the siege of Paris in 1814.

Auguste Renoir, Bal du moulin de la Galette 1876

The current name Moulin de la Galette is based upon galette, a small brown bread that the Debray millers, who owned the mill in the 19th century, made and sold with a glass of milk. The bread became so popular that it later became the name of the windmill. In 1830, they replaced milk with wine (especially the local Montmartre wine) and the windmill became a cabaret. Parisians made their way to Montmartre to enjoy "the simple pleasures" of the countryside with a glass of wine, freshly baked bread and a terrace view of Paris and the Seine below. In 1833, one of the Debrays decided to open an area for dancing, dedicated to the Greek muse Terpsichore. His flair for dancing and enthusiasm attracted patrons to the dancing hall and it became a success.

Author Émile Zola wrote in 1876, "We rushed off into the countryside to celebrate the joy of not having to listen to any more talk about politics," which often meant reflection of France's defeat in the Franco-Prussian War. Montmartre, attainable by a train ride or a one-hour walk, was still a village with orchards, shops and two remaining windmills.

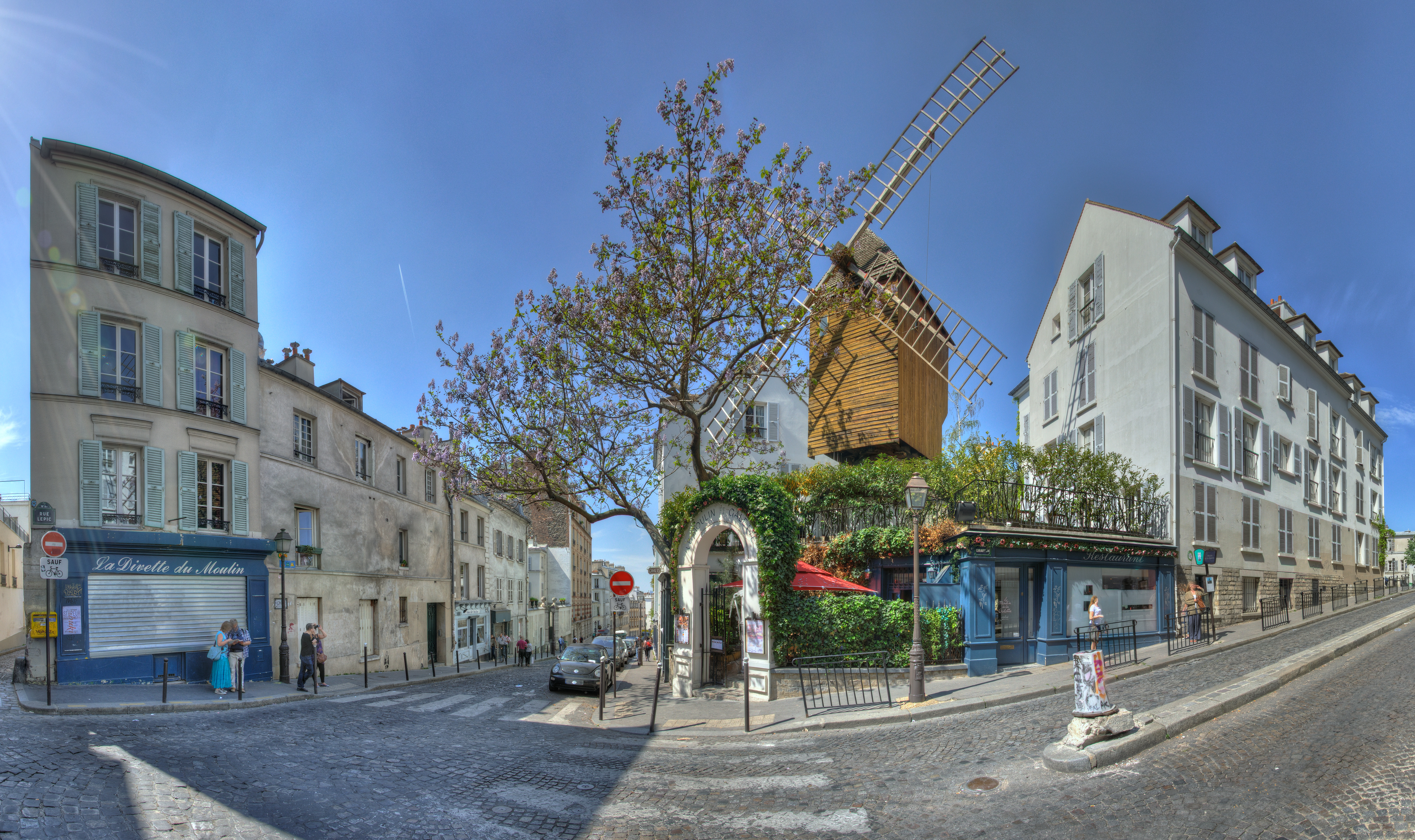
Moulin de la Galette panorama

As the nearby fields were replaced with housing and factories, Nicholas Charles Debray sought commercial opportunities to remain a going concern. One of the windmills was turned into a viewing tower and a dance hall was opened adjacently. People came to the relaxed, popular Moulin de la Galette for entertainment and dancing.

Over its history, the building has experienced a wide range of uses: open-air cafe, music-hall, television studios and restaurant. It is now a private property. The windmill Radet, however, marks the entrance to a bistro named Le Moulin de la Galette.

== Gallery ==
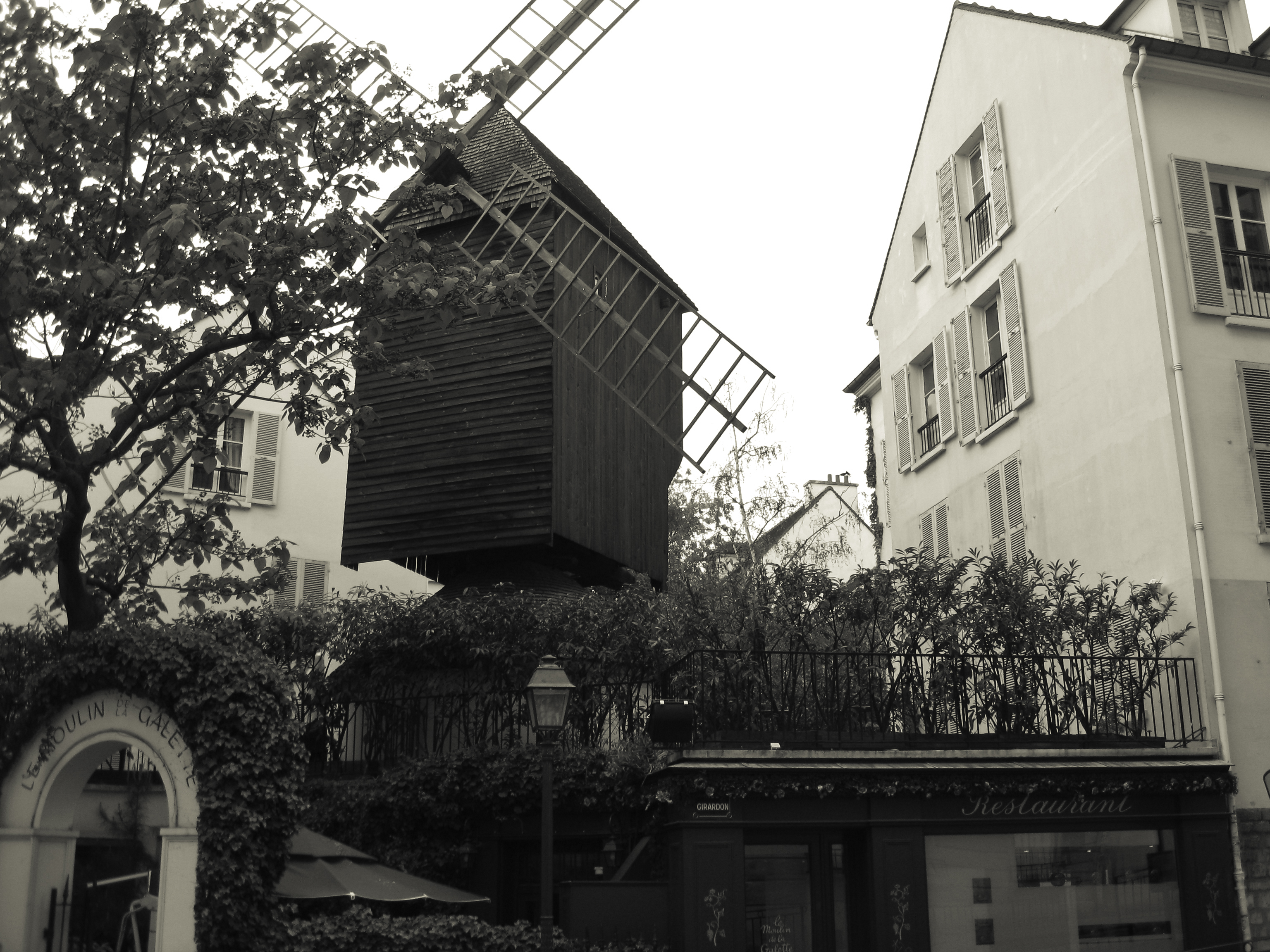
Moulin de la Galette black and white

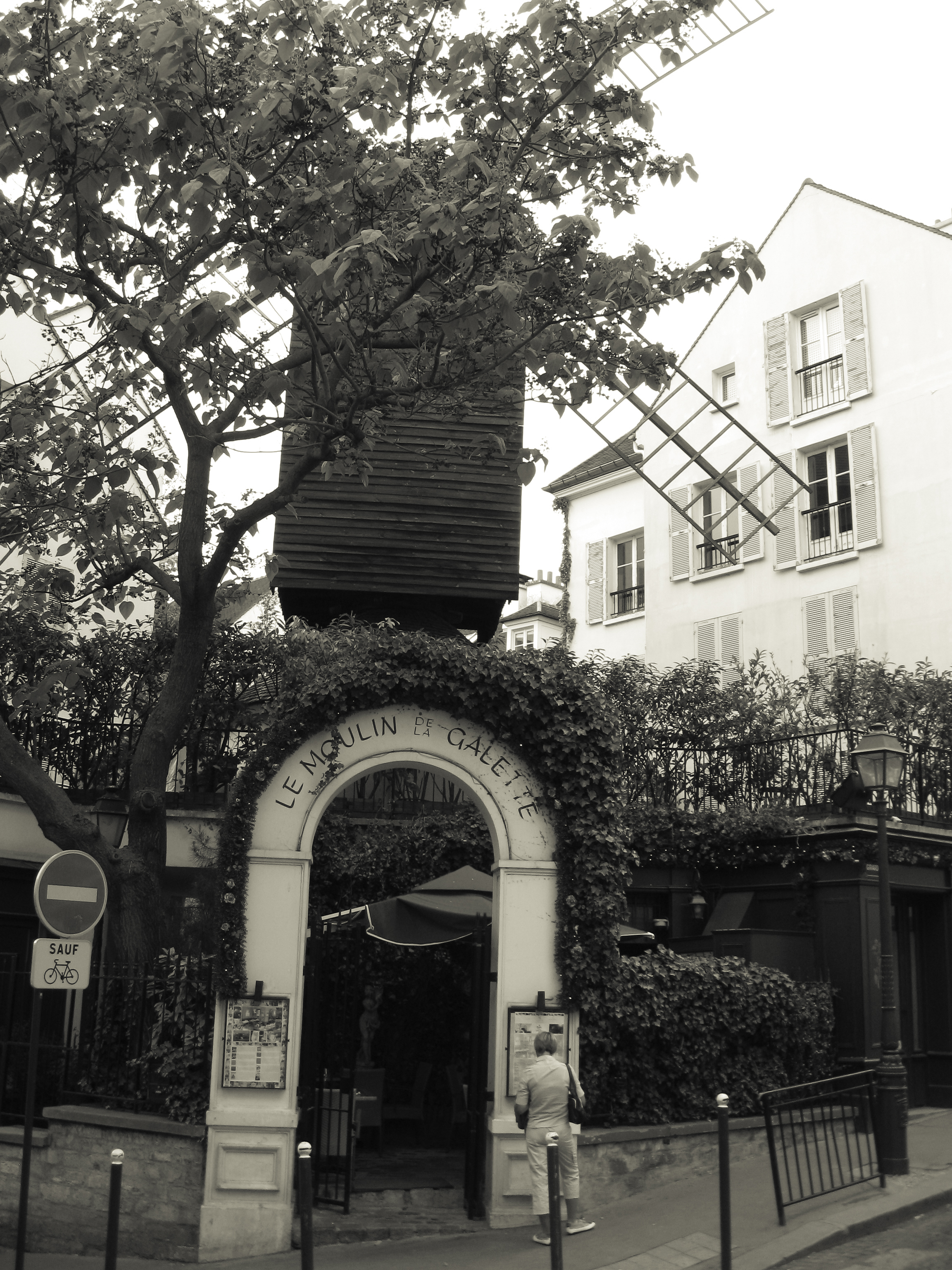

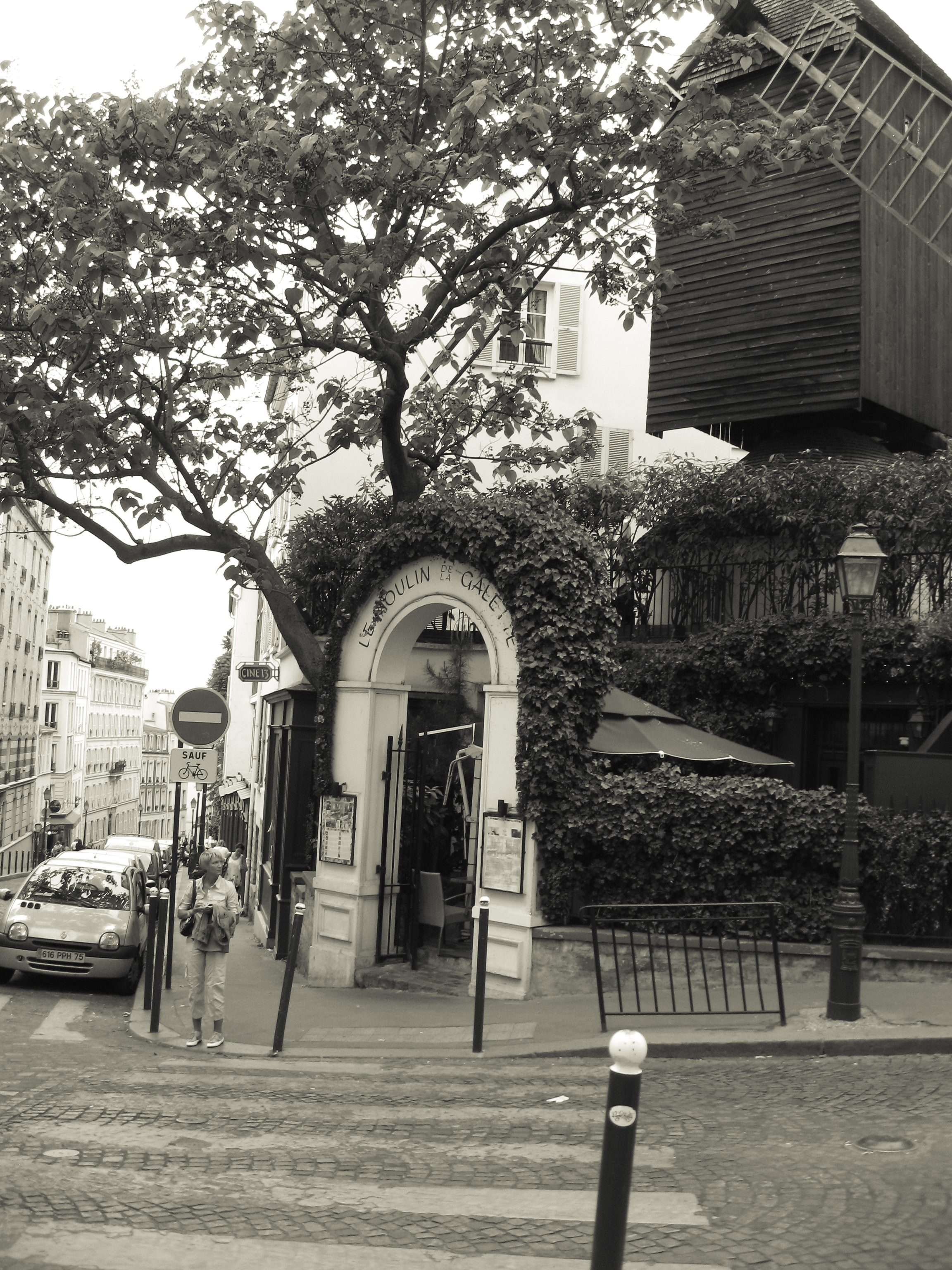

== The windmill in art ==
The area has been depicted by artists such as Pierre-Auguste Renoir, Henri de Toulouse-Lautrec, Vincent van Gogh, Pablo Picasso, Ramon Casas, Paul François Quinsac, Kees van Dongen and Maurice Utrillo.

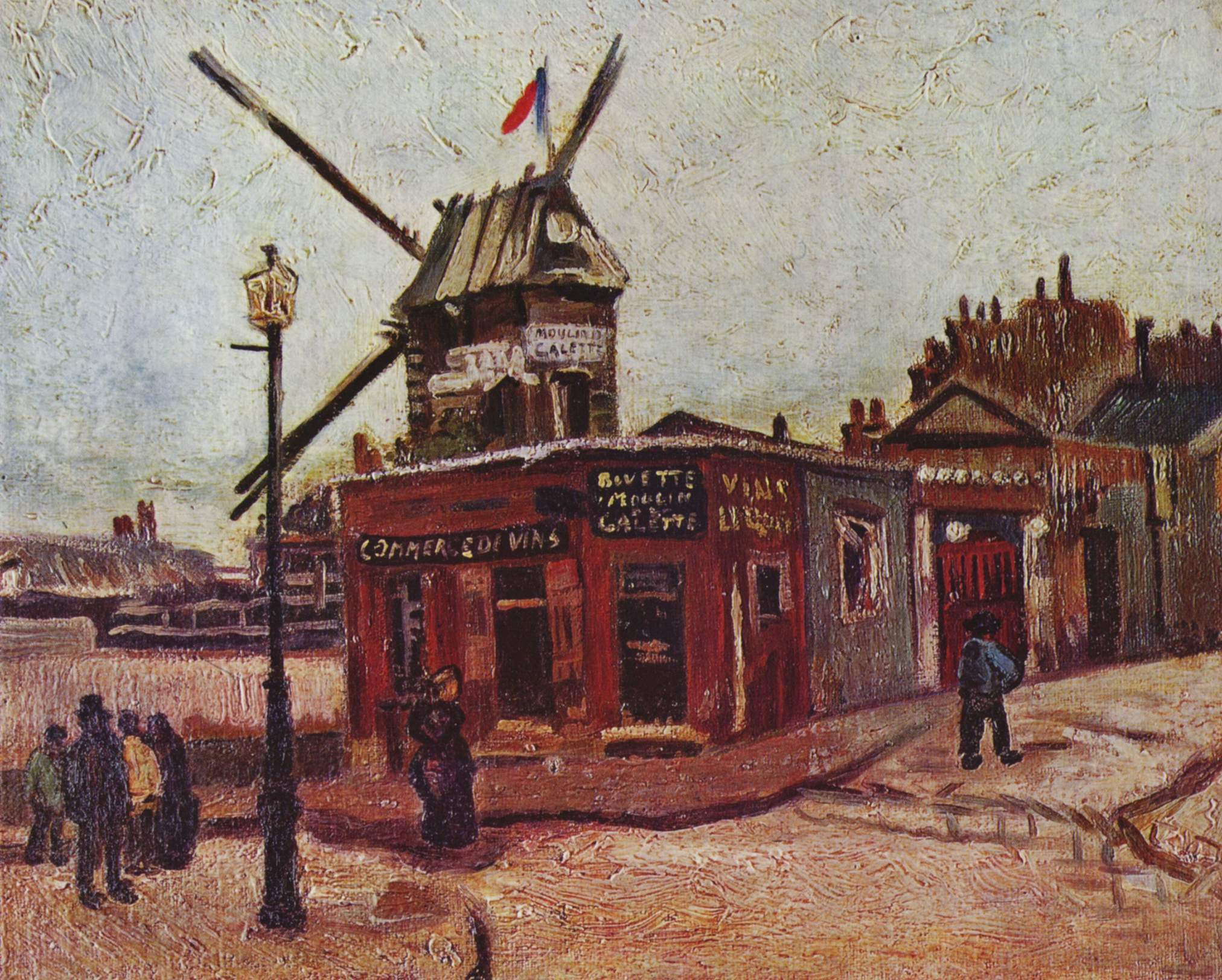
Vincent van Gogh, Le Moulin de la Galette 1886

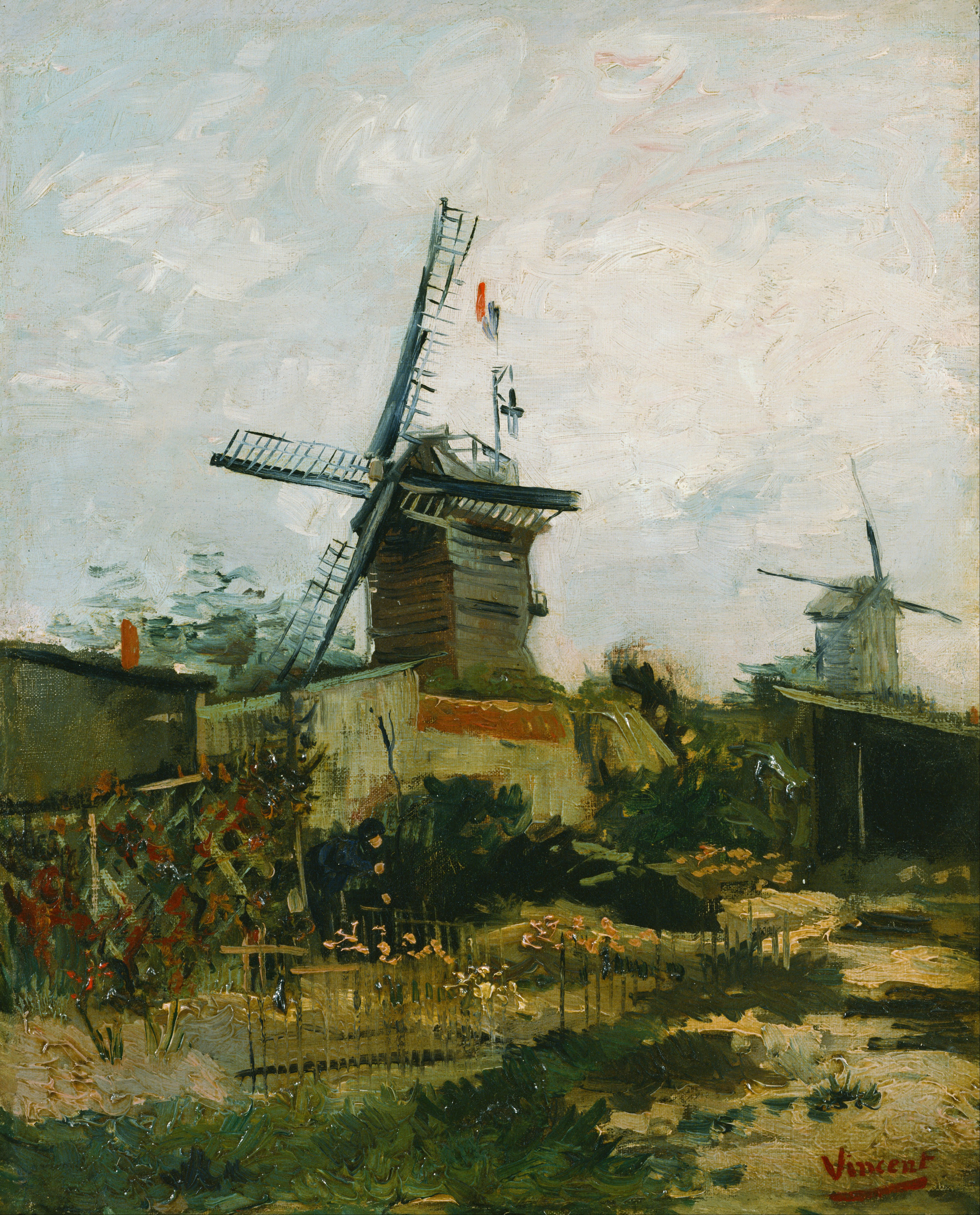
Le Moulin de Blute-Fin (1886) from the Le Moulin de la Galette and Montmartre series'

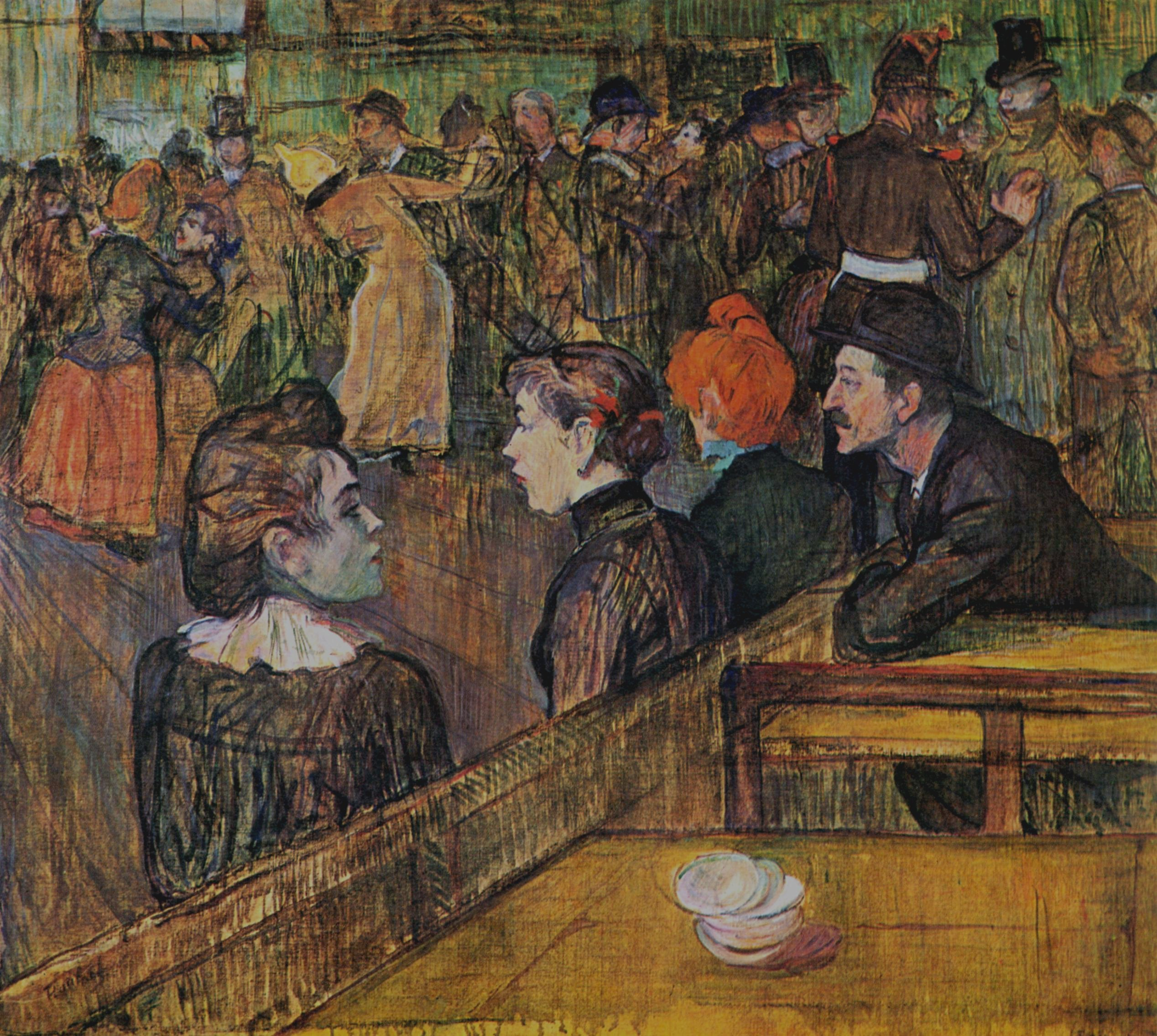
Henri de Toulouse-Lautrec, Au bal du moulin de la Galette 1889
