= Willett, South Dakota =

Coordinates: 45°48′53″N 103°53′37″W

Willett is a ghost town in Harding County, in the U.S. state of South Dakota.

== History ==
A post office called Willett was established in 1909, and remained in operation until 1952. The town was named for the a local family engaged in ranching.
