= Willet (band) =

American Christian rock band

- Origin: Westminster, Maryland
- Genres: Christian rock
- Years active: 2006–present
- Members: Jeremy Willet; Justin Willet; Jordan Willet
- Past members: Matt von Herbulis
- Website: willetonline.com

Willet is an American Christian rock band, and they are the three Willet brothers, Jeremy, Justin, and Jordan. They come from Westminster, Maryland, where the band started making music in 2006. They released, two extended plays, Sometimes a City Needs a Bomb in 2007, and Love on the Outside in 2012. The group have released four studio albums, Virus in 2008, Somewhere in Between in 2009, Teeth of a Lion, Fangs of a Lioness in 2010, and Searchlight in 2014.

== Background ==
Willet is a Christian rock band from Westminster, Maryland, where they formed in 2006, being a group of three brothers, lead vocalist, Jeremy Willet, lead guitarist, Justin Willet, bassist, Jordan Willet, and drummer, Matt von Herbulis, who has since departed the band. The group now has Jeremy as a vocalist and bassist, Justin on lead guitar and background vocals, and his brother Jordan is their drummer.

== Music history ==
The band started as a musical entity in 2006, with their first release, Sometimes a City Needs a Bomb, an extended play, that was released in 2007. Their subsequent release, a studio album, Virus, was released in 2008. They release, another studio album, Somewhere in Between, in 2009. The band released a Christmas album, Willet Snow On Christmas? Vol 1, in 2009. Their next release, Teeth of a Lion, Fangs of a Lioness, a studio album, came out in 2010. The band released, another extended play, Love on the Outside, on April 3, 2012. Their latest release, Searchlight, came out on August 26, 2014.

== Members ==
Current members

- Jeremy Willet - lead vocals, bass (later)
- Justin Willet - lead guitar, background vocals (later)
- Jordan Willet - bass (early), drums (later)

Former members

- Matt von Herbulis - drums (early)

== Discography ==
Studio albums

- Virus (2008)
- Somewhere in Between (2009)
- Teeth of a Lion, Fangs of a Lioness (2010)
- Searchlight (2014)

EPs

- Sometimes a City Needs a Bomb (2007)
- Love on the Outside (2012)
