= Willetts =

Willetts is a surname. It may refer to:

- Dave Willetts (born 1952), British actor
- David Willetts (born 1956), British Conservative Party politician
- Helen Willetts, BBC television weather presenter
- Karl Willetts, member of the British band Bolt Thrower
- Michael Willetts (1943–1971), British soldier, posthumous recipient of the George Cross
- Scott Willits (1895–1973), American musician and violin teacher
- Terry Willetts (born 1939), English cricketer

== See also ==
- Willett (disambiguation)
- Willits (disambiguation)
