= Simultaneous Contrasts =

Painting series by Sonia Delaunay

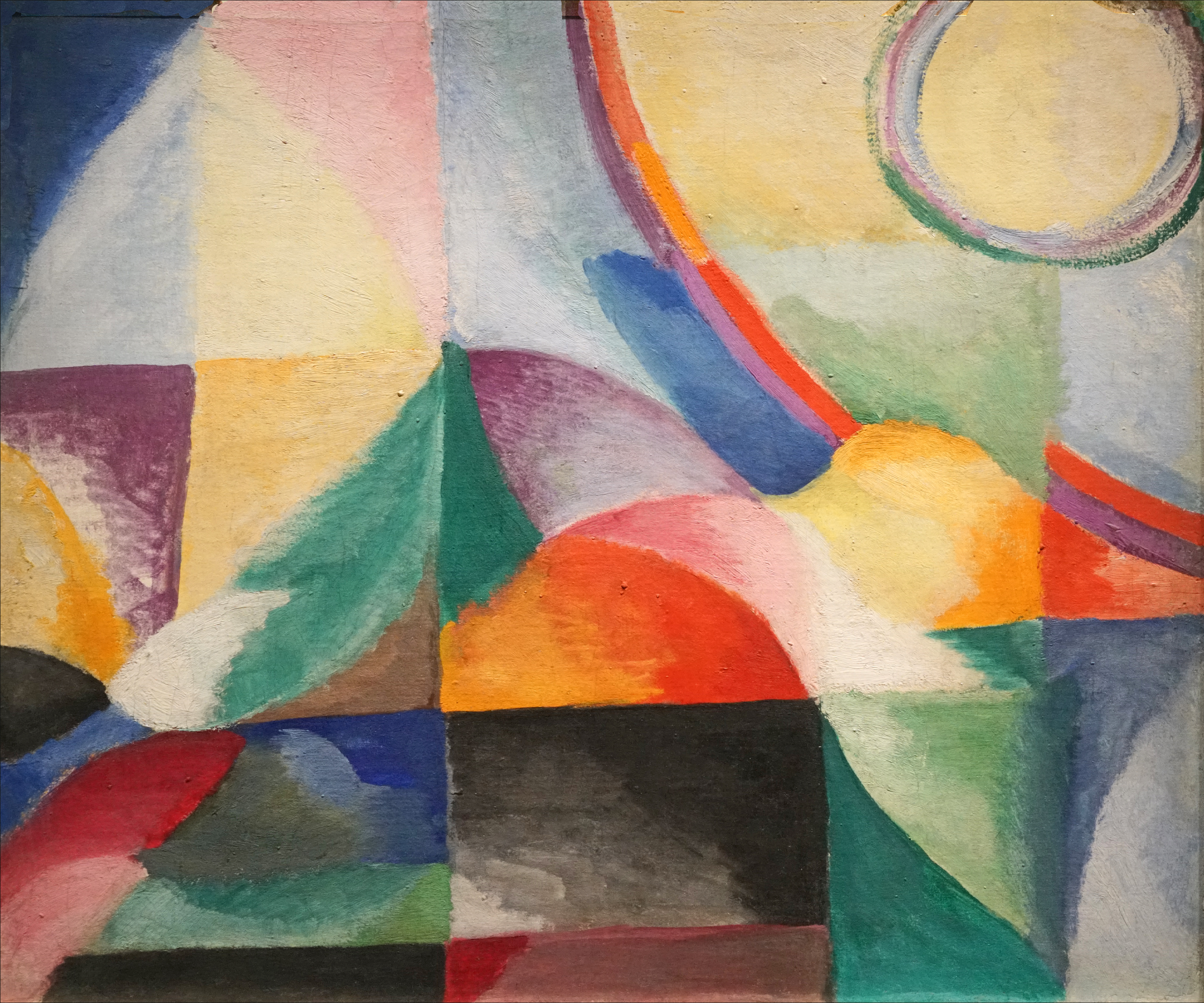
- Artist: Sonia Delaunay
- Year: 1913
- Location: Museo Thyssen-Bornemisza, Madrid

Simultaneous Contrasts (French: Contrastes simultanés) is the title of a series of paintings created by Sonia Delaunay, beginning in 1912. The series was inspired by Eugène Chevreul's theory of simultaneous contrast, according to which the perception of color is affected by the presence of adjacent colors.

== Background ==
The Simultaneous Contrasts series grew from the ideas of "simultanism" that Delaunay explored with her husband Robert Delaunay in the early 1910s. While shaped by Chevreul's theories, the concept of simultanism also integrated other aspects of perception tied to modern urban life.

Chevreul's law of simultaneous contrast was based on the idea that an individual's perception of colors would change based on their position relative to other colors. For the creation of "simultanism," Delaunay looked to Chevreul's work to find what she described as "even more harmonies based on contrasts, dissonances, that is to say rapid vibration that provoke a color's greater exultation due to the juxtaposition of certain warm and cool colors."

During this period, her interest in light and color was shaped by a variety of factors. The growing prevalence of electric lighting in Paris was one major source of inspiration. Another influence was her connection with experimental poets, most notably Blaise Cendrars, whose work explored the effect of startling juxtapositions. Together, they wrote La Prose du Transsiberien, as an attempt to reveal words through color. Guillaume Apollinaire commented: "Blaise Cendrars and Mrs. Delaunay-Terk have made a first attempt at written simultaneity where color contrasts caused the eye to become accustomed to reading an entire poem at one glance."

The Simultaneous Contrasts pictures were among Delaunay's first oil paintings after the birth of her son in 1911.

== Content ==
Several of Delaunay's paintings in the series include identifiable architectural motifs, such as parts of the Eiffel Tower. But they are largely abstract works, often without any recognizable subjects. In this aspect, her series differs from the work of her husband, Robert Delaunay, whose exploration of simultaneous contrasts was more integrated with subjects such as windows and the Eiffel Tower. Robert created several paintings with similar titles, such as Simultaneous Contrasts and Simultaneous Contrasts: Sun and Moon.

Simultaneous Contrasts: Sun and Moon
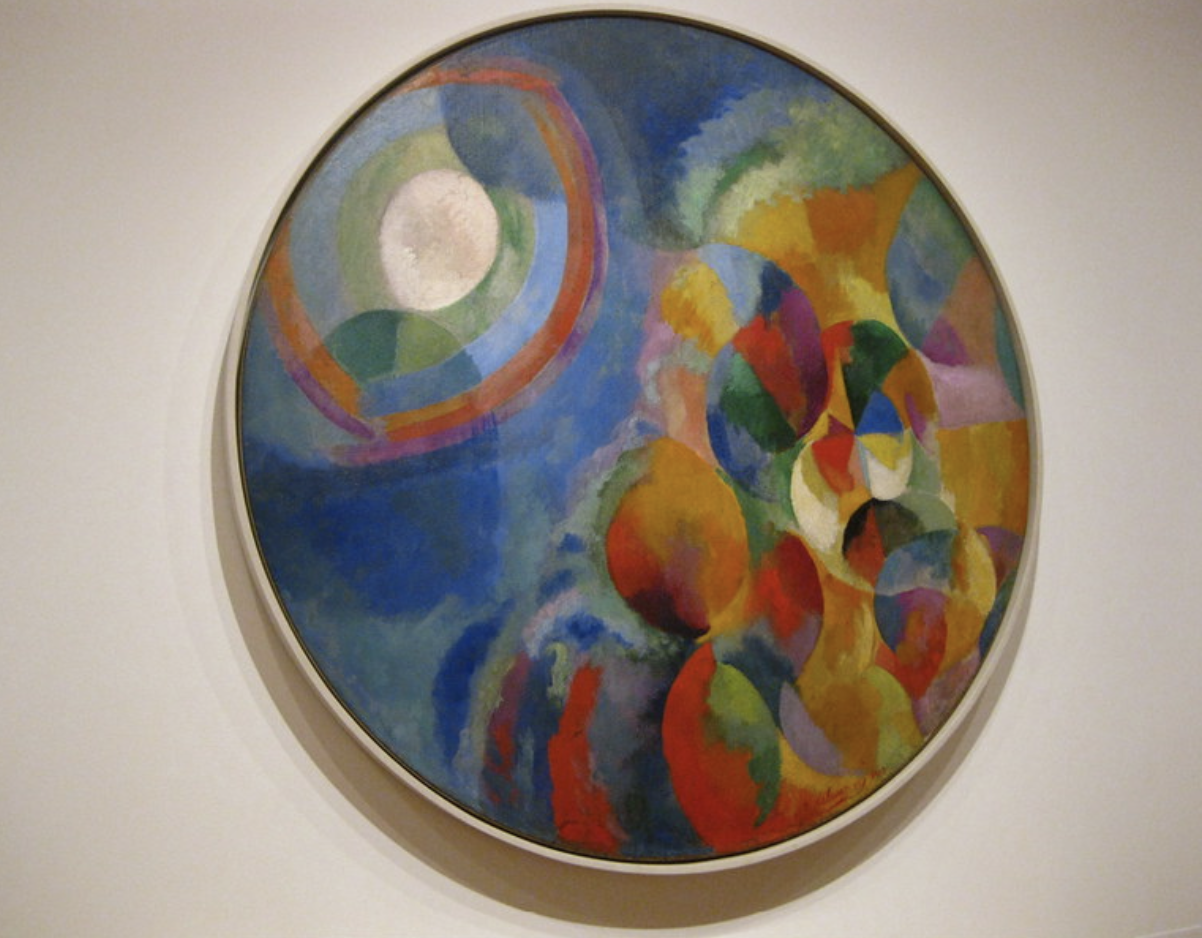
- Artist: Robert Delaunay
- Year: 1913

== Versions ==
There are at least two versions of the painting in public collections. One version, which is currently in the Centre Pompidou in Paris, is signed and dated 1912. Another version in the Museo Thyssen-Bornemisza likely dates from after 1913.

Slight differences exist in the two versions of the painting. In the Thyssen-Bornemisza Collection's version, there is a deep magenta color. However, in the version in the Pompidou, there is a dull yellow in the same space.

More significant differences are seen as well. In the Thyssen-Bornemisza Collection's version, the green triangle is shorter and vertical. It is also a blue color. On the other hand, the same triangle is yellow and pink in the Museé national d'art moderne's version.

== Orientation ==
The correct orientation of the paintings is not clear. The signature placement indicates its vertical orientation, however a photo of the painting in Sonia Delaunay's archives shows the painting without a signature. However, when considering other works during 1913, it would appear that the painting is meant to be horizontal. On the version dated 1912, the orientation could be horizontal or vertical. The measurements described in Delaunay's catalogue would indicate that the painting is horizontal.
