= August Suter (sculptor) =

Swiss sculptor (1887–1965)

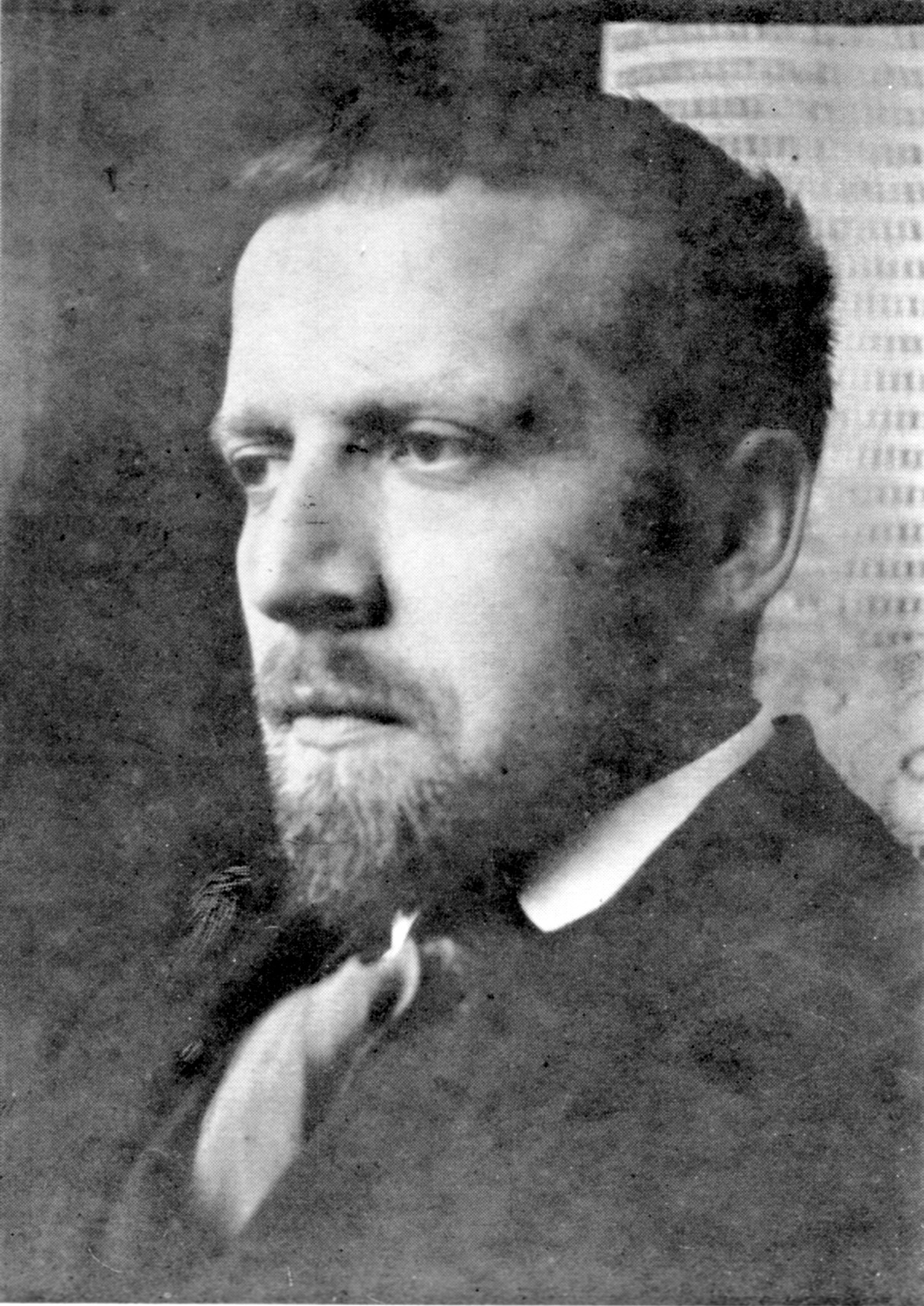
- August Suter around 1912
- Born: 19 July 1887; Basel, Switzerland
- Died: 28 November 1965 (aged 78)
- Education: Académie Julian
- Occupation: sculptor
- Known for: naturalistic work, male and female figures and busts
- Children: Claude (son)
- Parents: Johannes Suter (father); Katharina Suter-Schaub (mother)

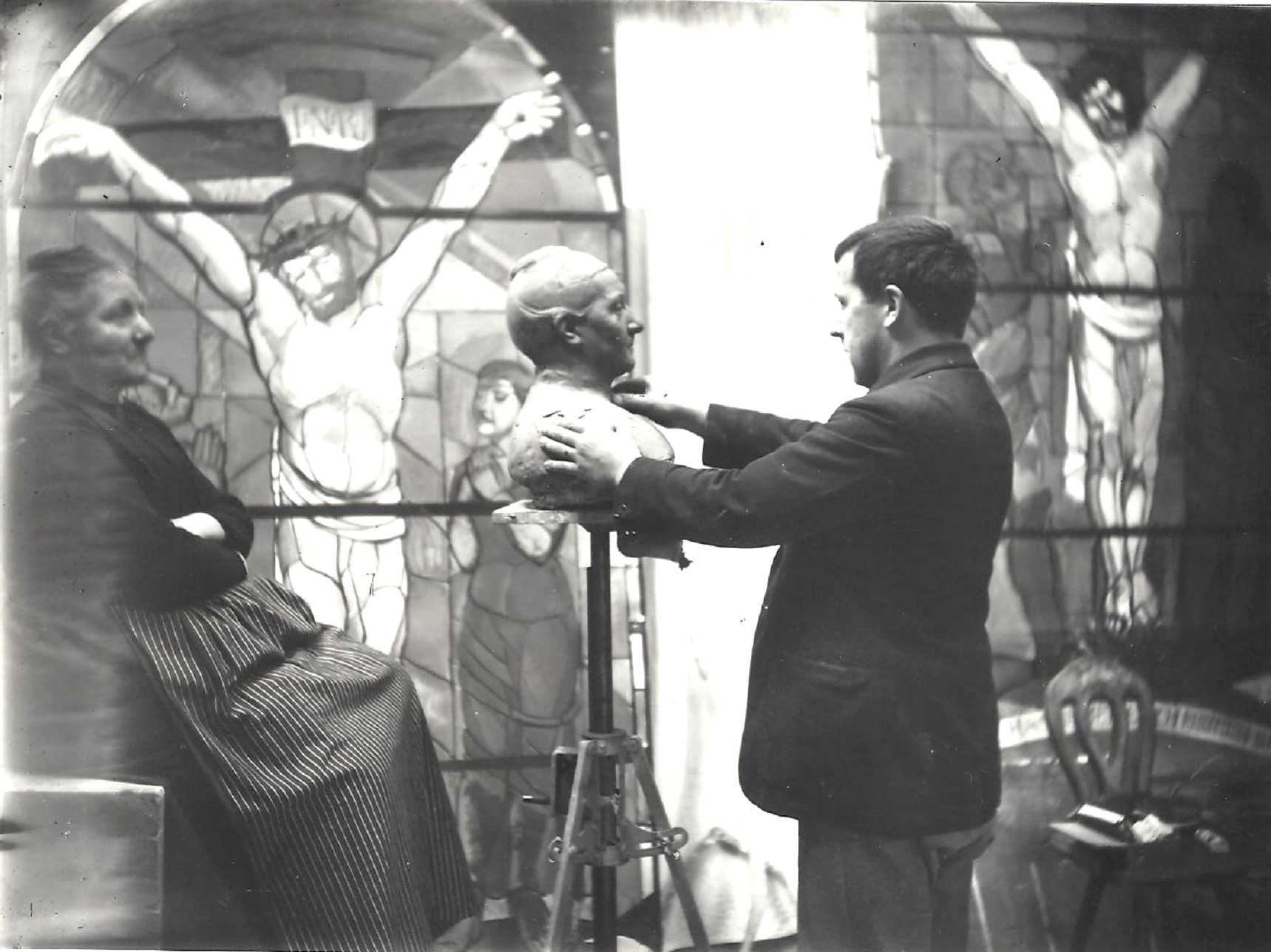
Suter working on a bust of his mother; stained glass windows for Fluntern Reformed Church in background

August Suter (19 July 1887 – 28 November 1965) was one of the most prominent Swiss sculptors of European stature in the first half of the 20th century. His circle of friends included important literary figures like Blaise Cendrars and James Joyce.

== Life ==
August Suter was born at Basel, the son of Johannes Suter (1857–1907) a bookbinder from Eptingen and Katharina Suter-Schaub (1859–1941). After an apprenticeship as a bookbinder with his father and courses in painting and drawing at the Basel Gewerbeschule (vocational school) he worked for local sculptor Carl Gutknecht (1878–1970), before he went to the Académie Julian in Paris in 1910. But he soon became an independent artist there and formed lifelong friendships with the writer Blaise Cendrars and the English painter Frank Budgen, who worked as a model for him. Cendrars was later to write a successful novel (L'Or) about Suter's grandfather, Johann August of gold rush fame. Rodo (Auguste de Niederhäusern) advised him to whole-heartedly turn to sculpture. A long-standing friend was the Swiss poet and translator Siegfried Lang. Shortly before the War he also became acquainted with the German writer and anarchist Johannes Nohl. During the World War I Suter worked in Basel and Zurich, where he, his brother Paul and Frank Budgen got to know the exiled Irish writer James Joyce. He married singer Helene Moser (1893–1965) in 1917 and had three sons. From 1921 to 1939 Suter lived in Paris again and befriended the sculptor Charles Despiau, whose studio lay next to his. After World War II he worked intermittently in Paris and Basel, where he died at the age of 79 just months after his wife.

== Work ==
Suter's naturalistic work is dominated by male and female nudes, figure compositions, portrait busts and architectural sculpture. In 1925 Ludwig Marcuse called him “the most important sculptor of our time”. At first he was influenced by Rodin and Bourdelle, but turned to Maillol's classicism in the fourth decade of his life. Art historian Gotthard Jedlicka points out an important difference to Rodin: "where Rodin seizes impetuously, he waits calmly, and everytime he imbeds the unique rhythm of a particular life into the specific rhythm of his composition". Frank Budgen wrote in his Memoir, Myselves when Young: "He excelled in portraiture. His work in that field was sensitive, forthright and masculine, occasionally leaning towards the baroque, yet always saved by a sense of measure from falling into expressionist caricature. I have often thought when walking through the gallery of Roman portraits in the British Museum that the artists who made them were Suter's far-off forebears." Suters most famous sculpture is the memorial “Prometheus and the Soul” for the Swiss Nobel Prize poet Carl Spitteler at Liestal near Basel, which he worked on from 1926 to 1931.

An unburned clay sculpture of James Joyce did not survive World War II.

Suter's son Claude donated his father's artistic legacy to the Basel municipality of Eptingen where it is accessible on request (museum@eptingen.ch). The August-Suter-Museum is situated at the old schoolhouse Schulstraße 5, Eptingen.

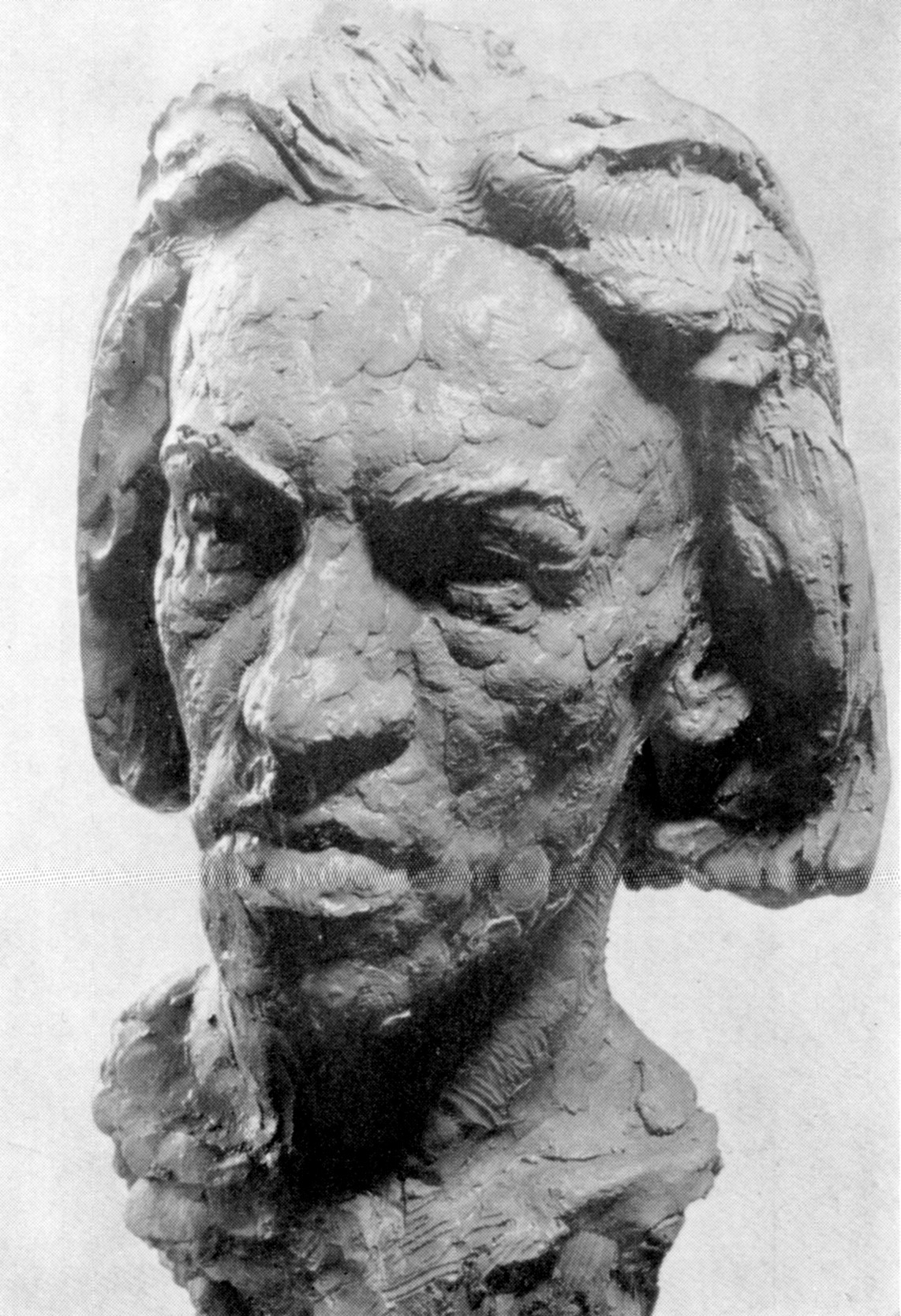
Portrait bust (destroyed) of Blaise Cendrars (around 1911)

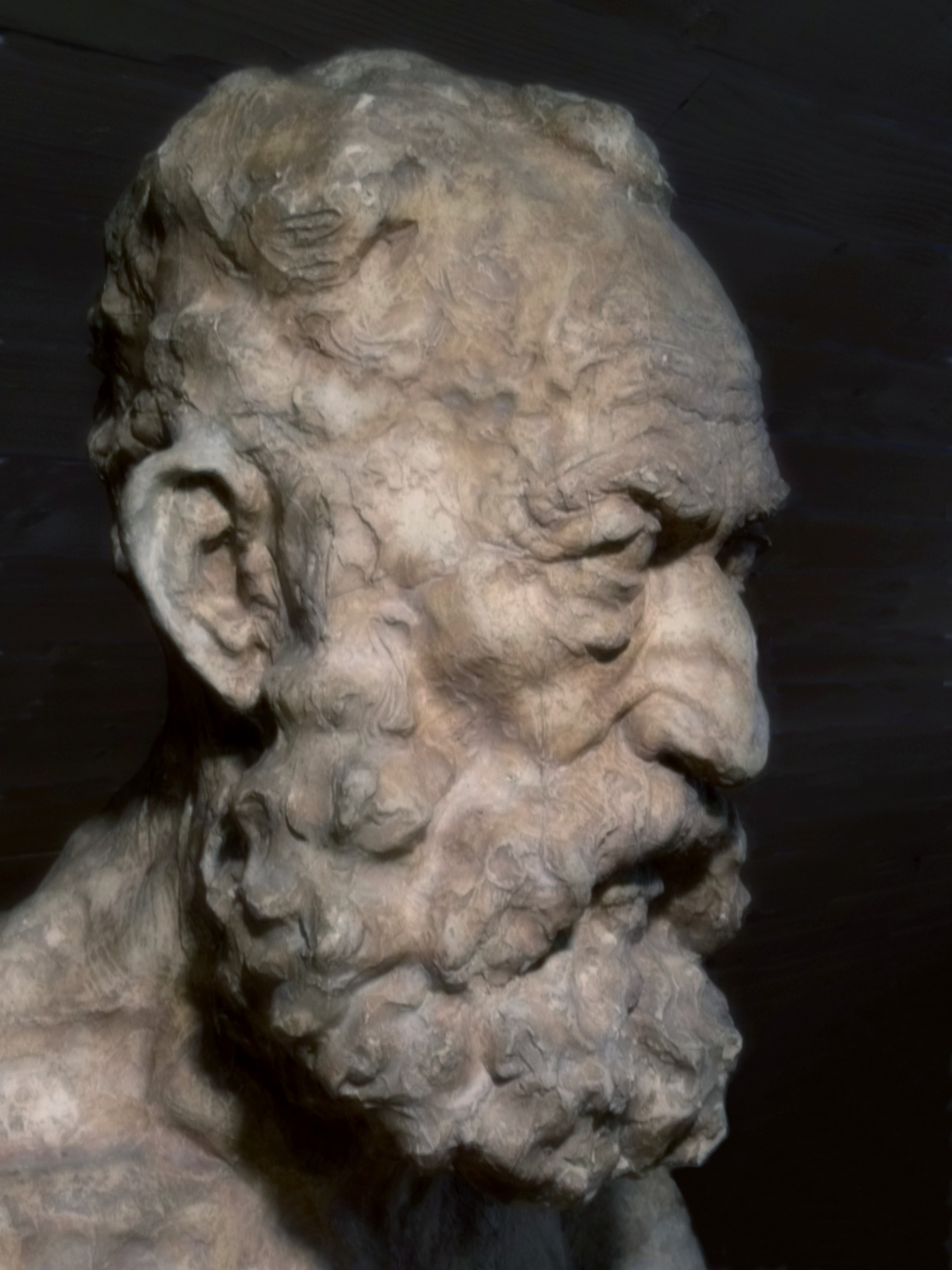
Karl Frutiger, farmer at Ringgenberg (1912)

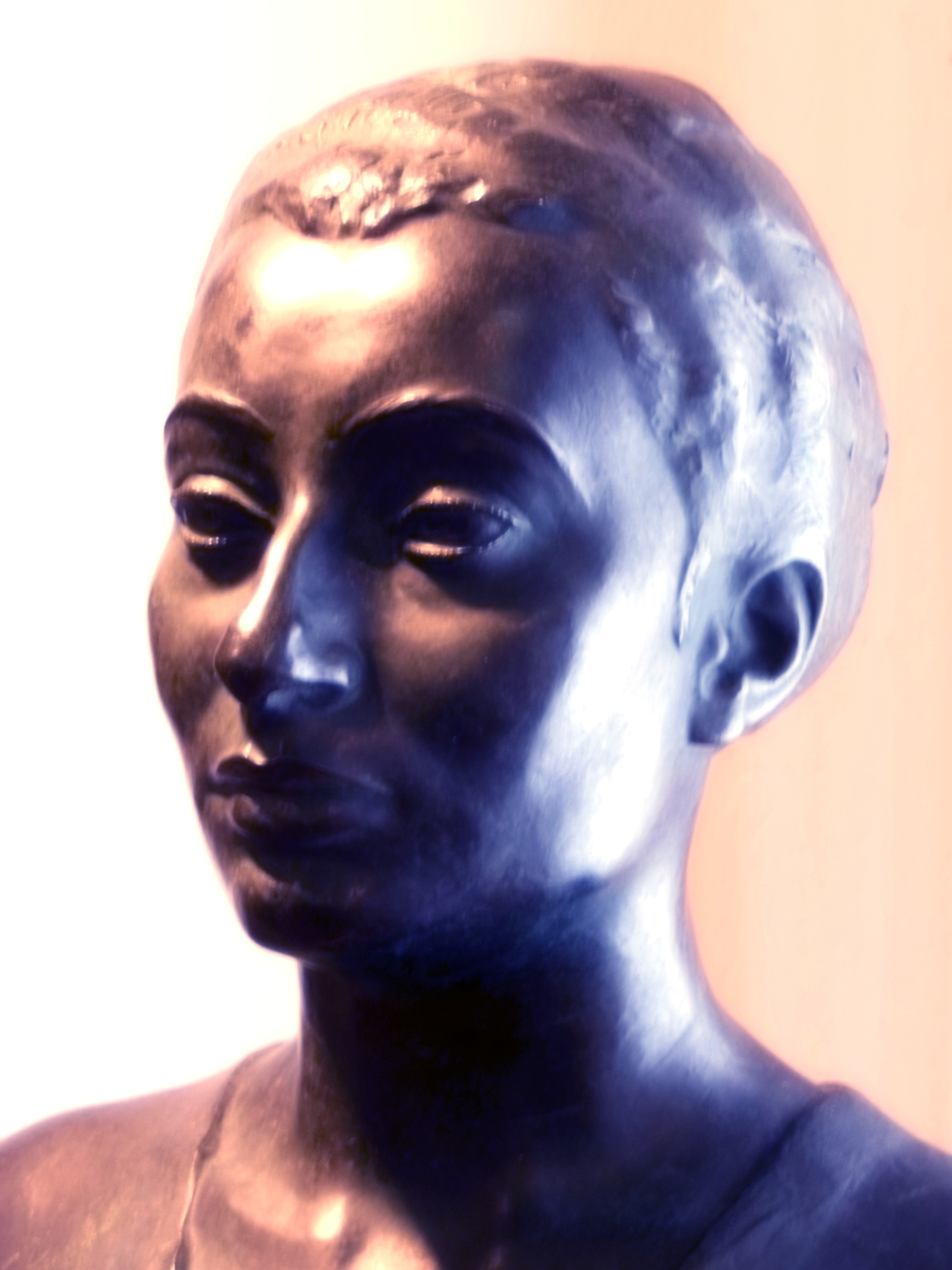
Bronze bust of Ella Schwartz (1929)

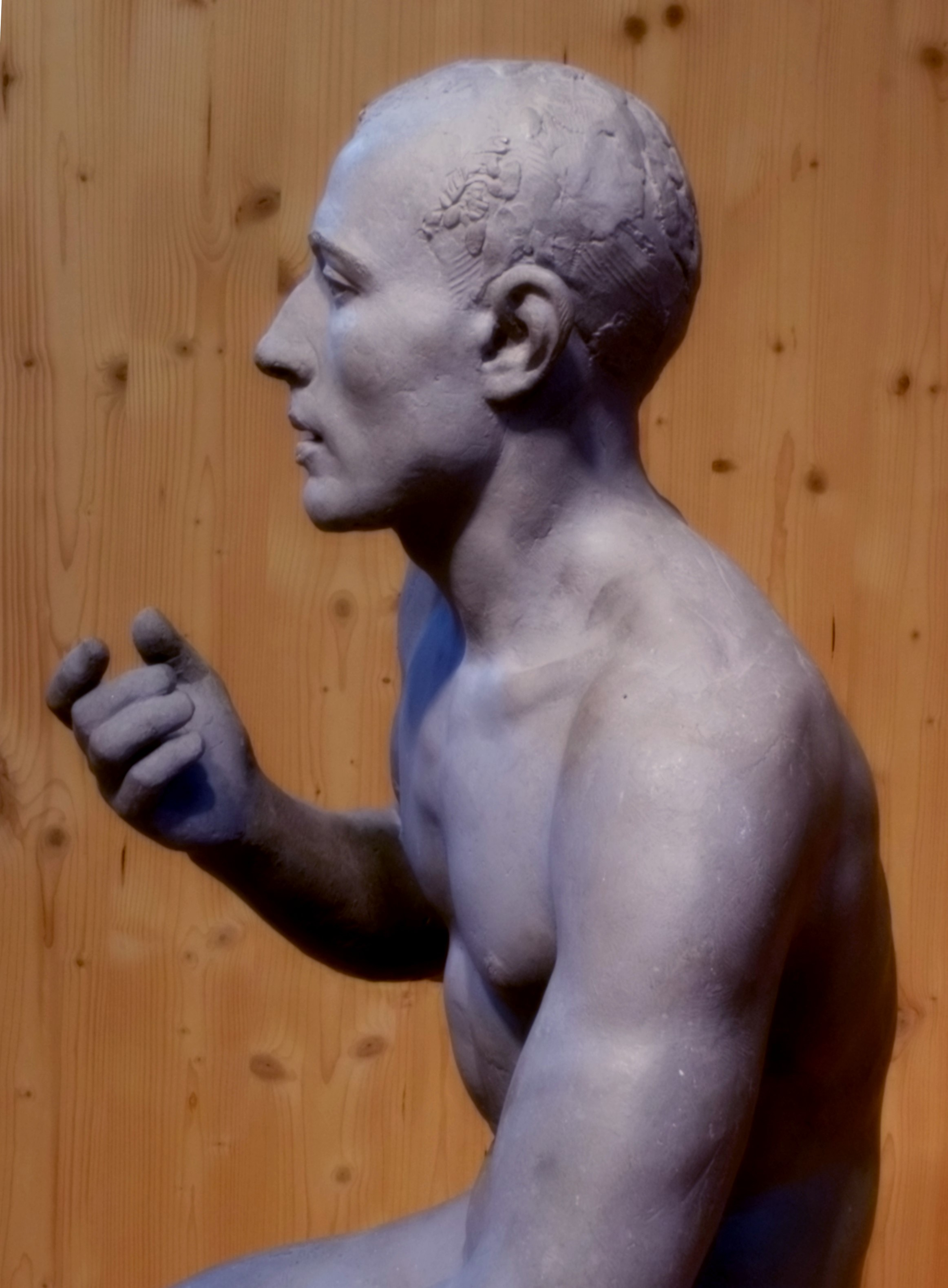
Grave figure of Fritz Fleiner (1867–1937)

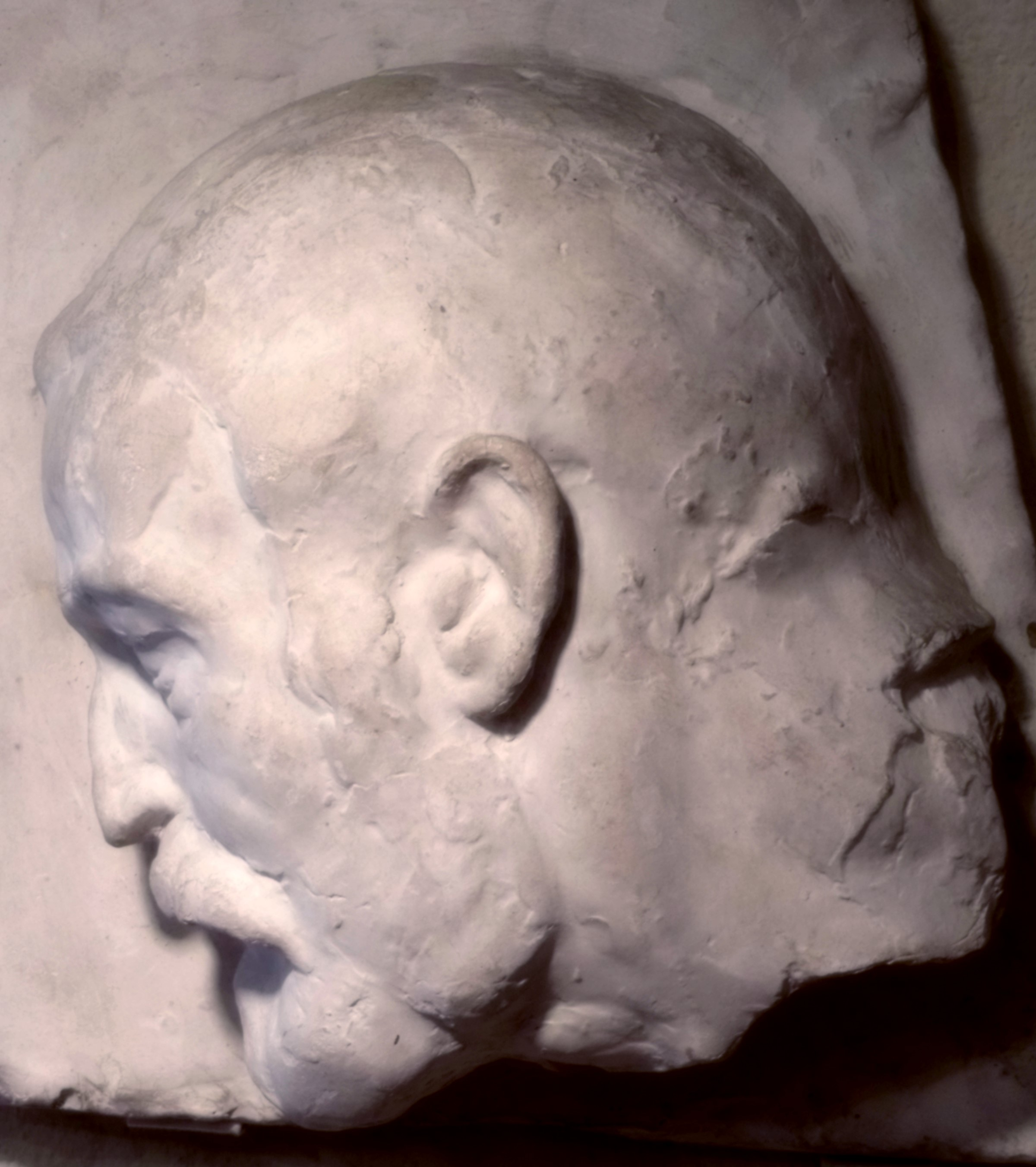
Plaster head of English painter Frank Budgen (1882–1971)

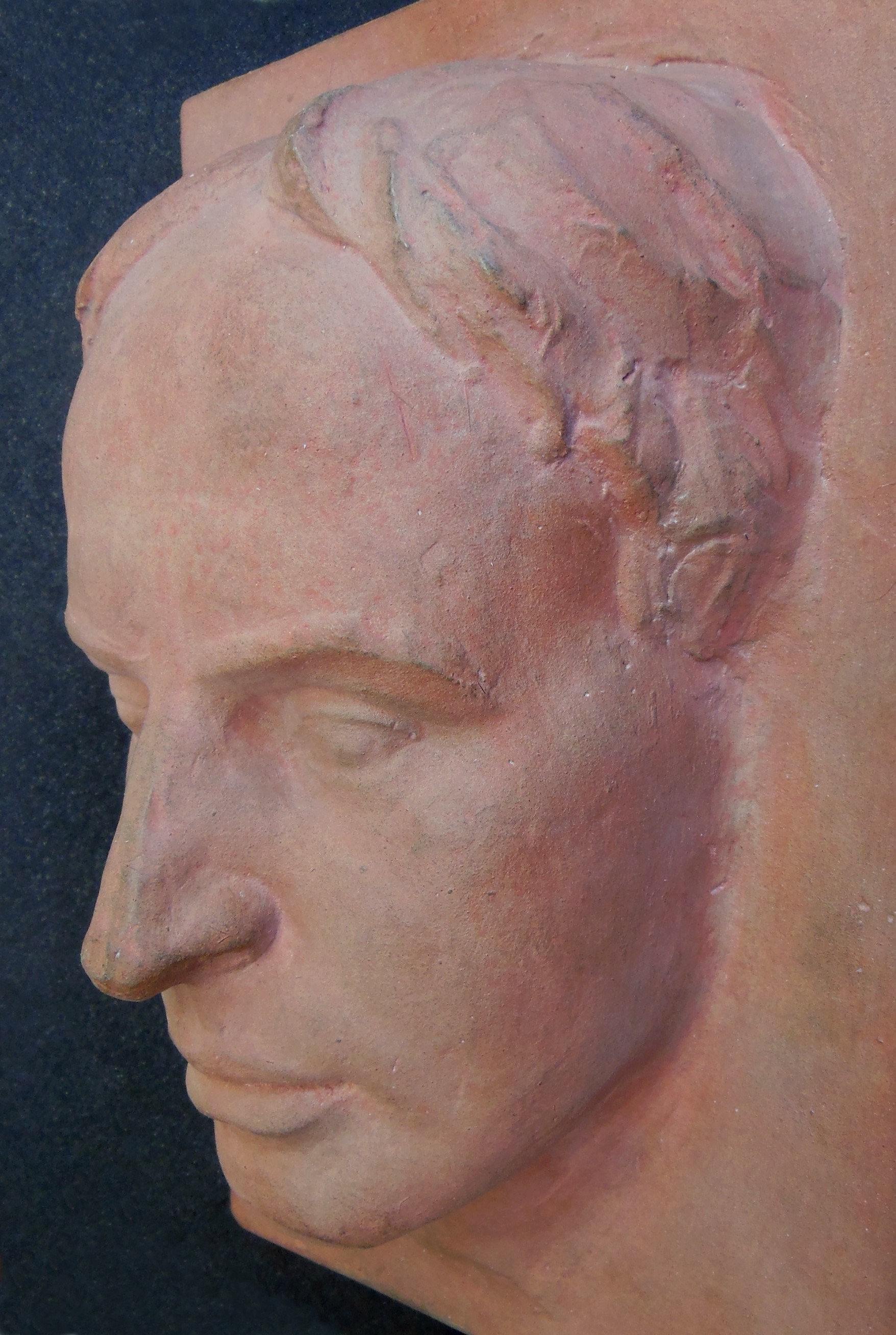
Clay head of Swiss writer Siegfried Lang (1887–1970)

== Bibliography ==
- Beck, Harald, "James Joyce to August Suter – from writer to sculptor" in: James Joyce Online Notes, issue 9, 2015
- Birkhäuser, Kaspar, ed., Personenlexikon des Kantons Basel-Landschaft, 1997, pp. 150–151
- Budgen, Frank, Myselves When Young, London 1970
- Gantner-Schlee, Hildegard, Leaflet of the August-Suter-Museum at Eptingen
- Jedlicka, Gotthard, "Der Bildhauer August Suter" in Das Werk, Vol. 14, 1927
- Lang, Siegfried, "Der Bildhauer August Suter", in Baselbieter Heimatbuch, 9, 1962, pp. 19–32 (includes a list of works)
