= Kiril Kadiiski =

Bulgarian poet and translator (1947–2025)

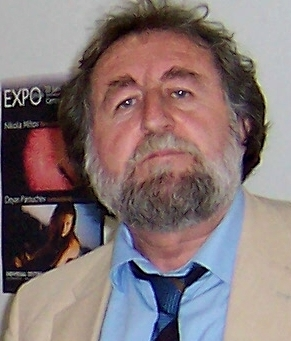

Kiril Kadiiski (Bulgarian: Кирил Кадийски; 16 June 1947 – 31 August 2025) was a Bulgarian poet, essayist and translator. He was well known as a translator inside his native Bulgaria and is famous as a poet in France where he was director of the Bulgarian Cultural Institute. He was also awarded a number of Bulgarian and international prizes: Ivan Franko (Ukraine) in 1989, the European Grand Prize (Romania) in 2001 and the Max Jacobs International Poetry Prize for his collected works (France) in 2002. He was awarded the title Knight of the Order of Arts and Letters for achievements in the field of French culture by the French Government.

In 1995 Kadiiski announced his discovery in Sofia of the lost poem of Blaise Cendrars La Légende de Novgorode, the bona-fides of which is now in full dispute.

Kadiiski died on 31 August 2025, at the age of 78.
