= La main coupée =

1946 French novel by Blaise Cendrars

- Author: Blaise Cendrars
- Language: French
- Series: Blaise Cendrars memoir tetralogy
- Genre: War memoir
- Set in: 1914–1915, Western Front (World War I)
- Published: 1946
- Publisher: Denoël, Dufour Editions
- English publication date: June 1, 1973
- Media type: Print
- Pages: 328
- ISBN: 9780450019647
- Preceded by: The Astonished Man
- Followed by: Bourlinguer

La main coupée (lit. 'The Severed Hand') is a semi-autobiographical war memoir by Swiss-born writer Blaise Cendrars (1887–1961), first published in 1946. It has been published in English as Lice (1973) and as The Bloody Hand (2014). The book recounts Cendrars’s experiences as a foreign volunteer in the French Army during the early years of the First World War. It is composed as a sequence of episodic portraits and anecdotes depicting daily life at the front, including trench warfare, patrols, encounters with military bureaucracy, and interactions with fellow soldiers.

== Background ==
Cendrars was a Swiss national and enlisted in the French Foreign Legion under a false name in 1914. He served until September 28, 1915, when he was wounded and lost his right arm. Lice was written thirty years later, between 1944 and 1946. Lice is the second volume in Cendrars’s tetralogy of memoirs, following The Astonished Man (1945) and preceding Bourlinguer (1948). The series concludes with Sky Memoirs (1949).

== Plot summary ==
The narrative follows Cendrars after he enlists in the French Foreign Legion and is deployed to the Western Front. The book does not follow a single continuous narrative or conventional plot arc. Instead, it is structured as a series of episodic vignettes, loosely ordered chronologically, beginning with his time at the Second Battle of Artois.

The narrative depicts daily life at the front through short scenes focused on patrols, trench life, improvised missions, moments of boredom, fear, and camaraderie, as well as his recurring conflicts with French military bureaucracy. Rather than emphasizing large-scale battles, Cendrars concentrates on the physical and psychological conditions of soldiers and the distinctive personalities of the men with whom he serves. Many chapters function as portraits of individual comrades, whose actions and quirks illustrate the brutality and randomness of wartime experience.

== Characters ==
- Robert Bellesort – A young man from Tours, exiled to Canada following a dispute with his uncle and guardian. He frequently speaks of his twin sister and becomes close friends with Ségouâna.
- Bikoff – A taciturn Russian soldier and skilled marksman who does not speak French. Wounded at Bois de la Vache and eventually takes his own life after losing his sight.
- Garnero – A fearless soldier described as an excellent cook and marksman.
- Kupka – The Czech painter František Kupka, portrayed as an older volunteer with high morale but fragile health, eventually discharged due to frostbite.
- Przybyszewski – Nicknamed “Monoclard,” a self-styled Polish prince depicted as unreliable and cowardly.
- Rossi – An Italian strongman known for his physical endurance and solitary habits.
- Ségouâna – A wealthy and eccentric soldier, an expert marksman and close companion of Bellesort.
- Captain Jacottet – The commanding officer of Cendrars' company, he maintains an informal relationship with Cendrars and is portrayed as showing a degree of good humor toward the soldiers.

== Analysis ==
The historians Jean-Jacques Becker and Stéphane Audoin-Rouzeau describe Lice as an "absolutely unclassifiable" outlier among World War One memoirs, because Cendrars combines two narrative tendencies which are usually mutually exclusive: an anti-heroic critique of war, and a dehumanizing hatred of the enemy.

== Editions ==
- Cendrars, Blaise. La Main coupée. Paris: Denoël, 1946.
- Cendrars, Blaise. Lice. Translated by Nina Rootes. New York: Dufour Editions, 1973.
- Cendrars, Blaise. The Bloody Hand. Translated by Graham macLachlan. Éditions Vagamundo, 2014.
