= Moravagine =

Book by Blaise Cendrars

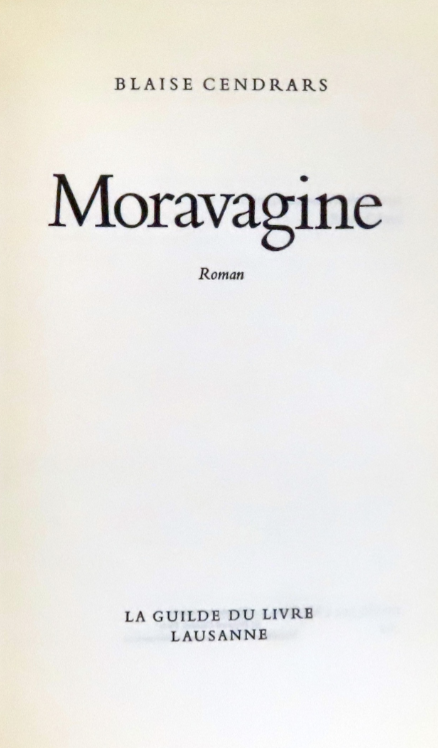
- Author: Blaise Cendrars
- Original title: Moravagine
- Publisher: Grasset
- Publication date: 1926
- Publication place: France

Moravagine is a 1926 novel by Blaise Cendrars, originally published by Grasset. It is a complex opus with a central figure, the eponymous Moravagine, who emerges as a doppelganger of the author whom the author is ridding himself of through the act of writing. It took Cendrars a decade to write the book (Cendrars makes reference to it as early as 1917), and he never stopped working on it. In 1956, the author partially rewrote the text and added a postface, as well as a section titled "Pro domo: How I wrote Moravagine". In his final revision, Cendrars says the book is definitely incomplete, as it was meant to be a preface to a "complete works of Moravagine" that do not exist.

== Synopsis ==
The narrator, Raymond la Science, is presented as an acquaintance of Blaise Cendrars, who himself appears in the novel. The narrator is a physician, and he recounts his meeting with Moravagine, a deranged murderer detained in an asylum. Moravagine is the last, degenerate heir to a long line of Eastern European noblemen. Fascinated by this man, the physician helps him escape, then recounts his picaresque journey around the world, encountering everyone from Russian terrorists to American natives and leaving behind a trail of crimes. In the end, they return to Europe just in time for World War I, when "the whole world was doing a Moravagine."

== Style, Death, and Women ==
While the plot is adventurous, the style is subdued and controlled (as opposed to, for instance, Journey to the End of the Night). This contrast contributes to the peculiar feelings some readers have when reading the novel.

"Moravagine" sounds in French like "mort-a-vagin", or in English, "death-has-vagina" or "death-to-vagina". Indeed, Moravagine kills women: part of chapter I (about a woman named Masha) reads:

La femme est sous le signe de la lune, ce reflet, cet astre mort, et c'est pourquoi plus la femme enfante, plus elle engendre la mort.

Woman is under the sign of the moon, this reflection, this dead star, and that is why the more Woman gives birth, the more she engenders death.

The cover of the New York Review Books Classics edition ( ISBN 978-1590170632 ) features a skeleton in feminine clothing.

Cendrars was keenly aware that Moravagine was a kind of doppelganger of himself. In pro domo, he wrote:

J'ai nourri, élevé un parasite à mes dépens. A la fin je ne savais plus qui de nous plagiait l'autre. Il a voyagé à ma place. Il a fait l'amour à ma place. Mais il n'y a jamais eu réelle identification car chacun était soi, moi et l'Autre. Tragique tête-à-tête qui fait que l'on ne peut écrire qu'un livre ou plusieurs fois le même livre. C'est pourquoi tous les beaux livres se ressemblent. Ils sont tous autobiographiques. C'est pourquoi il y a un seul sujet littéraire: l'homme. C'est pourquoi il n'y a qu'une littérature: celle de cet homme, de cet Autre, l'homme qui écrit.

I fed and raised a parasite at my expense. In the end, I no longer knew who was plagiarizing the other. He traveled in my place. He made love in my place. But there was never a real identification, because each one was self, me and the Other. It is a tragic tête-à-tête that makes it possible to write only one book, or the same book multiple times. That is why all good books are alike. They are all autobiographical. This is why there is only one literary subject: man. And it is why there is only one literature: the literature of this man, this Other, the man who writes.

== Inspirations ==
The following have been cited as real people who may have been used as models:

- Otto Gross, physician and psychoanalyst
- Adolf Wölfli (1864–1930), a violent psychotic inmate at Waldau's Asylum near Bern, known for his prolific Outsider art work.
- Favez, nicknamed "Ropraz's Vampire", a Swiss felon whom Cendrars may have met during World War I while in the French army.

== Editions ==
- Moravagine, Paris, Grasset, 1926.
- Moravagine, Paris, Le Club français du livre, 1947.
- Moravagine, Paris, Grasset, 1956. Édition revue et augmentée de "Pro domo : comment j'ai écrit Moravagine" et d'une postface.
- Moravagine, Paris, Le Livre de Poche, 1957.
- Moravagine, Lausanne, La Guilde du Livre, 1961 (version de 1926).
- Moravagine, Paris, Club des Amis du Livre, avant-propos de Claude Roy, illustrations de Pierre Chaplet, 1961.
- Moravagine, dans Œuvres complètes, t. II, Paris, Denoël, 1961.
- Moravagine, Lausanne, Éditions Rencontre, 1969.
- Moravagine, dans Œuvres complètes, t. IV, Paris, Le Club français du livre, 1969. Préface de Raymond Dumay.
- Moravagine, Paris, Grasset, coll. "Les Cahiers rouges", 1983.
- Moravagine, Paris, Denoël, coll. "Tout autour d'aujourd'hui", t. 7, 2003. Moravagine est suivi de La Fin du monde filmée par l'Ange N.-D, "Le Mystère de l'Ange Notre-Dame", et de L'Eubage. Textes présentés et annotés par Jean-Carlo Flückiger.

== Critics references ==
- Flückiger, Jean-Carlo, Au cœur du texte. Essai sur Blaise Cendrars, Neuchâtel, À la Baconnière, 1977.
- Touret, Michèle, Blaise Cendrars. Le désir du roman (1920-1930), Paris, Champion, coll. "Cahiers Blaise Cendrars", n° 6, 1999.
- Sous le signe de Moravagine (études réunies par Jean-Carlo Flückiger et Claude Leroy), Paris-Caen, Minard-Lettres modernes, série "Blaise Cendrars", n° 6, 2006.

=== Studies ===
- Oxana Khlopina, Moravagine de Blaise Cendrars, Bienne-Gollion/Paris, ACEL-Infolio éditions, collection Le cippe, 2012.
