= Sonia Delaunay =

French artist (1885–1979)

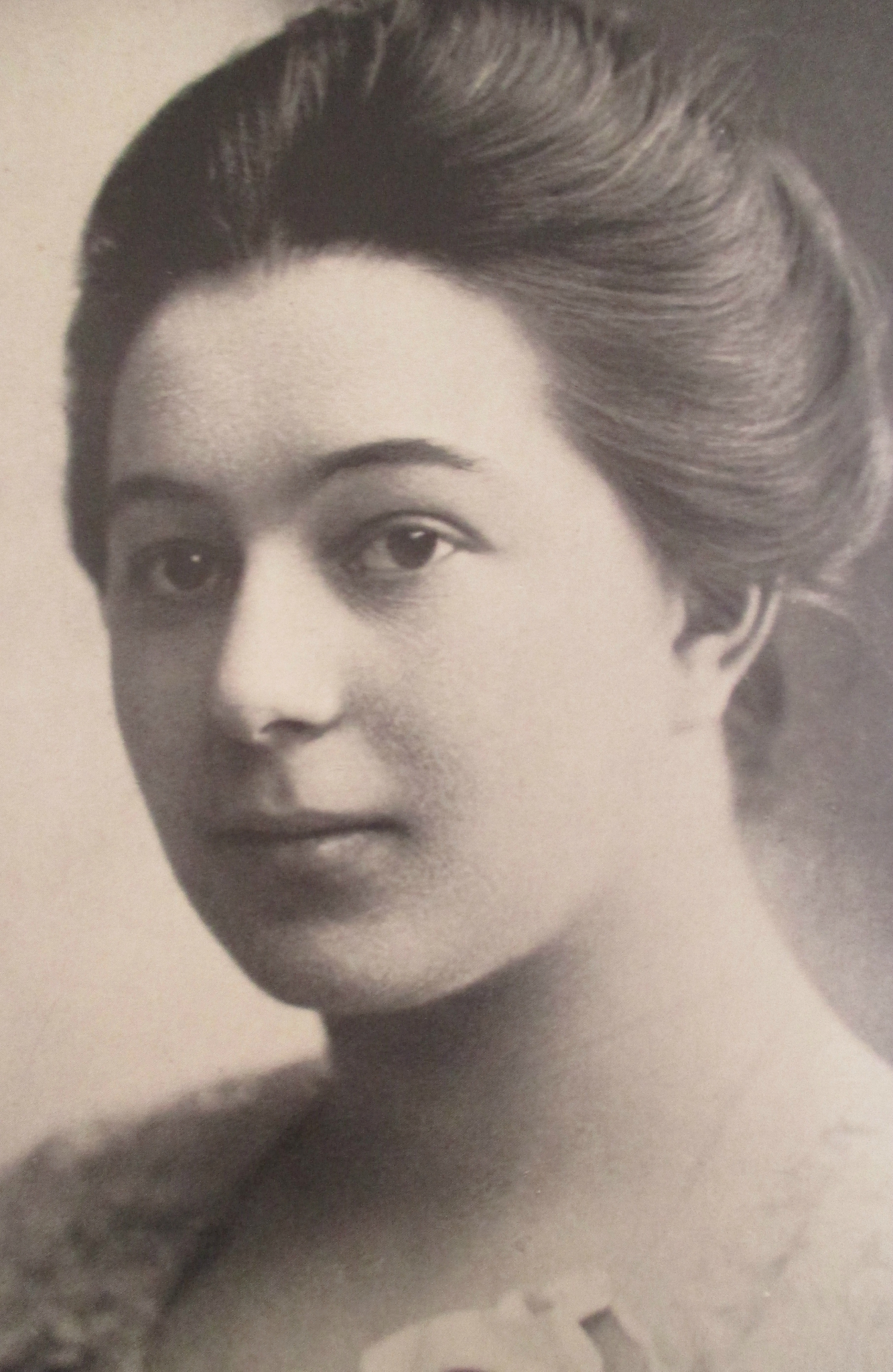
- Sonia Terk, c.1912
- Born: Sarah Elievna Shtern; 14 November 1885; Hradyzk, or Odesa, Russian Empire
- Died: 5 December 1979 (aged 94); Paris, France
- Known for: Painting
- Movement: Orphism, School of Paris

Sonia Delaunay (née Stern, French: [sɔnja dəlonɛ]; 14 November 1885 – 5 December 1979) was a French artist born to Jewish parents, who spent most of her working life in Paris. She was born in the Russian Empire, now Ukraine, and was formally trained in Russia and Germany, before moving to France and expanding her practice to include textile, fashion, and set design. She was part of the School of Paris and co-founded the Orphism art movement, noted for its use of strong colours and geometric shapes, with her husband Robert Delaunay and others. She was the first living female artist to have a retrospective exhibition at the Louvre in 1964, and in 1975 was named an officer of the French Legion of Honor.

Her work in modern design included the concepts of geometric abstraction, and the integration of furniture, fabrics, wall coverings, and clothing into her art practice.

== Biography ==
=== Early life (1885–1904) ===
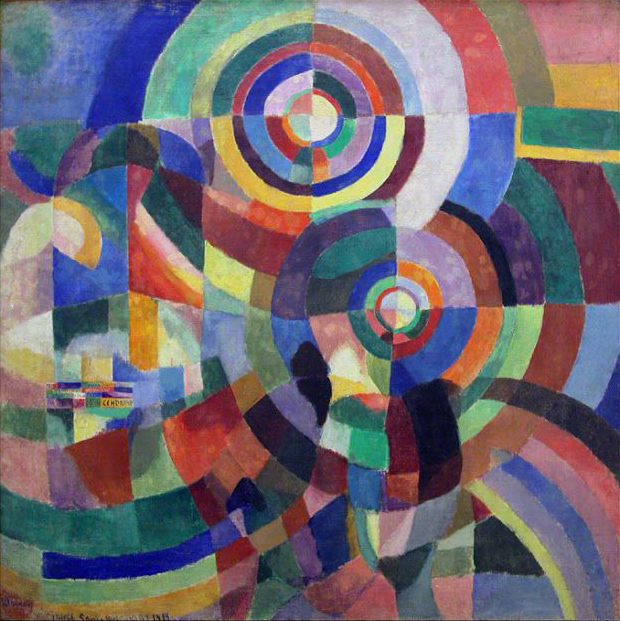
Sonia Delaunay, 1914, Prismes électriques, oil on canvas, 250 x 250 cm, Musée National d'Art Moderne, Centre Pompidou, Paris

Sonia Delaunay, Rythme, 1938, oil on canvas, 182 x 149 cm, Musée National d'Art Moderne, Paris

Sofia Ilinitchna Stern, or Sarah Elievna Stern was born on 14 November 1885 in Hradyzk, or in Odesa, both in Ukraine, then part of the Russian Empire, to poor Jewish parents. She was the youngest of three children. Her father was foreman of a nail factory. At five she was orphaned and moved to Saint Petersburg, Russian Empire (now Russia), where she was cared for by her mother's brother, Henri Terk. Henri, a successful and affluent lawyer, and his wife Anna wanted to adopt her but her mother would not allow it. Finally in 1890 she was adopted by the Terks. She assumed the name Sonia Terk and received a privileged upbringing. They spent their summers in Finland and travelled widely in Europe, introducing Sonia to art museums and galleries. When she was 16, she attended a well-regarded secondary school in St. Petersburg, where her skill at drawing was noted by her teacher. When she was 18, at her teacher's suggestion, she was sent to art school in Germany where she attended the Academy of Fine Arts in Karlsruhe. She studied in Germany until 1905 and then moved to Paris.

=== Paris (1905–1910) ===
When she arrived in Paris she enrolled at the Académie de La Palette in Montparnasse. Unhappy with the mode of teaching, which she thought was too critical, she spent less time at the Académie and more time in galleries around Paris. Her own work during this period was strongly influenced by the art she was viewing including the Post-Impressionist art of Van Gogh, Gauguin and Henri Rousseau and the Fauves including Matisse and Derain. In 1908 she entered into a "marriage of convenience" with German art dealer and gallery owner Wilhelm Uhde, allowing her access to her dowry, and giving Uhde cover for his homosexuality. Sonia Terk gained entrance into the art world via exhibitions at Uhde's gallery and benefited from his connections.

Comtesse de Rose, mother of Robert Delaunay, was a regular visitor to Uhde's gallery, sometimes accompanied by her son. Sonia Terk met Robert Delaunay in early 1909. They became lovers in April of that year and it was decided that she and Uhde should divorce. The divorce was finalised in August 1910. Sonia was pregnant and she and Robert married on 15 November 1910. Their son Charles was born on 18 January 1911. They were supported by an allowance sent from Sonia's aunt in St. Petersburg.

Sonia said about Robert: "In Robert Delaunay I found a poet. A poet who wrote not with words but with colours".

=== Orphism (1911–1913) ===
The last section of La prose du Transsibérien et de la Petite Jehanne de France, 1913

In 1911, Sonia Delaunay made a patchwork quilt for Charles's crib, which is now in the collection of the Musée National d'Art Moderne in Paris. This quilt was created spontaneously and uses geometry and colour.

"About 1911 I had the idea of making for my son, who had just been born, a blanket composed of bits of fabric like those I had seen in the houses of Ukrainian peasants. When it was finished, the arrangement of the pieces of material seemed to me to evoke cubist conceptions and we then tried to apply the same process to other objects and paintings." Sonia Delaunay

Contemporary art critics recognize this as the point where she moved away from perspective and naturalism in her art. Around the same time, cubist works were being shown in Paris and Robert had been studying the colour theories of Michel Eugène Chevreul; they called their experiments with colour in art and design simultanéisme. Simultaneous design occurs when one design, when placed next to another, affects both; this is similar to the theory of color (Pointillism, as used by Georges Seurat) in which primary color dots placed next to each other are "mixed" by the eye and affect each other. Sonia's first large-scale painting in this style was Bal Bullier (1912–13), a painting known for both its use of colour and movement. Other works from this time include her series of paintings entitled Simultaneous Contrasts.

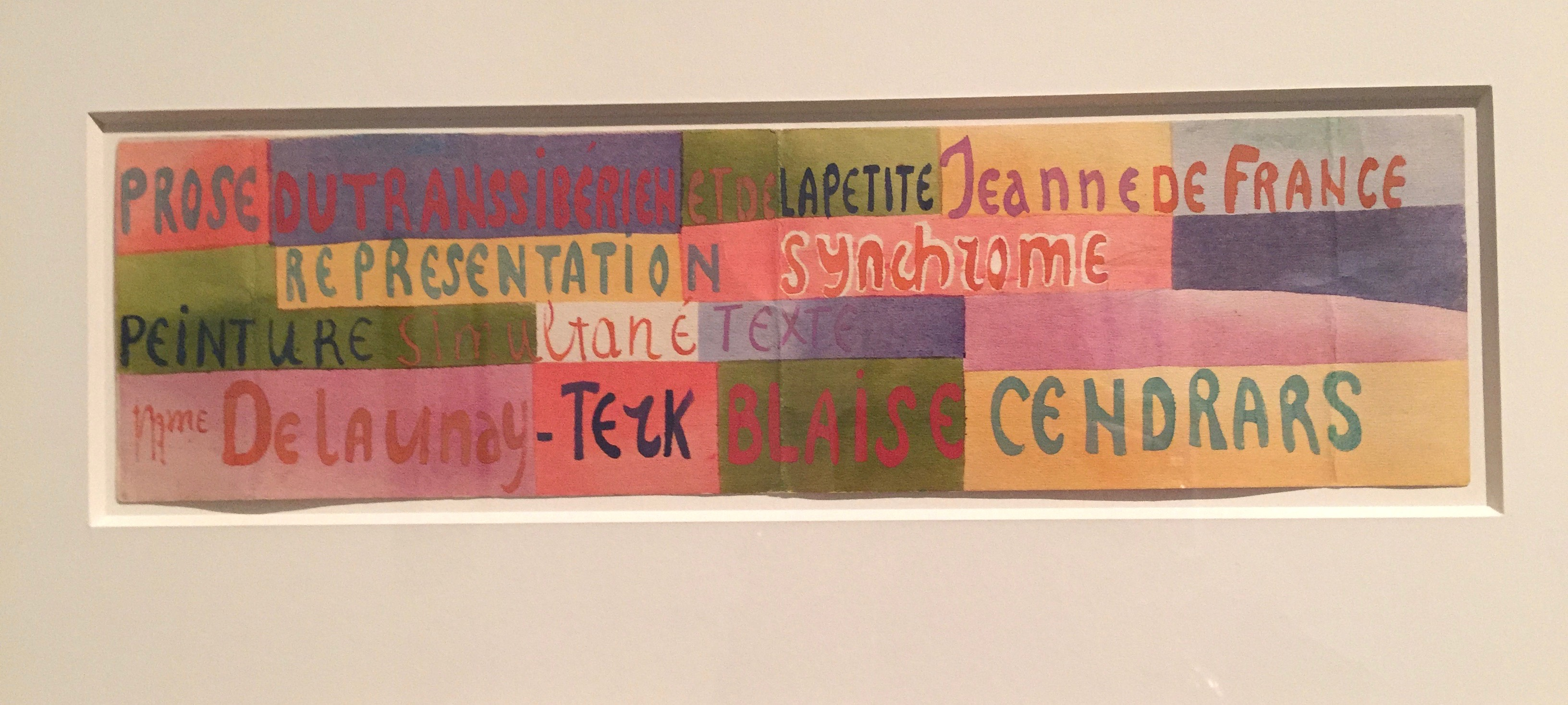
Prospectus for la Prose du Transsiberién et de la petite Jehanne de France, 1913, by Sonia Delaunay.

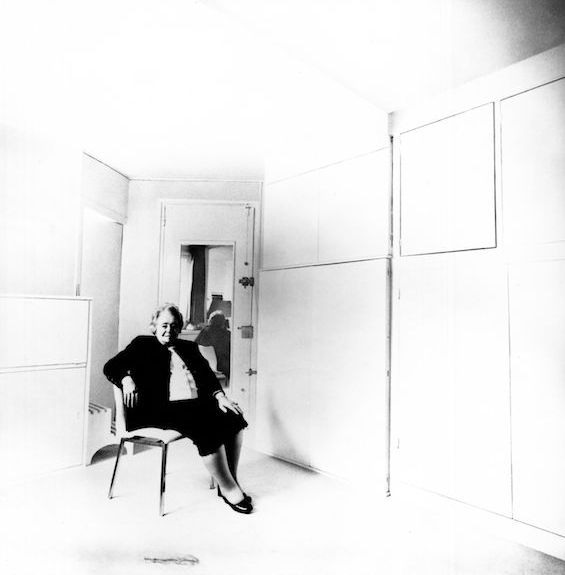
Sonia Delaunay by Lothar Wolleh, 1978

The Delaunays' friend, the poet and art critic Guillaume Apollinaire, coined the term Orphism to describe the Delaunays' version of Cubism in 1913. It was through Apollinaire that in 1912 Sonia met the poet Blaise Cendrars who was to become her friend and collaborator. Sonia Delaunay described in an interview that the discovery of Cendrars' work “gave me [her] a push, a shock.” She illustrated Cendrars' poem La prose du Transsibérien et de la Petite Jehanne de France (Prose of the Trans-Siberian and of Little Jehanne of France) about a journey on the Trans-Siberian Railway by creating a 2m-long accordion-pleated book. Using simultaneous design principles the book merged text and design. The book, which was sold almost entirely by subscription, created a stir amongst Paris critics. The simultaneous book was later shown at the Autumn Salon in Berlin in 1913, along with paintings and other applied artworks such as dresses, and it is said that Paul Klee was so impressed with her use of squares in her binding of Cendrars' poem that they became an enduring feature in his own work.

=== Spanish and Portuguese years (1914–1920) ===
Sonia Delaunay or Robert Delaunay (or both), 1922, published in Der Sturm, Volume 13, Number 3, 5 March 1922

The Delaunays travelled to Spain in 1914, staying with friends in Madrid. At the outbreak of the First World War in 1914 Sonia and Robert were staying in Hondarribia, in the Basque Country, with their son still in Madrid. They decided not to return to France. In August 1915 they moved to Portugal, where they shared a home with Samuel Halpert and Eduardo Viana. They discussed an artistic partnership with Viana and their friends Amadeo de Souza-Cardoso, whom the Delaunays had already met in Paris, and José de Almada Negreiros. In Portugal she painted Marché au Minho (Market in Minho, 1916), which she later says was "inspired by the beauty of the country". Sonia had a solo exhibition in Stockholm (1916).

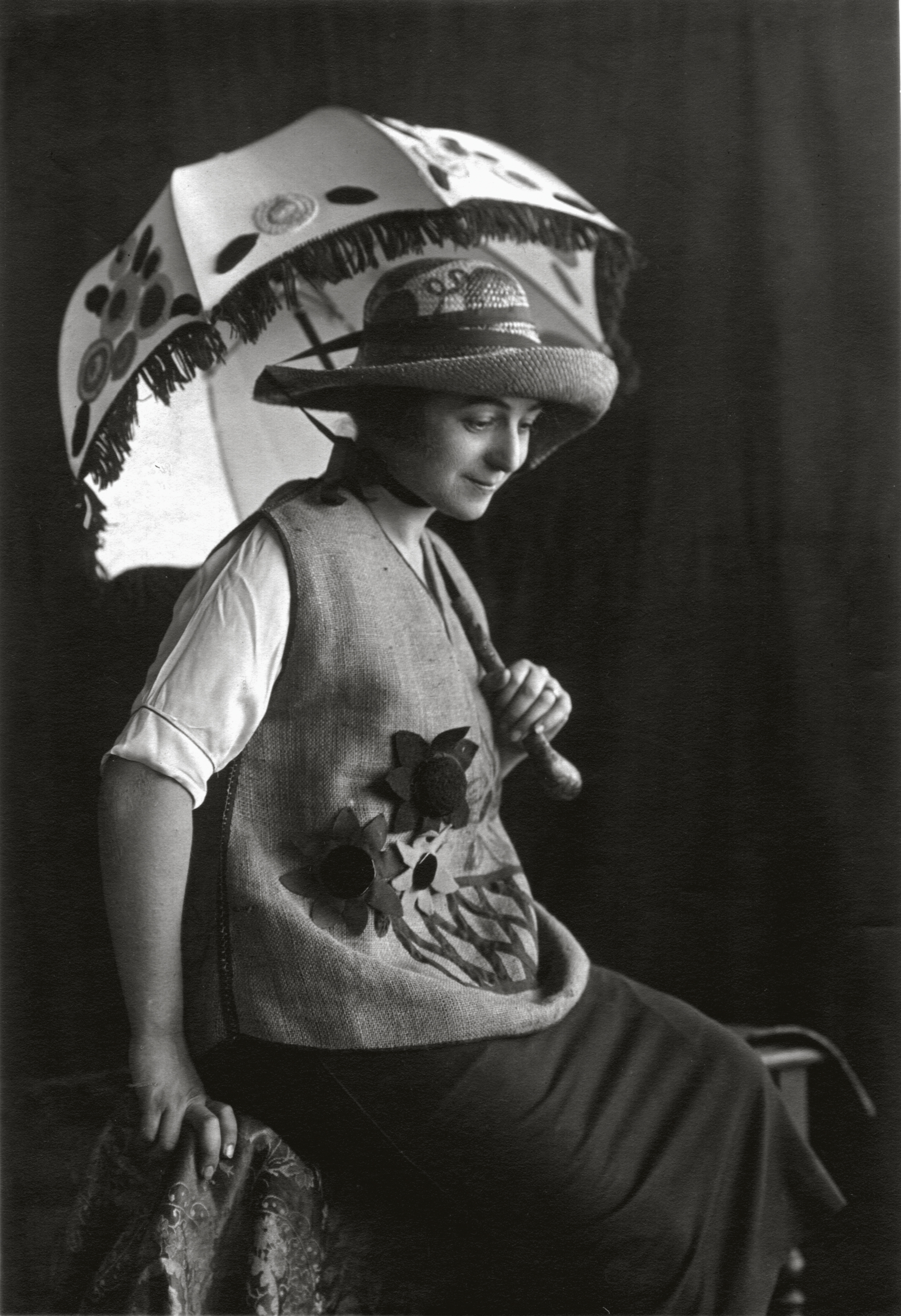
Sonia Delaunay wearing Casa Sonia creations, Madrid, c.1920

The Russian Revolution brought an end to the financial support Sonia received from her family in Russia, and a different source of income was needed. In 1917 the Delaunays met Sergei Diaghilev in Madrid. Sonia designed costumes for his production of Cleopatra (stage design by Robert Delaunay) and for the performance of Aida in Barcelona. In Madrid she decorated the Petit Casino (a nightclub) and founded Casa Sonia, selling her designs for interior decoration and fashion, with a branch in Bilbao. She was the center of a Madrid Salon.

Sonia Delaunay travelled to Paris twice in 1920 looking for opportunities in the fashion business, and in August she wrote a letter to Paul Poiret stating she wanted to expand her business and include some of his designs. Poiret declined, claiming she had copied designs from his Ateliers de Martine and was married to a French deserter (Robert). Galerie der Sturm in Berlin showed works by Sonia and Robert from their Portuguese period the same year.

=== Return to Paris (1921–1944) ===
Sonia, Robert and their son Charles returned to Paris permanently in 1921 and moved into Boulevard Malesherbes 19. The Delaunays' most acute financial problems were solved when they sold Henri Rousseau's La Charmeuse de serpents (The Snake Charmer) to Jacques Doucet. Sonia Delaunay made clothes for private clients and friends, and in 1923 created fifty fabric designs using geometrical shapes and bold colours, commissioned by a manufacturer from Lyon. Soon after, she started her own business and simultané became her registered trademark.

For the 1923 staging of Tristan Tzara's play Le Cœur à Gaz she designed the set and costumes. In 1924 she opened a fashion studio together with Jacques Heim. Her customers included Nancy Cunard, Gloria Swanson, Lucienne Bogaert and Gabrielle Dorziat.

With Heim she had a pavilion at the 1925 Exposition Internationale des Arts Décoratifs et Industriels Modernes, called boutique simultané. Sonia Delaunay gave a lecture at the Sorbonne on the influence of painting on fashion.

"If there are geometric forms, it is because these simple and manageable elements have appeared suitable for the distribution of colors whose relations constitute the real object of our search, but these geometric forms do not characterize our art. The distribution of colors can be effected as well with complex forms, such as flowers, etc. ... only the handling of these would be a little more delicate."

— Sonia Delaunay, speaking at the Sorbonne, 1927

Sonia designed costumes for two films: Le Vertige directed by Marcel L'Herbier and Le p'tit Parigot, directed by René Le Somptier, and designed some furniture for the set of the 1929 film Parce que je t'aime (Because I love you). During this period, she also designed haute couture textiles for Robert Perrier, while participating actively in his artistic salon, R-26. The Great Depression caused a decline in business. After closing her business, Sonia Delaunay returned to painting, but she still designed for Jacques Heim, Metz & Co, Perrier and private clients. She said "the depression liberated her from business". 1935 the Delaunays moved to rue Saint-Simon 16.

By the end of 1934 Sonia was working on designs for the 1937 Exposition Internationale des Arts et Techniques dans la Vie Moderne, for which she and Robert worked together on decorating two pavilions: the Pavillon des Chemins de Fer and the Palais de l'Air. Sonia however did not want to be part of the contract for the commission, but chose to help Robert if she wanted. She said "I am free and mean to remain so." The murals and painted panels for the exhibition were executed by fifty artists including Albert Gleizes, Léopold Survage, Jacques Villon, Roger Bissière and Jean Crotti.

Robert Delaunay died of cancer in October 1941.

=== Later life (1945 – 1979) ===
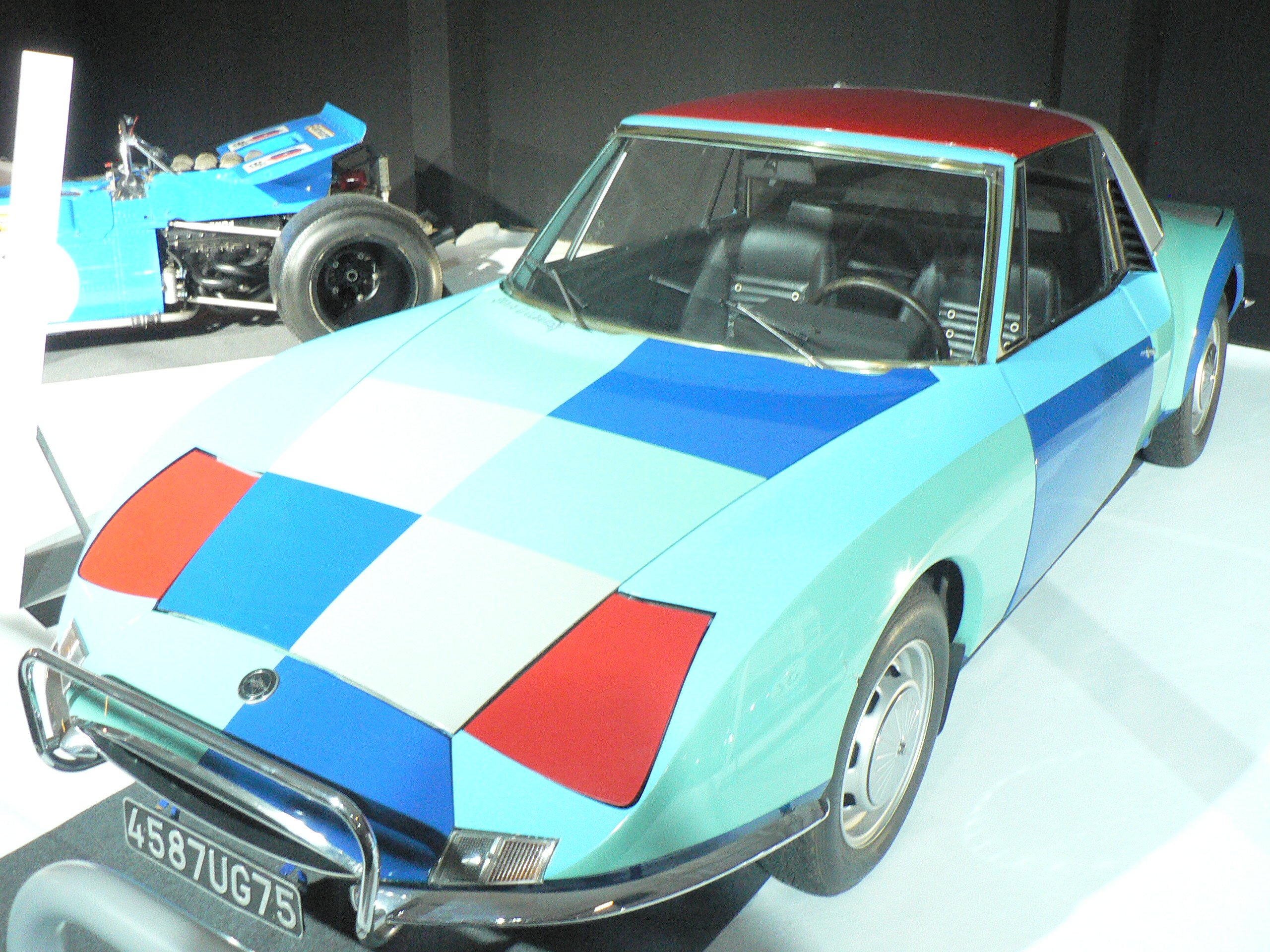
Matra M530A painted by Sonia Delaunay

After the World War II, Sonia was a board member of the Salon des Réalités Nouvelles for several years. Sonia and her son Charles in 1964 donated 114 works by Sonia and Robert to the Musée National d'Art Moderne. Alberto Magnelli told her "she and Braque were the only living painters to have been shown at the Louvre". In 1966 she published Rythmes-Couleurs (colour-rhythms), with 11 of her gouaches reproduced as pochoirs and texts by Jacques Damase, and in 1969 Robes poèmes (poem-dresses), also with texts by Jacques Damase containing 27 pochoirs. For Matra, she decorated a Matra 530. In 1975 Sonia was named an officer of the French Legion of Honor. From 1976 she developed a range of textiles, tableware and jewellery with French company Artcurial, inspired by her work from the 1920s. Her autobiography, Nous irons jusqu'au soleil (We shall go up to the sun) was published in 1978.

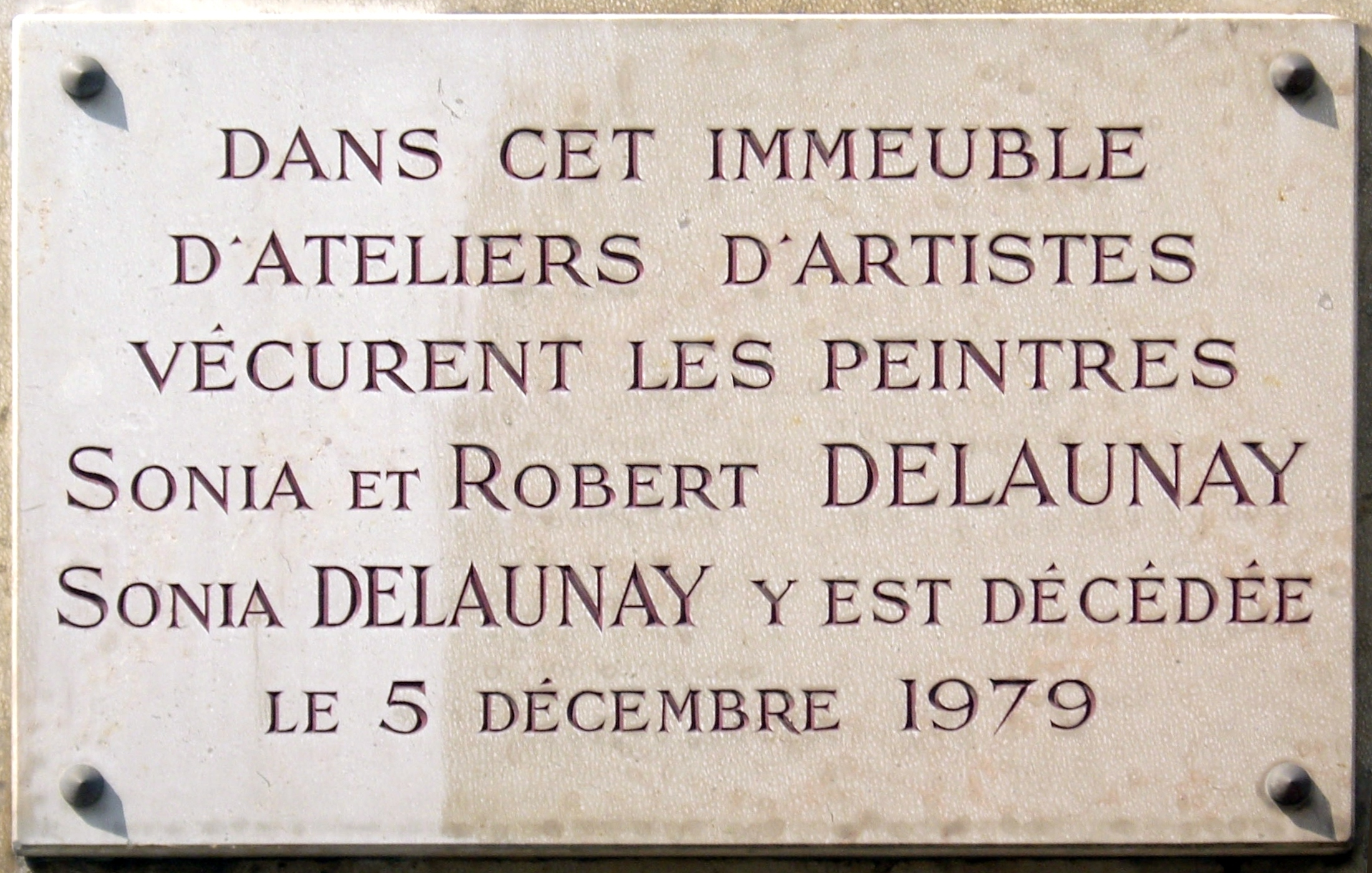
Plaque at 16 rue Saint-Simon where the Delaunays lived and where Sonia died

In 1967 (25 February – 5 April) she was a part of an exhibition of artist-decorated cars entitled 'Cinq voitures personnalisées par cinq artistes contemporains' ('Five Cars Personalized by Five Contemporary Artists') organized by the journal Réalités as a fundraiser for French medical research. She designed the pattern for a Matra 530 by experimenting with optical effects causing the car to recompose the pattern into a light blue shade when in motion 'so as not to attract other drivers' attention to the point of causing accidents through distraction.'

Sonia Delaunay died 5 December 1979, in Paris, aged 94. She was buried in Gambais, next to Robert Delaunay's grave.

Her son, Charles Delaunay, became an expert in jazz music during the 1930s. He was a jazz critic, organizer of jazz concerts and a founder of the Hot Club of France (the first jazz club in France) and the first editor of Jazz Hot Magazine, the club's official publication.

== Legacy ==
Delaunay's painting Coccinelle was featured on a stamp jointly released by the French Post Office, La Poste and the United Kingdom's Royal Mail in 2004 to commemorate the centenary of the Entente Cordiale.

US fashion designer Perry Ellis devoted his fall 1984 collection to Delaunay, producing knits and prints in Delaunay colors and patterns.

There is a tapestry by Delaunay, dated 1969, in the collection of the Institut Français, in London.

== Retrospectives ==
Aberbach Fine Art, 988 Madison Avenue, January - February 1974.

Sonia Delaunay was one of the artists presented in the retrospective group exhibition Dada is Dada at Bildmuseet, Umeå University, Sweden (17 November 2017 to 20 May 2018).

From 23 February to 7 July 2024, the Bard Graduate Center exhibited Sonia Delaunay Living Art. The exhibit focused on “her virtuosic sense of color and form, and more on the diversity of her practice and breadth of her artistic output.”
