= La prose du Transsibérien et de la Petite Jehanne de France =

1913 artists' book

Sonia Delaunay, Blaise Cendrars, 1913, La Prose du Transsibérien et de la petite Jehanne de France, illustrated book with watercolor applied through pochoir and relief print on paper, 200 x 35.6 cm, Princeton University Art Museum

La prose du Transsibérien et de la Petite Jehanne de France (Prose of the Trans-Siberian and of Little Jehanne of France) is a collaborative artists' book by Blaise Cendrars and Sonia Delaunay. The book features a poem by Cendrars about a journey through Russia on the Trans-Siberian Express in 1905, during the first Russian Revolution, interlaced with an almost-abstract pochoir print by Delaunay-Terk. The work, published in 1913, is considered a milestone in the evolution of artist's books as well as modernist poetry and abstract art.

The publisher of a 2008 reprint of the book has called it "one of the most beautiful books ever created". Cendrars himself referred to the work as ‘a sad poem printed on sunlight’.

== Cendrars and the New Man Press ==
Blaise Cendrars was the nom-de-plume for Fréderic Louis Sauser, a play on Braise (ember) and Cendres (ash); 'writing is being burned alive, but it also means being reborn from the ashes'. Born in Switzerland, at 15 he had run away from home to train as an apprentice jeweller in St Petersburg, but continued to travel, including an important stay in New York where he wrote his first major poem Les Pâques à New York, 1912, before settling in Paris.

Once in Paris, he started a small press, Éditions des Hommes Nouveaux (New Man Editions) with the help of an anarchist who owned a clandestine printing press at the Mouzaïa Quarter, 19th arrondissement. His first edition, 125 copies of Les Pâques à New York, was published October 1912. Despite failing to sell a single copy, he pressed ahead with the second book, La prose du Transsibérien, published June 1913 (see 1913 in poetry). Intended as an edition of 150, only 60 copies were printed, of which about 30 are thought to survive. The book, a series of 4 sheets glued together in an accordion-style binding, measures 199 cm tall when unfolded; the height of all 150 end to end would have equalled the height of the Eiffel Tower, a potent symbol of modernity at the time, and referenced in both the poem and the print.

"[The poem] describes the 16-year old poet’s epic, perhaps imaginary, train journey from Moscow to Harbin (in Mongolia) during the Russo-Japanese War and the Russian Revolution of 1905. The route is shown on the contemporary map printed at the top right of the sheet. It is a long, oppressive ride through Russia with apocalyptic scenes of war and revolution, and descriptions of cold, hunger, death and devastation which worsen as the train follows its eastward course and are punctuated by the repeated, melancholy question of Jehanne, the poet's companion, "Dis Blaise, sommes nous bien loin de Montmartre?" (Blaise, are we very far from Montmartre?')" Chris Michaelides

The book is an early example of the deliberate use of multiple fonts - twelve in all - in different sizes and colours to suggest movement and differing moods, contemporaneous to similar experiments by the Italian futurists. It is also unusual for 'defying the codex form' and for placing the images on an equal footing to the text; they run parallel and complementary to the text, rather than as illustrative or decorative additions.

== Simultaneity and the Parisian Avant-Garde ==
Cover of La prose du Transsibérien et de la Petite Jehanne de France 1913

The last section of La prose du Transsibérien et de la Petite Jehanne de France featuring the Eiffel Tower, 1913

It was through Guillaume Apollinaire, a mutual friend, that Cendrars was to meet Sonia Delaunay and her husband Robert, members of the Parisian avant-garde, leading exponents of cubism, and inventors of the term Simultaneity.

The Delaunays had coined the word from their study of Chevreul's laws of simultaneous contrast. This new style had first appeared in April 1912 with Robert Delaunay's series of paintings of Fenêtres (Windows) followed closely by Sonia's abstract Contrastes Simultanés and was boldly taken up by both husband and wife for the rest of their careers.

"The intensity of the colour field is heightened in accordance with the law of simultaneous contrast: orange seen next to green becomes more red, while green seen next to orange appears more blue. These constant two-way influences create an unusual vibration in the eye of the viewer. Delaunay read this phenomenon as movement and rhythm and understood it as the painting appropriate to a modern society in motion."

The series of Windows, with their use of the Eiffel Tower as the central theme, were a direct influence on Sonia's contributions to the poem; again, the eye was supposed to move between elements of the picture and the words creating a sensation of speed and disorientation that echoed the poem's theme of travel. The book is contained in a wrapper which declares it the "first simultaneous book'. It also contains a map of Siberia at the beginning of the book, showing the route of the train journey.

== Reception of the Book ==
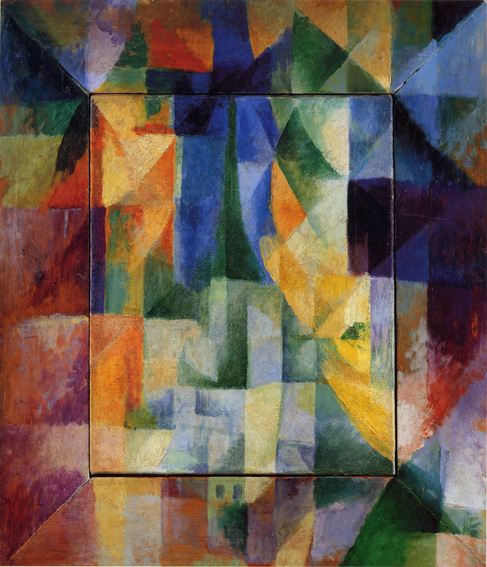
Simultaneous Windows on the City, 1912, by Robert Delaunay, Hamburger Kunsthalle

When published, the book was to cause a sensation in the avant-garde circles in Paris. Many, if not most, of the surviving copies are now held by major museums and libraries, including the V&A, Tate Modern, MoMA, Minneapolis Institute of Art, Hermitage, Swiss National Library, New York Public Library, Getty Research Institute, the Harry Ransom Center at the University of Texas, and Biblioteca Mário de Andrade in São Paulo, where it was exhibited in November 2022.

It is often exhibited framed, removing it from its origins as an artist's book. Copies are also occasionally referred to as unique paintings.
