= Blaise Cendrars =

Swiss-born novelist and poet (1887–1961)

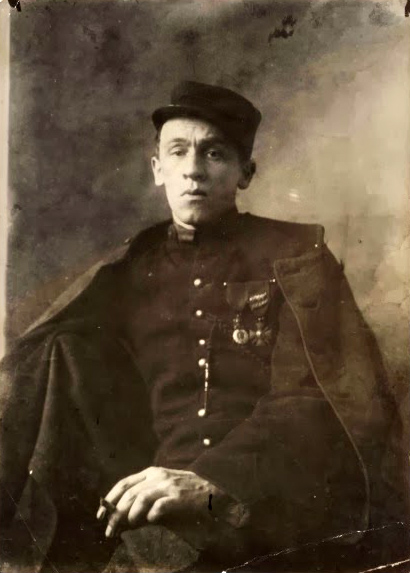
- Cendrars posing in the uniform of the Légion étrangère in 1916, a few months after the amputation of his right arm
- Born: Frédéric-Louis Sauser; 1 September 1887; La Chaux-de-Fonds, Neuchâtel, Switzerland
- Died: 21 January 1961 (aged 73); Paris, France
- Occupations: Novelist, poet
- Writing career
- Notable works: Sutter's Gold; Moravagine; Lice
- Movements: Modernism, Futurism

Frédéric-Louis Sauser (1 September 1887 – 21 January 1961), better known as Blaise Cendrars (French: [sɑ̃dʁaʁ]), was a Swiss-born novelist and poet who became a naturalized French citizen in 1916. He was a writer of considerable influence in the European modernist movement.

== Early years and education ==
He was born in La Chaux-de-Fonds, Neuchâtel, Switzerland, rue de la Paix 27, into a bourgeois francophone family, to a Swiss father and a Scottish mother. They sent young Frédéric to a German boarding school, but he ran away. At the Realschule in Basel in 1902 he met his lifelong friend the sculptor August Suter. Next they enrolled him in a school in Neuchâtel, but he had little enthusiasm for his studies. Finally, in 1904, he left school due to poor performance and began an apprenticeship with a Swiss watchmaker in Russia.

While living in St. Petersburg, he began to write, thanks to the encouragement of R.R., a librarian at the National Library of Russia. There he wrote the poem, "The Legend of Novgorode" (La Légende de Novgorode), which R.R. translated into Russian. Supposedly fourteen copies were made, but Cendrars claimed to have no copies of it, and none could be located during his lifetime. In 1995, the Bulgarian poet Kiril Kadiiski claimed to have found one of the Russian translations in Sofia, but the authenticity of the document remains contested on the grounds of factual, typographic, orthographic, and stylistic analysis.

In 1907, Sauser returned to Switzerland, where he studied medicine at the University of Berne. During this period, he wrote his first verified poems, Séquences, influenced by Remy de Gourmont's Le Latin mystique.

== Literary career ==
Cendrars was an early exponent of Modernism in European poetry with his works: The Legend of Novgorode (1907), Les Pâques à New York (1912), La prose du Transsibérien et de la Petite Jehanne de France (1913), Séquences (1913), La Guerre au Luxembourg (1916), Le Panama ou les Aventures de mes sept oncles (1918), J'ai tué (1918), and Dix-neuf poèmes élastiques (1919).

In many ways, he was a direct heir of Rimbaud, a visionary rather than what the French call un homme de lettres ("a man of letters"), a term that for him was predicated on a separation of intellect and life. Like Rimbaud, who writes in "The Alchemy of the Word" in A Season in Hell, "I liked absurd paintings over door panels, stage sets, backdrops for acrobats, signs, popular engravings, old-fashioned literature, church Latin, erotic books full of misspellings," Cendrars similarly says of himself in Der Sturm (1913), "I like legends, dialects, mistakes of language, detective novels, the flesh of girls, the sun, the Eiffel Tower."

Spontaneity, boundless curiosity, a craving for travel, and immersion in actualities were his hallmarks both in life and art. He was drawn to this same immersion in Balzac's flood of novels on 19th-century French society and in Casanova's travels and adventures through 18th-century Europe, which he set down in dozens of volumes of memoirs that Cendrars considered "the true Encyclopedia of the eighteenth century, filled with life as they are, unlike Diderot's, and the work of a single man, who was neither an ideologue nor a theoretician". Cendrars regarded the early modernist movement from roughly 1910 to the mid-1920s as a period of genuine discovery in the arts and in 1919 contrasted "theoretical cubism" with "the group's three antitheoreticians," Picasso, Braque, and Léger, whom he described as "three strongly personal painters who represent the three successive phases of cubism."

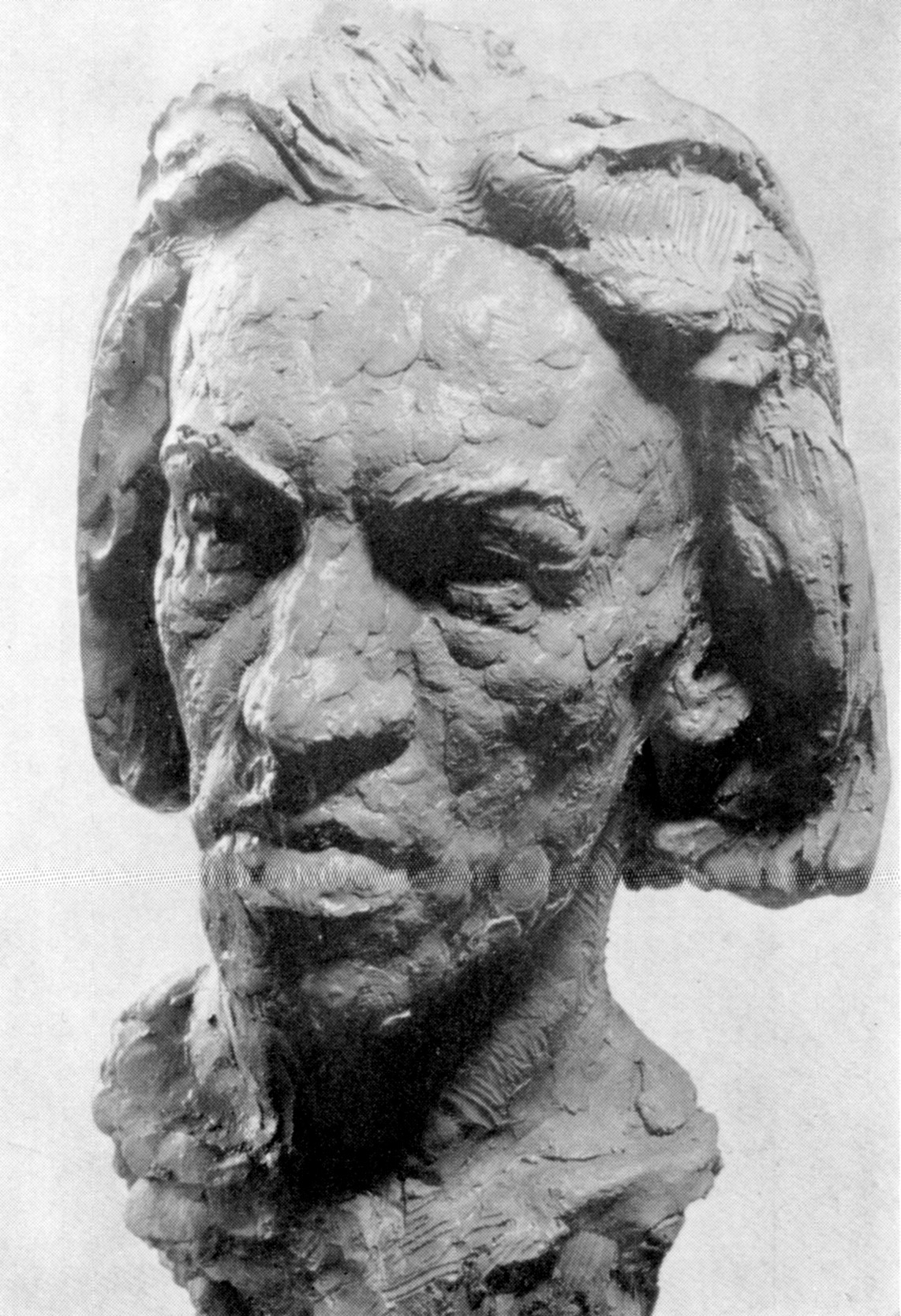
Portrait bust of Blaise Cendrars by August Suter (Paris 1911)

After a short stay in Paris, he traveled to New York, arriving on 11 December 1911. Between 6–8 April 1912, he wrote his long poem, Les Pâques à New York ("Easter in New York"), his first important contribution to modern literature. He signed it for the first time with the name Blaise Cendrars.

In the summer of 1912, Cendrars returned to Paris, convinced that poetry was his vocation. With Emil Szittya, an anarchist writer, he started the journal Les hommes nouveaux, also the name of the press where he published Les Pâques à New York and Séquences. He became acquainted with the international array of artists and writers in Paris, such as Chagall, Léger, Survage, Suter, Modigliani, Csaky, Archipenko, Jean Hugo and Robert Delaunay.

Most notably, he encountered Guillaume Apollinaire. The two poets influenced each other's work. Cendrars's poem Les Pâques à New York influenced Apollinaire's poem Zone. Cendrars's style was based on photographic impressions, cinematic effects of montage and rapid changes of imagery, and scenes of great emotional force, often with the power of a hallucination. These qualities, which also inform his prose, are already evident in Easter in New York and in his best known and even longer poem The Transsiberian, with its scenes of revolution and the Far East in flames in the Russo-Japanese war ("The earth stretches elongated and snaps back like an accordion / tortured by a sadic hand / In the rips in the sky insane locomotives / Take flight / In the gaps / Whirling wheels mouths voices / And the dogs of disaster howling at our heels"). The published work was printed within washes of color by the painter Sonia Delaunay-Terk as a fold-out two meters in length, together with her design of brilliant colors down the left-hand side, a small map of the Transsiberian railway in the upper right corner, and a painted silhouette in orange of the Eiffel Tower in the lower left. Cendrars called the work the first "simultaneous poem". Soon after, it was exhibited as a work of art in its own right and continues to be shown at exhibitions to this day.

This intertwining of poetry and painting was related to Robert Delaunay's and other artists' experiments in proto-expressionism. At the same time Gertrude Stein was beginning to write prose in the manner of Pablo Picasso's paintings. Cendrars liked to claim that his poem's first printing of one hundred fifty copies would, when unfolded, reach the height of the Eiffel Tower.

Cendrars's relationship with painters such as Chagall and Léger led him to write a series of revolutionary abstract short poems, published in a collection in 1919 under the title Dix-neuf poèmes élastiques ("Nineteen Elastic Poems"). Some were tributes to his fellow artists. In 1954, a collaboration between Cendrars and Léger resulted in Paris, ma ville ("Paris, My City"), in which the poet and illustrator together expressed their love of the French capital. As Léger died in 1955, the book was not published until 1987.

=== The Left-Handed Poet ===
His writing career was interrupted by World War I. When it began, he and the Italian writer Ricciotto Canudo appealed to other foreign artists to join the French army. He joined the French Foreign Legion. He was sent to the front line in the Somme where from mid-December 1914 until February 1915, he was in the line at Frise (La Grenouillère and Bois de la Vache). He described this war experience in the books La Main coupée (Lice/The Bloddy Hand, litt. "The severed hand") and J'ai tué ("I have killed"), and it is the subject of his poem "Orion" in Travel Notes: "It is my star / It is in the shape of a hand / It is my hand gone up to the sky ...". It was during the attacks in Champagne in September 1915 that Cendrars lost his right arm and was discharged from the army.

Jean Cocteau introduced him to Eugenia Errázuriz, who proved a supportive, if at times possessive, patron. Around 1918 he visited her house and was so taken with the simplicity of the décor that he was inspired to write the poems published as De Outremer à indigo (From ultramarine to indigo). He stayed with Eugenia in her house in Biarritz, in a room decorated with murals by Picasso. At this time, he drove an old Alfa Romeo which had been colour-coordinated by Georges Braque.

Cendrars became an important part of the artistic community in Montparnasse; his writings were considered a literary epic of the modern adventurer. He was a friend of the American writer Henry Miller, who called him his "great idol", a man he "really venerated as a writer". He knew many of the writers, painters, and sculptors living in Paris. In 1918, his friend Amedeo Modigliani painted his portrait. He was acquainted with Ernest Hemingway, who mentions having seen him "with his broken boxer's nose and his pinned-up empty sleeve, rolling a cigarette with his one good hand", at the Closerie des Lilas in Paris. He was also befriended by John Dos Passos, who was his closest American counterpart both as a world traveler (even more than Hemingway) and in his adaptation of Cendrars's cinematic uses of montage in writing, most notably in his great trilogy of the 1930s, U.S.A. One of the most gifted observers of the times, Dos Passos brought Cendrars to American readers in the 1920s and 30s by translating Cendrars's major long poems The Transsiberian and Panama and in his 1926 prose-poetic essay "Homer of the Transsiberian," which was reprinted from The Saturday Review one year later in Orient Express.

After the war, Cendrars became involved in the movie industry in Italy, France, and the United States. Cendrars's departure from poetry in the 1920s roughly coincided with his break from the world of the French intellectuals, summed up in his Farewell to Painters (1926) and the last section of L'homme foudroyé (1944), after which he began to make numerous trips to South America ("while others were going to Moscow", as he writes in that chapter). It was during this second half of his career that he began to concentrate on novels, short stories, and, near the end and just after World War II, on his magnificent poetic-autobiographical tetralogy, beginning with L'homme foudroyé.

=== Later years ===
Cendrars continued to be active in the Paris artistic community, encouraging younger artists and writing about them. For instance, he described the Hungarian photographer Ervin Marton as an "ace of white and black photography" in a preface to his exhibition catalogue. He was with the British Expeditionary Force in northern France at the beginning of the German invasion in 1940, and his book that immediately followed, Chez l'armée anglaise (With the English Army), was seized before publication by the Gestapo, which sought him out and sacked his library in his country home, while he fled into hiding in Aix-en-Provence. He comments on the trampling of his library and temporary "extinction of my personality" at the beginning of L'homme foudroyé (in the double sense of "the man who was blown away"). In Occupied France, the Gestapo listed Cendrars as a Jewish writer of "French expression", but he managed to survive. His youngest son was killed in an accident while escorting American planes in Morocco. Details of his time with the BEF and last meeting with his son appear in his work of 1949 Le Lotissement du ciel (translated simply as Sky).

In 1950, Cendrars settled down in the rue Jean-Dolent in Paris, across from the La Santé Prison. There he collaborated frequently with Radiodiffusion Française. He finally published again in 1956. The novel, Emmène-moi au bout du monde !…, was his last work before he suffered a stroke in 1957. He died in 1961. His ashes are held at Le Tremblay-sur-Mauldre.

=== Personal life ===
In New York in 1911, Cendrars married his first wife, Féla Poznańska, who was Jewish and of Russo-Polish extraction. They had three children: Rémy (an airman killed in WW2), Odilon and Miriam Gilou-Cendrars who was active with the Free French in London during World War II. She was her father's first biographer and helped set up the Cendrars Archive in Berne. Cendrars converted to Catholicism on May 1, 1959, and married Raymone Duchâteau, a French actress.

== Legacy and honors ==
- In 1960, André Malraux, the Minister of Culture, awarded him the title of Commander of the Légion d'honneur for his wartime service.
- 1961, Cendrars was awarded the Paris Grand Prix for literature.
- His literary estate is archived in the Swiss Literary Archives in Bern.
- The Centre d'Études Blaise Cendrars (CEBC) has been established at the University of Berne in his honor and for the study of his work.
- The French-language Association internationale Blaise Cendrars was established to study and preserve his works.
- The Lycée Blaise-Cendrars in La Chaux-de-Fonds and the Collège Blaise Cendrars in Boissy-Saint-Léger were named in his honor.
- In 2023 Cendrars was the subject of an exhibition, Blaise Cendrars (1887–1961): Poetry Is Everything, at the Morgan Library & Museum.

== Works ==
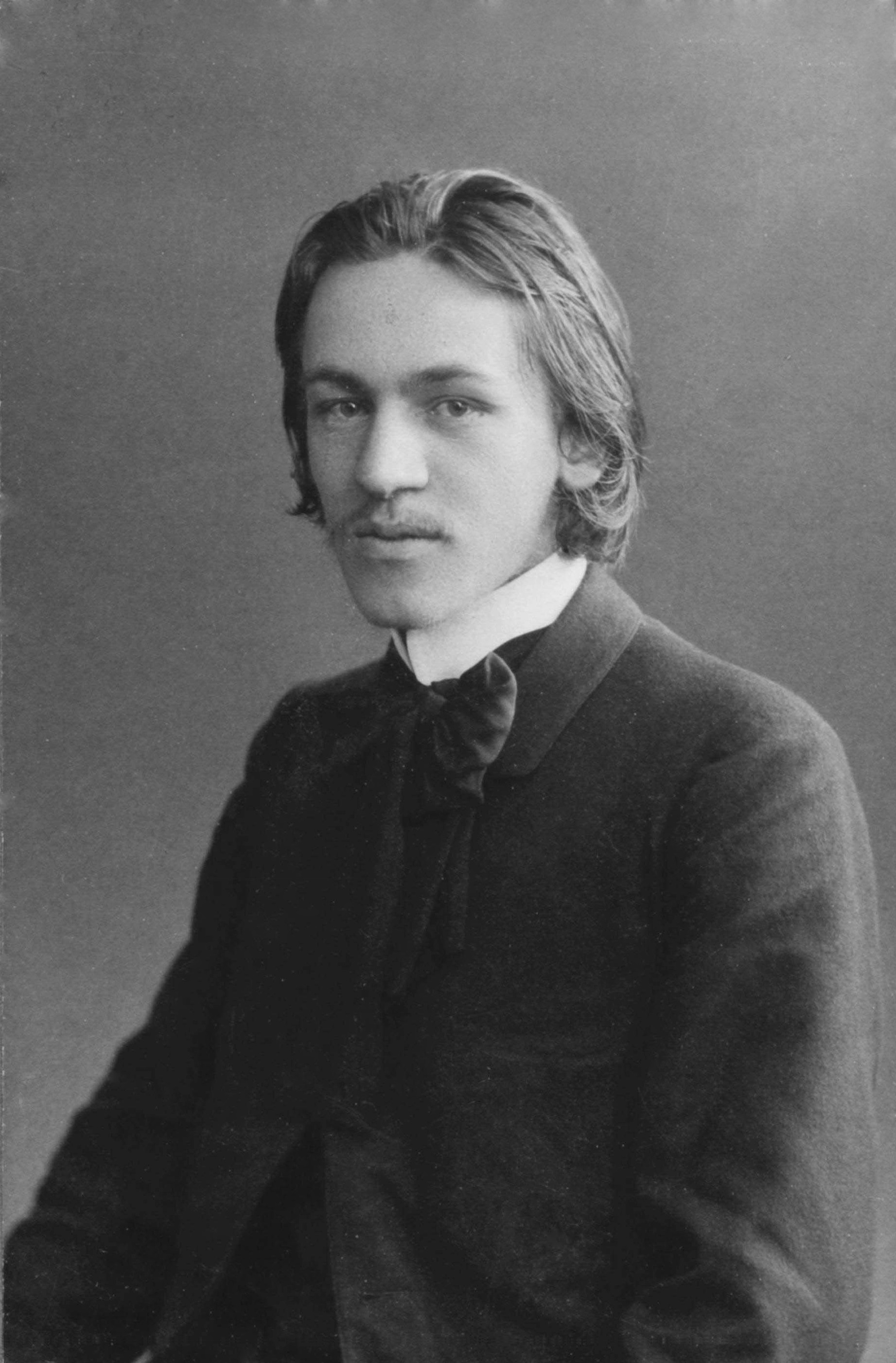
Blaise Cendrars, circa 1907.

Name of the work, year of first edition, publisher (in Paris if not otherwise noted) / kind of work / Known translations (year of first edition in that language)

- Les Pâques à New York (1912, Éditions des Hommes Nouveaux) / Poem / Spanish (1975)
- La prose du Transsibérien et de la Petite Jehanne de France (1913, Éditions des Hommes Nouveaux) / Poem / Spanish (1975); Bengali (1981, Bish Sataker Pharasi Kabita, Alliance Française de Calcutta; 1997)
- Selected Poems Blaise Cendrars (1979, Penguin Modern European Poets, /English tr. Pete Hoida)
- Séquences (1913, Éditions des Hommes Nouveaux)
- Rimsky-Korsakov et la nouvelle musique russe (1913)
- La Guerre au Luxembourg (1916, D. Niestlé, editor) / Poem / Spanish (1975)
- Profond aujourd'hui (1917, À la Belle Édition)
- Le Panama ou les Aventures de mes sept oncles (1918, Éditions de la Sirène) / Poem / English (1931); Spanish (1975); Bengali (2009)
- J'ai tué (1918, La Belle Édition) / Poetic essay / English (1992)
- Dix-neuf poèmes élastiques - (1919, Au Sans Pareil) / Poems / Spanish (1975)
- La Fin du monde filmée par l'Ange Notre-Dame - (1919, Éditions de la Sirène) / English (1992)
- Anthologie nègre - (1921, Éditions de la Sirène) / African Folk Tales / Spanish (1930); English (1972)
- Documentaires - (1924, with the title "Kodak", Librairie Stock) / Poems / Spanish (1975)
- Feuilles de route - (1924, Au Sans Pareil) / Spanish (1975)
- L'Or (1925, Grasset) / Novel / English (Sutter's Gold, 1926, Harper & Bros.) / Spanish (1931)
- Moravagine (1926, Grasset) / Novel / Spanish (1935); English (1968); Danish (2016, Basilisk)
- L'ABC du cinéma (1926, Les Écrivains Réunis) / English (1992)
- L'Eubage (1926, Au Sans Pareil) / English (1992)
- Éloge de la vie dangereuse (1926, Les Écrivains Réunis) / Poetic essay / English (1992); Spanish (1994)
- Le Plan de l'Aiguille (1927, Au Sans Pareil) / Novel / Spanish (1931); English (1987)
- Petits contes nègres pour les enfants des blancs (1928, Éditions de Portiques) / Portuguese (1989)
- Les Confessions de Dan Yack (1929, Au Sans Pareil) / Novel / Spanish (1930); English (1990)
- Une nuit dans la forêt (1929, Lausanne, Éditions du Verseau) / Autobiographical essay
- Comment les Blancs sont d'anciens Noirs - (1929, Au Sans Pareil)
- Rhum : L'Aventure de Jean Galmot (1930, Grasset) / Novel / Spanish (1937)
- Aujourd'hui (1931, Grasset)
- Vol à voile (1932, Lausanne, Librairie Payot)
- Panorama de la pègre (1935, Grenoble, Arthaud) / Journalism
- Hollywood, La Mecque du cinéma (1936, Grasset) / Journalism
- Histoires vraies (1937, Grasset) / Stories / Spanish (1938)
- La Vie dangereuse (1938, Grasset) / Stories
- D'Oultremer à Indigo (1940, Grasset)
- Chez l'armée Anglaise (1940, Corrêa) / Journalism
- Poésie complète (1944, Denoël), Complete poetic works / English (Complete Poems, tr. by Ron Padgett, Univ. of California Press, 1992)
- L'Homme foudroyé (1945, Denoël) / Novel / English (1970); Spanish (1983)
- La Main coupée (1946, Denoël) / Novel / (in French) / English (Lice, 1973 / The Bloody Hand, 2014 ), Spanish (1980)
- Bourlinguer (1948, Denoël) / Novel / English (1972); Spanish (2004)
- Le Lotissement du ciel (1949, Denoël) / Novel / English (1992)
- La Banlieue de Paris (1949, Lausanne, La Guilde du Livre) / Essay with photos by Robert Doisneau
- Blaise Cendrars, vous parle... (1952, Denoël) / Interviews by Michel Manoll
- Le Brésil, des Hommes sont venus (1952, Monaco, Les Documents d'Art)
- Noël aux 4 coins du monde (1953, Robert Cayla) / Stories emitted by radio in 1951 / English (1994)
- Emmène-moi au bout du monde!... (1956, Denoël) / Novel / Spanish (1982), English (To the End of the World, 1966, tr. by Alan Brown, Grove Press)
- Du monde entier au cœur du monde (1957, Denoël) /
- Trop c'est trop (1957, Denoël)
- Films sans images (1959, Denoël)
- Amours (1961)
- Dites-nous Monsieur Blaise Cendrars (1969)
- Paris ma ville. Illustrations de Fernand Léger. (1987, Bibliothèque des Arts)
- Petits contes nègres pour les enfants des blancs (1921, Editions Denoël)

== See also ==
- Le Monde's 100 Books of the Century, a list which includes Moravagine
- Swiss literature
