= Gotthard Jedlicka =

Swiss art historian and writer

Gotthard Jedlicka (6 May 1899 – 9 November 1965) was a Swiss art historian and writer.

== Biography ==
Jedlicka was born on 6 May 1899 in Zürich. He studied art history in Zürich, Grenoble and Paris and became a teacher in a secondary school in Winterthur.

He earned a doctorate in 1928 and was promoted to professor in 1934. From 1939 to 1965 he was professor of art history at the University of Zurich. Besides, he was an editor of the magazine Galerie und Sammler and of the art book series of Scherz-Verlag. He was also an editor of the Swiss monthly magazine Werk. Moreover, he wrote several art books and monographies about artists such as Toulouse-Lautrec, Édouard Manet and Pieter Brueghel the Elder. His work is preserved by the Zentralbibliothek Zürich.

In 1951, Jedlicka became a member of the German Academy for Language and Literature.

He died on 9 November 1965 in Duisburg. He was buried at Enzenbühl Cemetery.

== Works (selection) ==
- Henri de Toulouse-Lautrec. Laupen, 1929 (dissertation, University of Zurich, Department of Philosophy I, 1929, 28 pages)
- Henri Matisse. Chronique du jour, Paris, 1930, (200 issues)
- Begegnungen. Künstlernovellen. Schwabe, Basel, 1933
- Pieter Bruegel. Der Maler in seiner Zeit. Rentsch, Erlenbach, 1938
- Edouard Manet. Rentsch, Erlenbach, 1941
- Spanische Malerei. Atlantis Verlag, 1941
- Zur schweizerischen Malerei der Gegenwart. Rentsch, Erlenbach, 1947
- Pierre Bonnard. Ein Besuch. Rentsch, Erlenbach, 1949
- Pariser Tagebuch. Suhrkamp (Bibliothek Suhrkamp 18), Frankfurt am Main, 1953
- Anblick und Erlebnis. Bildbetrachtungen. Suhrkamp (Bibliothek Suhrkamp 29), Frankfurt am Main 1955
- Die Matisse Kapelle in Vence. Rosenkranzkapelle der Dominikanerinnen. Suhrkamp, Frankfurt am Main, 1955
- Wege zum Kunstwerk. Begegnungen mit Kunst und Künstlern. Piper, Munich, 1960
- Der Fauvismus. Büchergilde Gutenberg, Zürich, 1961
- Max Gubler. Hrsg. von Friedel Jedlicka. Huber, Frauenfeld, 1970
- Mit Henri Matisse in Paris 1931. Piet Meyer (Kleine Bibliothek 5), Basel 2008, ISBN 978-3-905799-04-0

== Bibliography ==
- Hüttinger, Eduard; Lüthy, Hans A., eds. (1974). Gotthard Jedlicka. Eine Gedenkschrift (in German). Zürich: Orell Füssli. ISBN 3-280-00686-4.
- "Gotthard Jedlicka", Dictionary of Art Historians
- Hans A. Lüthy (1974). "Jedlicka, Gotthard". Neue Deutsche Biographie (in German). Vol. 10. Berlin: Duncker & Humblot. pp. 383–384. (full text online).
- Juerg Albrecht: "Gotthard Jedlicka" in German, French and Italian in the online Historical Dictionary of Switzerland.
