= Robert Perrier =

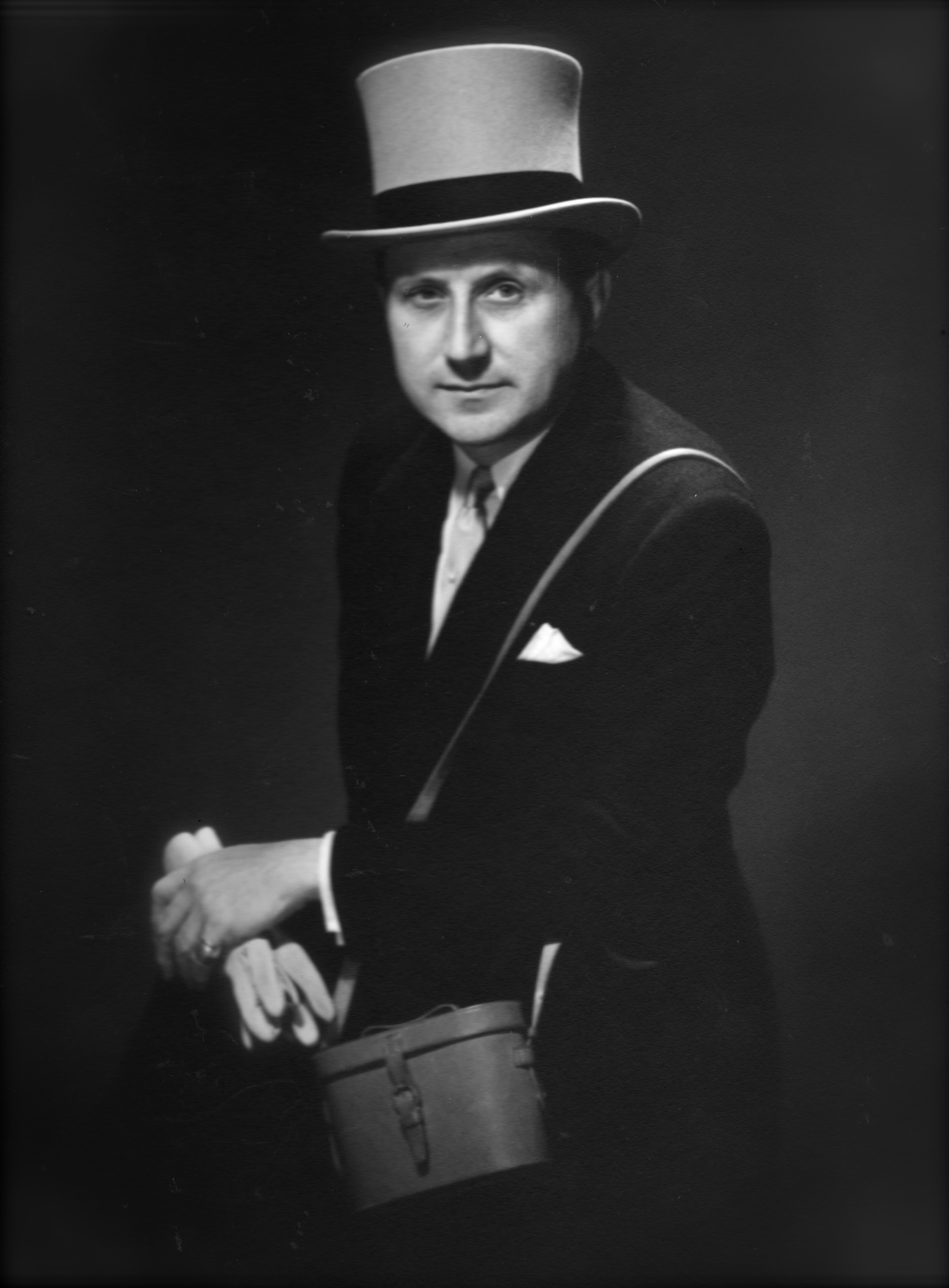
- Born: Robert Charles Perrier; July 1, 1898; Paris, France
- Died: April 19, 1987 (aged 88); Paris, France
- Education: HEC Paris
- Occupations: Haute couture textile supplier, Songwriter, Art collector
- Years active: 1914–1970
- Children: Marie-Jacques Perrier

Robert Charles Perrier (July 1, 1898 to April 19, 1987) was a French haute couture textile supplier, songwriter, socialite and art collector. His vintage silks rank among the world’s most coveted luxury fabrics, including exclusivities created for Coco Chanel, Christian Dior and Yves Saint Laurent, now exhibited at the Metropolitan Museum of Art, the Musée de la Mode et du Textile and the Victoria and Albert Museum. Perrier is further credited in history for having introduced synthetic fabrics to French haute couture, a major novelty at the time.

Perrier's family’s private artistic salon in Montmartre, dubbed R-26, was a bohemian gathering place for many creative luminaries of the 1930s to 1960s, including singer Josephine Baker, architect Le Corbusier and musician Django Reinhardt. He was the husband of lyricist Madeleine (Brault) Perrier and the father of journalist Marie-Jacques Perrier.

== See also ==
- Metropolitan Museum of Art
- Montmartre
- Musée de la Mode et du Textile
- Musée de Montmartre
- Musée Galliera
- Marie-Jacques Perrier
- R-26 (salon)
- Victoria and Albert Museum
