= R-26 (salon) =

Coordinates: 48.8877°N 2.3379°E

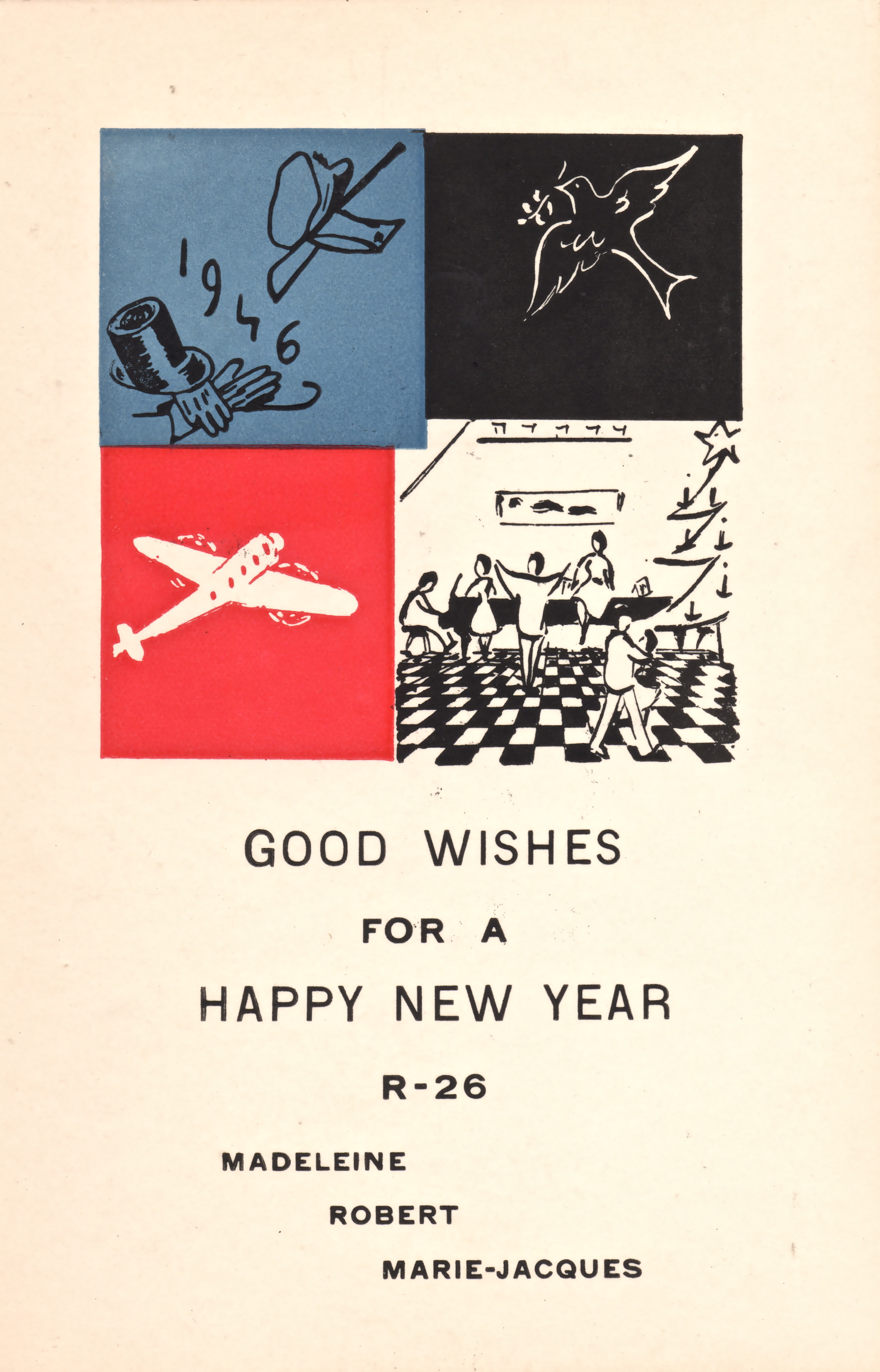
R-26 New Year card (1946)

R-26 (alt. English: R-Two-Six or French: R-vingt-six) was an artistic salon regularly held at the private residence of socialites Madeleine, Marie-Jacques and Robert Perrier at 26 Rue Norvins in the Montmartre district of Paris. First convened on 1 January 1930, the salon became a meeting ground for many creative luminaries of the next eighty years, including singer Josephine Baker, architect Le Corbusier and musician Django Reinhardt.

== Origins ==
In 1929, haute couture textile supplier Robert Perrier was residing with his wife, Madeleine, and daughter, Marie-Jacques, in a spacious loft apartment overlooking the Moulin de la Galette in the Montmartre district of Paris. The address, located at 26 Rue Norvins, was popular among artists, shared with Marcel Aymé and Désiré-Émile Inghelbrecht, and counting Louis-Ferdinand Céline, Gen Paul and Tristan Tzara among the immediate neighbors.

Madeleine and Robert Perrier, by virtue of their diverse connections in haute couture, were both respected socialites. Large social gatherings at their home occurred regularly, bringing together eminent artists and designers who would share and discuss their latest works. Early on, painter Sonia Delaunay, a close colleague of Robert Perrier, was most active in introducing new artists to the gatherings, aided by her husband, Robert, and son, Charles. The Perrier family's informal soirées, increasingly influential as time progressed, were at last formally baptized in the first hours of the year 1930, when New Year's Eve guests officially founded the artistic salon of R-26 ('R' for Robert Perrier and '26' for 26 Rue Norvins). Among these founding members was painter Georges Vantongerloo, who that night designed the salon's iconic Cubist shield.

== Prior to World War II ==
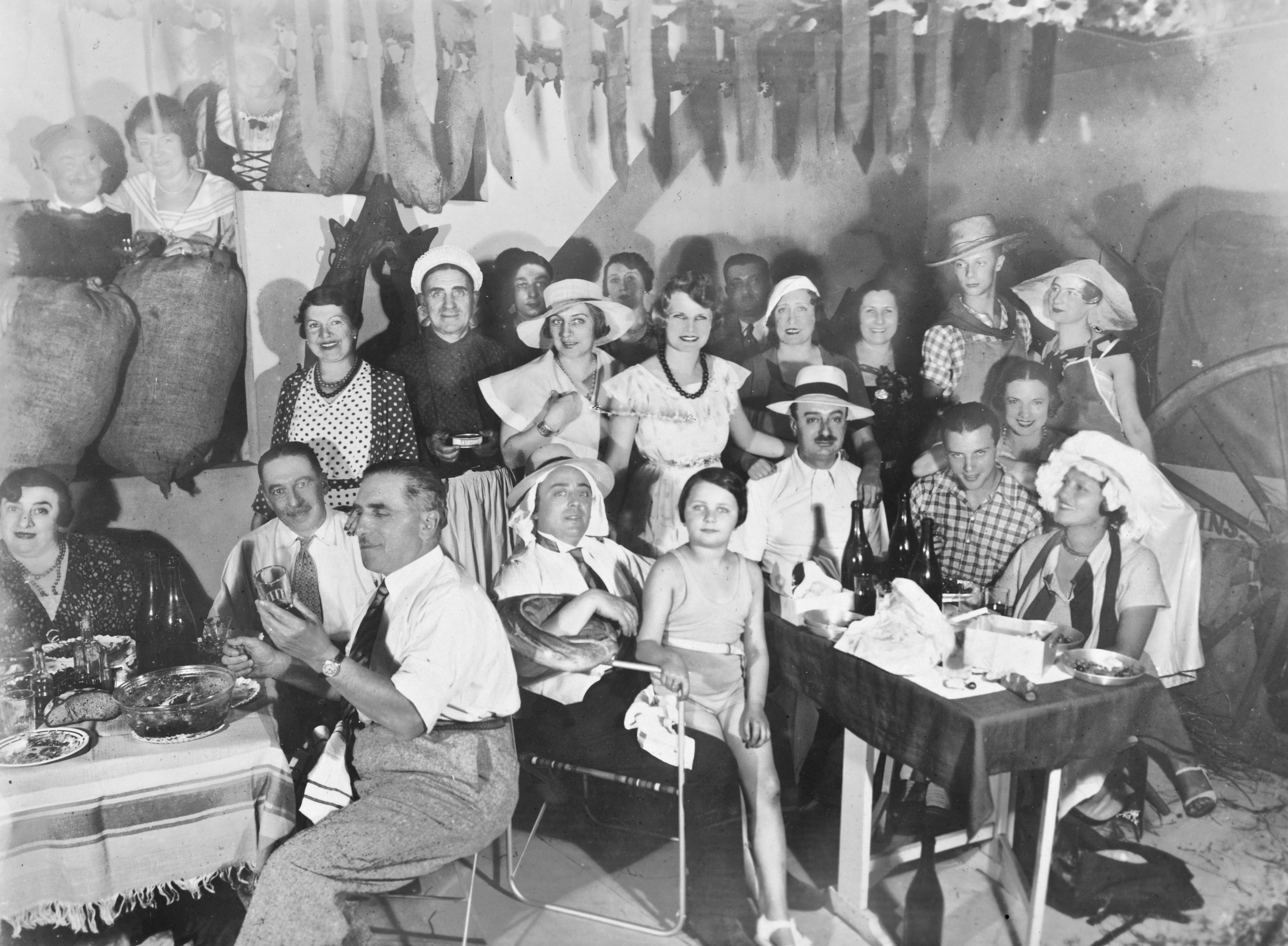
Soirée at R-26 in front of staircase by Le Corbusier (1933)

After 1930, R-26's membership steadily grew. Architect Le Corbusier was presented to the salon by his brother, musician Albert Jeanneret (with whom the young Marie-Jacques Perrier began her musical career). Le Corbusier soon set to work modernizing the interior of R-26, designing the salon's Cubist staircase. During this time, Robert Perrier began to hone his talents as a songwriter, publishing with Les Publications Francis Day and acquiring a second grand piano to add to the festivities at R-26.

The year 1935 saw the arrival at R-26 of numerous musicians who would prove quintessential to the salon's development. Pierre Dudan, having arrived on foot from Lausanne, immediately took up residence with the Perrier family. His song "Clopin-clopant", originally composed for a soirée at R-26 and dedicated to the Perrier family, soon proved a staple of the salon's repertory. Following Dudan came Jean Tranchant and Michel Warlop, the latter of whom introduced to R-26 the violinist Stéphane Grappelli, soon one of the salon's most dedicated members.

In his memoir My Violin As My Only Baggage, Grappelli wrote:

Then there was Robert and Madeleine Perrier…These naturalized Montmartrois residing on the Rue Norvins entertained many: writers, musicians, painters and poets alike gathered at their home. They invited me often; the soirées were brilliant…It was there that I met all of Montmartre.

By 1937, Grappelli was regularly holding rehearsals at R-26 with guitarist Django Reinhardt, another devoted contributor to the salon. Early on, Reinhardt was impressed by the budding musical talents of Marie-Jacques Perrier, with whom he decided to record several staples of the R-26 repertory, including "Les salades de l'oncle François" (written by Tranchant) and "Ric et Pussy" (written by Robert and Madeleine Perrier).

Speaking of Reinhardt at R-26, Tranchant wrote in his memoir The Big Wheel:

Between Django and me there was but one common denominator: music, that which was found, far from the theater's preoccupations, at the fabled salon of Madeleine and Robert Perrier, an ideal refuge at which to kick up one's heels.

== After World War II ==
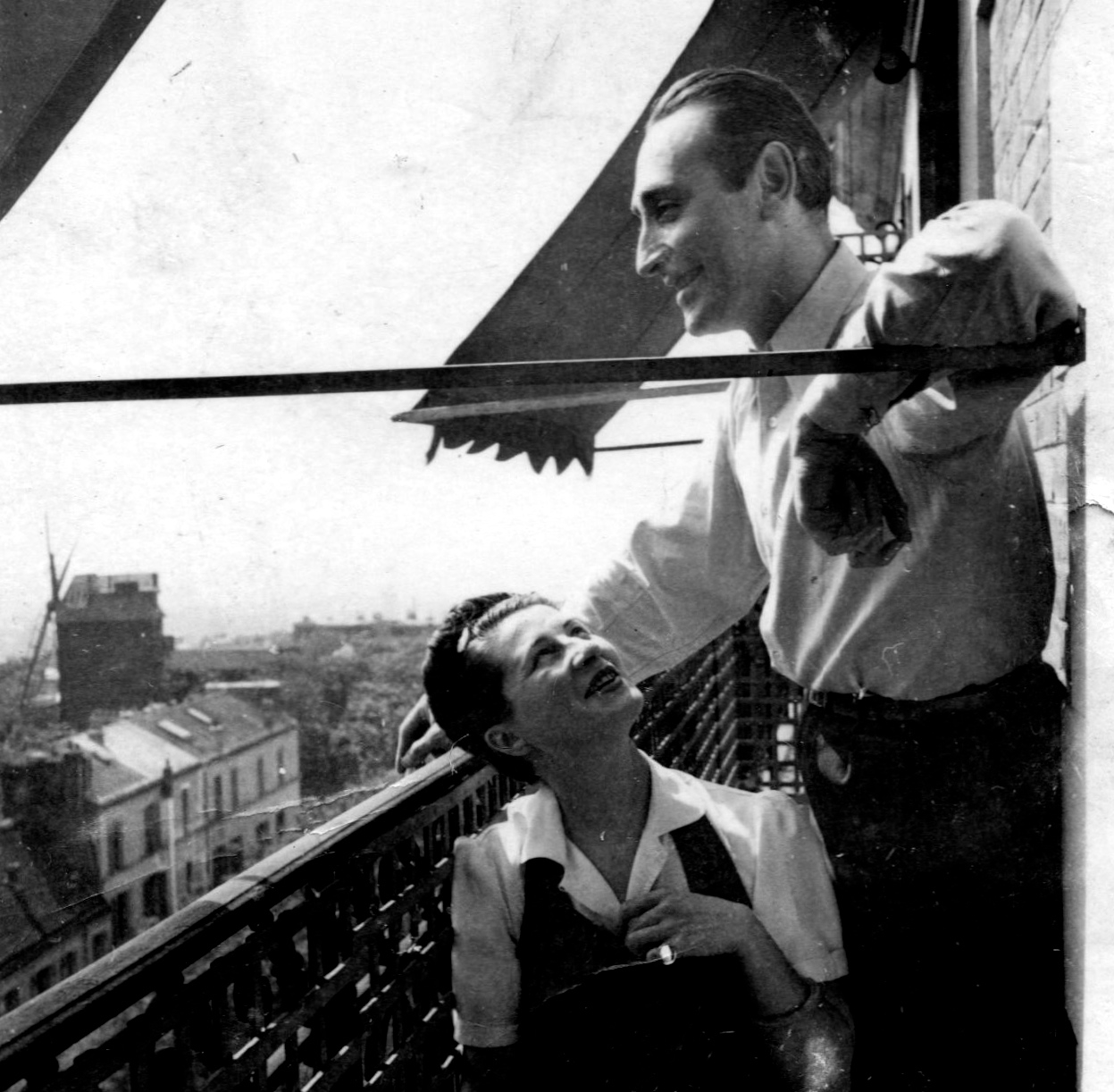
Madeleine Perrier and Jean Tranchant at R-26 (1946)

Though World War II and the Nazi occupation of Paris closed a chapter in the history of R-26, the Liberation of Paris opened another. Over two years, Madeleine and Robert Perrier entertained some one hundred and sixty-six American officers at R-26.

Jean Tranchant, upon his return to France, took up permanent residence at R-26, while Stéphane Grappelli found lodgings at the home of Robert Perrier's mother. The artistic salon resumed activity as before, introducing to R-26 singer Josephine Baker, a mutual friend of Le Corbusier and Tranchant.

Django Reinhardt and Stéphane Grappelli continued to favor R-26 as an informal rehearsal space for the Quintette du Hot Club de France, often improvising with other members of the salon. In 1947, in honor of ten years spent at R-26 as guests of the Perrier family, Reinhardt and Grappelli composed the song "R. vingt-six", to be used as an anthem among the salon's members.

Throughout the next decade, many new artists presented their talents at R-26, from Henri Salvador to Yves Klein to Mary Lou Williams, a pianist for whom Robert Perrier wrote the celebrated melody "I Made You Love Paris".

During the 1950s, Robert Perrier begin making audio recordings of numerous soirées held at R-26, tapes that offer precious insight into the creative process of several of the salon's most famous guests. A selection of these recordings were later released publicly, including Marie-Jacques Perrier's cover version of "La pluie sur le toit" (written by Robert and Madeleine Perrier), accompanied by Stéphane Grappelli.

Following the death of Robert Perrier in 1987, Marie-Jacques Perrier decided to modernize her family's artistic salon by offering long-term residence at R-26 to foreign students studying in Paris. Over the next twenty-five years, Perrier shared her apartment with over a hundred young artists and freethinkers of diverse nationalities. Under Perrier's direction, soirées at R-26 increased in both frequency and scope, attracting members of the French leadership including former Prime Minister Alain Juppé.

== Legacy ==
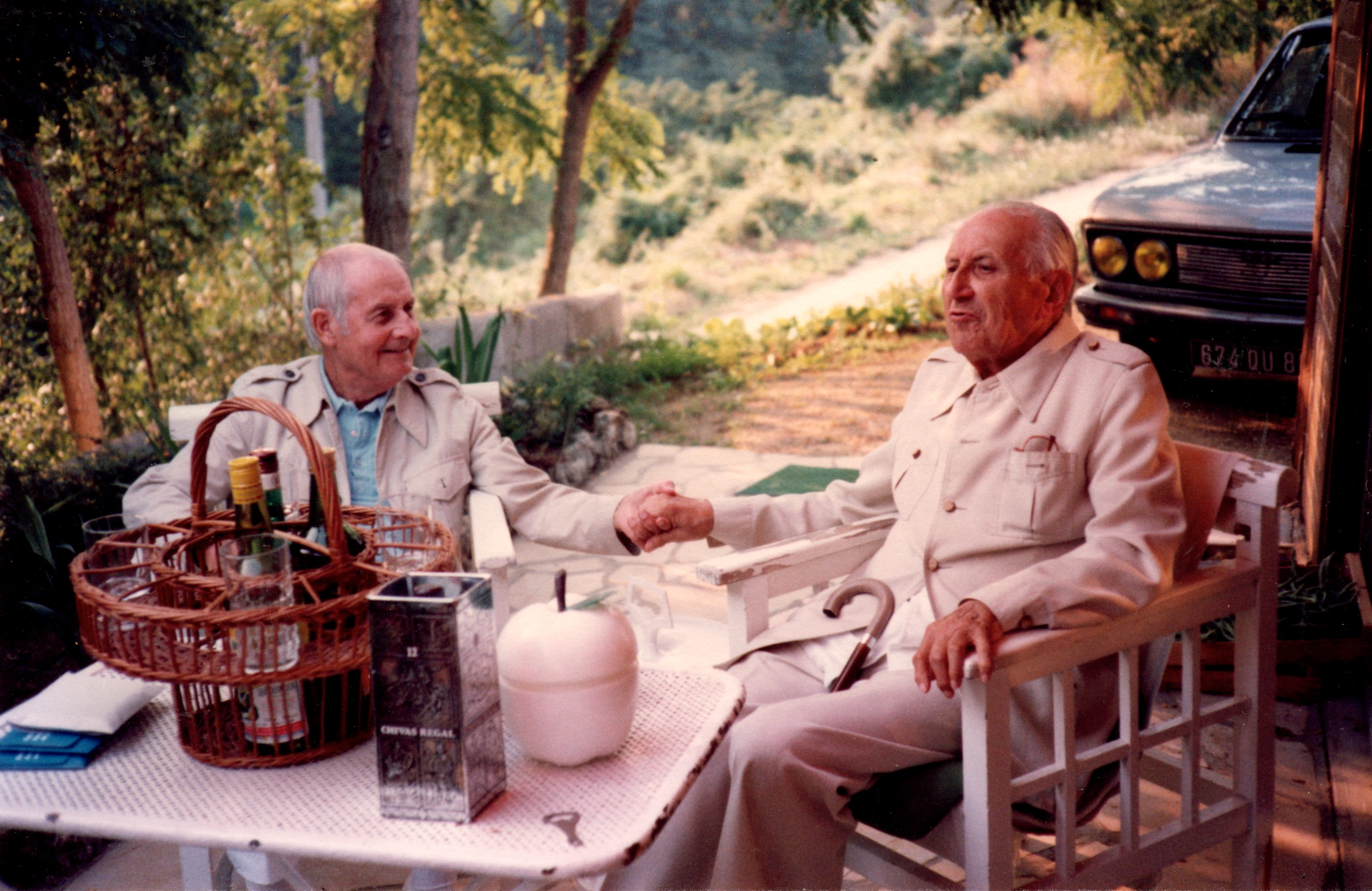
Stéphane Grappelli and Robert Perrier (1985)

R-26 remains present in the popular imagination as an exclusive meeting place of many avant-garde artists of the 1930s to 1960s. The address's exterior (now 2 Place Marcel-Aymé), located next to Jean Marais's statue of Le Passe-muraille, attracts many tourists visiting Montmartre, particularly those interested in the legacy of Django Reinhardt. The salon has been the subject of several television documentaries for France 4, History and ITV, and has inspired various museum exhibitions as well as numerous musical anthologies.

Pierre Dudan's song "Clopin-clopant", an old staple of the R-26 repertory, found initial fame when orchestrated by Bruno Coquatrix and recorded by several of the salon's members, including Josephine Baker, Stéphane Grappelli, Django Reinhardt and Henri Salvador. An English-language version, ironically re-titled "Comme ci, comme ça", became internationally famous when recorded by Maurice Chevalier, inspiring further cover versions by Paul Anka, Frank Sinatra and Barbra Streisand.

The tribute song "R. vingt-six", written by Reinhardt and Grappelli, has since been covered by numerous musicians paying homage to the R-26 salon, including Tim Kliphuis, Fapy Lafertin, Paulus Schäfer and the Rosenberg Trio.

== See also ==
"R. vingt-six" by Django Reinhardt and Stéphane Grappelli - Sheet music with dedication to Madeleine and Robert Perrier (1947)

- Chanson
- Cité de la Musique
- Cubism
- Josephine Baker
- Salon (gathering)
- Pierre-Jules Ginet
- Stéphane Grappelli
- Gypsy jazz
- Le Corbusier
- Marie-Jacques Perrier
- Robert Perrier
- Montmartre
- Musée de Montmartre
- Django Reinhardt
- Gertrude Stein
