= Marie-Jacques Perrier =

French singer, fashion journalist, voice actress, socialite, author and art collector

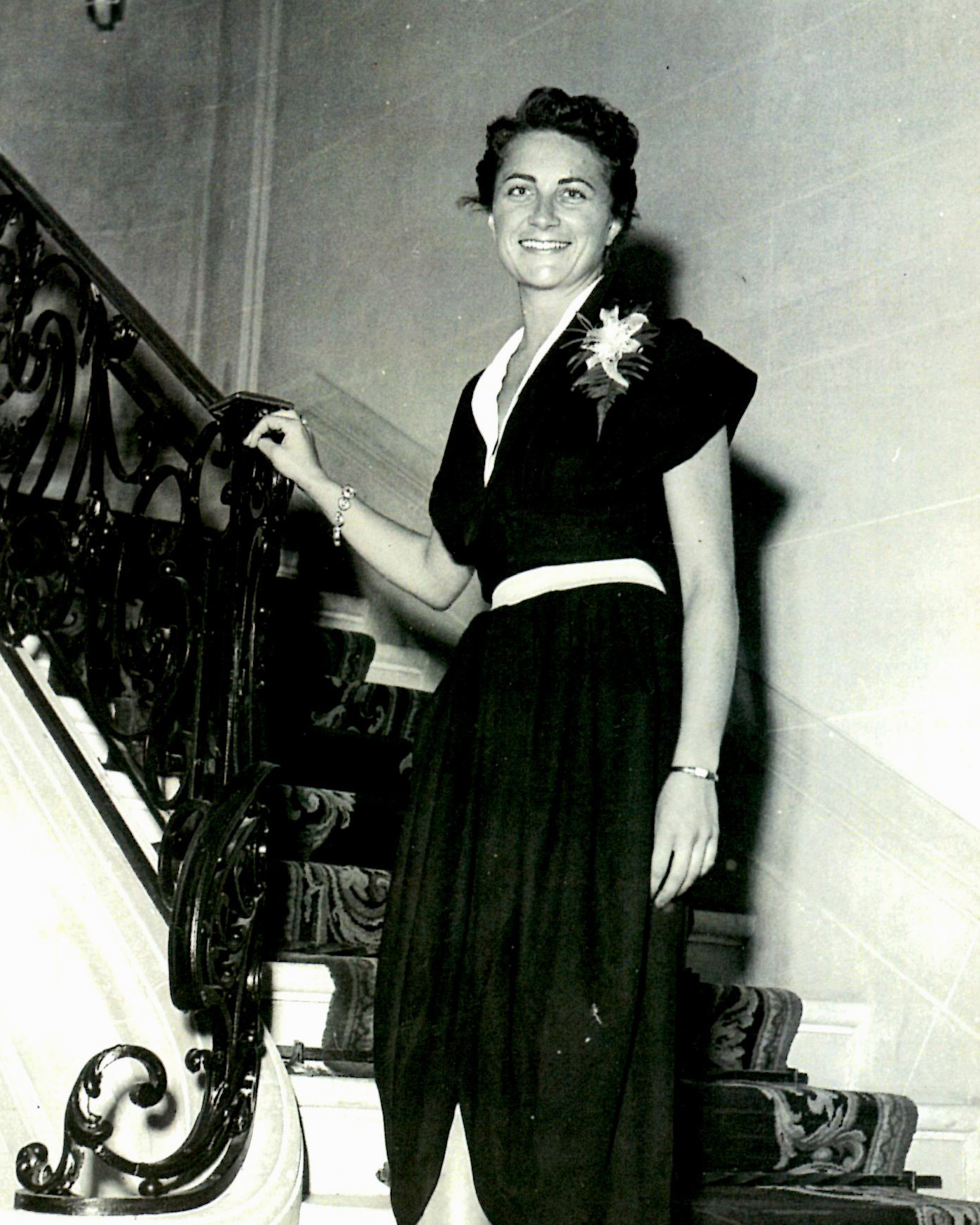
- Born: Marie-Jacques Renée Perrier; 22 November 1924; Paris, France
- Died: 29 November 2012 (aged 88); Paris, France
- Education: École du Louvre
- Occupations: Singer, Fashion journalist, Voice actress, Author, Art collector
- Years active: 1934–2012
- Children: 1 daughter

Marie-Jacques Renée "Jacotte" Perrier (22 November 1924 – 29 November 2012) was a French singer, fashion journalist, voice actress, socialite, author and art collector. She was best known for her musical collaborations with the Quintette du Hot Club de France and her fashion reporting for Fairchild Publications. She was the daughter of musical composer and haute couture textile supplier Robert Perrier, from whom she inherited direction of the R-26 artistic salon.

== Early life and singing career ==
Born in the Montmartre district of Paris in 1924, Marie-Jacques Perrier was raised among the regulars of her parents’ R-26, the informal artistic salon based in the family's apartment and frequented by artists such as Josephine Baker, Stéphane Grappelli, Django Reinhardt, Henri Salvador, Jean Tranchant and Mary Lou Williams. Perrier began her acting career at the age of ten using the stage name Jacotte Perrier, performing in variety theaters and on French radio. Her voice soon became synonymous with the role of Mitou in the popular radio comedy Serpentin, Mitou et Toti, under the direction of Alain Saint-Ogan. As a singer, she began her recording career with Pathé Records in 1937, producing singles with Reinhardt and his Quintette du Hot Club de France including the series Chansons de Jacotte, written by Jean Tranchant, and ‘Ric et Pussy’, written by Perrier's parents.

Perrier was equally introduced into the milieu of her father's haute couture business, affording her a visit in 1944 with the then-destitute and moribund Paul Poiret.

After graduating from the École du Louvre in 1944, Perrier was variously employed by couturière Marie-Louise Bruyère, film producer Fred Orain, the Embassy of Pakistan in France and Panair do Brasil (Pan American Airways).

Perrier's musical collaborations with Stéphane Grappelli continued until 1950, recording music written by Perrier's parents such as the single ‘La pluie sur le toit’.

== Fashion journalism career ==
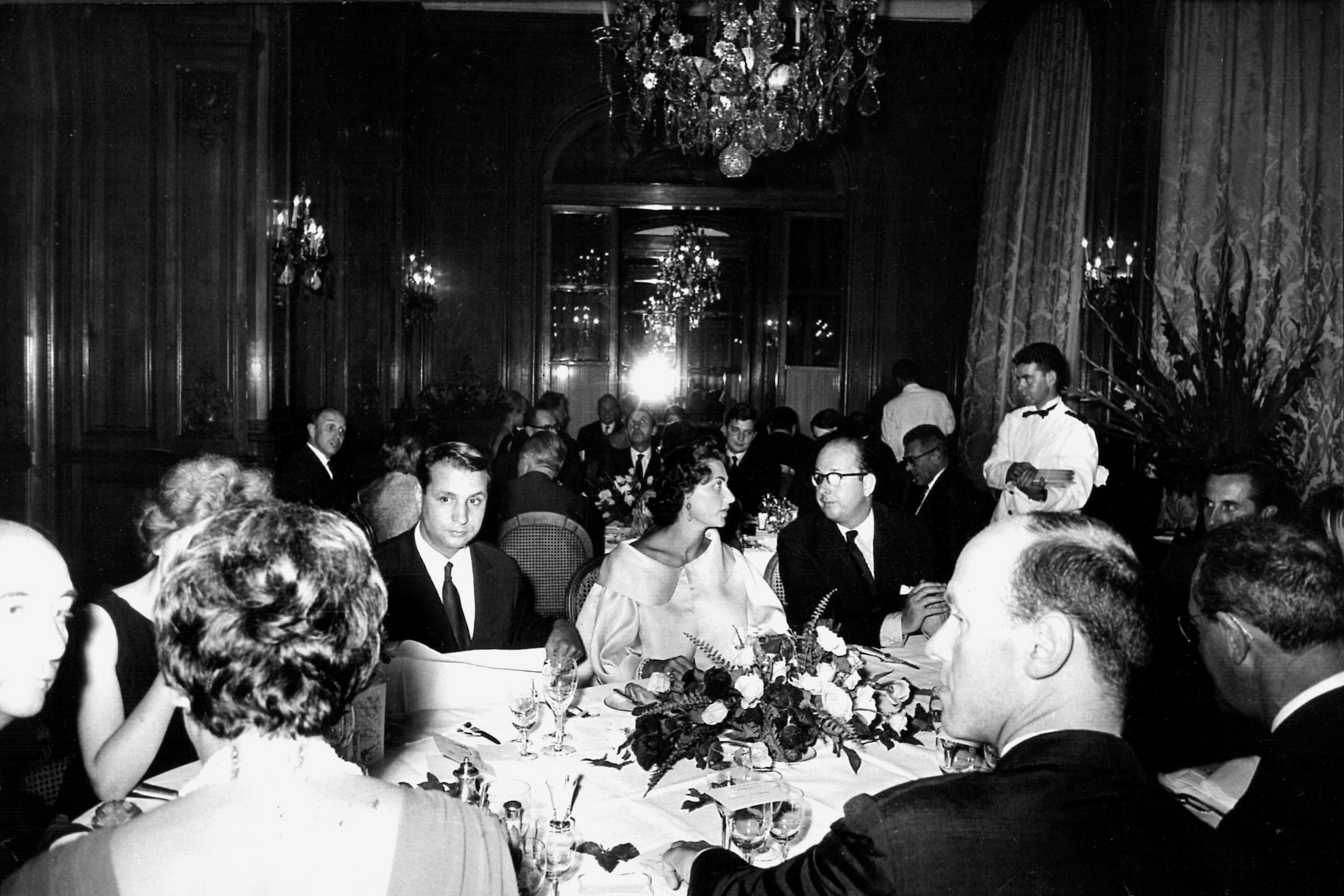
Perrier (center) at a dinner for Charles Jourdan. Plaza Athénée 1962.

Leveraging her father's contacts within the fashion industry, Marie-Jacques Perrier became employed in 1955 as an English-language journalist for the Paris office of Fairchild Publications, partnering her with the budding illustrator Kenneth Paul Block. Her contributions from Paris, London and New York City to the company's Women's Wear Daily and the Daily News Record soon became extremely popular, earning Perrier's reputation as one of Fairchild's most distinguished journalists of haute couture. Perrier earned wide acclaim for her interviews with many of the decade's most fashionable women, including Jacqueline Kennedy, Estée Lauder, Princess Margaret and Farah Diba Pahlavi. An interview with Maria Callas first quoted the singer's famous assertion, "Paris dicte la mode au monde entier" ("Paris dictates fashion to the whole world").

Through the course of her seven years with Fairchild Publications, Perrier interviewed most of the major Paris-based fashion designers, including Pierre Balmain, Hubert de Givenchy, Nina Ricci and Elsa Schiaparelli. She was also one of the first to feature interviews with many future luminaries, among them James Galanos, Karl Lagerfeld, Yves Saint Laurent and Emanuel Ungaro. Perrier was a member of the Fashion Group Paris alongside colleagues Eugenia Sheppard and Diana Vreeland. Throughout Perrier's career, she maintained a close professional relationship with designers such as Pierre Cardin, André Courrèges and Givenchy, contacts that were much in demand by Perrier's publishers.

In 1962, Fairchild Publications underwent a major restructuring resulting in the departure of most of the Paris office's journalists, Perrier included. Perrier then moved to Los Angeles to work as a foreign correspondent and freelance for The Hollywood Reporter, though the birth of her daughter encouraged Perrier to return to Europe. Later writing for a variety of publications in Paris, London, Milan, Sydney and Buenos Aires, she continued to report on haute couture shows, interviewing a new generation of then up-and-coming designers including Calvin Klein, Thierry Mugler, Oscar de la Renta and Kenzo Takada.

Perrier's career as a fashion journalist was remarkable in that it spanned essentially three distinct eras of haute couture, from that of Schiaparelli to Saint Laurent to Mugler. She contributed reporting to a total of eighty-seven publications worldwide, in addition to co-authoring numerous books on the subject of fashion.

== Later life ==
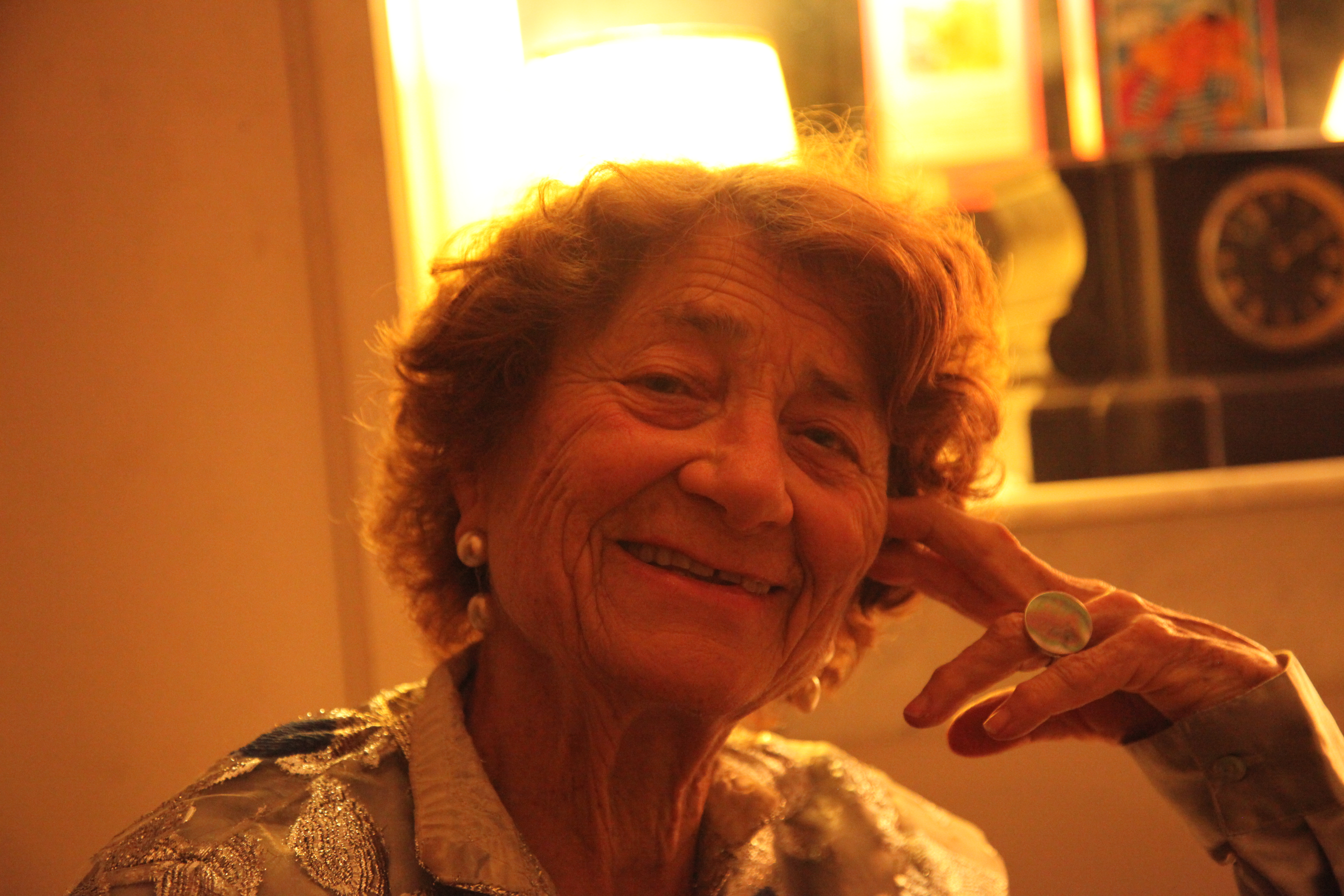
Perrier at her home in Montmartre, 2011

Well into her eighties, Marie-Jacques Perrier continued work as a reporter while managing the archives of both her parents’ music and her father's Société de Textiles Robert Perrier.

Perrier was the inheritor of her father's art collection, including numerous paintings by Sonia Delaunay. To this she added works of abstractionism, surrealism and minimalism, such as some by Yves Klein. The collection was eventually dispersed by auction and donation.

Perrier was the subject of several television documentaries for History and ITV. She was regularly a guest of honor at retrospectives and festivals celebrating Django Reinhardt, as she was one of the guitarist's longest living collaborators.

In 2004, Perrier renewed her singing career to record an anthology of her parents’ music, Echos du R. 26.

Following her father's death, Perrier decided to modernize the R-26 artistic salon by offering long-term residence at her family's apartment to foreign students studying in Paris. Over the next twenty-five years, Perrier shared her home with over a hundred young artists and freethinkers of diverse nationalities. She also organized student dialogues with members of the French leadership, among them former Prime Minister Alain Juppé.

On 29 November 2012, in Paris's 18th arrondissement, Marie-Jacques Perrier died suddenly at the age of eighty-eight of a pulmonary embolism. A commemorative mass was held in her honor several weeks later at the church of Saint-Pierre de Montmartre.

== Partial discography ==
- Chansons de Jacotte - 1935
- La Ferme enchantée - 1937
- Gros émoi parmi les souris - 1937
- Close to You - 1938
- Noël des Enfants qui n'ont plus de maison - 1938
- Par un fil - 1938
- Vingt Ans - 1938
- Ric et Pussy - 1938
- Les salades de l'oncle François - 1938
- La pluie sur le toit - 1950
- Tu m’as dit – 1983
- Les cinglés du Music Hall – 1995
- Intégrale Django Reinhardt - 1999
- Echos du R. 26 - 2004
- Chansons d’enfance - 2007
- Soirées à Montmartre – 2007
- Django et la chanson - 2008

== See also ==
- 1950s in fashion
- 1960s in fashion
- 1970s in fashion
- Continental jazz
- Django Reinhardt
- Eugenia Sheppard
- Fairchild Fashion Group
- Montmartre
- Musée de la Mode et du Textile
- Musée de Montmartre
- Musée Galliera
- R-26 (salon)
- Robert Perrier
- Women's Wear Daily
