= Wall of Love =

Wall of Love (Mur des Je t'aime)
- The Wall of Love in 2010
- Interactive map of Wall of Love (Mur des Je t'aime)
- 48°53′04.65″N 2°20′18.35″E
- Location: Square Jehan Rictus, Place des Abbesses, 75018 Paris, France

The Wall of Love (French: Le mur des je t'aime, lit. the I Love You Wall) is a love-themed wall of 40 square metres (430 sq ft) in the Jehan Rictus garden square in Montmartre, Paris, France. The wall was created in 2000 by artists Frédéric Baron and Claire Kito and is composed of 612 tiles of enamelled lava, on which the phrase 'I love you' is featured 311 times in 250 languages. Each tile is 21 by 29.7 centimetres (8.3 in × 11.7 in).

The wall includes the words 'I love you' in all major languages, but also in rarer ones like Navajo, Inuit, Bambara and Esperanto. The wall is open to the public free of charge.

== Origins ==
Frédéric Baron first asked his brother, and later his foreign neighbours, to write words of love in their languages, then collected 'I love you' in this way in over 300 languages and dialects of the world.

Claire Kito, a calligrapher, then assembled them in a work to be realised on enamel plates.

== Symbolism ==
The symbolism of the wall was a personal choice of the artist. A wall is a symbol of division and separation, and here Fédéric Baron wished that a wall could also be a support for the "most beautiful of human feelings".

The red splashes on the wall symbolize parts of a broken heart and can be gathered to form a full heart.
