= Le Passe-muraille (sculpture) =

Sculpture in Luxembourg

Le passe-muraille
- Artist: Jean-Bernard Métais
- Year: 2006
- Type: Bronze
- Dimensions: 300 cm (120 in)
- Location: Luxembourg City; 49°36′55″N 6°07′45″E

Le passe-muraille (French: The Walker-Through-Walls), also known as Chambre sensorielle, is the name of a bronze sculpture created in 2006 by French sculptor Jean-Bernard Métais. It is located in the Pescatore section of Luxembourg City's Municipal Park and was set up over the old casemate network of the city.

The sculpture is made out of two bronze hemispheres; it is 3 meters high and has a diameter of 6 meters. One can enter Le Passe-muraille through these hemispheres. 8,000 holes let the landscape shine through.

Le passe-muraille was inaugurated on 24 December 2006, in the presence of architect Andrée Putman, Luxembourg City mayor Paul Helminger and other notable guests.

It does not carry the signature of the artist.
