= Brohan =

Brohan is a French surname. Notable people with the surname include:

- Jimmy Brohan (1935–2023), Irish sportsperson
- Augustine Brohan (1824–1893), French actress
- Augustine Susanne Brohan (1807–1887), French actress
- Émilie Madeleine Brohan (1833–1900), French actress

== See also ==
- Bröhan Museum
