= Bal du moulin de la Galette =

Painting by Pierre-Auguste Renoir

- Artist: Pierre-Auguste Renoir
- Year: 1876
- Medium: Oil on canvas
- Movement: Impressionism
- Dimensions: 131 cm × 175 cm (52 in × 69 in)
- Location: Musée d'Orsay; Paris

Bal du moulin de la Galette (commonly known as Dance at Le moulin de la Galette) is an 1876 painting by French artist Pierre-Auguste Renoir.

It is housed at the Musée d'Orsay in Paris and is one of Impressionism's most celebrated masterpieces. The painting depicts a typical Sunday afternoon at the original Moulin de la Galette in the district of Montmartre in Paris. In the late 19th century, working-class Parisians would dress up and spend time there dancing, drinking, and eating galettes into the evening. Like other works of Renoir's early maturity, Bal du moulin de la Galette is a typically Impressionist snapshot of real life. It shows a richness of form, a fluidity of brush stroke, and a flickering, sun-dappled light.

From 1879–94 the painting was in the collection of the French painter Gustave Caillebotte; when he died it became the property of the French Republic as payment for death duties. From 1896-1929 the painting hung in the Musée du Luxembourg in Paris. From 1929 it hung in the Louvre until it was transferred to the Musée d'Orsay in 1986.

== Smaller version ==
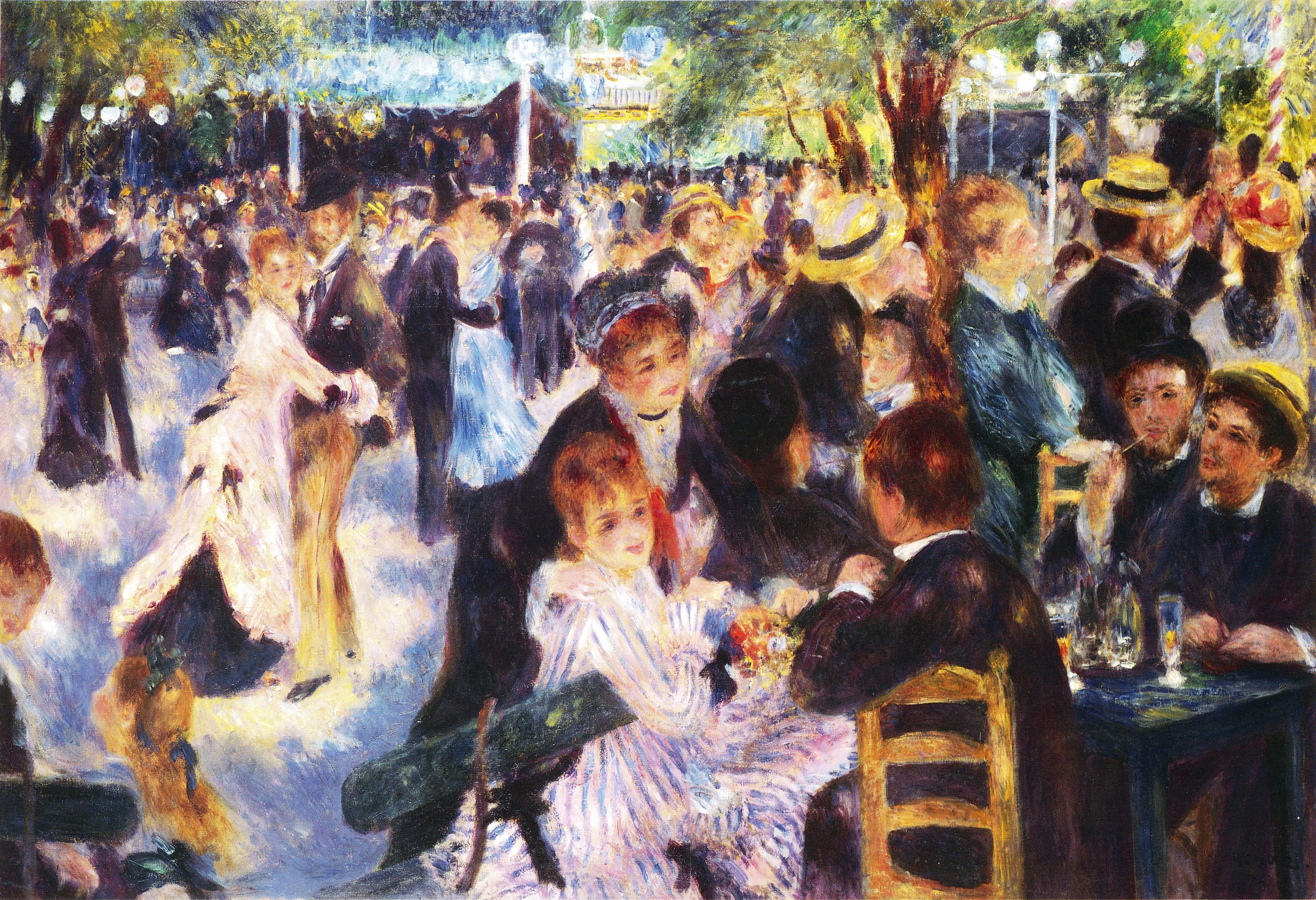
Smaller version

Renoir painted a smaller version of the picture (78 × 114 cm) with the same title. The painting is now believed to be in a private collection in Switzerland. Apart from their size, the two paintings are virtually identical, although the smaller is painted in a more fluid manner than the d'Orsay version. One is presumably a copy of the original, but it is not known which is the original. It is not even known which was the one first exhibited at the Salon of 1877, because though it was catalogued and given favourable attention by critics, its entry did not indicate the size of the painting.

For many years it was owned by John Hay Whitney. On May 17, 1990, his widow sold the painting for US$78 million at Sotheby's in New York City to Ryoei Saito (Saitō Ryōei), the honorary chairman of Daishowa Paper Manufacturing Company, Japan.

At the time of sale, it was one of the top two most expensive artworks ever sold, together with van Gogh's Portrait of Dr. Gachet, which was also purchased by Saito. Saito caused international outrage when he suggested in 1991 that he intended to cremate both paintings with him when he died. However, when Saito and his companies ran into severe financial difficulties, bankers who held the painting as collateral for loans arranged a confidential sale through Sotheby's to an undisclosed buyer. Although not known for certain, the painting is believed to be in the hands of a Swiss collector.

== Genesis ==
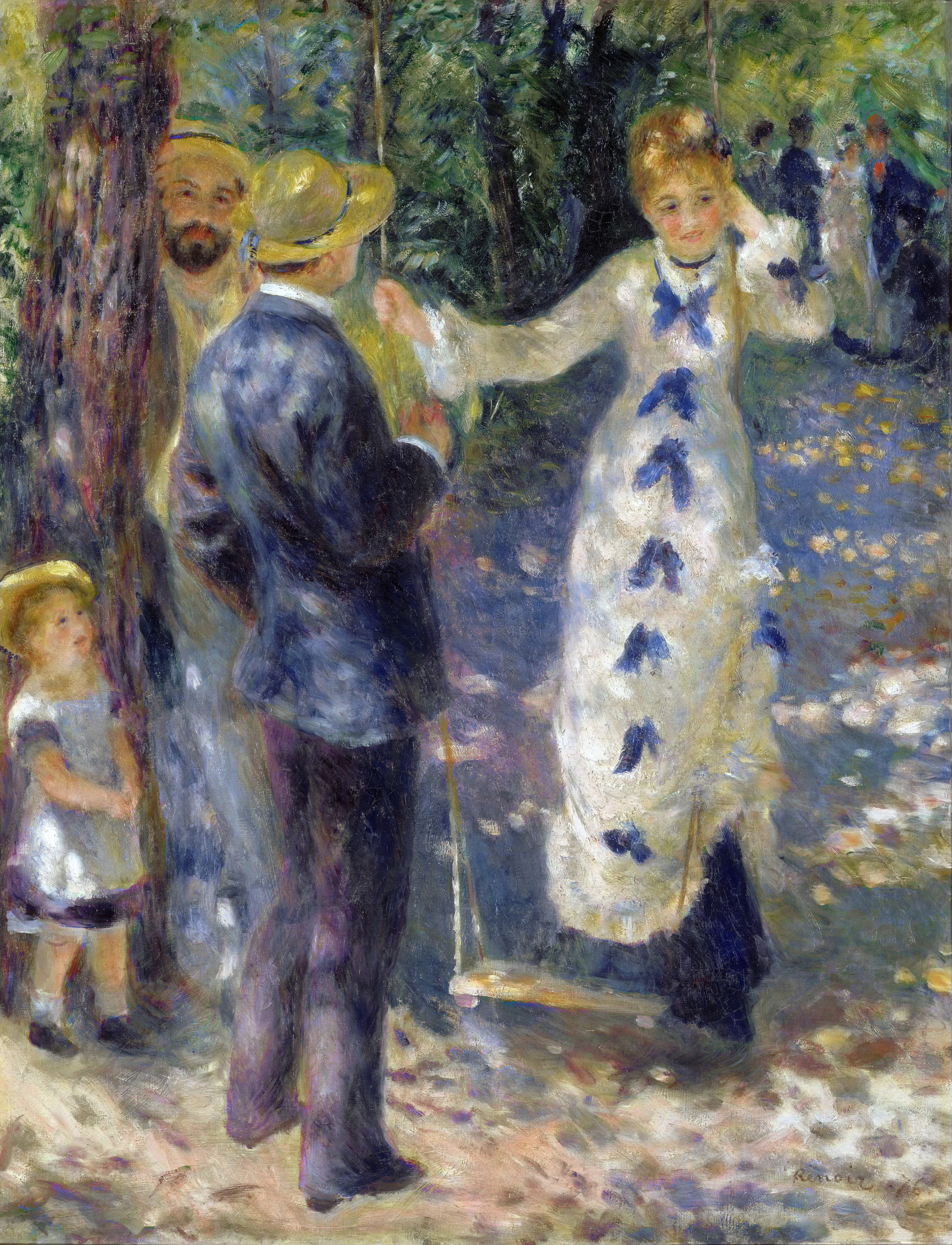
Renoir's La balançoire (The Swing), 1876

Renoir conceived his project of painting the dancing at Le Moulin de la Galette in May 1876 and its execution is described in full by his civil servant friend Georges Rivière in his memoir Renoir et ses amis. Renoir needed to set up a studio near the mill. A suitable studio was found at an abandoned cottage in the rue Cortot with a garden described by Rivière as a "beautiful abandoned park". Several of Renoir's major works were painted in this garden at this time, including La balançoire (The Swing). The gardens and its buildings have been preserved as the Musée de Montmartre.

Rivière identified several of the personalities in the painting. Despite Renoir's habit of distributing a sought after fashionable hat of the time amongst his models (the straw bonnet with a wide red ribbon top right is an example of this hat, called a timbale), he was unable to persuade his favourite sixteen-year-old model Jeanne Samary, who appears in La balançoire, to pose as principal for the painting (in fact she was conducting an affair with a local boy at the time). It is her sister Estelle who poses as the girl wearing a blue and pink striped dress. These two girls came to Le Moulin every Sunday with their family; with two younger sisters barely taller than the tables, and their mother and father, properly chaperoned by their mother (entry was free for girls at Le Moulin and not all were models of virtue). Beside her is a group consisting of Pierre-Franc Lamy and Norbert Goeneutte (also appearing in La balançoire), fellow painters, as well as Rivière himself. Behind her, amongst the dancers, are to be found Henri Gervex, Eugène Pierre Lestringuez and Paul Lhote (who appears in Dance in the Country). In the middle distance, at the centre of the dance hall, the Cuban painter Don Pedro Vidal de Solares y Cardenas is depicted in striped trousers, dancing with the model called Margot (Marguerite Legrand). Apparently, the exuberant Margot found Solares too reserved and was endeavouring to loosen him up by dancing polkas with him, and teaching him dubious songs in the local slang. She was to die of typhoid just two years later, Renoir nursing her until the end, paying both for her treatment and her funeral.

Rivière describes the painting as executed on the spot and not without difficulty, as the wind constantly threatened to blow the canvas away. This has led some critics to speculate that it was the larger d'Orsay painting that was painted here, as the smaller would have been easier to control. On the other hand, the smaller is much the more spontaneous and freely worked of the two, characteristic of en plein air work.

== In popular culture ==
A homage to this painting appears as the cover art of A Night on the Town, the 1976 album of singer-songwriter Rod Stewart with Stewart replacing the man, in the centre, wearing the straw boater.

In the film Back to the Future Part II, the painting appears as a background screensaver in the McFly residence during the 2015 scene in which the older Marty prepares to take a video call.

== See also ==
- List of most expensive paintings
- List of paintings by Pierre-Auguste Renoir
