= The Swing (Renoir) =

1876 painting by Pierre-Auguste Renoir

La Balançoire
- The Swing (English)
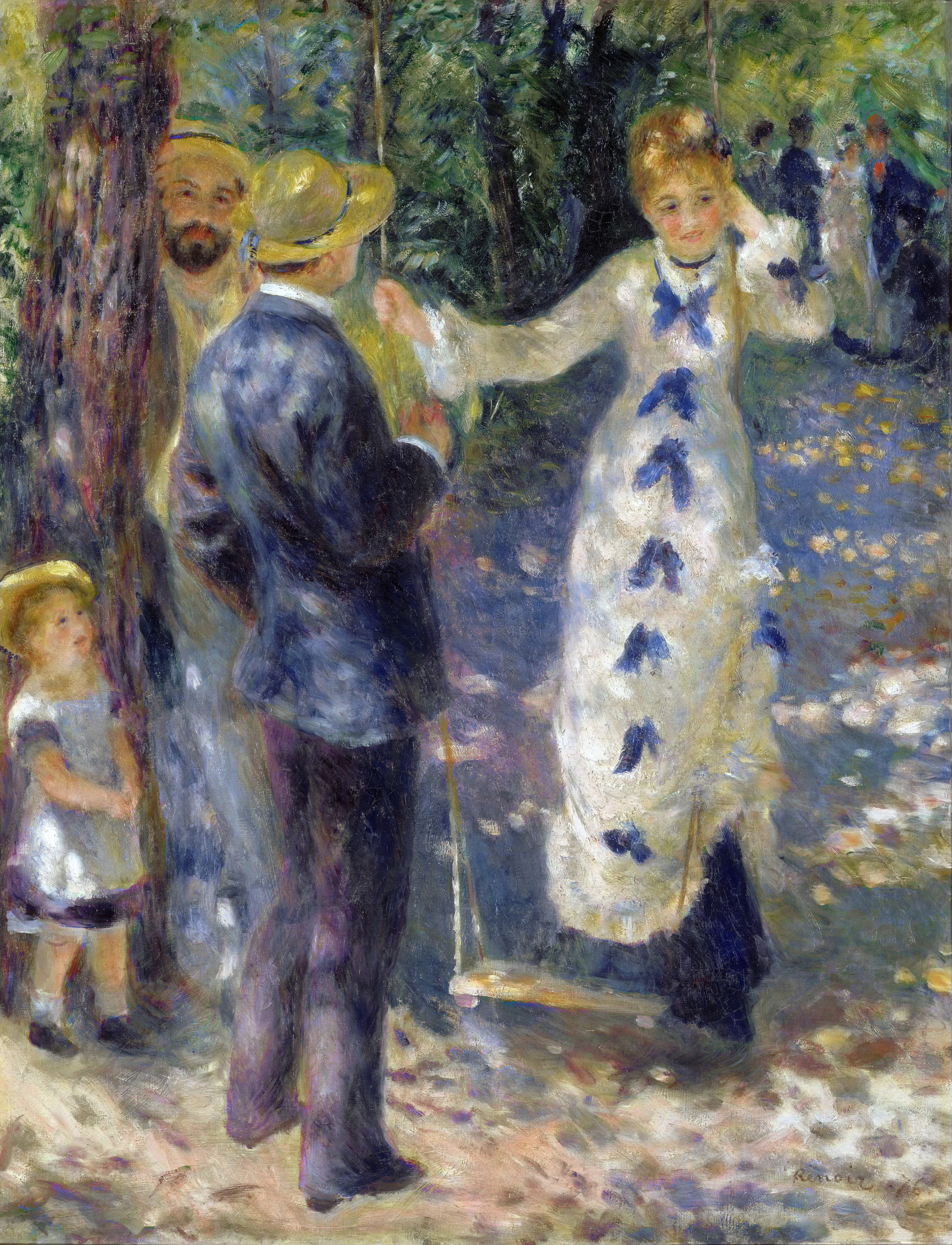
- Artist: Pierre-Auguste Renoir
- Year: 1876
- Medium: Oil-on-canvas
- Dimensions: 92 cm × 73 cm (36.2 in × 28.7 in)
- Location: Musée d'Orsay, Paris

The Swing (French: La Balançoire) is an oil-on-canvas painting made in the summer of 1876 by the French Impressionist artist Pierre-Auguste Renoir. The painting depicts model Jeanne Samary, Norbert Goeneutte, and Renoir's brother Edmond. The painting combines eighteenth-century techniques with modern elements.

The Swing has been compared to the works of artists including Monet and Watteau. Renoir executed the painting in what are now the Musée de Montmartre gardens. He had rented a cottage in the gardens so that he could be closer to the Moulin de la Galette where he was simultaneously engaged in painting his 1876 Bal du moulin de la Galette. Both paintings were presented at the third Impressionist group exhibition in 1877. The painting was acquired in 1877, shortly after the exhibition, by Gustave Caillebotte and later moved to the Musée d'Orsay.

== Description ==
This scene depicts Edmond Renoir (the artist's brother), Norbert Goeneutte, and Jeanne Samary, a young working woman from Montmartre and a favourite model of Renoir's who appears in many of his other works. Seemingly lost in thought, Jeanne stands on a swing hanging from a tree while Norbert and Edmond try to capture her attention. Jeanne listens passively to the man in front of her while a young neighborhood girl in her everyday dress gazes up at the interaction. Renoir noted to his friend Georges Rivière that the girl had been watching him while he worked. Unbeknownst to the girl, Renoir included her in his final painting.

In the distance behind Jeanne, a small group of people stand chatting. The forest floor under their feet is flecked with pink, white, and lavender-coloured blossoms. The quivering light is rendered by the patches of pale colour, particularly on the clothing and the ground. The painting is set in the Montmartre gardens, where many artists would come to paint under the natural light. The art historian Robert Herbert noted that the setting served as a sort of oasis, insulated from the bustling city around it.

The clothing in the painting reflects the fashions of the time. Jeanne's dress, central to the painting, reflects the "close-fitting line" of the princess style. According to the fashion historian Birgit Haase, the dress appears to be made of white muslin, and its contours suggest that the woman is wearing a cuirass corset. The dress is decorated with a row of blue bows down the front, matching the colour of the petticoat seen beneath the lifted hem. In similar fashion, the two men's outfits were informal, reflecting the style of the working class at that time. The casual dress in this painting adds to the relaxed, leisurely, and intimate atmosphere of the garden scene.

== Technique ==
Renoir started out as a porcelain painter, incorporating the delicacy and elegance of eighteenth-century art into his work. He continued on with this style as he rose to fame as a painter. Renoir admired the eighteenth-century depiction of society as idyllic and carefree, and he adopted its light and airy colour palette. This palette departed from the stark light-dark contrast of earlier styles, instead favouring small brushstrokes that separated colours, placing emphasis on air, light, and movement.

In The Swing, Renoir's loose, short brushstrokes create the effect of sunlight filtering through leaves, capturing a sense of warmth and movement. This technique directs the viewer's attention to the play of light and shadow, emphasizing the lively, atmospheric quality of the scene rather than precise forms. His brushwork appears to transform the scene into a blend of loose strokes and coloured dots. It was these dots, in particular, that sparked outrage among art critics, as they were reminded of splattered grease.

== Influences ==
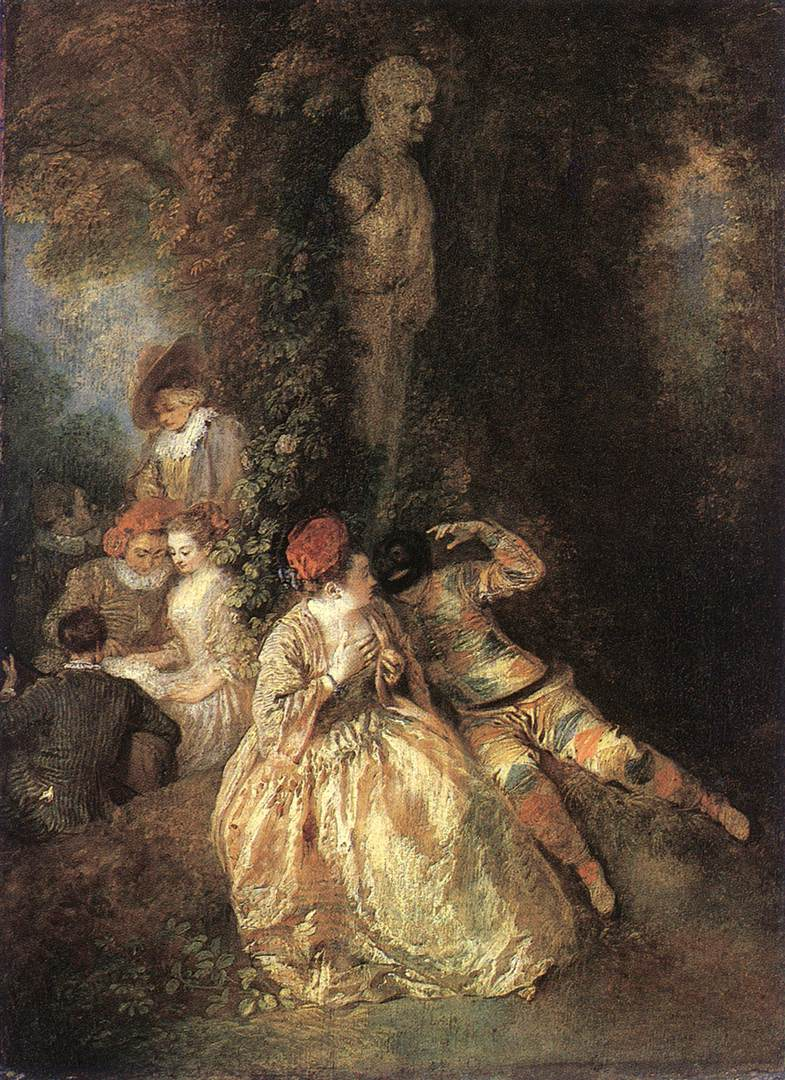
Antoine Watteau, Harlequin and Columbine, 1716-18

Renoir greatly admired the works of Watteau, Boucher, and Fragonard, and their influence is observable in many of his works. This painting is especially evocative of fête galante paintings of the eighteenth-century Rococo style. The idyllic park landscape, leisurely and flirtatious scene, soft colour palette, and wistful atmosphere in The Swing are all reminiscent of earlier fêtes galantes by artists like Antoine Watteau. Renoir's friend Georges Rivière explicitly commented on the similarities between The Swing and Watteau's works on the occasion of the third Impressionist exhibition. Watteau's Harlequin and Columbine, which Renoir could have seen when it was exhibited in 1860, provides one example of the sort of painting that may have inspired the artist.

Renoir's artwork was also influenced by contemporary critics. Eugène Fromentin had condemned earlier French genre painters such as Greuze for emphasizing a clear subject with a moral message. He favoured seventeenth-century Dutch genre painting, which he believed did not focus on a moralizing narrative. In the following years, Renoir gradually stripped his genre scenes of clear narrative elements. He gave his canvases vague titles, often just describing the scene in the most general terms. The content of his art is similarly ambiguous. In The Swing, there is no indication of a reason for the woman's gesture or to her relationship to the two men. The presence of the child also goes without clear explanation, complicating any attempt to read the work in narrative terms. Furthermore, Renoir created The Swing in a time of social control. Clear interpretation and classification made it easier for authorities to censor any art that violated their strict behavior codes. According to the art historian John House, Renoir protected his work from possible suppression by avoiding clear narratives in favour of ambiguity.

== Commentary and criticism ==
Antoine Watteau, The Embarkation for Cythera, 1717

The Swing is often compared to both contemporary and older art. Birgit Hasse has noted similarities to the work of James Tissot, but she also observes that Tissot usually depicted high-end fashion, whereas Renoir was partial to working-class dress, as seen in The Swing.

Renoir's admiration for eighteenth-century art aligns him with Monet, whose paintings similarly continued the traditions of the fête galante. Georges Rivière compared The Swing to Watteau's The Embarkation for Cythera. The leisurely air of The Swing was also compared to another of Renoir's paintings, Dance at Le moulin de la Galette.

Pierre-Auguste Renoir, Dance at Le moulin de la Galette, 1876

The painting, together with Renoir's 1876 Bal du moulin de la Galette, was presented at the third Impressionist group exhibition in 1877. The painting was acquired in 1877, shortly after the exhibition, by Gustave Caillebotte and later moved to the Musée d'Orsay. Critics' reactions to The Swing were mixed, ranging from admiration to harsh disapproval. Some praised its idyllic charm, with Georges Rivière contrasting the peaceful scene with the chaotic Dance at Le moulin de la Galette. He praised Renoir's serene depiction of young people enjoying life in a sunlit garden, removed from the concerns of the world. However, others were less kind. When it was shown at the 1877 exhibition, one critic dismissed the light effects as resembling grease stains. Another criticized Renoir's blue as violent and took offense to it.

== See also ==
- List of paintings by Pierre-Auguste Renoir
- The Swing, a painting by Jean-Honoré Fragonard (c. 1767)
