= Jeanne Samary =

French actress (1857–1890)

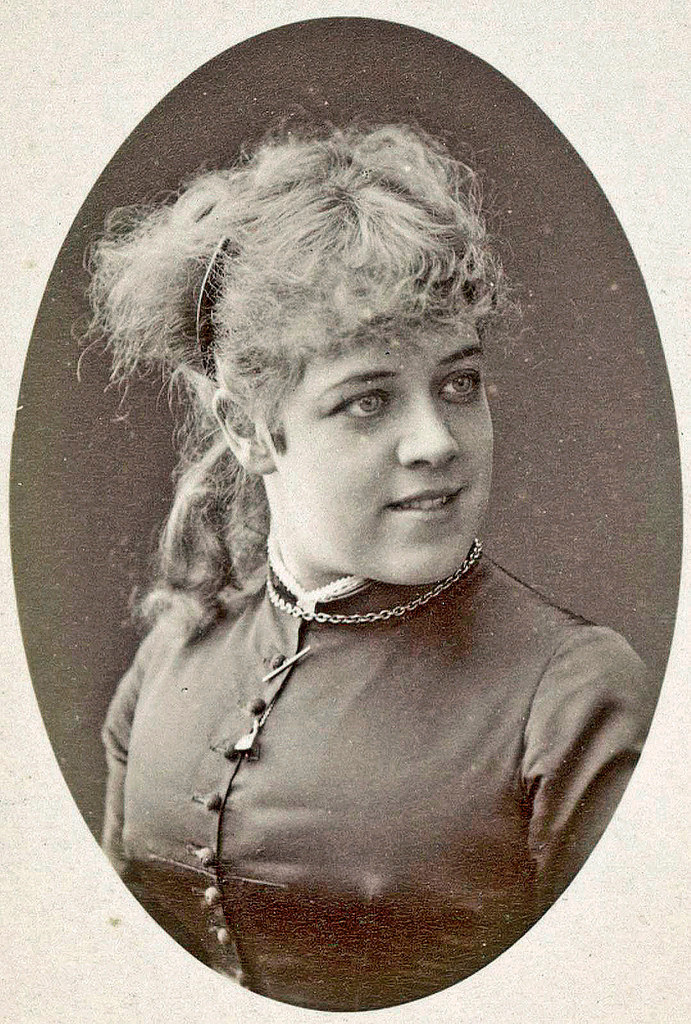
- Photograph by Nadar, c. 1877
- Born: Léontine Pauline Jeanne Samary; 4 March 1857; Neuilly-sur-Seine, France
- Died: 18 September 1890 (aged 33); Paris, France
- Burial place: Passy Cemetery
- Occupations: Actor, model
- Years active: 1874–1890
- Employer: Comédie-Française
- Spouse: Paul Lagarde (1882–1890, her death)
- Relatives: Augustine Brohan (aunt); Madeleine Brohan (aunt); Susanne Brohan (grandmother)

Jeanne Samary (4 March 1857 as Léontine Pauline Jeanne Samary in Neuilly-sur-Seine – 18 September 1890 in Paris) was a French actress at the Comédie-Française and a model for Auguste Renoir, including for Renoir's 1881 painting, Luncheon of the Boating Party.

Between the years 1871–1874, Jeanne Samary attended the Paris drama school and passed with distinction. In 1874, she became a member of the Comédie-Française and debuted on 24 August 1874 as Dorine in Tartuffe by Molière. Jeanne Samary excelled in numerous roles in the comedies, but also in parts of Édouard Pailleron (L'Étincelle; Le Monde où l'on s'ennuie).

Renoir painted Samary around a dozen times between the years 1877–1881; Louise Abbéma painted her twice.

In 1880, she married Paul Lagarde, with whom she had three children. Shortly before her death she wrote a children's book titled Les gourmandises de Charlotte for their children. She died in 1890 of typhoid fever, and was buried in the Passy Cemetery.

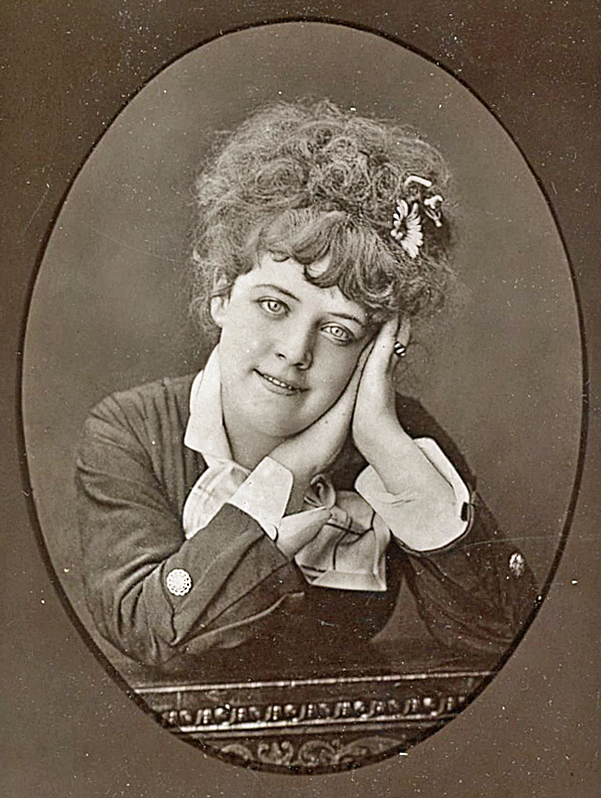

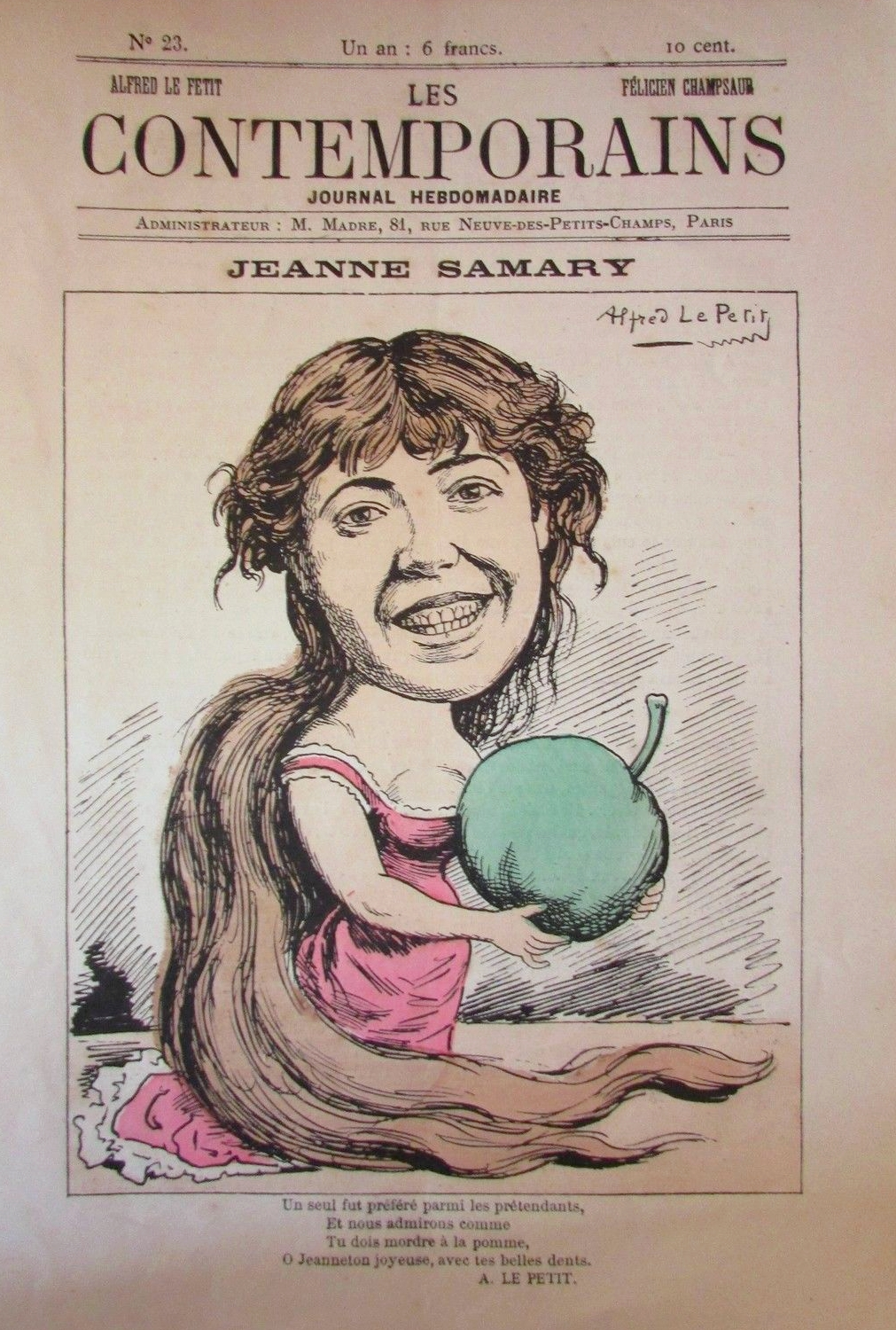

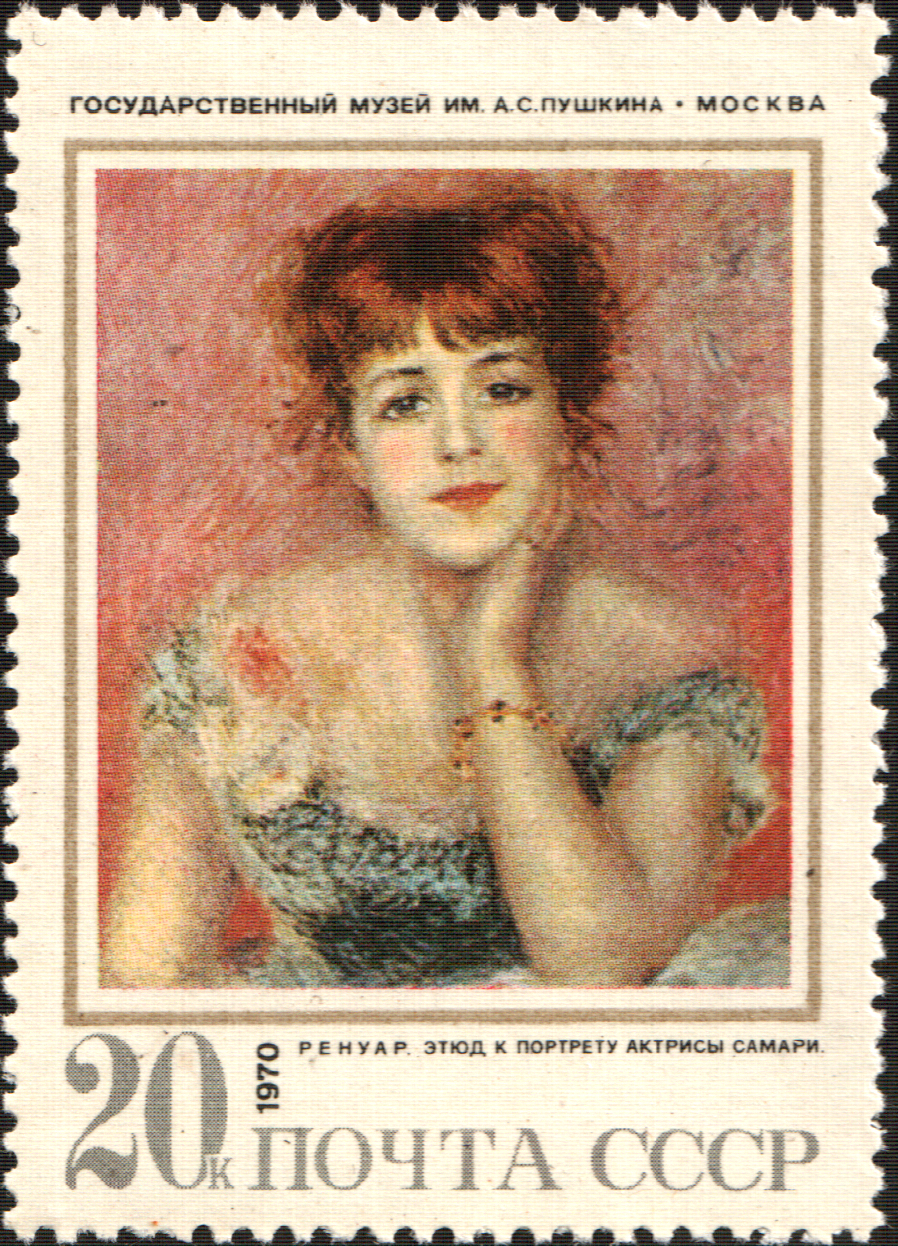

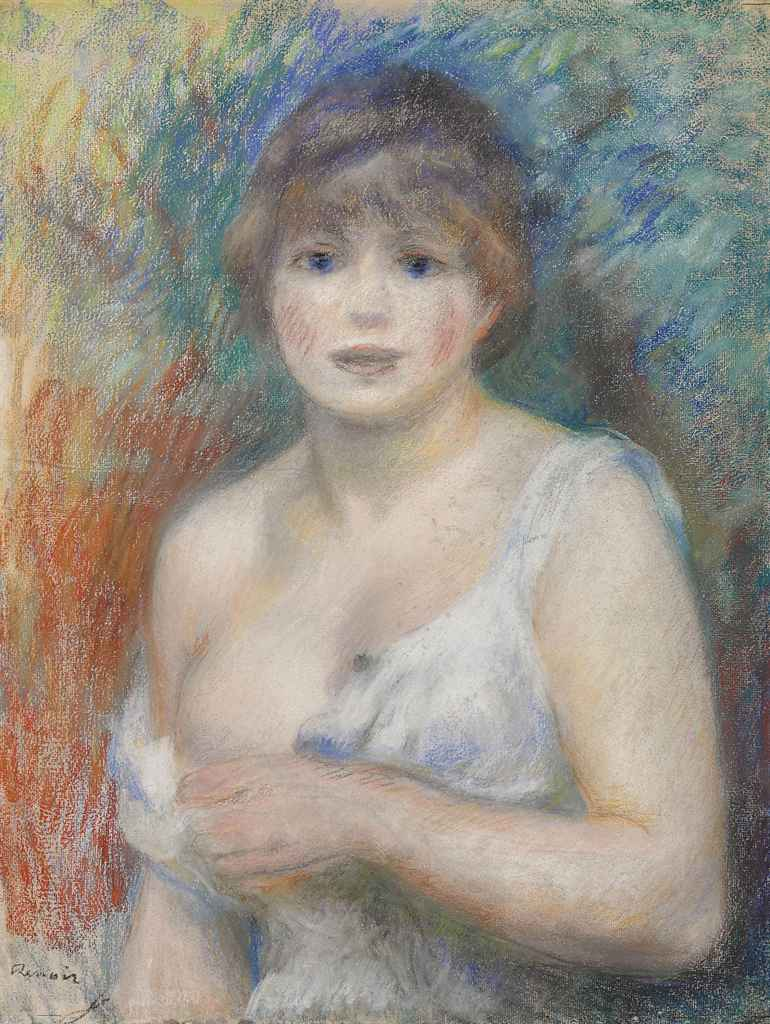

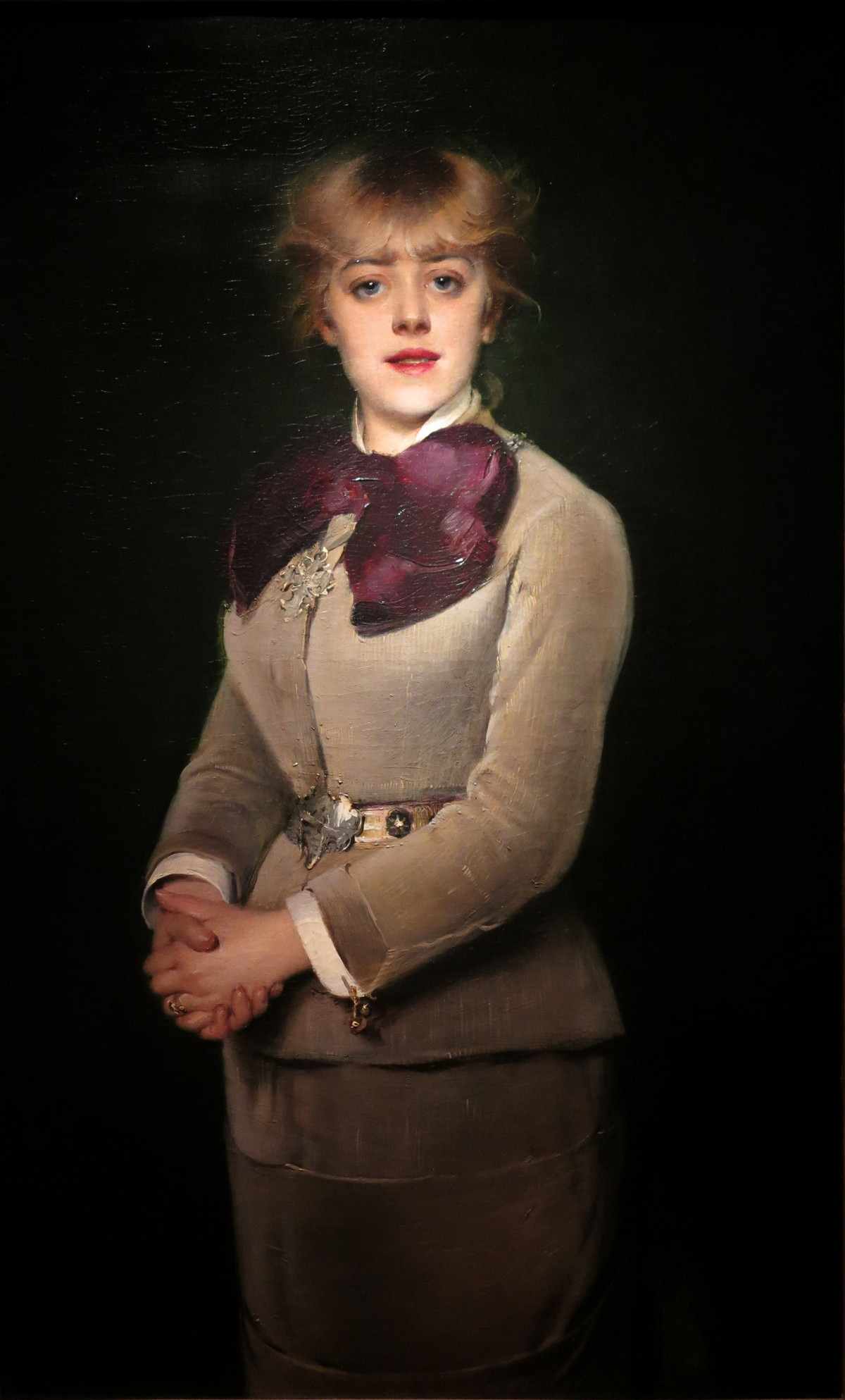
Portrait of Jeanne Samary, by Louise Abbéma (ca. 1880)

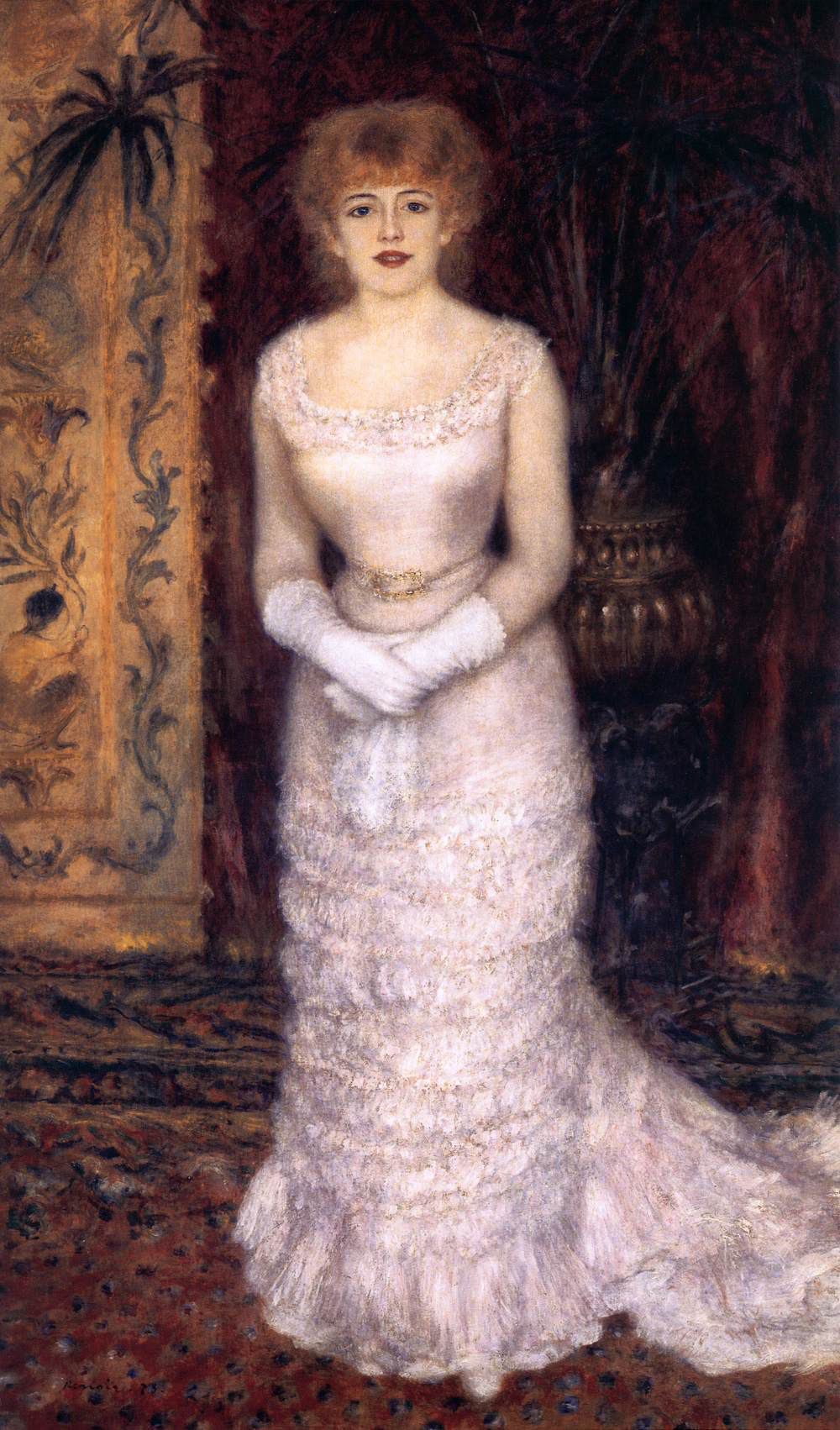
Portrait of Jeanne Samary by Renoir (1878), Hermitage Museum, St. Petersburg, Russia

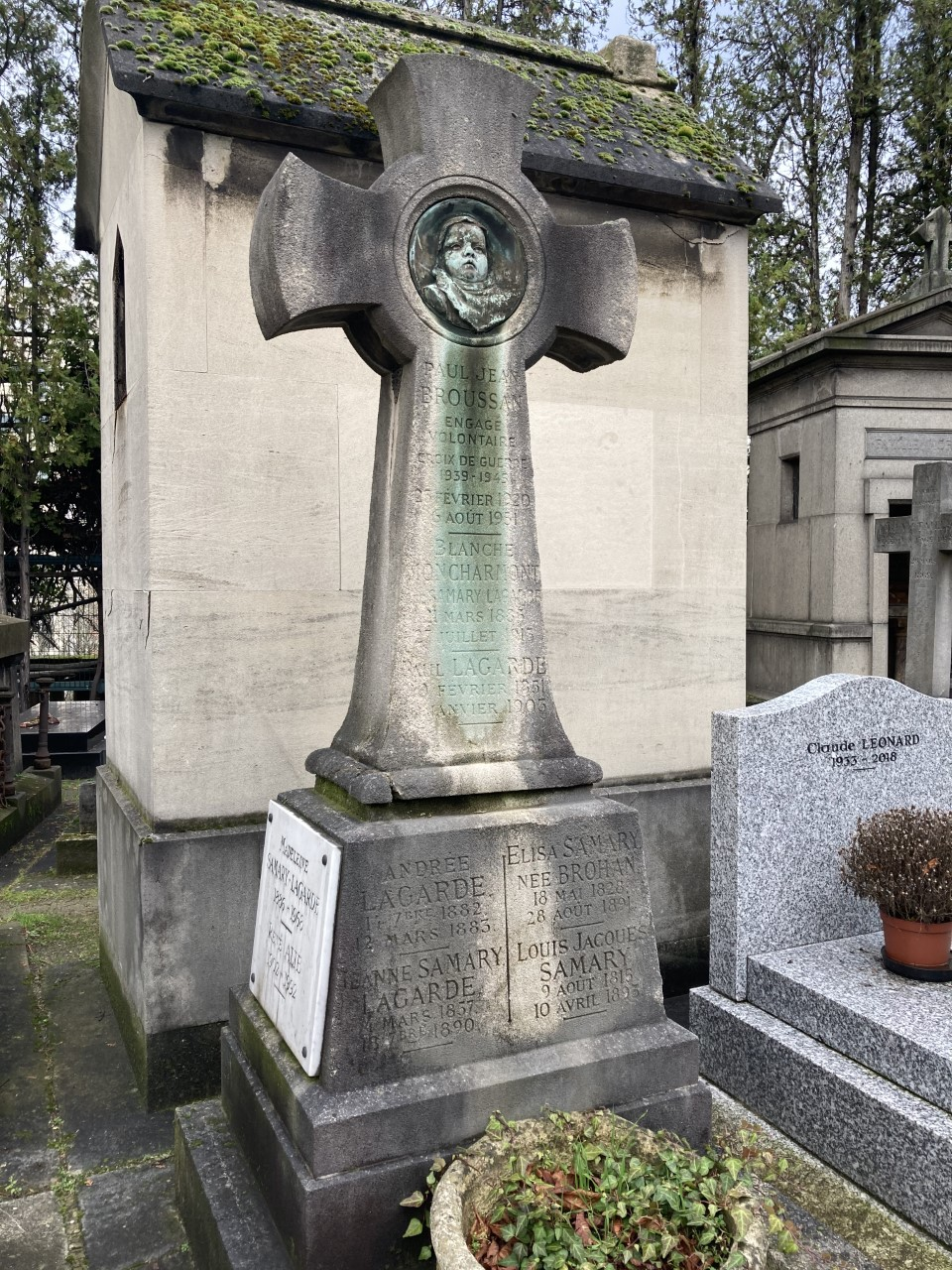
Samary's grave in Passy Cemetery

Renoir portrait of Jeanne Samary 1877
