= The Day Dream (Renoir) =

1877 painting by Pierre-Auguste Renoir

Portrait of Jeanne Samary
- Artist: Pierre-Auguste Renoir
- Year: 1877
- Medium: Oil on canvas
- Dimensions: 56 cm × 47 cm (22 in × 19 in)
- Location: Pushkin Museum, Moscow

The Daydream (French - La Rêverie) or Portrait of Jeanne Samary is an oil on canvas painting by Pierre-Auguste Renoir, from 1877. It is held at the Pushkin Museum, in Moscow. It portrays Jeanne Samary, a young actress at the Comédie-Française in Paris who had made her début as Dorine in Tartuffe in 1875 and lived on Rue Frochot, not far from Renoir's home. He painted her several times, including Portrait of Jeanne Samary (1878, Hermitage Museum).

The work was exhibited at the Third Impressionist Exhibition in 1877, where it received a largely negative reception. It later formed part of Ivan Morozov's collection, which was seized by the Soviet state after the October Revolution. It appeared on a USSR stamp in 1970.

== See also ==
- List of paintings by Pierre-Auguste Renoir
