= Portrait of Jeanne Samary =

1878 painting by Pierre-Auguste Renoir

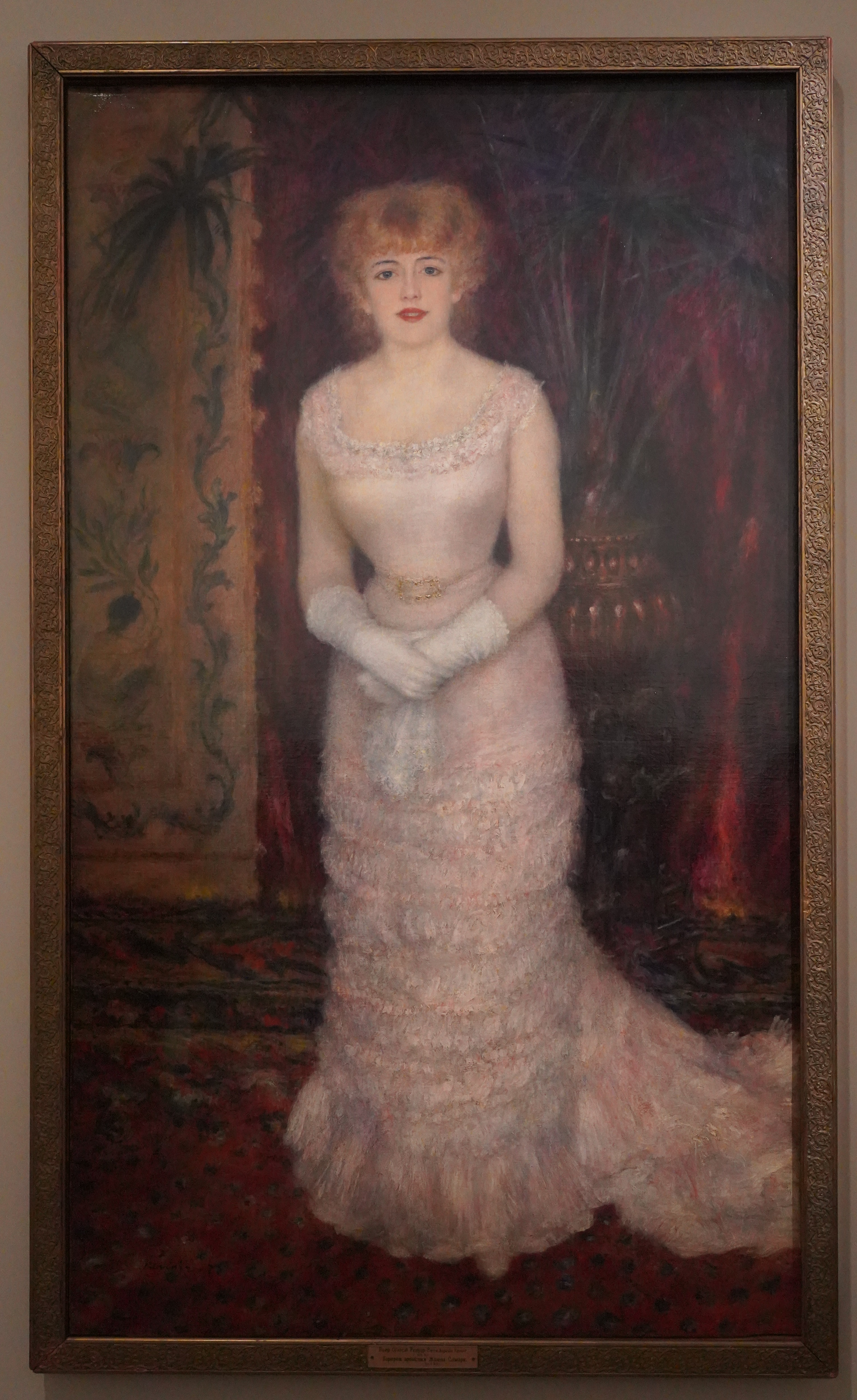
Portrait of Jeanne Samary (1878) by Pierre-Auguste Renoir

Portrait of Jeanne Samary is an oil on canvas painting by Pierre-Auguste Renoir, depicting the actress Jeanne Samary, from 1878. It is held in the Hermitage Museum, in Saint Petersburg. It was exhibited at the Paris Salon of 1879 and intended to make good on the critical failure of his previous portrait of her, but it made little impression on the critics. It was seized by the Soviet state after the October Revolution as part of the seizure of Ivan Morozov's art collection.

== See also ==
- List of paintings by Pierre-Auguste Renoir
