= Musée de Montmartre =

French museum and former home of several artists, including Renoir and Valadon

Coordinates: 48.8877°N 2.3406°E

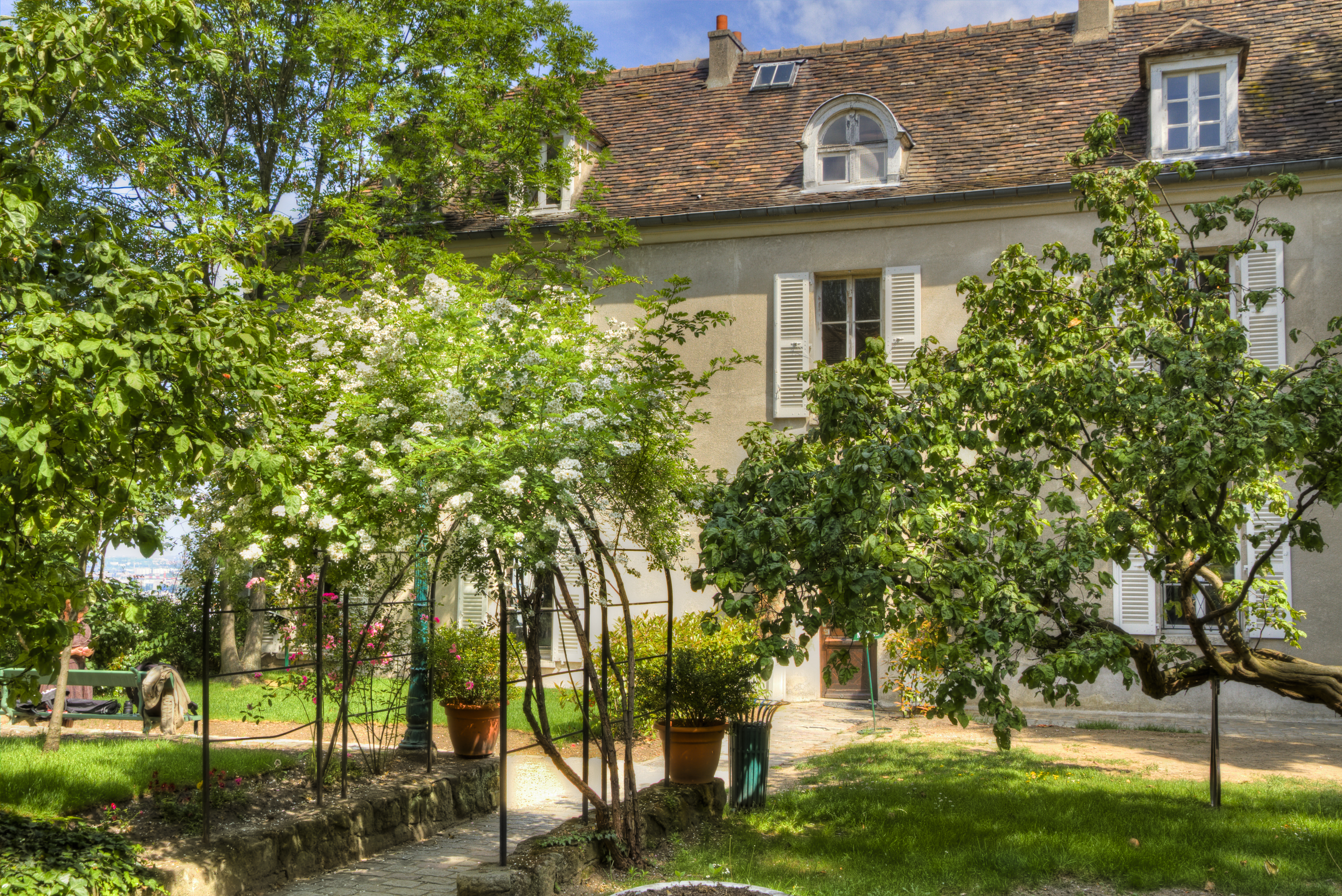
- Established: 1960
- Location: 12, rue Cortot - 75018 Paris, France
- Website: www.museedemontmartre.fr

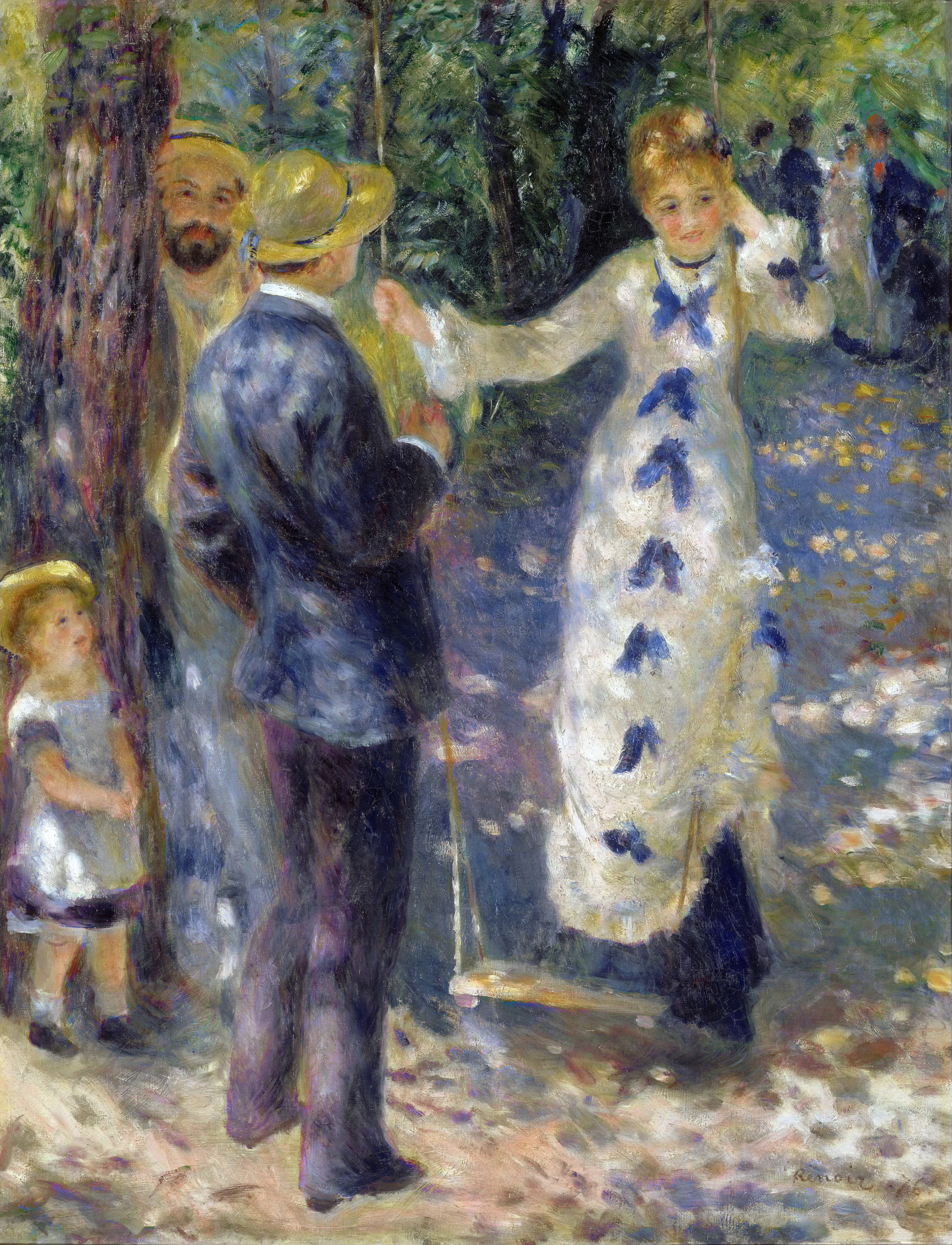
The Swing, by former resident Pierre-Auguste Renoir, depicts the garden and was painted on site (1876)

The Musée de Montmartre (French pronunciation: [myze də mɔ̃maʁtʁ], Montmartre Museum) is located in Montmartre, at 8-14 rue Cortot in the 18th (XVIII) arrondissement of Paris, France. It was founded in 1960 and was classified as a Musée de France in 2003. The buildings were formerly the home of several famous artists, including Pierre-Auguste Renoir and Suzanne Valadon.

== Description ==
The museum is housed in buildings which are three centuries old, the Hotel Demarne and the Maison du Bel Air. The 17th-century French actor Rosimond acquired the house in 1680.

It was home to many famous artists and writers such as Pierre-Auguste Renoir who painted his celebrated La Balançoire and Le Bal du Moulin de la Galette here in 1876. As a home its residents included:

- Suzanne Valadon, her home and studio
- Maurice Utrillo, Valadon's son, painter
- André Utter, Valadon's husband, painter
- Émile Bernard
- The fauves Othon Friesz and Raoul Dufy
- Demetrios Galanis
- Francisque Poulbot
- Léon Bloy
- Pierre Reverdy

== The collections ==
The collections of the museum belong to the association Le Vieux Montmartre, created in 1886, and contains paintings, photographs, posters and manuscripts that depict the history of the neighbourhood, its effervescence, the bohème and cabarets from the nineteenth and twentieth centuries.

The collection includes Le Cabaret du Chat Noir by Steinlen, Bruant au Mirliton, Le Divan Japonais or Le Moulin Rouge by Toulouse-Lautrec, La Place Pigalle by Maurice Utrillo, L’Autoportrait by Suzanne Valadon, Parce Domine by Willette, L’enseigne du Lapin Agile as well as the magnificent Théâtre d’ombres by Henri Rivière.

== Renoir’s Gardens and the vineyard ==
The gardens have been renovated according to Renoir’s paintings. They provide a good view of the vineyard, which has existed since the Middle Ages and was replanted in 1933. According to the New York Times, its working vineyard is said to make the most expensive bad wine in the city.

== Renovation ==
The site belongs to the city of Paris. In 2011, its management was entrusted to the Kléber Rossillon firm, which has plans to double the exhibition space. Suzanne Valadon’s studio and the Hotel Demarne were renovated in 2014.

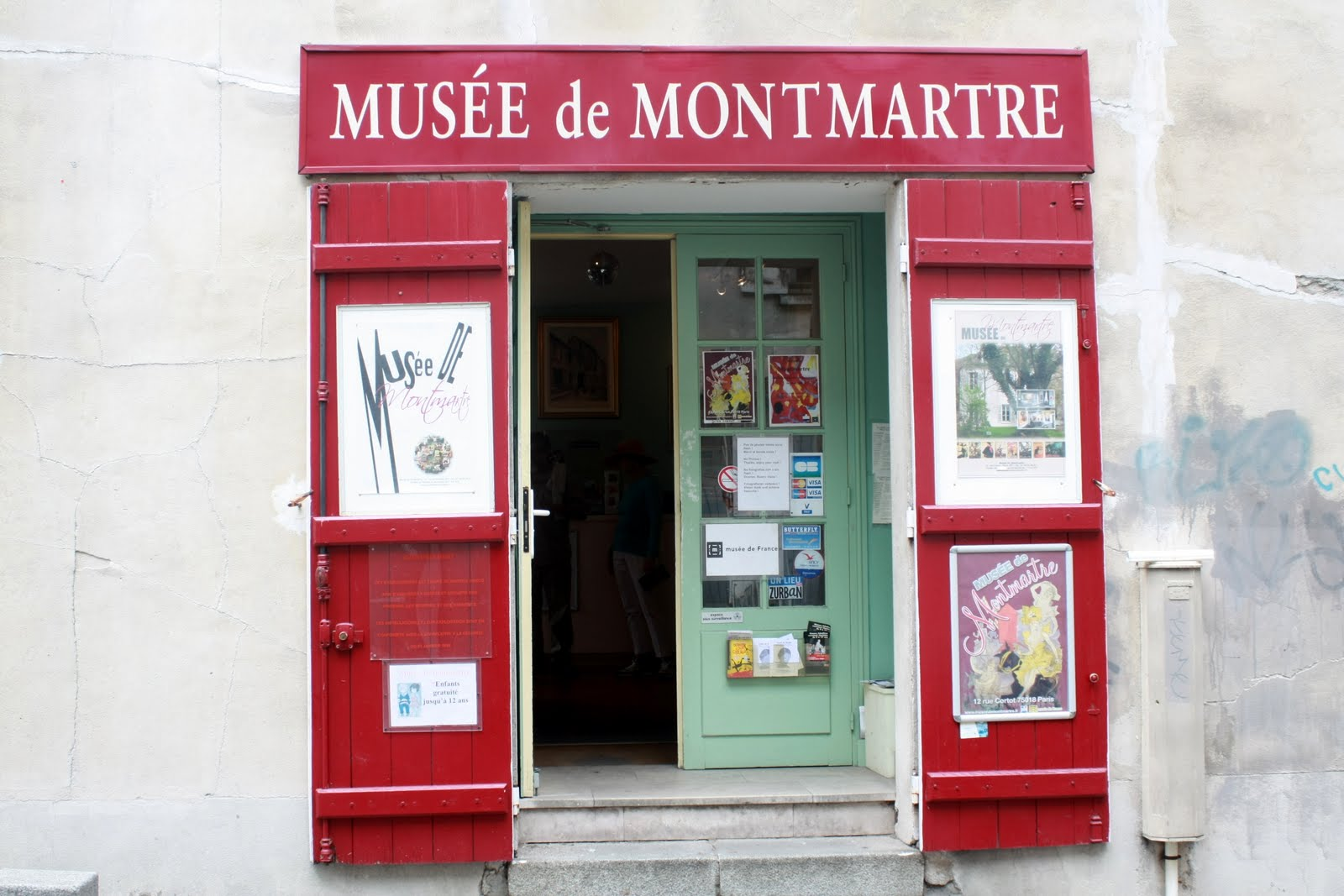
Entrance of Musée de Montmartre.

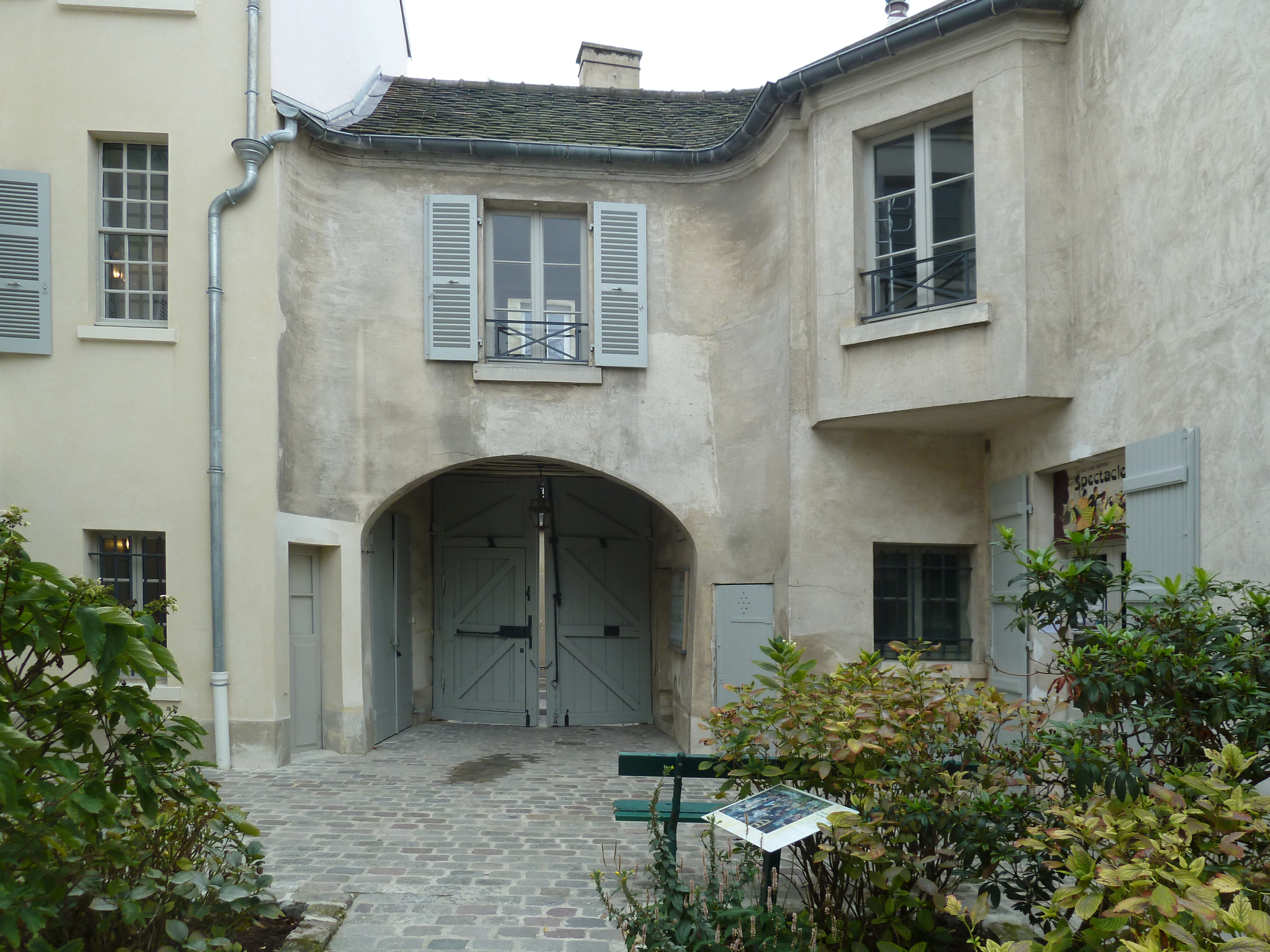
Courtyard.

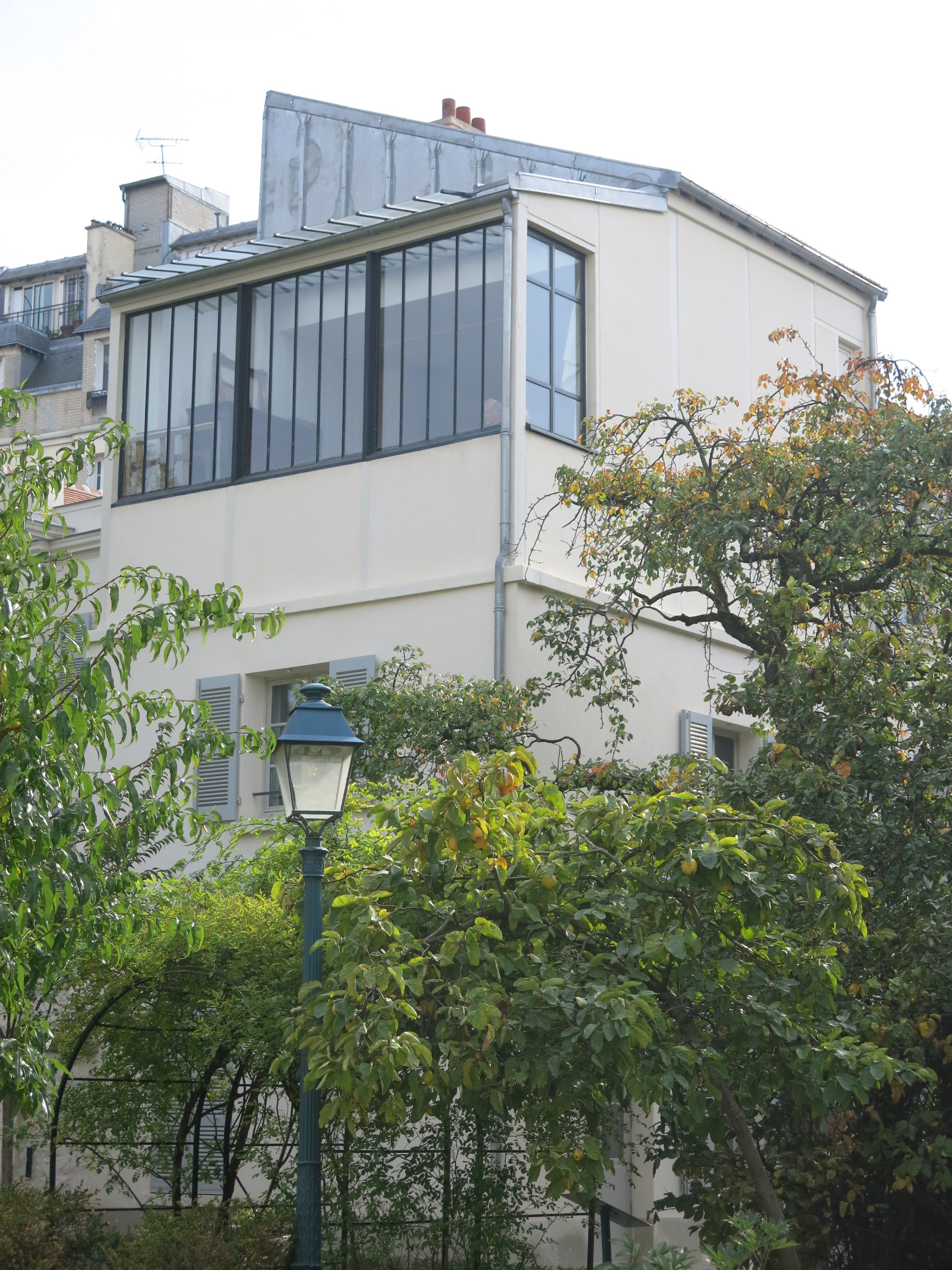
Suzanne Valadon’s studio.

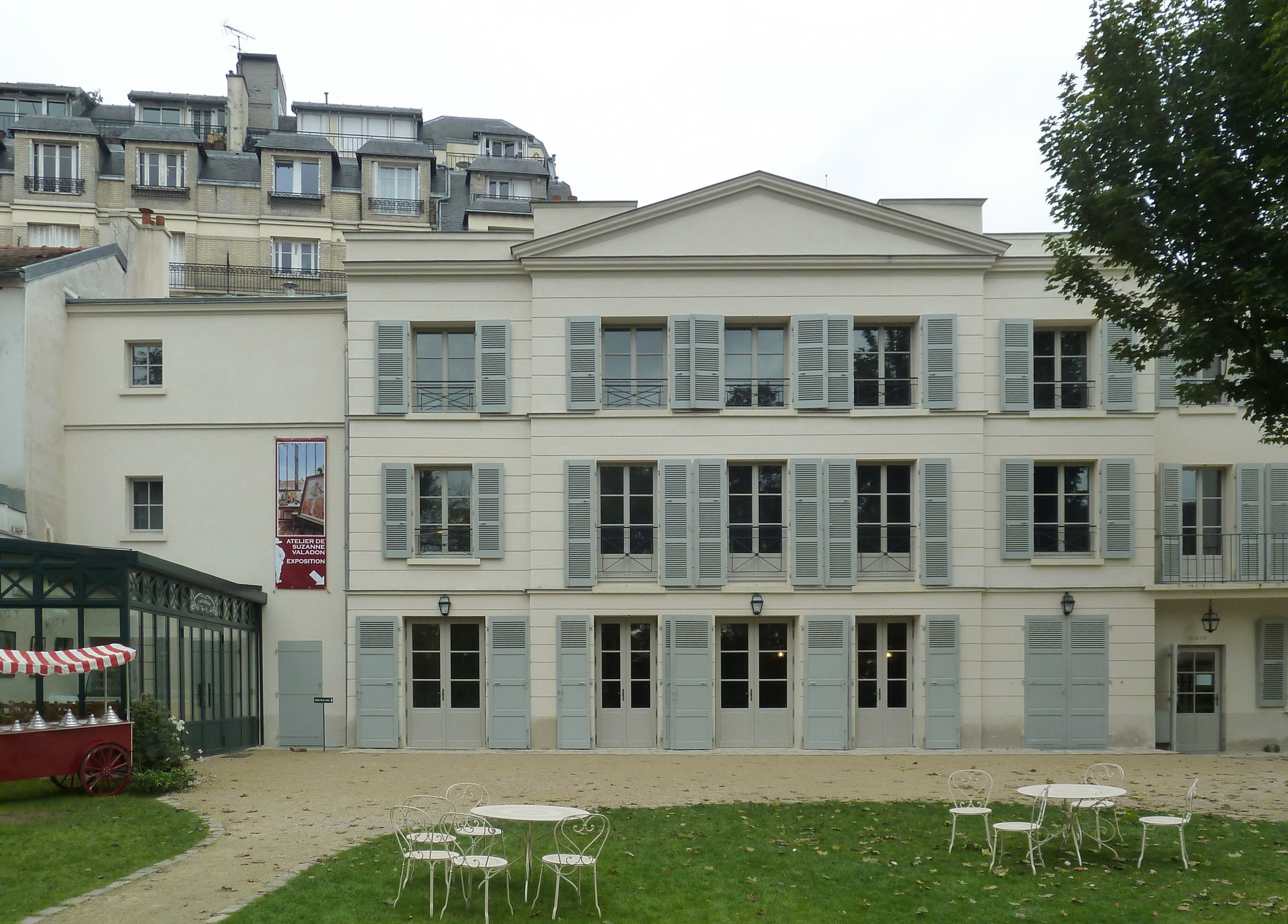
Hôtel Demarne.

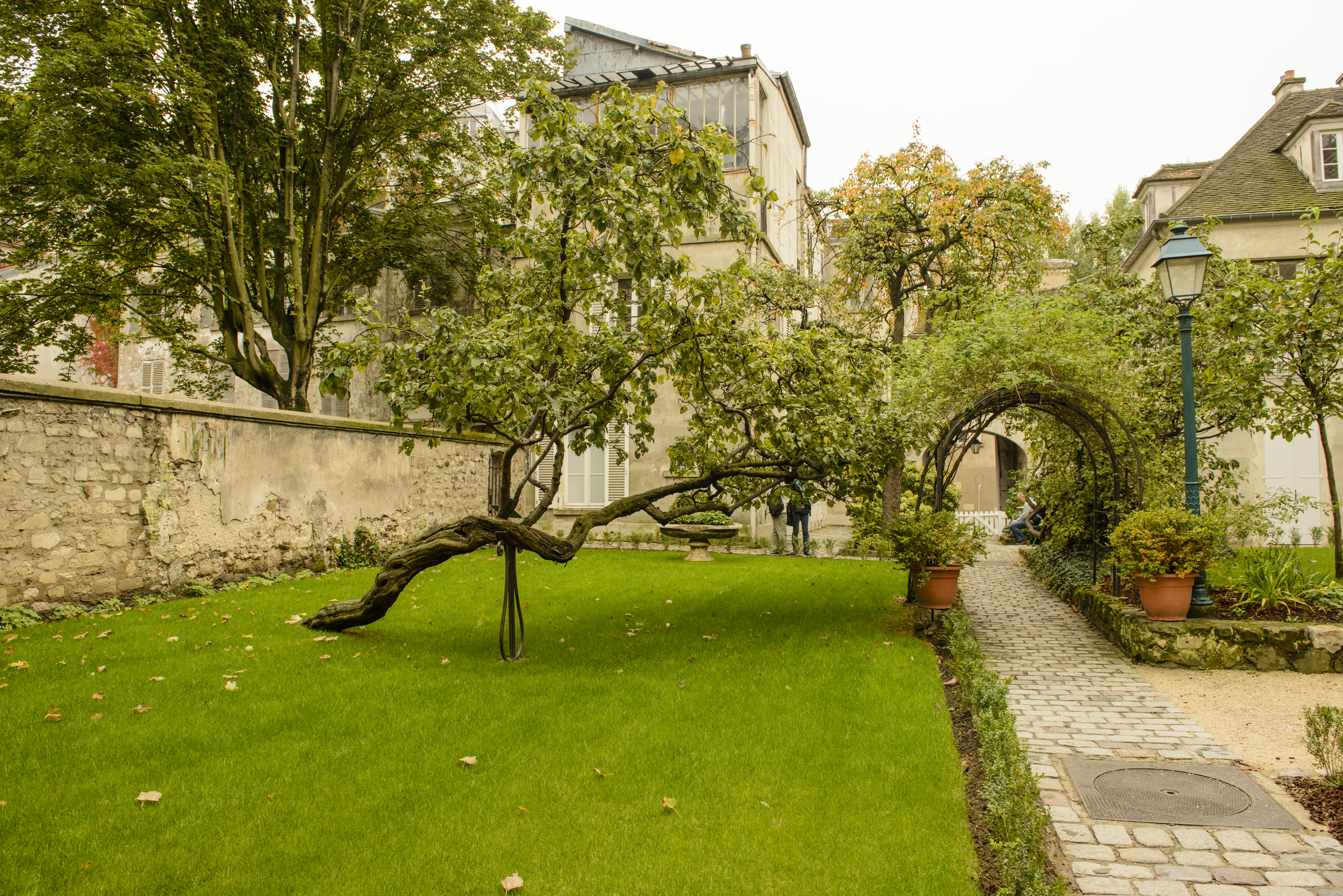
Renoir’s Gardens.

== Opening times ==
The museum is open all year every day from 10 a.m. to 6 p.m. An admission fee is charged.

== See also ==
- List of museums in Paris
