= Augustine Brohan =

French actress (1824–1893)

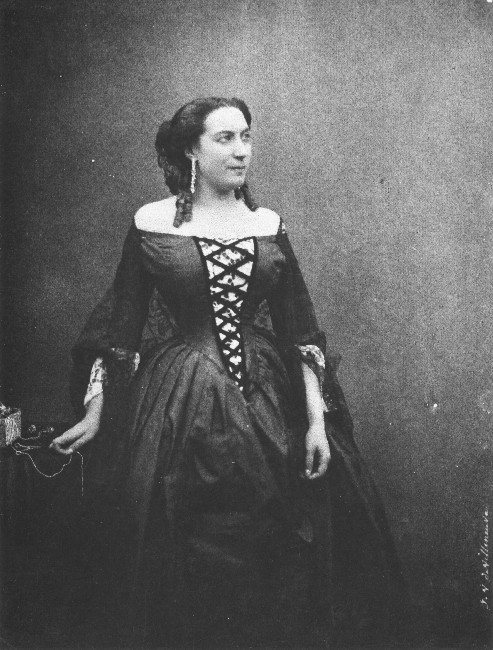
Augustine Brohan

Joséphine-Félicité-Augustine Brohan (1824–1893) was a French actress.

The eldest daughter of Augustine Susanne Brohan and the sister of Émilie Madeleine Brohan, she was admitted to the Conservatoire when very young, twice taking the second prize for comedy.

The soubrette part, entrusted for more than 150 years at the Comédie-Française to a succession of artists of the first rank, was at the moment without a representative, and Mlle Augustine Brohan made her debut there on May 19, 1841, as Dorine in Tartuffe, and Lise in Rivaux deux-mêmes.

She was immediately admitted pensionnaire, and at the end of eighteen months unanimously elected sociétaire. She soon became a great favorite, not only in the plays of Molière and de Regnard, but also in those of Marivaux. On her retirement from the stage in 1866, she made an unhappy marriage with Edmond David de Gheest (died 1885), secretary to the Belgian legation in Paris.
