= Augustine Susanne Brohan =

French actress

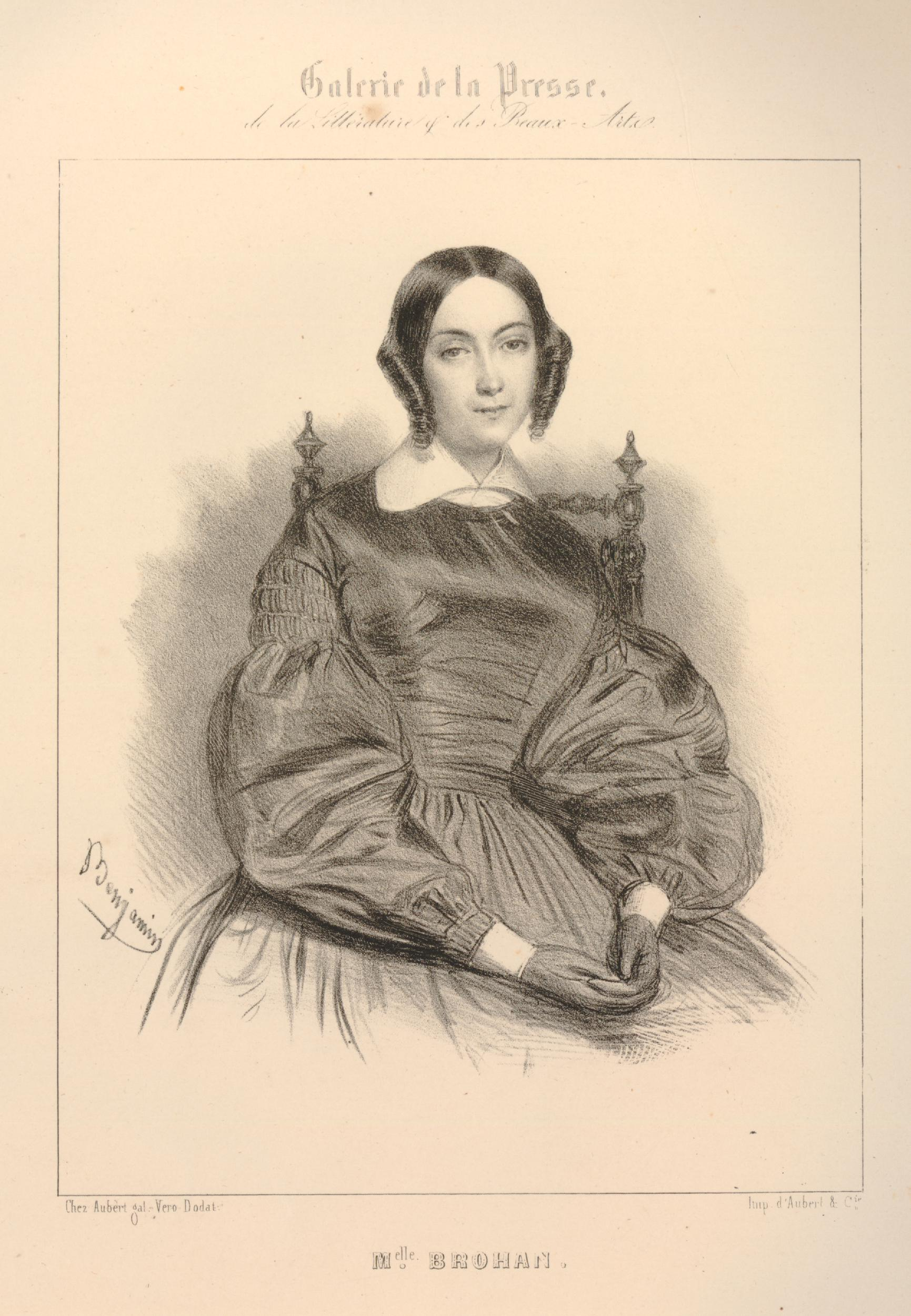

Augustine Susanne Brohan (22 January 1807 – 16 August 1887) was a French actress.

== Life ==
She was born in Paris. She entered the Conservatoire at the age of eleven, and took the second prize for comedy in 1820, and the first in 1821. She served her apprenticeship in the provinces, making her first Paris appearance at the Odéon in 1832 as Dorine in Tartuffe.

Her success there and elsewhere brought her a summons to the Comédie-Française, where she made her début on 15 February 1834, as Madelon in Les Précieuses ridicules, and Suzanne in Le Mariage de Figaro. She retired in 1842.

== Family ==
Her daughters, Joséphine-Félicité-Augustine and Ethelie Madeleine, were both also actors.
