= Éthélie Brohan =

French actress (1833–1900)

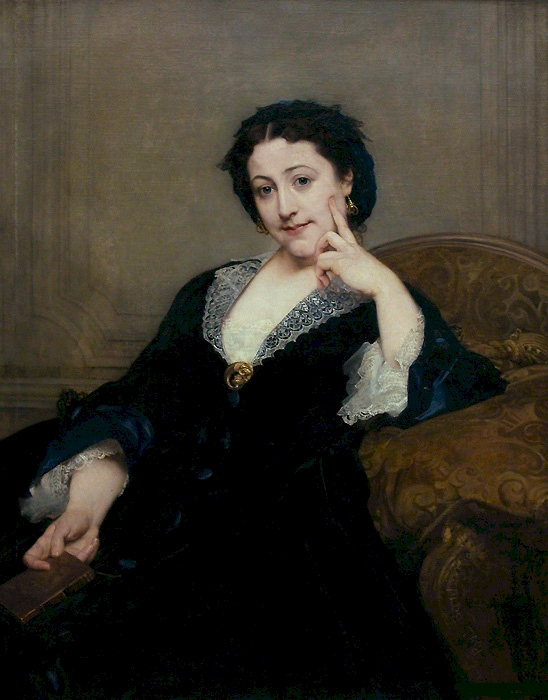
Madeleine Brohan. Portrait by Paul Baudry.

Éthélie Madeleine Brohan (1833–1900) was a French actress, also known as Madeleine Brohan. Her name has also been transcribed as Émelie-Madeleine Brohan.

The second daughter of the actress Augustine Susanne Brohan, like her sister, Joséphine, she also took first prize for comedy at the Conservatoire (1850).

She was engaged at once by the Comédie-Française, but instead of making her début in some play of the repertoire of the theatre, the management put on for her benefit a new comedy by Eugène Scribe and Ernest Legouvé, Les Contes de la reine de Navarre, in which she created the part of Marguerite on 1 September 1850.

Her talents and beauty made her a success from the first, and in less than two years from her début she was elected sociétaire. In 1853, she married Mario Uchard. from whom she was soon separated, and, in 1858, she returned to the Comédie Française in leading parts, until her retirement in 1886. Her name is associated with a great number of plays, besides those in the classical repertoire, notably Le Monde où l'on s'ennuie, Par droit de conquète, Les Deux Veuves, and Le Lion amoureux, in which, as the marquise de Maupas, she had one of her greatest successes.
