= List of compositions by Django Reinhardt =

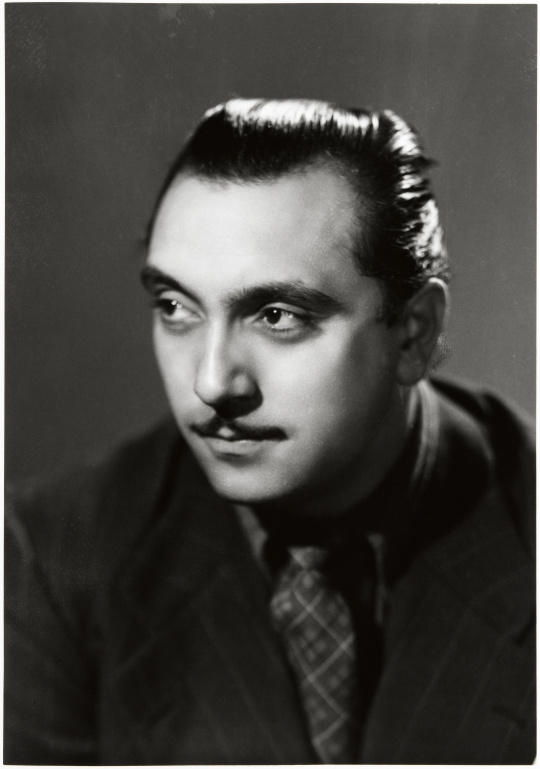
Django Reinhardt in 1944, photographed at Studio Harcourt

This is a list of compositions by Django Reinhardt, the Belgian-born Romani-French jazz guitarist and composer. He was the first major jazz talent to emerge from Europe and remains the most significant.

== A-H ==
- Anouman
- Appel Indirect
- Are you in the Mood (with Stéphane Grappelli)
- Artillerie Lourde
- Babik
- Belleville
- Black and White (with Stéphane Grappelli)
- Black Night
- Diminishing
- Diminishing Blackness
- Blues
- Blues Clair
- Blues d’Autrefois
- Blues en Mineur
- Blues for Barclay
- Blues for Ike
- Blues Riff
- Boléro
- Boogie Woogie
- Bricktop (with Stéphane Grappelli)
- Cavalerie (with Stéphane Grappelli)
- Chez Jacquet (never recorded by Django)
- Choti (never recorded by Django)
- Christmas Swing
- Crépuscule
- D.R.Blues
- Daphné
- Del Salle
- Deccaphonie
- Dinette
- Djalamichto (never recorded by Django)
- Djangology (with Stéphane Grappelli)
- Django Rag
- Django’s Blues
- Django’s Tiger (with Stéphane Grappelli)
- Double Whisky
- Douce Ambiance
- Duke and Dukie

" Echoes of Spain

- En Verdine (Never recorded by Django)
- Fantaisie (from Danse Norvegienne by Grieg)
- Fat
- Féerie
- Festival 48
- Fiddle Blues
- Fleche d’Or
- Fleur d’Ennui
- Folie à Amphion
- Gagoug (never recorded by Django)
- Gaiement
- Gin Gin
- Gypsy with a Song Pt1 & Pt2
- HCQ Strut (with Stéphane Grappelli)
- Hungaria (melody may be from a traditional pop song)

== I-P ==
- Impromptu
- Improvisation #1
- Improvisation #2
- Improvisation #3
- Improvisation #4
- Improvisation #5
- Improvisation #6
- Incidental Music for Racine's Andromaque
- Just For Fun
- Lentement Madamoiselle (March, 1942)
- Mabel
- Mano
- Manoir de mes rêves
- Django's Castle
- Castle of My Dreams
- Mélodie au crépuscule (Always credited to Django Reinhardt but written by Joseph Reinhardt - as per Michael Dregni/Francis-Alfred Moerman/Matelo Ferret)
- Love's melody
- Messe des Saintes-Maries-de-la-Mer (never recorded by Django)
- Micro
- Mike
- Swing Dynamique
- Minor Blues
- Minor Swing (with Stéphane Grappelli)
- Moppin' The Bride (with Stéphane Grappelli)
- Danse nuptiale
- No Name Blues
- Montagne Sainte-Genevieve (never recorded by Django)
- My Serenade
- Mystery Pacific
- Naguine
- Nocturne (with Stéphane Grappelli)
- Nuages
- Nuits de Saint-Germain-des-Prés
- Nymphéas
- Oiseaux des iles
- Oriental Shuffle (with Stéphane Grappelli)
- Oubli
- Paramount Stomp
- Parfum
- Pêche à la Mouche
- Place de Brouckère
- Porto Cabello
- Pour que Ma Vie Demeure

== Q-Z ==
- R. vingt-six (the last of those pieces co-authored by Stéphane Grappelli)
- Rhythme Futur
- Souvenirs (with Stéphane Grappelli)
- Spivy (with Stéphane Grappelli)
- Speevy
- Stephen's Blues
- Stockholm
- Stompin’ at Decca (with Stéphane Grappelli)
- Sweet Chorus
- Swing 39 (with Stéphane Grappelli)
- Swing 41
- Swing 42
- Swing 48
- Swing de Paris (with Stéphane Grappelli)
- Swing From Paris
- Swing Guitars (with Stéphane Grappelli)
- Swinging With Django
- Swingtime in Springtime
- Tears (with Stéphane Grappelli) - Based on a Gypsy lullaby “Muri wachsella an u sennelo weesch” recorded on April 3, 1937. Dregni (2008) p. 64.
- Testament (never recorded by Django)
- This Kind of Friend
- Troublant Boléro
- Twelfth Year
- Two Improvised Guitar Choruses
- Ultrafox (with Stéphane Grappelli) (April, 1935)
- Vamp
- Vendredi 13
- Vette
- Webster

== Waltzes ==
Django’s waltzes: Montagne Sainte-Genevieve, Gagoug, Chez Jazquet, and Choti were recorded by Pierre (Jean) "Matelo" Ferret in Paris, 1960. Djalamichto and En verdine were recorded by Ferret in 1961.

Matelo Ferret (g) acc by (b) and (d) - Paris, 1960 - Vogue (F)EPL7740 Chez Jacquet, Montagne Sainte Genevieve, Gagoug, Choti

Matelo Ferret Plays Unissued Django Numbers : Jean "Matlo" Ferret (g) solo acc by unknown other (g's), (b) and (d) - Paris, 1961 - Vogue (F)EPL7829 En verdine, Djalmichito

NOTE: Chpile t'chavo and Tchoucar wago were composed by Matelo Ferret.

There exists a brief recording of Django's "Messe" played on the Organ.

== Music for Racine's Andromaque ==
Antonietto, Alain, François Billiard, and François Billiard. Django Reinhardt : Rythmes Futurs. Paris: Fayard, 2004. Pages 344-345

Quite unaware of the dangers he faced as a Gypsy, during the German occupation, Django agreed to compose incidental music for a "modern" version of Andromaque by Racine, which promised to be dangerously scandalous . Directed by Jean Marais, and with avant-garde staging and scenery, the play, opened in May 1944 at the Theatre Edouard VII.

Those involved in the production were provoked with physical threats by the Militia, and the vengeance of the collaborationist press. André Castelot in the publication, La Gerbe - June 1, 1944 - even attacked the music of Django ... advising him to "go green" (camouflage) while traveling around France - whether with his quintet, or when in the company of his memorable nomadic "cousins".

Django went to the Riviera, especially Toulon, where in August 1944, he joined an orchestra of American G.I.s which had just arrived.

_______________________

Ideology, Cultural Politics and Literary Collaboration at la Gerbe by Richard J. Golsan

Of the major weekly reviews published in Paris during the Occupation, perhaps none is more representative of the period itself and the spirit of collaboration with Nazi Germany than La Gerbe. Created 'out of whole cloth' by the German Embassy to serve its political and cultural objectives,[2] la Gerbe began publication in July 1940 and ceased publication in August 1944.

Two hundred and fourteen issues of the journal appeared in all. A large-scale poster campaign in the streets of Paris preceded the appearance of the first number of La Gerbe on 11 July 1940,[3] and the offices of the journal on the Rue des Pyramides were ransacked following the Liberation.
