= DjangoFest =

Music festivals

DjangoFest is a series of music festivals celebrating the music of Django Reinhardt and other forms of Gypsy jazz and traditional Romani music. There are three annual festivals: DjangoFestNW, a 5-day festival produced by Whidbey Island Center for the Arts; DjangoFest San Francisco, a three-day festival held at the Throckmorton Theater in Mill Valley, California; DjangoFest Los Angeles, a one-day festival held in Laguna Beach; and DjangoFest Colorado, held in Mt. Crested Butte.

This blend of Eastern European melodies, Parisian Bal-musette, Spanish Flamenco, and American Swing music was created by Reinhardt and fellow Romani musicians in the cafes of Paris during the 1930s and 1940s.

There are related festivals in other parts of the world such as Festival Django Reinhardt in Samois-sur-Seine, France and another in Hildesheim, Germany.
