= Django Reinhardt =

French jazz musician (1910–1953)

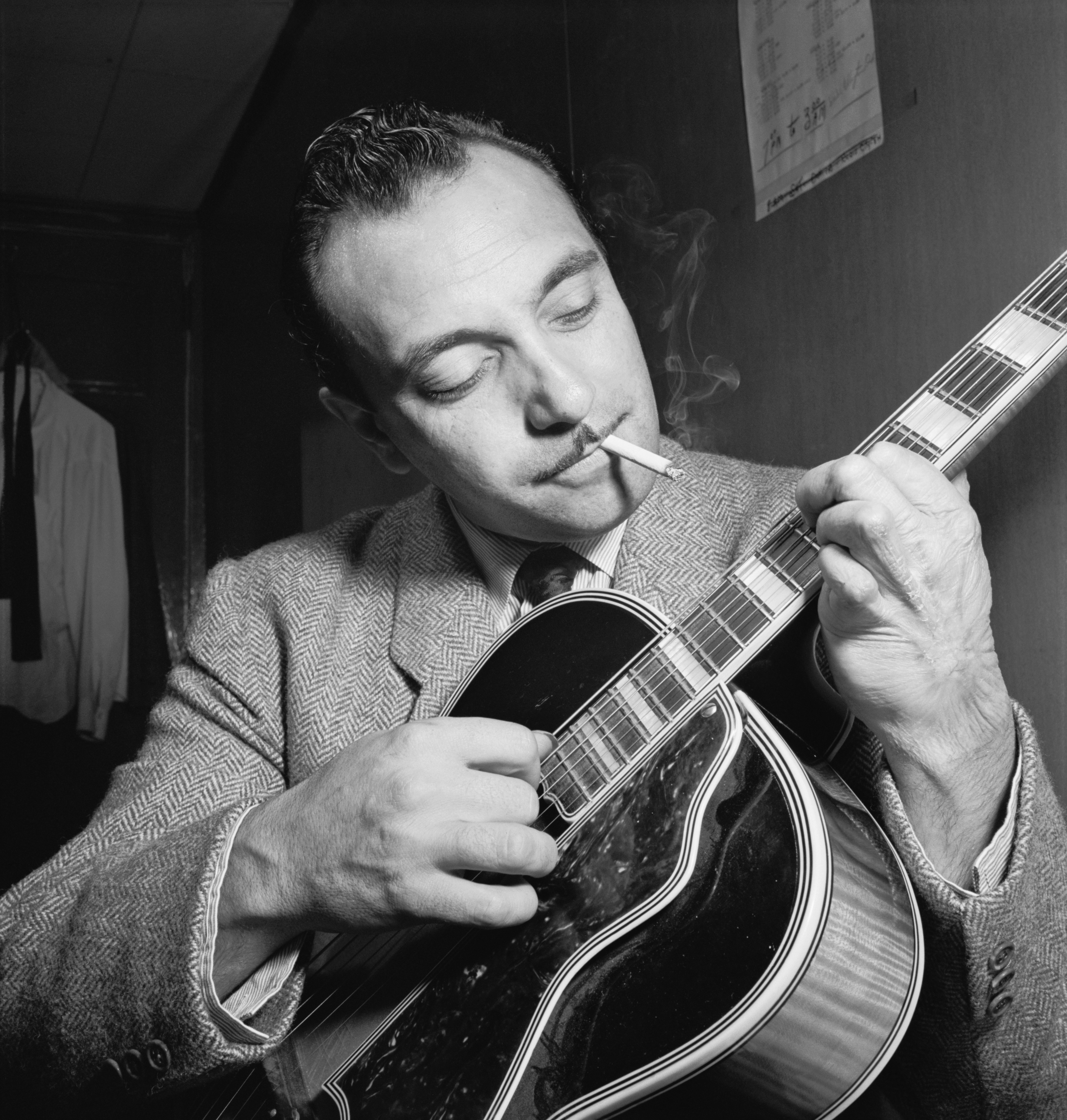
- Reinhardt in 1946
- Born: Jean Reinhardt; 23 January 1910; Liberchies, Pont-à-Celles, Belgium
- Died: 16 May 1953 (aged 43); Fontainebleau, France
- Spouse(s): Florine Mayer (m. 1927) Sophie Ziegler (m. 1943)
- Relatives: Joseph Reinhardt (brother); Lousson Reinhardt (son); Babik Reinhardt (son)
- Musical career
- Genres: Jazz; gypsy jazz; bebop; Romani music
- Occupations: Guitarist; composer
- Instruments: Guitar; violin; banjo
- Years active: 1928–1953
- Formerly of: Stéphane Grappelli, Quintette du Hot Club de France

Jean Reinhardt (23 January 1910 – 16 May 1953), known by his Romani nickname Django (French: [dʒãŋɡo ʁɛjnaʁt] or [dʒɑ̃ɡo ʁenɑʁt]), was a Belgian jazz guitarist and composer. He was one of the first major jazz talents to emerge in Europe and has been hailed as one of its most significant exponents.

With violinist Stéphane Grappelli, Reinhardt formed the Paris-based Quintette du Hot Club de France in 1934. The group was among the first to play jazz that featured the guitar as a lead instrument. Reinhardt recorded in France with many visiting American musicians, including Coleman Hawkins and Benny Carter, and briefly toured the United States with Duke Ellington's orchestra in 1946. He died suddenly of a brain hemorrhage in 1953 at the age of 43.

Reinhardt's most popular compositions have become standards within gypsy jazz, including "Minor Swing", "Daphne", "Belleville", "Djangology", "Swing '42", and "Nuages". The jazz guitarist Frank Vignola said that nearly every major popular music guitarist in the world has been influenced by Reinhardt. Over the last few decades, annual Django festivals have been held throughout Europe and the U.S., and a biography has been written about his life. In February 2017, the Berlin International Film Festival held the world premiere of the French biographical film Django, based on Reinhardt's life.

== Biography ==
=== Early life ===
Reinhardt was born on 23 January 1910 in Liberchies, Pont-à-Celles, Belgium, into a French family of Manouche Romani descent. His French, Alsatian father, Jean Eugène Weiss, domiciled in Paris with his wife, went by Jean-Baptiste Reinhardt, his wife's surname, to avoid French military conscription. His mother, Laurence Reinhardt, was a dancer. The birth certificate refers to "Jean Reinhart, son of Jean Baptiste Reinhart, artist, and Laurence Reinhart, housewife, domiciled in Paris".

A number of authors have repeated the suggestion that Reinhardt's nickname, Django, is Romani for "I awake"; it may also simply have been a diminutive or local Walloon version of "Jean". Reinhardt spent most of his youth in Romani encampments close to Paris, where he started playing the violin, banjo and guitar. He became adept at stealing chickens. His father reportedly played music in a family band comprising himself and seven brothers; a surviving photograph shows this band including his father on piano.

Reinhardt was attracted to music at an early age, first playing the violin. At the age of 12, he received a banjo-guitar as a gift. He quickly taught himself to play, mimicking the fingerings of musicians he watched, who would have included local virtuoso players of the day such as Jean "Poulette" Castro and Auguste "Gusti" Malha, as well as from his uncle Guiligou, who played violin, banjo and guitar. Reinhardt was able to make a living playing music by the time he was 15, busking in cafés, often with his brother Joseph. At this time, he had not started playing jazz, although he had probably heard and been intrigued by the version of jazz played by American expatriate bands like Billy Arnold's.

Reinhardt received little formal education and acquired the rudiments of literacy only in adult life.

=== Marriage and injury ===
At the age of 17, Reinhardt married Florine "Bella" Mayer, a girl from the same Romani settlement, according to Romani custom (although not an official marriage under French law). The following year he recorded for the first time. On these recordings, made in 1928, Reinhardt plays the "banjo" (actually the banjo-guitar) accompanying the accordionists Maurice Alexander, Jean Vaissade and Victor Marceau, and the singer Maurice Chaumel. His name was now drawing international attention, such as from British bandleader Jack Hylton, who came to France just to hear him play. Hylton offered him a job on the spot, and Reinhardt accepted.

Before he had a chance to start with the band, Reinhardt nearly died. On the night of 2 November 1928, Reinhardt was going to bed in the wagon that he and his wife shared in the caravan. He knocked over a candle, which ignited the extremely flammable celluloid that his wife used to make artificial flowers. The wagon was quickly engulfed in flames. The couple escaped, but Reinhardt suffered extensive burns over half his body. During his 18-month hospitalization, doctors recommended amputation of his badly damaged right leg. Reinhardt refused the surgery and was eventually able to walk with the aid of a cane.

More crucial to his music, the third and fourth fingers (ring and little fingers) of Reinhardt's left hand were badly burned. Doctors believed that he would never play guitar again. During many months of recuperation, Reinhardt retaught himself to play using primarily the index and middle fingers of his left hand, using the two injured fingers only for chord work. He made use of a new six-string steel-strung acoustic guitar that was bought for him by his brother, Joseph Reinhardt, who was also an accomplished guitarist.

Within a year of the fire, in 1929, Bella Mayer gave birth to their son, Henri "Lousson" Reinhardt. Soon thereafter, the couple split up. The son eventually took the surname of his mother's new husband. As Lousson Baumgartner, the son himself became an accomplished musician who went on to record with his biological father.

=== Discovery of jazz ===
After parting from his wife and son, Reinhardt traveled throughout France, getting occasional jobs playing music at small clubs. He had no specific goals, living a hand-to-mouth existence, spending his earnings as quickly as he made them. Accompanying him on his travels was his new girlfriend, Sophie Ziegler. Nicknamed "Naguine", she was a distant cousin.

In the years after the fire, Reinhardt was rehabilitating and experimenting on the guitar that his brother had given him. After having played a broad spectrum of music, he was introduced to American jazz by an acquaintance, Émile Savitry, whose record collection included such musical luminaries as Louis Armstrong, Duke Ellington, Joe Venuti, Eddie Lang, and Lonnie Johnson. (The swinging sound of Venuti's jazz violin and Eddie Lang's virtuoso guitar-playing anticipated the more famous sound of Reinhardt and Grappelli's later ensemble.) Hearing their music triggered in Reinhardt a vision and goal of becoming a jazz professional.

While developing his interest in jazz, in 1931 Reinhardt met Stéphane Grappelli, a young violinist with similar musical interests. In 1928, Grappelli had been a member of the orchestra at the Ambassador Hotel while bandleader Paul Whiteman and Joe Venuti were performing there. In the summer of 1934 they met again while both were engaged as members of a band led by bassist Louis Vola playing at the Hôtel Claridge on the Champs-Élysées in Paris, and began a musical partnership. Pierre Nourry, the secretary of the Hot Club de France, invited Reinhardt and Grappelli to form the Quintette du Hot Club de France, with Louis Vola on bass and Joseph Reinhardt and Roger Chaput on guitar.

=== Formation of the quintet ===
From 1934 until the outbreak of World War II in 1939, Reinhardt and Grappelli worked together as the principal soloists of their newly formed quintet, the Quintette du Hot Club de France, in Paris. It became the most accomplished and innovative European jazz group of the period.

Reinhardt's brother Joseph and Roger Chaput also played on guitar, and Louis Vola was on bass. The Quintette was one of the few well-known jazz ensembles composed only of stringed instruments.

In Paris on 14 March 1933, Reinhardt recorded two takes each of "Parce que je vous aime" and "Si, j'aime Suzy", vocal numbers with lots of guitar fills and guitar support. He used three guitarists along with an accordion lead, violin, and bass. In August 1934, he made other recordings with more than one guitar (Joseph Reinhardt, Roger Chaput, and Reinhardt), including the first recording by the Quintette. In both years the great majority of their recordings featured a wide variety of horns, often in multiples, piano, and other instruments, but the all-string instrumentation is the one most often adopted by emulators of the Hot Club sound.

Decca Records in the United States released three records of Quintette tunes with Reinhardt on guitar, and one other, credited to "Stephane Grappelli & His Hot 4 with Django Reinhardt", in 1935.

Reinhardt also played and recorded with many American jazz musicians, such as Adelaide Hall, Coleman Hawkins, Benny Carter, and Rex Stewart (who later stayed in Paris). He participated in a jam session and radio performance with Louis Armstrong. Later in his career, Reinhardt played with Dizzy Gillespie in France. Also in the neighborhood was the artistic salon R-26, at which Reinhardt and Grappelli performed regularly as they developed their unique musical style.

In 1938, Reinhardt's quintet played to thousands at an all-star show held in London's Kilburn State auditorium. While playing, he noticed American film actor Eddie Cantor in the front row. When their set ended, Cantor rose to his feet, then went up on stage and kissed Reinhardt's hand, paying no concern to the audience. A few weeks later the quintet played at the London Palladium.

=== Second World War ===
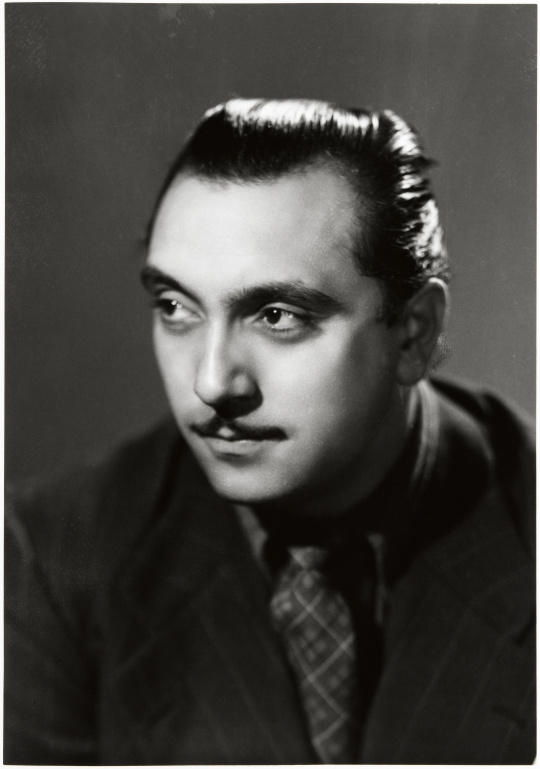
Reinhardt in 1944, photographed at Studio Harcourt

When World War II broke out, the original quintet was on tour in the United Kingdom. Reinhardt returned to Paris at once, leaving his then girlfriend in the UK. Grappelli remained in the United Kingdom for the duration of the war. Reinhardt re-formed the quintet, with Hubert Rostaing on clarinet replacing Grappelli.

While he tried to continue with his music, war with the Nazis presented Reinhardt with a potentially catastrophic obstacle, as he was a Romani jazz musician. Beginning in 1933, all German Romani were barred from living in cities, herded into settlement camps, and routinely sterilized. Romani men were required to wear a brown Gypsy ID triangle sewn at chest level on their clothing, similar to the pink triangle that homosexuals wore, and much like the yellow Star of David that Jews had to subsequently wear. During the war, Romani were systematically killed in concentration camps. In France, they were used as slave labour on farms and in factories. During the Holocaust an estimated 600,000 to 1.5 million Romani throughout Europe were killed.

Hitler and Joseph Goebbels viewed jazz as un-German counterculture. Nonetheless, Goebbels stopped short of a complete ban on jazz, which now had many fans in Germany and elsewhere. Official policy towards jazz was much less strict in occupied France, according to author Andy Fry, with jazz music frequently played on both Radio France, the official station of Vichy France, and Radio Paris, which was controlled by the Germans. A new generation of French jazz enthusiasts, the Zazous, had arisen and swollen the ranks of the Hot Club. In addition to the increased interest, many American musicians based in Paris during the thirties had returned to the US at the beginning of the war, leaving more work for French musicians. Reinhardt was the most famous jazz musician in Europe at the time, working steadily during the early war years and earning a great deal of money, yet always under threat.

Reinhardt expanded his musical horizons during this period. Using an early amplification system, he was able to work in more of a big-band format, in large ensembles with horn sections. He also experimented with classical composition, writing a Mass for the Gypsies and a symphony. Since he did not read music, Reinhardt worked with an assistant to notate what he was improvising. His modernist piece "Rythme Futur" was also intended to be acceptable to the Nazis.

In this ["Nuages"] graceful and eloquent melody, Django evoked the woes of the war that weighed on people's souls—and then transcended it all.

— Biographer Michael Dregni

In 1943, Reinhardt married his long-term partner Sophie "Naguine" Ziegler in Salbris. They had a son, Babik Reinhardt, who became a respected guitarist.

At that time the tide of war turned against the Germans, with a considerable darkening of the situation in Paris. Severe rationing was in place, and members of Reinhardt's circle were being captured by the Nazis or joining the resistance.

Reinhardt's first attempt at escape from Occupied France led to capture. Fortunately for him, a jazz-loving German, Luftwaffe officer Dietrich Schulz-Köhn, allowed him to return to Paris. Reinhardt made a second attempt a few days later, but was stopped in the middle of the night by Swiss border guards, who forced him to return to Paris again.

One of his tunes, 1940's "Nuages", became an unofficial anthem in Paris to signify hope for liberation. During a concert at the Salle Pleyel, the popularity of the tune was such that the crowd made him replay it three times in a row. The single sold over 100,000 copies.

=== United States tour ===
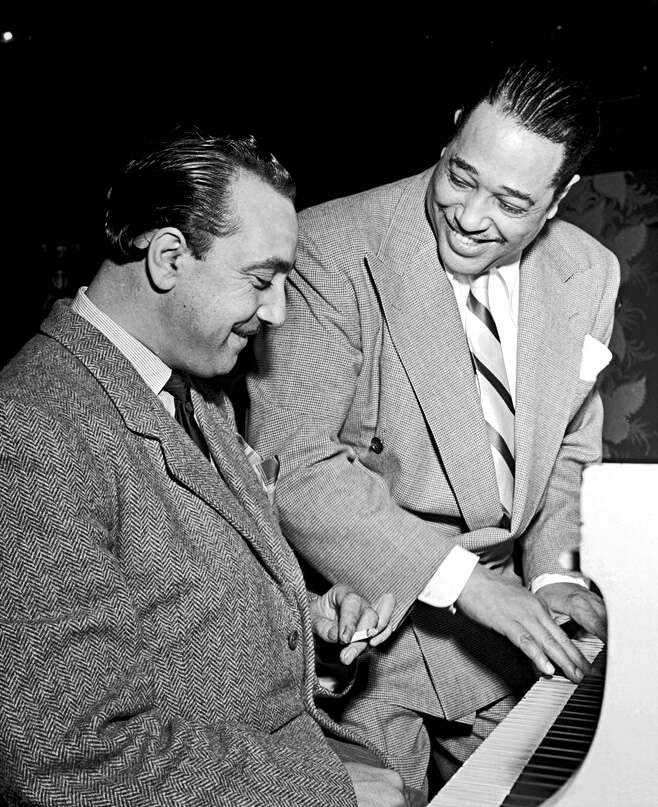
Reinhardt and Duke Ellington at the Aquarium in New York, c. November 1946

After the war, Reinhardt rejoined Grappelli in the UK. In the autumn of 1946, he made his first tour in the United States, debuting at Cleveland Music Hall as a special guest soloist with Duke Ellington and His Orchestra. He played with many musicians and composers, such as Maury Deutsch. At the end of the tour, Reinhardt played two nights at Carnegie Hall in New York City; he received a great ovation and took six curtain calls on the first night.

Despite his pride in touring with Ellington (one of two letters to Grappelli relates his excitement), he was not fully integrated into the band. He played a few tunes at the end of the show, backed by Ellington, with no special arrangements written for him. After the tour, Reinhardt secured an engagement at Café Society Uptown, where he played four solos a day, backed by the resident band. These performances drew large audiences. Having failed to bring his usual Selmer Modèle Jazz, he played on a borrowed electric guitar, which he felt hampered the delicacy of his style. He had been promised jobs in California, but they failed to develop. Tired of waiting, Reinhardt returned to France in February 1947.

=== After the quintet ===
After his return, Reinhardt appeared to find it difficult to adjust. He sometimes showed up for scheduled concerts without a guitar or amplifier, or wandered off to the park or beach. On a few occasions he refused to get out of bed. Reinhardt developed a reputation among his band, fans, and managers as extremely unreliable. He skipped sold-out concerts to "walk to the beach" or "smell the dew." During this period he continued to attend the R-26 artistic salon in Montmartre, improvising with his devoted collaborator, Stéphane Grappelli.

In Rome in 1949, Reinhardt recruited three Italian jazz players (on bass, piano, and snare drum) and recorded over 60 tunes in an Italian studio. He united with Grappelli, and used his acoustic Selmer-Maccaferri. The recording was issued for the first time in the late 1950s.

Back in Paris, in June 1950, Reinhardt was invited to join an entourage to welcome the return of Benny Goodman. He also attended a reception for Goodman, who, after the war ended, had asked Reinhardt to join him in the US. Goodman repeated his invitation and, out of politeness, Reinhardt accepted. Reinhardt later had second thoughts about what role he could play alongside Goodman, who was the "King of Swing", and remained in France.

=== Final years ===
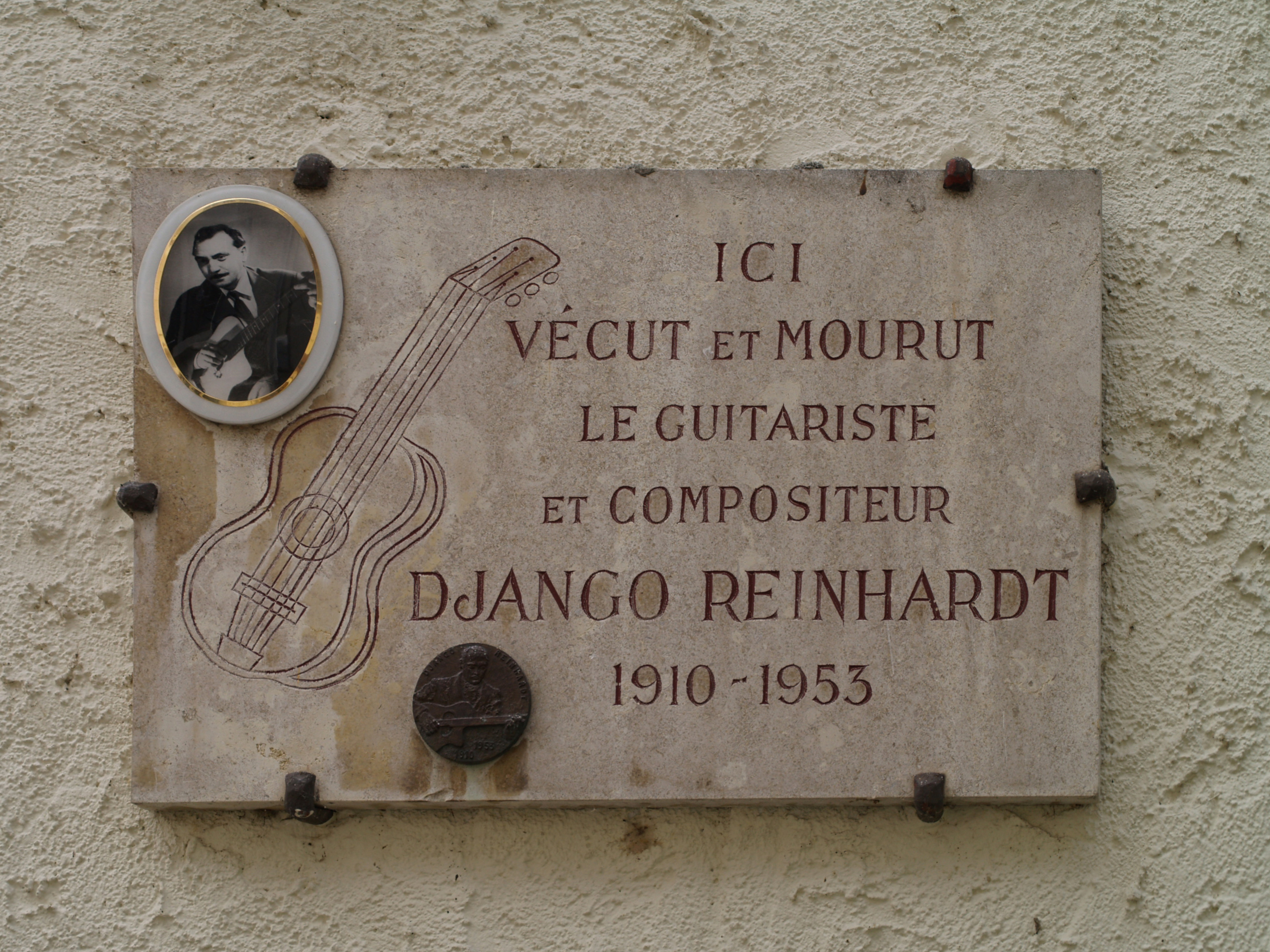
Plaque commemorating Reinhardt at Samois-sur-Seine

In 1951, Reinhardt retired to Samois-sur-Seine, near Fontainebleau, where he lived until his death. He continued to play in Paris jazz clubs and began playing electric guitar. (He often used a Selmer fitted with an electric pickup, despite his initial hesitation about the instrument.) In his final recordings, made with his Nouvelle Quintette in the last few months of his life, he had begun moving in a new musical direction, in which he assimilated the vocabulary of bebop and fused it with his own melodic style.

On 16 May 1953, while walking home from Fontainebleau–Avon station after playing in a Paris club, he collapsed outside his house from a brain hemorrhage. It was a Saturday, and it took a full day for a doctor to arrive. Reinhardt was declared dead on arrival at the hospital in Fontainebleau, at the age of 43.

== Technique and musical approach ==
Reinhardt developed his initial musical approach via tutoring by relatives and exposure to other gypsy guitar players of the day, then playing the banjo-guitar alongside accordionists in the world of the Paris bal musette. He played mainly with a plectrum for maximum volume and attack (particularly in the 1920s and early 1930s when amplification in venues was minimal or non-existent), although he could also play fingerstyle on occasion, as evidenced by some recorded introductions and solos. Following his accident in 1928 in which his left hand was severely burned, he was left with the use of only his first two fingers. As a result, he developed a completely new left hand technique and started performing on guitar accompanying popular singers of the day, before discovering jazz and presenting his new hybrid style of gypsy approach plus jazz to the outside world via the Quintette du Hot Club de France.

Despite his left hand handicap, Reinhardt was able to recapture (in modified form) and then surpass his previous level of proficiency on the guitar (by now his main instrument), not only as a lead instrumental voice but also as a driving and harmonically interesting rhythm player; his virtuosity, incorporating many gypsy-derived influences, was also matched with a superb sense of melodic invention as well as general musicality in terms of choice of notes, timing, dynamics, and utilizing the maximum tonal range from an instrument previously thought of by many critics as potentially limited in expression. Playing completely by ear (he could neither read nor write music), he roamed freely across the full range of the fretboard giving full flight to his musical imagination and could play with ease in any key. Guitarists, particularly in Britain and the United States, could scarcely believe what they heard on the records that the Quintette was making; guitarist, gypsy jazz enthusiast and educator Ian Cruickshank writes:

It wasn't until 1938, and the Quintet's first tour of England, that guitarists [in the U.K.] were able to witness Django's amazing abilities. His hugely innovative technique included, on a grand scale, such unheard of devices as melodies played in octaves, tremolo chords with shifting notes that sounded like whole horn sections, a complete array of natural and artificial harmonics, highly charged dissonances, super-fast chromatic runs from the open bass strings to the highest notes on the 1st string, an unbelievably flexible and driving right-hand, two and three octave arpeggios, advanced and unconventional chords and a use of the flattened fifth that predated be-bop by a decade. Add to all this Django's staggering harmonic and melodic concept, huge sound, pulsating swing, sense of humour and sheer speed of execution, and it is little wonder that guitar players were knocked sideways upon their first encounter with this full-blown genius.

Because of his damaged left hand (his ring and little fingers helped little in his playing) Reinhardt had to modify both his chordal and melodic approach extensively. For chords he developed a novel system based largely around 3-note chords, each of which could serve as the equivalent of several conventional chords in different inversions; for the treble notes he could employ his ring and little fingers to fret the relevant high strings even though he could not articulate these fingers independently, while in some chords he also employed his left hand thumb on the lowest string. Within his rapid melodic runs he frequently incorporated arpeggios, which could be played using two notes per string (played with his two "good" fingers, being his index and middle fingers) while shifting up or down the fingerboard, as opposed to the more conventional "box" approach of moving across strings within a single fretboard position (location). He also produced some of his characteristic "effects" by moving a fixed shape (such as a diminished chord) rapidly up and down the fretboard, resulting in what one writer has called "intervallic cycling of melodic motifs and chords". For an unsurpassed insight into these techniques in use, interested persons should not miss viewing the only known synchronised (sound and vision) footage of Reinhardt in performance, playing on an instrumental version of the song "J'Attendrai" for the short jazz film Le Jazz Hot in 1938–39 (copies available on YouTube and elsewhere).

Hugues Panassié, in his 1942 book The Real Jazz, wrote:

First of all, his instrumental technique is vastly superior to that of all other jazz guitarists. This technique permits him to play with an inconceivable velocity and makes his instrument completely versatile. Though his virtuosity is stupefying, it is no less so than his creative invention. In his solos [...] his melodic ideas are sparkling and ravishing, and their abundance scarcely gives the listener time to catch his breath. Django's ability to bend his guitar to the most fantastic audacities, combined with his expressive inflections and vibrato, is no less wonderful; one feels an extraordinary flame burning through every note.

Writing in 1945, Billy Neil and E. Gates stated that

Reinhardt set new standards by an almost incredible and hitherto unthought-of technique ... His ideas have a freshness and spontaneity that are at once fascinating and alluring ... [Nevertheless] The characteristics of Reinhardt's music are primarily emotional. His relative association of experience, reinforced by a profound rational knowledge of his instrument; the guitar's possibilities and limitations; his love for music and the expression of it—all are a necessary adjunct to the means of expressing these emotions.

Django-style enthusiast John Jorgenson has been quoted as saying:

Django's guitar playing always has so much personality in it, and seems to contain such joy and feeling that it is infectious. He also pushes himself to the edge nearly all the time, and rides a wave of inspiration that sometimes gets dangerous. Even the few times he does not quite make his ideas flow out flawlessly it is still so exciting that mistakes don't matter! Django's seemingly never-ending bag of licks, tricks and colors always keep the song interesting, and his intensity level is rarely met by any guitarist. Django's technique was not only phenomenal, but it was personal and unique to him due to his handicap. It is very difficult to achieve the same tone, articulation and clarity using all 5 left hand fingers. It is possible to get closer with only 2 fingers, but again is quite challenging. Probably the thing about this music that makes it always challenging and exciting to play is that Django raised the bar so high, that it is like chasing genius to get close to his level of playing.

In his later style (c. 1946 onwards) Reinhardt began to incorporate more bebop influences in his compositions and improvisations, also fitting a Stimer electric pickup to his acoustic guitar. With the addition of amplification, his playing became more linear and "horn like", with the greater facility of the amplified instrument for longer sustain and to be heard in quiet passages, and in general less reliance on his gypsy "bag of tricks" as developed for his acoustic guitar style (also, in some of his late recordings, with a very different supporting group context from his "classic", pre-war Quintette sound). These "electric period" Reinhardt recordings have in general received less popular re-release and critical analysis than his pre-war releases (the latter also extending to the period from 1940 to 1945 when Grappelli was absent, which included some of his most famous compositions such as "Nuages"), but are also a fascinating area of Reinhardt's work to study, and have begun to be revived by players such as the Rosenberg Trio (with their 2010 release "Djangologists") and Biréli Lagrène. Wayne Jefferies, in his article "Django's Forgotten Era", writes:

Early in 1951, armed with his amplified Maccaferri – which he used to the very end – he put together a new band of the best young modern musicians in Paris; including Hubert Fol, an altoist in the Charlie Parker mould. Although Django was twenty years older than the rest of the band, he was completely in command of the modern style. Whilst his solos became less chordal and his lines more Christian-like, he retained his originality. I believe he should be rated much more highly as a be-bop guitarist. His infallible technique, his daring, 'on the edge' improvisations coupled with his vastly advanced harmonic sense, took him to musical heights that Christian and many other Bop musicians never came near. The live cuts from Club St. Germain in February 1951 are a revelation. Django is on top form; full of new ideas that are executed with amazing fluidity, cutting angular lines that always retain that ferocious swing.

== Family ==
Reinhardt's first son, Lousson (a.k.a. Henri Baumgartner), played jazz in a mostly bebop style in the 1950s and 1960s. He followed the Romani lifestyle and was relatively little recorded. Reinhardt's second son, Babik, became a guitarist in a more contemporary jazz style, and recorded a number of albums before his death in 2001. After Reinhardt died, his younger brother Joseph at first swore to abandon music, but he was persuaded to perform and record again. Joseph's son Markus Reinhardt is a violinist in the Romani style.

A third generation of direct descendants has developed as musicians: David Reinhardt, Reinhardt's grandson (by his son Babik), leads his own trio. Dallas Baumgartner, a great-grandson by Lousson, is a guitarist who travels with the Romani and keeps a low public profile. A distant relative, violinist Schnuckenack Reinhardt, became known in Germany as a performer of gypsy music and gypsy jazz up to his death in 2006, and assisted in keeping Reinhardt's legacy alive through the period following Django's death.

== Legacy ==
We all know the Django story, but the actual recorded evidence is something else altogether. The hot jazz genius was a formidable speedster, yes, but his playing was also full of life and love, a romanticism that belongs to another century. Django is revered as much for his feel, his tone, and his heart as he is for his technical prowess. A master of his art whose influence is felt far and wide, Django is proof that talent will always find a way to turn a setback into an advantage.

— Rob Power of MusicRadar (June 16, 2017)

Reinhardt is regarded as one of the greatest guitar players of all time, and the first important European jazz musician to make a major contribution with jazz guitar. (Note: Professor of music and guitarist, Mark White, of Berklee College, writes: "Django Reinhardt with his Hot Club of France group was a hotbed of great guitar playing. Eventually, Django would play electric guitar, and become one of the greatest guitar stylists of all time.") During his career he wrote nearly 100 songs, according to jazz guitarist Frank Vignola.

Using a Selmer guitar in the mid-1930s, his style took on new volume and expressiveness. Because of his physical disability, he played mainly using his index and middle fingers, and invented a distinctive style of jazz guitar.

For about a decade after Reinhardt's death, interest in his musical style was minimal. In the fifties, bebop superseded swing in jazz, rock and roll took off, and electric instruments became dominant in popular music. Since the mid-sixties, there has been a revival of interest in Reinhardt's music, a revival that has extended into the 21st century, with annual festivals and periodic tribute concerts. His devotees included classical guitarist Julian Bream and country guitarist Chet Atkins, who considered him one of the ten greatest guitarists of the twentieth century. (Note: Jimmy Page said "Django Reinhardt was fantastic. He must have been playing all the time to be that good.")

Jazz guitarists in the U.S., such as Charlie Byrd and Wes Montgomery, were influenced by his style. Byrd, who lived from 1925 to 1999, said that Reinhardt was his primary influence. The rock musician Mike Peters noted that "the word 'genius' is bantered about too much. But in jazz, Louis Armstrong was a genius, Duke Ellington was another one, and Reinhardt was also." David Grisman added, "As far as I'm concerned, no one since has come anywhere close to Django Reinhardt as an improviser or technician."

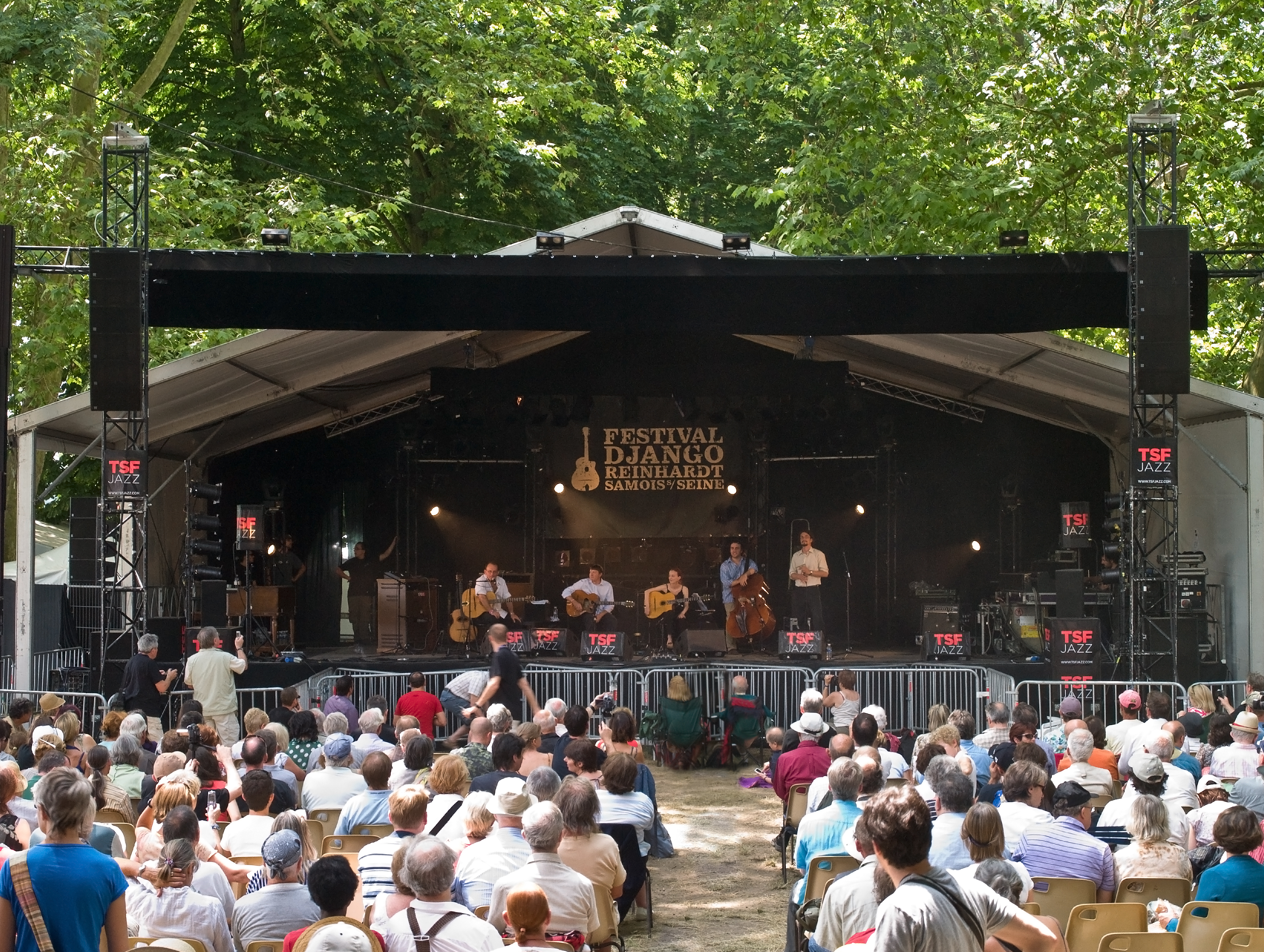
Festival Django Reinhardt in France

The popularity of gypsy jazz has generated an increasing number of festivals, such as the Festival Django Reinhardt held every last weekend of June since 1983 in Samois-sur-Seine, and since 2017 in nearby Fontainebleau; the various DjangoFests held throughout Europe and the US; and "Django in June", an annual camp for Gypsy jazz musicians and aficionados held at Smith College in Massachusetts.

== Influence ==
The instant I heard Django, I flipped. I chose his style because it spoke to me. He was too far ahead of his time. He was something else.

— French recording artist, Serge Krief

Many guitar players and other musicians have expressed admiration for Reinhardt or have cited him as a major influence. Jeff Beck described Reinhardt as "by far the most astonishing guitar player ever" and "quite superhuman". Jimmy Page of Led Zeppelin said, "Django Reinhardt was fantastic. He must have been playing all the time to be that good." Andrew Latimer of the progressive rock band Camel said that he was influenced by Reinhardt. Denny Laine and Jimmy McCulloch, members of Paul McCartney's band Wings, mentioned him as an inspiration. Asked to name his ten greatest influences, Chet Atkins named Reinhardt as his number one.

Grateful Dead's Jerry Garcia and Black Sabbath's Tony Iommi, both of whom lost fingers in accidents, were inspired by Reinhardt's example of becoming an accomplished guitar player despite his injuries. Garcia was quoted in June 1985 in Frets Magazine:

His technique is awesome! Even today, nobody has really come to the state that he was playing at. As good as players are, they haven't gotten to where he is. There's a lot of guys that play fast and a lot of guys that play clean, and the guitar has come a long way as far as speed and clarity go, but nobody plays with the whole fullness of expression that Django has. I mean, the combination of incredible speed – all the speed you could possibly want – but also the thing of every note have a specific personality. You don't hear it. I really haven't heard it anywhere but with Django.

Django is still one of my main influences, I think, for lyricism. He can make me cry when I hear him.

— Toots Thielemans

Willie Nelson is a lifelong Reinhardt fan, writing in his memoir, "This was a man who changed my musical life by giving me a whole new perspective on the guitar and, on an even more profound level, on my relationship with sound...During my formative years, as I listened to Django's records, especially songs like 'Nuages' that I would play for the rest of my life, I studied his technique. Even more, I studied his gentleness. I love the human sound he gave his acoustic guitar."

== Festivals named after Django Reinhardt ==
- In Reinhardt's birth village Liberchies, an annual jazz festival is held every May. A large memorial has also been erected there. Jazz festivals under the name Djangofollies have also been organized all over Belgium.
- In 1984 the Kool Jazz Festival, held in Carnegie Hall and Avery Fisher Hall, was dedicated entirely to Reinhardt. Performers included Grappelli, Benny Carter, and Mike Peters with his group of seven musicians. The festival was organized by George Wein.
- Ramelton, Co. Donegal, Ireland, each year hosts a festival in tribute to Django called "Django sur Lennon" or "Django on the Lennon" the Lennon being the name of the local river that runs through the village.

== Reinhardt in popular culture ==
=== Music ===
- Numerous musicians have written and recorded tributes to Reinhardt.
  - The jazz standard "Django" (1954) was composed by John Lewis of the Modern Jazz Quartet in honour of Reinhardt.
  - The Allman Brothers Band song "Jessica" was written by Dickey Betts in tribute to Reinhardt.
  - American country music artists Willie Nelson and Merle Haggard named their sixth and final collaborative studio album "Django and Jimmie". It was released on 2 June 2015, by Legacy Recordings. The album contains the song "Django and Jimmie" which is a tribute to musicians Django Reinhardt and Jimmie Rodgers.
  - In 1982's "Tanta til Beate" ("Beate's Aunt"), by the Norwegian singer-songwriter and folk musician Lillebjørn Nilsen, Reinhardt is hailed several times.
  - Electro swing band Swingrowers' 2014 track "Django" details a "musical bloodbath" in a rap battle and duel between Django Reinhardt and his fictional brother D'Angelo Reinhardt in which both brothers sever one another's heads.

=== Novels ===
- Reinhardt appears as a character in the fiction novel The Magic Strings of Frankie Presto (2015) by American author Mitch Albom.

=== Comics ===
- Joan Sfar wrote the script for the graphic novel Jeangot (Gallimard, 2012), drawn by Clément Oubrerier, which is a biopic about Django Reinhardt, set in an anthropomorphic animal universe.
- In coincidence with the 110th anniversary in 2020 of Django's birth, a graphic novel depicting his youth years was published under the title Django Main de Feu, by writer Salva Rubio and artist Efa through Belgian publisher Dupuis.
- In the CD sleeve of Vinyl Story by Jean-Charles Baty, featuring music by Django Reinhardt (2022), a mini comic strip by Baty about Reinhardt's life can be read.

=== Films ===
- Reinhardt's legacy is referred to in Woody Allen's 1999 Sweet and Lowdown. This fictional biopic features an imaginary American guitarist, Emmet Ray, who is obsessed with Reinhardt. Actor Michael Sprague appears briefly as Reinhardt. The soundtrack features Howard Alden, performing as the fictional Emmet Ray in a style strongly influenced by Reinhardt.
- The 2003 animated film The Triplets of Belleville begins with a flashback showing The Triplets of Belleville, a trio of singers, performing on stage in the 1920s, dancing alongside other celebrities, including Josephine Baker and Django Reinhardt.
- The 2004 film Head in the Clouds features guitarist John Jorgenson as Django Reinhardt in a cameo role.
- The documentary film Djangomania! was released in 2005. The hour-long film was directed and written by Jamie Kastner, who traveled throughout the world to show the influence of Django's music in various countries.
- Emil Lager portrayed Reinhardt playing guitar in a French cafe in the 2011 film Hugo.
- The film Django, by the French filmmaker Étienne Comar, depicting Reinhardt's life during wartime was released in February 2017, with the French actor Reda Kateb performing the role of Reinhardt. The Berlin International Film Festival held the world premier of Django. The movie covers Django's escape from Nazi-occupied Paris in 1943 and the fact that even under "constant danger, flight and the atrocities committed against his family", he continued composing and performing. Reinhardt's music was re-recorded for the film by the Dutch jazz band Rosenberg Trio with lead guitarist Stochelo Rosenberg. It opened the 67th Berlin International Film Festival.

=== Video games ===
- Reinhardt's music appears in the 2002 video game Mafia: The City of Lost Heaven. One of the songs featured in the game, "Belleville", would later appear again in its 2010 sequel Mafia II.
- Various Reinhardt songs, including his rendition of "La Mer", are included in the 2007 video game BioShock.

=== Television ===
- The music genre for the Backyardigans episode "Whodunit?" is in the style of Reinhardt's music.

== Tributes ==
- In 2005, during the election of The Greatest Belgian, Reinhardt was voted 66th place in the Flemish version. In the Walloon version, he was voted to the 76th place.
- The Belgian government issued a commemorative coin in 92.5% sterling silver in 2010 coinciding with the 100th anniversary of his birth. It is a silver 10-Euro coin with a color image of Reinhardt on the reverse side.
- The Django web framework is named after Reinhardt, as is version 3.1 of the blog software WordPress.

== Discography ==
=== Releases in his lifetime ===
Reinhardt recorded over 900 sides in his recording career, from 1928 to 1953, the majority as sides of the then-prevalent 78-RPM records, with the remainder as acetates, transcription discs, private and off-air recordings (of radio broadcasts), and part of a film soundtrack. Only one session (eight tracks) from March 1953 was ever recorded specifically for album release by Norman Granz in the then-new LP format, but Reinhardt died before the album could be released. In his earliest recordings, Reinhardt played banjo (or, more accurately, banjo-guitar), accompanying accordionists and singers on dances and popular tunes of the day, with no jazz content, whereas in the last recordings before his death he played amplified guitar in the bebop idiom with a pool of younger, more modern French musicians.

A full chronological listing of his lifetime recorded output is available from the source cited here, and an index of individual tunes is available from the source cited here. A few fragments of film performance (without original sound) also survive, as does one complete performance with sound, of the tune "J'Attendrai" performed with the Quintet in 1938 for the short film Le Jazz Hot.

=== Posthumous compilations ===
Since his death, Reinhardt's music has been released on many compilations. Intégrale Django Reinhardt, volumes 1–20 (40 CDs), released by the French company Frémeaux from 2002 to 2005, tried to include every known track on which he played.

- The Great Artistry of Django Reinhardt (Clef, 1954)
- Parisian Swing (GNP Crescendo, 1965)
- Quintet of the Hot Club of France (GNP Crescendo, 1965)
- Paris 1945 with Glenn Miller All-Stars (French Columbia, 1973)
- Django Reinhardt: The Versatile Giant (Inner City Records, 1978)
- At Club St. Germain (Honeysuckle, 1983)
- Swing Guitar (Jass, 1991)
- Djano Reinhardt in Brussels (Verve, 1992)
- Django Reinhardt & Stephane Grappelli (GNP Crescendo, 1990)
- Peche à La Mouche: The Great Blue Star Sessions 1947–1953 (Verve, 1992)
- Django's Music (Hep, 1994)
- Brussels and Paris (DRG, 1996)
- Quintet of the Hot Club of France (Original Jazz Classics, 1997)
- Django with His American Friends (DRG, 1998)
- The Complete Django Reinhardt HMV Sessions (1998)
- The Classic Early Recordings in Chronological Order (2000)
- Djangology (Bluebird, 2002)
- Intégrale Django Reinhardt (Frémeaux, 2002)
- Jazz in Paris: Nuages (2003)
- Vol. 2: 1938–1939 (Naxos, 2001)
- Swing Guitars Vol. 3 1936–1937 (Naxos, 2003)
- Nuages Vol. 6 1940 (Naxos, 2004)
- Django on the Radio (2008)
- Djangology: Solo and Duet Recordings (2019)

=== Sideman work ===
- Coleman Hawkins The Coleman Hawkins Collection 1927-1956 (2014; 1930s recordings)
- Charles Trenet Intégrale Charles Trénet: 1933-1947 (2004)

=== Unrecorded compositions ===
A small number of waltzes composed by Reinhardt in his youth were never recorded by the composer, but were retained in the repertoire of his associates and several are still played today. They came to light via recordings by Matelo Ferret in 1960 (the waltzes "Montagne Sainte-Genevieve", "Gagoug", "Chez Jacquet" and "Choti"; Disques Vogue (F)EPL7740) and 1961 ("Djalamichto" and "En Verdine"; Disques Vogue (F)EPL7829). The first four are now available on Matelo's CD Tziganskaïa and Other Rare Recordings, released by Hot Club Records (subsequently reissued as Tziganskaïa: The Django Reinhardt Waltzes); "Chez Jacquet" was also recorded by Baro Ferret in 1966.

The names "Gagoug" and "Choti" were reportedly conferred by Reinhardt's widow Naguine on request from Matelo, who had learned the tunes without names. Reinhardt also worked on composing a Mass for use by the gypsies, which was not completed although an 8-minute extract exists, played by the organist Léo Chauliac for Reinhardt's benefit, via a 1944 radio broadcast; this can be found on the CD release "Gipsy Jazz School" and also on volume 12 of the "Intégrale Django Reinhardt" CD compilation. (Note: Here is Lauren Oliver's transcript of the interview from the radio broadcast: Introduction: VO: In the Chapel of the National Institute for Blind Children, Django Reinhardt will, for the first time, hear his mass played on the organ, which he has written especially for the gypsies. (Organ begins to play) Interview: Announcer: Could you tell me Mr Reinhardt, what has compelled you to write this mass? DR: All the gypsies in the entire world have made use of foreign masses for many centuries. I have written this mass to be interpreted by choir and organ. A: And in what surroundings do you isolate yourself in order to write – it's not a question of surroundings. For you certainly cannot do it after a jazz concert? DR: I prefer to write in the evening very late or in the morning in my bed. A: And did you notate the music? DR: No, it's not I who notates the music. It's my clarinetist in the Quintet of the Hot Club of France, Gerard Leveque. I dictate it to him. A: And is today the first recital of your mass? DR: It is an extract of my mass. I particularly don't know the ending. It's the first time I have heard the composition on the organ. A: Certainly you know, Mr Reinhardt, that in the world and particularly in France, it is said that you are the king of the gypsies. Is that accurate? DR: No, no, no, don't think that. But it might come to pass, perhaps one day. I am very loved by them, and I thank them by offering to them this mass. (Organ continues to play))

== See also ==
- Oscar Alemán
- Django à Liberchies festival
- DjangodOr (Golden Django)
- Festivals de jazz Django Reinhardt, a French list of worldwide festivals dedicated to the guitarist
- List of Belgian bands and artists
- List of compositions by Django Reinhardt
- List of Romani people
- R-26 (salon)
- Jean Sablon
- Sinti
- Vernon Story
- Gábor Szabó

== Bibliography ==
- Ayeroff, Stan (1978). Jazz Masters: Django Reinhardt. Consolidated Music Publishers. ISBN 0-8256-4083-0
- Cruickshank, Ian (1982). The Guitar Style of Django Reinhardt. Self published. Reprinted as The Guitar Styles of Django Reinhardt and the Gypsies, Music Sales America, 1992, ISBN 978-0-7119-1853-5
- Cruickshank, Ian (1994). Django's Gypsies – The Mystique of Django Reinhardt and His People. Ashley Mark Publishing. ISBN 978-1872639062, OCLC 32394702
- Delaunay, Charles (1961). Django Reinhardt. Da Capo Press. ISBN 0-306-80171-X
- Dregni, Michael (2004). Django: The Life and Music of a Gypsy Legend. Oxford University Press. ISBN 0-19-516752-X
- Dregni, Michael (2006). Django Reinhardt and the Illustrated History of Gypsy Jazz. Speck Press. ISBN 978-1-933108-10-0
- Dregni, Michael (2008). Gypsy Jazz: In Search of Django Reinhardt and the Soul of Gypsy Swing. Oxford University Press. ISBN 978-0-19-531192-1
- Gelly, Dave & Fogg, Rod (2005). Django Reinhardt: Know the Man, Play the Music. Hal Leonard Corp. ISBN 0-87930-837-0
- Givan, Benjamin (2010). The Music of Django Reinhardt. University of Michigan Press, Ann Arbor. ISBN 978-0-472-03408-6
- Harrison, Max (1999). Django Reinhardt. In Alexander, Charles (ed.): Masters of Jazz Guitar. Balafon Books. ISBN 1-871547-85-7
- Jorgenson, John (2004). Intro to Gypsy Jazz Guitar. High View Publications / Flatpicking Guitar Magazine. ISBN 978-0-7866-3914-4
- Mongan, Norman (1983). The History of the Guitar in Jazz: Chapter 4: A Gypsy Genius. Oak Publications. ISBN 0-8256-0255-6
- Neill, Billy & Gates, E. (compilers) (c. 1945). Discography of the Recorded Works of Django Reinhardt and the Quintette de Hot Club de France. Clifford Essex Music Co. Ltd.
- Nelson, Willie; Ritz, David (2016). Pretty Paper. Blue Rider Press. ISBN 978-0-7352-1154-4.
- Vernon, Paul (2003). Jean 'Django' Reinhardt: A Contextual Bio-Discography 1910–1953. Ashgate Publishing; reprinted Routledge, 2016. ISBN 978-0-7546-0694-9
