= List of protected heritage sites in Pont-à-Celles =

This table shows an overview of the protected heritage sites in the Walloon town Pont-à-Celles. This list is part of Belgium's national heritage.

Object	Year/architect	Town/section	Address	Coordinates	Number^{?}	Image
rectory ^{(nl)} ^{(fr)}		Pont-à-celles	Pont-a-Celles	50.511773°N 4.364046°E	52055-CLT-0001-01 Info	Pastorie
Organ in the Church of Sainte-Vierge ^{(nl)} ^{(fr)}		Pont-à-celles	Obaix	50.527573°N 4.362723°E	52055-CLT-0002-01 Info	
Ensemble of "Terre à l'Danse" ^{(nl)} ^{(fr)}		Pont-à-celles	Pont-à-Celles	50.486310°N 4.422241°E	52055-CLT-0003-01 Info	
Chapel of Sainte Anne, protection around entire plot n ° 114 around the chapel ^{(nl)} ^{(fr)}		Pont-à-celles	Luttre	50.512703°N 4.386045°E	52055-CLT-0005-01 Info	Kapel Sainte Anne, beschermingszone rond hele perceel n°114 rond de kapel
Site "Bons Villers" ^{(nl)} ^{(fr)}		Pont-à-celles	Liberchies	50.507694°N 4.440170°E	52055-CLT-0006-01 Info	
Site of castellum: area of special value ^{(nl)} ^{(fr)}		Pont-à-celles	Liberchies-Brunehault	50.505226°N 4.429405°E	52055-CLT-0007-01 Info	
The main facade and the roof of Art Nouveau house on the rue des Ecoles No. 26 in Pont-a-Celles, (except the outhouse right) and the window in the door at the rear, a protection zone established around the house ^{(nl)} ^{(fr)}		Pont-à-celles		50.512407°N 4.359067°E	52055-CLT-0008-01 Info	De hoofdgevel en het dak van huis Art Nouveau aan de rue des Ecoles nr. 26 in Pont-a-Celles, (met uitzondering van het bijgebouw rechts) en het raam in de deur aan de achterzijde, een beschermingsgebied vastgelegd rond het huis
Facades and roofs of the chapel of Notre-Dame de la Charité ^{(nl)} ^{(fr)}		Pont-à-celles	rue de Scoumont te Obaix-Rosseignes	50.543628°N 4.310054°E	52055-CLT-0009-01 Info	
Facades and roofs of the local school, setting conservation ^{(nl)} ^{(fr)}		Pont-à-celles	rue Fond Nachez n°1 te Thiméon	50.489988°N 4.428407°E	52055-CLT-0010-01 Info	Gevels en daken lokale school, beschermingszone ingesteld
Facades and roofs of the farm of the diocese ^{(nl)} ^{(fr)}		Pont-à-celles	chaussée de Fleurus 29, te Thiméon	50.491156°N 4.430626°E	52055-CLT-0011-01 Info	Gevels en daken van de boerderij van het bisdom
Archaeological site of Liberchies: area of special value ^{(nl)} ^{(fr)}		Pont-à-celles		50.507694°N 4.440170°E	52055-PEX-0001-01 Info	
Archaeological site of Liberchies: area of special value ^{(nl)} ^{(fr)}		Pont-à-celles		50.505226°N 4.429405°E	52055-PEX-0002-01 Info	

== See also ==
- List of protected heritage sites in Hainaut (province)
- Pont-à-Celles
