= Bricktop (disambiguation) =

Bricktop (Ada Beatrice Queen Victoria Louise Virginia Smith, 1894–1984), was an American performer and owner of nightclubs "Chez Bricktop" in Paris, Mexico City and Rome.

Bricktop or Brick Top may also refer to:

- "Brick Top", a music track on the album Djangology
- "Bricktop" Wright (Walter Julian Wright; 1908–1972), American basketball player
- "Brick Top", a character in the film Snatch
- Mary Jane Jackson (1837–1897), an American serial killer active in Louisiana
