= Lousson Reinhardt =

French gypsy jazz guitarist

- Born: Henri Baumgartner; 11 December 1929
- Died: 8 September 1992 (aged 62)
- Parents: Django Reinhardt (father); Florine Mayer (mother)
- Relatives: Joseph Reinhardt (uncle); Babik Reinhardt (half-brother)
- Musical career
- Genres: Romani music, gypsy jazz
- Occupation: Musician
- Instrument: Guitar
- Years active: 1940s–1980s

Henri Baumgartner (11 December 1929 – 8 September 1992), known professionally as Lousson Reinhardt, was a French gypsy jazz guitarist and the first son of Django Reinhardt by his first wife, Florine Mayer.

== Biography ==
Django Reinhardt married Florine Mayer in 1927 according to gypsy custom although their marriage was not registered, and therefore not recognised under French law. Their son Henri, nicknamed "Lousson" from the French "l'ourson" meaning "bear cub", was born in 1929; however, shortly after this the couple separated and Florine remarried, and Henri's birth certificate bore the last name Baumgartner from Mayer's second husband. Henri/Lousson learned to play guitar from his relatives; he is pictured playing with Django and others in a photograph dating from the mid-1940s and played rhythm guitar with Django's "Nouveau Quintette" on a tour of Belgium in November–December 1948, of which an official release exists. Lousson was frequently on the road in the 1950s and 1960s and never recorded commercially except for an unreleased 1960s studio recording from Paris with violinist Vivian Villerstein.

A private and rather shy individual, Lousson performed in bars in Paris through the 1960s, most frequently accompanied by fellow guitarist Jean-Marie Pallen, and appeared several times at the Django Reinhardt memorial festivals at Samois-sur-Seine. According to author Michael Dregni, Lousson spent a number of years travelling in Italy, then returned to France in the early 1990s. Private recordings exist from a 1966 performance in Paris. He is seen at the start and end of the 1959 French film Les Pittuiti's performing "Les Deux Guitares" with Eugène Vées, and also appears briefly in a 1978 Sten Bramsen documentary Django made for Danish television.

Lousson's guitar style has been described as following the "most modern" of Django's styles as well as being influenced by Wes Montgomery and Jim Hall. At Samois in 1978 he is pictured using a Gibson ES-175 hollow bodied jazz guitar belonging to Django's brother Joseph. Francis-Alfred Moerman, who accompanied Sarane Ferret for many years, played with Lousson for several years in the 1960s and said, "Playing with Lousson was an extraordinary experience; he really had his father's genius in his fingers... he really was unlucky—his talent was awesome, but he played in the 1960s, which were the worst years for jazz players, so he was never successful and left no [official] recordings."

Feeling unappreciated by critics and not accepted by French authorities as the legal heir of Django, Lousson retired from playing in 1980. He reportedly had either ten or sixteen children. He struggled financially and frequently lacked a guitar after giving it to a doctor as payment for treating one of his children. Five of his children were sons; Dregni states that one of them, Paul "Navire" Baumgartner, was the father of Dallas Baumgartner, a contemporary gypsy jazz guitarist. (Note: Alternatively, if Dallas derives his surname via his grandmother Kali who Dregni states was the daughter of Bella and her second husband, then Django - and thus Lousson - would be a relation by marriage only; the precise situation is presently unclear.) Dallas was raised by his great-aunt Kali, Lousson's half-sister, referred to as "Madame Rose" in Dregni's 2008 account, and retains private recordings of Lousson, a number of which have been published by him via YouTube. After living the nomadic life of his people, Lousson died in 1992 and was buried at Samois near Django Reinhardt and Joseph Reinhardt. The names of two of Lousson's children, Chôti and Gagoug, were commemorated musically when Django's widow, Naguine, conferred them on two previously unpublished compositions of Django as subsequently recorded by Matelo Ferret in 1960.

== Discography ==
- 1948 Concert de Bruxelles, Django Reinhardt (live recording, Theatre des Galeries in Brussels, December 1948)
- 2002 Gipsy Jazz School – Django's Legacy, Various artists (1 track only)
- 2005 Django Reinhardt – Intégrale vol. 20, Various artists (Frémeaux & Associés; 1 track only)

== Further reading and viewing ==
- Dregni, Michael. 2008. "The Lost: The Secret History of Lousson Baumgartner and the "Other" Family." Chapter 13 in Gypsy Jazz: In Search of Django Reinhardt and the Soul of Gypsy Swing (for publication details see "References" section)
- Some relevant aspects concerning Lousson Reinhardt and Dallas Baumgartner are discussed on the "Djangobooks" forum here and here
- Lousson Reinhardt recordings and other information available via YouTube
- L.M. Oliver, 2008: Lousson Reinhardt, short documentary film (copy available via YouTube)
