= Babik Reinhardt =

French guitarist (1944–2001)

- Babik Reinhardt at Samois, 1990 (still from 1991 John Jeremy film "The Django Legacy")
- Born: Jean-Jacques Reinhardt; 8 June 1944; Paris, France
- Died: 12 November 2001 (aged 57); Cannes, France
- Parents: Django Reinhardt (father); Naguine Ziegler (mother)
- Relatives: Joseph Reinhardt (uncle); Lousson Reinhardt (half-brother)
- Musical career
- Genres: Jazz, jazz fusion
- Occupations: Musician, composer
- Instrument: Guitar
- Labels: Melodie, RDC

Jean-Jacques "Babik" Reinhardt (8 June 1944 – 13 November 2001) was a French guitarist and the younger son of jazz guitarist Django Reinhardt. He was christened Jean-Jacques, but generally known by his family nickname, Babik. His elder half-brother Lousson was also a guitarist, but the two grew up in different families and rarely met.

== Biography ==
Reinhardt was born in Paris. He learned guitar not from his father, who died when he was nine, but from his uncles, including Nin-Nin (Joseph) and Eugène Vées, and musicians of his own generation such as Vées' sons Loulou and Mitsou. According to writer Fred Sharp, his father initially encouraged him to take up the piano, believing "there would be more work for a pianist than a guitarist". At age 15 he appeared in Jean-Christophe Averty's 1959 film "Hommage a Django Reinhardt", playing rhythm acoustic guitar behind Eugène Vées, Joseph Reinhardt and Stéphane Grappelli. By age 18, he was playing electric guitar with the French rock and roll group Glenn Jack et ses Glenners, led by Glen Jack (real name Jacques Vérières), and participated on several of their EP releases in 1962.

Babik's first jazz recordings were made in 1967 with organist George Arvanitis. the four tracks, released as an EP, "Swing 67", include two of Babik's originals and two of his father's. From 1968 onward, Babik released albums under his own name, beginning with a collection of tunes by Sidney Bechet, which he played on a Gibson ES-175 electric guitar with a small group. His 1973 album, "Sinti Houn Brazil", included three lengthy original compositions, in more of a bossa nova style; and a 1974 release, "Sur Le Chemin De Mon Pere...Django", was mostly compositions by his father, but played in a mainstream electric style. "Three Of A Kind" (1975) was a collaboration with gypsy guitarists Christian Escoudé and Boulou Ferré in a contemporary jazz style, and included a 5-minute medley of Django Reinhardt compositions. It was followed by his albums "All Love", and others through the 1980s and 1990s, all in a mainstream/contemporary jazz style. He also collaborated with Romane on the 1998 album "New Quintet Du Hot Club De France", playing electric jazz guitar; the music includes four Django compositions, plus three of his own pieces, in a lightly swinging, modern update of the original Hot Club style.

In the 1990s, Babik arranged and contributed music for two French films: "Le Prix Du Silence" (1990), directed by Jacques Ertaud; and "Mohammad Bertrand Duval", by Alex Métayer (1991).

Drawn more to jazz fusion than gypsy jazz, Babik recorded with fusion pioneer Larry Coryell and French violinist Didier Lockwood in the 1990s. He visited the USA to perform on several occasions, his last appearance being at Birdland in New York City in 2000. In 2001, he died of a heart attack at the age of 57 in Cannes, France.

David Reinhardt (born 1986), Babik's and his wife Nadine's son and Django Reinhardt's grandson, is also gypsy jazz guitarist, tutored by his father from the age of six.

One track from Babik appeared posthumously on the album Generation Django (Dreyfus, 2009), a tribute to his father recorded by multiple musicians, including Babik's son, David, and Biréli Lagrène.

== Discography ==
- Joue Sidney Bechet (Vogue, 1967)
- Sinti Houn Brazil (CBS, 1973)
- Sur Le Chemin De Mon Pere...Django (Music for Pleasure, 1974)
- Three of a Kind with Christian Escoudé, Boulou Ferré (JMS, 1985)
- All Love (RDC, 1988)
- Nuances (RDC, 1992)
- Vibration (RDC, 1995)
- A Night in Conover (RDC, 1998)
- Babik Joue Django (RDC, 2003)

== Films ==
- 1959 Hommage a Django Reinhardt (playing rhythm guitar with Eugène Vées, Joseph Reinhardt, Stéphane Grappelli, etc.)
- 1991 John Jeremy film The Django Legacy (1 track only)
- 1995 Django: A Jazz Tribute, Biréli Lagrène and Babik Reinhardt live duets (re-released 2005, DVD)
