= Viesville =

Viesville Vivele (Walloon)
- Village
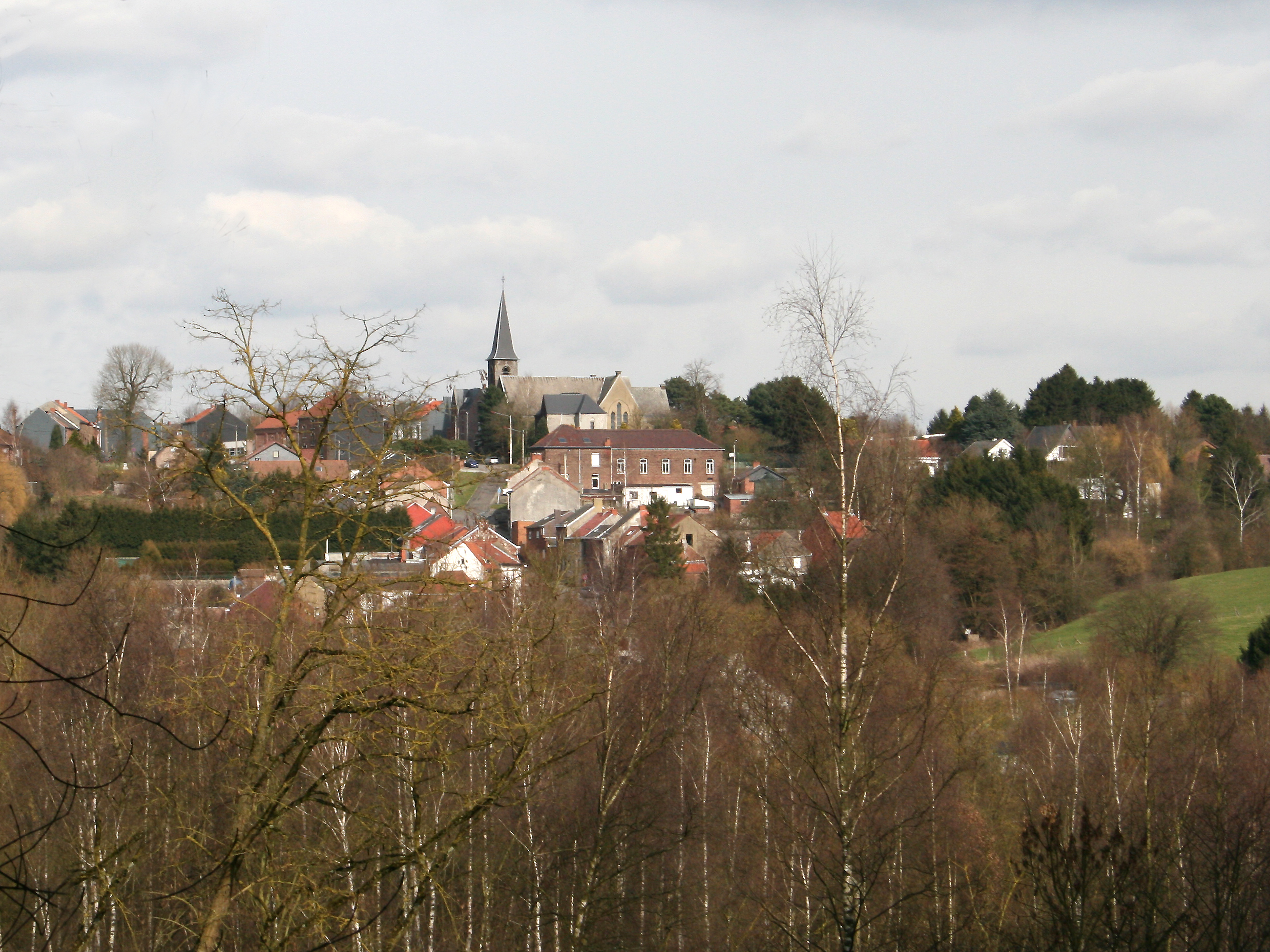
- The Viesville skyline

- Location of Viesville in Belgium
- Coordinates: 50°29′N 4°24′E
- Country: Belgium
- Region: Wallonia
- Province: Hainaut
- Arrondissement: Charleroi
- Municipality: Pont-à-Celles

Viesville (Walloon: Vivele) is a village of Wallonia and a district of the municipality of Pont-à-Celles, located in the province of Hainaut, Belgium.

The village is crossed by the Charleroi-Brussels Canal.

The European highway E42 crosses the Charleroi-Brussels Canal via a viaduct in Viesville.
