= Festival Django Reinhardt =

French jazz music festival

Coordinates: 50°30′49″N 4°25′15″E

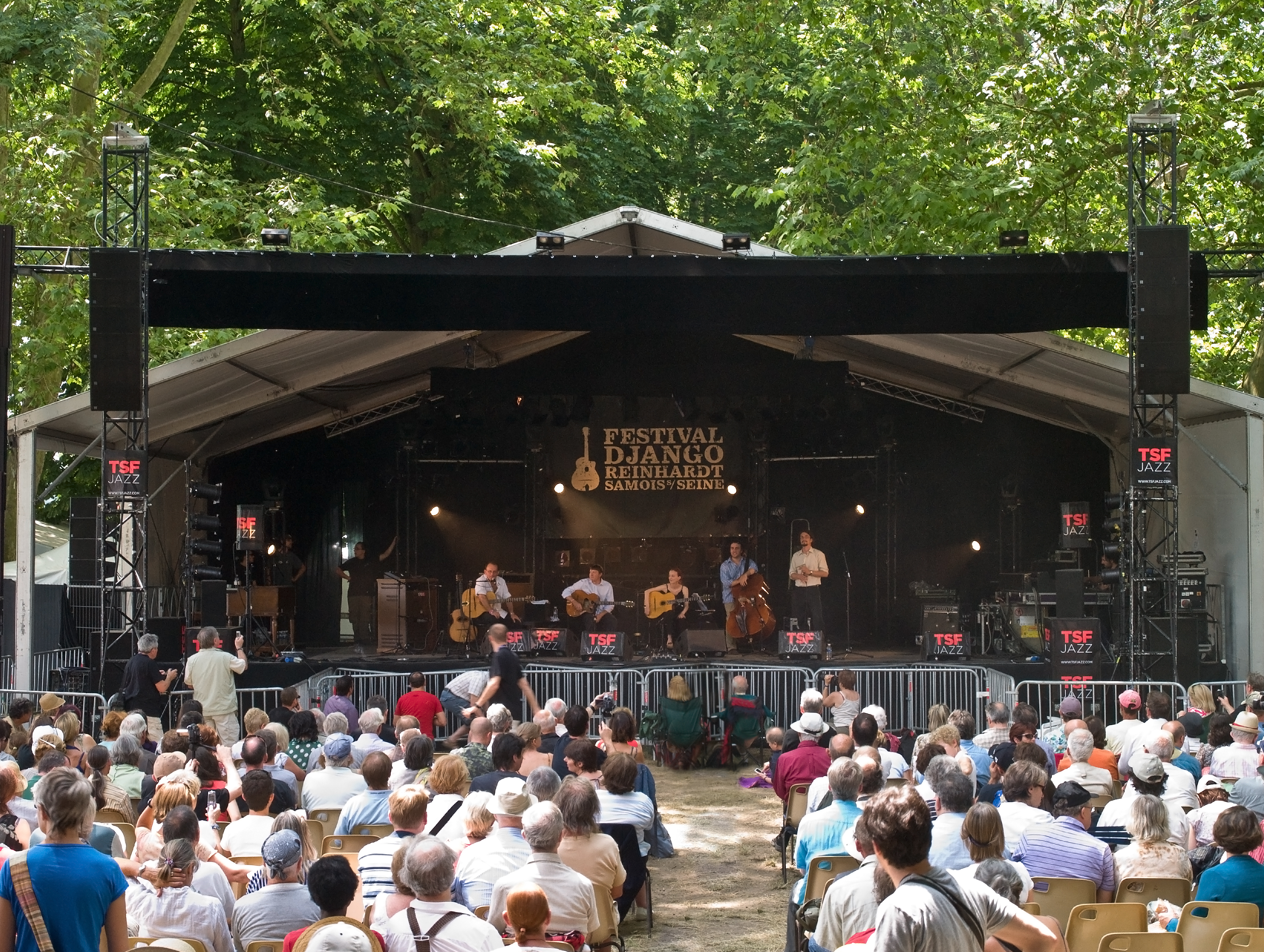
Django Reinhardt Festival in Samois-sur-Seine, France (2009)

The Festival Django Reinhardt is a Gypsy jazz music festival held during late June or early July at Samois-sur-Seine, France, and, since 2017, in the grounds of the nearby Château de Fontainebleau. It began as a single evening festival in 1968, but in 1983, became an annual week-long event commemorating Django Reinhardt and his music.

The festival combines a musical program with creative, leisure, and artistic activities about jazz, guitars, and Romani culture.

== See also ==
- DjangoFest in the western United States
