= Jazz in Paris: Nuages =

Compilation album by Django Reinhardt
- Released: February 18, 2003
- Genre: Swing jazz
- Label: EmArcy

Professional ratings
Review scores
Source	Rating
Allmusic	link

Jazz in Paris: Nuages is a compilation album of recordings by Jazz guitarist Django Reinhardt, released in 2003. The album was recorded in 1953; the first eight tracks on 10 March and the other four on 8 April.

== Track listing ==
1. "Blues for Ike" (Django Reinhardt) – 3:24
2. "September Song" (Kurt Weill, Maxwell Anderson) – 2:35
3. "Night and Day" (Cole Porter) – 2:52
4. "Insensiblement" (Paul Misraki) – 3:10
5. "Manoir de Mes Rêves" (Reinhardt) – 2:38
6. "Nuages" (Reinhardt) – 3:18
7. "Aquarela do Brazil" (Ary Barroso; Bob Russel) – 2:27
8. "I'm Confessin' (That I Love You)" (Al J. Neiburg, Doc Daugherty, Ellis Reynolds) – 3:39
9. "Le Soir" (Reinhardt) – 2:58
10. "Chez Moi À Six Heures" (Paul Misraki) – 3:00
11. "I Cover the Waterfront" (Edward Heyman; Johnny Green) – 3:27
12. "Deccaphonie" (Reinhardt) – 3:15

== Personnel ==
- Django Reinhardt – electric guitar
- Pierre Lemarchand – drums
- Pierre Michelot – double bass
- Martial Solal – piano
- Maurice Vander – piano
- Jean-Louis Viale – drums

Production notes:

- Christophe Henault – digital remastering
- Daniel Richard – production coordination
