= Luttre =

Village in Hainaut, Belgium

Coordinates: 50°31′N 4°23′E

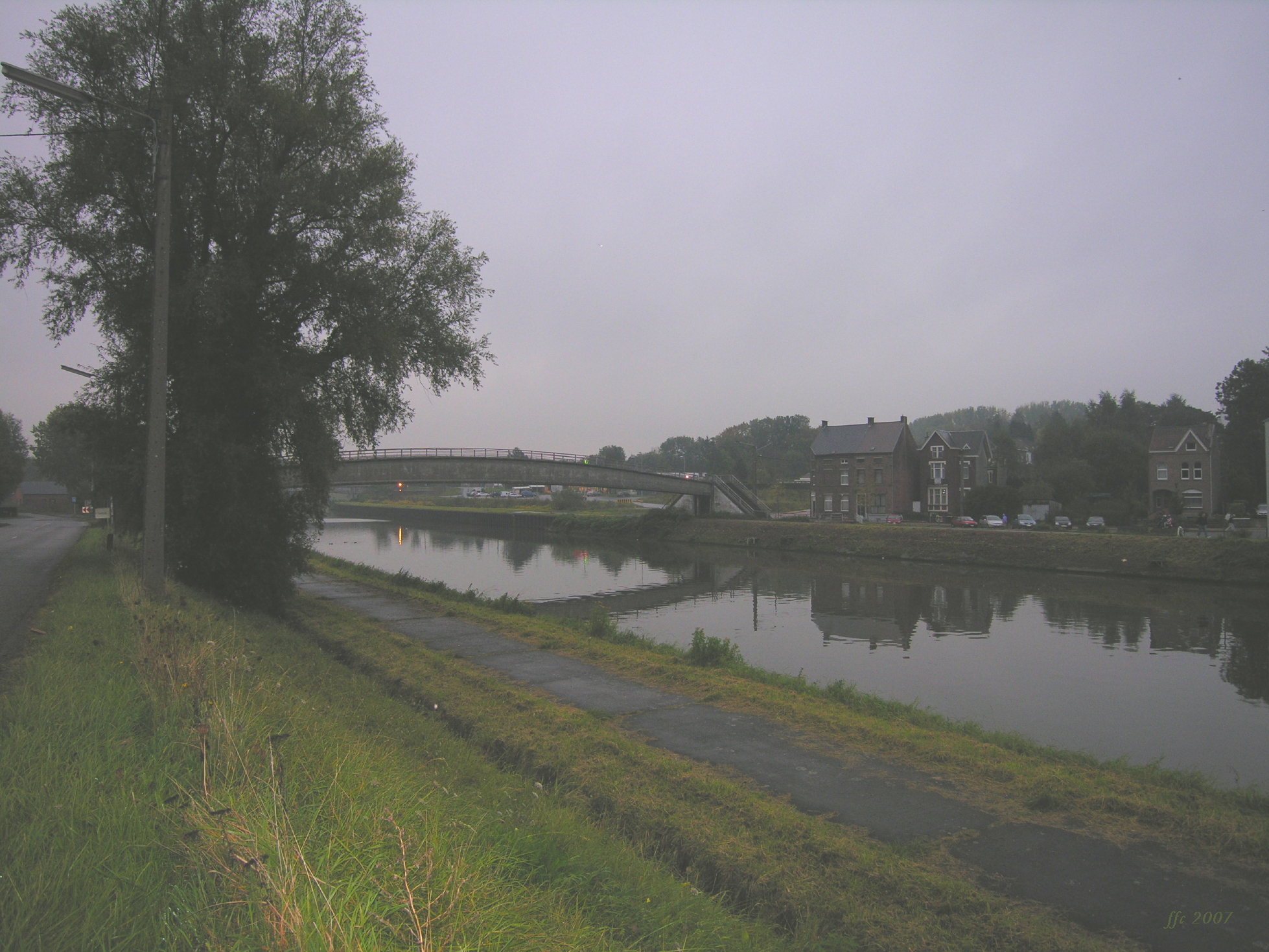
The canal at Luttre

Luttre (French pronunciation: [lytʁ]; Walloon: Lute) is a village of Wallonia and a district of the municipality of Pont-à-Celles, located in the province of Hainaut, Belgium, about 15 km north of Charleroi and 50 km south of Brussels along the Charleroi-Brussels Canal, railway line and motorway. Its name means crystal clear water.

== From the Roman times till the Belgian independence ==
Following the conquest of Gaul (57B.C-52 A.D), Rome re-organised the new territories. Northern Gaul became the province Belgica with Reims (in modern France) as its capital city. This province was further divided into ‘civitates’. The area that would later become Luttre belonged to civitas Tungrorum with Tongeren (in modern Belgium) as the capital city, and was near civitas Nerviorum with Tournai as capital.

The new rulers quickly developed a good road infrastructure (partly based on existing links). A ‘service station’ (Roman baths, taverns, stables….) has been discovered by archaeologists at Liberchies (a village located 3 km from Luttre) along the road “Bavai – Tongeren – Köln”.

The first document mentioning the name of Luttre dates back to the end of the 13th century. It was an agreement between the seignior of Rêves (also seignior of Luttre) and the monastery controlling the church of Celles (which would become Pont-à-Celles at the end of the 18th century). The agreement was signed in 1289 and from that time on, the priest of Celles would come thrice a week to hold services in a newly built chapel in Luttre.

It is generally agreed that the name of Luttre comes from an old German word “lutere” which means “pure, transparent, limpid water”.

Luttre was a tax haven in the duchy of Brabant, extending from Luttre, south of Nivelles, to St. Hertogenbosch with Leuven as the capital city. Luttre depended on Nivelles (duchy of Brabant) for administrative duties (e.g. taxes, justice) while the birth, marriage and death registers were kept by the priest of Celles which depended on Thuin, and thus to the principality of Liège (in Belgium). The church kept such registers at that time.

Being a tax-free zone, the inhabitants were exempted from paying taxes on consumer goods. It also meant that people from the neighbouring villages were coming to Luttre for alcohol, wine or beer. We can also imagine a number of inns and pubs for travellers as the Roman highway was quite near.

The area suffered due to continuous wars throughout the centuries. Nevertheless, a traveller in 1615 going from Tournai to Liège wrote about the crystal clear water of the “Piéton”, the stream crossing Luttre, and the beauty of the landscape (green hills, forests and surrounding prairies).

Because of the new ideas following the French Revolution in 1789, the Austrian Emperor (who was governing present day Belgian territories) wanted to impose reforms. It was followed by a period of unrest that ended with the French invasion in 1794. The old regime (i.e. rights of the seigniors, the power of the monasteries, the church keeping official registers) was abolished.

A new system based on municipalities was established in 1795. The municipality of Pont-à-Celles was created from 6 former seigniories (including Luttre). At the same time, the invaded territories were divided in 9 departments. Some municipalities, including that of the new Pont-à-Celles, were withdrawn from Nivelles (which went to the Dyle department, later which became the province of Brabant in 1815) and became part of the Jemappes (named after a French victory in 1792) department.

After the defeat of Napoleon in 1815, present day Belgian territories were united to those of the Netherlands. The Jemappes department became the current province of Hainaut.

== From the Belgian independence until today ==
Following the revolution of 1830, Belgium became independent. At that time, the municipality of Pont-à-Celles had only thin resources and could not obtain the subsidies claimed for improvement of the roads and construction of schools on its vast territory from the young Belgian State. The inhabitants of Luttre were dissatisfied with this situation, but the things would certainly have remained like that if there had not been a young teacher interested by the creation of a new municipality. There he could hope to be elected mayor or appointed head teacher of the new elementary school. Although his struggle lasted 3 years, he won and, in 1841, Luttre was detached from Pont-à-Celles and became an independent municipality. Irony of fate, the young teacher never got elected mayor of Luttre or appointed head teacher at the elementary school of the village. On the other hand, after a short union with Liberchies (from 1965 until 1977), Luttre joined Pont-à-Celles in 1977 with 5 other villages (Buzet, Liberchies, Obaix, Thiméon, Viesville) to form the municipality of Pont-à-Celles as it is known today.

== The canal ==
The canal which crosses Luttre was built in the 19th century. However, as early as during the 15th century, the magistrates of Brussels were leaning on a project of waterway which would connect Brussels and the south of the country. A hundred years later, mining developed in the South, but it was still very difficult to transport the coal to Brussels due to bad roads. The project of the canal came back on the surface, but the wars of religion deferred its realization once again. During the following centuries, various studies were outlined until king Guillaume (Dutch period) decided to take things in hand. The studies and work took place from 1819 until 1832. At the time of its inauguration, the canal was 74 km long and included 55 locks. Its completion also contributed to stop the regular floods of the " Piéton" which regularly cut the accesses between Luttre and Pont-à-Celles. During the 20th century, the canal was widened, and the number of locks was reduced.

== Railway ==
The station of Luttre, which was called in the beginning “Luttre - Pont-a-Celles”, was inaugurated on October 23, 1843 at the same time of the startup of the connection Charleroi - Luttre - Braine-le-Comte. It became possible to go from Luttre to Brussels by taking the trains connecting Charleroi - Luttre - Braine-le-Comte - Brussels. In 1874, a more direct line (124) was inaugurated between Brussels and Luttre via Waterloo and Nivelles.

Since 1998, Luttre is an IC/IR railway station along the line Charleroi-Sud - Brussels - Antwerpen-Centraal. Luttre is served twice an hour by IC (Intercity) trains Charleroi - Nivelles - Brussels - Mechelen - Antwerpen. This means that Luttre is connected every half an hour to Charleroi, Nivelles, Brussels, Mechelen and Antwerpen by a fast train. Luttre is also served every hour by the L (local) train Charleroi - Pont-à-Celles - Manage - Braine-le-Comte, and by another L (local) train Charleroi - Pont-à-Celles - Manage - La Louvière.

== Motorway ==
The motorway A54 (The caroloregienne) connecting Nivelles and Charleroi has an exit in Luttre, so that Luttre is connected to all major cities via the motorways A54 and E19 in Nivelles or A54 and E42 in Thiméon. The A54 motorway was planned in the 60s and was put into service in late 1969 for the part Thiméon - Gosselies - Charleroi and 1972 for the part Thiméon - Luttre - Nivelles, i.e. at the same time that motorways E19 (Brussels - Nivelles - Mons) and E42 (Mons - Charleroi - Liège).
