= Liberchies =

Village in Wallonia, Belgium

Coordinates: 50.5138°N 4.4209°E

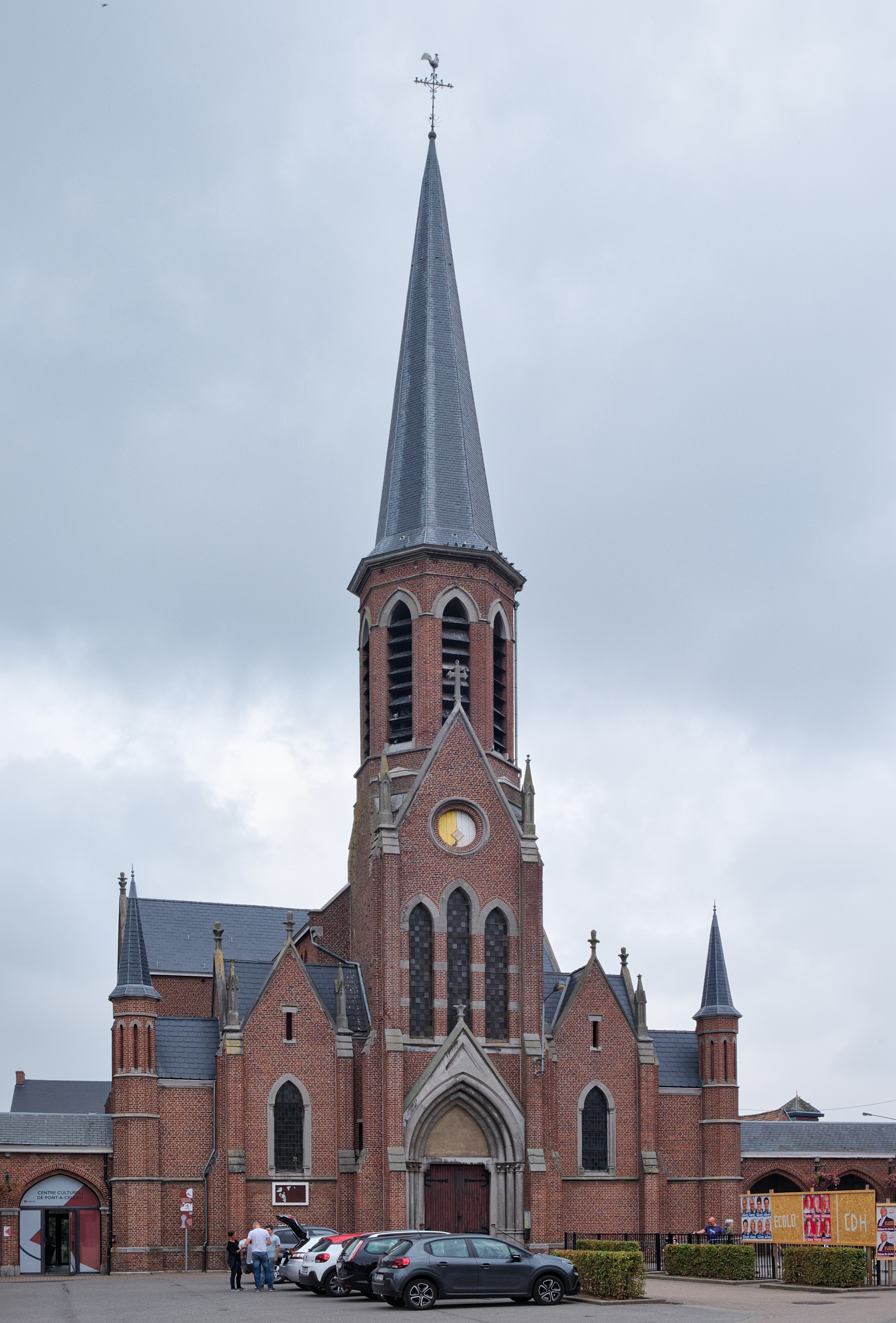
Saint-Pierre church

Liberchies (French pronunciation: [libɛʁʃi]; Walloon: Luberciye) is a village of Wallonia and a district of the municipality of Pont-à-Celles, located in the province of Hainaut, Belgium.

It is situated along the previous Roman highway Bavay-Tongeren where a vicus was discovered. Geminiacum is the name of the vicus (Roman village) that developed along the Roman highway next to the center of today's Liberchies. This village was created in 30 BC and was occupied until the end of the 3rd century. Being created as a relay for the Roman troops, it developed as a small town with a cultural life and economic activities. In 1970, 368 golden Roman coins were discovered on the site of former Geminiacum.

Liberchies was an independent municipality until 1964 when it was united with Luttre. In 1976 Luttre was united with Pont-à-Celles, of which Liberchies forms a district.

Every year in May a Django Reinhardt Jazz Festival takes place in Liberchies, Django Reinhardt's birth village.
