= Djangology =

Compilation album by Django Reinhardt, Stephane Grappelli
- Released: 1961
- Genre: Jazz
- Length: 63:33
- Label: Bluebird

Professional ratings
Review scores
Source	Rating
AllMusic	4.5/5 stars

Djangology is a compilation album by Django Reinhardt and Stephane Grappelli, released in 1961.

In 1949, Reinhardt and Grappelli reunited for a brief tour of Italy. While they were there, they recorded about 50 tunes with an Italian rhythm section, and although they did not know it at the time, these sessions would mark the last time the Romani guitarist and the French violinist recorded together.

This CD collects 23 of the best tracks from those final sessions, including versions of Hot Club standards like "Minor Swing", "Bricktop", and "Swing '42". Reinhardt died not long after he returned from Italy, so he and Grappelli were never able to continue their musical exploration.

== Track listing ==
1. "I Saw Stars" (Al Goodhart, Al Hoffman, Maurice Sigler) – 3:30
2. "After You've Gone" (Henry Creamer, Turner Layton) – 3:00
3. "Heavy Artillery (Artillerie Lourde)" (Reinhardt) – 3:40
4. "Beyond the Sea (La Mer)" (Charles Trenet) – 4:16
5. "Minor Swing" (Reinhardt, Grappelli) – 2:37
6. "Menilmontant" (Trenet) – 3:03
7. "Brick Top" (Reinhardt, Grappelli) – 3:44
8. "Swing Guitars" (Reinhardt, Grappelli) – 2:54
9. "All the Things You Are" (Oscar Hammerstein II, Jerome Kern) – 2:54
10. "Daphné" (Reinhardt, Grappelli) – 2:26
11. "It's Only a Paper Moon" (Harold Arlen, E. Y. Harburg, Billy Rose) – 2:51
12. "Improvisation on Pathétique (Andante)" (Tchaikovsky) – 3:44
13. "The World Is Waiting for the Sunrise" (Gene Lockhart, Ernest Seitz) – 2:52
14. "Djangology" (Reinhardt, Grappelli) – 2:46
15. "Où Es-Tu, Mon Amour? (Where Are You, My Love?)" (Stern, Stern) – 3:22
16. "Marie" (Irving Berlin) – 2:54
17. "I Surrender, Dear" (Harry Barris, Gordon Clifford) – 3:45
18. "Hallelujah" (Grey, Public Domain, Robin) – 3:09
19. "Swing '42" (Reinhardt, Reisner) – 2:26
20. "I'll Never Be The Same" (Kahn, Malneck, Signorelli) – 4:02
21. "Honeysuckle Rose" (Fats Waller, Andy Razaf) – 3:59
22. "Lover Man" (Jimmie Davis, Roger Ramirez, James Sherman) – 3:11
23. "I Got Rhythm" (George Gershwin, Ira Gershwin) – 2:44

== Personnel ==
- Django Reinhardt – guitar
- Stéphane Grappelli – violin
- Gianni Safred – piano
- Carlo Pecori – double bass
- Aurelio de Carolis – drums

Production

- Barry Feldman – reissue producer
- Joshua Sherman – series producer
- Seth Foster – engineer
- Ken Robertson – mastering
- Randi Alyssa Sherman – production coordination
- Frank Vignola – liner notes
- Don Gold – liner notes
