= Joseph Reinhardt =

French jazz guitarist

- Joseph Reinhardt in 1957 (still from P. Paviot film Django Reinhardt, 1957)
- Born: 1 March 1912; Paris, France
- Died: 24 February 1982 (aged 69)
- Relatives: Django Reinhardt (brother); Babik Reinhardt (nephew); Lousson Reinhardt (nephew)
- Musical career
- Genre: Gypsy jazz
- Occupation: Musician
- Instrument: Guitar
- Years active: 1930s–1940s

Joseph Reinhardt (1 March 1912 – 24 February 1982) was a French musician who was the younger brother of guitarist Django Reinhardt. He played rhythm guitar on most of Django's pre-war recordings, especially those with the Quintette du Hot Club de France between 1934 and 1939. He was a pioneer of the amplified jazz guitar in France and performed for years on a home-made instrument of his own design.

== Life and work ==
Reinhardt was born in Paris, France, on 1 March 1912, two years after his famous brother. In their teens they performed as a duo in the cafes and dance halls. Joseph Reinhardt was a member of the Quintette du Hot Club de France which recorded from 1934 to 1939. Beginning in 1943, he recorded as a solo act and with the Hot Four led by Stéphane Grappelli. After Django's death in 1953, Reinhardt briefly stopped playing guitar, but he returned to perform in Paul Paviot's documentary Django Reinhardt (1957), which included Grappelli, Henri Crolla, and other associates of Django.

In the 1961 film Paris Blues, a film a with a lot of jazz music, he appears (non-musical, non-speaking) as a guest at a rooftop party.

In his mid 60s, Reinhardt was photographed performing at the 1978 Django Reinhardt Festival in Samois-sur-Seine, which also featured his nephew and Django's first son Lousson, playing an electric Gibson archtop guitar. In the 1950s and 1960s, Reinhardt played an unorthodox electric guitar of his own construction.

He died on 24 February 1982 at the age of 69. He is buried in the cemetery at Samois alongside Django.

== Discography ==
- Django (as the Quintet Joseph Reinhardt) (Les Discophiles Francias, 1958)
- Hommage a Django Reinhardt (JB, 1965)
- Live in Paris (Hot Club, 1991)
- Joue Django (Ouest, 2010)

=== Sidework ===
- Performances with the Quintet Hot Club of Paris; Alix Combelle; Aimé Barelli; Hubert Rostaing; Bill Coleman.
