= Pont-à-Celles =

Municipality in Hainaut Province, Wallonia, Belgium

Pont-à-Celles Pont-a-Cele (Walloon)
- Municipality
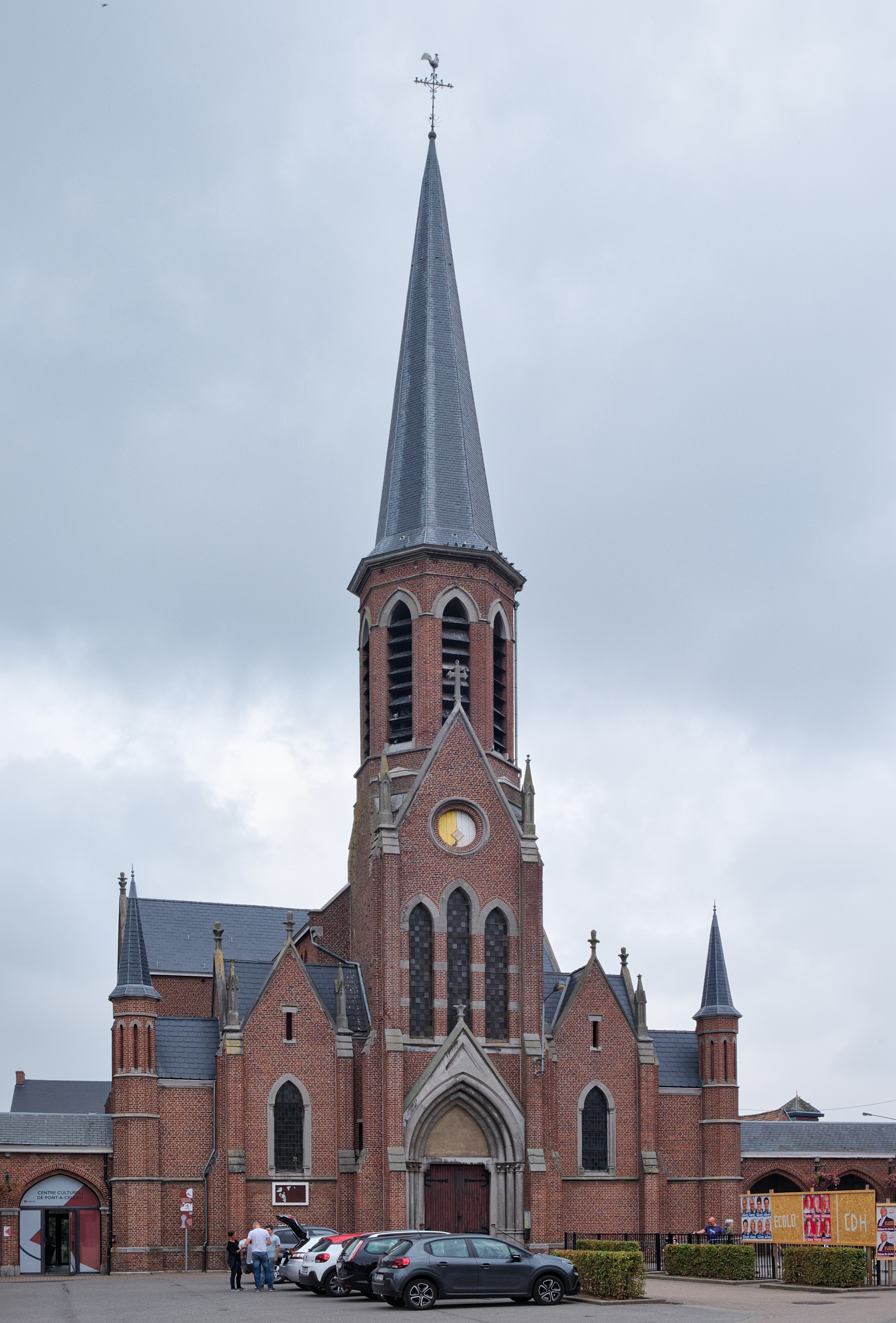
- Saint-Pierre church in Liberchies

- Flag Coat of arms

- Location of Pont-à-Celles in Hainaut
- Interactive map of Pont-à-Celles
- Location in Belgium
- Coordinates: 50°30′N 04°21′E
- Country: Belgium
- Community: French Community
- Region: Wallonia
- Province: Hainaut
- Arrondissement: Charleroi

Government
  - Mayor: Pascal Tavier (PS)
  - Governing party: PS - IC

Area
  - Total: 56.1 km^{2} (21.7 sq mi)

Population (2018-01-01)
  - Total: 17,287
  - Density: 308/km^{2} (798/sq mi)
- Postal codes: 6230, 6238
- NIS code: 52055
- Area codes: 071
- Website: www.pontacelles.be

Pont-à-Celles (French pronunciation: [pɔ̃.t‿a sɛl]; Walloon: Pont-a-Cele) is a municipality of Wallonia located in the province of Hainaut, Belgium.

On January 1, 2018, Pont-à-Celles had a total population of 17,287. The total area is 55.73 km^{2} which gives a population density of 310 inhabitants per km^{2}.

== Administration ==
The municipality consists of the following districts: Buzet, Liberchies, Luttre, Obaix, Pont-à-Celles, Thiméon, and Viesville.

== Origin of the name ==
Pont-à-Celles draws its name from Latin Cella, meaning room or cell of monk, probably because of the presence of the monastery founded in the 7th century, by Saint Amand (apostle of Belgium). The jurisdiction on which this primitive monastery was established, and then the priory of the Park, was called Celles, and later Pont-à-Celles.

The name of Pont-à-Celles appears for the first time during the 16th century, when the monks of the Park built a bridge over the Pieton river near the church. The parishioners of Luttre and Hairiamont then had to cross the bridge for going to service (hence bridge to Celles, or Pont-à-Celles in French). Gradually, this name extended to all the parish whose territory covered six seigniories.

When in 1795, the French replaced these six seigniories by a newly created municipality, they adopted the name of the parish (Pont-à-Celles). In 1815, after the defeat of Napoleon in Waterloo, its territories were annexed to the Netherlands. With this occasion, the department of Jemappes (to which Pont-à-Celles belonged) became the province of Hainaut.

== Notable people from Pont-à-Celles ==
The famous Jazz guitarist Django Reinhardt was born in Liberchies. Every May, the community honors him with the open air Django Reinhardt Jazz Festival.
