= Minor Swing (composition) =

1937 jazz standard

- 1937 release on the Swing label

Single by Quintette du Hot Club de France
- Recorded: 25 November 1937
- Genre: Gypsy jazz; swing
- Length: 3:20
- Label: Swing No. 23
- Composers: Django Reinhardt; Stéphane Grappelli
- Producer: Charles Delaunay

"Minor Swing" is a gypsy jazz tune composed by Django Reinhardt and Stéphane Grappelli, first recorded by their group The Quintet of the Hot Club of France in 1937. It is considered to be one of Reinhardt's signature compositions, as well as a jazz standard of the swing era.

== Structure ==
"Minor Swing" is written in the key of A minor. Apart from the brief introduction and final coda (or playout), there is no discernible melody, just a repeated sequence of chord changes over which the key players improvise until, by some mutual agreement, the end is decided, at which point the playout is performed.

The introduction comprises a set of partial arpeggios over the chords Am/Dm/Am/Dm/Am/Dm/E7, followed by the main changes which are Am/-/Dm/-/E7/-/Am/-/ followed by Dm/-/Am/-/E7/-/Am/E7, then the cycle begins again until the playout. The playout comprises set arpeggios following the pattern of the first half of the tune with one repeat. In some modern treatments, the E7 in the middle of the second stanza may be replaced with B♭7 (a tritone substitution), or the second stanza is replaced with a cycle of fifths based treatment for effect, i.e. Dm7/G7/Cmaj7/Fmaj7/B^{ø}/E7/Am, or both.

Although the chord changes and structure may appear repetitive, in a live performance, it is a vehicle that permits the soloist or soloists to demonstrate their musical skill for creating unique melodic and rhythmic excursions over the familiar chord patterns, as well as the opportunity to quote from Reinhardt's own recorded melodic inventions over his own tune.

== Reception and legacy ==
In a blog post for Jazz at Lincoln Center, trumpeter Wynton Marsalis wrote that he considered "Minor Swing" to be an "essential" jazz recording.

== Recordings ==
=== By Django Reinhardt ===
Biographer Charles Delaunay has compiled the following list of recordings to which Django Reinhardt contributed:

- Paris, 25 November 1937: Django Reinhardt, guitar; Stéphane Grappelli, violin; Joseph Reinhardt & Eugène Vées, rhythm guitars; Louis Vola, double bass
- Paris, March 1947: Django Reinhardt, guitar; Eddie Bernard, piano (French Radio broadcast; as "No Name Blues")
- Paris, 29 August 1947: Django Reinhardt, guitar; Maurice Mernier, clarinet; Eugène Vées, rhythm guitar; Emmanuel Soudieux, double bass; André Jourdan, drums
- Brussels, December 1948: Django Reinhardt, guitar; Hubert Rostaing, clarinet; Henri "Lousson" Baumgartner, rhythm guitar; Louis Vola, double bass; Arthur Motta, drums
- Rome, January–February 1949: Django Reinhardt, guitar; Stéphane Grappelli, violin; Gianni Safred, piano; Carlo Pecori, double bass; Aurelio de Carolis, drums
- Rome, April–May 1950: Django Reinhardt, guitar; André Ekyan, clarinet; Raph Schecroun, piano; Alf Masselier, double bass; Roger Paraboschi, drums
