= Studio Harcourt =

French photography studio

Coordinates: 48°52′00″N 2°18′32″E

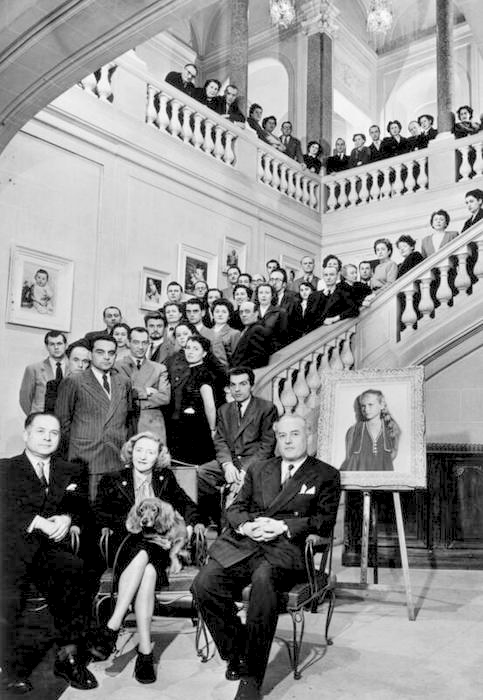
Studio Harcourts personnel 1950.

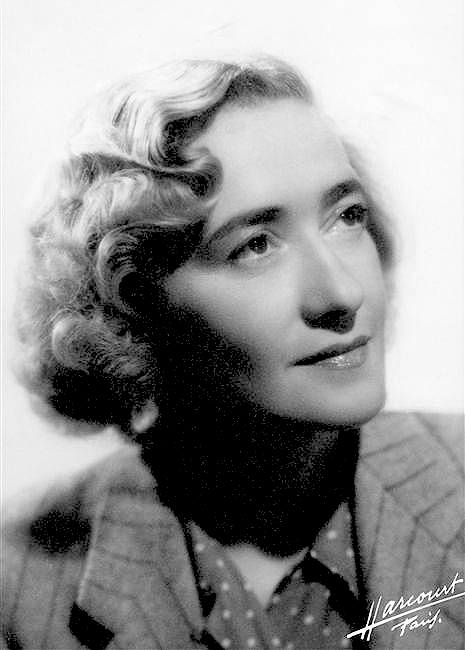
Cosette Harcourt (Germaine Hirschfeld)

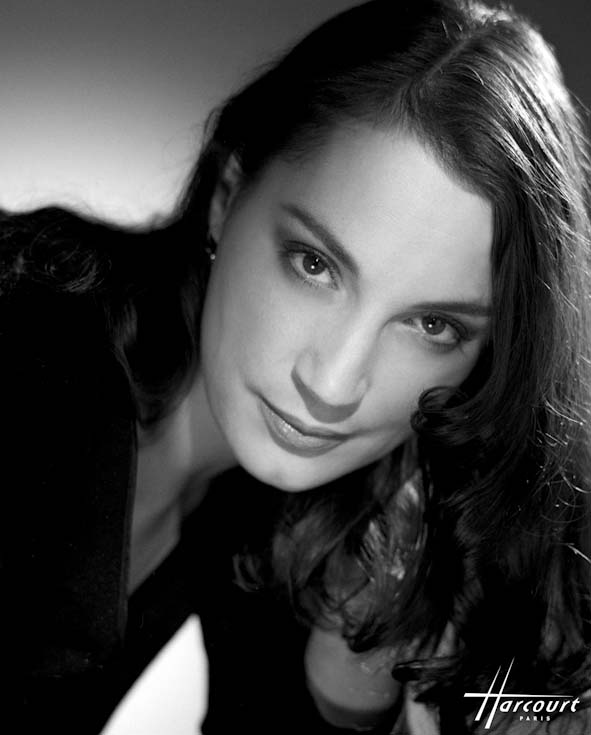
Typical photograph (of actress and singer Jeanne Balibar) by Studio Harcourt, showing their distinctive "glamorous 1940s movie star"-like approach to portrait photography

Studio Harcourt is a photography studio founded in 1933 by Cosette Harcourt at 11, rue Christophe-Colomb in Paris. In 1934, she joined forces with the Lacroix brothers, press bosses and Robert Ricci, son of Nina Ricci to found the Harcourt studio. It is known in particular for its black-and-white photographs of movie stars and celebrities, but having one's photo taken at Harcourt a few times during one's life was once considered standard by the French upper middle class. The studio is currently located at 6, rue de Lota in the 16th arrondissement of Paris.

== History ==
Harcourt Studio Photography is the result of the association of the brothers Lacroix and Germaine Hirschfeld (1900–1976) aka Cosette Harcourt, a photographer who had worked in the studio of the brothers Manuel. Initially, the company produced images for the press, at a time when prestigious photo studios like Nadar closed for lack of clients.

The change in direction came when Cosette Harcourt started to specialize in black-and-white glamour photography of figures from French cinema and culture, always using 24 x 30 cm prints immediately recognizable for their distinctive style and lighting. This typical Harcourt style consists of a photo taken at close distance to the subject in its best light, generally creating a halo of light and dark, on a gray-to-black background. The attitude of the subject is personal, often wearing a slight smile, but somehow always seeming a little staged. Also, the Harcourt logo is featured prominently on every print.

This Harcourt style was inspired by the work of French cinematographer Henri Alekan. Around the time of World War II, Cosette Harcourt, who was Jewish, married one of the Lacroix brothers. Together they created a magazine, called Stars, to serve as an outlet for studio photos. During the occupation of France by the Nazis, German officers and many members of the Vichy regime visited the studios, just as the Americans did after the French Liberation. After the war, Harcourt regained its momentum with movie star photography, continuing the tradition that made it successful initially.

In 2000, at the initiative of Jack Lang, the French state bought the photos of Studio Harcourt from between 1934 and 1991: about 5 million negatives of 550,000 persons and 1,500 celebrities.

As of 2024, having an American portrait photo taken at Harcourt costs 995 Euros. However, a close-up traditional Harcourt portrait costs 1,995 Euros due to the extra makeup and lighting work needed to properly capture the subject's essence. An alternative is using one of the official Cabine Photo Luxe photo booths that take a picture for 10 euros and process it to achieve the Harcourt look.

== Gallery ==
Photographs from Studio Harcourt

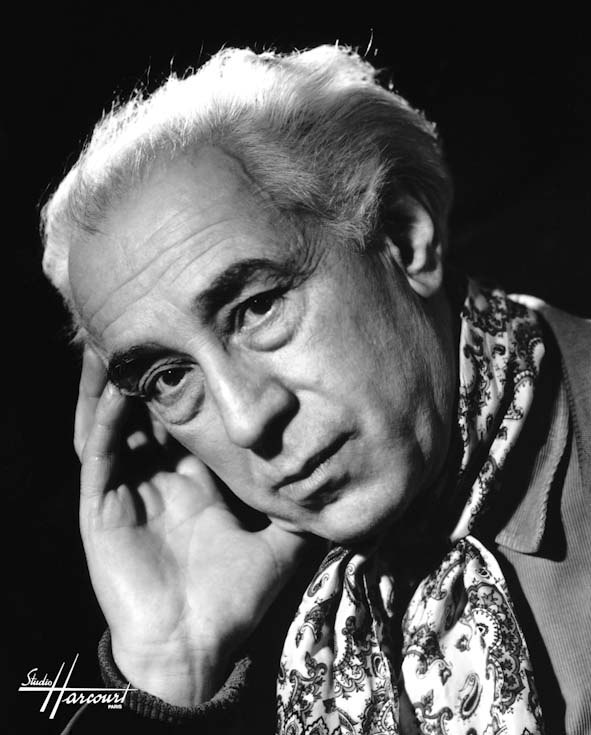
Abel Gance in 1957

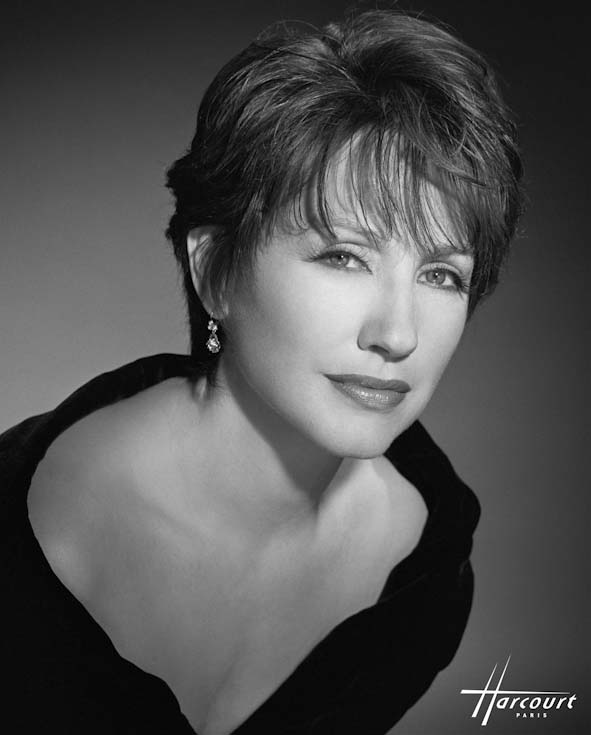
Nathalie Baye in 1994

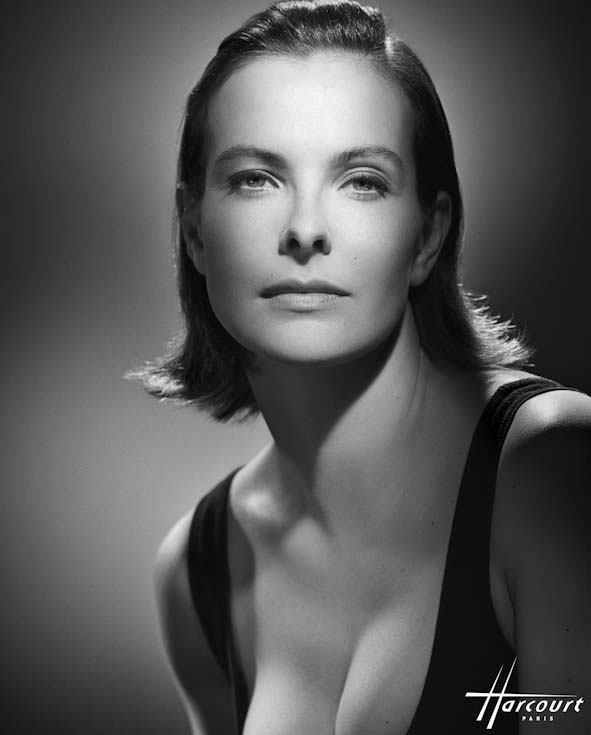
Carole Bouquet in 1995

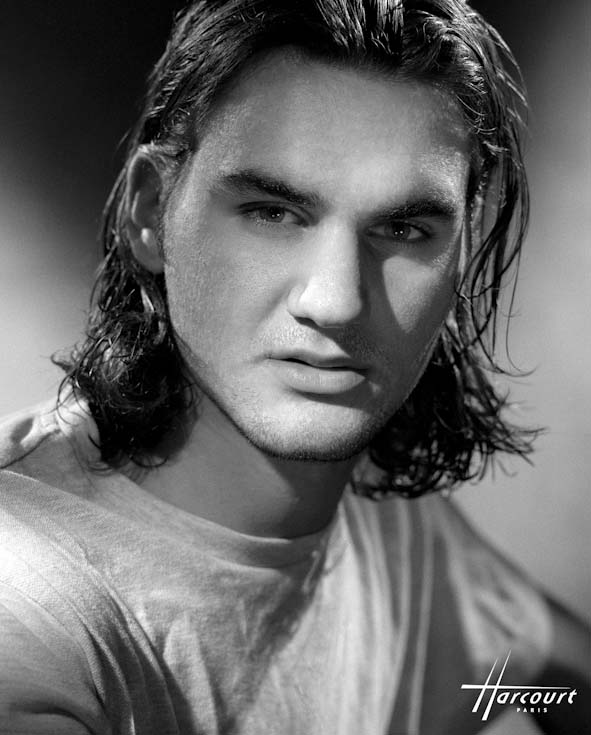
Roger Federer in 1998

Marion Cotillard in 1999

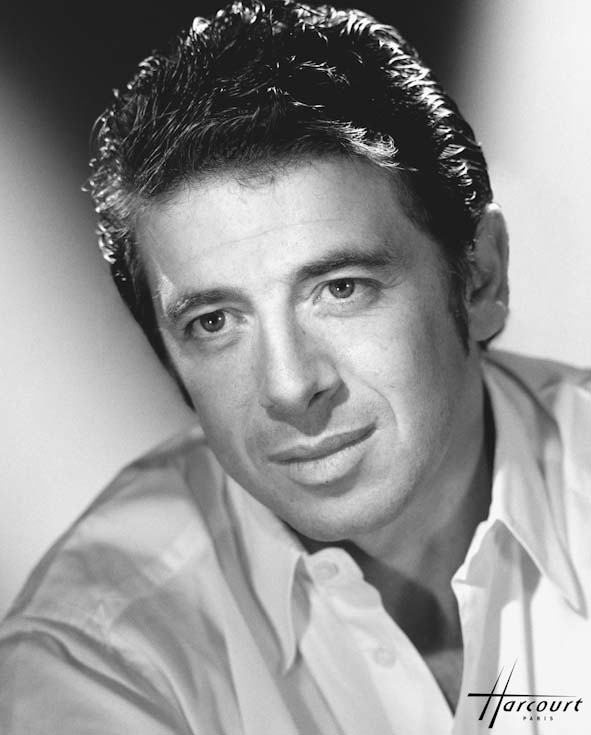
Patrick Bruel in 2002

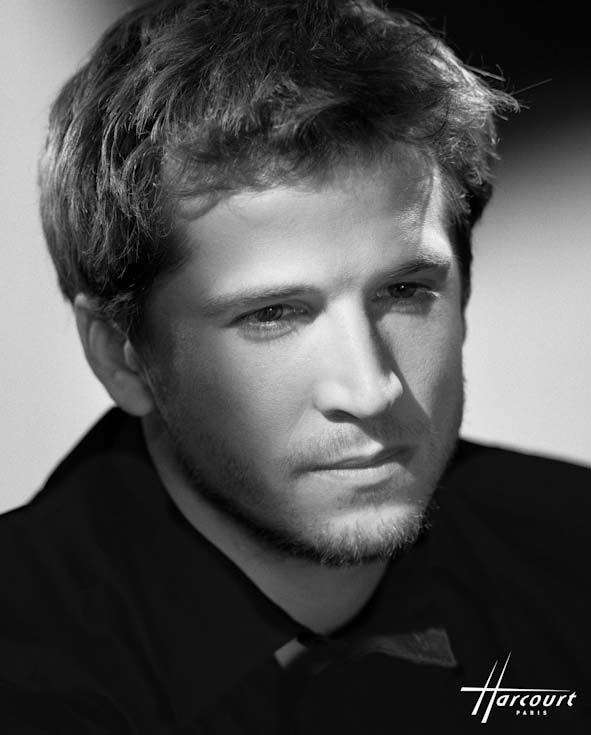
Guillaume Canet in 2004

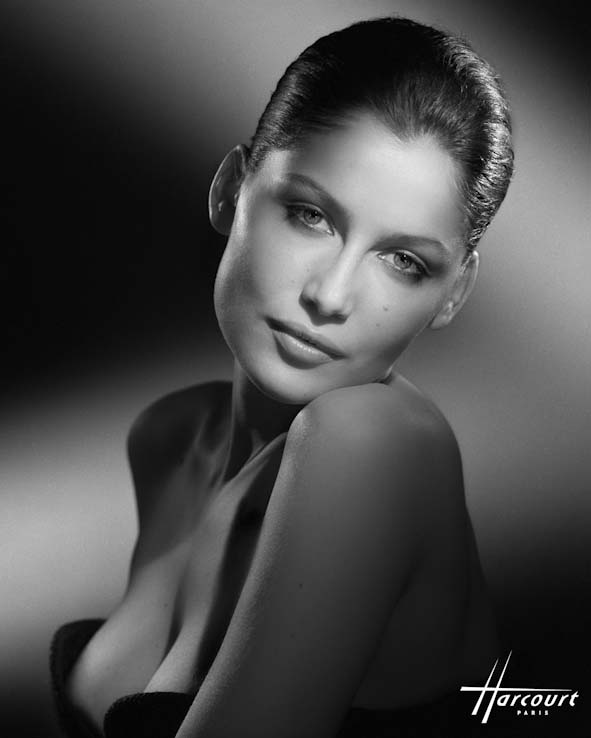
Laetitia Casta in 2005

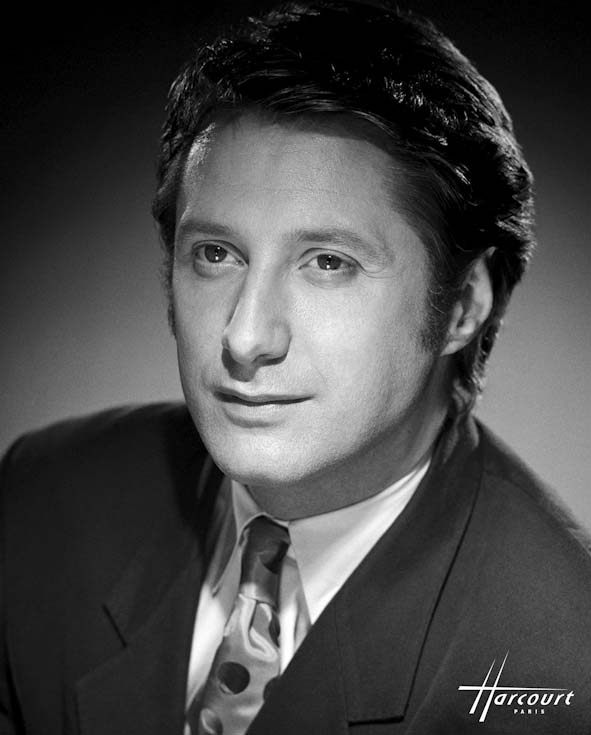
Antoine de Caunes in 2005

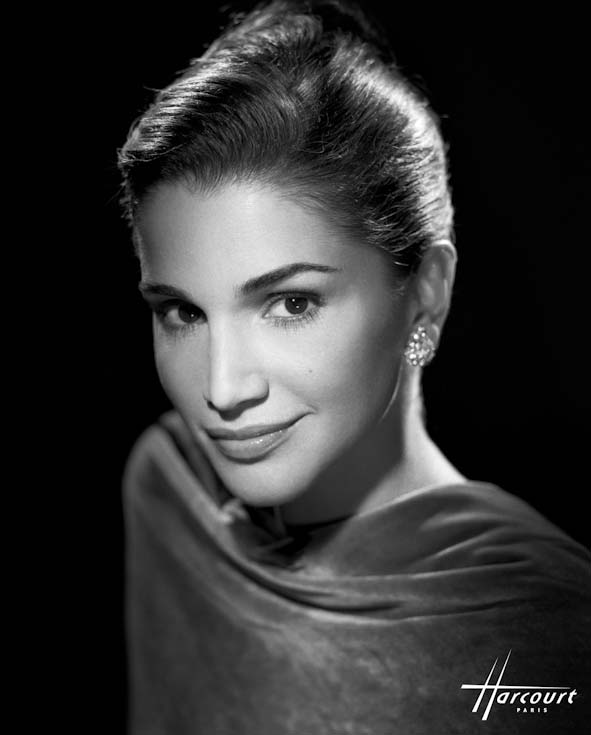
Queen Rania of Jordan in 2005

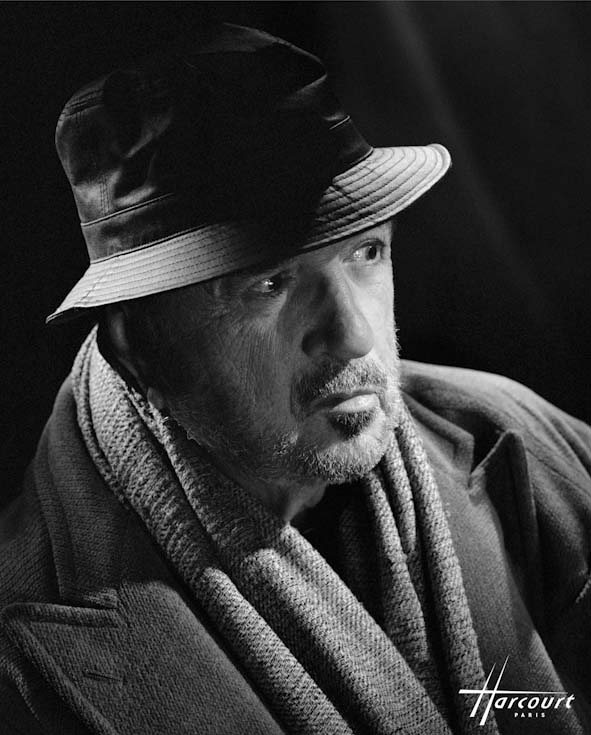
Jean-Claude Carrière in 2006

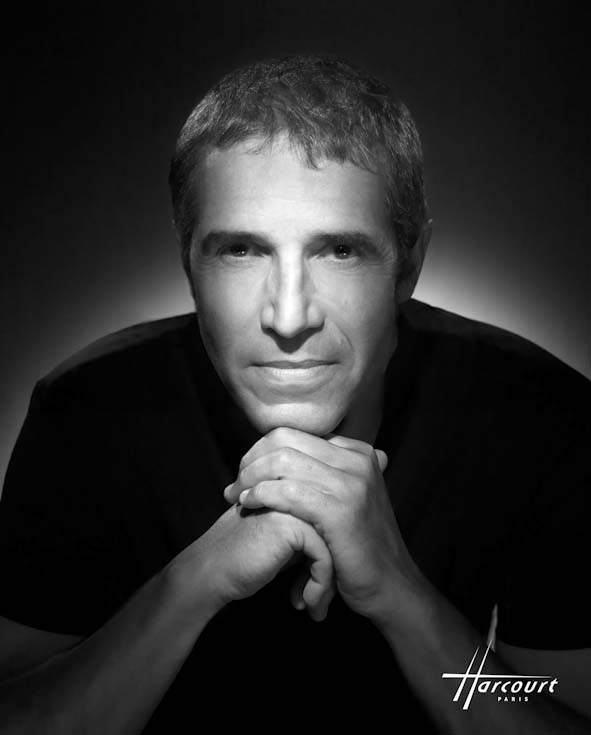
Julien Clerc in 2008

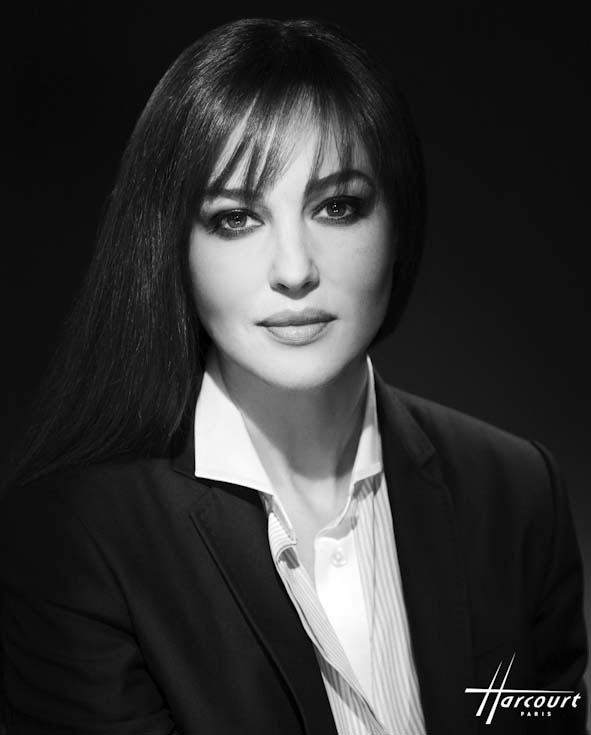
Monica Bellucci in 2008

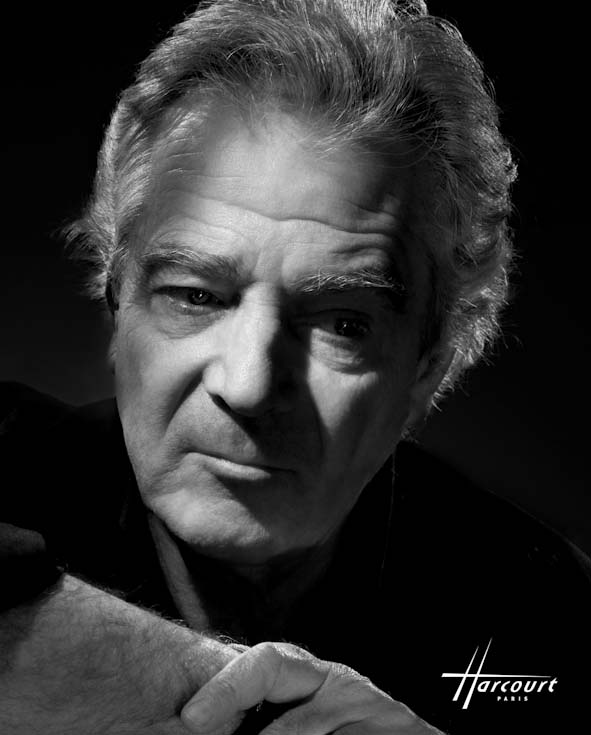
Pierre Arditi in 2009

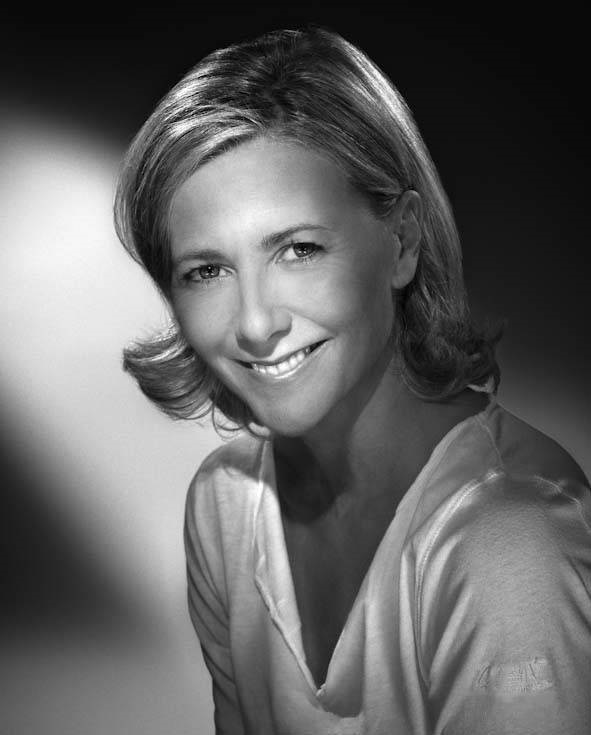
Claire Chazal in 2009

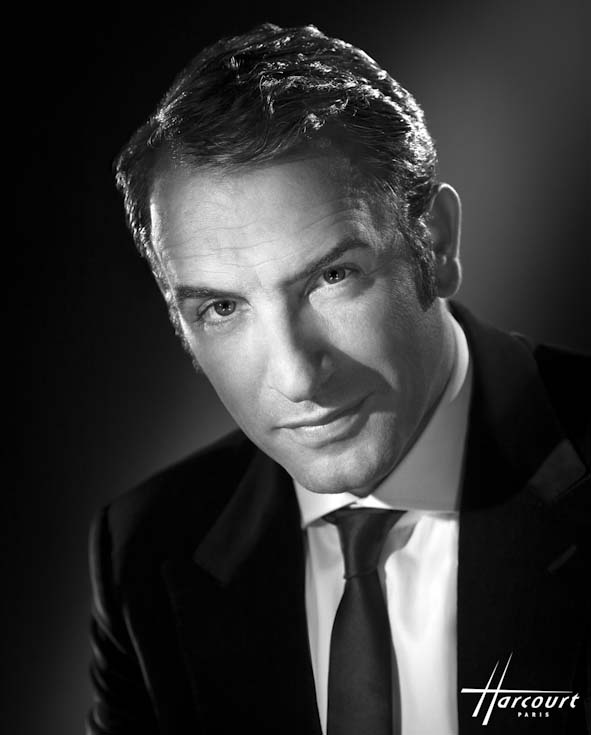
Jean Dujardin in 2009
