= Samois-sur-Seine =

- Commune
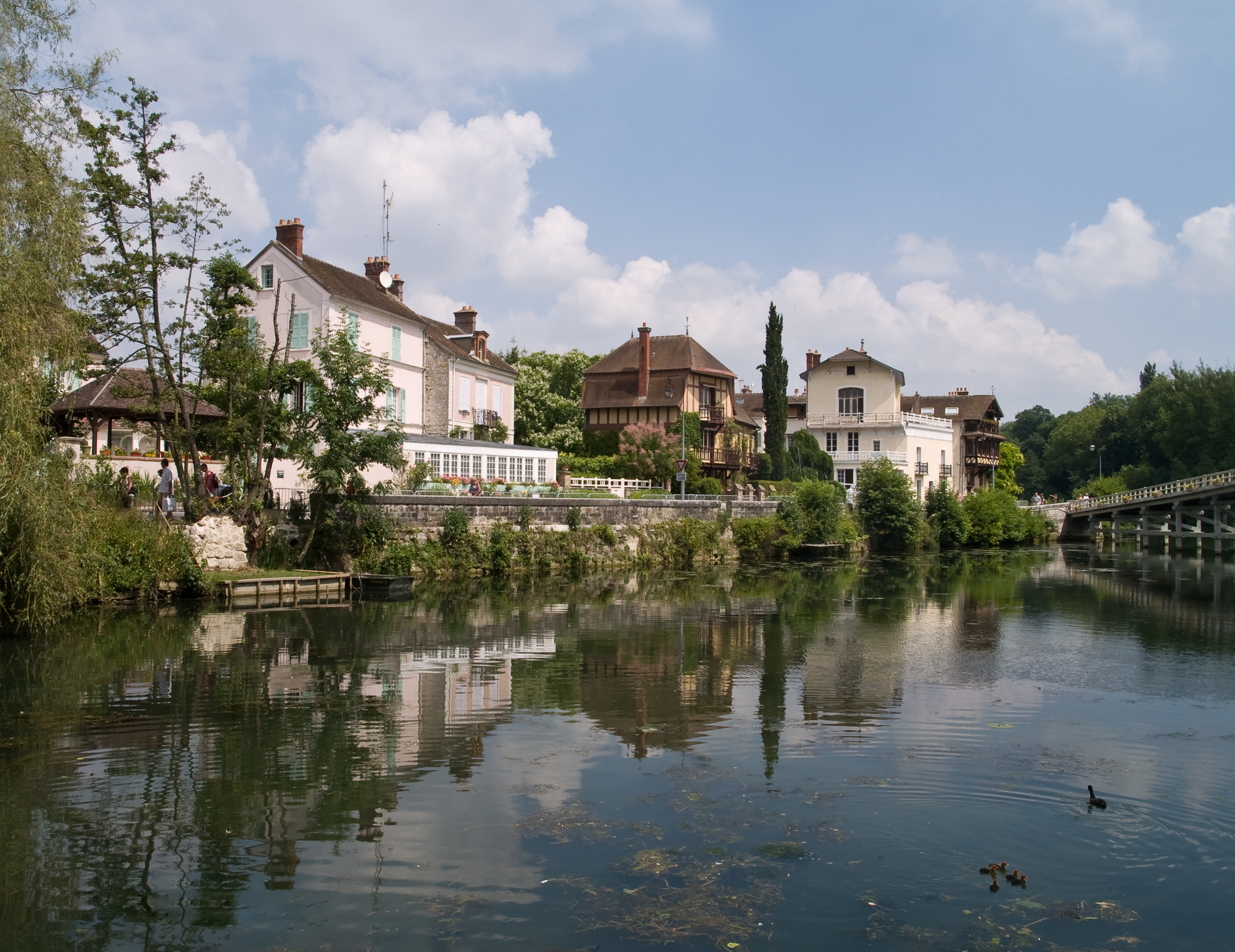
- The River Seine in Samois-sur-Seine

- Coat of arms
- Location of Samois-sur-Seine
- Location within France Location within Île-de-France (region)
- Coordinates: 48°27′10″N 2°45′02″E
- Country: France
- Region: Île-de-France
- Department: Seine-et-Marne
- Arrondissement: Fontainebleau
- Canton: Fontainebleau
- Intercommunality: CA Pays de Fontainebleau

Government
  - Mayor (2020–2026): Michel Chariau
- Area^{1}: 6.33 km^{2} (2.44 sq mi)
- Highest elevation: 115 m (377 ft)
- Lowest elevation: 41 m (135 ft)
- Population (2023): 2,126
  - Density: 336/km^{2} (870/sq mi)
- Time zone: UTC+01:00 (CET)
  - Summer (DST): UTC+02:00 (CEST)
- INSEE/Postal code: 77441 /77920
- ^{1} French Land Register data, which excludes lakes, ponds, glaciers > 1 km^{2} (0.386 sq mi or 247 acres) and river estuaries.

Samois-sur-Seine (French pronunciation: [samwa syʁ sɛn], lit. 'Samois on Seine') is a commune in the Seine-et-Marne department in the Île-de-France region in north-central France. It is located near Fontainebleau.

== Culture ==
It is famous for being the town to which Django Reinhardt retired, and hosts an annual jazz festival in his honor. It was also the home to Reverchon Industries, a major global bumper car and other amusement ride producer. It is the birthplace of French jazz singer Cyrille Aimée. It has a lively community, with a primary school, a weekly market, a baker, a butcher, two cafés/bars, several restaurants and hotels. A bus also provides a link to the nearby town of Fontainebleau/Avon, the route of the world's first commercial trolleybus 1901–1913.

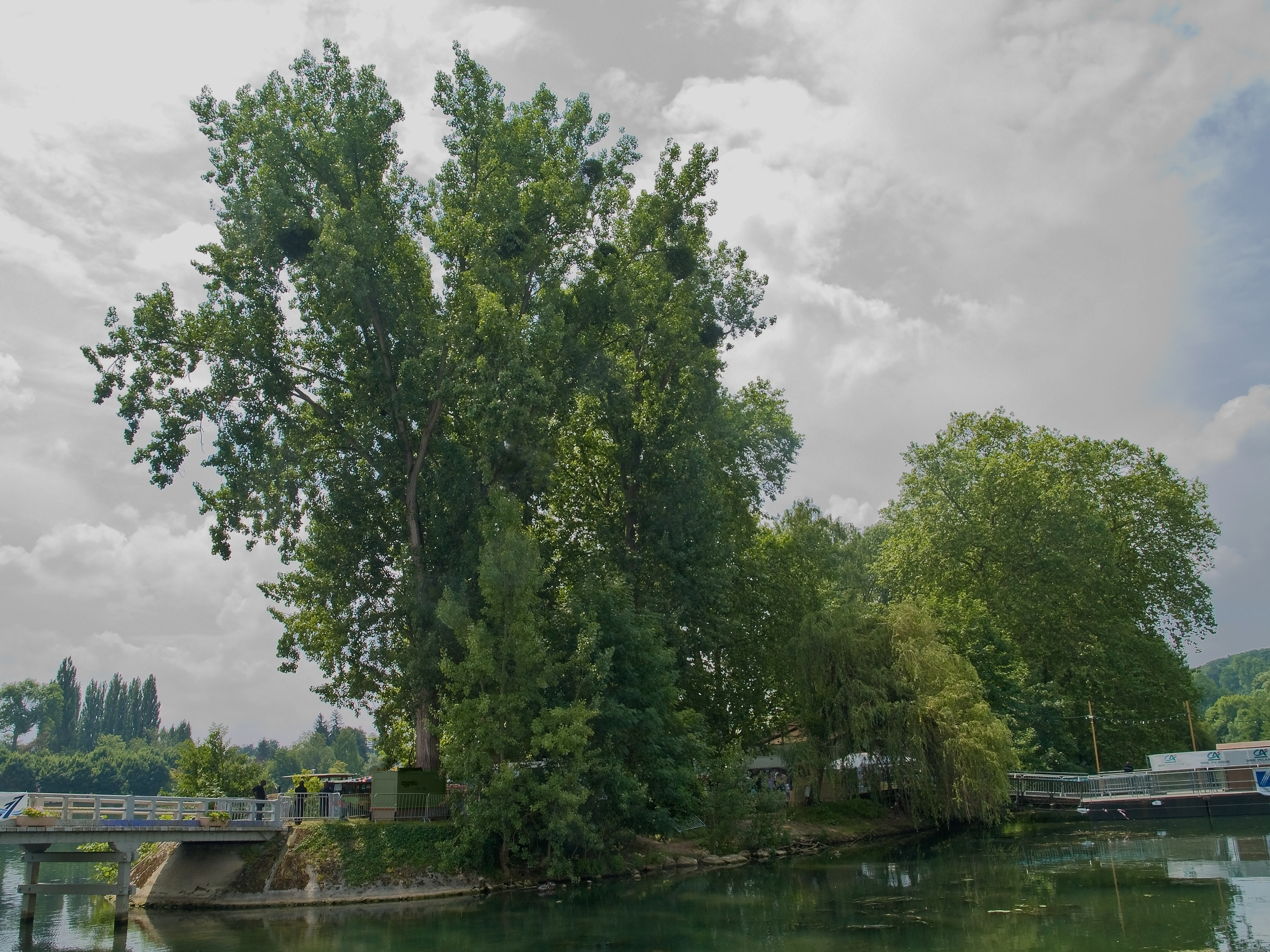
Île du Berceau, where the Django Reinhardt festival takes place

== Demographics ==
Inhabitants of Samois-sur-Seine are called Samoisiens in French.

Historical population
Year	Pop.	±% p.a.
1968	1,373	—
1975	1,574	+1.97%
1982	1,574	+0.00%
1990	1,916	+2.49%
1999	2,236	+1.73%
2007	2,062	−1.01%
2012	2,098	+0.35%
2017	2,053	−0.43%
2023	2,126	+0.58%
Source: Cassini and INSEE

== Literary reference and namesake ==
The town is mentioned in the 1954 novel Story of O by Anne Desclos as the location of the fictional mansion managed by Anne-Marie, a lesbian dominatrix. In 1978, the name Samois was adopted by a lesbian-feminist BDSM organization based in San Francisco that existed from 1978 to 1983. It was the first lesbian BDSM group in the United States.

== See also ==
- Communes of the Seine-et-Marne department
- Maud Gonne – The cemetery of Samois-sur-Seine is where in 1893 the English-born Irish republican revolutionary, suffragette, and actress Maud Gonne conceived Iseult Gonne in a sex magick ritual to reincarnate the soul of her dead son, in the crypt of the child's mausoleum, next to the coffin.
