= Eve Ferret =

British actress, comedian and singer-songwriter (born 1955)

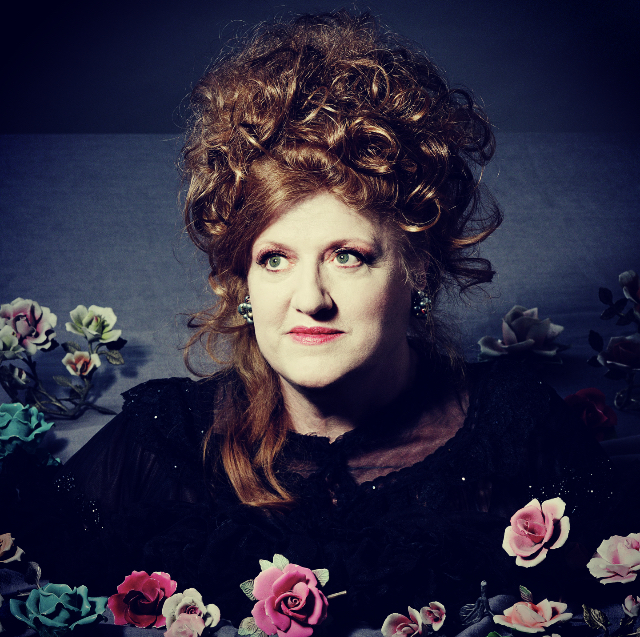
- Born: 14 October 1955 (age 70); London, England
- Occupations: Actress, comedian and singer-songwriter

Eve Ferret (born 14 October 1955) is a British actress, comedian, and singer-songwriter known for her work on the films Haunted Honeymoon (1986), Absolute Beginners (1986), and EastEnders (2019).

== Personal life ==
Eve Ferret is the eldest of three children born in Pimlico, London. Her mother, Janet, is one of seven sisters also raised in Pimlico and was a professional tea lady. Her father, Paul Ferret from Barnet, painted the Pimlico houses in summer and at one point delivered coal in winter. Eve and her family are related to the Gypsy jazz guitarists Pierre 'Baro' Ferret, Jean 'Matelo' Ferret, and Etienne 'Sarane' Ferret who played with Django Reinhardt in the Quintette of the Hot Club Of France.

== Career ==
Ferret graduated from singing in a cabaret act called Biddie & Eve at the seminal 'Blitz' nightclub in the late 1970s to appearing alongside David Bowie in both his Grammy Award-winning video Jazzin' for Blue Jean and director Julien Temple's Absolute Beginners as Big Jill to starring in Hollywood movies, chosen by Gene Wilder to appear alongside him as Sylvia, an ex-girlfriend, in his movie Haunted Honeymoon. Ronald Neame (who directed Judy Garland's last film) also chose Eve to play Norah Plumb in his film Foreign Body.

== Filmography ==
Year	Film	Role	Notes
1986	Absolute Beginners	Big Jill	Drama Musical by Julien Temple
1986	Haunted Honeymoon	Sylvia	Comedy by Gene Wilder
1986	Foreign Body	Norah Plumb	Comedy by Ronald Neame
1987	Billy The Kid And The Green Baize Vampire	Mrs Randall	Comedy by Alan Clarke
1997	Keep The Aspidistra Flying	Barmaid	Drama by Robert Bierman
1998	The Sweet Life – a Fellini tribute	Ruby	Drama by Nick Hugh McCann
2013	Stray	Stick Woman	Short by David Stewart
2018	The Image	Madam	Drama by Paul Kindersley

== Theatre ==
Year	Production	Role	Location	Notes
1990	Sophie! The Last Of The Red Hot Mamas	Sophie Tucker	New End Theatre, Hampstead, London	Musical by Chris Salt
