= Tony Muréna =

Italian composer

Tony Muréna (1917 – 1970) was an Italian-born Musette accordionist and jazz composer who lived and worked in France.

== Life and career ==
Antonio Muréna was born in Borgo Val di Taro, Italy. His family emigrated to France in 1923 and settled in Nogent-sur-Marne. His uncle gave him his first accordion and he began a performing career assisted by his cousin Louis Ferrari. Muréna played in cabarets and music halls from an early age.

In 1932 Muréna began to play the bandoneón in tango orchestras, including that of Rafael and Eduardo Bianco Canaro, at French clubs including La Boule Noire, Java, The Silhouette, Balajo (rue de Lappe), Pré Catelan and Ciro's. He also toured in South America, Germany, Italy and Switzerland. In 1949 he bought the Le Mirliton cabaret where he often played with Stephane Grappelli and Django Reinhardt. He also played with Matelo Ferret, Henri Crolla, Didi Duprat, Jo Privat and Gus Viseur. In 1958 he established the Radio Luxembourg Orchestra and also hosted the 36 Candles television show. He died in France.

== Works ==
Muréna composed works including:

- Passion
- Indifference (1942, co-written with Joseph Colombo)
- Jockey Club
- Ping Pong

== Singles ==
- - 1957 Que Sera Sera/Les Ames Fières/La Marie-vison/La Complainte de DMackie (Odeon Records, SOE 3159)
- - 1957 Toi, c'est Vrai/Rio de Janeiro/Pour Toi/Je Ne Peux Que T'aimer (Odeon Records, 7 SOE 3169)
- - La Paloma/Adios Pampa Mia (Polydor, 66 723)
- - Adios Pampa Mia/Julio (AFA, NEC 614)
- - Alma Andaluza/Pensamiento (Odeon Records, 282.108)
- - La Plus Belle Chose au Monde/Je t'appellerai/Le Forgeron de Calvi/Prends du Bon Temps (Odeon Records, SOE 3142)
- - Senor Coronas/Paris mon Paname/Sentimental Musette/Capricio Tanco (AFA, NEC 10 518)
- - A Chi Chi Castenango/Tes Yeux Bleus (Odeon Records, 282.026)

== Albums ==
- - 1953 - Tony Muréna Vous Invite À Danser sur des Airs Populaires Italiens (Odeon Records, OS 1011)
- - 1965 - Reine de Musette (Barclay, 820159)
- - 1992 - Valse et swing (Silex, Y225103)
- - 2001 - Les Années Odéon (ILD, ILD 642196/7)
- - 2004 - Fête Musette (Universal, 065 131–2)
- - Tony Murena (AFA, 5019 DA 7)
- - Pleins Feux sur... Tony Murena (AFA, NEC 20709)
- - Accordeon de Vienne (Barclay, 820 016–1)
- - Le Dénicheur avec Tony Muréna (AFA, NEC 20709)
- - Reine de Musette (AFA, 20755)
- - Invitation au Musette - Valses musette et javas par Tony Murena (CBS, 52 017)
- - "Ça gaze..." (Polydor, 658143)
- - De Madrid à Sevilla (Barclay, BL 415)
- - Paris * Lisboa... (Vene Vox, BL-418)
- - Tony Muréna... Un Mauvais Garcon? (AFA, 20 721)
- - Accordéon Swing Vol. 2 (Forlane, UCD 19131)
- - Le Dénicheur (Mr. Pickwick, MPD 231 - compilation)
- - Tony Muréna en pleine forme!... (AFA, 20720)

== Compilations ==
- - 1957 - Les quatre As du Musette (Disques Festival, FLD 26) with André Verchuren, Louis Ledrich, Louis Ferrari.
- - 1963 - Tangos et Paso-Dobles (Odeon Records, XOC 1022) with Jo Privat.
- - 1974 - Paris Musette (Barclay, 80.907 / 908) with Marcel Azzola, Claude Chevalier, Gus Viseur.
- - 1996 - Swing de Musette (Iris Musique Production, IMP 047) with Gus Viseur, Émile Carrara, Guerino, Médard Ferrero.
- - 2005 - Accordéon (Habana, 200 525) with the song Jalousie.
- - 19 Accodéonistes Vous Invitent (Socadisc France, 870017-SC 817) with the pieces El Paso Rojo, Accordéon Espagnol, Reine de Musette.
