= Ferret (disambiguation) =

A ferret is a domesticated animal.

Ferret may also refer to:

== Animals ==
- Black-footed ferret, a wild animal from North America

== Entertainment and media ==
- Ferret (comics), a Timely Comics character
- The Ferret (film), a 1950 French film
- The Ferret (website), investigative journalism website
- The Ferret (TV series), a Welsh consumer affairs programme
- Ferret Music, an American record label
- The Ferrets (band), an Australian pop/rock band
- Matelo Ferret (1918–1989), gypsy jazz guitarist and composer
- Sarane Ferret (1912–1970), gypsy jazz guitarist and composer
- Baro Ferret (1908–1978), gypsy jazz guitarist and composer

== Military ==
- Fairey Ferret, a British biplane
- Ferret armoured car, a British-produced fighting vehicle
- HMS Ferret, the name of a number of ships and shore establishments of the Royal Navy
- Ferret mission, electronic reconnaissance by military aircraft

== Places ==
- Val Ferret, a valley on the Swiss side of the Mont Blanc Massif
- Cap Ferret, a headland on France's Atlantic coast

== See also ==
- Féret (disambiguation)
- Ferrette, a commune in north-eastern France
