= René Didi Duprat =

French musician (1926–1996)

René Didi Duprat (12 October 1926 – 8 August 1996) was a French jazz manouche guitarist.

== Life and career ==
Didi Duprat was born in Paris and learned to play mandolin, guitar and banjo as a child. Duprat was left-handed and, influenced by Django Reinhardt, began to play Gypsy jazz guitar, although not a Gypsy by heritage. In 1936 he began playing with the Michel Warlop Orchestra. In 1943 he worked with accordion player Gus Viseur, and until 1952 he played with the Louis Ferrari Orchestra. In 1958 he toured with Yves Montand, and later with the Ferret brothers, Tony Muréna, Juliette Gréco, Dalida and Marlene Dietrich. He made a number of recordings in the 1930s and 1940s.

== Discography ==
Selected recordings include:

- La Lichére
- Vent d’Automne
- Various Artists Paris Musette Vol. 1, 2 & 3
- The French Quintet
