= Ferret Brothers =

The Ferret Brothers may refer to:

- Pierre Ferret (1908–1978), Jean Ferret and Etienne Ferret, French jazz musicians
- Robear and Robert, fictional animal characters from the Iggy Arbuckle show voiced by Patrick McKenna and Neil Crone
