= Under Paris Skies =

Studio album by Andy Williams
- Released: 1960
- Recorded: June 1960
- Studio: Barclay Studios, Paris
- Genre: traditional pop; standards
- Length: 35:03
- Label: Cadence

Andy Williams chronology
The Village of St. Bernadette (1960)	Under Paris Skies (1960)	Andy Williams' Best (1961)

Under Paris Skies is the seventh studio album by American pop singer Andy Williams and was released in the fall of 1960 by Cadence Records. This, his final LP for the label, is a collection of songs that Joseph Laredo describes in the liner notes of the CD release by Varèse Sarabande as "a delightful program of twelve compositions, selected by Williams, that proved an engaging mixture of genuine French popular songs and American-penned emulations."

The title song "bubbled under" the Hot 100 in Billboard magazine for two weeks that began in the issue of the magazine dated August 8, 1964, and took it to number 121.

The album was released on compact disc in 1997 after being digitally remastered by Varèse Sarabande. It was also released as one of two albums on one CD by Collectables Records on September 12, 2000, the other album being a 1962 Cadence compilation entitled Andy Williams' Best. Collectables included this CD in a box set entitled Classic Album Collection, Vol. 1, which contains 17 of his studio albums and three compilations and was released on June 26, 2001. Under Paris Skies was included in a box set entitled Eight Classic Albums Box Set, which contains 7 of his studio albums, 1 compilation, and was released on November 9, 2012.

== Production ==
Although no album producer credit is listed on any of its releases, Laredo writes, "Unlike his previous Cadence efforts, which were meticulously supervised by label owner Archie Bleyer, Under Paris Skies was a pet project for which Williams assumed the producer's responsibilities."

The album was recorded in Paris, and Quincy Jones led an orchestra of both American and French musicians in the studio. In the liner notes from the original album, jazz critic Nat Hentoff quotes the description of the recording of the album that Williams gave. "Our first session was for 9:00 p.m., and I was all set to record. At 9:30 some musicians were still arriving. After about an hour, we had finished one song. The sound was wonderful, and I was very happy. At this point, I was informed that the orchestra has to have a 15 minute break. The musicians vanished to a local café for some wine. About 45 minutes later, they began arriving back in the studio. We got one more song recorded before the contractor stood up and, in perfect English, said, 'Overtime'. Overtime is expensive in Paris, and so we released the orchestra for half an hour and started another three-hour session at 12:30. The musicians naturally returned to their café and their wine, and showed up for the second session about 1:00 a.m., happy and very friendly." Laredo adds that the "French musicians were paid on the honor system. Unfamiliar with local routine, Andy simply hauled a suitcase of francs into the studio and invited each man to take his fair share."

== Reception ==
Professional ratings
Review scores
Source	Rating
Allmusic	3/5 stars
The Billboard	4/5 stars
New Record Mirror	4/5 stars
The Encyclopedia of Popular Music	3/5 stars
Disc	4/5 stars

In his review of the album for AllMusic, Cub Koda described it as "a sumptuous package, full of beautiful arrangements that perfectly frame Williams' pop croonings." He concluded that it was "one of the most lush-sounding Andy Williams albums in his vast catalog."

Billboard also gave it a good review. "Williams offers his usual tasteful vocal stylings--both in English and French--on a group of nostalgic Parisian-flavored oldies and standards with fine backing by Quincy Jones." Cashbox notes that "the album displays the graceful swinging atmosphere of the Williams manner."

New Record Mirror described it being "A nicely balanced song selection and some great arrangements, swinging and otherwise." Nigel Hunter of Disc notes Williams "treats these familiar songs of the French capital with unfailing respect and more than a little originality."

== Track listing ==
=== Side one ===
1. "Under Paris Skies" (Jean Andre Brun, Kim Gannon, Hubert Giraud) - 3:03
2. "Let It Be Me" (Gilbert Becaud, Mann Curtis, Pierre Delanoë) - 3:24
3. "April in Paris" (Vernon Duke, E.Y. "Yip" Harburg) - 3:38
4. "Mademoiselle de Paris" (Henri Contet, Paul Durand, Eric Maschwitz, Mitchell Parish) - 2:52
5. "I Wish You Love" (Albert A. Beach, Charles Trenet) - 3:44
6. "Domino" (Louis Ferrari; Jacques Plante; Don Raye) - 2:07

=== Side two ===
1. "I Love Paris" (Cole Porter) - 2:50
2. "Mam'selle" (Mack Gordon, Edmund Goulding) - 3:33
3. "Comme Ci, Comme Ça" (Bruno Coquatrix, Pierre Dudan, Alex Kramer, Joan Whitney) - 2:14
4. "La Valse des Lilas" (Eddie Barclay, Michel Legrand, Eddy Marnay, Johnny Mercer) - 2:39
5. "Boum!" (E. Ray Goetz, Charles Trenet) - 2:28
6. "Au Revoir, Paris" (Kay Thompson) - 2:41

== Personnel ==
=== Original album ===
- Andy Williams - vocalist
- Dave Grusin - pianist
- Quincy Jones - orchestra conductor
- Billy Byers - arranger
- Frank Gauna - cover design
- Jean-Pierre Leloir - photographer
- Nat Hentoff - liner notes

=== Varèse Sarabande reissue ===
- Cary Mansfield - producer
- Marty Wekser - sound producer
- Paul Elmore - digital remastering
- Joseph F. Laredo - liner notes
- Top Design Studio, Los Angeles - design

== Bibliography ==
- Whitburn, Joel (2009), Joel Whitburn's Top Pop Singles, 1955-2008, Record Research Inc., ISBN 0-89820-180-2
