= Lulu Reinhardt =

French gypsy jazz guitarist (1951–2014)

- Lulu Reinhardt (seated, centre) with the Lulu Reinhardt-Dodi Schumacher Ensemble, from the front cover of their 1982 album "Gypsy-Swing"

Background information
- Born: Lulu Reinhardt; 17 August 1951
- Origin: Forbach, France
- Died: 10 February 2014 (aged 62)
- Genres: gypsy jazz
- Occupations: Guitarist, composer
- Instrument: Guitar
- Years active: 1975–2014

Lulu Reinhardt (17 August 1951 – 10 February 2014) (first name spelled Loulou on the first album on which he played) was a French gypsy jazz guitarist in the tradition of Django Reinhardt. He performed lead/joint lead guitar duties with the groups Romanesj, the Häns'che Weiss Quintett, the Titi Winterstein Quintet, and subsequently with Dodi Schumacher, Rigo Winterstein and Peter Petrel. He is considered an archetypal figure in the 1970s German gypsy jazz school. (Note: Where not attributed elsewhere, some of the text in this article is translated, with minor edits, from the entry for Lulu Reinhardt on German Wikipedia at https://de.wikipedia.org/wiki/Lulu_Reinhardt.)

== Biography ==
Reinhardt grew up in a Manouche community, first in his birthplace Forbach (a town in France on the French-German border), then in Verviers, Belgium. He received his first lessons from his father Noto, initially based on the style of Django Reinhardt. He made his first appearances at the age of twelve. From the early 1970s, the Reinhardt family resided in the Eifel area of Germany, near Euskirchen. His first recordings were made with the Ensemble Romanesj, with Haentsje and Bakro Rosenberg. In 1976 he became a member of the gypsy jazz Quintet of Häns'che Weiss and the following year took part in a tour with Weiss with Stéphane Grappelli. From 1978 he played in the quintet of Titi Winterstein. He formed a group with the saxophonist Dodi Schumacher and then headed a swingtett with Rigo Winterstein that was active for two decades and released several albums. Then he performed with Peter Petrel and his Gypsy Swingtett. Reinhardt also wrote a number of compositions such as "Lulu Swing", "Noto Swing" and "Valse à Madame" (with Rigo Winterstein). In the field of jazz he was involved in eleven recording sessions between 1975 and 1987.

In his obituary, Django Station describes Lulu Reinhardt with his technically virtuoso playing as the protagonist of the "German school" of gypsy jazz guitar, which is characterized by aggressive attack, rolling chords ("roulement d'accords"), rhythmic placement and virtuosity.

Lulu Reinhardt is not to be confused with the German guitarist Lulo Reinhardt (b. 1961).

== Discography ==
- Romanesj (with Bakaro Rosenberg & Häntsje Rosenberg): Amaro Djipe 2 - 1975
- Häns'che Weiss Quintett - Fünf Jahre Musik Deutscher Zigeuner - 1977
- Titi Winterstein Quintett: Saitenstraßen - 1978
- Titi Winterstein Quintett: I Raisa - 1980
- with Dodi Schumacher: Live 1980 - 1980 (presumed)
- Lulu Reinhardt-Dodi Schumacher Ensemble: Gypsy-Swing - 1982
- Titi Winterstein Quintett: Djinee Tu Kowa Ziro - 1985
- Titi Winterstein Quintett: Live Mit Vanessa & Sorba - 1987
- Titi Winterstein Quintett: Maro Djipen - 1994
- with Rigo Winterstein: King of the gypsies - 1997
- with Rigo Winterstein: Live Konzer Athen (date unknown)
- Titi Winterstein Quintett: Star portrait - 1999
- with Rigo Winterstein: Swing Legenden of Gibsy Jazz - 2007
- with Rigo Winterstein: Lulus Swing - 2012
- ?cassette, date not known: We Meet Again
