= Dotschy Reinhardt =

German Jazz musician, author and human rights activist, born 1975

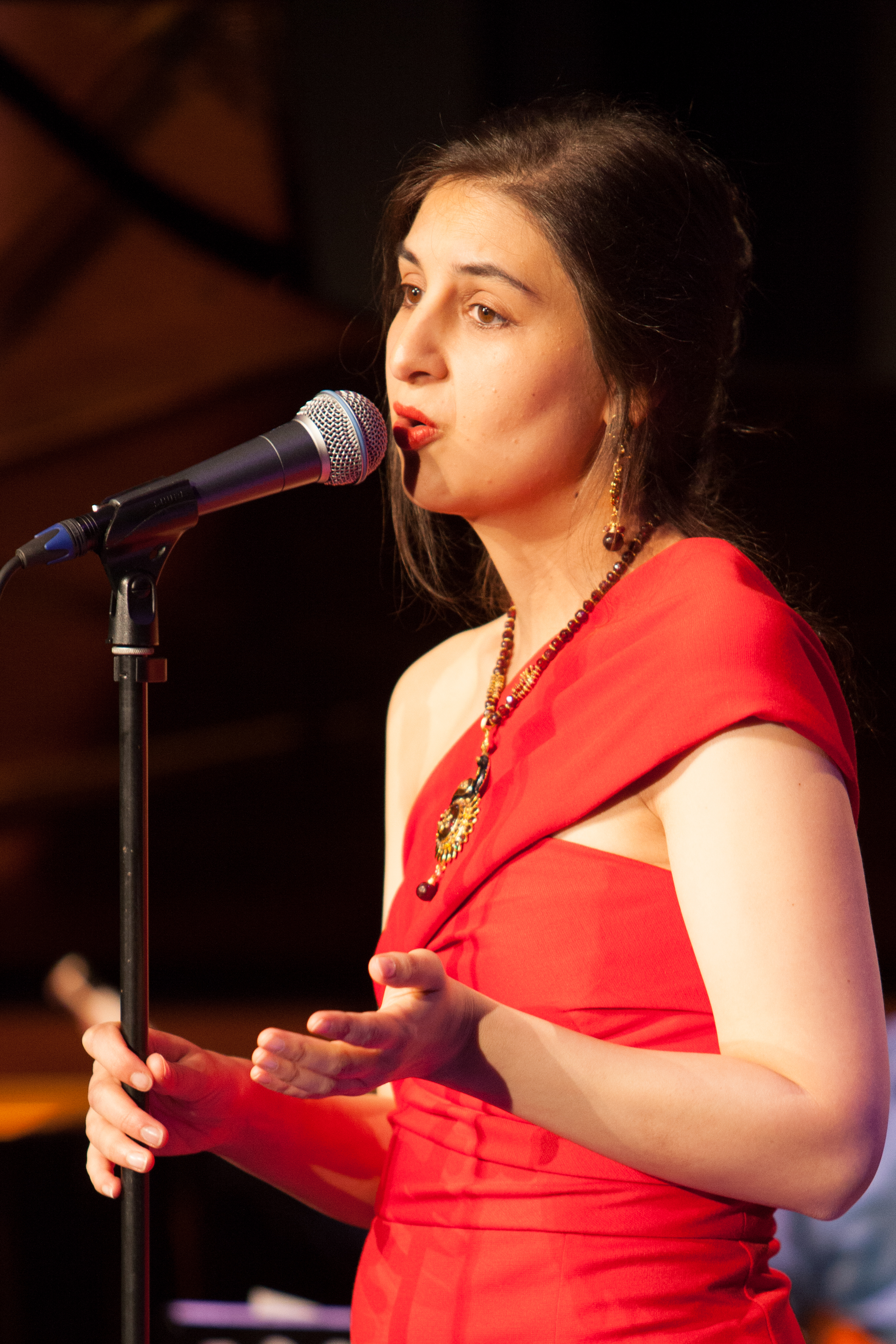

Background information
- Born: November 10, 1975 (age 50); Ravensburg, Germany
- Genres: contemporary jazz, Brazilian jazz
- Occupations: singer, songwriter, composer,
- Instrument: vocal
- Years active: 1990 - present
- Website: Official webpage

Dotschy Reinhardt (born 10 November 1975 as Michaela Reinhardt) is a German jazz musician, author and human rights activist. Apart from her live performances and music albums, she is known for her publications about Romani culture and as activist for ethnic diversity and the rights of Romani people in Germany.

== Life and career ==
=== Early years and education ===
Born as Michaela Reinhardt in Ravensburg in Southern Germany, she is a Sinteza of the extended Reinhardt family and began singing at the age of four. Accompanied by her uncle jazz guitarist and co-founder of the Schnuckenack Reinhardt Quartet Bobby Falta, she began singing standards from the Great American Songbook and got to know the music of her famous relative Django Reinhardt. She begann singing spirituals in church services, both in German and in Romanes, the language of the Sinti people. Later, she started taking music lessons in singing and playing the organ and worked part-time in a record shop.

Reinhardt had her first public appearances at the age of eleven, taking part in the monthly shows of Swing jazz with pianist Horst Jankowski in Stuttgart. At the age of 15 she appeared in the TV show “Swing & Talk” with the RIAS Jazz Orchestra also led by Jankowski.

=== Career as singer, writer and activist ===
Reinhardt sings her songs mainly in English and Romanes. Since her early years, she has been influenced by the music of Frank Sinatra, Julie London, Ella Fitzgerald and Django Reinhardt. For the latter's compositions Nuages and Minor Swing, she wrote her own lyrics. Apart from her interpretations of jazz standards, Brazilian and Gypsy jazz, she has published her own original compositions. Referring to her identity as Sinti woman, she wrote in one of her songs: “You believe what others say, you deny your life as a Sinto, you live their life, bear their name, lose your identity.”

In 2006 she released her debut album Sprinkled Eyes, developing so-called Gypsy jazz towards contemporary jazz and Bossa nova. Her second album Suni received positive reviews for its stylistic diversity. The third album Pani Sindhu, where she included references to the origins of Romani people, has been called a "coherent, cleverly composed concept album."

In 2008, Reinhardt published her first book whose German title translates as Gypsy: The Story of a Large Sinti Family, telling the story of her family. Her second book Everybody's Gypsy: Pop Culture Between Exclusion and Respect was published in 2014. There, Reinhardt wrote on common notions and stereotypes about Romani people. She further explained, how Sinti and Roma have been fighting against social exclusion and the appropriation of their culture. Illustrating these complex notions, she used stories about music and fashion, literature and art, film, television and everyday life. Her other publications until 2022 have been a foreword to an anthology of modern Sinti poetry, an illustrated biography in Romani of Django Reinhard and a study of the Sinti and Romani people in Berlin.

Since 2003 Reinhardt has lived in Berlin with her husband, jazz singer David Rose. In 2016 she became chairwoman of the State Council of Roma and Sinti RomnoKher in Berlin-Brandenburg. She has appeared in public events for the commemoration of the genocide of Jewish and Romani people during Nazi rule.

== Publications ==
- Gypsy. Die Geschichte einer großen Sinti Familie. Frankfurt am Main: Scherz-Verlag, 2008
- Everybody's Gypsy. Popkultur zwischen Ausgrenzung und Respekt. Berlin: Metrolit Verlag 2014
- Foreword, in: Die Morgendämmerung der Worte. Moderner Poesie-Atlas der Roma und Sinti. Berlin: Verlag Die Andere Bibliothek 2018.
- Django Reinhardt: Malebasgro livro. Dokumentations- und Kulturzentrum Deutscher Sinti und Roma. 2020.
- Sinti und Roma in Berlin: 27 Fragen und Antworten. Berlin: Berliner Landeszentrale für politische Bildung, 2022

== Discography ==
- Sprinkled Eyes (2006)
- Suni (2008)
- Pani Sindhu (2012)
- Chaplin's Secret (2018)
