= Tracteur Jack =

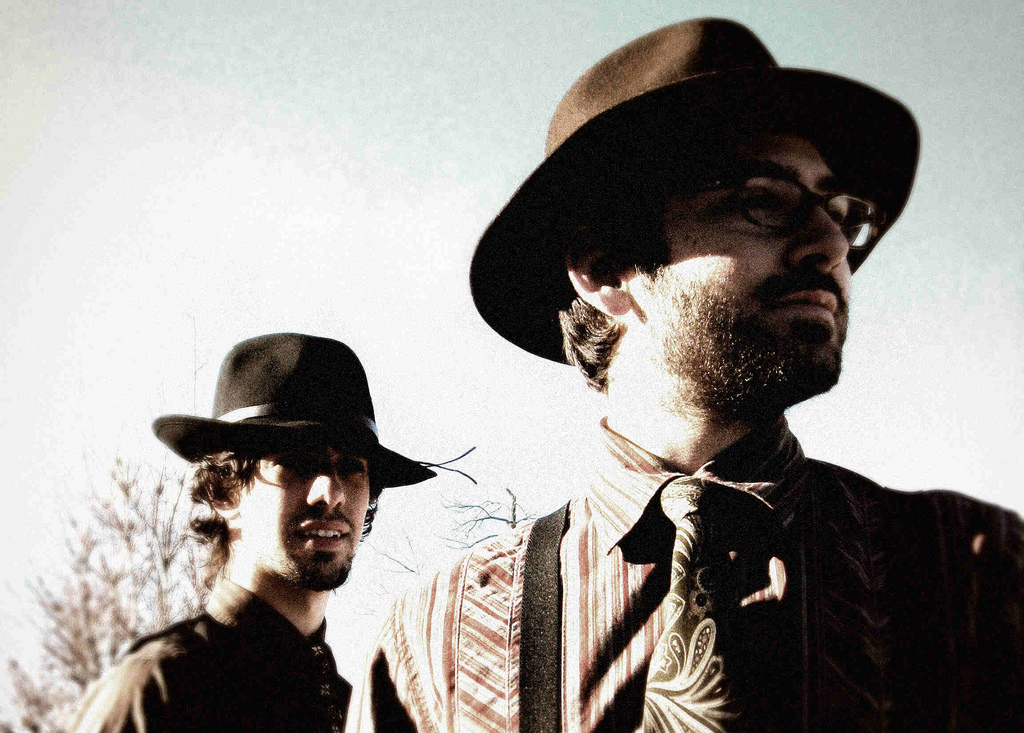
- Ottawa, January 2008

Background information
- Origin: Gatineau, Quebec, Canada
- Genres: French pop Spaghetti Rock
- Years active: 2003–2012
- Labels: Unsigned
- Members: Dominic Faucher; François Leblanc; Julien Morissette; Thierry Faucher
- Website: Tracteur Jack's official website

Tracteur Jack is a Canadian rock band from Gatineau, Quebec. The two principal members reside in Gatineau and Quebec City. Their cynical and humorous québécois songwriting combines social commentary with cinematographic "soundtrack" music rooted in gypsy jazz, rockabilly, French pop and classic rock. containing social commentary and vivid imagery.

Tracteur Jack performed high-energy stage shows with minimal instrumentation. The band members produce and mix their own recordings, with the occasional exception of mastering.

== History ==
Tracteur Jack formed when Dominic Faucher and François Leblanc joined forces in 2003 in order to compete in the provincial talent contest "Cégeps en Spectacle", where they won both the jury's and public vote's prizes in Hull, 2004. Two years later the duo was expanded to four members.

In 2011, the band released a self-produced album, Western Camembert. That year they were nominated for a Quebec Indie Music Award and participated in Les Francouvertes de Montréal. They also performed at the Les Francofolies de Montréal.

The band later released a mini-album, Paris-Roberval; they also recorded a song praising the Tim Hortons fast-food restaurant chain.

Tracteur Jack disbanded in 2012, shortly after performing at the Festival Outaouais Émergent.

== Line-up ==
- Dominic Faucher (vocals, acoustic rhythm guitar)
- François Leblanc (lead electric guitar, vocals)
- Julien Morissette (double bass, vocals)
- Thierry Faucher (drums)

== Discography ==
- La Maquette 2008 (2008)
- Yellow Crab Tour 2009 (2009)
- Western Camembert 2011 (2011)

== Videography ==
- "Petit Paul" (2007), produced and animated by Ariane Meilleur.

== See also ==
- List of bands from Canada
