= Fere =

Fere is a surname. Notable people with the surname include:

- Aurelia Litsner De Fere (ca. 1835 –1917), Hungarian musician and voice-trainer
- Cemre Fere (born 1994), Turkish badminton player
- Vladimir Fere (1902 – 1971), Russian composer

== See also ==
- Feres (disambiguation)
- Feret (disambiguation)
