= Les doigts de l'homme =

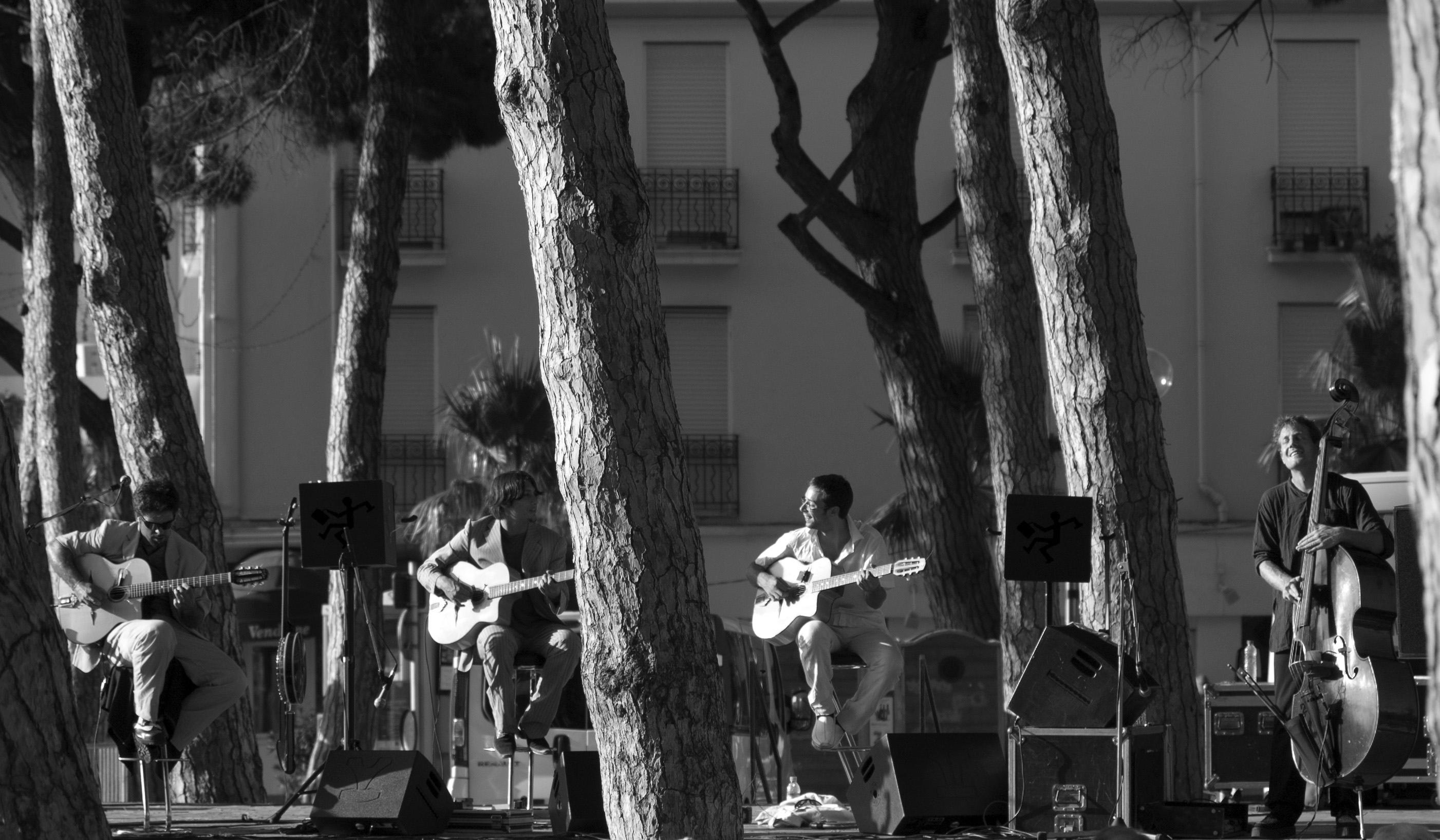

Background information
- Genres: Gypsy jazz
- Years active: 2003–present
- Labels: Coop Breizh, Lamastrock, Plume, Alma Records
- Website: www.lesdoigtsdelhomme.com

Les doigts de l'homme is a French gypsy jazz-inspired hot club jazz band.

== History ==
Formed in 2003, the group's fourth full-length album, 1910, was the first to be distributed in North America.

== Members ==
- Olivier Kikteff
- Tanguy Blum
- Yannick Alcocer
- Benoit Convert
- Antoine Girard

== Influences ==
The band is heavily influenced by the work of Django Reinhardt, and their album 1910 is named after the year of his birth.

== Albums ==
- Dans le monde (2003)
- Gipsy jazz nucléaire (2004)
- Les Doigts de l'homme (2005)
- Les Doigts dans la prise (2008)
- 1910 (2010)
- Mumbo Jumbo (2013)
- Le coeur des vivants (2017)
- Erratic, the art of roaming (2024)
