= Feres =

Feres may refer to:

- Feres, Evros, a town in the Evros regional unit, Greece
- Feres, Magnesia, a town in Magnesia, Greece
- Bia and Branca Feres (born 1988), Brazilian synchronized swimmers, models, actresses and identical twins
- María Ester Feres (1943 – 2021) was a Chilean politician and lawyer

== See also ==
- Feres doctrine - see Feres v. United States
- Fere
