= Foreign Body (1986 film) =

- Directed by: Ronald Neame
- Screenplay by: Celine La Freniere
- Based on: Foreign Body by Roderick Mann
- Produced by: Colin M. Brewer
- Starring: Victor Banerjee; Trevor Howard; Warren Mitchell; Geraldine McEwan; Denis Quilley; Amanda Donohoe; Eve Ferret; Anna Massey; Stratford Johns
- Cinematography: Ronnie Taylor
- Edited by: Andrew Nelson
- Music by: Ken Howard
- Distributed by: Rank Film Distributors
- Release date: 26 September 1986
- Running time: 111 minutes
- Country: United Kingdom
- Language: English

Foreign Body is a 1986 British romantic comedy film directed by Ronald Neame and adapted from the 1975 Roderick Mann novel of the same name. The film stars Victor Banerjee, Warren Mitchell, Denis Quilley, and Amanda Donohoe. It was Neame's final film.

== Plot ==
Banerjee stars as Ram Das, a jobless Indian man who, tired of life in mid-1970s Calcutta, steals money from his father in order to afford a passage to Britain and while there, falls in love with a white woman.

== Cast ==
- Victor Banerjee as Ram Das
- Geraldine McEwan as Lady Ammanford
- Warren Mitchell as I.Q. Patel
- Denis Quilley as Prime Minister
- Amanda Donohoe as Susan Partridge
- Eve Ferret as Norah
- Anna Massey as Miss Furze
- Stratford Johns as Mr. Plumb
- Trevor Howard as Dr. Stirry
- Jane Laurie as Jo Masters (as Janet Laurie)
- Rashid Karapiet as Mr. Nahan
- Sinitta Renay as Indian girl
- Marc Zuber as Macho escort
- Janet Henfrey as Landlady
- Ann Firbank as Mrs. Plumb
- Richard Wilson as Colonel Partridge
- Timothy Bateson as Agent at Harley Street

== Reception ==
Walter Goodman of The New York Times didn't give the film a good review stating:

The occasional sharp line in Celine La Freniere's screenplay points up the general dullness of the plot, which originated in a novel by Roderick Mann. It is a collection of passingly amusing incidents without a strong connecting line or a consistent tone. Little happens to keep us wondering what will happen next. The burden falls on Mr. Banerjee, and it proves too much even for so engaging an actor.
