= Boulou Ferré =

French jazz guitarist and composer

- Born: Jean-Jacques Ferret; 24 April 1951 (age 74); Paris, France
- Genres: Gypsy jazz, classical
- Occupation: Musician
- Instrument: Guitar
- Labels: Barclay, SteepleChase
- Website: www.boulou-elios-ferre.com

Boulou Ferré (born Jean-Jacques Ferret, 24 April 1951) is a French virtuoso jazz guitarist, composer, arranger, and improviser. He is the brother of Elios Ferré, also a jazz musician, with whom he has recorded widely. His repertoire includes jazz and classical music. He is considered one of the greatest contemporary musicians of the manouche (gypsy jazz) tradition and has contributed to the genre through his knowledge of both jazz and classical music and his interest in the contrapuntal music of J. S. Bach.

== Music career ==
Boulou Ferré was born in Paris and came from a family of musicians. His father, Matelo Ferret, and his uncle, Baro Ferret, played with Django Reinhardt in the Quintet of the Hot Club of France. His brother, Elios Ferré, is also a guitarist. By the age of seven, he was playing solos by saxophonist Charlie Parker on guitar. When he was eight, he gave his first concert, and when he was twelve he recorded his debut album.

In 1962 Ferré enrolled at the Conservatoire de Paris, taking classes in piano, classical guitar, and organ, the latter under Olivier Messiaen. Messian was formative in Ferré's approach to classical music, counterpoint, and J. S. Bach, whose music has influenced his approach to composition. After the Conservatore, he became an organist at a Paris cathedral and developed his style of jazz improvisation and composition.

When he was 13, Ferré played with John Coltrane at the Jazz à Juan festival in Antibes. In 1966 he recorded the album Paris All-Stars with Michel Gaudry, Maurice Vander, and Eddy Louiss. In 1969 he gave a series of recitals at the Chat qui peche Jazz Club with saxophonist Dexter Gordon, bassist Patrice Caratini, and drummer Philly Joe Jones. In the 1970s he recorded and played with Bob Reid, Chet Baker, Steve Lacy, Gunter Hampel, Kenny Clarke, Warne Marsh, Svend Asmussen, and Louis Vola.

In 1974 Ferré formed the Corporation Gypsy Orchestra with Steve Potts, Christian Escoudé, and pianist Takashi Kako. The group recorded for SteepleChase in 1979. He formed Trio Gitan with Escoudé and Babik Reinhardt and in 1988 with Philippe Combelle.

He formed a duo with his brother Elio in 1978 under the name Ferré instead of Ferret.

On 10 April 2012, Boulou was made Chevalier des Arts et des Lettres by Frédéric Mitterrand, French Minister of Culture.

In 2015, Boulou Ferré, Elios Ferré and Christophe Astolfi recorded the album La Bande des trois (When jazz meets French song), released in September 2015 by Label Ouest (L'Autre distribution ).

== Discography ==
- The 13 Year Old Sensation from France (4 Corners of the World, 1965)
- Boulou et Les Paris All Stars (Barclay, 1966)
- Espace with Gunter Hampel (Birth, 1970)
- Pour Django with Elios Ferré (SteepleChase, 1979)
- Gypsy Dreams with Elios Ferré (SteepleChase, 1980)
- Trinity with Niels-Henning Ørsted Pedersen, Elios Ferre (SteepleChase, 1983)
- Three of a Kind with Christian Escoude, Babik Reinhardt (JMS, 1985)
- Nuages with Elios Ferre, Jesper Lundgaard (SteepleChase, 1986)
- Relax and Enjoy (SteepleChase, 1987)
- Confirmation (SteepleChase, 1989)
- Guitar Legacy (SteepleChase, 1991)
- New York, New York (SteepleChase, 1997)
- Intersection with Elios Ferré, Alain Jean-Marie (La Lichere, 2002)
- The Rainbow of Life (Bee Jazz, 2003)
- Shades of a Dream (Bee Jazz, 2004)
- Parisian Passion (Bee Jazz, 2005)
- Live in Montpellier with Elios Ferre (Le Chant Du Monde, 2007)
- Brothers to Brothers with Elios Ferre (Plus Loin, 2008)
- Django 100 (JMS, 2009)
- Solo (JMS, 2013)
- La Bande Des Trois with Elios Ferre (Label Ouest, 2015)
