= Domino (Louis Ferrari and Don Raye song) =

"Domino" is a popular song written in 1950, with music by Louis Ferrari. The original French lyrics were written by Jacques Plante, and English lyrics were supplied by Don Raye.

== History ==
A big hit in France and all of Europe, "Domino" was introduced by the popular French singer André Claveau. It was also recorded by Patachou, Lucienne Delyle and many others. Hit records of the English-language version were made by Tony Martin and by Bing Crosby. The song was also recorded by Doris Day, Jane Morgan, and by Teddy Johnson.

The recording by Tony Martin with Henri René and His Orchestra was made in Hollywood on October 2, 1951. It was released by RCA Victor Records as catalog number 20-4343A (in USA) and by EMI on the His Master's Voice label as catalog number B 10167. It first reached the Billboard Best Seller chart on October 26, 1951, and lasted 12 weeks on the chart, peaking at number 9.

The recording by Bing Crosby was cut on October 4, 1951 with John Scott Trotter and his Orchestra and released by Decca Records as catalog number 27830. It first reached the Billboard Best Seller chart on October 26, 1951, and lasted six weeks on the chart, peaking at number 15.

Semprini with Rhythm accompaniment recorded it in London on January 25, 1952, as the third melody of the medley "Dancing to the piano (No. 12) - Part 1. Hit Medley of Waltzes" along with "We Won't Live in a Castle" and "While We're Young". It was released by EMI on the His Master's Voice label as catalog number B 10231. Andy Williams released a version on his 1960 album, Under Paris Skies.
