= Häns'che Weiss =

- Häns'che Weiss in performance - still from 1977 German TV session

Background information
- Born: Häns'che Weiss; 1951
- Origin: Berlin, Germany
- Died: 2 June 2016 (aged 64–65)
- Genres: jazz, gypsy jazz, bop
- Occupations: Guitarist, composer
- Instrument: Guitar
- Years active: 1960s–2006
- Labels: Da Camera Song, RBM, Electrola, Songbird, Intercord, CC-Records, Elite Special, Salko Productions
- Formerly of: Schnuckenack Reinhardt, Häns'che Weiss Quintett

Häns'che Weiss (1951 – 2 June 2016) was a German gypsy jazz and modern jazz guitarist in the tradition of Django Reinhardt. From 1969-1972 he played with the Schnuckenack Reinhardt Quintett, after which he made five albums with his own ensemble playing acoustic gypsy jazz along with self-composed and traditional gypsy tunes. From the early 80s to his death he played in a more mainstream/bebop jazz style with other German jazz artists including the violinist Martin Weiss (his nephew), and the double bass player Vali Mayer. (Note: Where not attributed elsewhere, some of the text in this article is translated, with minor edits, from the entry for Häns'che Weiss on German wikipedia at https://de.wikipedia.org/wiki/H%C3%A4ns%E2%80%99che_Weiss.)

== Life and work ==
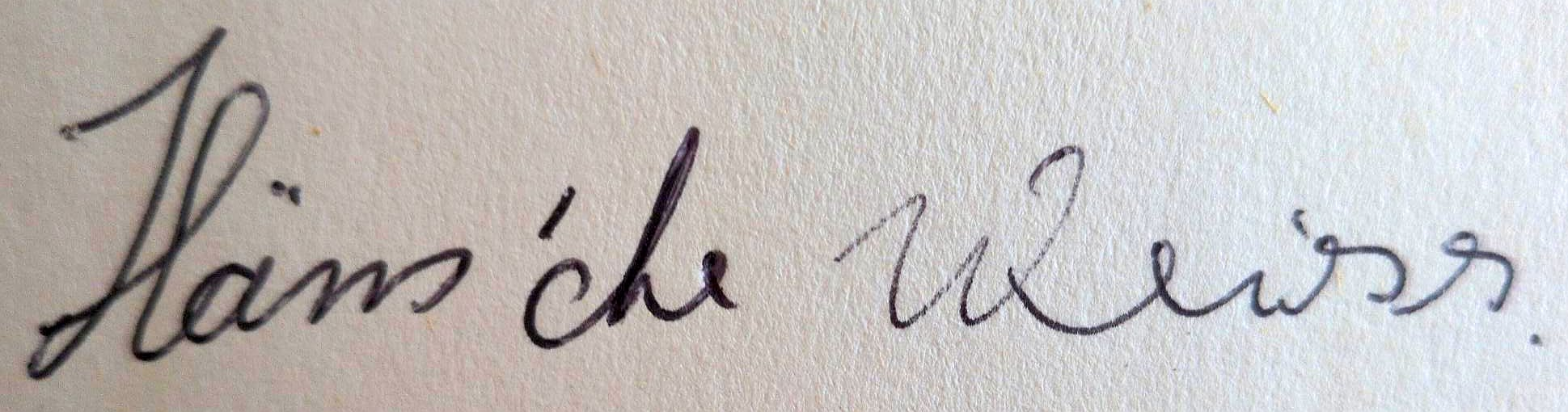
Autograph of the german sinti jazz guitarist Häns'che Weiss

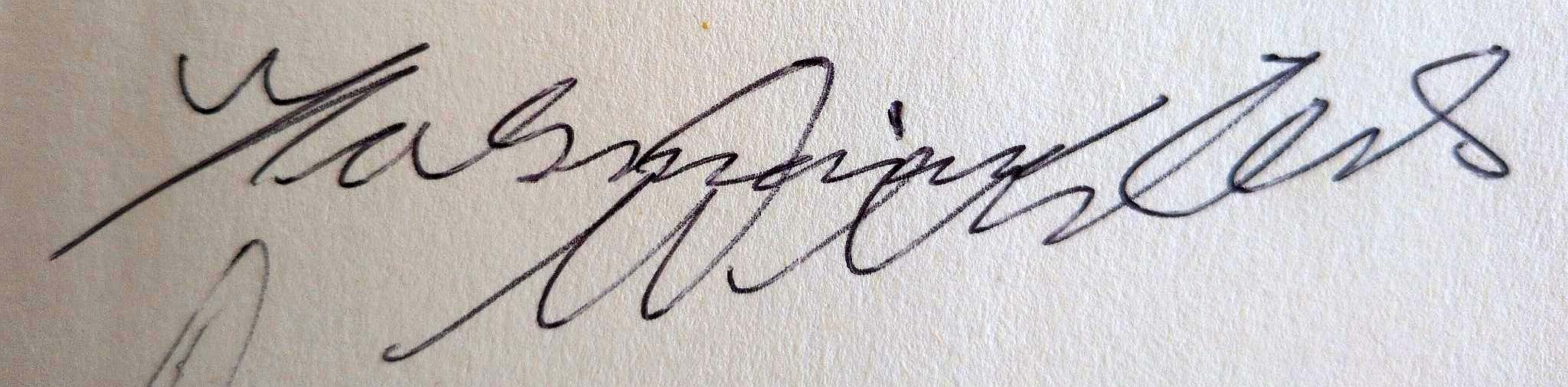
Autograph of the german sinti jazz guitarist Holzmanno Winterstein

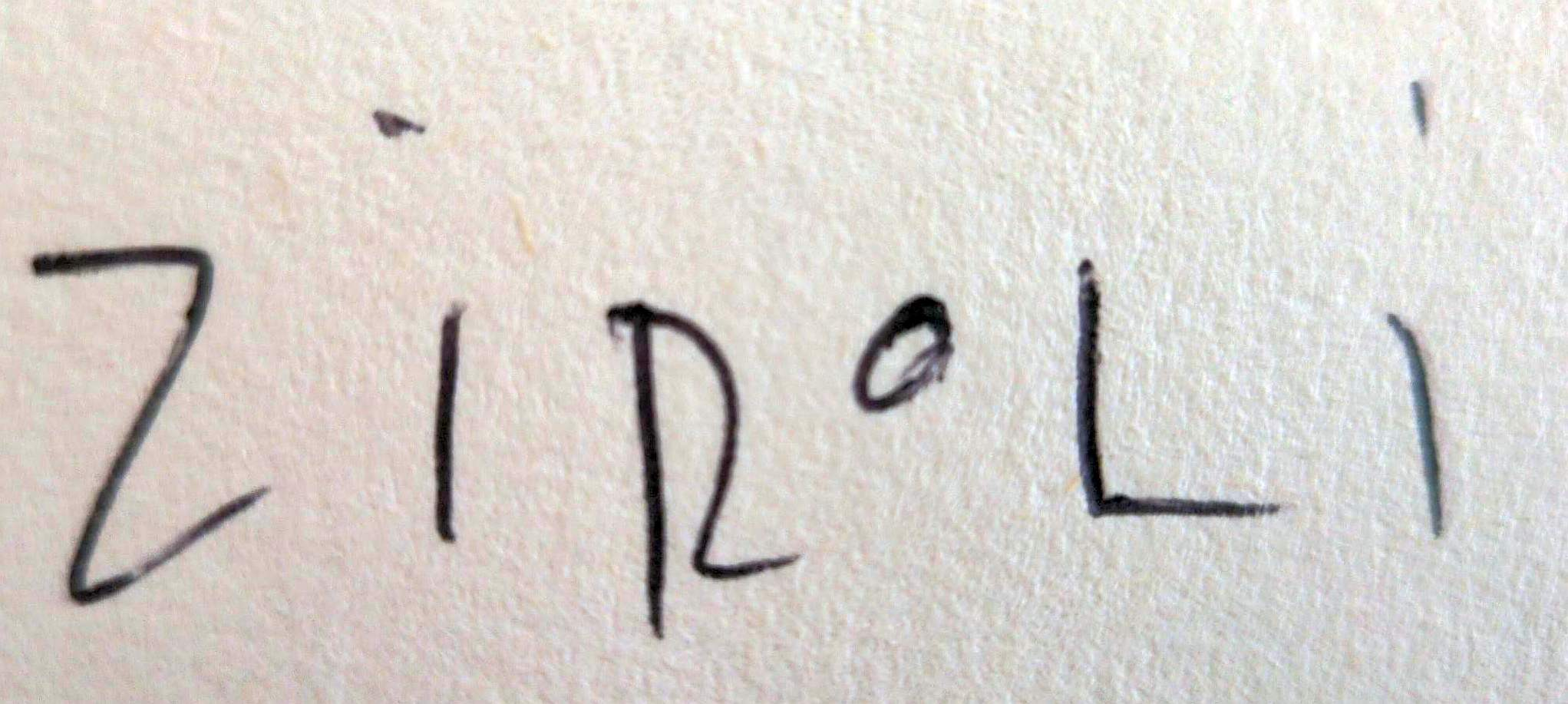
Autograph of the german sinti jazz guitarist Ziroli Winterstein

Weiss was born in 1951 in Berlin to a musical Sinto (German Romani) family, learning to play the guitar from his father Gono who before the second world war had played violin, guitar, accordion and zither. He took up the guitar aged 13, and two years later won the first prize in a young talent competition in Berlin. By the age of 18, he was already an excellent guitarist in the tradition of Django Reinhardt and in December 1969 was picked by Schnuckenack Reinhardt to join his quintet in the role of solo guitarist. Over the succeeding two and a half years he played with this group in Germany, Austria, Switzerland and France and played as solo guitarist on two of the quintet's albums (Musik deutscher Zigeuner 3 and Musik deutscher Zigeuner 4), produced by Siegfried Maeker for the Da Camera Song label.

In September 1972 at age 21, Weiss left Schnuckenack's ensemble to found his own group, the Häns'che Weiss Quintet which drew some of its members from the (old) Schnuckenack Reinhardt Quintet. This new group comprised Häns'che Weiss at the solo guitar, the then 15-year old prodigy Titi Winterstein at the violin, Holzmanno Winterstein and Ziroli Winterstein at the rhythm guitars and Hojok Merstein at the double bass. This line-up travelled to the United Kingdom in 1975 where they played at the prestigious Cambridge Folk Festival. In 1976 Holzmanno Winterstein left the band and was replaced by the excellent guitarist Lulu Reinhardt who played both rhythm and additional lead guitar roles. The Quintet released five albums all produced by Siegfried Maeker: Musik deutscher Zigeuner 5 (1973), for which the ensemble received the Deutscher Schallplattenpreis (German recorded music prize); Musik deutscher Zigeuner 6, Dja Maro Drom (1974) on Electrola, Das Häns'che Weiss Quintett (1975) on Songbird, and Fünf Jahre Musik deutscher Zigeuner (1977) on Intercord. In addition to making powerful music, Weiss and his musicians also made an important commitment to the defense and understanding of the Sinti people and culture.

In the late 1970s the Quintet was dissolved and left to Titi Winterstein to continue. In 1981 Häns'che released the album Couleurs, with a novel lineup including the percussionist Trilok Gurtu and second guitarist Romani Weiss. Subsequently, he formed a trio with his nephew, the young violinist Martin Weiss and bassist Vali Mayer. This line-up released the albums Zugaben... in 1985, Erinnerungen in 1988 and Vis à vis in 1991, with Weiss playing a more modern, bebop style of jazz guitar inspired by his other idols such as Barney Kessel, Wes Montgomery, Joe Pass and Kenny Burrell, also incorporating some influences from bossa nova.

After the departure of Martin Weiss, who then began a solo career, Häns'che Weiss continued to perform as a duet with Vali Mayer, sometimes accompanied by the young pianist Micky Bamberger. This line-up released three albums in a more modern style: Just play, Just play II, The duo: live!, and performed regularly within Germany.

After being ill for some time, Häns'che Weiss died on 2 June 2016. His Django-inspired guitar work played a significant role in the revival of the "hot club" style of gypsy guitar playing from the late 1960s onwards and he is remembered not only for his fine playing and mentoring of younger musicians but also for his cheerful on-stage persona.

== Awards ==
- Deutscher Schallplattenpreis (German Recording prize)

== Discography ==
- with Schnuckenack Reinhardt: Musik deutscher Zigeuner - Schnuckenack Reinhardt Quintett, Vol. 3 (Da Camera Song, LP, released September 1970, recorded 13/14 May 1970; live recording at Heidelberg and Ludwigsburg)
- with Schnuckenack Reinhardt: Musik deutscher Zigeuner - Schnuckenack Reinhardt Quintett, Vol. 4 (Da Camera Song, LP, released April 1972, recorded 29/30 November 1971)
- Musik Deutscher Zigeuner – Häns'che Weiss Quintett, Vol. 5 (Da Camera Song, LP, released März 1973, recorded 26/27/28 September 1972)
- Musik Deutscher Zigeuner – Häns'che Weiss Quintett, Vol. 6 (Da Camera Song, LP, released Mai 1974, recorded 29/30/31 October 1973)
- Häns'che Weiss Quintett: Dja Maro Drom (Electrola, LP, released September 1974, recorded 1–5 July 1974)
- Das Häns'che Weiss Quintett: Das Häns’che Weiss Quintett (Songbird 1975, recorded 24–29 September 1975)
- Häns'che Weiss Quintett: Fünf Jahre Musik Deutscher Zigeuner (Intercord 1977, recorded 24 February–1 March 1977, with Oscar Klein, Silvano Lagrène)
- Häns'che Weiss: Couleurs (CC-Records 1981, recorded January 1981, with Martin Weiss, Romani Weiss, Hans Hartmann, Dieter Goal, Albert Mair, Trilok Gurtu and Walter Buri)
- Häns'che Weiss Ensemble: Zugaben… (self-produced, recorded 1985)
- Häns'che Weiss Ensemble: Erinnerungen (Elite Special, 1988)
- Häns'che Weiss Ensemble: Vis à Vis (Elite Special, 1991)
- Häns'che Weiss: Special at Lloyd's (Deutscher Lloyd Versicherungen, recorded October 1995)
- Häns'che Weiss, Vali Mayer: "The Duo" Live (MMM, 1996)
- Häns'che Weiss, Vali Mayer: ...Just Play ! (MMM, 1998)
- Häns'che Weiss, Vali Mayer: ...Just Play! II (MMM, 2003)
