= Matelo Ferret =

French guitarist and composer

Background information
- Born: Jean Pierre Ferret; 1918
- Died: 24 January 1989 (aged 70–71)
- Genres: Romani music, musette, gypsy jazz
- Occupations: Musician, composer
- Years active: 1930s–1980s

Jean Pierre "Matelo" Ferret (1918 – 24 January 1989) (also spelled Matelot, Matlo and Matlow, surname also later spelled Ferré on occasion) was a French musette and gypsy jazz guitarist and composer. He was an associate of Django Reinhardt and the youngest brother of guitarists Baro and Sarane Ferret. He recorded with his own sextet in Paris in the 1940s and continued performing there, with occasional recording sessions, until his death in 1989. He was noted for a musical style that incorporated Russian and Hungarian influences and lived long enough to see a resurgence of interest in gypsy jazz in which he was recognised as one of the great surviving players of the genre. Two of his sons, Boulou and Elios Ferré, continue to play a more modern and individualistic form of gypsy jazz-based guitar music in Paris.

== Biography ==
Born into a Romani family, Matelo Ferret was the youngest of the three brothers from Rouen, France who made their way to Paris and there made the acquaintance of Django Reinhardt in 1931. He was known by his French nickname "Matelo," which meant "sailor". He replaced guitarist Gusti Malha alongside accordionist Émile Vacher and later played with Guérino, another well known accordionist.

From 1931, the Ferret brothers Matelo, Baro and Étienne "Sarane" Ferret, and cousin René "Challain" Ferret, were favored sidemen of Reinhardt. At that time, Django and his companions frequently played at the Russian cabarets in Paris, notably the Casanova and the Shéhérazade and, while Django moved away into a more jazz direction for the major part of his career, Ferret spent much of his subsequent time in the Russian cabarets and developed a unique guitar style incorporating many Russian and Romanian Romani elements as well as musette-style waltzes and jazz.

After recording as a sideman on various sessions in the 1930s and early 40s, his first sessions under his own name were cut in 1944 (as "Jean Ferret et son Sixtette"); he recorded sporadically through the 1950s and 1960s (including notable guitar contributions to the famous "Manouche Partie" LP) and summed up his life's work with the 2-LP set Tziganskaïa recorded for Charles Delaunay in 1978 (re-released on CD along with 4 unrecorded waltzes by Django Reinhardt which Ferret recorded in 1960) on which he was accompanied by his son Boulou on rhythm guitar, along with cimbalom (a favourite instrument of the Tzigane gypsy style) and double bass.

Ferret died of cancer on 24 January 1989, aged 70, a contemporary of Django who survived long enough to see the revival of interest in gypsy jazz and related music and to leave several modern filmed performances. Two of his sons Boulou and Elios Ferré continue to perform. A third son, Michel "Sarane" Ferré (nickname after his uncle Sarane Ferret), has also performed and recorded with his father.

== Partial discography ==
On 78 RPM discs:

- 1938 Gus Viseur's Music (with Gus Viseur, "Matlo", Baro & Challain Ferret and Maurice Speilleux, bass) - sessions rec. Paris, September 28 and October 20, 1938
- 1938 Albert Ferreri & Le Trio Ferret ("Matlo", Baro & Challain Ferret and Maurice Speilleux, bass) - session rec. Paris, October 20, 1938
- 1939 Le Trio Ferret (Baro, Matelo & Challain Ferret and Maurice Speilleux, bass) - session rec. Paris, March 2, 1939
- 1940 Gus Viseur et son Orchestre (with Gus Viseur, Matelo, Sarane & Challain Ferret and Maurice Speilleux, bass) - session rec. Paris, August 9, 1940
- 1941 Sarane Ferret et le Swing Quintette de Paris (with Baro & Matelo Ferret + others) - sessions rec. Paris, May and June, 1941
- 1942 Sarane Ferret et le Swing Quintette de Paris with Georges Effrosse (with Baro & Matelo Ferret + others) - sessions rec. Paris, ?? and October, 1942
- 1942 André Ekyan et son Orchestre (with Matelo Ferret + others) - session rec. Paris, July 22, 1942
- 1943 Matelo Ferret: Jean Ferret et son Sixtette - session rec. Paris, December 15, 1943

On EP & LP (plus CD reissues):

- 1951 Jean "Matelot" Ferret: Diner en Musique (EP) [?="Votre Dîner en Musique" (Columbia 33 FSX 105), below]
- 1954 as "Pierre-Jean Ferret et son Orchestre" on Various Artists: "Votre Dîner en Musique" Columbia 33 FSX 105 (4 tracks only) album details album cover
- 195x as "Pierre Ferret et son Orchestre" on Various Artists: "Super Festival Dancing No. 14" Columbia 33 FSX 108 (2 tracks only) ?= "Surprise-Partie No. 14" FLD 121 album details
- 195x as "Pierre Ferret et son Orchestre" on Various Artists: "Votre Thé en Musique" Columbia 33 FSX 108 (3 tracks only) album details album cover
- 1955 Matelo Ferret et son Quartette: Musique Pour Deux no. 14 (EP) album cover
- 1955 on Robert Ripa et sa Guitare: Chansons Grises, Chansons Roses (EP) Disques Vogue EPL 7136 album details
- 1956 on Robert Ripa: Robert Ripa chante "Le Bidon" du Film "Il Bidone" et "le petit bistrot de papa" (EP) Disques Vogue EPL 7252 album details
- 1960 (?1959, ?1961) Matelo Ferret: Jean "Matelot" Ferret et sa Guitare Joue les Inédits de Django Reinhardt (EP) Vogue (F) EPL 7740 with Jacques Montagne and Sarane Ferret, guitars album details
- 1961 Matelo Ferret: Jean "Matelot" Ferret et sa Guitare Joue les Inédits de Django Reinhardt [same title, different album] (EP) Vogue (F) EPL 7829 album cover
- 1961 on Marfisa: Chants de Corse [feat. Matelot Ferré, Jean-Marie Pallen] (EP) BIEM 424.253 album details
- 1962 on Robert Ripa: Fanny [feat. Matelot Ferré, Jean-Marie Pallen] (EP) Ricordi 45 S 235 album details
- 1962 on Jean Ferrat: Les Nomades [with Boulou Ferré, Matelo Ferret] (EP) Decca 451.160 album details
- 1965 Matelo Ferret (as Matelo Ferré): Marta (EP) with Michel Terrioux, vibraphone; Laro Sollero, guitar; Michel Gaudry, double bass; Andy Arpino, drums album details
- 1965 on Pierre "Baro" Ferret: Swing Valses d'Hier et d'Aujourd'hui - Pierre "Baro" Ferret, guitar with Jacques Montagne and Matelo Ferret, guitars + others album details
- 1967 on Various artists: Manouche Partie (with Jo Privat and others) - rec. 1960 and 1966 album details
- 1967 on Antoine Ciosi: Le Prisonnier [etc.] (EP) Consul C.M 2081 album details
- 19?? on Jo Privat with Matelot Ferret & Sarane Ferré Jr: Dansez sur les Plus Belles Chansons du Monde (2xLP) Discodis AZ FL 85.016/017 album details
- 19?? on Various Artists: Super Festival Dancing No. 14 Columbia 33 FSX 108 (2 tracks only)
- 1970 on Various artists: La Nuit des Gitans à l'Olympia de Paris - 1970
- 1971 on Gus Viseur: Swing Accordéon (LP) Vogue SMDINT 9928 album details
- 1979 Matelo Ferret (as Pierre "Matlow" Ferret): Tziganskaïa (2xLP) album cover
- 1988 Matelo Ferret: Tziganskaïa and Other Rare Recordings (re-released 2006 as Tziganskaïa - The Django Reinhardt Waltzes) Hot Club Records HCRCD 46 album details
- 1989 Sarane & Matelo Ferret: Tribute to Django INA FC 124 (live recordings, 1967 in Paris and 1973 at Samois) album details
- 2002 on Various Artists: Gipsy Jazz School - Django's Legacy (2xCD, compilation, 2 tracks only) Iris Music 3001 845 album details
- 20?? on Various Artists: Jazz Archives No. 144: Jazz Gitan 1939/1943 (compilation, includes 1930s and 1940s recordings as above) EPM Musique 159472 album details
- 2007 on Various Artists: Gypsy Jazz (4xCD) Properbox 128 (compilation, includes 1930s and 1940s recordings as above) album details
- 2009 Les Frères Ferret (Baro, Sarane, Matelo): Les Gitans De Paris 1938-1956 (3xCD, compilation) Frémeaux & Associés FA 5247 album details
- 2011 on Various Artists: Le Coffret Jazz Manouche (5xCD, compilation, 1 track only) Wagram 3243392 album details
- 2014 as Matelo Ferré: Rare Recordings (compilation) Hot Club Records HCR 352 album details

== Film appearances ==
- 1959 Hommage a Django Reinhardt (with Maurice "Gros Chien" Ferret), dir. Jean-Christophe Averty
