= Louis Ferrari =

Italian musette accordionist and composer

Louis Ferrari (1910–1987) was an Italian musette accordionist and composer who was active in France beginning in the 1930s. He established the Ferrari & Son Ensemble which played in Parisian clubs. Louis Ferrari was also the cousin of jazz accordionist Tony Muréna. His song Domino with French lyrics by Jacques Plante and English lyrics by Don Raye was popularized by singers including Bing Crosby, Doris Day, Tony Martin and Andy Williams.

== Works ==
Selected works include:

- Domino (1951)
- Tonnerre d'Amour
- La varenne
- N'oublie Jamais (I Can't Forget)
- Soir de Paris

Ferrari was also featured on a number of recordings.
