= Schnuckenack Reinhardt =

German jazz musician (1921–2006)

Background information
- Born: Franz Reinhardt; 17 February 1921
- Origin: Weinsheim, Germany
- Died: 15 April 2006 (aged 85)
- Genres: Classical music, folk music, jazz, gypsy jazz
- Occupations: Musician, composer
- Instrument: Violin
- Years active: 1930s–2006
- Labels: Da Camera Song, RBM, Intercord
- Formerly of: Schnuckenack Reinhardt Quintett

Franz "Schnuckenack" Reinhardt (17 February 1921 – 15 April 2006) was a German gypsy jazz musician (violinist), composer and interpreter. (Note: Where not attributed elsewhere, much of the text in this article is translated, with minor edits, from the entry for Schnuckenack Reinhardt on German wikipedia at Schnuckenack Reinhardt.) He was considered the "great violin virtuoso of Sinti music." He was a German Sinto; his music was mostly published and categorized under the contemporary names gypsy jazz or "Musik deutscher Zigeuner" (music of German gypsies). He "made this music accessible to a broad public" and made the most significant contribution to the presentation of gypsy music and jazz in Germany into a concert form. He was the pioneer of this style of music in Germany and directly or indirectly inspired many of the succeeding generation of gypsy jazz players in that country, as well as preserving on record a great many folkloric and gypsy compositions for future generations.

== Life and work ==
Schnuckenack, a relative of the virtuoso Belgian guitarist Django Reinhardt, whom he never met personally, was born on 17 February 1921 in Weinsheim, Rhineland Palatinate, Germany. His father Peta, a cousin of Django's mother, was also a violinist. Like most musical gypsies, he started playing at an early age with his family which at first followed a roaming existence as did most gypsies of that day; he appeared in concerts with the band of his father from the age of twelve. In the 1930s, the family settled in Mainz and Schnuckenack studied music for a while at the Mainz-based Peter Cornelius Conservatory. His nickname "Schnuckenack" – which quickly became his official nickname – comes from the Romani expression "schnuker nak: ("nice nose"). (Note: In Michael Dregni's book on Gypsy Jazz, this is apparently mis-translated as "nice noise", possibly a case of wishful thinking!) During the Nazi era, as a gypsy he was deported with his family in 1938 to the town of Częstochowa in south-central Poland. They lived there for five years, the family disguised as German-Hungarian musicians, always fleeing from discovery. On five occasions, Schnuckenack barely escaped shooting by the SS; his younger brother was not so lucky and was deported to Auschwitz where he was killed. Schnuckenack himself survived and returned to Kulmbach in Bavaria.

In 1966, during a pilgrimage to Lourdes, Schnuckenack met a young man who would change his life: Sigfried Maeker. This producer convinced the violinist to make the music of the German gypsies accessible to a wide audience. Schnuckenack gathered musicians and formed a Quintett whose drummerless lineup with two rhythm guitars was an exact copy of Django Reinhardt's Quintette du Hot Club de France and which gave its first concert in November 1967 in Heidelberg. This first Quintett consisted of Schnuckenack on violin and vocals, Daweli Reinhardt and Bobby Falta (who had also played with Joseph Reinhardt in the 1960s) on solo guitars, Spatzo Weiss on rhythm and Hojok Merstein on double bass. In 1967 and 1968, the group performed at the International Waldeck Festivals. In 1969, Bobby Falta and Daweli Reinhardt were replaced by Holzmanno Winterstein on rhythm guitar and the then 18-year old guitar virtuoso Häns'che Weiss, who hailed from East Germany, on lead acoustic guitar. This version of the Quintett released several albums including a live recording with the singer Lida Goulesco.

That version of the Schnuckenack Reinhardt Quintett dissolved in May 1972 with the departure of Häns'che Weiss, who went on to form the Häns'che Weiss Quintet with the teenage prodigy Titian "Titi" Winterstein on violin, Holzmanno Winterstein and Ziroli Winterstein on rhythm guitars, Hojok Merstein on double bass as well as himself on solo guitar.

Schnuckenack then formed a new quintet with the return of Bobby Falta on solo guitar, Schmeling Lehmann, and son Ricardo Reinhardt on rhythm guitars, and Jani Lehmann on double bass. According to Falta's preference, this quintet was more oriented towards jazz. In the following years, the quintet was replaced, and Schnuckenack's son Forello was the solo guitarist; the folkloristic part of the repertoire was again emphasized. Until 1991, the formation changed to a sextet, which was also made up of family members. Schnuckenack also performed with his "Talal" project, which followed the migration of the Roma from India to Europe.

One of Schnuckenack's most prized possessions was the "Pope violin" which was presented to him with a personal dedication by Pope Paul VI in 1965. He never played this instrument for money but it was used solely on religious occasions such as festivals and pilgrimages.

Schnuckenack resided in Sankt Leon-Rot, Baden-Württemberg from 1982 until his death in 2006. In 2000 the film maker Andreas Öhlers made a documentary film about his life called Die Ballade von Schnuckenack Reinhardt (The Ballad of Schnuckenack Reinhardt) which detailed his music as well as his wartime experiences. This film accompanies Schnuckenack Reinhardt on a journey with his sons to places that marked him and his music for life; by taking his sons to the places in Germany and Poland where he was persecuted and to the places where he pursued his musical career after 1945, he wants to pass on the family's history to them. The last stop on this itinerary is Samois-sur-Seine in France, the burial place of his great inspiration and relative, the jazz guitarist Django Reinhardt.

The Austrian artist André Heller, who was a friend of Schnuckenack, wrote the song "Mein Freund Schnuckenack" together with Ingfried Hoffmann, in which he refers to the life of the musician whose life was affected by both great joy and great sadness.

Schnuckenack Reinhardt died on 15 April 2006 at the age of 85, just after he had announced that he was retiring from performing, given a farewell concert 1 April 2006 in at the Parktheater in Bensheim, Germany, and announced that he was transferring the leadership of his famous Quintett to his brother-in-law Schmitto Kling, leader of the group "Hot Club the Zigan". He is buried in the main cemetery of Neustadt an der Weinstraße.

Schnuckenack's music differed from Django's, being a combination of both swing and Hungarian or eastern European styles with Romani vocals and high energy accompaniment, together with many traditional gypsy melodies and waltzes, but his various Quintetts played an important role in keeping Django's music alive especially through the 1960s when few others were playing it, and laid the foundation for numerous German Sinto groups that were to follow such as those of Häns'che Weiss, Titi Winterstein, the Hot Club da Sinti and others, also the next generation of great players such as Lulu Reinhardt, Wedeli Köhler and Martin Weiss.

== Awards ==
- Deutscher Schallplattenpreis (German Recording prize)
- 1996 Peter Cornelius Medal of the Rhineland-Palatinate

== Discography ==
- Schnuckenack Reinhardt Quintett – Musik deutscher Zigeuner Vol. 1 (Da Camera Song, LP, released February 1969, recorded 23/24/25 November 1968)
- Schnuckenack Reinhardt Quintett – Musik deutscher Zigeuner Vol. 2 (Da Camera Song, LP, released November 1969, recorded 10/11 June 1969)
- Schnuckenack Reinhardt Quintett & Lida Goulesco – Musik deutscher Zigeuner Vol. 3 (Da Camera Song, LP, released September 1970, recorded 13/14 May 1970; live recording at Heidelberg and Ludwigsburg)
- Schnuckenack Reinhardt Quintett – Musik deutscher Zigeuner Vol. 4 (Da Camera Song, LP, released April 1972, recorded 29/30 November 1971)
- Schnuckenack Reinhardt – Das neue Quintett, (RBM, LP, rec. early 1973, released ca. 1973)
- Schnuckenack Reinhardt Quintet – 15. März 1973 (LP, Intercord, 1973)
- Schnuckenack Reinhardt Quintet – Live (LP, Intercord, rec. Sept. 1973)
- Schnuckenack Reinhardt Quintet – Swing Session (LP Intercord, recorded Jan. 1975)
- Zigeunerorchester Schnuckenack Reinhardt – Pußtaklänge (2-LP Intercord, 1976)
- Schnuckenack Reinhardt Quintett – Czardas, Puszta und Zigeuner (LP Philips, 1976)
- Schnuckenack Reinhardt Quintett – 'S Wonderful Swing! (LP Philips, 1977)
- Schnuckenack Reinhardt Quintett – Remember Django (LP Philips, 1978)
- Schnuckenack Reinhardt Quintett – Jak-Swing (LP RCA, 1981)
- Schnuckenack Reinhardt – Ungarische Romanze (Hungarian Romance) (1991)
- Schnuckenack Reinhardt Quintett – Musik deutscher Zigeuner Vol. 8 (RBM, 1996)

Compilations

- Schnuckenack Reinhardt – Starportrait (Intercord, 2xLP, 1975; also CD, 1989)
- Musik deutscher Zigeuner, Vol. 1–8 (8-CD box set, RBM, 1996)
