= Féret (disambiguation) =

Féret or Feret is a French family name that may refer to

- Charles James Féret (1854–1921), English editor and historian of Fulham
- Jean-Baptiste Féret (1753–1808), French publisher, founder of La Librairie Féret / Editions Féret
  - his son Michel-Édouard Féret, co-author of the "Féret" 1846 i.e. Cocks & Féret wine guide
- Paul Féret (active 1984–?s), French tennis player
- René Féret (1860–1947), director of the Ponts et Chaussées Laboratory in Boulogne (destroyed in 1942), best known for the relationship between the water-cement ratio (w/c) and the compressive strength of the concrete
- René Féret (1945–2015), French film director and actor
- Marie Féret, French actress in Mozart's sister
- Julien Féret (born 1982), French footballer
- Daniel Féret (born 1944), Belgian politician, founder of the National Front

== Other uses ==
- Cocks & Féret, or Féret, the colloquial name of a Bordeaux wine created by Charles Cocks and Michel-Édouard Féret
- Feret diameter, a measure of an object size

== See also ==
- Ferret (disambiguation)
