= Jo Privat =

French accordionist and composer

Jo Privat (15 April 1919 – 3 April 1996) was a French accordionist and composer. Privat was born at Ménilmontant, Paris. He played for many years at Balajo, a musette club in Paris where he worked with Django Reinhardt, the Ferret Brothers, Didier Roussin and Patrick Saussois. Privat composed about five hundred works, influenced by bagpipes, Gypsy culture and American jazz. He died at Savigny-le-Temple and was cremated on April 12. His ashes were buried in Père Lachaise Cemetery.
