= María Ester Feres =

Chilean politician (1943–2021)

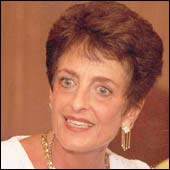
- Feres in 2003

Director General of the Dirección del Trabajo de Chile
- In office 1994–2004
- President: Eduardo Frei Ruiz-Tagle; Ricardo Lagos
- Preceded by: Jorge Morales Retamal
- Succeeded by: Marcelo Albornoz Serrano

Personal details
- Born: 14 February 1943 La Serena, Chile
- Died: 4 August 2021 (aged 78)
- Political party: PS

María Ester Feres (14 February 1943 – 4 August 2021) was a Chilean politician and lawyer. A member of the Socialist Party of Chile (PS), she served as Director General of the Dirección del Trabajo de Chile from 1994 to 2004.

== Biography ==
Feres studied law at the Faculty of Law of the University of Chile. During the Popular Unity government, she advised the Workers' United Center of Chile. Following the 1973 Chilean coup d'état, she moved to Germany with her husband and two children. She then graduated from the Complutense University of Madrid and returned to Chile in 1986. Upon her return, she became a legal advisor for the Workers' United Center of Chile and the Comisión Nacional Campesina. In 1994, she was appointed Director General of the Dirección del Trabajo de Chile, serving until 2004, when she was forced to resign in the midst of widespread and ongoing strikes across the country. Following her exit from politics, she worked for the Central University of Chile.

María Ester Feres died on 4 August 2021, at the age of 78.
