= Émile Vacher =

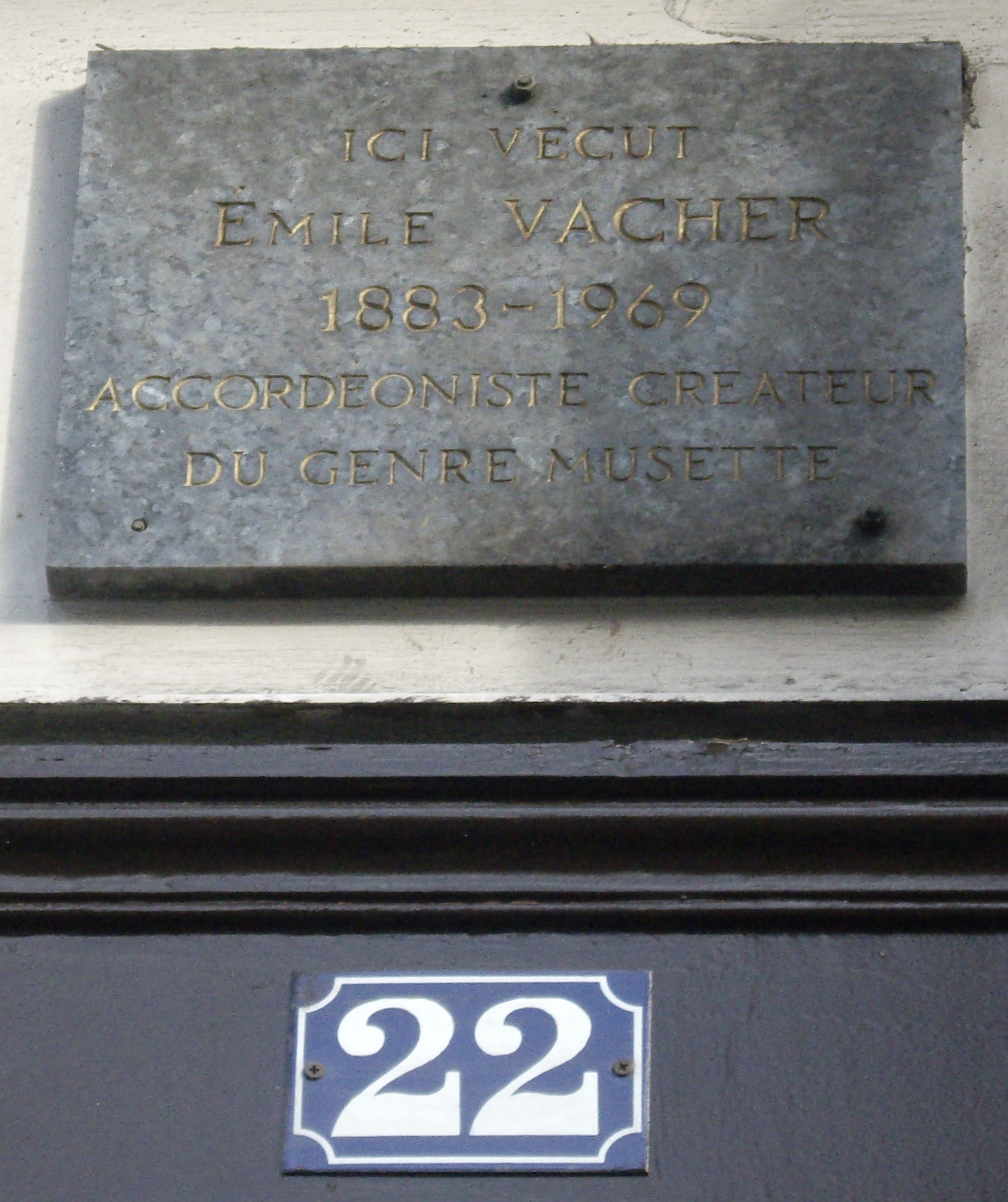
Commemorative plaque at 22, boulevard Saint-Denis, 10e arrondissement Paris

Émile Vacher (May 7, 1883 - April 8, 1969) was a French accordionist associated with, and often deemed the creator of, the bal-musette genre.

== Discography 78s ==
- Sous les toits de paris / Rêve d’amour, Odéon 238.101
- Nous deux / Un baiser, Odéon 238.163
- Albert / Meunier tu dors, Odéon 165.796
- J’ai ma combine / C’est Rosalie, Odéon 238.291
- On me suit / La java de Doudoune, Odéon 165.311
- Julie...c'est Julie / Tout ca c'est pour Vous, Odéon 165.312
