= Sarane Ferret =

Background information
- Genres: Romani music, Musette, Gypsy jazz, Continental jazz, Jazz manouche
- Occupations: Musician, Composer
- Instruments: Banjo, Guitar
- Years active: 1930s-1960s
- Formerly of: Francis-Alfred Moerman

Étienne "Sarane" Ferret (1912–1970) (surname also later spelled Ferré on occasion) was a French musette and gypsy jazz guitarist and composer, a contemporary and musical associate of Django Reinhardt, and the brother of noted Romani guitar players Baro and Matelo Ferret. He recorded with his own quintet in Paris in the 1940s and continued performing there, with occasional recording sessions, until his death in 1970.

== Biography ==
Sarane Ferret was the middle-born of the three Ferret brothers, Gitan gypsies from Rouen, France who made their way to Paris and there made the acquaintance of Django Reinhardt in 1931. He was known by his Gypsy nickname "Sarane". From 1931, the Ferret brothers Baro, Matelo and Sarane, and cousin René "Challain" Ferret, were favorite sidemen of Reinhardt. He initially made his name as a banjo player in Bals Musette, including with the Italian accordionist Vétese Guérino. He also accompanied Eastern European Gypsies in the Russian cabarets.

He formed his own quintet in the 1940s, incorporating clarinets on occasion as well as the violin of Georges Effrosse into the "classic" gypsy jazz lineup (Effrosse's tenure with the quintet was short-lived, however, dying in a Nazi concentration camp in 1944); Sarane's original compositions included "Cocktail Swing", "Royal Blue" and "Surprise-Party" as well as recording versions of compositions by Django Reinhardt. Sarane continued to perform through the 1950s and 1960s, though without the recognition of his wartime quintet recordings; at times his bands a variety of accompanists including Jaques "Montagne" Mala, Laro Sollero, René Mailhes and others. Married to Gusti Malha's daughter Poupée, he resided in Paris up to his death in 1970, which was marked by a tribute concert by the gypsies at the Olympia Hall in Paris, issued on record as "La Nuit des Gitans". His musical legacy was continued by Francis-Alfred Moerman (1936-2010) who accompanied Sarane many times from 1960 onwards.,

== Musical style ==
While Sarane's Swing Quintette was modelled on that of his great contemporary Django Reinhardt, his sound was somewhat different; commentator Michael Dregni states: "I hear in Sarane's fretwork a more deliberate, perhaps cautious guitarist... [his songs] imbued with a remote, even mysterious atmosphere... melodies floating on entrancing airs of minor-key wistfulness." For most of his career he is pictured with, and recorded with a Selmer guitar as indeed, were most French guitarists of the day; towards the end of his life he also recorded in a more mainstream, electric style as evidenced on his tracks on the album Tribute To Django recorded in 1967 for French radio (album released later, in 1989).

== Partial discography ==
On 78 RPM discs:

- 1940 Tony Murena et son Ensamble Swing (with Baro and Sarane Ferret and others) – session rec. Paris, 1940
- 1940 Gus Viseur et son Orchestre (with Gus Viseur, Matelo, Sarane & Challain Ferret and Maurice Speilleux, bass) – session rec. Paris, August 9, 1940
- 1941 Sarane Ferret et le Swing Quintette de Paris (with Baro & Matelo Ferret + others) – sessions rec. Paris, May and June, 1941
- 1940 Tony Murena et son Ensamble Swing (with Baro and Sarane Ferret and others) – session rec. Paris, June 14, 1941
- 1942 Sarane Ferret et le Swing Quintette de Paris with Georges Effrosse (with Baro & Matelo Ferret + others) – sessions rec. Paris, ?? and October, 1942

On EP & LP (plus CD reissues):

- 1960 (?1959, ?1961) Matelo Ferret: Jean "Matelot" Ferret et sa Guitare Joue les Inédits de Django Reinhardt (EP) Vogue (F) EPL 7740 with Jacques Montagne and Sarane Ferret, guitars album details
- 1961 Matelo Ferret: Jean "Matelot" Ferret et sa Guitare Joue les Inédits de Django Reinhardt [same title, different album] (EP) Vogue (F) EPL 7829 album cover
- 1970 on Various artists: La Nuit des Gitans à l'Olympia de Paris - 1970
- 1989 Sarane & Matelo Ferret: Tribute To Django INA FC 124 (live recordings, 1967 in Paris and 1973 at Samois) album details
- 2002 on Various Artists: Gipsy Jazz School - Django's Legacy (2xCD, compilation, 2 tracks only) Iris Music 3001 845 album details
- 2004 on Various Artists: Jazz à la Gitane - Bands of Gypsies (compilation, 1 track only) Saga Jazz album details
- 2004 on Various Artists: Jazz à la Gitane Vol. 2 - Gypsy Jazz Around the World (compilation, 1 track only) Saga Jazz album details
- 20?? on Various Artists: Jazz Archives No. 144: Jazz Gitan 1939/1943 (compilation, includes 1940s recordings as above) EPM Musique 159472 album details
- 2007 on Various Artists: Gypsy Jazz (4xCD) Properbox 128 (compilation, includes 1940s recordings as above) album details
- 2008 Sarane Ferret: Sarane Ferret et le Quintette de Paris - Enregistrements originaux de 1941 à 1956 (compilation) ILD ILD642271 album details
- 2008 on Various Artists: Jazz à la Gitane Vol.3: 'Round about Django (compilation, 1 track only) Saga Jazz album details
- 2009 Les Frères Ferret (Baro, Sarane, Matelo): Les Gitans De Paris 1938-1956 (3xCD, compilation) Frémeaux & Associés FA 5247 album details
- 2015 on Various Artists: Gypsy Jazz Not Now Music (2xCD, compilation, 2 tracks only) album details
