= Gus Viseur =

- Born: Gustave Joseph Viseur; 17 May 1915; Lessines, Belgium
- Died: 25 August 1974 (aged 59); Le Havre, France
- Occupation: Accordionist

Gustave Joseph Viseur (17 May 1915 – 25 August 1974) (Note: These details are from Grove. Dregni gives his name as "Joseph Gustave Viseur" and his date of birth as 15 May 1915.) was a Belgian born French accordionist.

== Early life ==
Viseur was born in Lessines, Belgium, on 17 May 1915. His father was a bargeman, so the family moved around a lot until 1920, when they settled in Paris. Viseur was given basic instruction in how to play the accordion by his father from the age of eight, and then had lessons from a music professor. Father and son played together in an amateur band from 1929. After his father died, Viseur "began performing on the streets of Paris in fairs and markets".

== Later life and career ==
In the early 1930s, Viseur played second accordion under bandleader Médard Ferrero. In 1933, he met René "Charley" Bazin, and the two accordionists started improvising, inspired by hearing jazz. This led to Viseur forming his own band in 1935. It played in a variety of styles and recorded four tunes that year. "Viseur had the reeds in his Fratelli Crosio accordion filed down and retuned", which replaced the traditional vibrato of a musette accordion with a more modern sound.

Viseur "was a member of the orchestra led by the pianist Boris Sarbek, then worked in France and Belgium with Philippe Brun, Joseph Reinhardt, and his own quintet". Together with guitarist Baro Ferret, Viseur added elements of swing to traditional musettes that they played from 1938 and into World War II. He had more public attention after recording "L'Accordéoniste" with singer Édith Piaf in 1940.

He toured the United States in 1963, then stopped playing and opened a record shop in Le Havre. He started performing again around 1970, and recorded the album Swing Accordéon the following year. Viseur died in Le Havre on 25 August 1974.

== Representative recordings ==
- "Flambée montalbanaise"
- "Joseph, Joseph"
- "Automne"
- "Confessin'"
- "Douce joie"
- "Josette"
- "L'imprévu" (with Joseph Colombo)
- "Nuit de Paris" (with Tony Muréna)
- "Soir de dispute"
- "Souvenir de Bruxelles"
- "Swing accordéon"
- "Swing-valse" (with Pierre "Baro" Ferret)
- "La valse des niglos"
- "Le Bal du p'tit jardin"
- "Jeannette"
- "46ème avenue"
- "5 Juin"
- "El Victor"
- "Lorsque Django jouait"
- "De Clichy à Broadway"

== See also ==
- Medard Ferrero
- El Ferrero
- Jo Privat
- Guerino and his orchestra
