= Baro Ferret =

Gypsy jazz guitarist and composer

Background information
- Born: Pierre Joseph Ferret; 1908
- Died: 1976 (aged 67–68)
- Genres: Romani music, gypsy jazz
- Occupation: Musician
- Instrument: Guitar
- Years active: 1930s–1970s
- Formerly of: Django Reinhardt, Matelo Ferret Sarane Ferret, René Didi Duprat

Pierre Joseph "Baro" Ferret (1908–1976) was a gypsy jazz guitarist and composer. He was known by his Romani nickname "Baro," which meant "Big One" or even "King" in Romany. Through his brother Jean "Matelo" Ferret, Baro met Django Reinhardt, and the two men became both friends and rivals. From 1931, the Ferret brothers, along with their third brother Etienne "Sarane" Ferret, and cousin René "Challain" Ferret, were favorite sidemen of Reinhardt. Baro recorded around 80 sides with Reinhardt. The Ferret brothers played with musicians including Didi Duprat.

Baro retired as a full-time musician during World War II and devoted himself to running bars and to black market businesses during the German occupation of Paris, an activity he continued into the early 1970s.

As a composer, Baro's "valses bebop" were years ahead of the times. His works such as "Panique...!," "La Folle" ("The Madwoman"), "Swing Valse" (written with Belgian-French button accordionist Gus Viseur), and "Le Depart de Zorro" were modernistic, surreal, and dark, part Musette, part modern jazz.

His nephews, Jean "Matelo" Ferret's sons Boulou and Elios Ferré continue to perform gypsy jazz.
