= Bal-musette =

French instrumental music and dance

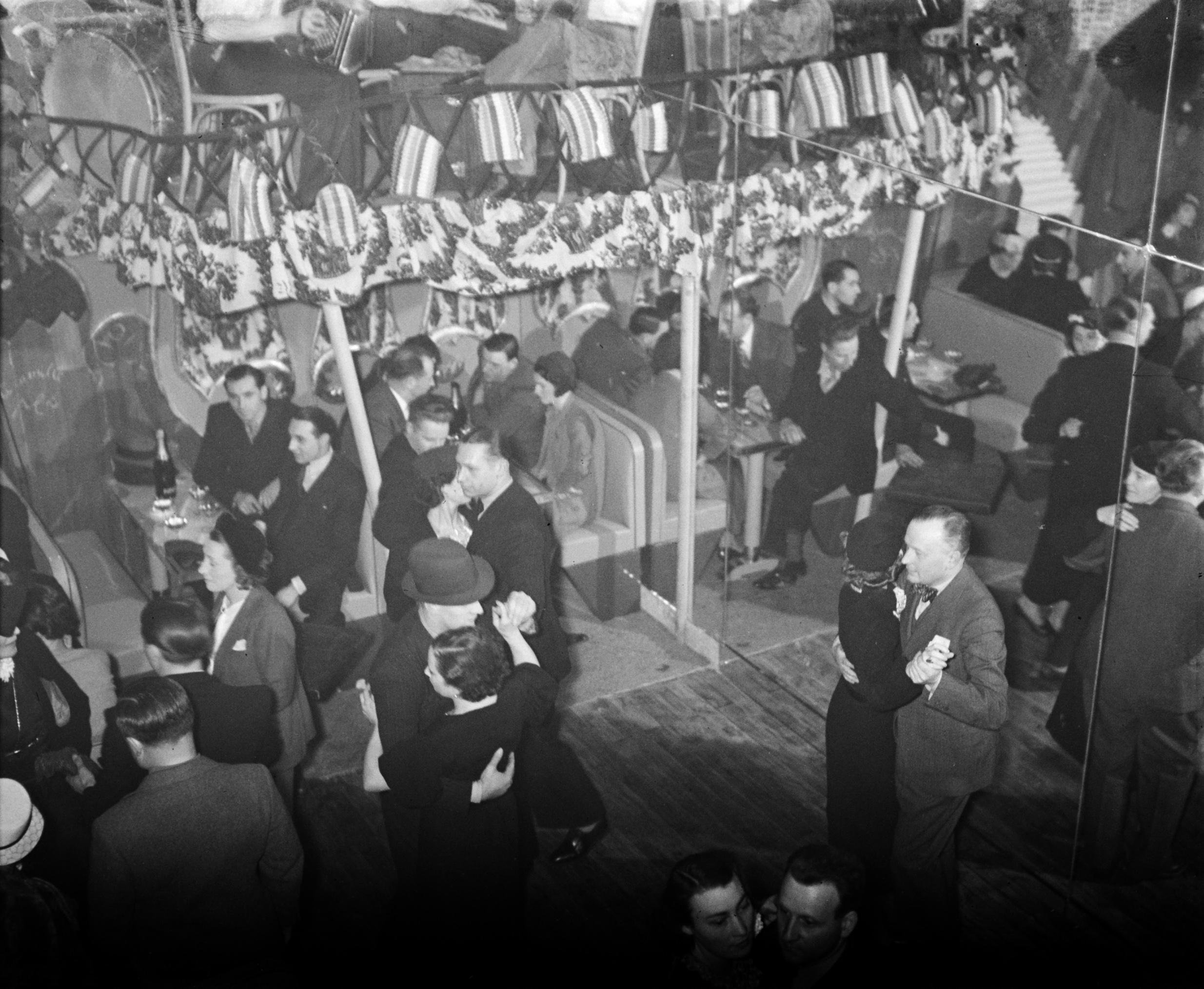
Le Balajo, a famous bal musette on Rue de Lappe in Paris (1936)

Bal-musette is a style of French instrumental music and dance that first became popular in Paris in the 1880s. Although it began with bagpipes as the main instrument, this instrument was eventually replaced by the accordion, on which a variety of waltzes, polkas, and other dance styles were played.

== History ==
Auvergnats settled in large numbers in the 5th, 11th, and 12th districts (arrondissements) of Paris during the 19th century, opening cafés and bars where patrons danced the bourrée to the accompaniment of the cabrette (a bellows-blown bagpipe locally called a "musette") and often the vielle à roue (hurdy-gurdy). Parisian and immigrant Italian musicians who played the accordion adopted the style and established themselves in Auvergnat bars especially in the 19th arrondissement.

When Italians began introducing new rhythms like the waltz and polka into the traditional musical form and began playing it on the recently introduced hybrid accordion, conflicts arose, and the Italian and Auvergnat styles split. By the end of 19th century, there were three kinds of bals-musette establishments:

- bal des familles – Auvergnat
- bal musette populaires – Italian
- guinche or bal de barrière – seedy hangouts frequented by low-lifes and so-called bohemians.

These places often were frequented by members of the French upper classes looking for excitement among the poor and downtrodden. Some establishments even staged mock police raids for their patrons' benefit. Performers of this era include Antoine Bouscatel, Émile Vacher, Martin Cayla, Charles Péguri, and Gus Viseur.

Musette dance forms arose from people looking for easier, faster and more sensual dance steps, as well as forms that did not require a large hall. "Musette-forms" that established themselves as variations to popular dances of the day include:

- tango-musette
- paso-musette
- valse-musette, with a special variation called la toupie ("the top"), where dancers are very close and turn around themselves very regularly.

An original musette dance also appeared, known as java.

Admission to most bals was free, but dancers bought dance tokens at the cash-desk. These tokens were made of metal in various shapes, with the name of the hall stamped on one side. In the middle of the dance, the bal director walked between the couples with a bag and the dancers turned in a token.

In the 1930s, gypsy jazz, a rhythmic form of swing music, drew on musette styles. By 1945, the bal-musette became the most popular style of dance in France and its biggest stars were widely known across the country. Its popularity declined drastically beginning around 1960. A revival of bals has begun, especially in larger cities, and a modern form of the musette is establishing itself.

== Bibliography ==
- Amandine Dewaele (1995), Les origines du bal musette, Paris 8e: Mémoire de maîtrise d'anthropologie.
- Roger Chenault (1995), La danse musette, Courbevoie: Author edition.
