= A Portrait of Jon Larsen =

Compilation album by Jon Larsen
- Released: December 2009
- Genre: Jazz
- Length: 70:21
- Label: Hot Club
- Producer: Jon Larsen

Jon Larsen chronology
The Jimmy Carl Black Story (2008)	A Portrait of Jon Larsen (2009)	Willie Nickerson's Egg (2011)

A Portrait of Jon Larsen is a compilation album by Norwegian jazz guitarist Jon Larsen that was released on his label, Hot Club Records.

Professional ratings
Review scores
Source	Rating
Hamar Arbeiderblad	5/6 stars
Romerikes Blad	6/6 stars

== Review ==
Larsen is celebrated on this album, which collects his best recordings from the past twenty years. It shows the acoustic string swing enthusiast he is, with vibrant, energetic original compositions that honor and continue the legacy of Django Reinhardt. But there is also room for variation and other genres, especially the tracks taken from Strange news from Mars project stand out. The guitar virtuoso is one of our most productive and open-minded musicians. Here are a number of stories from his diverse career.

== Reception ==
The Norwegian newspaper Hamar Arbeiderblad gave the album five stars, while the Norwegian newspaper Romerikes Blad gave it six.

== Track listing ==
All tracks are written by Jon Larsen except where noted.

No.	Title	Length
1.	"Nonstop"	2:59
2.	"Rupit"	1:58
3.	"Karlov" (Hot Club de Norvege & Vertavo String Quartet)	3:39
4.	"Goodbye to Earth"	1:16
5.	"Air Sculpting in Vacuum"	3:40
6.	"Montserrat"	1:52
7.	"White Night" (Hot Club de Norvege & Camelia String Quartet)	5:46
8.	"Willie Nickerson's Egg"	2:20
9.	"A Fairytale in May" (Hilde Hefte/Jon Larsen)	7:42
10.	"Mutant Fromage"	3:36
11.	"Lost and Found" (with Hot Club de Norvege & Tromso Symphony Orchestra)	6:10
12.	"The Lonely Wolf" (with Hot Club de Norvege)	7:10
13.	"Jimmy the Kid"	2:13
14.	"Strings to Come" (with Hot Club de Norvege & Vertavo String Quartet)	3:57
15.	"The Eons are Closing"	2:46
16.	"Pascal"	2:46
17.	"One Hot Cat"	2:13
18.	"El Velero"	2:17
19.	"Cinderella on the Event Horizon of a Black Hole"	2:17
20.	"Music Is the Best"	3:44

== Personnel ==
- Jon Larsen – guitar
- Jimmy Carl Black – vocals
- Hilde Hefte – vocals
- Bruce Fowler – trombone
- Biel Ballester – guitar
- Pierre Bluteau – guitar
- Per Frydenlund – guitar
- Pascal de Loutchek – guitar
- Stian Mevik – guitar
- Babik Reinhardt – guitar
- Jimmy Rosenberg – guitar
- Ulf Wakenius – guitar
- Finn Hauge – harmonica
- Tommy Mars – keyboards
- Egil Kapstad – piano
- Svein Aarbostad – double bass
- Bjørn Alterhaug – double bass
- Olaf Kamfjord – double bass
- Ole Morten Vågan – double bass
- Terje Venaas – double bass
- Rob Waring – marimba
- Håkon Mjåset Johansen – drums
- Eyvind Olsen Wahlen – drums
- Paolo Vinaccia – percussion
- Aja Humm – violin
- Ola Kvernberg – violin
- Kristina Nygaard – violin
- Nina Marie Olsen – violin
- Berit Værnes – violin
- Øyvor Volle – violin
- Henninge Båtnes – viola
- Maria Syre Mjølhus – viola
- Ane Stine Dahl – cello
- Bjørg Værnes – cello

== Credits ==
- Jon Larsen – producer, arranger
- Egil Kapstad – string arrangements
- Bjørn Kruse – string arrangements
- Gaute Storaas – string arrangements
- Jan Petter Lynau – cover photo
- Lars Hellebust – back cover photo
- Olav Urdal – photography
- Jamie Parslow – photography
- Jens Sølvberg – photography
