= Florin Niculescu =

Romanian violinist of Romani ethnicity (born 1967)

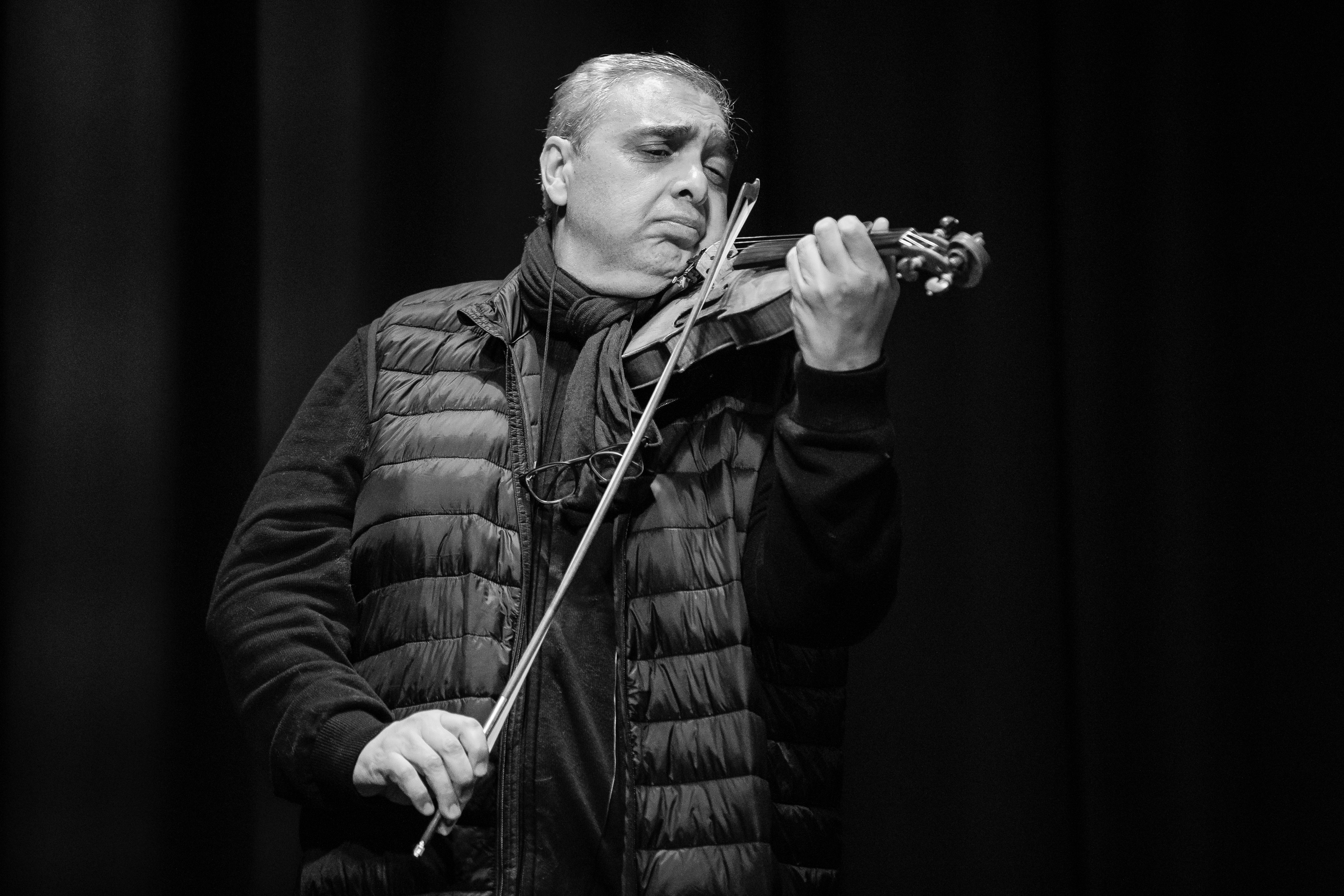
Florin Niculescu in 2024.

Florin Niculescu (born 8 February 1967 in Bucharest) is a Romanian violinist of Romani (Gypsy) ethnicity.

== Family background and education ==
Niculescu was born into a family of educated lăutari. Everybody in his family was involved in music: his father and his uncle were violinists, his mother a pianist and his sister a cellist. He received his first violin lessons from his father, with whom he started to study seriously when he was 4–5 years old. At 6 he enrolled at the Dinu Lipatti Music School and then at George Enescu Music High School where he was a first prize student. He played with his father at weddings and celebrations and developed his improvisation skills. When he was about 13 he heard violinist Stéphane Grappelli, who would become his idol and jazz his main attraction.

== Career ==
In 1991 he left for Paris to fulfill his dream of meeting Grappelli and making a name in jazz. He got his first gig at a Russian cabaret. He enrolled in the Conservatoire de Paris, although his jazz teacher told him from the first audition that he shouldn't waste his time and should be playing on stage. He continued to play on various scenes with various musicians.

Niculescu met Grappelli in 1994. Grappelli proposed they record an album, but Niculescu declined, believing that he didn't deserve the honor. He hoped to receive some lessons from Grappelli but Grappelli told him that he has nothing to teach him as the Romani had a fantastic natural technique. In 1995 he joined Romane's band, and in 2001 he was invited by Biréli Lagrène to join his Gipsy Project inspired by the Quintette du Hot Club de France.

He has worked with Roberto Alagna, Charles Aznavour, Marcel Azzola, George Benson, Dee Dee Bridgewater, Patrick Bruel, Regina Carter, Angelo Debarre, Angela Gheorghiu, Johnny Hallyday, Hot Club de Norvège, Patricia Kaas, Jon Larsen, Giani Lincan, Wynton Marsalis, John McLaughlin, Oscar Peterson, Bucky Pizzarelli, Babik Reinhardt, Jimmy Rosenberg, Henri Salvador, and Tchavolo Schmitt. Violinist Scott Tixier was Niculescu's only student, studying with him in Paris at the age of 15.

== Discography ==
- 1995 Portrait of Django with Hot Club de Norvège
- 1999 L'Esprit Roumain with Corneliu Niculescu
- 2000 Gipsy Ballad
- 2005 Djangophonie (Le Chant du Monde)
- 2005 Four Friends (Jardis)
- 2008 Florin Niculescu Plays Stéphane Grapelli (Blu Jazz)
- 2010 Django Tunes (Enja)
- 2018 Florilège (Hot Club Records)
