= Rêve Bohème =

Background information
- Origin: Denmark
- Genres: Gypsy jazz
- Years active: 1998–present
- Labels: Cope, Calibrated, Hot Club
- Members: Jens Fuglsang; Robert Pilgaard; Finn Poulsen; Jesper Riis
- Past members: Kasper Fredholm; Morten Ravn
- Website: reve.dk

Rêve Bohème is a Danish gypsy jazz quartet established in 1998 by guitarist and singer Jens Fuglsang and guitarist Robert Pilgaard.

== Biography ==
Rêve Bohème's music is inspired by the French gypsy jazz guitarist Django Reinhardt. The quartet played its first concert in 1998 at Bistro d'Eustache in Paris. In 2002-03 they performed at the "scene ouvert" at the Django Reinhardt Festival in Samois sur Seine, France. They released their first album Django Jalousie in 2002 with Kasper Fredholm (sax) and Morten Ravn (bass). The album was nominated for a Danish World Music Award.

Rêve Bohème have released six albums and recorded with Karina Kappel (voc), Lise Haavik (voc), Bjarke Falgren (vio) and Knut Haavik (perc). In 2009 the line-up was changed with Jesper Riis (bass) replacing Morten Ravn and Finn Poulsen (harm) replacing Kasper Fredholm.

Rêve Bohème has played in jazz clubs and at festivals in Europe, performing with Robin Nolan, Andreas Öberg, Jon Larsen, Basily, Paulus Schäfer, Angelo Debarre, Dorado Schmidt, Gary Potter, Biel Ballester as well as Danish musicians Pierre Dørge, Kristian Jørgensen and Jakob Fischer. Besides playing gypsy jazz, Rêve Bohème worked with electronica musician Bjørn Svin and the Danish fashion brand Baum und Pferdgarten on a music and dance show at Wundergrund Festival in Copenhagen in 2007.

In 2016 they composed and recorded music for several scenes in the Danish movie Fuglene over Sundet, which is about the Danish Jews' escape to Sweden in October 1943.

== Band members ==
- Jens Fuglsang (lead guitar and vocal)
- Robert Pilgaard (rhythm guitar)
- Finn Poulsen (harmonica and vocal)
- Jesper Riis (double bass)

Past members:

- Kasper Fredholm (tenor saxophone, 1998–2008)
- Morten Ravn (double bass, 1998–2009)

== Discography ==
- Django Jalousie (Cope, 2002)
- Django's Dream (Calibrated, 2005)
- Best of Rêve Bohème (Hot Club Records, 2006)
- Café Django (Calibrated, 2009)
- Django Goes North (Calibrated, 2012)
- Six & Six (Hot Club, 2018)

Compilation appearances

- Django Festival 4 (Hot Club Records, 2006)
- Django Festival 11 (Hot Club Records, 2018)
