= Jazz guitarist =

Guitarist who plays jazz music

Jazz guitarists are guitarists who play jazz using an approach to chords, melodies, and improvised solo lines that is called jazz guitar playing. The guitar has fulfilled the roles of accompanist (rhythm guitar) and soloist in small and large ensembles and also as an unaccompanied solo instrument.

Until the 1930s, jazz bands used banjo because the banjo's metallic twang was easier to hear than the acoustic guitar when competing with trumpets, trombones, and drums. The banjo could be heard more easily, too, on wax cylinders in the early days of audio recording. The invention of the archtop increased the guitar's volume. In the hands of Eddie Lang it became a solo instrument for the first time. Following the lead of Lang, musicians traded their banjos for guitars, and by the 1930s the banjo hardly existed as a jazz instrument.

Charlie Christian was the first guitarist to explore the possibilities created by amplification. Although his career was brief, it was influential enough for critics to divide the history of jazz guitar into pre-Christian and post-Christian eras.

== Early years: 1880s-1920s ==
In early days of jazz in New Orleans, most bands had guitarists, but there are no recordings by Lorenzo Staulz, Rene Baptiste, Dominick Barocco, Joe Guiffre, Coochie Martin, and Brock Mumford. Buddy Bolden, one of the earliest jazz musicians, played in a band in 1889 that was led by guitarist Charlie Galloway. King Oliver, another important early figure, belonged to a band in 1910 that was led by guitarist Louis Keppard, brother of Freddie Keppard.

Although jazz guitar existed during these years, banjo was a more popular instrument. The metallic twang of the banjo was easier to hear in a band than the acoustic guitar or piano, and it was easier to hear when recording on wax cylinders. The first person to make solo recordings on guitar was Nick Lucas, the dominant guitarist of the 1920s, when he released "Pickin' the Guitar" and "Teasin' the Frets" in 1922. He had experimented with wax cylinders ten years earlier. He became the first person to have a custom guitar named after him, the Gibson Nick Lucas Special. Nevertheless, his career was built on his reputation as a singer. He was popular on radio, Broadway, and in vaudeville. With his high-pitched voice, he sold eight million copies of his signature song, "Tiptoe Through the Tulips". Both the song and singing style were borrowed decades later by Tiny Tim.

== Replacing the banjo ==
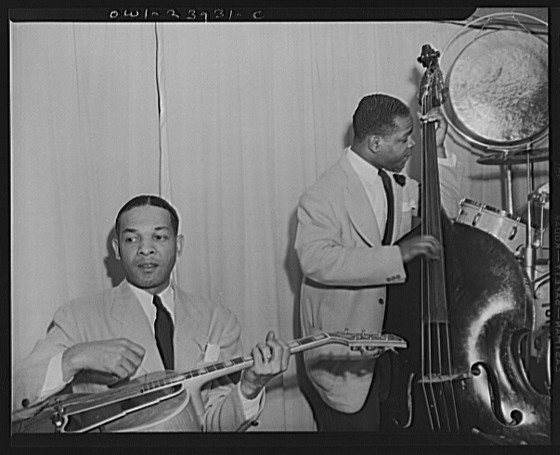
Duke Ellington's big band at the Hurricane Ballroom had a rhythm section that included a jazz guitarist, a double bass player, and a drummer (not visible, but who is to the right of the bassist).

Early jazz guitarists were meant to be part of the rhythm section. Freddie Green played rhythm guitar for the Count Basie Orchestra from the 1930s until Basie's death in the 1980s, contributing to the band's swing by inverting chords, also known as revoicing, on each beat. Like Green, Eddie Condon played rhythm guitar his whole career without taking a solo. Allan Reuss gave rhythm guitar a place in the big band of Benny Goodman.

The first jazz guitarist to step from the rhythm section was Eddie Lang. Wanting to do more than strum chords for the band, Lang played single-string solos. He drew attention to himself while he was a member of the Paul Whiteman Orchestra and as a popular studio musician. Like most guitarists of the time, he started on banjo, and when he switched to guitar, many others followed. His Gibson L-5 archtop became a popular model among jazz guitarists. By 1934, largely due to Lang, guitar replaced the banjo as a jazz instrument.

Django Reinhardt's flashy style stood out in the early days of rhythm guitarists. He was born in Belgium to a gypsy family. His gypsy jazz was influenced by the flamenco guitar of Spanish gypsies and the violin of Hungarian gypsies. In the 1930s, he formed the Quintet of the Hot Club of France, consisting of three acoustic guitars, a violin, and a double bass. He toured the U.S. in 1946 with Duke Ellington. The gypsy jazz tradition has a small but loyal following that continued in the work of the Ferré family, the Schmitt family, Angelo Debarre, Christian Escoudé, Fapy Lafertin, Biréli Lagrène, Jon Larsen, Jimmy Rosenberg, and Stephane Wrembel.

== Amplification ==
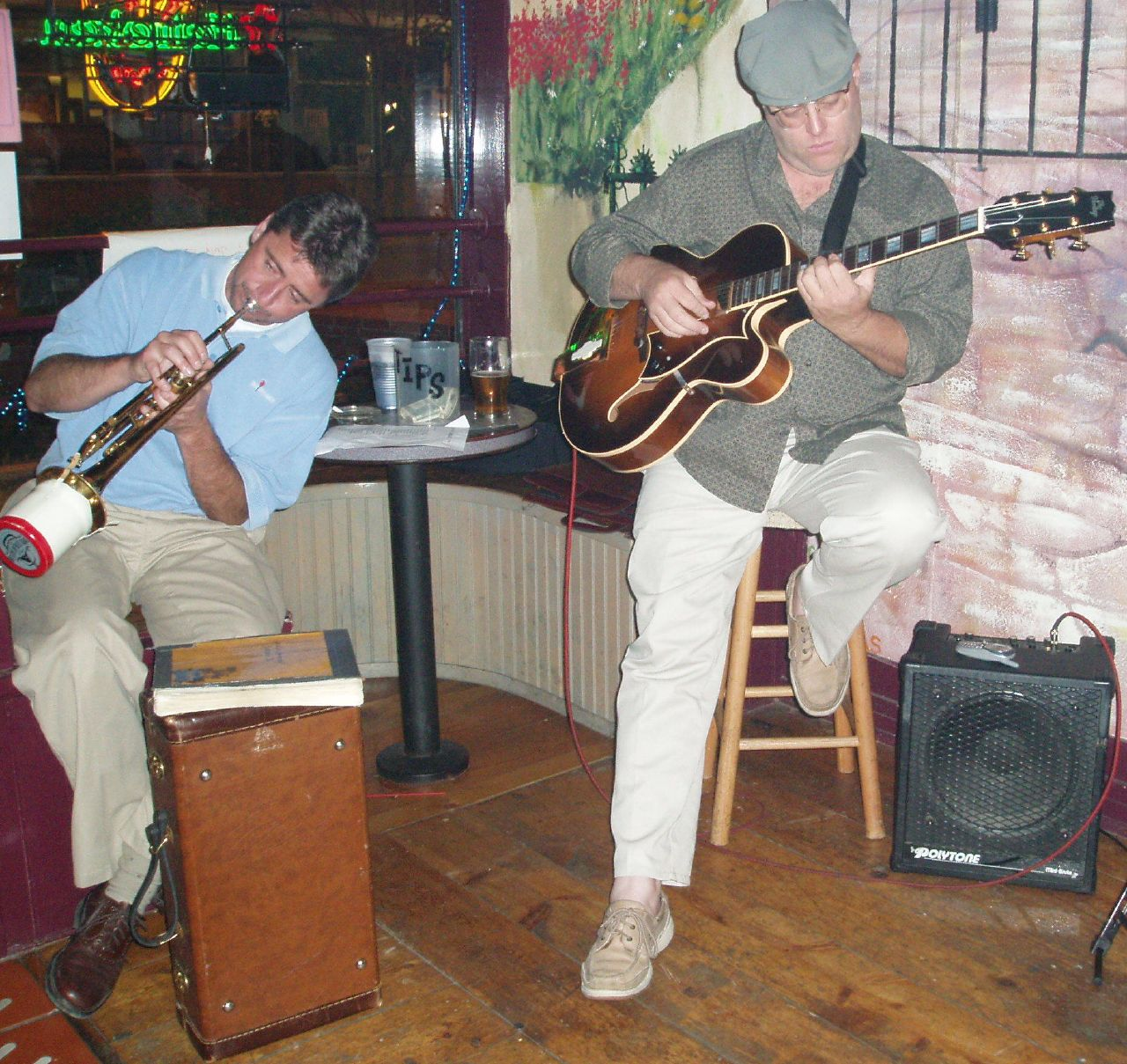
A jazz guitarist with his instrument plugged into a Polytone combo guitar amp (which combines an amplifier and a speaker).

Playing an unamplified archtop guitar is feasible for rhythm guitar accompaniment in some small groups playing in small venues. However, playing single note guitar solos audibly without an amplifier is a challenge in larger ensembles and in larger halls. Django Reinhardt's Hot Club of France was a string quintet in which being heard over the other instruments was rarely a problem. Argentinian Oscar Alemán, who was in Paris at the same time as Reinhardt, tried to overcome the problem of audibility by using a resonator guitar, as did Eddie Durham, an arranger and trombonist with the Jimmie Lunceford orchestra who also played guitar. Durham experimented with amplification and became the first person to make audio recordings with electric guitar when he recorded with the Kansas City Five in the 1930s. He played a Gibson ES-150 arched-top which Gibson had started producing a couple years before. Durham persuaded Floyd Smith to buy an electric guitar, and while on tour he showed his amp to Charlie Christian.

Before Christian, George Barnes was experimenting with amplification in 1931. He claimed to be the first electric guitarist and the first to record with an electric guitar, on March 1, 1938, in sessions with blues guitarist Big Bill Broonzy fifteen days before Eddie Durham recorded with the Kansas City Five.

Charlie Christian inspired many musicians to pick up the electrically amplified guitar after gaining the approval of renowned bandleader Benny Goodman, who was initially skeptical of the instrument's use in jazz orchestras. Christian's solo during the performance of the tune 'Rose Room' at the Victor Hugo Restaurant in Beverly Hills greatly impressed Goodman. On that night Goodman was convinced that amplified guitars held a place in jazz orchestras and that Charlie Christian belonged in his band. Thereafter, Charlie Christian was a member of the Benny Goodman orchestra.

Christian was the first person to explore the possibilities created by the electric guitar. He had large audiences when he played solos with passing chords. According to jazz critic Leonard Feather, Christian played a single-note line alongside a trumpet and saxophone, moving the guitar away from its secondary role in the rhythm section. He tried diminished and augmented chords. His rhythm suggested bebop. While in New York City, he spent many late hours at Minton's Playhouse in Harlem, playing with musicians such as Thelonious Monk and Dizzy Gillespie.

== Post-Christian era ==
Although Charlie Christian had a brief career (1939-1941), his impact was big enough that some critics divide the history of jazz guitar into pre-Christian and post-Christian eras. Mary Osborne saw Christian perform when he visited her home state of North Dakota in 1938. The performance inspired her to buy an electric guitar.

Oscar Moore, Irving Ashby, and John Collins were the successive guitarists for the Nat King Cole Trio who helped establish this kind of jazz trio format. In the early 1940s, Al Casey contributed to the liveliness of the Fats Waller Trio, while Tiny Grimes played electric four-string tenor guitar with the Art Tatum Trio. Barney Kessel and Herb Ellis continued the swing aspect of Christian's music into the 1950s.

As the swing era turned to bebop, guitarists moved away from Charlie Christian's style. Two pioneers of bebop, Charlie Parker and Dizzy Gillespie, recorded with young guitarists Bill DeArango and Remo Palmier and inspired Chuck Wayne to change his approach. Billy Bauer explored unconventional territory with Lennie Tristano and Lee Konitz, playing dissonant chords and trying to adapt the abstraction of Konitiz and Warne Marsh to the guitar. Although Jimmy Raney was influenced by Tristano, his harmonies were more subtle and logical. Johnny Smith carried this love of harmony into a romantic, chordal style, as in his hit ballad "Moonlight in Vermont". Tal Farlow avoided the abstraction of Tristano. Farlow blamed his ability to play quickly on the need to keep up with bandleader Red Norvo.

Wes Montgomery, Grant Green, Kenny Burrell and Jim Hall are perhaps the most important jazz guitar players of the sixties and of the following decades.

Bossa nova became popular in the early 1960s. The album Jazz Samba, released by Verve records in 1962, by Stan Getz and Charlie Byrd mixed jazz and samba. Two years later, with the album Getz/Gilberto with some compositions by Antonio Carlos Jobim, among them "The Girl from Ipanema", the bossa nova exploded. Although bossa nova isn't synonymous with jazz, the intermingling was fruitful for both genres. Brazilian guitarists include João Gilberto, Baden Powell de Aquino, and Bola Sete.

== Fusion, technique, and invention ==
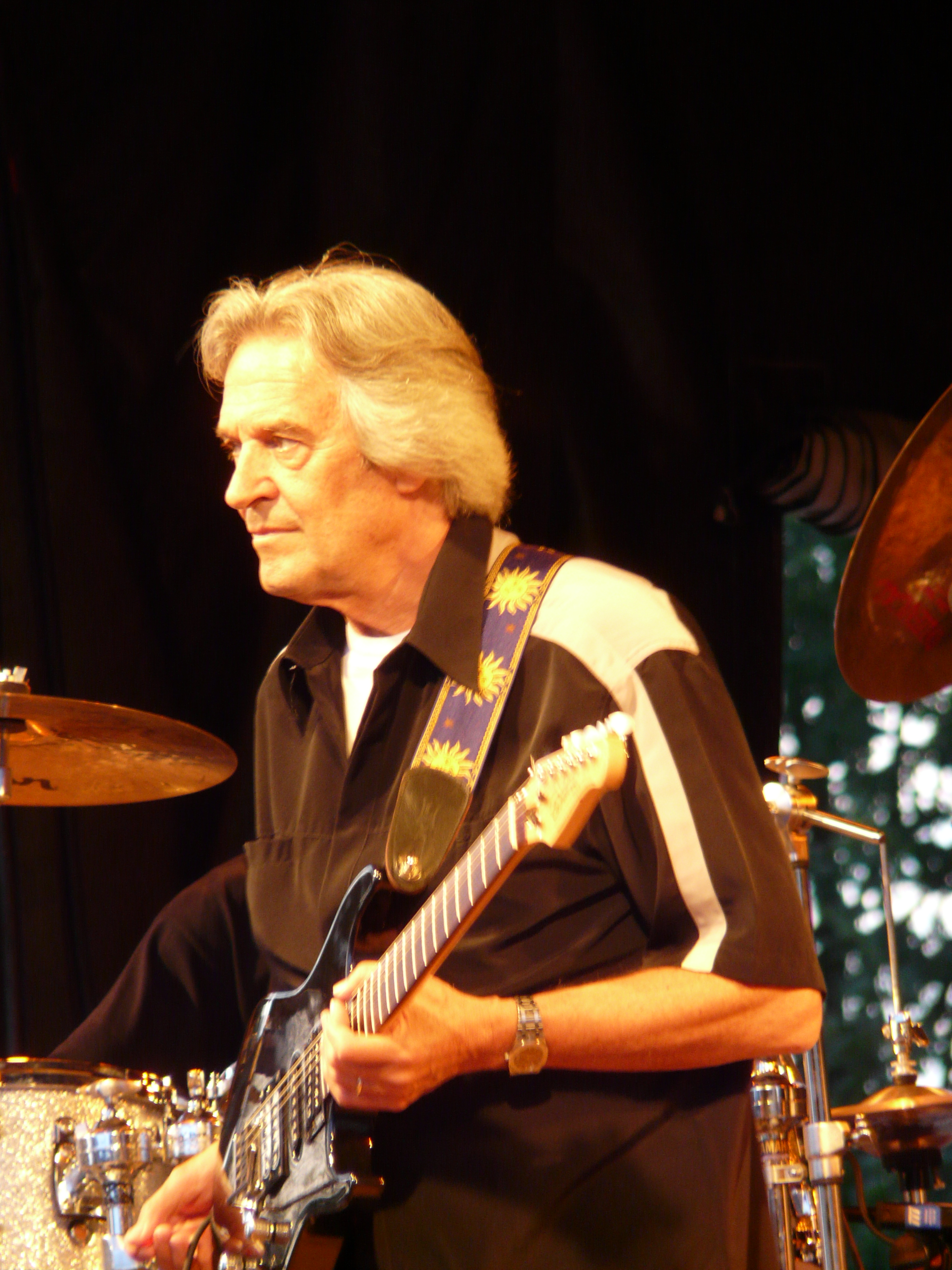
Jazz fusion pioneer John McLaughlin at a festival in Limburgerhof, Germany, 2008

When rock guitarist Jimi Hendrix became popular in the 1960s, he created the persona of the guitar hero, the charismatic solo guitarist dazzling the audience. He created possibilities on guitar through the use of electronic effect units. Hendrix inspired many musicians to pick up electric guitar.

One of them was Larry Coryell, who combined jazz and rock in the 1960s before the term jazz fusion was common. English guitarist John McLaughlin followed Coryell and Hendrix, but he explored other styles, too, such as blues, electronic, folk, free jazz, gypsy jazz, and Indian music. McLaughlin recorded an album of acoustic jazz in the early 1980s with guitarists Paco de Lucia and Al Di Meola. English guitarist Allan Holdsworth played jazz rock in the 1980s that was inspired by John Coltrane. Lee Ritenour is among the most popular jazz fusion guitarists. He established his name in the 1970s as a busy studio musician who recorded with acts in many genres.

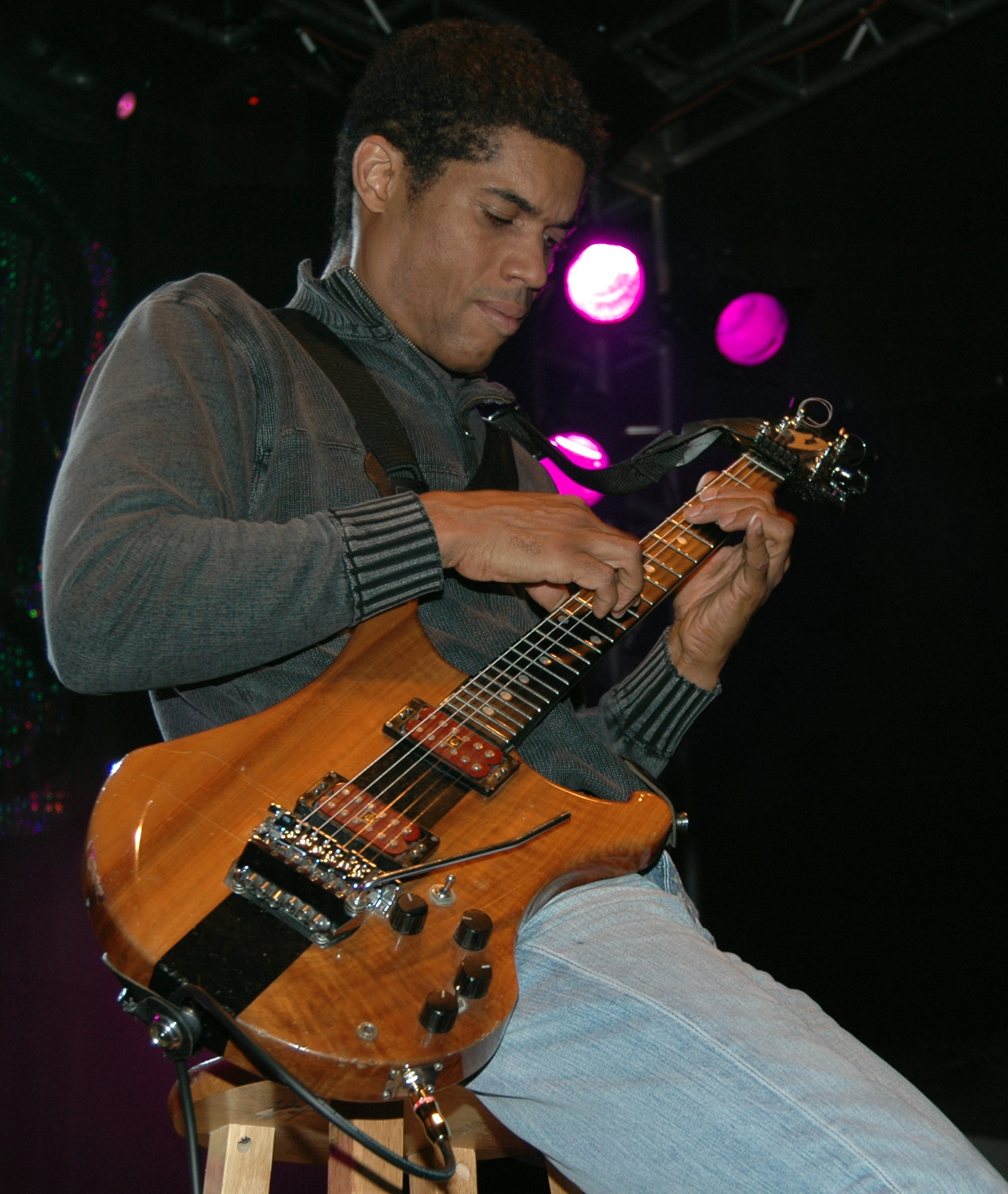
Stanley Jordan playing the fretboard like a keyboard

During the 1980s Stanley Jordan was the first to extend the hammer-on technique into his entire playing style. Jordan tapped the fretboard with the fingertips of both hands, playing the neck of the guitar like a piano. Others using tapping techniques to a lesser degree included David Torn and Tuck Andress. Some fusion guitarists reacted against the excesses of their predecessors by playing in a more restrained style. These included Larry Carlton, Steve Khan, and Terje Rypdal. Mike Stern began his career with the band Blood, Sweat & Tears, then was a member of Miles Davis's band in the 1980s.

Influences from free jazz in the 1960s made its way to the guitar. Sonny Sharrock used dissonance, distortion effects units, and other electronic gear to create sonic "sheets of noise" that drove some listeners away when he performed at festivals. He refused to play chords, calling himself a horn player, which is where he got his inspiration. English guitarist Derek Bailey established his reputation as part of the European free jazz scene. Like Sharrock, he sought liberation for its own sake and the breaking of all conventions in the name of originality. He belonged to the Spontaneous Music Ensemble in the 1970s.

== See also ==
- List of jazz guitarists
- Jazz guitar
