= Hilde Hefte =

Norwegian jazz singer (born 1956)

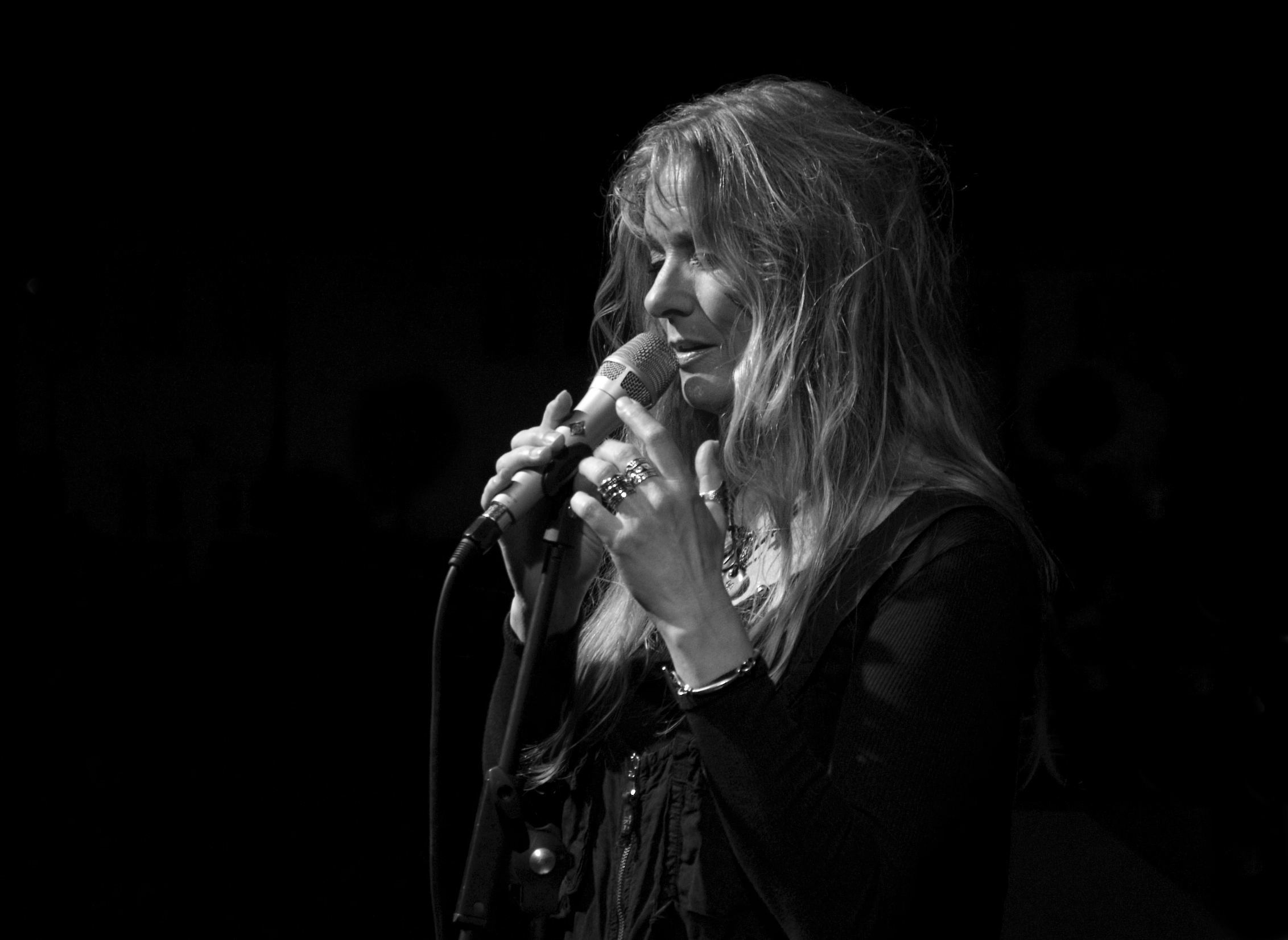
- Hefte live in 2008.

Background information
- Born: 1 September 1956 (age 69); Kristiansand, Vest-Agder
- Origin: Norway
- Genres: Jazz
- Occupations: Musician, composer
- Instruments: Vocals, piano
- Label: Ponca Jazz Records
- Website: www.hildehefte.no

Hilde Hefte (born 1 September 1956 in Kristiansand, Norway) is a Norwegian jazz singer.

== Biography ==
Hefte got much of her musical education from the well reputated Barratt Due Institute of Music in Oslo, Norway with piano as primary and vocals as secondary instruments. She played saxophone and clarinet for ten years when she was young, as an apprentice to her father who was saxophone teacher and musician. She was also trained as an actor, first with Alex Scherpf and later joining a Theater school. She also received an increasing number of roles at Agder Teater and at various other venues, including in plays like Fugleelskerne by Jens Bjørneboe, and Piaf by Pan Gam. During a period of some years she was also teaching music at Agder musikkonservatorium before she started as a full-time musician.

Her debut solo album Round Chet's Midnight was released in 1999, and received great reviews, like Down Beat Magazine: "She's making waves on the Norwegian scene."

There after Hefte has released five more albums under her own name, receiving excellent reviews in the press. She has written lyrics and composed music to both her own albums and a lot of other artists. Hilde has been given various leading roles at the theatre, among others; the main role as Edith Piaf at Agder Theatre. She has also been hired to write and arrange music for various locale theatre productions. Jazz musician - recordings: 'Round Chet's Midnight (1999), Playsong – The Music of Bill Evans (2001) Hildes BossaHefte (2003), her onely Norwegian album, On The Corner (2006), An Evening in Prague (2007), recorded in Prague, with Prague Philharmonic Orchestra. In 2013 she released the album Short Stories, and in 2017 the album Quiet Dreams.

Hilde founded and runs Norsk Jazzforlag (2003) and the record label Ponca Jazz Records (2004).

== Honors ==
- 2016: The Kristiansand Municipality Culture Award
- 2015: Southern Norwegian jazz center award

== Discography ==
=== Solo albums ===
- 1999: Round Chet's Midnight (Hot Club)
- 2001: Playsong – The Music of Bill Evans (Hot Club)
- 2003: Hildes bossaHefte (Hot Club )
- 2006: On The Corner (Ponca Jazz)
- 2007: An Evening in Prague (Ponca Jazz)
- 2013: Short Stories (Ponca Jazz)
- 2014: Memory Suite (Ponca Jazz), Japan release
- 2017: Quiet Dreams (Ponca Jazz)

=== Collaborations ===
- 1997: Kråka Knas
- 2000: Violin (Ola Kvernberg)
- 2002: Spor.sorland
- 2002: Nice But Easy (Kultur & Spetakkel), with Paul Weeden
- 2003: The Next Step (Hot Club), with Jon Larsen
- 2006: Jazz Collection 1 (Ponca Jazz), with various artists
- 2008: Vi Aner Deg
- 2009: Fight Apathy
- 2009: A Portrait of Jon Larsen (Hot Club)
- 2011: Bossa Nova Around the World (Putamayo)
