= Ponca Jazz Records =

Norwegian record label

Ponca Jazz Records is a jazz record label founded by Hilde Hefte in Kristiansand, Norway in 2004.

== Background ==
Hefte had an idea of releasing the Rolf Søder recording Jargong Vålereng' with Egil Kapstad as composer, arranger and band leader. This idea evolved and eventually she started the label Ponca Jazz, and Jargong Vålereng' was released as an album in 2004. There after many artists showed interest, and a series of albums was released in 2005.

Then Jon Larsen offered Ponca Jazz Records to take over parts of Hot Club Records' catalog. This was interesting, and lead to a faster growth, and allowed Ponca Jazz Records to become one of the major jazz labels in Norway. Several key jazz musicians and singers are now in Ponca Jazz Records catalog.

== Discography ==
Albums (in selection)

| PJRCD 100 | Hilde Hefte | On the Corner | 2006 | CD |
| PJRCD 102 | Einar Iversen | Me and My Piano | 2005 | CD |
| PJRCD 103 | Rolf Søder, Egil Kapstad Og Hans Musikanter | Jargong Vålereng | 2004 | CD |
| PJRCD 106 | Hallgeir Pedersen Trio | Bluero | 2006 | CD |
| PJRCD 109 | Lee Konitz / John Pål Inderberg | Live in Oslo | 2007 | CD |
| PJRCD 110 | Odd R. Antonsen Big Band | With Guests | 2007 | CD |
| PJRCD 111 | Hilde Hefte | An Evening in Prague | 2008 | CD |
| PJRCD 112 | Odd Riisnæs | Another Road | 2008 | CD |
| PJRCD 113 | Tom Olstad | Changes for Mingus | 2007 | CD |
| PJRCD 114 | Erling Wicklunds Storeslem | Live at Lancelot | 2008 | CD |
| PJRCD 116 | Svein Olav Herstad | Free the Nightingale | 2010 | CD |
| PJRCD 117 | Jan Berger | Ego Trip | 2009 | CD |
| PJRCD 118 | Ivar Antonsen, Vigleik Storaas | Dialogues | 2010 | CD |
| PJRCD 119 | Bjørn Alterhaug Quintet | Songlines | 2009 | CD |
| PJRCD 120 | Antonsen, Hvalryg, Olstad Trio | A Day at the Opera | 2011 | CD |
| PJRCD 122 | Liv Stoveland | Close Your Eyes | 2009 | CD |
| PJRCD 124 | Hilde Hefte | Short Stories | 2013 | CD |
| PJRCD 125 | Oddbjørn Blindheim Trio | Piano Pals | 2014 | CD |
| PJRCD 126 | Hilde Hefte | Quiet Dreams | 2017 | CD |
| PJRCD 127 | Bjørn Alterhaug Quintet | Innocent Play | 2014 | CD |
| PJRCD 128 | Liv Stoveland | Solitary Moon | 2016 | CD |
