= Robert Normann =

Norwegian jazz guitarist

- Born: Robert Uno Normann; 27 June 1916; Borge, Østfold, Norway
- Died: 20 May 1998 (aged 81) Kvastebyen, Sarpsborg, Østfold
- Genres: Jazz
- Occupation: Musician
- Instruments: Guitar, banjo, accordion, tenor saxophone
- Website: robertnormann.no

Robert Uno Normann (27 June 1916 – 20 May 1998) was a Norwegian guitarist and considered a jazz guitar pioneer.

== Career ==
Normann was an autodidact performer on the accordion and tenor saxophone, and eventually on the guitar as his main instrument. He was one of the swing era's most sought guitar soloists in Norway, and was also a pioneer of electric guitar. His first electric guitar was enabled in 1939 by constructing a pickup of copper wire, magnets and pitch, stolen from public phones, Normann told in an interview with Jon Larsen.

Background

Normann began his musical career as a wandering street and backyard musician at age 12. He was a professional musician in 1937. On Oslo jazz scene he performed in several swing jazz groups. He played with Freddy Valier in 1938, String Swing in 1939–42, Gunnar Due in 1939–41, and simultaneously led his own quartet. In this period he also played tenor saxophone and was with the Pete Brown Big Band from 1945 and various random jazz groups. He played concerts with his own solo section and could be heard at the revue theaters "Edderkoppen" and Chat Noir for several years. He also played with Frank Ottersen, and later Willy Andresen. He got several career offers from international artists, including from Benny Goodman and Barney Kessel, that he turned down. In 1988 the jazz recordings of Normann were for the first time collected and reissued on the label Hot Club Records (produced by Jon Larsen, who also wrote biographical articles about Normann). After his death, the old recordings were taken over by his family (Normann Records).

Style of play

Normanns play can mislead people into thinking that Django Reinhardt was the inspiration, but by his own account he never listened recordings with the Belgian guitarist, but to American musicians Teddy Wilson and Leon Chu Berry, and various accordionists. From 1955, he was less active in the jazz context, for example because of significant alcohol problems.

Television recordings

Normann was one of the first that started with trick recordings in Les Paul style. In his repertoire you find concertos for accordion, arranged and performed on guitar. Normann was presented for the Norwegian audience through break programs produced for NRK in 1971 and 1974. As a studio musician Normann is currently registered with the participation of close to 1300 productions, and in the period from 1968 to 1982 he was responsible for several musical productions for Riksteatret. He has composed music to multiple folk texts, among others by Alf Prøysen, and has also composed music for film and theater and small pieces of music inspired by jazz and traditional Norwegian folk music.

Retirement

Normann retired as an active musician in 1982, and devoted his time to small scale farming and inventions. Inspired by the re-release of his recordings by Hot Club Records, produced by guitarist Jon Larsen, Normann entered the studio again in 1992, for the last time with the music he called "Syv stubbær for én gitar og trommer" (Seven pieces for the guitar and drums). His latest bass player Håkon Nilsen was deceased, and Normann replaced him by placing a microphone oktavboks of the three lowest guitar strings. The one time so wital giant withdrew gradually from the outside world, and lived his last years in isolation in Kvastebyen, Skjeberg, Østfold, hence the characteristic "the jazz version of Greta Garbo" by Knut Borge.

The organization Friends of Robert Normann

Robert Normanns Venner (Friends of Robert Normann) was founded in 1999 with the purpose of collecting and disseminating information about Normann's artistic work. The association was previously located in Sarpsborg, Østfold, but is currently under Normann Records, operated by the Normann family with Wenche Normann as manager.

== Plays on Riksteatret ==
- 1968 Venner og elskere
- 1975 Fugleelskerne
- 1976 Frieriet
- 1976 Gjete kongens harer
- 1976 En sommernattsdrøm
- 1976 Tobakkens uheldige virkninger
- 1976 Bjørnen
- 1976 Jeppe på Bjerget
- 1976 Østenfor sol og vestenfor måne
- 1977 Victoria
- 1977 Troll kan temmes
- 1977 Revisoren
- 1978 Kameliadamen
- 1978 Tor med hammer'n
- 1978 Geografi og kjærlighet
- 1979 Det hendte i Riga
- 1979 Landet hvor alt er annerledes
- 1982 Balladen om Robin Hood

== Discography ==
=== Solo recordings ===
Recordings with different early jazz groups are released on the label Jazz Hot & Swing – Jazz in Norway 1920–1940

- 2001: Sigarett stomp – Jazz in Norway 1940–1950
- 1988: Robert Normann vol. 1 – String Swing (1938–1941)
- 1988: Robert Normann vol. 2 – Sigarett Stomp

Later radio recordings of small groups and his own solos

- 1990: Robert Normann vol. 3 – Tricky Fingers (1959–89)
- 1988: Robert Normann vol. 4 – Perpetuum mobile and other rare recordings 1959–1974
- 1996: The Best of Robert Normann (1941–1989)

=== Collaborations ===
With Inger Jacobsen with Robert Normanns Kvartet

- 1956: På En Bar I Rio Single (Columbia Records)

With Alf Prøysen

- – Alf Prøysen Single (Philips)

With Sigbjørn Bernhoft Osa

- 1963: Plays Norwegian Dances 1 Single (RCA Victor)
