= Hot Club de Norvège =

Norwegian jazz band

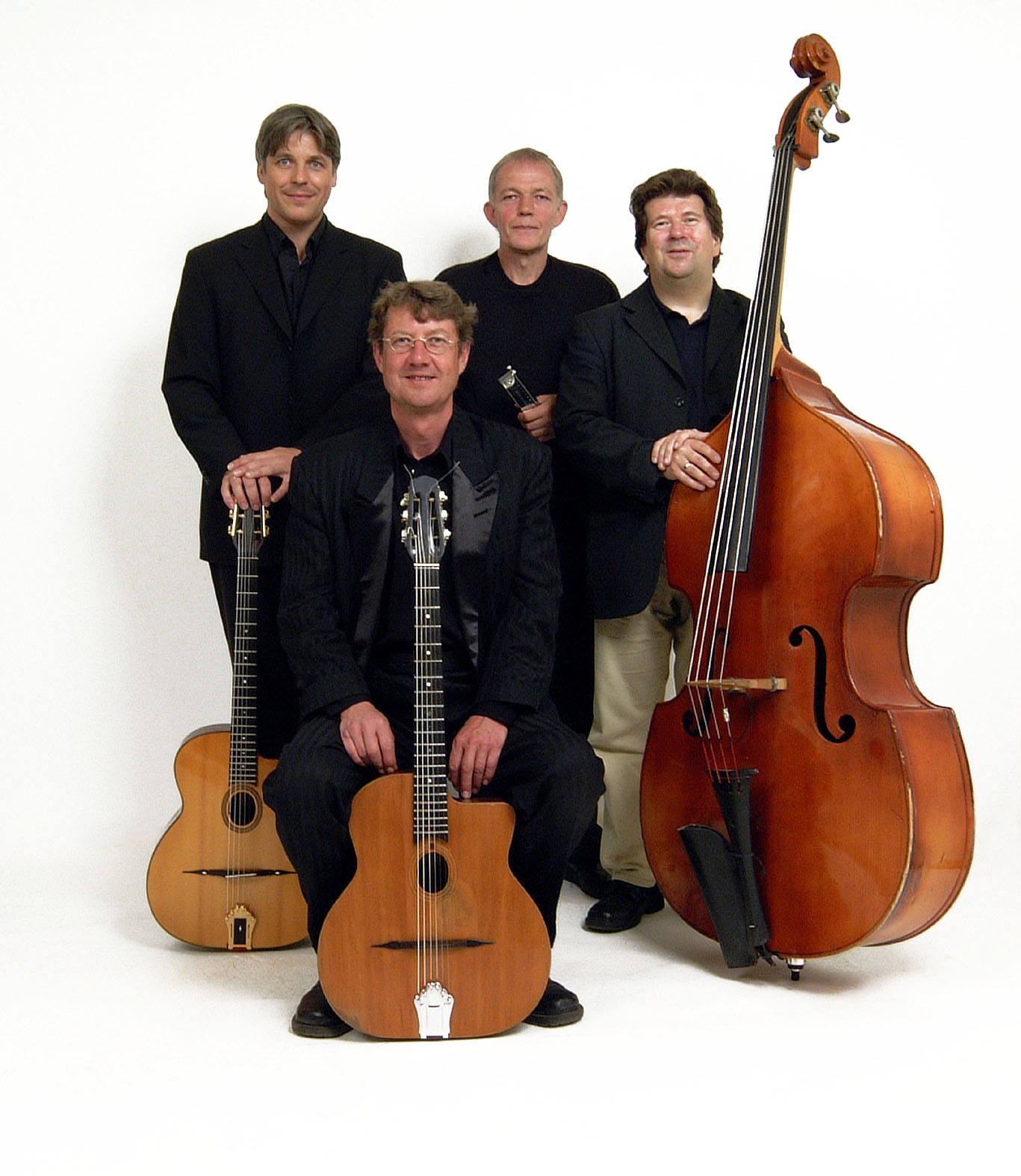
- Hot Club de Norvège in 2009

Background information
- Origin: Norway
- Genres: Gypsy jazz, jazz
- Years active: 1979–present
- Labels: Hot Club
- Members: Ola Erlien; Gildas Le Pape; Finn Hauge; Svein Aarbostad
- Past members: Jon Larsen; Per Frydenlund; Ivar Brodahl

Hot Club de Norvège is a string jazz quartet from Norway, established in 1979, by guitarist Jon Larsen with childhood friends Per Frydenlund and Svein Aarbostad.

== Biography ==
They are influenced by the music of Hot Club de France, and the French gypsy guitarist Django Reinhardt. They formed a quartet with violinist Ivar Brodahl (1928–2003), later replaced by Finn Hauge, that became part of the international renaissance of the gypsy jazz in the 1980s.

Hot Club de Norvege has worked with Stéphane Grappelli, Jimmy Rosenberg, Stochelo Rosenberg, Nigel Kennedy, and the Vertavo String Quartet.

In 1980 they started the Django Festival in Norway.

Larsen retired in 2019 and was replaced with then 18-year old Ola Erlien.

== Band members ==
Current

- Ola Erlien (guitar)
- Gildas Le Pape (guitar)
- Finn Hauge (violin and harmonica)
- Svein Aarbostad (upright bass)

Past

- Jon Larsen (guitar)
- Per Frydenlund (guitar)
- Ivar Brodahl (violin)

== Discography ==
- 1981: String Swing (Herman)
- 1982: String SwingOld, New, Borrowed & Blue (Hot Club)
- 1984: Gloomy (Hot Club)
- 1986: Swing De Paris (Hot Club)
- 1997: Hot Shots (Hot Club)
- 1999: Moreno (Hot Club), with Moreno Winterstein featuring Angelo Debarre
- 2000: Hot Club De Norvege Featuring Ola Kvernberg & Jimmy Rosenberg (Hot Club)
- 2001: Swinging With Vertavo, Angelo & Jimmy (Hot Club), featuring Ulf Wakenius
- 2002: White Night Stories (Hot Club)
- 2005: Hot Cats (Hot Club), with Camellia String Quartet
- 2005: White Night Live (Hot Club), with Ola Kvernberg and the Tromsø Symphony Orchestra
- 2005: Vertavo (Hot Club), featuring Ulf Wakenius and the Vertavo String Quartet
- 2008: Django Music (Hot Club)
- 2009: A Portrait of Jon Larsen (Hot Club)
