= Ola Kvernberg =

Norwegian jazz musician (born 1981)

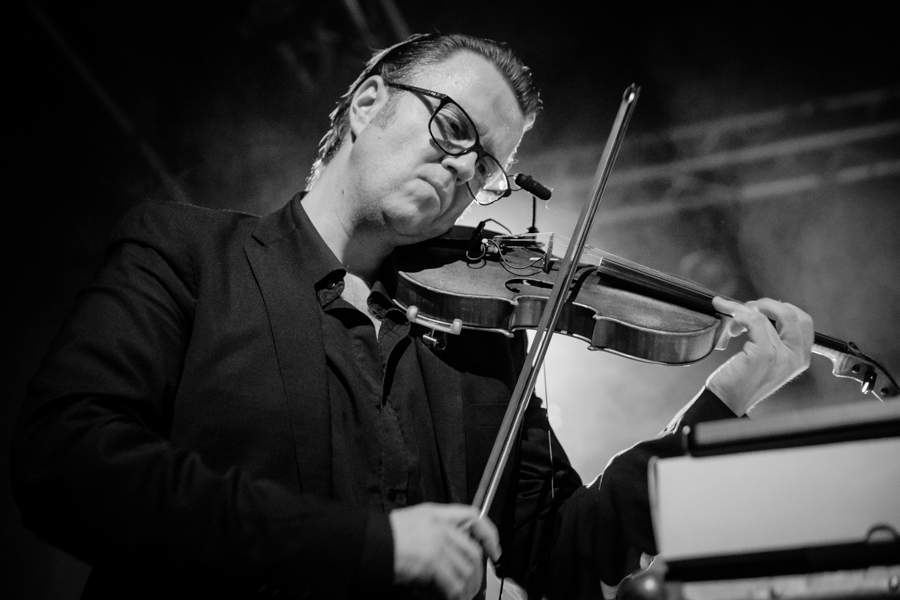
- Kvernberg at the 2018 Kongsberg Jazzfestival

Background information
- Born: 16 June 1981 (age 45); Fræna Municipality, Møre og Romsdal, Norway
- Genre: Jazz
- Occupations: Musician, composer
- Instrument: Violin
- Label: Jazzland
- Website: www.olakvernberg.com

Ola Kvernberg (born 16 June 1981) is a Norwegian jazz musician known for his virtuosic string swing violin playing and his international performances. He is the son of traditional musicians Liv Rypdal Kvernberg and Torbjørn Kvernberg, and the brother of traditional musicians Kari Kvernberg Dajani and fiddler Jorun Marie Kvernberg, and grandson of the fiddler and traditional music composer Peter L. Rypdal. Kvernberg studied classical violin from the age of nine, and won 3rd prize in a great classical violin competition in Italy when he was fourteen.

== String swing with Hot Club de Norvège ==
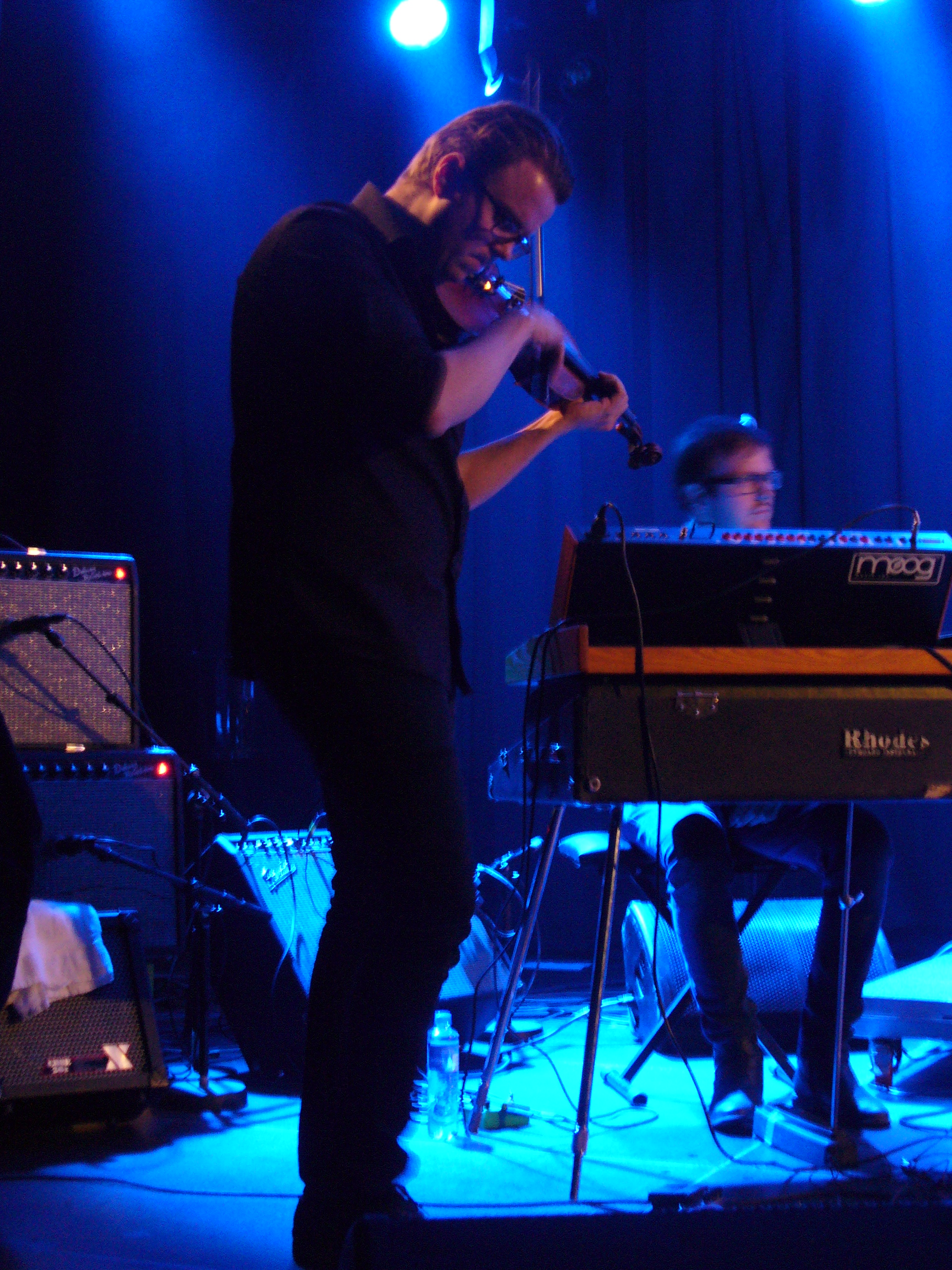
Kvernbergn at Vossajazz 2014.

Kvernberg was born in Fræna Municipality. He began to play folk music at an early age and was classically trained through the municipal music school. His first record release was with the band Fear of flying in 1995. Two years later, when he was 16, he began playing jazz, and was educated on the Jazz program at Trondheim musikkonservatorium (2001–03).

Kvernberg spontaneously became known after a meeting with Hot Club de Norvège in 2000 during the annual Django Festival in Oslo, where he actually jammed with Toots Thielemans. This gave rise to release album Hot Club de Norvege presenting Ola Kvernberg and Jimmy Rosenberg (2000), the solo release Ola Kvernberg (2001), as well as participation on the record Angelo is back in town with Angelo Debarre (2001), which he also played with at the Django Festival in January 2002. In April 2002, Ola was soloist on Jon Larsen's jazz symphony White Night Stories, together with Hot Club de Norvège and Tromsø Symphony Orchestra, and on two recordings with this project.

== His own trio ==
Ola Kvernberg Trio with Steinar Raknes (bass) and Doug Raney (guitar) released the album Cats and Doug (Hot Club Records, 2002). Erik Nylander (drums) replaced Raney on the production of Eboue Seck's Wolof Experience at (Moldejazz 2005). On Vossajazz 2006, they play with Vidar Busk, accompanied by Håkon Mjåset Johansen (drums). The trio (with Nylander/Raknes) released the album Night (Jazzland, 2006) with the Kvernberg's own compositions. People was published in 2009. The commissioned work Liarbird to the Jazz 2010 was released. For the record Liarbird he won the Spellemannprisen 2011 in the class jazz.

== Other collaborations ==
He played with Niels-Henning Ørsted Pedersen and Philip Catherine at Moldejazz 2004, and was involved in the Ingebrigt Håker Flaten Quintet, the trio Gammalgrass with Stian Carstensen and Ole Morten Vågan, in The Scarlatti Ensemble with Kim Myhr, Eirik Hegdal and Marianne Baudouin Lie, with Siri Gjære's Trønderhøns and as a guest in Banjovi with Finn Guttormsen, Stian Carstensen, Haakon Askeland, Kjartan Iversen and Knut Hem. In 2007 he was with Thomas Dybdahl on tour. In 2008 Kvernberg contributed on the Jon Larsen's The Jimmy Carl Black Story.

He is portrayed in the Stein Kagge's book Fra Satchmo til Ola Kvernberg (2001), and he is the brother of traditional musician Jorun Marie Kvernberg (1979).

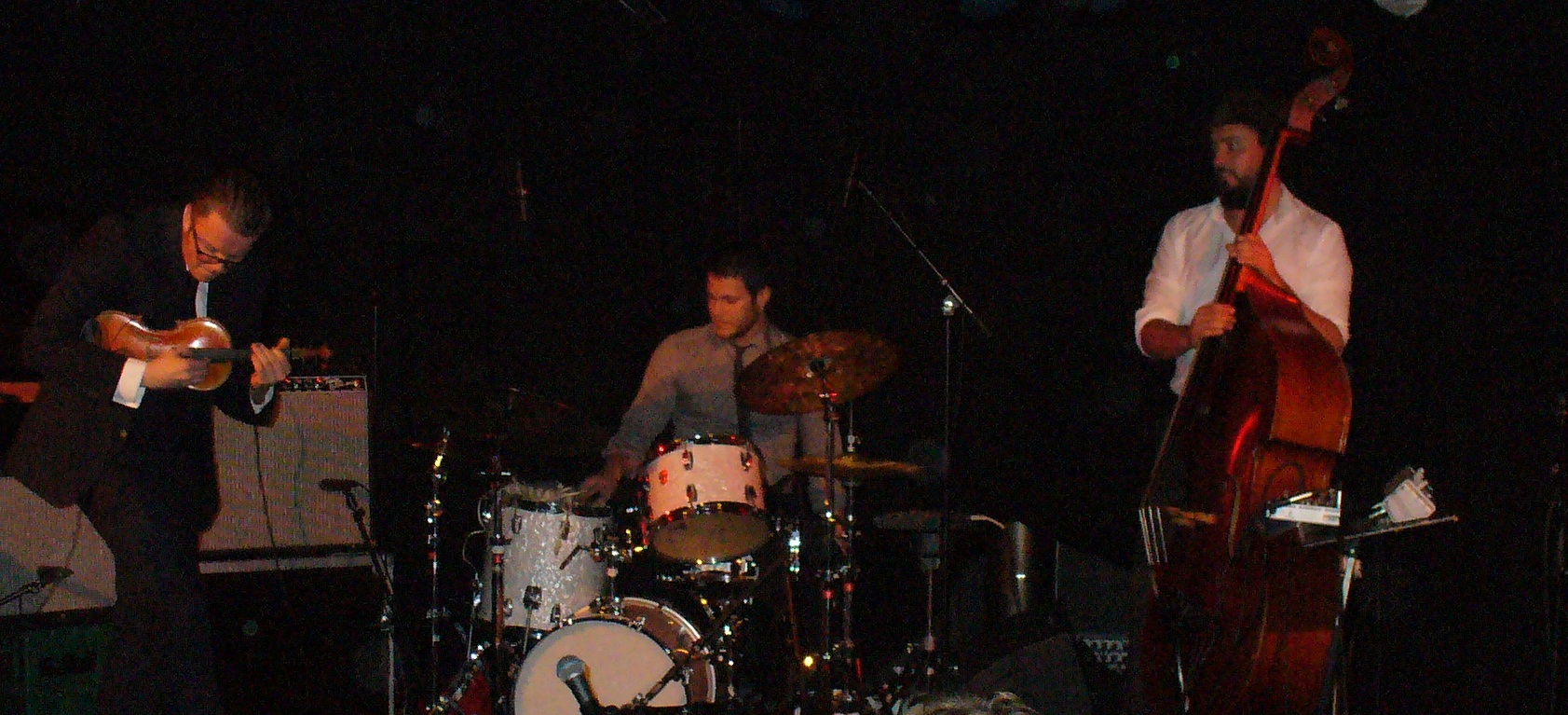
Ola Kvernberg, Erik Nylander and Steinar Raknes with the Jazzland Community at the Jazz club Sardinen, USF Verftet in November 2012.

== Honors ==
- 2010: Amanda Award, nominated, in the category best soundtrack for the movie Nord.
- 2011: Spellemannprisen (Norwegian Grammys) winner, Jazz album of the year, for Liarbird
- 2012: Kongsberg Jazz Award - winner
- 2013: Kanon Award winner, in the category best soundtrack for the movie Jag etter vind
- 2013: Amanda Award winner, in the category best soundtrack for the movie Jag etter vind
- 2015: Grand Scores nominated, in the category "Best Electro-Acoustic Score" for the movie Two Raging Grannies
- 2015: Kanon Award nominated, in the category best soundtrack for the movie Two Raging Grannies
- 2015: Spellemannprisen (Norwegian Grammys) nominated, Jazz album of the year, for The Mechanical Fair
- 2015: Spellemannprisen (Norwegian Grammys) nominated, mixed genres album of the year, for Obsolete Music 1
- 2016: Kanon Award nominated, in the category best soundtrack for the movie Staying Alive

== Discography ==
=== Solo albums ===
- 2001: Violin (Hot Club Records)
- 2014: Mechanical Fair (Jazzland Recordings), commission for Kongsberg Jazz Festival 2013, including with the Trondheim Soloists
- 2017: Steamdome (Grappa Music)
- 2021: Steamdome II: The Hypogean
- 2024: Steamdome III: Beyond the End

Within Ola Kvernberg Trio

- 2002: Cats and Doug (Hot Club Records), feat. the guitarist Doug Raney
- 2006: Night Driver (Jazzland Recordings), performing Kvernberg's compositions
- 2009: Folk (Jazzland Recordings)
- 2013: Northern Tapes (Jazzland Recordings)

Within Liarbird

- 2011: Liarbird (Jazzland Recordings), the commissioned work, live from Moldejazz 2010 including Bergmund Waal Skaslien (viola), Eirik Hegdal (saxophone), Mathias Eick (trumpet), Håkon Kornstad (saxophone), Ingebrigt Håker Flaten and Ole Morten Vågan (bass), as well as Erik Nylander and Torstein Lofthus (drums)

Within Grand General, quintet including Erlend Slettevoll, Even Helte Hermansen, Kenneth Kapstad and Trond Frønes

- 2013: Grand General (Rune Grammofon)

=== Collaborations ===
With Hot Club de Norvege

- 2000: Hot Club De Norvege Featuring Ola Kvernberg and Jimmy Rosenberg (Hot Club Records)
- 2005: White Night Live (Hot Club Records), feat. Ola Kvernberg and Tromsø Symphony Orchestra

Within Ingebrigt Håker Flaten Quintet

- 2006: Quintet (Jazzland Recordings)
- 2008: The Year Of The Boar (Jazzland Recordings)

Within Trondheim Jazz Orchestra

- 2006: Tribute (MNJ Records), feat. Vigleik Storaas
- 2007: Live In Oslo (MNJ Records), feat. Maria Kannegaard Trio

Within Team Hegdal sextet including Eirik Hegdal, André Roligheten, Rune Nergaard, Mattias Ståhl and Gard Nilssen

- 2011: Vol 2 (Øra Fonogram), including additional

Within Ingebrigt Håker Flaten Chicago Sextet, including Dave Rempis, Frank Rosaly, Jason Adasiewicz and Jeff Parker

- 2012: Ingebrigt Håker Flaten Chicago Sextet Live At Jazzfest Saalfelden (Tektite Records Co.Operative)

Within Gammalgrass

- 2013: Obsolete Music 1 (Division Records)

Within the trio Kirsti, Ola & Erik

- 2015: Rags & Silk (Name Music & Publishing)

=== Film music ===
- 2010: Nord Film Music (Jazzland Recordings), trio including Andreas Aase (guitars, mandolin, dobro) and Stian Carstensen (banjo), Ola Kvernbergs Filmmscore for the critically acclaimed Erlend Loe movie Nord
- 2010: Eksperimentet, a Danish drama film written and directed by Louise Friedberg, starring Ellen Hillingsø.
- 2013: Soundtrack for the movie Jag etter vind.

Awards
Preceded by Elephant9	Recipient of the Jazz Spellemannprisen; 2011	Succeeded by Sidsel Endresen and Stian Westerhus
Preceded by Arve Henriksen	Recipient of the Kongsberg Jazz Award; 2012	Succeeded by Håkon Mjåset Johansen
