= Hot Club Records =

Norwegian record label

- Founded: 1982
- Founder: Jon Larsen
- Genre: Jazz
- Country of origin: Norway
- Location: Oslo

Hot Club Records is a jazz record label established 1982, by guitarist Jon Larsen in Oslo, Norway. The label has released over 350 CDs, DVDs and books, mostly jazz related.

Some artists on Hot Club Records: Chet Baker, Philip Catherine, Warne Marsh, and the poet Jan Erik Vold.

In 1988 Hot Club Records established the Vintage Guitar Series, which became influential on the international renaissance of the gypsy jazz, inspired by the music of Django Reinhardt. Some artists in this series are Stephane Grappelli, Stochelo Rosenberg, Angelo Debarre, Jon Larsen, Andreas Oberg, and Jimmy Rosenberg.

In 2006 Hot Club Records established the label Zonic Entertainment, with music inspired by Frank Zappa. Some artists on this label are Tommy Mars, Arthur Barrow, Jon Larsen, Jimmy Carl Black, Bruce Fowler, Walt Fowler, and Vinnie Colaiuta.

== Catalog ==
- Hot Club de Norvège, Old, new, borrowed & blue (HCR 1)
- Four Roosters, Rooster blues (HCR 2, 1982, 2009)
- Erik Wøllo, Where it all begins (HCR 4)
- Morten Gunnar Larsen, Echo of spring (HCR 6, 1983)
- Warne Marsh sextet, IN norway/Sax of a kind (HCR 7)
- Magni Wentzel, Sofies plass (HCR 8)
- Anne-Marie Giørtz Quartet, Breaking out (HCR 9)
- Balkansemblet Balkan samlet (HCR 11)
- Hot Club de Norvège & Ivar Brodahl, Gloomy (HCR 12)
- Winds Hot & Cool, Nostalgia up to date (HCR 13)
- AHA!!, Keep nose in front (HCR 14)
- Erik Wøllo, Dreams of pyramid (HCR 15)
- Laila Dalseth & Louis Stewart, Daydreams (HCR 16, 1984)
- Et cetera (med bl.a. Ingeborg Hungnes & Arne Nøst), Reinsdyr over vidda (1985)
- Lars Martin Myhre & Slagen Storband, Bak speilet (HCR 18, 1984)
- Thorgeir Stubø & Doug Raney, Everything we love (HCR 19)
- Peter Opsvik/Per Frydenlund/Svein Gusrud/Jon Larsen, Guitar, sax, guitar, bass (HCR 20)
- Per Husby Orchestra, Dedications (HCR CD 21, 1985)
- Odd-Arne Jacobsen, Vakkert land (HCR 22)
- Kenneth Sivertsen, Amalgamation (HCR 23, 1985)
- Thorgeir Stubø, Flight (HCR 25, 1988)
- Tor Halmrast & Tor Åge Bringsværd, Glassberget (HCR 27)
- Bent Erlandsen, Bel arni (HCR 28)
- Nils Økland & Bjørnar Andresen, NØ & BA (HCR 29)
- Jan Erik Vold, Den dagen Lady døde (HCR CD 30, 1986/2003)
- Ophelia Ragtime Orchestra, Echoes from the Snowball Club (HCR 32)
- Caledonia Jazzband, Moods of New Orleans (HCR 33)
- Hot Club de Norvège, Swing de Paris (HCR CD 34, 1986)
- Libido (Tor Eide, Henrik Hellstenius, Inge Norum & Tellef Øgrim), Libido (HCR 35)
- New Cool Quartet, New Cool Quartet (HCR 36, 1982)
- Caledonia Jazzband & Wendell Brunious, Walkin' (HCR 38, 1987)
- R & B Express, Westbound (HCR 39)
- Robert Normann, String swing, vol. 1-2, String swing/Sigarett stomp/Tricky fingers/Perpetum Mobile (HCR CD 40/41/42/43)
- Warne Marsh, For the time being (HCR 44, 1987)
- Baro Ferret, Swing Valses d'hier et d'aujourd'hui (HCR CD 45)
- Matelo Ferret, Tziganskaia and other rare recordings 1960-78 (HCR 46)
- Karl Seglem, Poems for trio (HCR 49)
- Jan Erik Vold & Chet Baker, Blåmann! Blåmann! (HCR CD 50, 1988)
- Søyr, Vectors (HCR CD 52, 1988)
- Øyvind Rauset, 13 impossible dances + 1 improbable! (HCR 53, 1988)
- Røshnes Jazz Band, New Orleans style (HCR 54)
- Angelo Debarre Trio, Gypsy guitars (HCR CD 56)
- Ketil Bjørnstad, Karen Mowat-suite (HCR CD 57, 1989)
- Stochelo Rosenberg, Seresta (HCR CD 59)
- Jon Eberson, Backhand smash (HCR 60)
- Balkansemblet Kvikk sand (HCR 61)
- Czech-Norwegian Band with Benny Bailey, Jazznost (HCR CD 62, 1990)
- Raya Bielenberg, Progeja! (HCR 63, 1990)
- Arbat (Pascal de Loutchek m.fl.), Chantez tziganes (HCR CD 65)
- Joseph Reinhardt, Live in Paris fra 1966 (HCR CD 66)
- Fapy Lafertin Quintet, Fleur de lavende (HCR CD 67)
- Petro Ivanovich, Romano drom (HCR 68, 1991)
- Jon Larsen, Superstrings (HCR CD 69)
- Jan Erik Vold, Sannheten om trikken er at den brenner (HCR CD 70, 1990)
- Caledonia Jazzband med Norbert Susemihl, Is you is or is you ain't (HCR CD 72, 1991)
- Diverse artister, Sampler (HCR 73)
- Hot Club de Norvège & Ivar Brodahl, The best of (HCR CD 74)
- Jan Erik Vold, Pytt pytt blues (HCR CD 75, 1992)
- Biswajit Roy Chowdhury, Sarod (HCR CD 76, 1996)
- Hot Club de Norvège, Hot club and Angelo (HCR 80, 1991)
- Jon Larsen/Pascal de Loutchek/Stian Mevik, Guitaresque (HCR CD 81, 1994)
- Hot Club de Norvège & Jimmy Rosenberg (m.fl.), Swinging with Jimmy (HCR 82, 1994)
- Hot Club de Norvège, Portrait of Django (HCR CD 83)
- Jon Larsen & Hot Club de Norvège, Vertavo live in concert (HCR CD 84, 2006)
- Robert Normann, The best of (HCR CD 85)
- Jon Larsen, The swinging guitar of... vgs (HCR 88, 96)
- Diverse artister, Django Festival 1, Gypsy swing today (HCR 89)
- Jan Erik Vold, Obstfelder live på Rebekka West (HCR CD 90, 1994)
- Girl Talk, Talkin' jazz (HCR CD 91, 1996)
- Magni Wentzel, Turn out the stars (HCR CD 92, 1997)
- Søren Bøgelund's Mirakelband, Me (HCR CD 93, 1997)
- Hot Club de Norvège, the Vertavo Quartet & Ulf Wakenius, Vertavo (HCR 96)
- Caledonia Jazzband & Geoff Bull, Creole nights (HCR CD 97, 1997)
- Walter Malosetti & Jon Larsen, Stringtime in Buenos Aires, Tribute to Aleman (HCR CD 98)
- Diverse artister, Django Festival 2, Gypsy swing today (HCR 99, 2002)
- Jan Erik Vold, Her er huset som Per bygde (HCR CD 100, 1996)
- Stéphane Grappelli Trio, Live at Cosmopolite (fra 1994, HCR CD 101)
- Hot Club de Norvège med Babik Reinhardt, Jimmy Rosenberg & Romane, Hot shots (HCR CD 102)
- Torgeir Rebolledo Pedersen & Gunnar Germeten Jr., Ni sanger for en dødfødt katt (HCR CD 103, 1997)
- Kevin Dean Quintet, Over at Ola's (HCR CD 104, 1997)
- Finn Hauge, Close to my heart (HCR CD 105, 1998)
- Walter Malosetti, Stringtime in Buenos Aires (HCR 106)
- Ricardo Pellican trio, Gypsy air (HCR 107)
- Diverse artister, Django Festival 3, Gypsy swing today (HCR 109, 2004)
- Egil Kapstad, Jan Erik Vold & friends, Storytellers (HCR CD 110, 1998)
- Watti Rosenberg, Sonnekai (HCR 112, 1999)
- Angelo Debarre, Caprice (HCR 116, 1998)
- Jimmy Rosenberg, The one and only Jimmy Rosenberg (HCR 117, 1997)
- Jean-Philippe Watremez & Co, Mosaique (HCR 118, 1998)
- Diverse artister, Django Festival 4, Gypsy swing today (HCR CD 119, 2006)
- Hot Club de Norvège, Moreno m.fl. (HCR 120)
- Marvin Charles Trio, M.C.Trio (HCR CD 121, 1998)
- Hot Club de Norvège, Three hot sessions (HCR 123)
- Jon Larsen & Pascal de Loutchek, Larsen & Loutchek (HCR 124)
- Jimmy Rosenberg, Portrait of Jimmy (HCR 125)
- Hilde Hefte, Round Chet's midnight (HCR CD 126, 1999)
- Angelo Debarre, Portrait (HCR 127)
- Hot Club de Norvège, presents Ola Kvernberg (HCR 130)
- Ola Fjellvikaas, Street of dreams (HCR CD 131, 2000)
- Jon Larsen, The next step (HCR CD 132, 2003)
- Hilde Hefte, Playsong – the music of Bill Evans (HCR CD 133, 2001)
- Street swingers (Erik Amundsen, Erling Wicklund & Jan Berger), About time (HCR CD 134, 2001)
- Bodil Niska, First song (HCR CD 135, 2000)
- Ola Kvernberg, Ola Kvernberg (HCR 136, 2000)
- Jon Larsen, The next step (new version) (HCR CD 137, 2003)
- Hallgeir Pedersen trio, West coast blues (HCR CD 138, 2002)
- Hot Club de Norvège, The best of (HCR CD 139, 2003)
- Hot Club de Norvège, Angelo is back in town (HCR 140, 2001)
- Ola Kvernberg Trio, Cats and Doug (HCR CD 141, 2002)
- Rune Nicolaysen Trio, Fuglen (HCR CD 202, 2003)
- Eivin Sannes & Inge Stangvik, Together again (HCR CD 142, 2001)
- Diverse artister, Bjørn Johansen in memoriam(HCR CD 143, 2003)
- Hot Club de Suede & Jimmy Rosenberg, Live (HCR CD 144, 2003)
- Jimmy Rosenberg, Django's tiger (HCR CD 146, 2003)
- Django Reinhardt & Quintette du Hot Club de France, Best of (HCR 147, 2009)
- Andreas Öberg, Andreas, Ritary and Yorgui (HCR CD 148, 2004)
- Reiner Voet & Pigalle44, Swing for bop (HCR 149)
- Hot Club de Norvège, Ola Kvernberg & Tromsø Symfoniorkester, White night stories (HCR CD 150, 2002)
- Hot Club de Norvège, Ola Kvernberg & Tromsø Symfoniorkester, White night short stories (HCR CD 151, 2003)
- Jimmy Rosenberg, Swinging with Jimmy (HCR CD 153, 2005)
- Hot Club de Norvège, Ola Kvernberg & Tromsø Symfoniorkester, White night live (HCR CD 155, 2002)
- Diverse artister, Django Festival 5 (HCR 159, 2007)
- Hot Club de Norvège & Camelia-kvartetten, Hot cats in concert (HCR DVD 160, 2005)
- Jon Larsen, Luna suite (HCR CD 161, 2006)
- Andreas Öberg, Young jazz guitarist (HCR CD 162, 2005)
- Spirits of Gypsy, Gypsy swing (HCR CD 163, 2006)
- Jimmy Rosenberg, Trio (HCR CD 170, 2004)
- Hot Club de Norvège, A stranger in town (Bjørn Vidar Solli) (HCR CD 171, 2004)
- Marian Petrescu Quartet, Body and soul (HCR CD 172, 2006)
- Stian Carstensen & Jimmy Rosenberg, Rose room (HCR CD 180, 2005)
- Hot Club de Norvège & Camelia-kvartetten, Hot cats (HCR CD 181, 2005)
- Andreas Öberg, Solo (HCR 182, 2006)
- Jan Erik Vold, Synger svadaåret inn (HCR 185, 2005)
- Trio Romen med Valentina Ponomareva, The russian gypsy queen (HCR 190, 2008)
- Jon Larsen Quartet, Short stories from Catalonia (HCR 196, 2005)
- Andreas Öberg med Marian Petrescu, Live in concert (HCR DVD 192)
- Rêve Bohème, The best of (HCR 197, 2006)
- Diverse artister, Hot Club Records, 25th anniversary (HCR 200, 2006)
- Chriss Campion med Flèche d'Or, Nature boy (HCR 202, 2007)
- Denis Chang, Deeper than you think (HCR 203, 2010)
- Knut Reiersrud & Nappy Brown, Roots of Scandinavian blues (HCR 215, 2009)
- Jon Larsen, featuring Jimmy Carl Black (HCR 217, 2007)
- Hot Club de Norvège, Django music (HCR 219, 2008)
- Chriss Campion, Souvenirs med Aurelien Trigo, Denis Chang & Alex Bellegarde (HCR 220, 2008).
- Jimmy Rosenberg, Best of (HCR 221, 2008)
- Caledonia Jazzband, Street people (HCR 223, 2009)
- Jon Larsen, Portrait (HCR 224, 2009)
- Jan Erik Vold & Egil Kapstad, Drømmemakeren sa (HCR 230, 2008)
- Hot Club de Norvège, Best of 1979-2009 (HCR 239, 2009)
- Rosenberg Trio, Seresta – 20 years anniversary (HCR 256, 2009)

=== 2000 series ===
- Per Frydenlund, Alene dans (HCR CD 2002, 1998)
- Dj Falk & The Arctic Dance Experience, The Arctic Dance Experience (HCR CD 2003)
- Sichia (Gorm Helfjord & Iver Bjurgren), Duende (HCR CD 2004, 1999)
- Jens Arne Molvær, September song (HCR CD 2005, 1998)
- Magni Wentzel sextet, Porgy & Bess (HCR CD 2006, 2000)
- Tore Morten Andreassen, Accordiomania (HCR CD 2007, 2001)
- Sølvi Hansen, Meet sir Jones (HCR CD 2008, 2000)
- Anders Aarum trio, The lucky strike (HCR 2009, 2000)
- Louisiana Jazzband, 20-year anniversary (HCR CD 2010, 2001)
- Eckhard Baur, Movements (HCR CD 2012, 2002)
- Knut Halmrast, Little pillow (HCR CD 2013, 2003)
- Majken Christiansen, Song for my father (HCR CD 2014, 2001)
- Frevo (Andreas Karlsen & Pål Granum), Whisky (HCR CD 2015, 2002)
- Savoy Stompers, Keepin' out of mischief (HCR CD 2016, 2002)
- Bengalo, Vir (HCR CD 2017, 2004)
- Magni Wentzel, Divergence (HCD CD 2018, 2002)
- Halvard Kausland/Hans Mathisen Quartet, Good bait (HCR CD 2019, 2002)
- Odd Riisnæs, Another breeze (HCR CD 2021, 2003)
- Egil Kapstad/Egil Johansen Quartet, Friends (HCR CD 2022, 2004)
- Majken Christiansen, Re:porter (HCR CD 2024, 2003)
- Fou Rire, Out of manouche (HCR CD 2025, 2003)
- Jan Erik Kongshaug Quartet, All these years (HCR CD 2027, 2003)
- Egil Kapstad, Wolfvoices (HCR CD 2028, 2003)
- Hilde Hefte, Hildes bossahefte (HCR CD 2029, 2003)
- Hallgeir Pedersen Trio, Wistful (HCR CD 2031, 2004)
- Roar Vangen, Streng (HCR CD 2033, 2004)
- Duo Gvito (Gjermund Titlestad & Marius Gundersen), Xaranga (HCR 2034)
- Oslo String Swing Artilleri, Swing 05 (HCR 2035)

=== Zonic Entertainment series ===
- Jon Larsen & Tommy Mars, Strange News From Mars (ZEN 2001)
- Jon Larsen & Jimmy Carl Black, The Jimmy Carl Black Story (ZEN 2003/04)
- Marvista Philharmonic No Forest Fire (ZEN 2005)
- Tommy Mars, & Jon Larsen Willie Nickerson's Egg (ZEN 2006, HCR 250 2009)
- Don Preston Colliding Galaxys (ZEN 2007)
- Bunk Gardner The Bunk Gardner Story – Part 1 (ZEN 2008)
- Bunk Gardner The Bunk Gardner Story – Part 2 (ZEN 2009)

=== 1000 series ===
- Mari Boine, Jaskavoudda Maini (HCR 1001, 1985)
- Sabelnatt (Bjørn Freberg, Martin Borgnes, Per Ole Hagen, Øyvind Melinen), Noc Šavlí (HCR CD 1002, 2004)
- Nils Økland & Oslo Tangoforening, Årsrapport (HCR 1003, 1986)
- Skinn og Bein, Knaus – en samtidscollage (HCR CD 1005, 1989)
- Eli Storbekken, Glimt (HCR 1006)
- André Danielsen, Kvinner og kanari (HCR CD 1009, 1989)
- Oslo Groove Company, Anno 1990 (HCR 1010)
- Svein Nymo & Nymoderne, Bygdefusion fra Rastafaret (HCR 1011, 1991)
