= Persikov =

Persikov may refer to:

- Profesor Vladimir Persikov, the protagonist from the novel The Fatal Eggs by Mikhail Bulgakov
- "Professor Persikov", a composition from the Avanti! album by Biel Ballester Trio
- Peršíkov, a village in Czech Republic
