= Badendyck =

Badendyck is a Norwegian surname. Notable people with the surname include:

- Johan Badendyck (1902–1973), Norwegian long-distance runner
- Richard Badendyck (born 1942), Norwegian singer and pianist
