= Le Chant du Monde =

French music publishing house

- Parent company: Music Sales Group
- Founded: 1938
- Founder: Léon Moussinac
- Country of origin: France
- Publication types: Music
- Official website: lechantdumonde.com [archive]

Le Chant du Monde was a French music publishing house. It was created in 1938 by Léon Moussinac and was supported in the beginning by classical composers Georges Auric, Arthur Honegger, Charles Koechlin, Darius Milhaud, Francis Poulenc, Albert Roussel, and conductors Roger Désormière and Manuel Rosenthal.

Le Chant du Monde is particularly known worldwide for having gathered the first collection of traditional music and ethnographic recordings. It commissioned composers to transcribe French oral traditions and music alike.

After World War II, the label acquired les Éditions sociales internationales and became the French editor of Russian composers Sergei Prokofiev, Dmitri Shostakovich, and Aram Khachaturian, and also the first producer of Léo Ferré, Mouloudji, Cora Vaucaire, then Colette Magny, Atahualpa Yupanqui, Uña Ramos and occasionally worked with Glenmor, Albert Marcœur, or Paolo Conte.

The company merged in 1993 with Arlesian-based French distributor and music label Harmonia Mundi, which was more focused on classical music.

They went on to publish classics old and new: chanson (Léo Ferré, Édith Piaf, Charles Trenet, Julos Beaucarne, Éric Lareine), gypsy jazz (Django Reinhardt, Stéphane Grappelli, Tchavolo Schmitt, Raphaël Faÿs, Angelo Debarre, Biréli Lagrène, Florin Niculescu, Steeve Laffont, Yorgui Loeffler), French jazz, children's and traditional music, and classic American rock and roll (Elvis Presley, Jerry Lee Lewis, Fats Domino, Bill Haley, Gene Vincent, Little Richard, Chuck Berry, Buddy Holly, Carl Perkins).

In November 2016, Music Sales (now Wise Music Group) acquired Le Chant du Monde's music publishing division from the PIAS Group.
