= Stig Hvalryg =

Norwegian jazz upright bass player

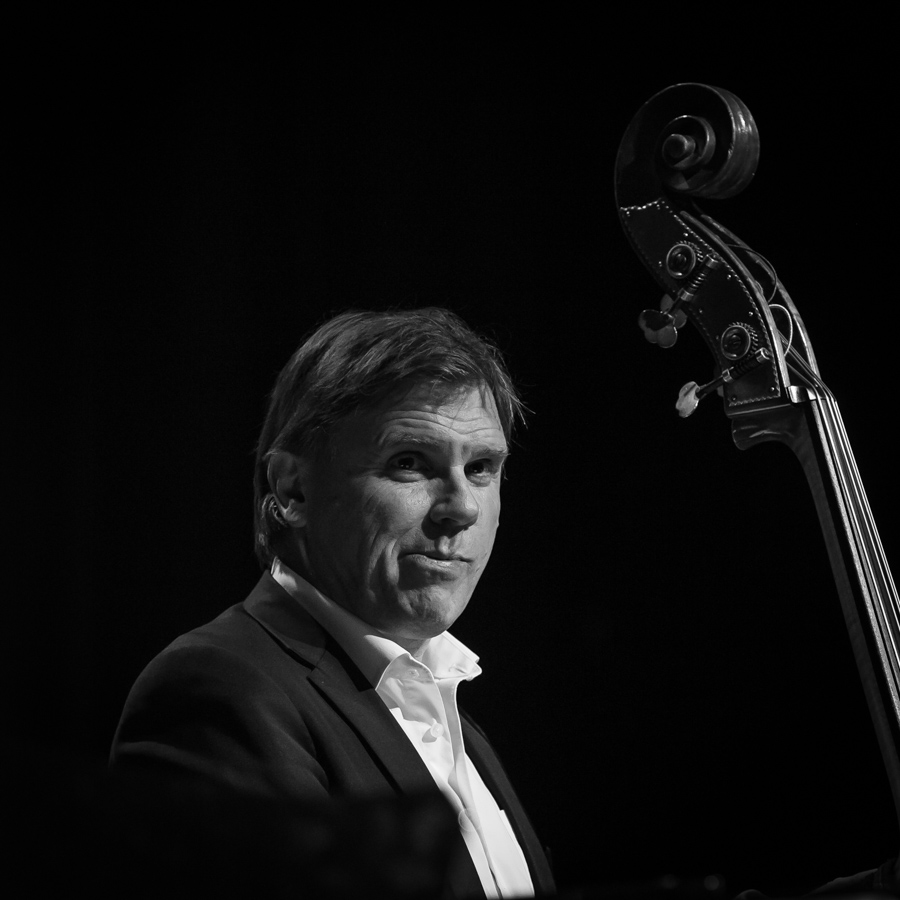
- Stig Hvalryg at Oslo jazzfestival (2015).

Background information
- Born: 15 July 1960 (age 65); Oslo
- Origin: Norway
- Genres: Jazz
- Occupations: Musician, composer
- Instrument: Upright bass

Stig Hvalryg (born 15 July 1960 in Oslo, Norway) is a Norwegian jazz musician (upright bass), known from several orchestras and recordings, and a profile on the Oslo Jazz scene in recent years.

== Career ==
He plays within Bodil Niska Quartet, "Rickard Badendyck Quartet", in "Willy Andresen Quartet", "Frode Thingnæs Quartet", "Michael Block Trio", "Tore Sandnæs Trio", with Inge Stangvik/Eivin Sannes, as well as within the Eivin Sannes "Dexter Gordon Project". He has participated in releases by Per Høglend Quintet album Psychiatri Meets Jazz(2001) and Per Høglend Septett album Mind And Music (2003), Ingar Kristansen's The Sinatra songbook (2001), Anne Landes Largoland (2005) and Per Husby/Anne Lande's Sakte sanger.

Together with Sture Janson, Jens Fossum and Kåre Garnes he played within "Fire bassister", who performed the tribute to Erik Amundsen in 2006. At "Oslo Jazzfestival" 2006 he joined the quartet of Majken Christiansen in "Tribute to Ella Fitzgerald". He also performed with David Arthur Skinner and Bjørn Vidar Solli in the Diagonal Jazzband and David Skinner og Bjørn Vidar Solli Quartet, among others at Lancelot in Asker, Norway and Swing'n'Sweet Jazzklubb in Bergen, Norway.

== Discography (in selection) ==
- 2001: The Sinatra Songbook, with Ingar Kristansen
- 2001: Psychiatri Meets Jazz, within Per Høglend Quintet
- 2003: Mind And Music, within Per Høglend Septett
- 2004: That's All (Jazzavdelingen), with Richard Badendyck
- 2005: Largoland (Park Grammofon), with Anne Lande
- 2006: Sakte Sanger (Park Grammofon), with Anne Lande & Per Husby
- 2007: Comes Love (Park Grammofon), with Majken Christiansen
- 2008: Nora – For Swingende!!! (Park Grammofon), with Nora Brockstedt
- 2010: Peace (BadenMusic), with Richard Badendyck
- 2011: A Day at The Opera (Ponca Jazz Records), with Antonsen, Hvalryg, Olstad Trio
