= Liv Stoveland =

Norwegian soprano and singing teacher (born 1965)

Liv Stoveland Woie
- Born: Liv Gudrun Stoveland; 12 March 1965 (age 61); Lillesand, Aust-Agder
- Origin: Norway
- Genres: Soprano, jazz
- Occupations: Musician, music teacher
- Instrument: Vocals
- Label: Ponca Jazz Records
- Website: www.livstoveland.no

Liv Gudrun Stoveland Woie (born 12 March 1965 in Lillesand, Norway) is a Norwegian soprano and singing teacher.

== Biography ==
Stoveland was raised in a musical family. This brought her to a classical education as soprano at the Agder musikkonservatorium, and eventually a diploma from the Norwegian Academy of Music. She has participated in numerous productions in musical genres such as opera and church music, and has also taken up jazz.

She has recited solo concerts and has performed as soloist in works such as Handel's "Messiah", Bach's "Christmas Oratorio" and "Requiem" by Brahms. She has a large repertoire in songs and lieder, and has sung Grieg, Sibelius, R. Strauss and Hugo Wolf numerous times. In recent years she has mostly sung classical baroque music and toured with "Stabat Mater" by Vivaldi on the Amalfi Coast in Italy in autumn 2013.

Her debut album Close your eyes was released in 2009. A second album is on the way 2015.

== Discography ==
- 2009: Close Your Eyes (Ponca Jazz Records)
- 2016: Solitary Moon (Ponca Jazz)
