= Richard Badendyck =

Norwegian singer (born 1942)

Carl Richard Badendyck (born 1942) is a Norwegian Jazz singer and pianist, that in his time was strong in Decathlon.

== Biography ==
Badendyck has released three solo albums, That’s All (2005), Peace (2010) and Lover (2015). The second album Peace containing American standards and with his son Dag Richard Badendyck as pianist on a song, got good reception in the media. The latest album with songs from «The American Songbook» with strings arranged by Odd Riisnæs who also plays saxophone, while Stig Hvalryg playing upright bass and Sigmund Thorp conducting the string orchestra. There are for the most standards, except Badendycks own tune, "Lover". It has been done with respect for the masters, and sounds much more robust than for example Kurt Elling and Gregory Porter, or for that matter Jimmy Scott.

== Discography ==
- 2004: That's All (Jazzavdelingen)
- 2010: Peace (BadenMusic), with Stig Hvalryg
- 2015: Lover (BadenMusic), with Stig Hvalryg and Odd Riisnæs
