= Biel Ballester =

Spanish gypsy jazz guitarist

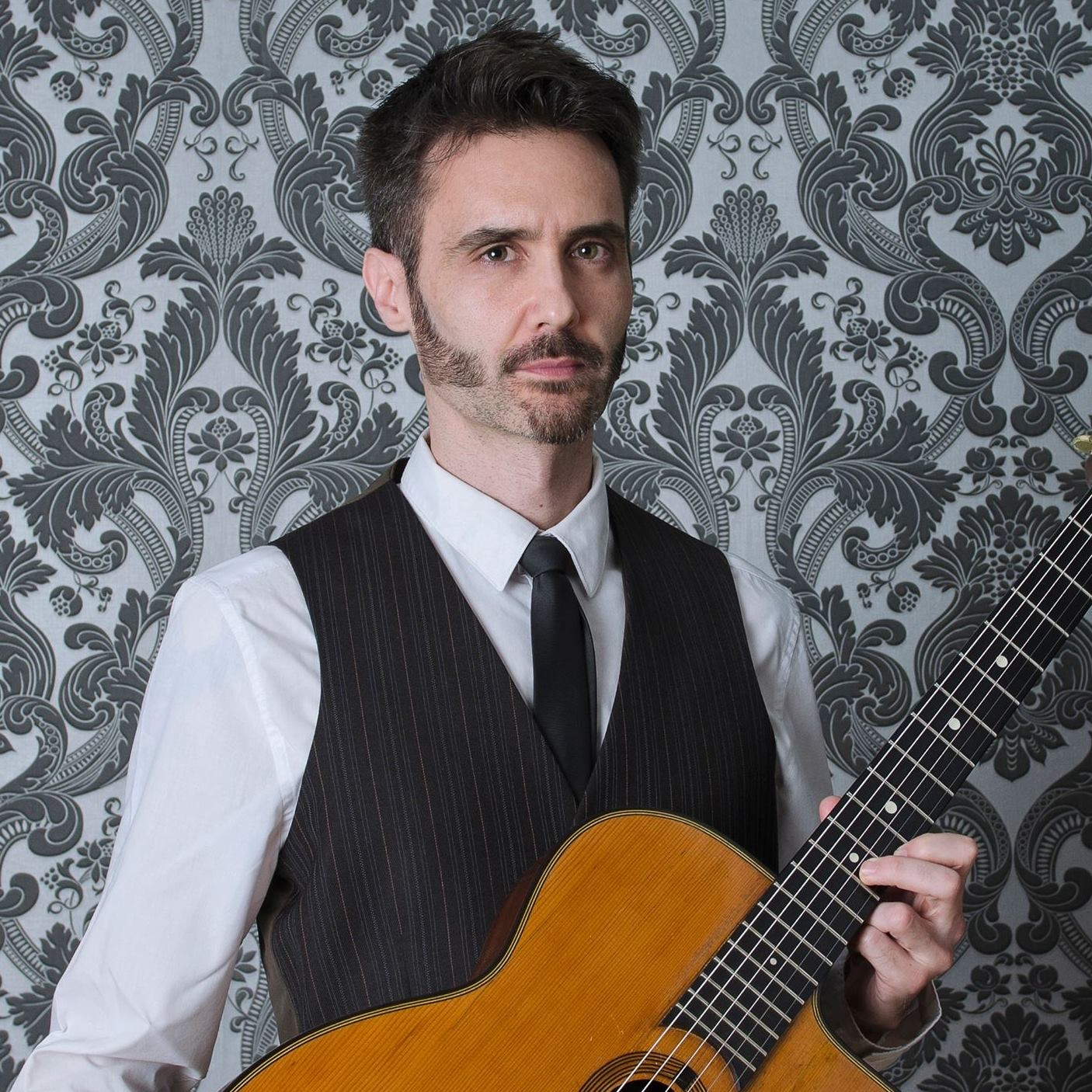
- Biel Ballester (2016)

Background information
- Born: 1974 (age 50–51); Mallorca, Spain
- Genres: Gypsy jazz
- Occupation: Musician
- Instrument: Guitar

Biel Ballester (born 1974) is a gypsy jazz guitarist from Mallorca, Spain. He contributed music to the Woody Allen film Vicky Cristina Barcelona.

== Biography ==
Biel Ballester is from Mallorca in Spain. He studied classical guitar under Àlex Garrobé at the Escola D'Arts Musicals Luthier in Barcelona. He discovered the music of Django Reinhardt at age 18, and his music is a fusion of gypsy jazz and Spanish music. With Leo Hipaucha (rhythm guitar) and Oriol González (double bass) he formed the Biel Ballester trio. He was introduced to Woody Allen during the filming of Vicky Cristina Barcelona. Allen, a jazz clarinet player, played frequently with Ballester during this time and included two of his tracks on the soundtrack of the film.

== Discography ==
=== As leader ===
- Echoes from Mallorca (Refined, 2005)
- Live in London (Le Q, 2006)
- Bistro de Barcelona (Refined, 2008)
- Jazz a l'Estudi (TVC Disc, 2011)
- Avanti! (Hot Club, 2011)
- Melodium Melodynamic (La Cupula Music, 2015)
- The Lowdown (Hot Club, 2015)

=== As sideman ===
- Jon Larsen, Short Stories from Catalonia, (Hot Club, 2013)
