= Strange News from Mars =

Studio album by Jon Larsen
- Released: November 13, 2007
- Recorded: March 12 – 16, 2007
- Studio: Cookie Factory, Oslo, Norway; Lotek Studio, Mar Vista, Los Angeles, California
- Genre: Jazz, rock
- Length: 42:05
- Label: Zonic Entertainment
- Producer: Jon Larsen

Jon Larsen chronology
Short Stories from Catalonia (2005)	Strange News from Mars (2007)	The Jimmy Carl Black Story (2008)

Strange News from Mars is an album by Norwegian guitarist Jon Larsen.

Professional ratings
Review scores
Source	Rating
Allmusic	3.5/5 stars
Verdens Gang	5/6 stars

== Review ==
Larsen is a Norwegian string swing guitar virtuoso, and not the one we would suspect to record music inspired by Frank Zappa. This production is noteworthy for the way it accurately resembles the more jazzy excursions of Zappa, as well as for the fact that former Mothers of Invention members Tommy Mars, Bruce Fowler, Arthur Barrow and Jimmy Carl Black appear on it. In fact, Barrow engineered the recording and Mars plays keyboards throughout, with Fowler adding some delicious trombone. Black primarily provides humorous interludes (like the «First Indian on Mars»), but the most interesting is how Larsen's core band including Ole Morten Vågan (bass), Håkon Mjåset Johansen (drums), Knut Reiersrud (guitar), and Rob Waring (marimba), are effectively referencing from and building on the Zappa oeuvre. Tracks like "Mutant Fromage", "The Secret Word for Today", "Conceptual Continuity on the Red Planet", to name some, share more than bizarre titles with the work of Zappa. Surprising time changes, strange changes, extended vamps, jumpy bursts of marimba, comedic interjections and Zappa-inspired textures will be familiar to those who recall the late composer's less-prickly (though no less creative) side. Tracks like "A Windy Day on Mars" and the reggae-tinged "Capt. Zurcon's Cranberry Cocktail" feature Larsen attempting to merge his Django-influenced guitar style with Zappa's modal blues improvisational guitar sound with brilliant results.

== Reception ==
The review by the Allmusic.com awarded the album 3.5 stars, and the review by the Norwegian newspaper Verdens Gang awarded the album 5 stars (dice).

== Track listing ==
1. Goodbye to Earth (1:18)
2. The Eons Are Closing (2:44)
3. Mutant Fromage (3:34)
4. Dachs Reduction (6:21)
5. A Windy Day on Mars (0:52)
6. Air Sculpting in Vacuum (3:24)
7. Strange News from Mars (0:16)
8. Cydonian Music (3:29)
9. Mars Under the Radar (0:20)
10. Cinderella on the Event Horizon of a Black Hole (2:12)
11. The Quilt (0:33)
12. The Secret Word for Today (2:40)
13. Conceptual Continuity on the Red Planet (2:34)
14. Norwegisher Schweinhund (0:20)
15. Capt. Zurcon's Cranberry Cocktail (2:11)
16. Unwanted Sexual Attention in Space (0:30)
17. Optional Entertainment in Zero Gravitation (2:16)
18. Tax the Churches (0:32)
19. Music Is the Best (3:47)
20. [Untitled Hidden Track] (2:12)

== Personnel ==
- Jon Larsen – guitar
- Tommy Mars – keyboards
- Rob Waring – marimba
- Knut Reiersrud – harmonica, guitar
- Bruce Fowler - trombone
- Ole Morten Vågan – double bass
- Håkon Mjåset Johansen – drums
- Jimmy Carl Black – vocals, percussion

== Credits ==
- Compositions & lyrics by Jon Larsen
- Engineered & mixed by Anders Svinndal
