= The Jimmy Carl Black Story =

Studio album by Jon Larsen
- Released: October 28, 2008
- Genre: Jazz
- Length: 133:16
- Label: Zonic Entertainment
- Producer: Jon Larsen

Jon Larsen chronology
Strange News from Mars (2007)	The Jimmy Carl Black Story (2008)	A Portrait of Jon Larsen (2009)

Professional ratings
Review scores
Source	Rating
Allmusic	3.5/5 stars

The Jimmy Carl Black Story is an album by Norwegian guitarist Jon Larsen.

== Review ==
The first CD is a Part One: «The Surrealistic Space Odyssey», one hour of music inspired by the life of Jimmy Carl Black. The musical landscape is a groove based R&B, laidback spacerock, zappaish jazz-rock, and even with some taste of Django, on this recording. Here is also the 20 minutes adventure of Capt. Zurcon and his crew on board the Spaceship BigEar III, on their way to the red planet Mars, and their problems with the sexually frustrated Martian (the Guacamole Queen), the mutant fromage, and a lurking whale (depicted on the cover).

The second CD is a Part Two: «The Rockumentary», with a 70 minutes documentary about Jimmy Carl Black, the “Indian of the group”. We learn about the start at the reservation, where Black grew up in Texas with his racist father, The Soul Giants, Frank Zappa, The Mothers of Invention, Janis Joplin, Jimi Hendrix, mafia connections, and the many years of sex, drugs and rock’n’roll, but we also learn the moving storie from a long, and unusual life in music. Jimmy Carl Black is a born storyteller, an intriguing and unique supplement to the told story of rock music, with a view of life in the “Mothers” from the inside. The stories of Black have a measured, folk wisdom quality to what he remembers. A must have in any Zappa & the Mothers of Invention collection.

== Track listing ==
Part One – The Surrealistic Space Odyssey

1. En Route (3:14)
2. Hi Boys and Girls, I'm Jimmy Carl Black (4:17)
3. An Early Glimpse of Planet Ruth (6:43)
4. Spaceship Bigear III (9:12)
5. Turn It On, Elliot (4:06)
6. A Helping Hand from Unca Mickey (3:23)
7. Opal, You Hot Little Bitch (3:15)
8. Jimmy Carl Black's Dachs Reduction (7:20)
9. Mayday from Space (2:43)
10. First Encounter in Space with a Real Martian (6:02)
11. Oh No, She's Trying to Rip My Spacesuit Open (4:23)
12. A Creature Is Lurking in the Shadow (4:18)
13. Jimmy-as-a-Ghost (3:40)

Part Two – The Rockumentary

1. My Name is Jimmy Carl Black (3:17)
2. The Atomic Gadget on Anthony/That Happened in Our Little Town (1:36)
3. No Trumpets in Rock 'n' Roll/The Keys (3:06)
4. California in 1964/In Walked Roy Estrada/The Soul Giants (8:42)
5. Then We Went to Hawaii/LSD (2:18)
6. Back to LA/Frenchy's a Go–Go/The Original Suzy Creamcheese (3:58)
7. San Francisco and Fillmore West/Freak Out Comes Out/Turn It On, Elliot! (3:31)
8. New York City/Absolutely Free/Off-Off Broadway at the Garrick Theater (6:10)
9. Europe 1967/Barbarella and Roger Vadim/Zappa Food Poisoned in Italy (4:15)
10. He Didn't Like Hippies/Jammin' with Jimi Hendrix (1:45)
11. Miami Pop Festival/Freak Out at The Cast Away Hotel/Arthur Brown (4:05)
12. Captain Beefheart/Dealing with Herbie/Linda Ronstadt (1:10)
13. Back to California 1968/The Mothers' Second European Tour/Royal Festival Hall (2:35)
14. Janis Joplin/Grace Slick/Jefferson Airplane (1:22)
15. Donuts in Austin 1973/New Mexico/Big Sunny and The Little Boys/Bandidos (1:40)
16. Albuquerque/Clearly Classical/The Blob Shaped LP (9:18)
17. Zappa Music Again/The Austin Grandmothers 1988/Settlement with Frank (3:12)
18. Eugene Chadbourne/Germany/Dreams on Longplay (2:48)
19. Meeting Moni/Not on Sunday, Not in Bavaria (2:05)
20. The Grandmothers 1998/Eating The Astoria/Leukemia (3:45)

== Personnel ==
- Jon Larsen – guitar
- Jimmy Carl Black – vocals, telephone
- Tommy Mars – keyboards
- Kirk Van Houten – keyboards
- Knut Reiersrud – harmonica, guitar
- Ola Kvernberg – violin
- Rob Waring – marimba
- Bill White – bass
- Ole Morten Vågan – double bass
- Andreas Bye - drums
- Håkon Mjåset Johansen – drums

== Credits ==
- Compositions by Jon Larsen
- Lyrics by Jon Larsen
