= Norwegian Arctic Philharmonic Orchestra =

The Norwegian Arctic Philharmonic (Norwegian: Arktisk Filharmoni) is an orchestral institution based in Tromsø and Bodø, Norway. Since its founding in 2009, as The Northern Norwegian Opera and Symphony Orchestra, it has become one of Northern Norway’s largest and most active cultural institutions, performing opera and concert productions in various formats each year.

The Arctic Philharmonic alternates between different ensemble formats on a regular basis, from small chamber groups via the Bodø-based sinfonietta and Tromsø-based chamber orchestra, to a full symphony orchestra that brings all the performers together. Christian Lindberg was the inaugural Principal Conductor of the orchestra, serving until 2018. In 2019, Christian Kluxen became Principal Conductor. Tim Weiss is the artistic director for stand-alone performances of the sinfonietta subset of strings and wind instruments, while Henning Kraggerud is the artistic director for stand-alone performances of the chamber orchestra subset of strings from the Arctic Philharmonic.

The Arctic Philharmonic collaborates with other musicians in the region and has cooperation agreements with the Norwegian Armed Forces’ Band North and Landsdelsmusikerne i Nord-Norge.

== Ownership, board and management ==
Built on the former Tromsø-based Tromsø Symphony Orchestra, Arctic Philharmonic was created as a new organisation, owned 50% each by Tromsø City Council and Bodø City Council. The county councils of Nordland, Troms and Finnmark are contributing partners through the Cultural Agreement for Northern Norway.

The Board of Directors comprises eight members and two substitutes. The Chair of the Board is Tor Arne Viksjø and the Deputy Chair is Nina Hjorth.

== Albums ==
The orchestral institution has made several recordings with BIS Records, Naxos and Simax. In addition to their own albums, they have collaborated on album productions with Philip Glass, Kari Bremnes, Jon Larsen, Terje Nilsen, Unni Wilhelmsen, Hekla Stålstrenga, Glød, Anneli Drecker, A-ha and Mannen som stoppet Hurtigruta.
