= Vertavo String Quartet =

Norwegian musical group

Vertavo String Quartet is a Norwegian group founded in Hamar in 1984. The four women forming the quartet are Øyvor Volle, Annabelle Meare, Berit Cardas, and Bjørg Lewis. They appeared on the album A Portrait of Jon Larsen.
