= Jimmy Rosenberg =

Dutch guitarist (born 1980)

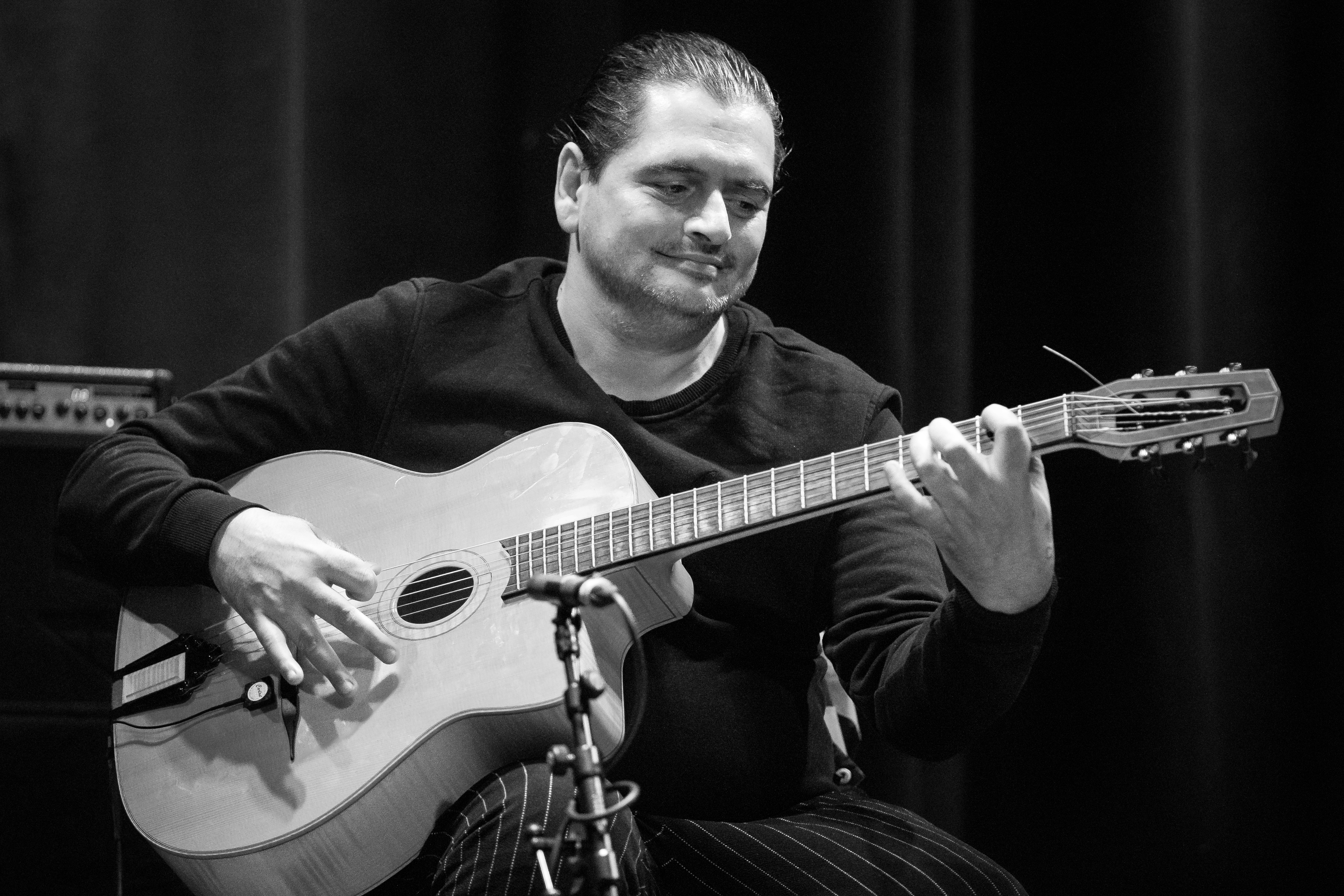
- Rosenberg in 2024

Background information
- Birth name: Joseph Rosenberg
- Born: 10 April 1980 (age 45); Helmond, Netherlands
- Genres: Gypsy jazz, jazz
- Occupation: Musician
- Instrument: Guitar
- Years active: 1989–Active
- Labels: Hot Club
- Website: jimmyrosenberg.nl

Joseph "Jimmy" Rosenberg (born 10 April 1980) is a Dutch Sinto-Romani guitarist known for his virtuoso playing of gypsy jazz.

== Music career ==
A cousin of Stochelo Rosenberg, Jimmy Rosenberg started playing guitar when he was seven years old. Two years later he led his own trio, the Gypsy Kids, which played in the Gypsy jazz tradition and appeared on the British documentary Django Legacy. The trio released its first album, Safari, when Rosenberg was twelve. A year later Rosenberg released his debut solo album, Swinging with Jimmy Rosenberg.

To avoid a lawsuit by the Gipsy Kings, the Gypsy Kids changed their name to Sinti in 1989. In 1995, the group consisted of Jimmy Rosenberg, Johnny Rosenberg, and Rinus Steinbach. They performed at the Django Reinhardt Festival in France and toured the U.S. Rosenberg pursued a solo career in 1997.

In 2000 he made his debut at Carnegie Hall as part of the Django Reinhardt Festival at Birdland in New York City. He has worked with Norwegians such as Hot Club de Norvège, Ola Kvernberg, and Stian Carstensen. Internationally, he has worked with Romane, Jon Larsen, Andreas Öberg, Bireli Lagrene, Angelo Debarre, Frank Vignola, and Willie Nelson.

His life is documented in the Dutch film The Father, the Son, and the Talent (Dutch: Jimmy Rosenberg - de vader, de zoon & het talent; 2007), directed by Jeroen Berkvens. The film is an account of Rosenberg's relationship with his father and his struggles with drugs. It documents the high regard given to him by James Brown, Stevie Wonder and others.

The documentary film Jon & Jimmy, about his long but turbulent relationship with jazz guitarist Jon Larsen, was released in 2010 and won the Dutch Edison Award.

Rosenberg returned to performing in 2007, but he dropped out again the following year. Jon Larsen said, "Jimmy Rosenberg is one of the greatest talents in the jazz guitar world, ever, and one of the greatest tragedies. ... We worked together for twelve fantastic years before his final collapses in 2004, and we were like brothers, touring for months on end and making nine studio recordings together. During those years I heard some of the most fantastic music ever played on guitar."

== Discography ==
- Sinti (Columbia, 1996)
- Jimmy, Bireli & Angelo (Hot Club, 1998)
- Jimmy Rosenberg Acoustic Guitar (Hot Club, 1998)
- Portrait of Jimmy Rosenberg (Hot Club, 1999)
- Hot Club de Suede (Hot Club, 2003)
- Django's Tiger (Hot Club, 2003)
- Trio (Hot Club, 2004)
- Rose Room with Stian Carstensen (Hot Club, 2005)
- The One and Only with Bireli Lagrene, Angelo Debarre (Hot Club, 2006)
- The Alternative with Bireli Lagrene, Angelo Debarre (Hot Club, 2013)

With Hot Club de Norvege

- Hot Club de Norvege Featuring Ola Kvernberg & Jimmy Rosenberg (Hot Club, 2000)
- Parisian Honeymoon Suite (Refined, 2001)
- Swinging with Vertavo, Angelo & Jimmy (Hot Club, 2001)

=== Video ===
- Jimmy Rosenberg: The Father, the Son, and the Talent (2006)
- Jimmy Rosenberg Is Back (2007)
- Jimmy Rosenberg at the Bimhuis (2008)
- Jon and Jimmy (2010)
