= Romane (musician) =

French jazz guitarist

Patrick Leguidecoq (known professionally as Romane; born 1959 in Paris, France) is a guitarist who specializes in gypsy jazz.

== Biography ==
Although not a gypsy by birth, Romane benefited from interactions with gypsy guitar players from an early age and especially learned from the recordings of Django Reinhardt, to whom he has remained a faithful heir through the course of his career. However, this respect does not hinder him in any way and does not prevent him from composing original pieces in the gypsy jazz genre.

His discography shows a desire not to remain rigidly fixed in the style but also to move forward, whether by the choice of musicians, accompanying instruments or the choice of whether or not to amplify his guitar. He has performed in a range of settings, from duo to sextet: for example, the group Django Vision or the Romane Acoustic Quartet. His partners on recordings range from Florin Niculescu to Didier Lockwood, Tchavolo Schmitt, Angelo Debarre and Stochelo Rosenberg.

Romane also works in the educational field, having published several methods of guitar, opened a school of gypsy swing music (the Swing Romane Academy), launched a magazine (French Guitare) and was the first director of the Village Musiques Actuelles ATLA founded by Noëlle Tatich in 1994.

His son, Richard Manetti, also pursues a career as a jazz guitarist and gypsy swing performer. They regularly perform together on national and international stages. His younger son, Pierre, is also a guitarist.

== Publications ==
- Romane is the founder of French Guitare magazine, the first issue of which was published in March 1997. The title became French Guitare et Chanson in 2000 and ceased publication in the same year.
- Gypsy Jazz with Derek Sebastian (method), Paul Beuscher - Arpèges
- La Pompe with Derek Sebastian (method)
- L’Esprit manouche with Derek Sebastian, Carisch France (method), 2001
- La Guitare jazz manouche, ed. CEO (method in DVD)

== Awards and honors ==
- 1997: Sidney Bechet Prize of the Academy of Jazz
- 2013: Grand Prix of the Jazz, Grand Prix Sacem

== Discography ==
=== As leader ===
- Swing for Ninine (Kardium, 1992)
- Romane Quintet (JSL, 1994)
- Gypsy Swing Romance (Koka Media, 1996)
- Ombre (Imp, 1996)
- New Quintet du Hot Club de France (Arco Iris 1998)
- Samois-Sur-Seine (Arco Iris, 1998)
- Impair & Valse (Iris Music, 1999)
- Elegance with Stochelo Rosenberg (Iris Music, 2000)
- Romane and the Frederic Manoukian Orchestra (Iris Music, 2001)
- Romane Acoustic Quartet (Iris Music, 2002)
- Djangovision (Iris Music, 2003)
- Double Jeu with Stochelo Rosenberg (Iris Music, 2004)
- Acoustic Spirit (Iris Music, 2004)
- French Guitar (Iris Music, 2005)
- Gypsy Guitar Masters with Stochelo Rosenberg (Iris Music, 2006)
- Pere and Fils (Iris Music, 2007)
- Tribulations with Stochelo Rosenberg (Universal/EmArcy, 2010)
- Roots & Groove: Live at the Sunset (Fremeaux, 2011)
- Guitar Family Connection (Fremeaux, 2013)

=== As sideman ===
- Vladimir Cosma, Le Diner de Cons (Pomme Music 1998)
- Didier Lockwood, For Stephane (Ames, 2008)
- Guy Marchand, Demain J'arrete (Capitol Music 2002)
- Tchavolo Schmitt, Alors? ... Voila! (Iris Music, 2000)
