= Tommy Mars =

American keyboard player (1951–2026)

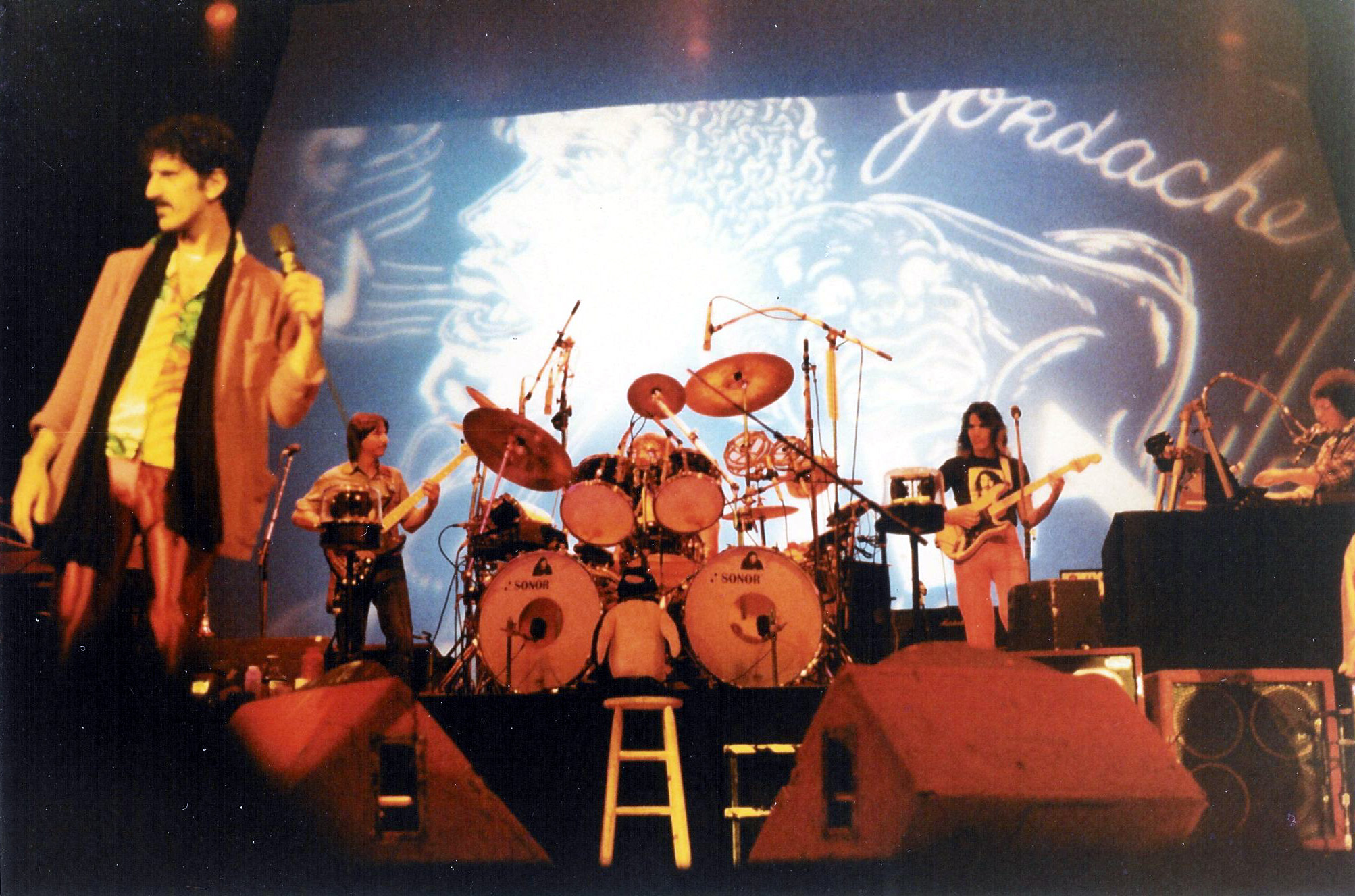
- Mars (far right), Frank Zappa and band during a concert at the Memorial Auditorium, Buffalo, NY. Oct 25, 1980

Background information
- Born: Thomas Mariano; October 26, 1951
- Died: November 19, 2026 (aged 75)
- Occupation: Musician
- Instrument: Keyboards
- Years active: 1977–2026

Thomas Mariano (October 26, 1951 – November 19, 2026), known professionally as Tommy Mars, was an American keyboard player known for his work with Frank Zappa.

== Life and career ==
Thomas Mariano was born on October 26, 1951. He began piano lessons at age eight, and later his instrument range expanded to various keyboards and synthesizers. Mars graduated in 1972 from the Hartt College of Music in West Hartford, Connecticut. From there he struggled to hold a variety of musical jobs including choirmaster, church organist, movie accompanist and more. In a 1980 interview in Keyboard magazine, Mars described one of the more unusual jobs he had as follows - "I was working in this revolving organ bar in Kodiak, Alaska, with Japanese and Russian fishermen kicking me in the back if I couldn't play an ethnic folk song to their drunken satisfaction".

Knowing nothing about Zappa except for the songs "King Kong" and "Peaches en Regalia", Mars was asked to audition for Zappa's band with the help of percussionist Ed Mann, also a member of Zappa's group. Zappa hired Mars based on Mars' synthesizer expertise. From 1977 to 1982 he was part of Zappa's touring band, appeared in the movie Baby Snakes, and recorded on a number of Zappa albums.

After his work with Zappa, Mars alternated between teaching and touring with Steve Vai or Stuart Hamm. In the mid-1990s, Mars formed (The) Banned From Utopia, a group consisting of 10 Zappa band alumni, performing Zappa's music as a tribute band.

In 2007 Strange News from Mars was presented, a jazz hybrid with Jon Larsen, on Zonic Entertainment, featuring Bruce Fowler, Jimmy Carl Black, Arthur Barrow, and other Zappa alumni. In 2008 Mars made a brief (three tracks) appearance on The Jimmy Carl Black Story, together with the original Mothers of Invention drummer Jimmy Carl Black.

Spring 2009 saw the release of the 2005 recorded No Forest Fire: Mars together with The Band From Utopia members Bruce Fowler, Walt Fowler, Kurt McGettrick, Larry Klimas, Arthur Barrow, and Vinnie Colaiuta.

In 2010 Mars recorded the surrealistic audio book Willie Nickerson's Egg, written by Jon Larsen, released in 2011. At Moldejazz 2014 Mars performed Willie Nickerson's Egg live (three sold-out concerts), together with Arthur Barrow, Arild Andersen, and Jon Larsen, etc.

Mars died on November 19, 2026, at the age of 75.
