= Angelo Debarre =

French Romani gypsy jazz guitarist

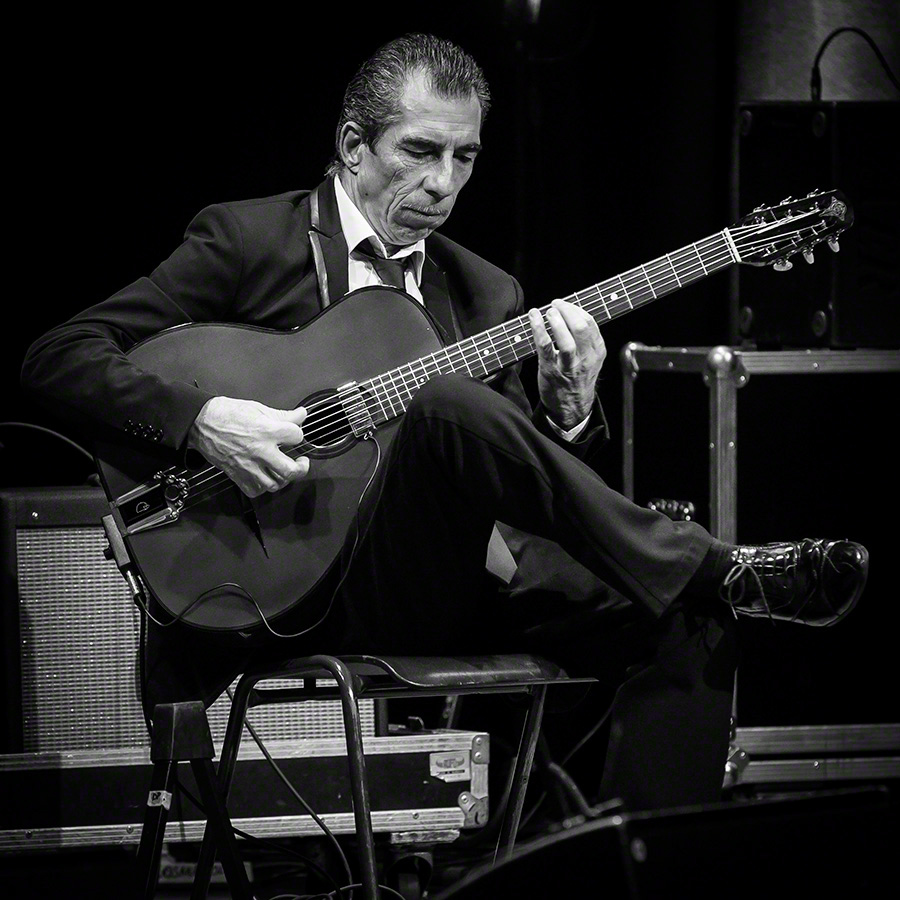
- Debarre at Cosmopolite, Oslo, Norway, 2016

Background information
- Born: August 19, 1962 (age 63); Saint-Denis, France
- Genres: Gypsy jazz
- Occupation: Musician
- Instrument: Guitar
- Years active: 1984–present
- Labels: Hot Club, Le Chant du Monde

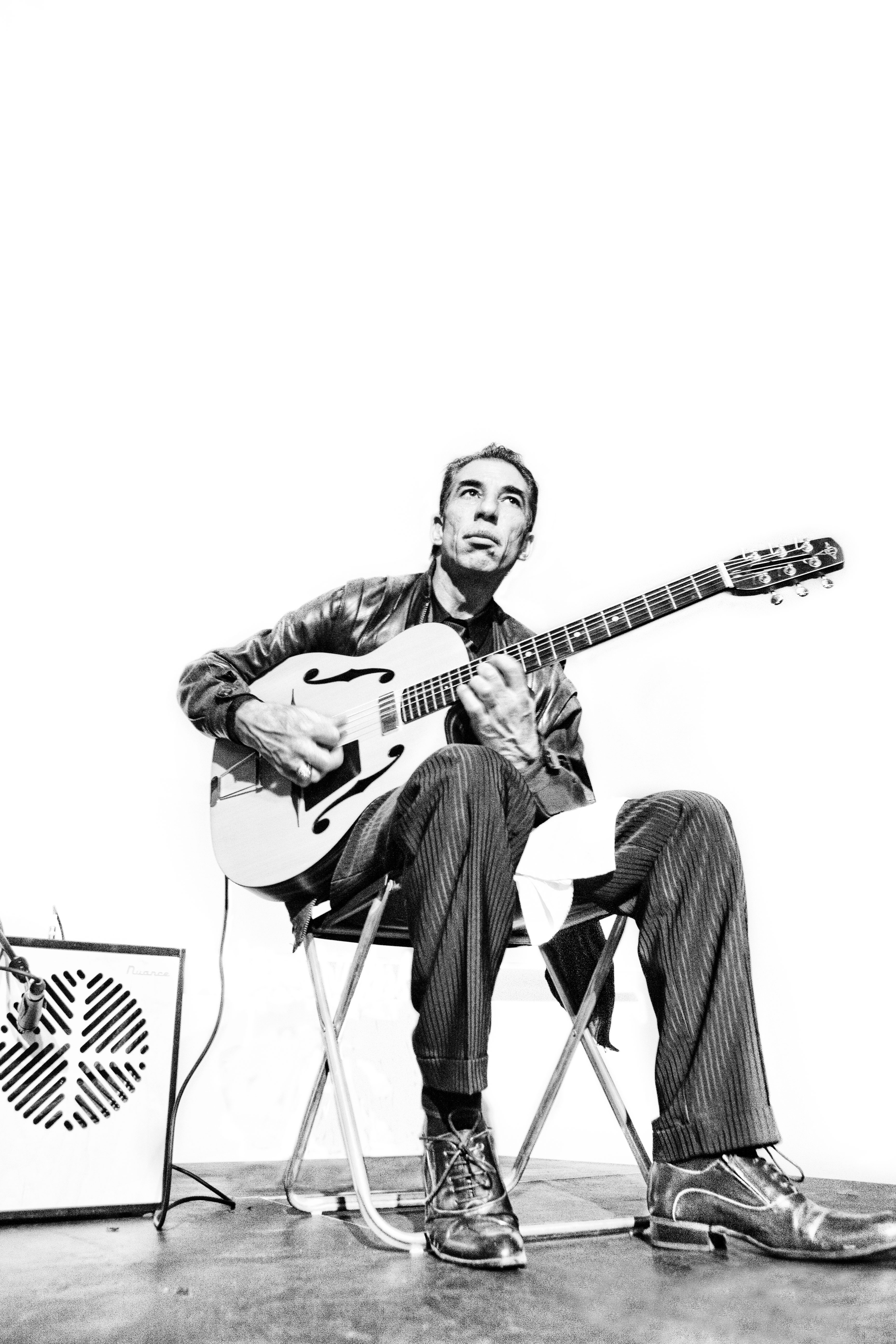
Angélo Debarre performing in Paris, April 2013

Angelo Debarre (French pronunciation: [ɑ̃ʒelo dəˈbaʁ]; born August 19, 1962) is a French Romani gypsy jazz guitarist.

== Biography ==
Debarre was born in Saint-Denis, Paris, and began playing at age eight. In 1984, he formed his first group, the Angelo Debarre Quintet. In 1985, the group was hired by Serge Camps to play at his Parisian café, La Roue Fleurie, where Debarre was discovered by producer and guitarist Jon Larsen.

Debarre has performed in several Romani and jazz festivals, including Birdland's annual Django Reinhardt Festival. He recorded Mémoires: Memories of Django with Tchavolo Schmitt.

== Discography ==
=== As leader ===
- Gypsy Guitars with Frank Anastasio, Serge Camps (Hot Club, 1989)
- Caprice (Hot Club, 1998)
- Romano Baschepen (Al Sur, 1998)
- Gipsy Swing of Paris with Florin Niculescu (Kosinus, 2001)
- Swing Rencontre with Ludovic Beier (Marianne Melodie, 2002)
- Come into My Swing with Ludovic Beier (Le Chant du Monde, 2003)
- Impromptu (Lejazzetal, 2004)
- Memoires with Tchavolo Schmitt (Le Chant du Monde, 2004)
- Live at Djangofest Northwest with Tim Kliphuis (Gypsy Jazz 2005)
- Entre Amis with Ludovic Beier (Le Chant du Monde, 2005)
- Entre Ciel et Terre with Ludovic Beier (Le Chant du Monde, 2006)
- Live at Le Quecumbar London (Lejazzetal, 2007)
- Paroles De Swing with Ludovic Beier (Le Chant du Monde, 2007)
- Trio Tout a Cordes (Le Chant du Monde, 2008)
- Gipsy Unity (Le Chant du Monde, 2009)
- Live in Paris (Le Chant du Monde, 2011)
- Complicité with Marius Apostol (Just Looking, 2013)

=== As sideman ===
- Bratsch, Rien Dans Les Poches (Network Medien, 1998)
- Thomas Dutronc, Eternels Jusqu'a Demain (Mercury/Universal 2015)
- Hot Club de Norvège, La Roue Fleurie (Hot Club, 1992)
- Hot Club de Norvège, Swinging with Vertavo, Angelo & Jimmy (Hot Club, 2001)
- Romane, Samois-Sur-SeineArco (Iris, 1998)
- Jimmy Rosenberg, Jimmy, Bireli & Angelo (Hot Club, 1998)
