= Jon Larsen (Norwegian musician) =

Norwegian musician, composer, and painter

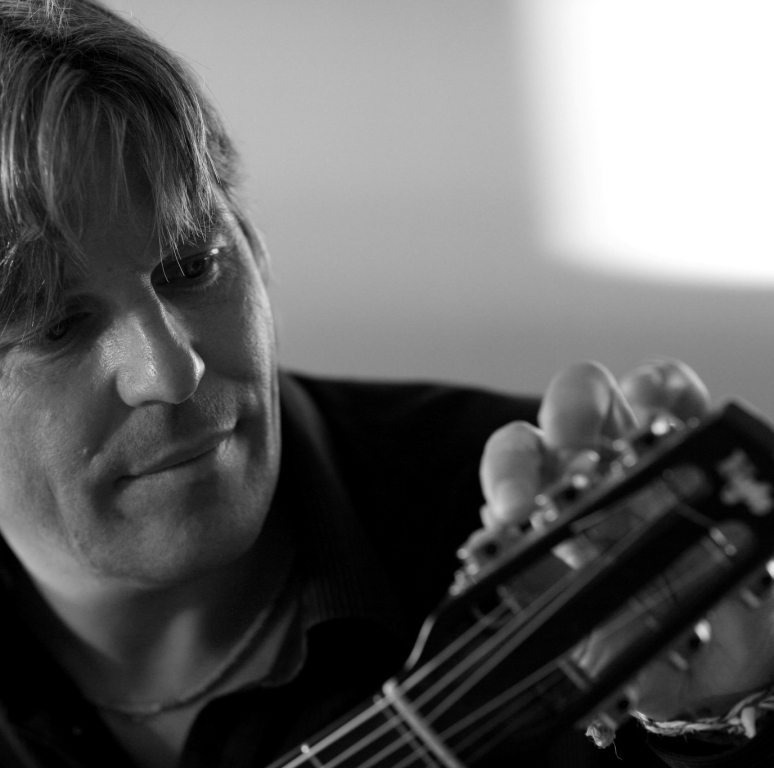
- Jon Larsen, 2008

Background information
- Born: 7 January 1959 (age 67); Bærum, Norway
- Genres: Jazz, gypsy jazz
- Occupations: Musician, composer, painter, scientific researcher
- Instrument: Guitar
- Years active: 1976–present
- Label: Hot Club
- Website: www.hotclub.no/jonlarsen/index.html

Jon Larsen (born 7 January 1959) is a gypsy jazz guitarist, record producer, painter, and amateur scientific researcher. He is the founder of the group Hot Club de Norvège. In 2007 he received the Buddy Award for his lifelong contribution to jazz.

== Career ==
When he was in his early teens, he learned rock and soul songs on an acoustic steel-string guitar. Through friends, he learned about blues, jazz, flamenco, and classical guitar. After he heard "Tears" by Django Reinhardt on the radio, he decided that this is how he wanted his guitar to sound. At seventeen he formed a string trio and had his first professional job.

In the 1970s, Larsen worked mainly as a painter. He started the Hot Club de Norvege in 1980 with guitarists Per Frydenlund and bassist Svein Aarbostad. They had a hit record when they performed with pop singer Lillebjørn Nilsen. Larsen started the label Zonic Entertainment to record musicians who have been influenced by Frank Zappa. He has worked with Chet Baker, Philip Catherine, Stéphane Grappelli, Warne Marsh, Biréli Lagrène, Babik Reinhardt and Jimmy Rosenberg. He has produced more than 450 jazz records for the label he founded, Hot Club Records.

He has led a group of musicians who played with Zappa, including Arthur Barrow, Jimmy Carl Black, Bruce Fowler, Bunk Gardner, Tommy Mars, and Don Preston. They recorded the album Strange News from Mars.

Symphonic Django was released in 2008 by Storm Films, which also produced a documentary about Larsen and guitar virtuoso Jimmy Rosenberg titled Jon & Jimmy. In 2012, the documentary won the Dutch Edison Award.

After eight years of research, his book on cosmic dust in urban environments – In Search of Stardust: Amazing Micro-Meteorites and Their Terrestrial Imposters – was published in 2017.

In 2020, he appeared in Werner Herzog's documentary film Fireball: Visitors from Darker Worlds where he demonstrated the methods of sampling micro-meteorites from urban environments.

== Discography ==
=== As leader ===
- Guitar Sax Guitar & Bass (Hot Club, 1985)
- Superstrings (Hot Club, 1992)
- Jon Larsen & Pascal De Loutchek (Hot Club, 1994)
- Guitaresque with Pascal De Loutchek, Stian Mevik (Hot Club, 1994)
- The Swinging Guitar of Jon Larsen (Hot Club, 1995)
- The Next Step (Hot Club, 2003)
- Vertavo Live in Concert (Hot Club, 2006)
- Short Stories from Catalonia (Hot Club, 2006)
- Strange News from Mars (Zonic, 2007)
- The Jimmy Carl Black Story (Zonic, 2008)
- Willie Nickersons Egg (Hot Club, 2009)
- No Man's Land (Hot Club, 2024)

With Hot Club de Norvege

- String Swing (Herman, 1981)
- Old, New, Borrowed & Blue (Hot Club, 1982)
- Gloomy (Hot Club, 1984)
- Swing de Paris (Hot Club, 1986)
- La Roue Fleurie (Hot Club, 1992)
- Vertavo (Hot Club, 1995)
- Moreno (Hot Club, 1999)
- Swinging with Vertavo, Angelo & Jimmy (Hot Club, 2001)
- White Night Stories (Hot Club, 2002)
- A Stranger in Town (Hot Club, 2003)
- Django Music (Hot Club, 2008)
- A Portrait of Jon Larsen (2009)

=== As sideman ===
- Lillebjorn Nilsen, Original Nilsen (Studio B, 1982)
- Lillebjorn Nilsen, Hilsen Nilsen (Grappa, 1985)
- Ole Paus, Pausposten Extra! (Norsk 1996)
- Jimmy Rosenberg, Django's Tiger (Hot Club, 2003)

== Books ==
- Maler I Solnedgang (Painter in the Sunset) – 2009
- Norske Meteoritter – 2014
- Zappa I Norge – 2015
- In Search of Stardust – 2016 (translated to Japanese, Chinese, Norwegian)
- Robert Normann - Tusenkunstneren fra Sundløkka – 2016
- Star Hunter – 2017
- Hot Club de Norvège 1979-2019 – 2019
- On the Trail of Stardust – 2019
- Atlas of Micrometeorites – 2020
- How To Find Stardust – 2021
- A Life In Pictures – 2023

== Film ==
- Symphonic Django – Storm Studio – 2007
- Jon & Jimmy – Storm Studio – 2010, Winner of the Dutch Edison Award 2010
- Fireball – Werner Herzog – 2020

Awards
Preceded by Paal Nilssen-Love	Recipient of the Buddyprisen; 2007	Succeeded by Frode Gjerstad
