= Gilles Tordjman =

French musicologist, journalist and literary critic

Gilles Tordjman (born 31 August 1962 in Paris) is a French musicologist, journalist and literary critic.

== Biography ==
After graduating with a master's degree in philosophy in 1984, he wrote for Le Matin de Paris and L'Express before joining Les Inrockuptibles in 1992 where he was an editorial writer for five years.

In April 1997, Gilles Tordjman left Les Inrockuptibles following a polemic in the editorial office about Michel Bounan's book, L'Art de Céline et son temps which he had defended. He then joined L'Événement du jeudi. Subsequently, Gilles Tordjman also wrote in Technikart, Jazzman, Jazz Magazine, Épok, Elle, Playboy, Vibrations, Mouvement, and on artnet.fr.

Gilles Tordjman wrote books devoted to Duke Ellington and Leonard Cohen as well as numerous articles about jazz musicians, notably Django Reinhardt, Chet Baker, Eric Dolphy and Pascal Comelade.

He is also a literary critic, particularly interested in Emmanuel Bove, Henri Calet, Marius Jacob, Jacques Yonnet, Guy Debord and also Fernando Pessoa, Sun Tzu and Baltasar Gracián to whom Gilles Tordjman devoted long articles or postfaces when their works were reissued.

In 2012, he published an article against Bob Dylan in the special issue of Télérama devoted to the American singer.

== Quote ==
The truth changes according to the use that an epoch makes of it. This period no longer needs a lie as a mode of government, as it no longer needs censorship as a mode of control: it is by showing everything that it perpetuates its secrets, and it is by encouraging to say everything that it ensures the mastery of every word.

== Bibliography ==
- 2006: Leonard Cohen, Le Castor astral ISBN 978-2-85920-671-0
- 1998: C'est déjà tout de suite, preface by Éric Holder, Céra-nrs éditions ISBN 2-9510395-1-4 (collection of chronics published in les Inrockuptibles.)
- 1994: Duke Ellington, in collaboration with François Billard, Éditions du Seuil, ISBN 978-2020137003

=== Prefaces, postfaces ===
- 2006: Philippe Robert, Rock, pop, éd. Le Mot et le reste
- 1997: Baltasar Gracián, L'Homme de cour, Éditions Mille et Une Nuits.
- 1996: Fernando Pessoa, Ultimatum, Mille et une nuits
- 1996: Sun Tzu, The Art of War, Mille et une nuits
- 1995: Jonathan Swift, A Modest Proposal, Mille et une nuits

=== Translations ===
- 2014: Tarquin Hall, Les Aventures d'un bébé journaliste, translated from English, Globe
- 2013: Steven Levy, L'Éthique des hackers, translated from English, Globe
- 2000: Norman Cohn, Cosmos, chaos et le monde qui vient, translated from English, Éditions Allia
- 1990: Stan Motjuwadi and David Bristow, Soweto, preface by Johnny Clegg, translated from English, Éditions Tallandier
