= Arnaud Merlin =

- Born: 1963 (age 62–63); Tours, France
- Education: Conservatoire de Paris, Paris-Sorbonne University
- Occupations: Music journalist, radio producer, jazz critic

Arnaud Merlin (born 1963) is a French jazz critic, music journalist and radio producer who has worked mainly for France Musique in recent years.

== Career ==
Arnaud Merlin studied music at the Paris-Sorbonne University and Conservatoire de Paris, where he was awarded the History of Music and Aesthetics Prizes. He works as a music journalist since 1985, mainly for magazines like Jazz Hot, Jazzman and Le Monde de la musique.

From 1992 to 2004, he was a member of the Académie Charles-Cros and Académie du Jazz, editorial secretary of Cité Musiques (the newspaper of Cité de la Musique), . Since 1996, he has been producing music programmes on jazz and contemporary music for France Musique and Radio France. In 2002 he was a juror at the Concours internationaux de la Ville de Paris for the Concours de piano jazz Martial Solal. He was a member of the Artistic Committee of the Anglo-French Fund for Contemporary Music “Diaphonique” and the Commission Jazz & Blues. In 2012, he was awarded the Irmaward in the Jazz category of the Centre d’information et de ressources pour les musiques actuelles. Merlin is also the director of Musique Française d'Aujourd'hui and Orchestre National de Jazz and president of the Centre régional du Jazz in Burgundy.

With Franck Bergerot, he co-authored a two-volume miniseries about jazz music entitled L’épopée du jazz (lit. “The Epic of Jazz”), which are two heavily illustrated pocket books published in the collection “Découvertes Gallimard” in 1991. The second volume L’épopée du jazz 2/ Au-delà du bop has been translated into English, Italian, Russian and Korean.

== Publications ==
- With Franck Bergerot, Du blues au bop : L’épopée du jazz – Volume I, collection « Découvertes Gallimard » (nº 114), série Arts. Éditions Gallimard, 1991
- With Franck Bergerot, L’épopée du jazz 2/ Au-delà du bop, collection « Découvertes Gallimard » (nº 115), série Arts. Éditions Gallimard, 1991
  - The Story of Jazz: Bop and Beyond, ‘New Horizons’ series, Thames & Hudson, 1993 (UK edition)
  - The Story of Jazz: Bop and Beyond, “Abrams Discoveries” series. Harry N. Abrams, 1993 (U.S. edition)
