= Jazz Hot =

French jazz magazine

Jazz Hot La revue internationale du jazz depuis 1935 (the international journal of jazz since 1935)
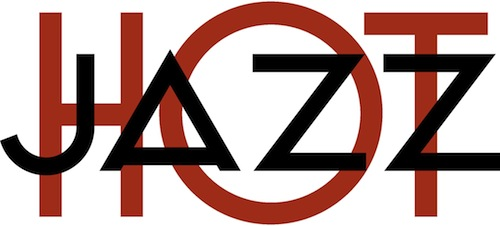

- Jazz Hot cover, Winter 2011, Issue 658; Billy Harper on the cover At the top: logo designed in 1935
- Editor-in-chief: Yves Sportis
- Frequency: Quarterly
- Format: Print; Digital; Mobile device
- Publisher: Jazz Hot Publications; Charles Delaunay (1947–1980)
- Founder: Hugues Panassié; Charles Delaunay
- Founded: March 1, 1935 – 1st series October 1, 1945 – 2nd series
- First issue: March 1, 1935
- Company: Jazz Hot Publications
- Country: France
- Based in: Marseille
- Language: French
- Website: www.jazzhot.net
- ISSN: 0021-5643

Jazz Hot is a French quarterly jazz magazine published in Marseille. It was founded in March 1935 in Paris.

== Early years ==
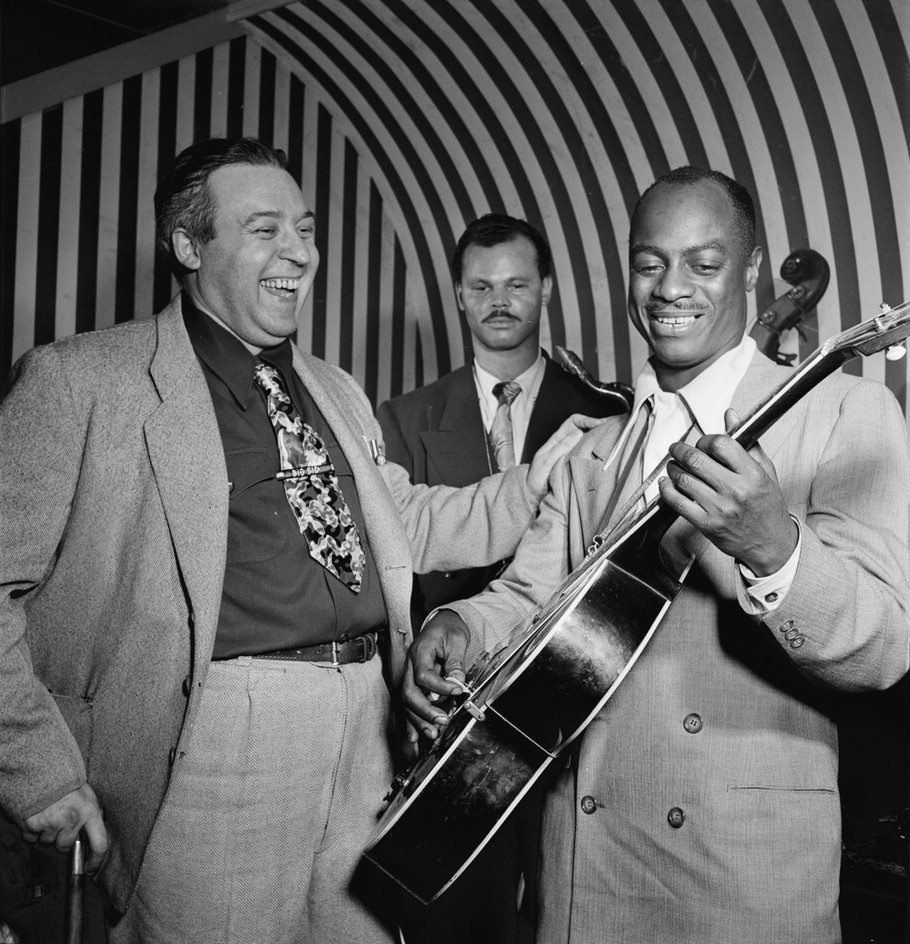
Hugues Panassié, Red Prysock, and Tiny Grimes, New York, New York, between 1946 and 1948 (William P. Gottlieb photo)

Jazz Hot is acclaimed for having innovated scholarly jazz criticism before and after World War II –jazz criticism that was also distinguished with literary merit, and in some articles before 1968, with leftist political views. Several of its early contributors are credited for helping to intellectualize jazz journalism and to draw attention to it from fine arts establishments and institutions. (Note: According to Scott DeVeaux, the "jazz as high art" movement did not reach its zenith until the 1950s, when a scholarly and journalistic effort was made to classify bebop as a legitimate art form, placing bebop at the peak of a stylistic evolution. ("Caught Between Jazz and Pop: The Contested Origins, Criticism, Performance Practice, and Reception of Smooth Jazz," doctorate dissertation, by Aaron J. West, PhD, University of North Texas, 2008; OCLC 464575154)) Jazz Hot has played an integral role integrating jazz into a French national identity.

From inception of the First and Second Series, until November 2007, Jazz Hot was published monthly but irregularly, typically combining months in the summers and sometimes the winters. Beginning with Issue No. 649, Fall 2009, Jazz Hot, has been published quarterly, regularly. The pre-World War II series — March 1935, Issue No. 1 to July–August 1939, Issue No. 32 — is referred to as the "First Series" or the "Original Series" or the "Pre-War Series." The First Series was bilingual, in French and selectively in English. The postwar series, beginning with Issue No. 1 in October 1945, was referred to as the "Second Series" or the "New Series" or the "Post-World War II Series." The Second Series was and still is in French only.

== World's oldest jazz publication ==
Although the American jazz magazine DownBeat was founded four months before Jazz Hot, it was not exclusively a jazz magazine at the time. Therefore, Jazz Hot is the oldest jazz magazine in the world, but the distinction has two caveats. Oldest does not mean longest running; publication of Jazz Hot was interrupted during World War II, giving way to jazz magazines that have been published without interruption. The issue sequence of the pre-war series, from March 1935 to July–August 1939, numbers 1 through 32, is independent from the issue sequence of the post-war series, which begins October 1945 with issue 1, which clouds the connection between the two series.

Jazz Hot was published in March 1935 in Paris on one page in the back of a program for a Coleman Hawkins concert at the Salle Pleyel on February 21, 1935. At its inception, Jazz Hot was the official magazine of the Hot Club of France, an organization founded in January 1934 by Panassié as president and Pierre Nourry as secretary general. (Note: Pierre Nourry was called up by the French Navy and later moved to Algeria in the mid-1930s. When the Club Hot Club of France was re-established in 1938, Delaunay assumed his role as Secretary General. (Dregni)) In August 1938, the club was dissolved and reestablished with Panassié as president and Charles Delaunay as secretary general. The club was primarily interested in Dixieland recordings, revival of Dixieland — which had lost popularity due to the swing craze of the 1930s — record listening sessions, and camaraderie among like-mined enthusiasts. Panassié and Delaunay were the founders of the Jazz Hot.

Before World War II, Jazz Hot was instrumental in the club's efforts to curate, restore, and import live and recorded Dixieland. The magazine endured under the auspices of the Hot Club of France for 45 issues — the entire 32 issues before World War II and first 13 consecutive issues after World War II — until February 1947, when it became privately owned and headed by Delaunay.

Jazz Hot suspended publication — the last being July–August 1939, Issue No. 32 — for 6 years, 1 month. Panassié spent the war years at his chateau in the unoccupied zone of Southern France and Delaunay, using the Hot Club as cover, gathered intelligence that was transmitted to England. He also traveled around France, organizing concerts, and giving lectures on music — all sanctioned by the Propaganda-Staffel. Unable to publish Jazz Hot, Delaunay issued clandestine, one-page publications. Following the Decree of July 17, 1941, Delaunay began issuing a clandestine, one-page duplex sheet, Circulaire du Hot Club de France from September 1941 to June 1945 that was inserted in the programs of Hot Club concerts. The Hot Club of France resumed publishing Bulletin du Hot Club de France in December 1945 as Issue No. 1.

== Dispute over the definition of jazz ==
Panassié, editor-in-chief since the founding of Jazz Hot before the war, was adamant his entire life that "authentic jazz" was strictly Dixieland of the 1920s and Chicago-style jazz –or hot jazz similar to the style of Louis Armstrong and others. Panassié further insisted that "real jazz" was the music of African Americans and that non-African Americans could only aspire to be imitators or exploiters of African Americans.

In music, primitive man generally has greater talent than civilized man. An excess of culture atrophies inspiration.

For music is, above all, the cry of the heart, the natural, spontaneous song expressing what man feels within himself.

— Hugues Panassié

When Panassié heard a bebop recording of "Salt Peanuts" in 1945, he refused to accept it as jazz and frequently admonished its artists and proponents. He harbored the same objections to cool and other progressive jazz. His refusal to accept new genres of jazz as "real jazz" lasted his entire life.

Panassié argued that real jazz was innately inspired. He praised so-called black rhythm over white harmony and innate black jazz talent over white jazz mastery. As one musician put it, "If a black man knows some [stuff], that's talent. If a white guy knows the same [stuff], he's smart. For Panassié, Gillespie's and Parker's foray into bebop, despite the fact that they were African Americans, represented a betrayal to African American jazz musicians and a departure from jazz itself because bebop required learned musicianship, which, according to Panassié, contaminated jazz because it was white music.

Panassié also argued that jazz was an art that should not be contaminated by commercialism. He was one of the most hostile critics of swing, which emerged in the 1930s.

From June 22, 1940, to November 11, 1944, Germany occupied Northern France, Panassié spent that time safely at his family's château in Gironde in the unoccupied zone of Southern France, isolated from developments in jazz. Bebop began to develop in Harlem late 1939. The outrage by Panassié began when Delaunay, in 1945, sent him a 1944 Musicraft bebop recording of Dizzy Gillespie's "Salt Peanuts", a 1943 composition by Gillespie and Kenny Clarke.

Panassié's views ceased to reflect the views of Jazz Hot when he left the magazine in 1946. But because he was a co-founder of Jazz Hot and because he set a standard for covering jazz as editor-in-chief of Jazz Hot, he is closely identified with Jazz Hot, even today..

Delaunay, who spent World War II years in Paris, had been following developments in progressive jazz, namely bebop and cool jazz. Delaunay also saw economic potential given that jazz in post-war France was big. Delaunay had been speaking of tolerance for modern jazz and "old white traditionalist" such as Eddie Condon and Jack Teagarden.

Jazz is more than just Dixieland or just re-bop...It's both of them and more.

— Charles Delaunay, August 1946

Panassié, who through November 1946, had been editor-in-chief of Jazz Hot and President of the Hot Club of France, was furious over Delaunay's views in support for new jazz and threw him out as Secretary General of the Hot Club. Panassié declared a schism in the Association of Hot Clubs movement. A few regional clubs sided with Panassié but the Hot Club in Paris sided with Delaunay.

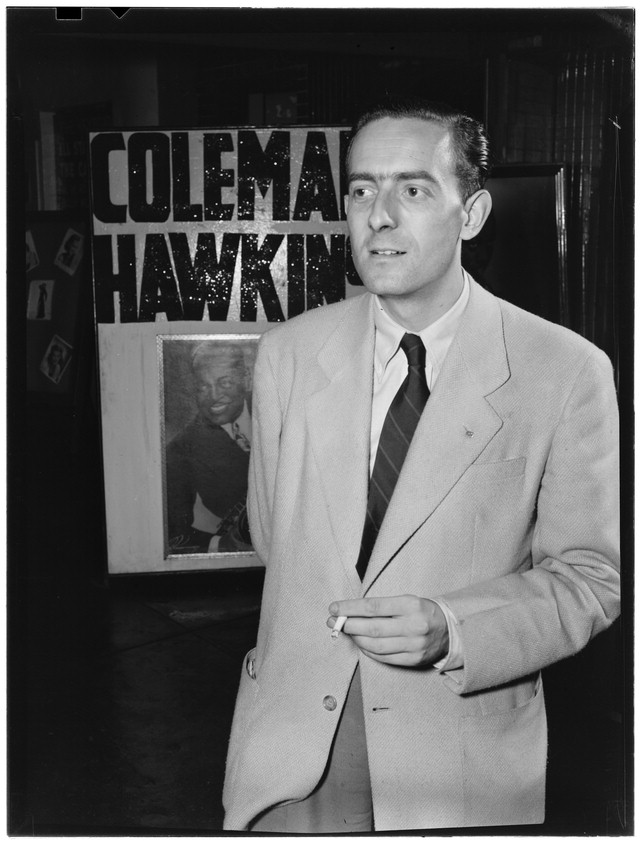
Charles Delaunay on 52nd Street, Manhattan, October 1946 (William P. Gottlieb photo)

In November 1946, Delaunay, André Hodeir, and Frank Ténot formally declared Jazz Hot's independence from Hot Club. In December 1946 (Issue No. 11), the cover featured a full-page photo of Dizzy Gillespie and the erstwhile words on the cover, "Revue du Hot Club de France," disappeared. Henceforth, Delaunay was the publisher, Hodeir, editor-in-chief, Ténot, editorial secretary, and Jacques Souplet (fr), director. Jazz Hot's registered office was 14, rue Chaptal (fr), Paris 9e (Note: Cover: "Jack Diéval" (fr), Jazz Hot, Vol. 17, Second Series, November 1947) Delaunay remained as the financial backer for 34 years, until 1980.

Jazz scholar Andy Fry wrote that the dispute was less about traditional jazz versus modern than it was about closed and open notions of jazz tradition, and it involved a "healthy slice of professional jealousy." Jazz Scholar Matthew F. Jordan wrote that the split had begun not over whether jazz was a threat to true French culture, but over authority over the definition of jazz and commercial control of what had become a popular and marketable form of mass culture.

Nonetheless, privatizing Jazz Hot and establishing a new openness to evolving jazz redefined the publication as a comprehensive jazz magazine — expanding its coverage in multiple countries and cities, rather than maintaining the erstwhile fan club publication of a revivalist niche style of jazz, for which a prime locus—a hotbed for a latent genre—was France.

In December 1946, Panassié resigned as editor-in-chief of Jazz Hot, claiming that "our correspondent in the United States, Franck Bauer (fr), was used to compare Bunk Johnson to Louis Armstrong!" Jazz Hot—beginning with December 1946 issue, Vol. 12, No. 11— removed Panassié's name as director from the masthead.

== Bebop and cool ==
Beginning December 1946 (Issue No. 11), Jazz Hot began to add coverage of evolving jazz, which at the time consisted of so-called progressive jazz — bebop from New York, cool from Los Angeles, gypsy from France. Notable contributors included Lucien Malson (fr) (born 1926) and André Hodeir (1921–2011). Other influential magazines, notably Down Beat of Chicago, had been publishing articles that extoled bebop as serious music since 1940. Down Beat had risen through the 1940s on the tide of big band swing, which declined in the late 1940s. Bebop, however, continued to develop and spread globally into a jazz mainstay but has never been big in a commercial sense.

Roscoe Seldon Suddarth, once an American diplomat, wrote a masters thesis, "French Stewardship of Jazz: The Case of France Musique and France Culture." In it, he stated that the French never developed a strong taste for white swing bands such as Glenn Miller, Tommy Dorsey, and Benny Goodman. He and other historians attribute this to the fact that the French were cut off from American music during the war. And also, the French developed a preference — strongly expressed by Panassié, Delaunay, and Vian — for African American musicians. Brubeck, popular in America, never caught on in France. His use of formal music training in jazz offended Hodier and Delaunay. According to Suddarth, Vian was so offended by it that he refused to distribute Brubeck's recordings, and for similar reasons he refused to distribute Stan Kenton's.

Jazz, a magazine published by the Hot Club of Belgium, ran from March to November 1945, Issues 1 through 13. After a one-month hiatus, it resumed in January 1946 under the name Hot Club Magazine: revue illustrée de la musique de jazz and ran to August 1948, Issues 1 through 29. Carlos de Radzitzky (fr) (1915–1985) was editor-in-chief of Hot Club Magazine. Beginning November 1948, the publication was absorbed and appeared as a two-page insert in Jazz Hot from November 1948 to October 1956. The Hot Club of Belgium was founded April 1, 1939, by Willy De Cort, Albert Bettonville (1916–2000), Carlos de Radzitzky, and others. The club disbanded in the mid-1960s.

In October 1947, Boris Vian, a Sartre protégé, contributed an article to Combat, a leftist daily underground newspaper established in 1943, mocking Panassié In 1947, Delaunay co-edited some essays called "Jazz 47" that were published in a special edition of the French publication, America. The article appeared under the auspices of the Hot Club of Paris but apparently without getting approval from the club. It included essays by Sartre, Robert Goffin, and Panassié, but Panassié was not invited to be an editor.

Jazz Hot greeted the arrival of free jazz scene in New York and the European free jazz movement with much fanfare, devoting considerable space to the movement beginning in 1965 and throughout the peak of free jazz from about 1968 to 1972. Critics included Yves Buin (fr) (born 1938), Michel Le Bris (fr) (born 1944), Guy Kopelowicz, Bruno Vincent, and Philippe Constantin (fr) (1944–1996).

Beginning with Issue No. 647, November 2008, Jazz Hot went online.

== Related publications ==
Panassié started La Revue Du Jazz (fr): "Organe Officiel Du Hot Club De France," in January 1949 (Issue Issue No. 1) (OCLC 173877110, 4979636, 19880297). He was editor-in-chief. Bulletin Du Hot Club De France was started January 1948 (ISSN 0755-7272, ISSN 1144-987X). As of February 2026, the publication has endured 78 years as the official magazine of the Hot Club of France.

== Selected contributors ==
=== French language ===
- Boris Vian (1920–1959), a protégé of Jean-Paul Sartre, and a novelist, poet, playwright, songwriter, jazz trumpeter, screenwriter, and actor, made his first contribution to Revue du Hot Club de France March 1946, Issue No. 5. A 1994 New York Times article stated that, "like many old-time French fans, Vian thought a white person could not play jazz, except for French white persons." Outside of Jazz Hot, Vian published works under twenty-seven pseudonyms, and translated a great deal of American fiction, including works by Richard Wright, Raymond Chandler, and Ray Bradbury.
- Marcel Zanini (born 1923)
- Frank Ténot (1925–2004), one of the critics who, in 1946 with Vian, began to question Panassié's nostalgic definition of jazz
- Lucien Malson (born 1926)
- Carlos de Radzitzky (1915–1985), a Belgian music critic
- Pierre Nourry, one of the original contributors in 1936. In 1934, Panassié and Nourry, both co-founders of the Hot Club of France became President and Secretary General, respectively, of the club; Nourry, an impresario, is credited for inviting, in 1934, Django Reinhardt and Stéphane Grappelli to form the Quintette du Hot Club de France with Reinhardt's brother Joseph Reinhardt and Roger Chaput on guitar, and Louis Vola on bass, when all of them were virtually unknown.
- Jacques Bureau (SOE) (1912–2008) was one of the original contributors in 1936 and was also a co-founder of the Hot Club of France.
- Franck Bergerot, journalist with Jazz Hot, 1979 to 1980 and 1984 to 1989
- Arnaud Merlin (born 1963) was a journalist at Jazz Hot beginning in the mid to late 1980s
- Albert Bettonville (1916–2000), co-founder of the Hot Club of Belgium, was, with Radzitzky, the most important Belgian jazz critic
- Lucien Malson (born 1926) wrote for Jazz Hot from 1946 to 1956
- Jacques Demêtre (né Dimitri Wyschnegradsky; born 1924 Paris), Frenchified his name to Dimitri Vicheney but wrote under the pseudonym Jacques Demêtre (his father was composer Ivan Wyschnegradsky). He is one of the earliest musicologists in the world to analyze Chicago blues artists. Some historians credit him as the discoverer of post-war Chicago blues. His articles on Chicago blues spanned from the 1960s to the 1970s. He left Jazz Hot in the 1970s and later contributed to Soul Bag
- Jean-Christophe Averty (born 1928), who works primarily in radio and TV, wrote some articles for Jazz Hot, notable two about Sidney Bechet in May 1960 and May 1969
- Laurent Goddet was a prolific contributor, notable articles include one 1976, "Free Blues: Don Pullen;" (Note: "Free Blues: Don Pullen" (translated by Mike Bond), Jazz Hot, Issue N° 331, October 1976) His father was Jacques Goddet, sports journalist and director of Tour de France from 1936 to 1986
- Jacques D. LaCava, PhD, researched Chicago blues and wrote and produced the 1986 French documentary film, Sweet Home Chicago

=== English language ===
- Stanley Dance (1910–1999), who had been profoundly influenced by Panassié, wrote an article on Teddy Wilson in the first issue of Jazz Hot in March 1935; in 1946, he married Helen Oakley, Jazz Hot's correspondent in the U.S.; from 1948 until his death in 1999, he wrote for the Jazz Journal; in the 1950s he coined the term mainstream to describe those in between revivalist and modern, or alternatively between Dixieland and bebop
- John Hammond (1910-1987)
- George Frazier (1911–1974)
- Walter Schaap (né Walter Eliott Schaap; 1917–2005) became a committed follower of jazz while an undergraduate at Columbia University; in 1937, he studied at Sorbonne; while there, he collaborated with Panassié and Delaunay; his son, Phil Schaap (1951–2021), was a jazz host on WKCR in New York City. Swiss conductor Ernest Ansermet, the first classical music professional to take jazz seriously, wrote a seminal article in 1919, "Sur un Orchestre de Négre," in the October 1, 1919, issue of La Revue Romande. Nineteen years later, Jazz Hot published it in French and English; Schaap translated it to English. (Note: "Sur un Orchestre Négre," by Ernest Ansermet, translated by Schaap, Jazz Hot, Vol. 4, Issue N° 28, November–December 1938, pps. 4–8)
- Leonard Feather (1914–1994)
- Preston Jackson (1902–1983) wrote a regular column for Jazz Hot in the 1930s
- Ira Gitler (1928–2019)

== Editors in chief ==
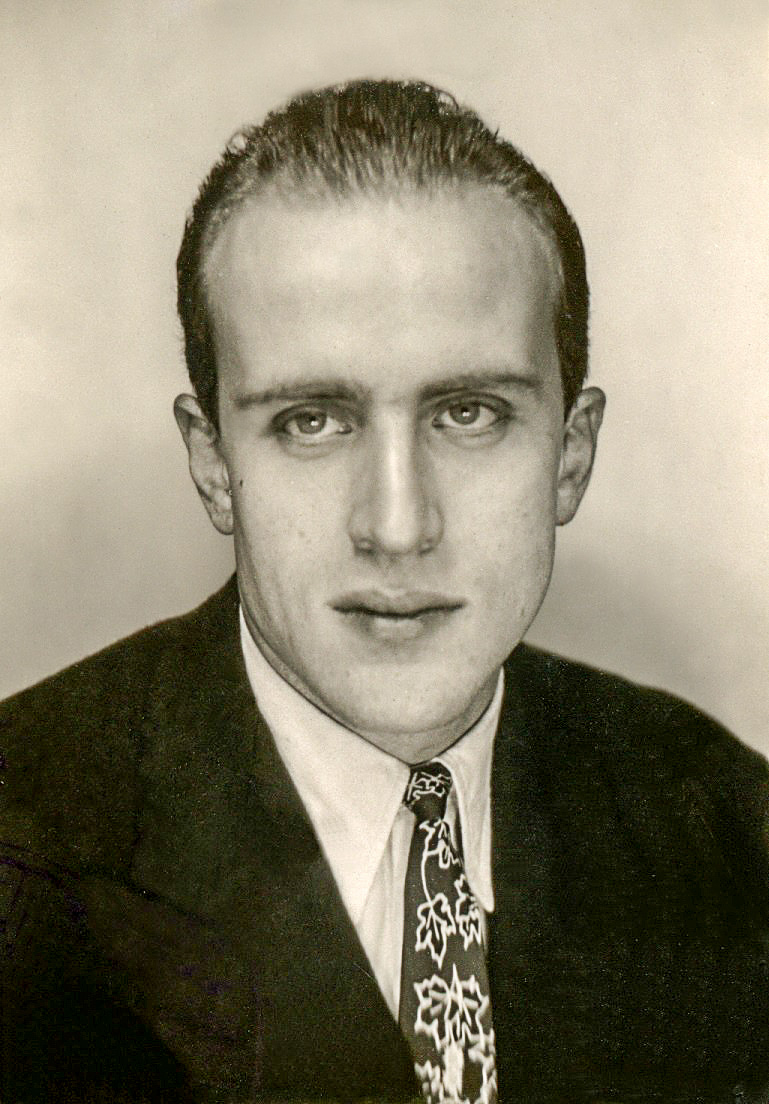
Boris Vian (date unknown)

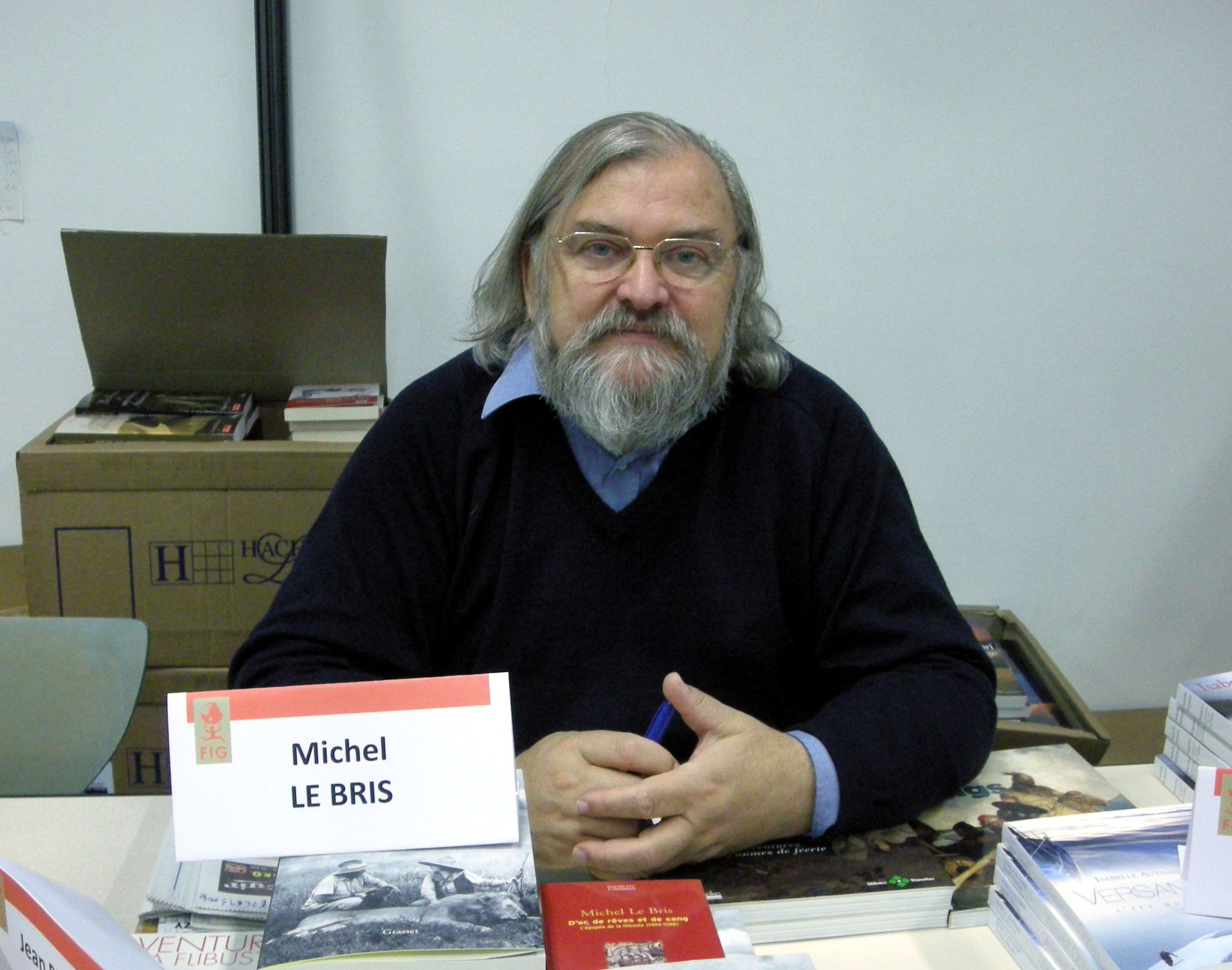
Michel Le Bris (2008)

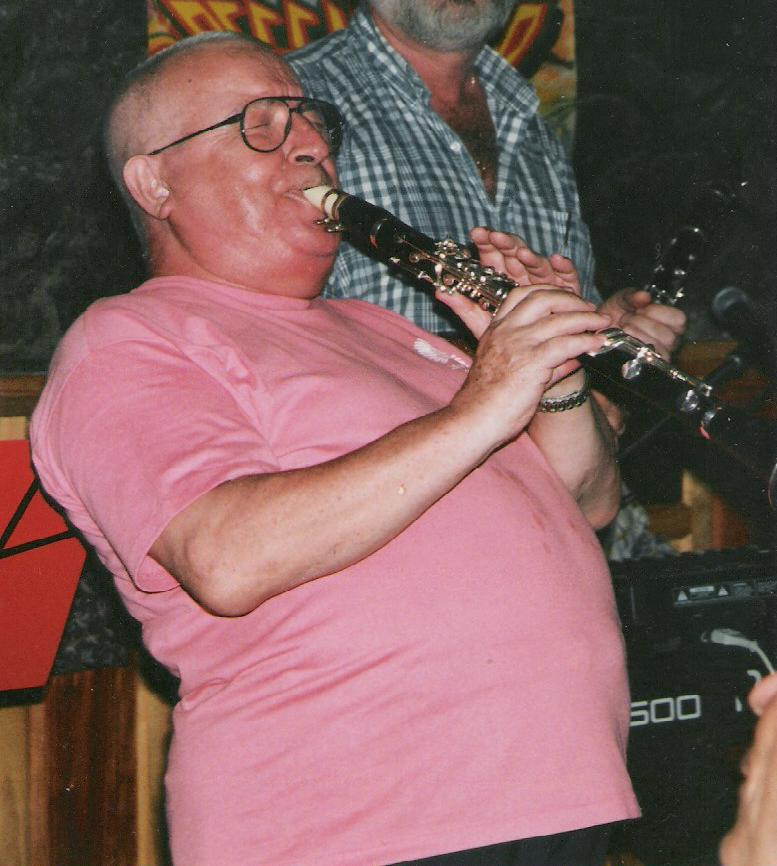
Maxim Saury (1996)

- Hugues Panassié: 1935–1939 & 1945–1946
  - Panassié sought to define "true jazz" for France as being strictly Dixieland. To that end, he ridiculed some of the leading jazz musicians of his time. Panassié also ardently expressed the view that jazz played by whites was artificial jazz, though he lauded a few whites for their ability to replicate "true jazz." When he wrote of white jazz musicians, he often pointed out that they were white. As a result, he was sometimes criticized for stoking a reverse discrimination. Panassié resigned under pressure as editor-in-chief, but he had a following and continued to lead the anti-bebop wing of the French establishment. (Note: "Préjugés" (translated by Jean-Jacques Finsterwald), Jazz Hot, Issue N° 45, June 1950, pg. 11)
- André Hodeir: 1947–1951
  - Hodeir was an early French proponent of bebop. DownBeat called Hodeir's first compilation of jazz writings, written in the early 1950s, Jazz: Its Evolution and Essence, "the best analytical book on jazz ever written."
- fr:Jacques Souplet (fr):195?–1954
  - Souplet left the magazine in 1954 to work for Barclay Records. He founded Jazz Magazine to make sure Barclay's new releases would be reviewed — Jazz Hot had been ignoring many of them.
- Philippe Koechlin (fr): 1965–1968
  - Koechlin started as a columnist for Hot Jazz in 1958. As editor, Koechlin published of 30,000 copies of a special issue of Jazz Hot in the summer of 1966, titled "Rock & Folk," which featured a photo of Bob Dylan on the cover and contained articles about the Rolling Stones, Antoine, Chuck Berry, Nino Ferrer, and Eddy Mitchell. In the 1960s, it became difficult for Jazz Hot to keep up with the developments in New York. (Note: "Courrier" (Letters to the Editor), by Alain Lejeune, Jazz Hot, Issue N° 207, March 1965, pps. 15–16)
- Michel Le Bris (fr): 1968-1969
  - Le Bris had been a protégé of Delaunay. His authority had been sharply curtailed late 1968 by Delaunay, who became alarmed that the magazine had become too political. Le Bris was, at the time, a member of Gauche prolétarienne and was sympathetic to protests. Le Bris was fired in December 1969, but went on to become editor of Gauche prolétarienne's publication, La Cause du Peuple (fr).
- Yves Sportis: 1982??–19??
  - Sportis moved the head office from Paris to Marseille.
- Jean-Claude Cintas: 1988–1990

== Extant copies and archival access ==
Greenwood Press

- Greenwood Press

Worldcat

Fédération internationale des hot clubs.; Hot Club de France.

- ISSN 0021-5643
- OCLC 6542520, 771213112, 243423718, OCLC 474348184
- OCLC 858501229 Greenwood Press

Jazz Hot/Editions de L'Instant

- OCLC 35260815

Jazz-Diffusion

- OCLC 715124017

Unnamed publisher

- OCLC 742648550, 803863494

L'Annuaire du jazz; supplément de la revue Jazz-hot

- OCLC 31041885 (discography)

Library of Congress

- LCCN 63-65

National Library of France

- FRBNF 12118676

== Earlier jazz magazines ==
- La Revue du Jazz (fr) was first published in Paris July 1929, Issue No. 1, by an Armenian eccentric dancer and impresario, Grégor (né Krikor Kelekian; 1898–1971), who, beginning 1928, also led a jazz orchestra with Stéphane Grappelli at the piano. It was the first French magazine to focus exclusively on jazz, but also served to promote his Grégor's big band. The magazine lasted for less than a year, ending March 1930, Issue No. 9. Panassié contributed two articles to this series.
- Review Négre (fr) was founded in 1925 in Paris, partly to promote the success in France of performances by Josephine Baker. The magazine is often cited as the first French jazz magazine, though its focus was not exclusively on jazz.
- Jazz-Tango was founded in Paris October 1930, Issue No. 1, and ran monthly until 1938. The magazine was published monthly and targeted professional musicians in dance bands that played jazz and Argentine tango. The magazine published the official news for the Hot Club of France until Panassié and Delaunay founded Jazz Hot in 1936. For a few publications, beginning around 1933, Jazz-Tango was renamed Jazz-Tango Dancing. In 1936, Jazz-Tango merged with L'orchestre L'orchestre, Jazz-Tango beginning with the May–June 1936 issue, No. 67. The editor of Jazz-Tango asked Panassié to become a columnist. The publication was a monthly and targeted professional musicians in dance bands. When approximately three-thousand Parisian musicians were out of work, a riff developed over Panassié declarations that true was to be performed by black musicians. Stéphane (Marcel) Mougin (1909–1945), a pianist with the Gregor Orchestra and musicians' union organizer, contributed articles that ran counter to Panassié, in support of French musicians. Mougin was editor of La Revue du Jazz and Jazz-Tango. Notable contributors included Jacques Canetti, who had a job writing for Melody Maker. Léon Fiot, a musician, was one of the editors of Jazz-Tango.
- Der Jazzwereld, a Dutch publication, was founded by Ben Bakema (artist name Red. R. Dubroy), who published the first issue in August 1931.
- Down Beat was founded in Chicago in June 1934.
- Síncopa y Ritmo, an Argentine publication, was founded in Buenos Aires in August 1934.
- Gramophone which, as a general music magazine, included some jazz writing by critic Edgar Jackson
- Melody Maker was founded in 1926, which, at the time, mostly targeted dance band musicians
