= Eric Holder (disambiguation) =

Eric Holder (born 1951) was United States attorney general from 2009 to 2015.

Eric Holder may also refer to:

- Éric Holder (1960–2019), French novelist
- Eric Holder, British art dealer and co-founder of Abbott and Holder, art dealer
- Eric Holder, convicted of the murder of Nipsey Hussle
