= Jim Hall (musician) =

American jazz guitarist, composer (1930–2013)

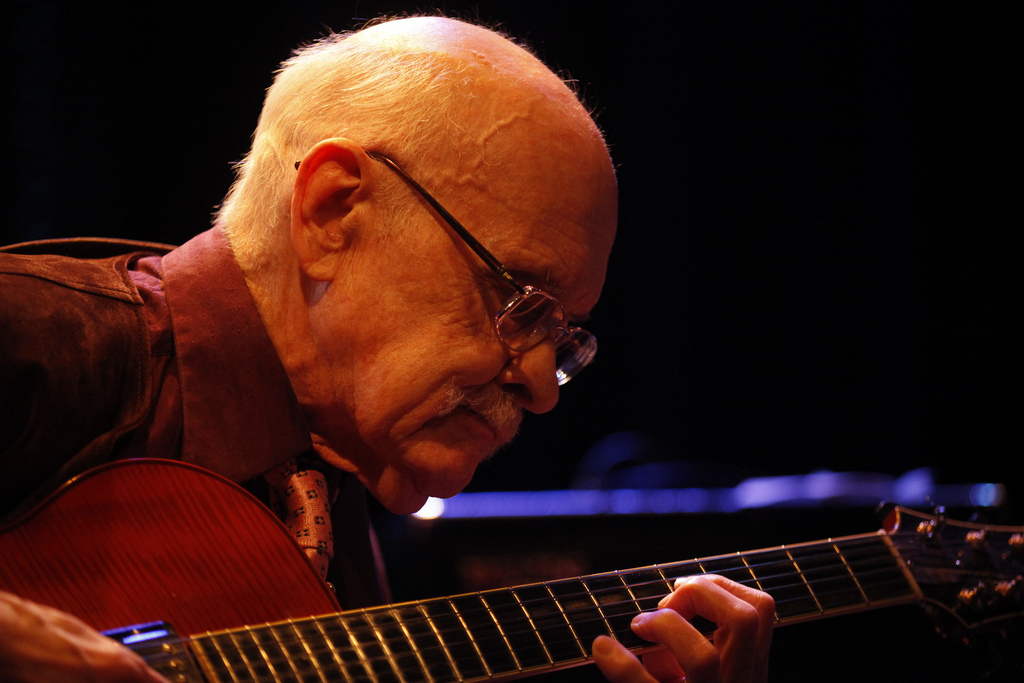
- Hall in 2010

Background information
- Born: James Stanley Hall; December 4, 1930; Buffalo, New York, U.S.
- Origin: Cleveland, Ohio
- Died: December 10, 2013 (aged 83) New York City, U.S.
- Genres: Jazz, cool jazz, post-bop
- Occupations: Musician, composer, arranger
- Instrument: Guitar
- Years active: 1955–2013
- Labels: CTI, Concord, Telarc, ArtistShare, Pacific Jazz
- Website: www.jimhallmusic.com www.jimhalljazz.com

James Stanley Hall (December 4, 1930 – December 10, 2013) was an American jazz guitarist, composer and arranger.

== Biography ==
=== Early life and education ===
Born in Buffalo, New York, Hall moved with his family to Cleveland, Ohio, during his childhood. Hall's mother played the piano, his grandfather played violin, and his uncle played guitar. He began playing the guitar at the age of 10, when his mother gave him an instrument as a Christmas present. At 13, he heard Charlie Christian play on a Benny Goodman record, which he calls his "spiritual awakening". As a teenager in Cleveland, he performed professionally, and also took up the double bass. Hall's major influences since childhood were tenor saxophonists Coleman Hawkins, Lester Young, Paul Gonsalves, and Lucky Thompson. While he copied out solos by Charlie Christian, and later Barney Kessel, it was horn players from whom he took the lead. In 1955, Hall attended the Cleveland Institute of Music, where he majored in composition, studying piano and bass in addition to theory.

=== Early professional career ===
In 1956, Hall moved to Los Angeles, where he studied classical guitar with Vicente Gómez. In 1955 and 1956, Hall played in Chico Hamilton's quintet, a group associated with the cool jazz movement, and Hall's playing began to gain attention from critics and fellow musicians.

Hall left Hamilton's group to join another cool jazz ensemble, the Jimmy Giuffre Three, and he worked on and off with Giuffre from 1957 to 1960. Hall recorded his first solo album, Jazz Guitar, for Pacific Jazz in 1957, though the album made only a modest impact, and Hall did not get to record a follow-up until 1969.

During the late 1950s and early 1960s, Hall developed a preference for "challenging arrangements and interactive improvisation in duos and trios". He taught at the Lenox School of Jazz in Massachusetts in the summer of 1959. Hall toured during the late 1950s with Jazz at the Philharmonic and worked around this time in Los Angeles with Ben Webster, appearing on Ben Webster at the Renaissance (recorded in 1960). During 1959, he recorded the first of six albums as a featured soloist with Paul Desmond. In 1960, Hall also toured and recorded with Ella Fitzgerald in Europe.

Hall moved to New York City around 1960 and began performing with band leaders including Lee Konitz (1960–61), Sonny Rollins (1961–62, 1964), and Art Farmer (1962–64). He formed a studio partnership with Bill Evans during this time, appearing on five albums with Evans from 1962 to 1966. Hall also worked as a studio guitarist for commercial recording dates during the early and mid-1960s. As a freelance studio musician, he appeared on albums by singers Big Joe Turner, Johnny Hartman, June Christy, Big Miller, and Freda Payne, as well as on commercially oriented orchestral pop and jazz albums by Quincy Jones, Lalo Schifrin, Oliver Nelson, and Gary McFarland. His freelance jazz work in the 1960s covered a range of styles. He participated in cool jazz, bossa nova, and third stream albums led by John Lewis, Gerry Mulligan, Bob Brookmeyer, and Paul Desmond. Hall recorded bebop and hard bop sessions with Sonny Stitt, Nat Adderley, and Sonny Rollins. He recorded a soul jazz session with Hammond organist Paul Bryant.

In 1962, he led a trio with pianist Tommy Flanagan and bassist Ron Carter (who was replaced by Red Mitchell in 1965). Starting in 1963, Hall played in the studio orchestra for The Merv Griffin Show, working with Bill Berry, Bob Brookmeyer, Benny Powell, Art Davis and Jake Hanna.

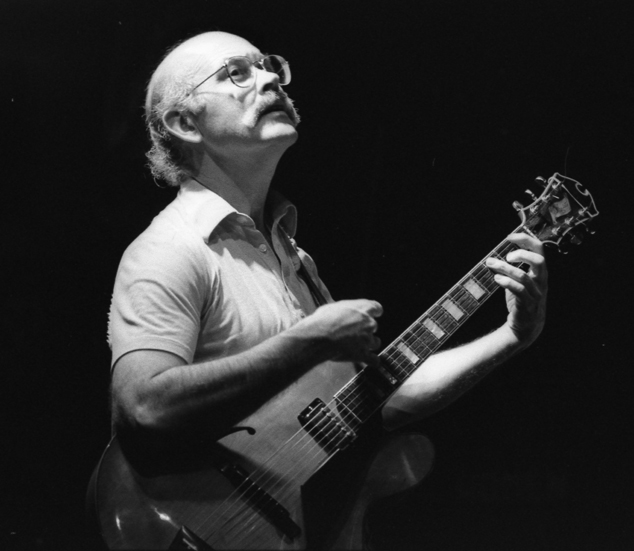
Hall at Keystone Korner, San Francisco, October 29, 1980.

In the late 1960s, Hall decided to leave his television job and pursue a solo career more actively. He recorded and performed in Germany and Japan, appearing on the Berlin Festival Guitar Workshop LP (1968) alongside Barney Kessel and Baden Powell, and on the Guitar Genius In Japan LP (1970) alongside Kenny Burrell and Attila Zoller. The German MPS label recorded Hall's second solo album, It's Nice to Be With You in 1969. In 1971, he began recording for Milestone Records, whose co-founder Orrin Keepnews had produced several records with Hall when running his previous label, Riverside Records. While on Milestone, Hall recorded the first of three duet albums with Ron Carter. Moving to CTI Records, Hall made the 1975 Concierto album, which featured Paul Desmond and Chet Baker, and became a critical and financial success.

Hall was an arranger and composer, as much as a performer. He was known for developing motifs and using blues inflections. These characteristics are showcased in his 1975 album Jim Hall Live!, with Don Thompson and Terry Clarke. During the late 1970s and early 1980s, Hall recorded with pianist George Shearing, classical violinist Itzhak Perlman, and had a studio reunion with Art Farmer. He also continued recording in duos with Red Mitchell and Ron Carter until 1985.

=== Later life and career ===
Hall recorded steadily from the 1970s until 2010, releasing albums on the Horizon, Concord, MusicMasters, and Telarc record labels.

Hall continued to tour all over the world during these years. His band members included drummers Bill Stewart, Joey Baron and Andy Watson, bass players Scott Colley and Steve LaSpina, and keyboardists Gil Goldstein and Larry Goldings. At times, saxophonists Chris Potter and Greg Osby played in Hall’s groups as well. Some of these musicians are featured in Hall's video Master Sessions with Jim Hall from 1993. Hall appeared as a guest soloist in Michel Petrucciani's trio with Wayne Shorter in 1986 and performed at the Village Vanguard with Bill Frisell. In 1990, he hosted the JVC Jazz Festival New York, which also featured fellow guitarists Pat Metheny and John Scofield. After this, he played a number of duo concerts with Metheny. In 1994, Hall recorded a solo guitar album. Furthermore, in 1996, he returned to Europe to lead a quartet with saxophonist Joe Lovano.

In 1995, Hall was awarded an Honorary Doctorate of Music from Berklee College of Music. In 1997, Hall received the New York Jazz Critics Award for Best Jazz Composer/Arranger. His pieces for string, brass, and vocal ensembles can be heard on his Textures and By Arrangement albums. His original composition, "Quartet Plus Four", a piece for jazz quartet and string quartet featuring the Zapolski string quartet, was debuted in Denmark, where he was awarded the Jazzpar Prize.

His last orchestral composition was a concerto for guitar and orchestra, commissioned by Towson University in Maryland for The First World Guitar Congress, which debuted in June 2004 with the Baltimore Symphony. He was awarded an NEA Jazz Masters Fellowship award in January 2004. Hall was one of the first artists to join the fan-funded label ArtistShare and released Magic Meeting in 2005. In 2006, on behalf of the French Minister of Culture, Kareen Rispal, Cultural Counselor of the Embassy of France, bestowed Hall with the honor of Chevalier dans l'ordre des Arts et des Lettres, saying, in part, "We honor you, Jim Hall, for expanding the musical universe, for your innovations and contributions to musical expression. We salute your ongoing experimentation which has been known countless times to bring people around the world together." In November 2008, the double album Hemispheres was released through ArtistShare, featuring fellow guitarist and former student Bill Frisell with Scott Colley (bass), Joey Baron (drums) and produced by Brian Camelio.

Hall performed in a project titled “The Live Project”, where he shared his music making process through ArtistShare as well as interviews with other musicians about his lasting influence. In 2010, Hall and Baron recorded a duo album entitled Conversations. In 2012 at the age of 81, Hall had gigs at the Blue Note in New York City and at a number of jazz festivals in the US as well as in Europe.

=== Personal life ===
Hall married Jane Hall (née Jane Herbert) on September 9, 1965. Jane, a psychoanalyst by profession, was also an occasional composer and singer. Hall recorded several of her compositions, including "O Gato", "It's Nice to Be with You", "Where Would I Be?", "Goodbye, My Love", "The Answer Is Yes", and "Something Tells Me".

Hall died in his sleep of heart failure in his Manhattan, New York apartment on December 10, 2013.

== Musical style ==
"With each new concert tour and recording Jim reveals yet another facet of himself."

"Hall's musical style develops with every new album and collaboration he engages in. His approach to music is unique – he views music as a way to break all barriers, not limited to music, as well as to share his discoveries with others." "Music is a vehicle of peace for Hall and he therefore makes it a goal to reach out to others and communicate his music, teaching seminars all over the world. He is innovative and always interested in new modes of musical expression to further his ability."

Hall insisted a lot on the aural aspect of improvising music, stating that "Players should force themselves to hear something and then play it, rather than just do whatever comes under their fingers. I try to make my playing as fresh as possible by not relying on set patterns."

Hall's tone has been described as mellow, warm, gentle, subtle, rich, and lightly amplified. Unlike other musicians, Hall's work is not necessarily recognized by a signature riff but rather his expressive capabilities. As an arranger, his solos are aptly constructed, taking into account harmonic, melodic and rhythmic elements. They are composed with both feeling and technique with clarity as the ultimate goal.

Hall was a part of several groups that had unusual instrumentation in the context of jazz. In his first high-profile professional group, led by Chico Hamilton, Hall played alongside cellist Fred Katz in a group that did not feature a piano. Hall's next group, the Jimmy Giuffre 3, was even more radical, having no drummer or piano, and in one incarnation, no bass player. Hall later played on two André Previn records with classical violinist Itzhak Perlman. Similar to Duke Ellington, the other artists on the record influence the composition and he creates music to showcase their talents as well. Furthermore, he is always open to what is new and what others are playing, including the guitar synthesizer.

I'm not sure I have what's called a style, but I have an approach to music, an attitude to consciously allow myself to grow. I don't like to be boxed in or labeled as having to do with any certain period of jazz music or music in general.

Silence is as much a part of Hall's music as is sound. Intimate settings, such as smaller clubs, showcase this strength. Hall "carefully [chooses] a few notes instead, one after another, and placed them with the care of someone setting an elegant table." Although Hall is generally a leader, his excellent listening skills allow him to aid other musicians harmonically when required and staying silent when needed. Everyone is equal in Hall's groups, he explains, "each one of these guys is a creative, growing musician, and I treat them that way."

Exemplifying how Hall's musical style and approach could clash with more pre-planned approaches is his collaboration with guitarist Pat Metheny (1999). The duo had met 30 years previously, when guitarist Attila Zoller brought 15-year-old Metheny to The Guitar, a club where Hall and bassist Carter had a standing position. Hall described the collaboration in a 2011 interview recorded for the Smithsonian Institution:

I had lot of difficulty with Pat. We did a record together.....I think it could have been more unusual. (laughs) Pat is… I admire him in a lot of ways. He’s very inventive and he’s got a lot of technique and everything. But we… I kind of insisted… Well, our whole approach, I assume to life and other things, is, is quite different because Pat likes to do something in a studio and then take it home and mess with it and fix it, take all the mistakes out of it and all....So Pat wanted to blah, blah, blah, and do this and that so… And I was really against that because it just takes all the spontaneity out, I think. He likes to take things home and then fix them up—recording, I mean. So finally I sent him this, this fax. I said, I said, “Pat, what you’re describing sounds more like embalming than recording to me.” (laughs) So finally, we got together for lunch and we talked, and we agreed that we’d do part of it in the studio and then part of it down at the Manchester Craftsmen’s Guild. But listening to the CD, I know that he tampered with it, ‘cause it’s just all the…there’s just no, nothing to catch your attention. Nice playing but it’s just, it’s just all slick and all the life is taken out of it, you know. And I even insisted on doing some “free pieces,” ‘cause I figured that would loosen everything up. But even those, you can, you can hear they’re, they’re iced over. (laughs) I kind of resent that, in a way. That’s why I didn’t even have one of those records. I got about a zillion of ‘em and I left them out in the country or something.

"Jim is father of modern jazz guitar to me, he's the guy who invented a conception that has allowed guitar to function in a lot of musical situations that just weren't thought of as a possibility prior to his emergence as a player. He reinvented what the guitar could be as a jazz instrument... Jim transcends the instrument... the meaning behind the notes is what speaks to people." - Pat Metheny

Reflecting Hall's broad musical tendencies, the album contains originals by Hall, Metheny, mutual friends Steve Swallow and Zoller, and two standards. Hall and Metheny's expertise and virtuosity allowed for much improvisation, usually spurred by mood, which led to different compositions,"at times acoustic, soft, reverential, melodic, cacophonous, outlandish, humorous, and upbeat." Apart from Metheny, he influenced other then contemporary guitarists such as Bill Frisell, Mick Goodrick, John Scofield, and John Abercrombie.

== Awards and honors ==
For many years, Hall was named "Best Jazz Guitarist" by both the Critics and the Readers in annual Downbeat magazine polls. His lengthy career has garnered him many honors from around the world, including:

- Danish Jazzpar Prize (1998), an award of international, cultural significance sometimes referred to as The Oscar or The Nobel Prize of Jazz.
- National Endowment for the Arts Jazz Master Fellowship (2004)
- Choc de l'année Award (Jazzman – France) 2005 – Magic Meeting
- Choc de l'année Award (Jazzman – France) 2006 – Free Association
- Chevalier dans l’Ordre des Arts et des Lettres (Knight in the Order of Arts and Letters) granted by the French Minister of Culture and Communication (January 2006).
- Downbeat Hall of Fame (2014) (Downbeat) 2014

== Equipment ==
Hall always used an extremely simple approach regarding his instruments. In the very beginning of his tenure with Chico Hamilton, he used a Gibson Les Paul Custom. He soon switched to the hollow-body electric Gibson ES-175 guitar. This guitar, which Hall used for many years with its original P-90 pickup, was used with a Gibson GA50 amplifier. By the early 1970s, Hall was using a Guild-brand humbucker pickup in his guitar. In the mid-to-late 1970s, luthier Jimmy D'Aquisto supplied Hall with a pair of archtop guitars, one of which was all-acoustic, and the other of which had an electric pickup, and Hall began to use these instruments professionally. Also in the 1970s, Hall started using solid-state amplifiers, including those made by Polytone, Walter Woods, and Roland. Hall started working with luthier Roger Sadowsky in 1982, initially using Sadowsky for repair and maintenance work. Eventually the two collaborated on Sadowsky's Jim Hall Model guitar, a commercially available guitar based on Hall's original D'Aquisto.

Hall used flatwound strings gauges 11, 15, 20 (unwound), 30, 40, 50 (from high E to low E) and picks of varying thickness whose usage depended on what part he was playing. He would usually use medium picks for playing melodies, a thin pick if he would play a calypso, or "some kind of zany rhythmic thing" and heavy picks for ballads.

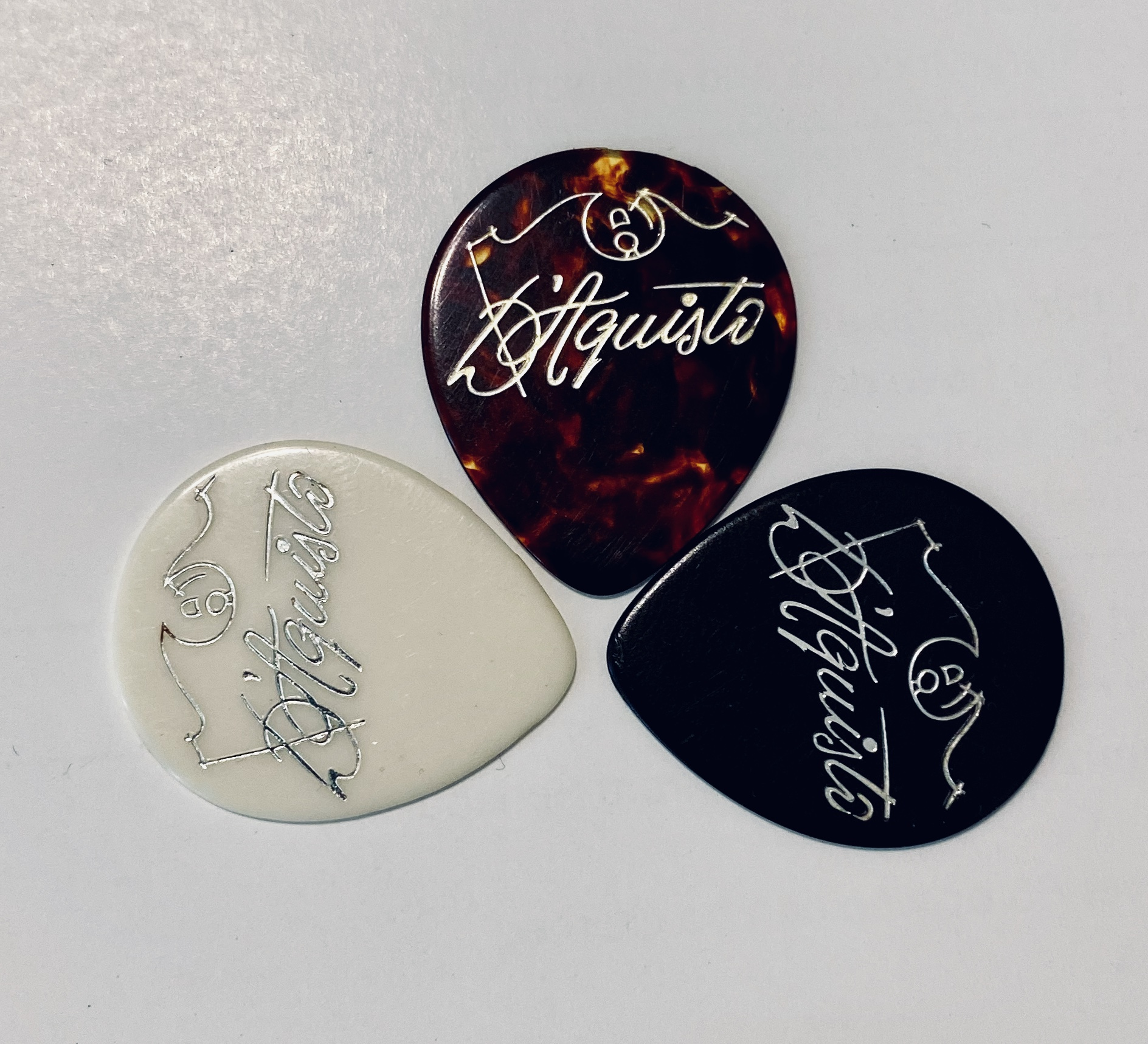
Hall's picks Heavy (white), Medium (tortoise shell), Light (black)

Hall sometimes used a Digitech whammy pedal.

When asked if he ever tried playing solid-body guitars again, he said: "solid bodies are strange to me, I need to feel the body resonating".
