= Quintette du Hot Club de France =

French jazz group

Quintette du Hot Club du France
- Origin: Paris, France
- Genres: Continental jazz, Gypsy jazz, swing
- Years active: 1934–1948
- Past members: Django Reinhardt; Stéphane Grappelli; Louis Vola; Joseph Reinhardt; Roger Chaput

The Quintette du Hot Club de France ("The Quintet of the Hot Club of France"), often abbreviated "QdHCdF" or "QHCF", was a jazz group founded in France in 1934 by the guitarist Django Reinhardt and the violinist Stéphane Grappelli. It was active in one form or another until 1948.

One of the earliest and most significant continental jazz groups in Europe, the Quintette was described by critic Thom Jurek as "one of the most original bands in the history of recorded jazz." In contrast with the "New Orleans Sound" of groups like Louis Armstrong and His Hot Five and Hot Seven, the group (at least in its early incarnations) featured an (at that time, novel) "all strings" lineup with the lead parts taken by virtuoso acoustic guitar and violin, the bass part on double bass in place of tuba or sousaphone, and the rhythm and accompanying chords supplied by additional guitarists, with no drummer.

Their most famous lineup featured Reinhardt, Grappelli, bassist Louis Vola, and rhythm guitarists Roger Chaput and Joseph Reinhardt (Django's brother) although occupants of the latter roles varied from time to time. Later incarnations of the Quintette (and its successors playing in a similar style) sometimes incorporated reeds (clarinet) players in place of Grappelli's violin, and also sometimes added a drummer in place of one of the rhythm guitars.

== History ==
According to Grappelli, the group evolved from a series of backstage jams originated by Django Reinhardt, with Stephane Grappelli, at the Hôtel Claridge on the Champs-Élysées in Paris, where the two were engaged as members of a band led by bassist Louis Vola in the summer of 1934. After a series of informal jam sessions at the Hôtel Claridge, concert promoters Pierre Nourry and Charles Delaunay (leaders of the "Hot Club de France", a society chaired by Hugues Panassié devoted to the appreciation of jazz) urged the formation of a permanent group. With the addition of Reinhardt's brother Joseph on second rhythm guitar, the quintet popularized the gypsy jazz style. The group began its recording career in November 1934, releasing two titles on the Odeon label under the name "Delaunay's Jazz". A December 1934 session produced the first recordings released under the name "Django Reinhardt et le Quintette du Hot Club de France, avec Stéphane Grappelly" (with Django's name misspelled as "Djungo"). Throughout 1935, the group recorded both under this name and as "Stéphane Grappelly and His Hot Four featuring Django Rheinhardt". Grappelli and Reinhardt maintained active schedules as freelance musicians during the early years of the Quintette, recording and performing with French pop artists such as Jean Sablon, Le Petit Mirsha, and Nane Cholet, and with jazz artists such as Coleman Hawkins, Benny Carter, Rex Stewart, Larry Adler, Alix Combelle, and André Ekyan. Between 1934 and 1948, the Quintette du Hot Club de France recorded more than 130 titles in the studio for the Decca, Swing, HMV, Ultraphone, and Odeon labels.

A series of European tours were very successful, with the group enjoying particular popularity in the UK. Several bassists and rhythm guitarists rotated in and out of the group, with Django and Grappelli remaining the sole constants. In 1937, the American jazz singer Adelaide Hall opened a nightclub in Montmartre along with her husband Bert Hicks and called it 'La Grosse Pomme'. She entertained there nightly and hired the Quintette du Hot Club de France as one of the house bands at the club. As World War II broke out in September 1939, the Quintette was on a concert tour of England. Reinhardt, who spoke virtually no English, immediately returned to France, where he thought he would feel safer than in the UK. Grappelli, meanwhile, stayed in England.

Django continued using the Quintette name with a different group, featuring Hubert Rostaing as the first of several clarinetists backed by a more conventional rhythm section with drums, bass and a rhythm guitar played by Django's son Lousson Reinhardt, or his brother Joseph. This version of the Quintette often featured six, not five, players, and was usually billed as "Django et le Quintette du Hot Club de France", or sometimes as Django's "Nouveau Quintette". Due to wartime shortages of material, this version of the Quintette did not issue many recordings (some 70 titles were recorded between 1940 and 1948), although they did issue the first recording of the Django Reinhardt composition Nuages, later to become a jazz standard.

In 1946, after the war, Grappelli and Django re-teamed intermittently under the Quintette banner in an all-string format, while Django continued to record and perform with his "Nouveau Quintette" and as a freelance soloist. As before the war, the Quintette cycled through a number of rhythm guitarists and bassists. This last iteration of the Quintette performed and recorded until about 1948. In early 1949, Django and Grappelli traveled to Rome to play a live engagement. While in Rome, the two made their final recordings together, a total of 70 titles, with a piano trio composed of local musicians.

== Legacy ==
By the late 1940s, Grappelli's style of violin swing was out of fashion, and Django, no longer performing regularly, had become interested in playing modern jazz inspired by American bebop musicians such as Dizzy Gillespie. Django pursued modern jazz until his death in 1953, while Grappelli played and recorded mainstream swing music throughout the 1950s and 1960s when he was active on the music scene.

Throughout the 1950s and 1960s, a handful of European guitarists continued to play acoustic jazz guitar in the style of Django Reinhardt, largely ignored by the jazz press and with few opportunities to record or tour. Musicians such as Baro and Matelo Ferret (both of whom were sometime-members of the Quintette du Hot Club de France), Etienne Patotte Bousquet, and Tchan Tchou Vidal kept the sound of the Quintette alive, often mixing musette waltzes and traditional tunes with the American popular songs and original compositions favored by Django and Grappelli.

In 1973, British guitarist Diz Disley helped persuade Grappelli to return to performing with an all-strings jazz group inspired by the Quintette du Hot Club de France, and Grappelli toured and recorded often using this format during the 1970s. Simultaneously, a revival of the Quintette's sound by a younger generation of artists was underway, with musicians like Fapy Lafertin, Raphaël Faÿs, and Biréli Lagrène helping to establish the Gypsy jazz subgenre as a popular style worldwide.
