= Hot Club de France =

Organization of jazz fans

The Hot Club de France (or HCF) is a French organization of jazz fans dedicated to the promotion of "traditional" jazz, swing, and blues. It was founded in 1931 in Paris, France, by five students of the Lycée Carnot. In 1928, Jacques Bureaux, Hugues Panassié, Charles Delaunay, Jacques Auxenfans, and Elvin Dirat came together to listen to jazz and, later, promote its acceptance in France. The point was to make the public aware of jazz and to defend and promote the style in the face of all opposition. The club began in the fall of 1931 as the Jazz Club Universitaire, as the members were all still students. It was reborn and reimagined in 1932 as the Hot Club de France.

The club was founded by jazz enthusiasts and amateurs for the sole purpose of helping to spread the music to the rest of the world. The members joined together to promote the music in whatever form they could, leading to such developments as the first of many concerts in 1933, the creation of Le Jazz Hot, the club's official magazine, the founding of the Swing music label in 1937, conferences, rare-disc listening sessions, radio talks, and the birth of regional Hot Clubs, among others. This amateur organization played an important role in the diffusion and discovery of jazz in France, and copycat organizations sprang up across Europe to spread the music in countries such as Norway and Britain.

== History ==
At the time the Hot Club began promoting concerts for the Quintette du Hot Club de France, Charles Delaunay was the Secretary General of the club and Hugues Panassié was the President. These two men often occupied different top positions amongst the heads of the group, but which roles each filled during which time period is hard to determine. Both men accomplished a great amount of work with the Club prior to their schism in 1947.

The Hot Club has often adopted a fairly rigid stance in terms of the music it promotes; throughout its history the club has perpetuated the idea that only jazz rooted in the swing and blues traditions of African-American music is "authentic." One example of this rigidity lies in the forced resignation of Charles Delaunay in 1947 over his growing interest in bop during the 1940s; his acceptance of the music alienated other members, notably Hugues Panassie.

Although the Club is rigid in this philosophy, it is not, as some critics have said, only interested in the promotion of jazz styles from the pre-1945 era; the club has promoted the music of musicians it considers to be authentic or in some way rooted in the authentic traditions of swing and blues. These artists include, among others, Earl Bostic, Paul Gonsalves, Aretha Franklin, Jimmy Smith, Wes Montgomery, Ray Charles, Monty Alexander, Stanley Turrentine, and Stanley Jordan.

Around January 1934, Hugues Panassie and Pierre Nourry became the organization's president and secretary, respectively. In August 1938, the club was legally dissolved and refounded with Charles Delaunay as secretary. Presidents also included Madeleine Gautier (1975–83) and Jacques Pescheux. Louis Armstrong was elected honorary President of the Club in 1936. He held that title until his death on 6 July 1971.

The headquarters of the Hot Club de France moved from Paris to Montauban in 1948, to St.-Vrain (near Corbeil-Essonnes) in 1977, and to Nogent-sur-Marne in 1999. The total affiliated Hot Clubs in France has varied widely; there were 17 "affiliated" and two "associated" clubs in 2000. The Hot Club's library is housed at the Discothèque Municipale in Villfranche-de-Rouergue in Southern France; it was begun with Hugues Panassie's core collection, numbering in excess of 6,000 78 rpm records and 9,000 LPs, and has since expanded.

== Bebop schism ==
In 1947, a schism split the HCF into two camps: those headed by Charles Delaunay believed that the new be-bop style was simply a bold experiment at the frontiers of jazz while those led by Hugues Panassie contended that bebop was not jazz. This division between jazz fans in France was what Ludovic Tournes called "the war of jazz."

== Publications ==
Hugues Panassié, in addition to his duties with the club, wrote a monthly jazz column in the world's first jazz magazine, Jazz-Tango-Dancing, which would later become Le Jazz Hot.He likely acquired this position because of his work in Revue du jazz, a magazine that from 1929 to 1931 contained articles written by Phillipe Brun, Stephane Mougin, and the amateur Panassie. Jazz-Tango-Dancing appeared in 1929 as a magazine about the Argentine tango and jazz music. In 1934, Hugues Panassie and Charles Delaunay decided to launch a magazine and to form a band to represent the club's musical point of view; the magazine would become "Jazz Hot: La revue internationale de la musique de Jazz" and the band would become the Quintette du Hot Club de France, promoting a new jazz a cordes or "string jazz" style.

Jazz Hot, the official mouthpiece of the Hot Club, started in 1935; the first issue was a one-page edition printed on the back of a program for a concert given at the Salle Pleyel by Coleman Hawkins on 21 February 1935 and was distributed during admission. Hugues Panassie edited the journal from 1935 to 1946. The writings of Panassie in Jazz Hot, along with other critics and writers, served to help define the new music according to old European traditions but also to place the music geographically and socio-culturally in the United States, in New Orleans, beginning with the African-American minority; this made it the first publication to acknowledge not only the contribution of African-Americans to the music, but their role as its progenitors. The second world war forced the Club to halt publication of Jazz Hot until the mid-40s. The magazine has continued to be published, but after 1946 was no longer under the purview of the Club; this was in part due to the ideological split that forced Charles Delaunay to resign and leave the Club. Delaunay retained control of the magazine and was its main financial backer until 1980.

After 1950, the Bulletin du Hot Club de France became the main publication for the club; it continues in that role to this day. Hugues Panassié edited and published the Bulletin starting in 1950. The magazine Jazz Hot should not be confused with Panassie's book of the same title, Le jazz hot, published in 1934.

== Clubs and venues ==
The Hot Club de France, as it was an association, did not own its own club until 1969. The Club focused its energies on planning and producing events at several major Paris clubs between its inception in 1932 and its acquisition of the Cave du Hot Club de France at 9 rue Pavee in 1969.

Before 1930, the Quintette du Hot Club de France could be heard at the Casanova Club on Rue Fromentin.

The Ecole Normale de Musique de Paris at 78 rue Cardinet, at boulevard Malesherbes, was used by the Hot Club de France for many of its concerts from the 1930s to 1954, beginning with the first performance by the Quintette du Hot Club de France on 2 December 1934. Among the musicians whom the Hot Club presented here were Garland Wilson, Bill Coleman, Benny Carter, and Eddie South. Further jazz concerts were given at the Ecole in 1962, 1966, and 1968.

The Hotel Claridge, at 74 avenue des Champs-Élysées, featured the double bass player Louis Vola's orchestra which played as the evening entertainment during the daily the dansant; this group gave both Django Reinhardt and Stephane Grappelli, who were members, the opportunity to jam between sets. It was during one of these informal jam sessions that members of the Hot Club "discovered" the pair.

The Salle Gaveau at 45 rue La Boetie was regularly used for jazz concerts; Pierre Nourry organized an appearance of the Quintette du Hot Club de France on 20 October 1937 and the group performed there again in March of the next year.

The Salle Pleyel at 252 rue du Faubourg-Saint-Honore was the venue for several important jazz performances beginning in the years before World War II. The Quintette du Hot Club de France and several American artists, including Louis Armstrong, Duke Ellington, and Cab Calloway, performed there in the pre-war years. In 1949, 1952, and 1954 the Festival International de Jazz (popularly, the Paris Jazz Fair) organized by the Hot Club under the direction of Charles Delaunay was held in this hall. Louis Armstrong gave two important concerts in this hall; the concerts were held on 9 and 10 November 1934. It is to these performances that Panassie devotes an entire chapter of his "Douze annees de jazz."

== Tours ==
The Hot Club organized tours for several visiting American musicians; Earl Hines' tour of France in the 1960s was organized through the regional Hot Club affiliate branches.

During the 1960s, the Club also organized tours for Bill Harris, the blues pianist Memphis Slim, and Sister Rosetta Tharpe.

== Quintette du Hot Club de France ==
The Quintette du Hot Club de France was founded with the help of Pierre Nourry and, later, the full backing of the Hot Club. In August 1934, Nourry, then secretary of the Hot Club, vouched for Django Reinhardt and his talents when he brought him and Nin-Nin Reinhardt into the Publicis Studios, a recording studio for amateur musicians. Nourry paid 80 francs of his money to have them recorded and even tracked down a bassist, Juan Fernandez of Martinique, to round out a trio.

The discs made during this session were sent to jazz critics to showcase the new "Jazz a Cordes" style. Pierre Nourry and Charles Delaunay then approached the Odeon label for the purpose of acquiring an audition for the full quintet; on 9 October 1934, the quintet came to the Odeon studio for their audition. On Django's advice, they brought American singer Bert Marshall from the Hotel Claridge band to make for a more commercial recording. The record was declared inspiring by several listeners, but was decried by the executives at Odeon. Nourry, dismayed but undeterred by the rejection by Odeon of the trio's music as too "modernistique" arranged an opening concert for the quintet at the Ecole Normale de Musique in Paris at 78 rue Cardinet on 2 December 1934. The ensemble, however, was still so new it was unnamed: fliers for the concert announced them as "Un orchestre d'un genre nouveau de Jazz Hot," or "An orchestra of a new genre of Hot Jazz," led by "Jungo" Reinhardt.

It was the success of this concert that finally convinced the rest of the Hot Club to officially sponsor the ensemble. It was not until the second official concert of the group that it had a name; for its performance on 16 February 1935, the group officially became Django Reinhardt et le Quintette du Hot Club de France avec Stephane Grappelli. Pierre Nourry also later convinced the chief of Ultraphone to record the music of the quintette at their Montparnasse studio.

Besides the musicians, Panassié, Delaunay, and Nourry were all there, acting as "auteurs" or directors of the session; Panassié, in a discussion about two separate takes of a song, convinced the engineer and producer to use the version where the musicians improvised more freely- despite some minor flaws and mistakes- over the version that was more perfect but less flexible. Between this recording session in 1934 and the last pre-war recording session in August 1939, the Quintette recorded 140 sides.

In its original formation, the Quintette consisted of guitarists Django Reinhardt, his brother Joseph Reinhardt (a.k.a. Nin-Nin), and Roger Chaput, Louis Vola on double bass, and the violinist Stephane Grappelli. The Quintette was a quartet until Django decided he wanted two guitarists to back him on his solos to make the sound of the music more even when he and Stephane switched off during songs.

The Quintette recorded two titles under the name "Delaunay's Jazz" before their official acceptance by the Club, but would be known after the December 1934 concert as the Quintette du Hot Club de France.

Later Charles Delaunay would promote the recording sessions of Django Reinhardt with visiting American artists such as Coleman Hawkins, Benny Carter, Eddie South, Bill Coleman, and Barney Bigard among others.

The Quintette remained active from 1935 until 1939, when Grappelli decided to remain in England and Django left the tour they were on together to return home to France; new recording sessions happened with the original group in 1946 and from 1947 to 1948.

== Swing ==
The Hot Club de France, pushed by Charles Delaunay, sponsored recording sessions on the Swing label. Due to their work, among others, Coleman Hawkins and Dicky Wells (both 1937), Bill Coleman (1937–8), and Benny Carter (1938) were all recorded for the label.

The "Swing" record label was one of the first record labels devoted exclusively to jazz., It was established in Paris in 1937 by Delaunay; artists and repertory were placed under the joint direction of Charles Delaunay and Hugues Panassie. The recordings were made through the French branch of EMI.

Control of the "Swing" label passed in 1948 to Vogue, which Charles Delaunay had joined as "manager of artists and repertory" while EMI retained the back catalogue of Swing's recordings. Throughout the 1950s, Vogue continued to release records under the Swing label.

== Festivals ==
The Hot Club de France was responsible for or played a role in the creation of several jazz festivals, chief among them the first international Jazz festival in Nice, France from 22 to 28 February 1948, the Festival de Jazz a Montauban, and the Festival International de Jazz in Paris. Few years after the initial concert in 1933, the Hot Club exerted a type of quasi-monopoly over the organization of jazz concerts, discs, radio programs, and general knowledge on the subject in France.

The first of many concerts sponsored by the club took place on 1 February 1933 and featured Garland Wilson and Freddy Johnson.

The Nice Jazz Festival was founded by Hugues Panassié and lasted from 22 to 28 February 1948. It featured a repertory of traditional jazz, swing, and bop music and was the first international jazz festival.

It featured Louis Armstrong's All-Stars, among other musicians. Louis Armstrong, as honorary President (having received the title in 1936 by vote of the Hot Club) began the festival. Warren "Baby" Dodds also performed at this festival, and was known to tune his drums to the different pianos he was to jam with during the performances given there. It is probably this festival that was disbanded in favor of promoting the 1949 Festival International de Jazz, so as to avoid splitting the pool of artists and to unify resources.

The Festival International de Jazz (popularly the Paris Jazz Fair) was begun in 1948 and was put on by the Hot Club; Charles Delaunay was the founder. It ran again in 1948, 1952, and 1954. The first festival featured Coleman Hawkins, Kenny Clarke, John Lewis, Erroll Garner, and Howard McGhee, among other artists. The festival in 1949 featured Sidney Bechet and the Charlie Parker Quintet with Miles Davis, along with Dizzy Gillespie, Thelonious Monk, Mary Lou Williams, Gerry Mulligan, Tadd Dameron, and Lips Page.

In 1952, a performance by Jazz at the Philharmonic ended the festival. This festival was a celebration of old and young musicians which helped promote different aspects of the developing music, as well as allowing musicians like Miles Davis to see another side of the music and its fans.

In early 1949, Sidney Bechet was approached by Charles Delaunay to perform at the Festival International de Jazz. This invitation likely came about due to his recording work with bands in America formed by Hugues Panassie and Mezz Mezzrow, and the 1948 offer by Hugues Panassie of $1,500 for a week's tour in France. This tour was never scheduled due to French currency restrictions, and the opportunity for Bechet to be featured in a group with Mezz Mezzrow at the Hot Club-sponsored 1948 Nice Jazz Festival was precluded by his contract with Jazz, Ltd.; Bob Wilber made the trip in his stead.

Bechet almost did not get signed to play the festival, which also almost did not exist; Nicole Barclay, an associate of a rival jazz festival, with which Hugues Panassié was associated, almost convinced the star to play for her festival. Charles Delaunay convinced Barclay and her associates to join forces to create a bigger festival, for which they were able to give Bechet an increased wage. This is but one of the many episodes that came about due to the post-war rift between Panassie and Delaunay.

The festival took place from 8 to 16 May 1949 and featured several headlining artists, backed by different bands on the main stages, as well as jam sessions combining different artists; Sidney Bechet played with at least five groups through the first and second days of the festival including "Claude Luter's band," and a band composed of "Lips Page, Russell Moore, and a French rhythm section."

The Festival de Jazz a Montauban was organized by the Hot Club from 1982 on, but the Club ceased to have involvement with that festival in later years.

== The Hot Club and the Résistance ==
During the Second World War, the Hot Club provided the French Resistance a great cover to use to gain information on German troops and defenses to send back to Paris and, ultimately, to transmit to England. Charles Delaunay used the Hot Club as a cover to pass information on the Germans to English troops. He traveled through France organizing concerts for the Hot Club under the official sanction of the Propaganda Abteilung but used his travels as a means to make contacts with the underground. His codename within the British Special Operations Executive was "Benny" and his network was "Cart," in honor of saxophonist Benny Carter. By 1943, the Germans had caught on to his intelligence work; they raided the Hot Club and took Delaunay and his secretary, Madeleine Germaine, for questioning. Delaunay was freed after five and a half hours of interrogation but both his secretary and the head of the Marseille branch of the Hot Club were sentenced to concentration camps, where they perished.

Jacques Bureau (fr), co-founder of the Club, also began working for the Resistance; in 1944 he returned to France with help from the British and joined the maquis to defend his country. He was captured soon afterwards by the Gestapo and spent six months in the Fresnes prison outside Paris.

Django Reinhardt's song "Nuages" became one of the anthems of the French Resistance; it was recorded with the "Nouveau Quintette du Hot Club de France" on 1 October 1940. More than 100,000 copies of the 78 were sold after its debut at the Salle Pleyel.

== See also ==
Site for the "Jazz à Montauban" Festival
