= François Vola =

Guitarist and composer François Vola was born in Nice, France, in 1953. He is the godson of Louis Vola, the bassist with Django Reinhardt's Hot Club of France. He started playing guitar semiprofessionally at the age of 14. In 1974, at age 20, he moved to the US, studied bluegrass and swing, and played in several bands.

Vola played on several albums and recorded three of his own, in 1983 Francois Vola with fiddler Byron Berline (Stephen Stills, Linda Ronstadt, The Rolling Stones) and banjoist John Hickman. In 1996 he recorded an electric jazz album, Old World, New World with mandolinist Emory Lester; and in 1997, A Night in Conover, an acoustic jazz album, with Django's son Babik Reinhardt and Emory Lester.

In the US, Vola played on stage with Tony Rice, Wyatt Rice, Byron Berline, David Grisman, Bill Keith, Emory Lester, Babik Reinhardt, Tony Williamson, Dan Crary, Roland White, and others. He played several times at the prestigious Merle Watson fest and other festivals and events. He won two awards from the North Carolina School of the Arts for his compositions, and was invited to play one of his pieces with the North Carolina's Western Piedmont Symphony.

In 1998 Vola moved back to France where he continues his musical career. He plays guitars that he builds. In 2019 he released a bluegrass CD, "Back To Bluegrass", which was well received by music critics.

Vola is a dual French-US citizen.
