= Charles Delaunay =

French author and jazz expert

Charles Delaunay on 52nd Street, New York City, October 1946 (photograph by William P. Gottlieb)

Charles Delaunay (18 January 1911 – 16 February 1988) was a French author, jazz expert, co-founder and long-term leader of the Hot Club de France.

== Biography ==
Born in Paris, France, the son of painters Robert Delaunay and Sonia Delaunay, Charles Delaunay was one of the founders of the Hot Club de France. Together with Hugues Panassié he initiated the Quintette du Hot Club de France with Django Reinhardt and Stephane Grappelli. He also organised concerts, for example with Benny Carter, Louis Armstrong, Duke Ellington, among others.

In 1935, together with Panassié he founded Le Jazz Hot, one of the oldest jazz magazines. From 1937, Delaunay shared artists and repertory responsibilities with Panassié on a new record label, Disques Swing ("Swing Records"). As well as the Hot Club ensemble, he has been the manager of French jazz guitarist Django Reinhardt, and issued recording by visiting Americans such as Dicky Wells and Coleman Hawkins, as well as Carter. It was among the first record labels dedicated exclusively to jazz. Jazz hot ceased publication in summer 1939, being revived in March 1945. During World War II, Delaunay was a member of the Resistance, but continued leading the Hot Club. In 1948, Delaunay founded the record label Disques Vogue and was one of the first people to introduce bop into France, but Panassié did not even consider the new music to be jazz. Delaunay was the author of Hot Discography which ran to five editions in England, France and the US (the first jazz discography) and also worked as an artist.

Delaunay died in Vineuil Saint Firmin (Oise, France) of Parkinson's disease in 1988.

== Works ==
- Django Reinhardt- Souvenirs, Paris 1954, Editions Jazz-Hot, English London 1961
- Hot Discography, 1936, latest as New Hot Discography 1982
- Hot Iconography (lithographies of jazz musicians)
- with Robert Goffin Jazz 47
- Django mon frère, Paris 1968
- De la Vie et du Jazz
- Delaunay's Dilemma (autobiography, also title of a John Lewis composition) 1983
