= Roger Chaput =

French musician, painter and banjoist

- Born: Roger Marcel Chaput; 19 May 1909; Montluçon, France
- Died: 22 December 1994 (aged 85) Toulon, France
- Genres: Jazz, gypsy jazz
- Occupations: Guitarist, composer, painter, cartoonist
- Instruments: Guitar, banjo, mandolin
- Years active: 1920s – 1995
- Formerly of: Quintette du Hot Club de France

Roger Chaput (19 May 1909 – 22 December 1994) was a French jazz guitarist and visual artist known for his work with the Quintette du Hot Club de France.

== Life ==
Chaput grew up in the Parisian suburb known as Ménilmontant, where he learned to play the guitar and mandolin. He first performed on banjo in the bal-musette groups of Michel Péguri and Albert Carrara.

In 1931, he joined the jazz ensemble of double-bassist Louis Vola. In 1934, Chaput and Vola joined the Quintette du Hot Club de France with Django Reinhardt, Stéphane Grappelli and Joseph Reinhardt. He performed as a rhythm guitarist on many of the famous recordings that were made by the group, including "Daphne", "Belleville" and "Ultrafox".

In 1938, he left the group and became a member of the Hot Club Swing Stars until 1943. He also played with Eddie South, Bill Coleman, Dicky Wells, Gus Viseur, Richard Blareau, Alix Combelle, André Ekyan, and Buck Clayton. In 1965, he recorded the album Tonton Guitare 1 under his own name. This was followed by Tonton Guitare 2 in 1970.

Chaput also worked as a cartoonist and oil painter and his work has been published in the French magazine Jazz Hot.

== Solo discography ==
- Tonton Guitare 1 (Disques Du Cavalier, 1965)
- Tonton Guitare 2 (Disques Du Cavalier, 1970)
