= Jazz Magazine =

French magazine about jazz music

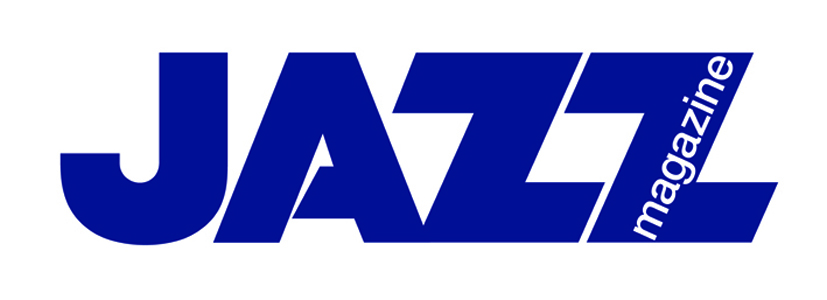

- Issue 1, cover dated December 1954
- Editorial director & editor-in-chief: Frédéric Goaty
- Editor: Yazid Kouloughli
- Categories: Jazz
- Frequency: Monthly
- Founder: Nicole Barclay
- Founded: 1954
- First issue: Dec. 1954
- Company: Jazz and Cie
- Country: France
- Based in: Paris, France
- Language: French
- Website: https://www.jazzmagazine.com
- ISSN: 0021-566X

Jazz Magazine is a French magazine dedicated to jazz.

== History ==
The magazine was created in 1954 by Nicole and Eddie Barclay with Jacques Souplet. Souplet had previously worked as director for the magazine Jazz Hot, but left to join the Barclay's at their eponymous record label Barclay, where he suggested they start a jazz magazine. Nicole Barclay persuaded her husband to start the magazine, and she is now credited as the magazine's founder.

The first issue's cover was designed by Pierre Mani, the designer of Barclay's record sleeves. It featured a photograph of Lionel Hampton.

Initially, the magazine lost money, so Frank Ténot and Daniel Filipacchi were brought in and took over from the founders. Jean-Louis Ginibre, was editor-in-chief from 1962 to 1971, and was succeeded by Philippe Carles, who stepped down in 2007. Frédéric Goaty took over as editor-in-chief in 2009.

An English language edition of the magazine was announced in 1956, with headquarters to be set in New York. In 1970, Jazz Magazine Productions was set up to improve the jazz scene in France by holding more concert.

In 2009, Jazz Magazine was combined with another jazz magazine, Jazzman. It was purchased in 2014 by a group of investors chaired by Edouard Rencker, and published by Jazz & Cie beginning from issue 662 (June 2014). In 2017, the magazine had approximately 7,000 subscribers, and sold between 5-6,000 copies each month on newsstands.
