= Hugues Panassié =

French music critic, producer, and impresario (1912–1974)

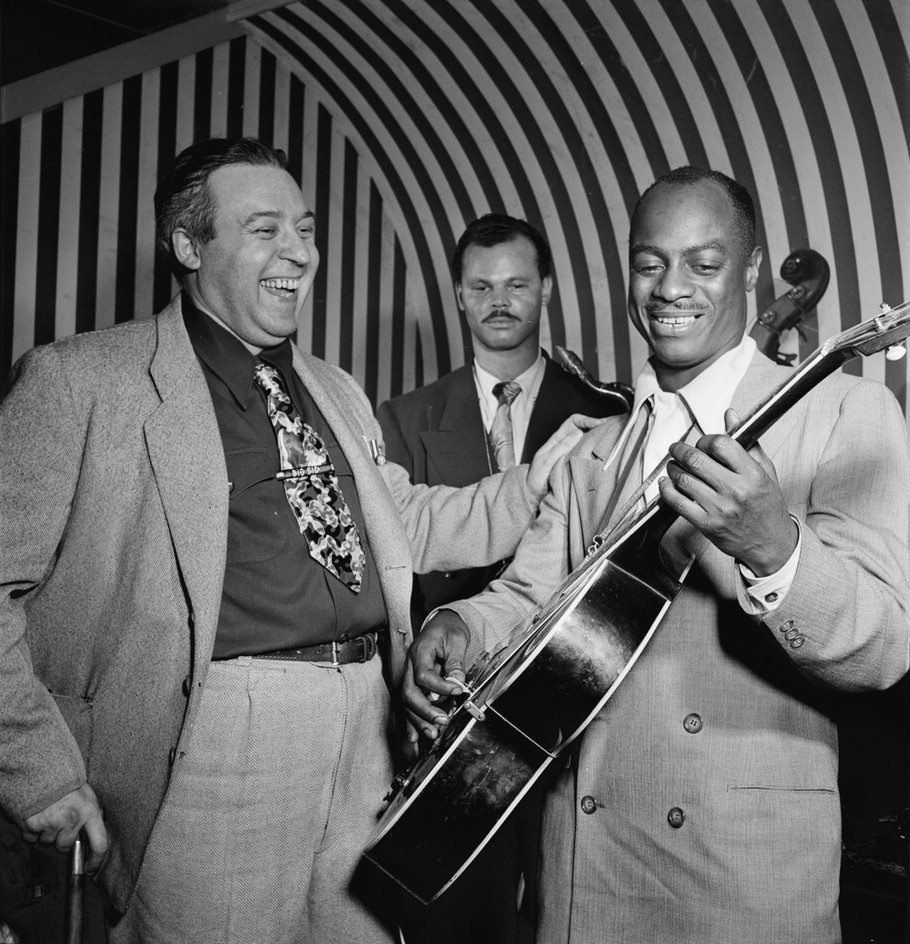
- Hugues Panassié, Red Prysock, and Tiny Grimes, New York City, circa 1946–1948 (William P. Gottlieb, photo)
- Born: February 27, 1912; Paris, France
- Died: December 8, 1974 (aged 62); Montauban, France
- Occupations: Jazz critic, record producer, author
- Years active: 1930s–1970s
- Organizations: Hot Club de France
- Known for: Founding the Hot Club de France, promoting traditional jazz
- Spouse: Madeleine Gautier (m. 1949)

Hugues Panassié (27 February 1912 in Paris – 8 December 1974 in Montauban) was a French critic, record producer, and impresario of traditional jazz.

== Career ==
Panassié was born in Paris. When he was fourteen, he was stricken with polio, which limited his extracurricular physical activities. He took up the saxophone and fell in love with jazz in the late 1920s. (Note: No. 243, December 1974, pps. 16–18) Panassié was the founding president of the Hot Club de France in 1932. In 1935, with Charles Delaunay, he co-founded Jazz Hot, a monthly jazz magazine; its first issue appeared that year, and Mezzrow later recalled that it "soon had dozens of rivals, in almost as many languages, all through Europe". He produced recording sessions in New York featuring Mezz Mezzrow and Tommy Ladnier from November 1938 to January 1939.

During World War II, the Germans occupied the northern half of France beginning June 1940. The Nazis regarded jazz as low music — music from an inferior people. Jacques Demêtre, in the 2014 book by Steve Cushing, Pioneers of the Blues Revival, said that people had expected the Germans to ban jazz entirely. But instead, they only banned American jazz and American tunes. Demêtre explained that many American standards were in French with alternate titles. Panassié, for example, managed to keep broadcasting American jazz on his radio station submitting to censors obtuse French translations of American song titles, and even relabeling records. Panassié's friend Mezz Mezzrow describes a particular example in his 1946 autobiography Really the Blues:

[The Nazi censors] were shown a record labeled "La Tristesse de Saint Louis," which translates the "Sadness of Saint Louis," and Panassié offered the explanation that it was a sad song written about poor Louis the Ninth, lousy with that old French tradition. What Cerberus didn't know was that underneath the phony label was a genuine RCA Victor one giving Louis Armstrong as the recording artist and stating the real name of the number: "The Saint Louis Blues."

== Selected controversies ==
In a changing world of jazz, Panassié was an ardent exponent of traditional jazz — strictly Dixieland. He harbored a particular love of style similar to that of Louis Armstrong from the 1930s. Panassié criticized West Coast jazz as inauthentic, partly because most musicians were white and also sounded white. In his book, The Real Jazz, Panassié ranked Benny Goodman as a detestable clarinetist whose sterile intonation was inferior to black players Jimmy Noone and Omer Simeon. Mezz Mezzrow became Panassié's lone example of a white musician who played jazz authentically. Panassié dismissed bebop as "a form of music distinct from jazz." (Note: No. 87, April 1959, pg. 39) (Note: No. 101, October 1960, pps. 6–7)

As an extremely gifted musician, Parker gradually gave up jazz in favor of bop …

He [Parker] could play fine jazz in his early days

A gifted musician [Miles Davis], but one who by now has entirely deviated from jazz to 'cool' music.

It would be truer to say that he [Thelonious Monk] was an initiator of bop—for whereas his music harmonically resembles bop, rhythmically it is not. He is an eccentric musician who has strayed far from jazz, but has never completely turned his back on it as the bop players have.

— Guide to Jazz (1956)

In 1974, he accused Miles Davis, Archie Shepp, Pharoah Sanders, and others as being "traitors to the cause of true black music," that, according to Panassié, they claimed to support. (Note: No. 234, January 1974, pg. 7)

Some historians opine that Panassié hurt musicians by creating a wedge between blacks and whites by his insistence that black jazz was superior. Some authors ridicule his harsh attacks against more open jazz critics, who he characterized in his Bulletin du Hot Club de France as being full of "crass ignorance," "thick incompetence," and "triumphant stupidity." (Note: No. 220, January 1973, pg. 5) His ad hominem attacks included phrases that translate to "repugnant glavioteur," (Note: Glavioteur is an English translation of the French word glavioteux, from glaviot, an alteration of claviot — Bordeaux dialect for a type of parasitic sheep or bovine disease that, among other things, causes heavy mucus. A glavioteur, in slang, is one who issues a thick sputum while speaking.) "formidable imbecile," and "donkey of the pen." (Note: Donkey of the Pen, translated from Panassié's expression, âne bâté de la plume, figuratively means an unsophisticated music critic who takes themselves seriously and believes they are carrying enlightening knowledge (for readers), when in fact, they are carrying knowledge gained by others — with no comprehension, perspective, or scope — producing ridiculous results; a donkey of the pen is an idiot or moron with good conscience, blissfully satisfied with themselves.) (Note: No. 89, July–August 1959, pg. 32) (Note: No. 242, November 1974, pg. 22)

== Political views ==
In addition to being a strong exponent of Dixieland jazz, and a harsh critic of jazz musicians who strayed from it, Panassié was a far-right monarchist who belonged to the anti-Semitic organisation Action Française and wrote a jazz column for the extreme-right magazine L'Insurgé.

== Discography ==
In 1956, RCA Victor published an LP record, Guide to Jazz (LPM 1393), a compilation including 16 recordings by prominent jazz artists with liner notes by Panassiè.

== Books ==
Books by Panassié

- Le Jazz Hot (1934); OCLC 906165198
- La musique de Jazz et le Swing (1943)
- Les rois du Jazz (1944)
- La véritable musique de Jazz (in French) (1946)

The Real Jazz (English editions)
English versions translated by Anne Sorelle Williams, (Note: Anne Sorelle Williams (maiden; 1916–1989), was an artist and music editor for Columbia Pictures. She was married to Morris P. Glushien (1909–2006), a lawyer. Ruth Wedgwood, a lawyer, is one of their daughters.) adapted for American publication by Charles Edward Smith

1st ed. (in English), (1942). Smith & Durrell, Inc. 1942 – via Internet Archive. LCCN 43-296; OCLC 892252.
1st ed. (in English), Smith & Durrell, Inc., 5th printing (1946); OCLC 221703551, 562846079
Rev. ed. (in English), A.S. Barnes (1950); OCLC 500347906
Rev. ed. (in English), A.S. Barnes (1960); LCCN 60-10858; OCLC 391887.
Rev. ed. (in English), Jazz Book Club (1967); OCLC 795423457
Rev. ed. (in English), Greenwood Press (1971); OCLC 495542043
Rev. ed. (in English), (1973). Greenwood Press. 1973. ISBN 9780837171234 – via Internet Archive. LCCN 73-13328; OCLC 847383480, 701594
Rev. ed. (in English), Greenwood Press (1976); OCLC 251717851
Rev. ed. (in English), Gardners Books (2007); OCLC 172977814

- Douze années de Jazz – Souvenirs (1946)
- Cinq Mois à New-York. Paris: Éditions Corrêa. 1947. LCCN 57-46178; OCLC 4980868 (all editions).
- Jazz Panorama (1950)
- Quand Mezzrow Enregistre – Histoire des Disques de Milton Mezzrow et Tommy Ladnier (in French). Paris: Éditions Robèrt Laffon. 1952 – via Internet Archive. LCCN 53-31558; OCLC 4794578 (all editions).
- Discographie critique des meilleurs disques de Jazz 1st ed., Éditions Correa (fr) (1951); OCLC 4210366
  New ed., Éditions Robert Laffont (1958); OCLC 1533884
- Histoire du vrai Jazz, Éditions Robert Laffont (1959); OCLC 489963102
- La bataille du Jazz, Éditions Albin Michel (1965); OCLC 8638341, 164766253
- Louis Armstrong, Nouvelles Editions Latines (fr) (1969); OCLC 9116291
- Louis Armstrong, Scribners (1971) ISBN 8429733078
- Louis Armstrong (The Roots of Jazz), Da Capo Press (1980) ISBN 0306796112
- Panassié, Hugues; Gautier, Madeleine (1954). Dictionnaire du Jazz (new and revised ed.; enlarged) (in French). Paris: Éditions Robèrt Laffon – via Internet Archive. LCCN 54-35728 (1954 ed.); LCCN 66-67364 (1966 ed.); LCCN 72-322636 (1971 ed.); LCCN 81-132216 (1980 ed.); ISBN 2-2260-1028-9; OCLC 1741566 (all editions).
- Monsieur Jazz: Entretiens avec Pierre Casalta [Mr. Jazz: Interviews with Pierre Casalta] (in French). 1975. LCCN 76-451364; ISBN 2-2340-0338-5.

Guide to Jazz & Dictionary of Jazz (English editions)
English versions by Desmond Flower (1907–1997), (Note: Desmond John Newman Flower (1907–1997) was Newman Flower's son, and successor of his father's firm, Cassell & Co.) A.A. Gurwitch (1925–2013) (Note: Arnold "Andy" Gurwitch (1925–2013) was a lover of big band jazz who worked as the road manager for Louis Armstrong. He graduated from Brooklyn Law School and began practicing law in 1956. For many years, until his retirement, Gurwitch was head of the international relations department of ASCAP. (Obituary: "Arnold "Andy" Gurwitch," Journal News, May 7, 2013)) (ed.)
Beginning with 1956 English versions, intro by intro by Louis Armstrong
1st ed. (in French), Éditions Robert Laffont (1954); OCLC 5761014
1st ed. (in English), Houghton Mifflin (1956); OCLC 851152
1st ed. (in English), Cassell (1956); OCLC 906361724, 555049254
1st ed. (in French), Éditions Robert Laffont (1957); OCLC 641969732
1st ed. (in English), Jazz Book Club (1959); OCLC 3323412
1st ed. (in English; microfilm), The Riverside Press (1956); OCLC 65931946
New ed. (in French), Éditions Albin Michel (1971); OCLC 1741566
1st ed. (in English), Greenwood Press (1973); OCLC 600959 ISBN 0837167663
New ed. (in French), Éditions Albin Michel (1980); OCLC 7652674
3rd ed. (in French), Éditions Albin Michel (1987); OCLC 35672666

== Family ==
Panassié spent five months in New York City in the company of Madeleine Gautier, his assistant. In 1949, they married, returned to France, and settled in Montauban at 65 Faubourg du Moustier.
