= Louis Vola =

French jazz double-bassist

- Born: 6 July 1902; La Seyne-sur-Mer, France
- Died: 15 August 1990 (aged 88); Paris
- Genres: Jazz
- Occupation(s): Musician, singer-songwriter
- Instrument(s): Bass, Accordion

Louis Vola (La Seyne-sur-Mer, France, 6 July 1902 – 15 August 1990, Paris) was a French double-bassist known for his work with the Quintette du Hot Club de France. He is the godfather of guitarist Francois Vola.

As well as the Hot Club de France, Vola played bass for Ray Ventura, Duke Ellington and singer Charles Trenet. He was also an accomplished accordionist.

In 1934 he was a founding member of the Quintette du Hot Club de France. In a 1976 interview, Vola recalled that he discovered Joseph and Django Reinhardt playing guitars together on a beach at Toulon. Vola invited them to play with his band. Violinist Stéphane Grappelli and guitarist Roger Chaput were members of Vola's jazz ensemble. Vola later left the Quintette but eventually rejoined.
