= Éric Holder =

French novelist (1960-2019)

Éric Holder (5 April 1960 – 22 January 2019) was a French novelist.

His novels, Mademoiselle Chambon, L'Homme de chevet and Bienvenue parmi nous were adapted to the cinema in 2009 and 2012. He was awarded several literary prizes, including the Prix littéraire de la vocation (1989), the Prix Fénéon (1989), the Prix Thyde Monnier (1989), the Prix Décembre (1994), the Prix Roger Nimier (1996), and the Prix Service Littéraire (2008). He died on 23 January 2019, aged 58.

== Works ==
- 1984: Nouvelles du Nord, Le Dilettante
- 1985: Manfred ou l'hésitation, Éditions du Seuil
- 1989: Duo forte, Grasset, 1989 (Prix Fénéon, Prix littéraire de la vocation, Prix Thyde Monnier).
- 1993: L'Ange de Bénarès, Flammarion
- 1994: Bruits de cœurs, Les Silènes
- 1994: La Belle Jardinière, Prix Décembre.
- 1995: L'Homme de chevet, Flammarion
- 1995: La Tolérance, illustrations by Jean-Marie Queneau, éditions de la Goulotte
- 1996: Deux Poèmes, illustrations by Jean-Marie Queneau, Claude Stassart-Springer, éditions de la Goulotte
- 1996: En compagnie des femmes, Le Dilettante (Prix Roger-Nimier)
- 1996: Mademoiselle Chambon, Flammarion
- 1997: Jours en douce, Flohic éditions
- 1997: On dirait une actrice, Librio
- 1998: Nouvelles du Nord et d'ailleurs , Le Dilettante
- 1998: Bienvenue parmi nous, Flammarion
- 2000: Les Cabanes, illustrations by Claude Stassart-Springer, éditions de la Goulotte
- 2000: Awélé, illustrations by Claude Stassart-Springer, éditions de la Goulotte
- 2000: La Correspondante, Flammarion
- 2001: Masculins singuliers
- 2002: Hongroise, Flammarion
- 2003: L'Histoire de Chirac, Flammarion
- 2005: Les Sentiers délicats, Le Dilettante
- 2007: La Baïne, Le Seuil
- 2008: De loin on dirait une île, Le Dilettante, (Prix Service Littéraire).
- 2009: Bella Ciao. Cadre rouge. Paris: Le Seuil. p. 180. ISBN 978-2020975353..
- 2011: Embrasez-moi, Le Dilettante
- 2012: L'alphabet des oiseaux, illustrations de Nathalie Azémar, éditions Delphine Montalant
- 2015: La saison des bijoux, Le Seuil

=== Prefaces, postfaces ===
- 1998: Gilles Tordjman, C'est déjà tout de suite, Céra-nrs éditions
- 2002: Michel Laclos, Mots croisés, Zulma
- 2009: Jean-Paul and Michel Mazot, Chirac en Gévaudan, Atlantica
- 2010: François de Cornière, Ces moments-là, Castor Astral
