= Stéphane Grappelli =

French jazz violinist (1908–1997)

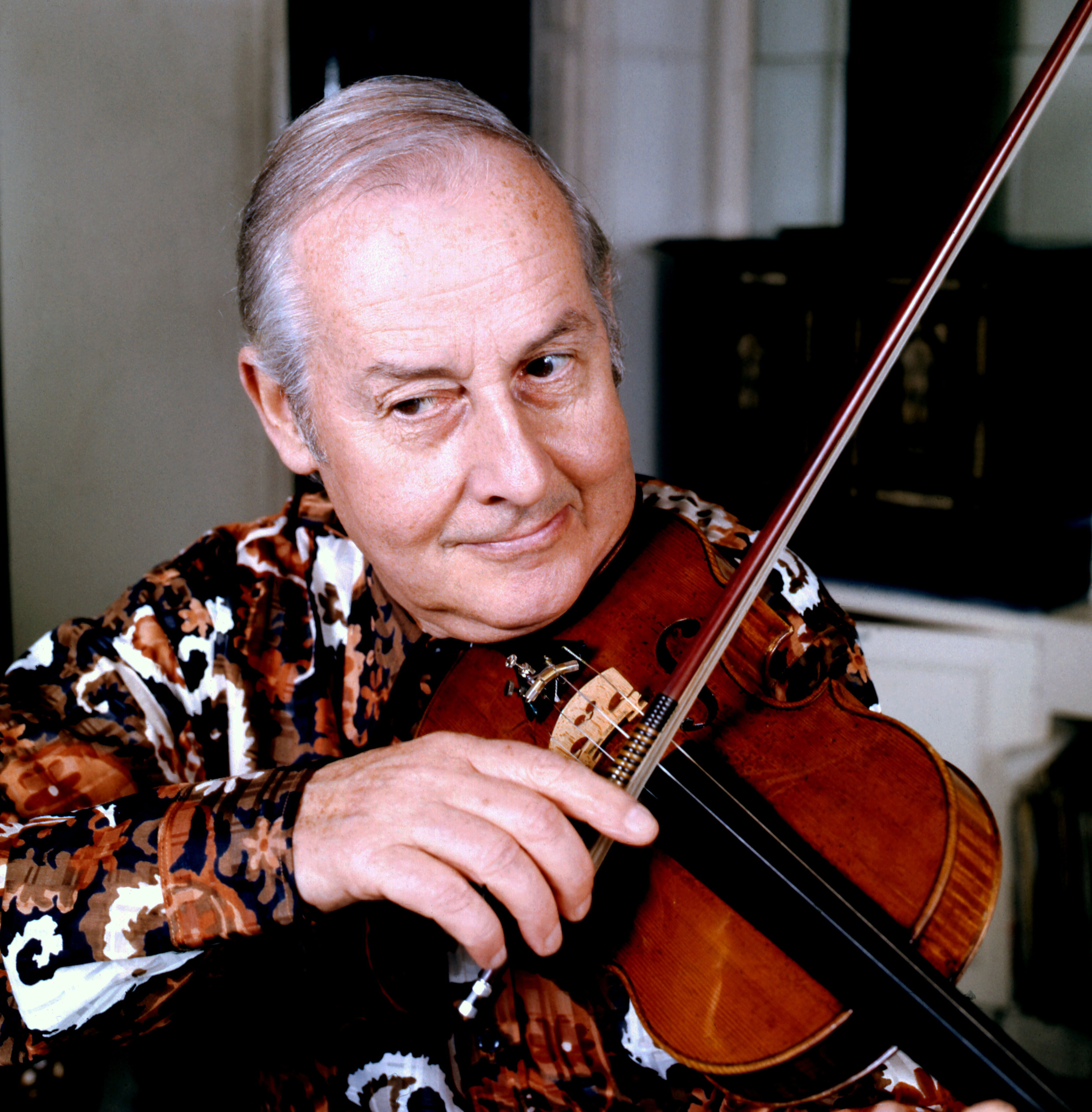
- Grappelli in 1976, by Allan Warren

Background information
- Born: 26 January 1908; Paris, France
- Died: 1 December 1997 (aged 89) Paris, France
- Genres: Swing; continental jazz; gypsy jazz
- Occupation: Musician
- Instruments: Violin; piano; saxophone; accordion
- Formerly of: Django Reinhardt; Quintette du Hot Club de France; Yehudi Menuhin; Oscar Peterson; David Grisman

Stéphane Grappelli (French pronunciation: [stefan ɡʁapɛli]; 26 January 1908 – 1 December 1997) was a French jazz violinist. He is best known as a founder of the Quintette du Hot Club de France with guitarist Django Reinhardt in 1934. It was one of the first all-string jazz bands. He has been called "the grandfather of jazz violinists" and continued playing concerts around the world well into his eighties.

For the first three decades of his career, he was billed using a gallicised spelling of his last name, Grappelly, reverting to the Italian spelling Grappelli in 1969. The latter is used when referring to the violinist, including reissues of his early work.

== Biography ==
=== Early years ===
Grappelli was born at Hôpital Lariboisière in Paris, France. His father, Italian Ernesto Grappelli, was born in Alatri, Lazio, while his French mother, Anna Emilie Hanoque, was from St-Omer. Ernesto was a scholar who taught Italian, sold translations, and wrote articles for local journals. Grappelli's mother died when he was five, leaving his father to care for him. Although he was residing in France when World War I began, Ernesto was still an Italian citizen, and was consequently drafted into the Italian Army in 1914.

Having written about American dancer Isadora Duncan, who was living in Paris, Ernesto appealed to her to care for his son. Stéphane was enrolled in Duncan's dance school at the age of six, and he learned to love French Impressionist music. With the war approaching, Duncan fled the country; she turned over her château to be used as a military hospital. Ernesto subsequently entrusted his son to a Catholic orphanage. Grappelli said of this time:

I look back at it as an abominable memory ... The place was supposed to be under the eye of the government, but the government looked elsewhere. We slept on the floor, and often were without food. There were many times when I had to fight for a crust of bread.

Grappelli compared his early life to a Dickens novel, and said that he once tried to eat flies to ease his hunger. He stayed at the orphanage until his father returned from the war in 1918, settling them in an apartment in Barbès. Having been sickened by his experiences with the Italian military, Ernesto took Stéphane to city hall, pulled two witnesses off the street, and had his son naturalized as a French citizen on 28 July 1919. His first name Stefano was Gallicized to Stéphane.

Grappelli began playing the violin at the age of 12 on a three-quarter-sized violin, which his father purchased by pawning a suit. Although Stéphane received violin lessons, he preferred to learn the instrument on his own:

My first lessons were in the streets, watching how other violinists played ... The first violinist that I saw play was at the Barbès metro station, sheltered under the overhead metro tracks. When I asked how one should play, he exploded in laughter. I left, completely humiliated with my violin under my arm.

After a brief period of independent learning, Grappelli was enrolled at the Conservatoire de Paris on 31 December 1920, which his father hoped would give him a chance to learn music theory, ear-training, and solfeggio. In 1923, Grappelli graduated with a second-tier medal. Around this time, his father married a woman named Anna Fuchs and moved to Strasbourg. Grappelli remained in Paris because he disliked Fuchs.

At the age of 15, Grappelli began busking full-time to support himself. His playing caught the attention of an elderly violinist, who invited him to accompany silent films in the pit orchestra at the Théâtre Gaumont. He played there for six hours daily over a two-year period. During orchestra breaks, he visited Le Boudon, a brasserie, where he would listen to songs from an American proto-jukebox. Here he was introduced to jazz. In 1928, Grappelli was a member of the orchestra at the Ambassador Hotel while bandleader Paul Whiteman and jazz violinist Joe Venuti were performing there. Jazz violinists were rare, and though Venuti played mainly commercial jazz themes and seldom improvised, Grappelli was struck by his bowing when he played "Dinah". As a result, Grappelli began developing a jazz-influenced style of violin music.

Grappelli lived with Michel Warlop, a classically trained violinist. Warlop admired Grappelli's jazz-inspired playing, while Grappelli envied Warlop's income. After experimenting with the piano, Grappelli stopped playing the violin, choosing simplicity, a new sound, and paid performances over familiarity. He began playing piano in a big band led by a musician called Grégor. In 1929, after a night of drinking, Grégor learned that Grappelli used to play the violin. Grégor borrowed a violin and asked Grappelli to improvise over "Dinah". Delighted by what he heard, Grégor urged Grappelli to return to playing the violin.

In 1930, Grégor ran into financial trouble. He was involved in an automobile accident that resulted in several deaths, and fled to South America to avoid arrest. Grégor's band reunited as a jazz ensemble under the leadership of pianist Alain Romans and saxophonist André Ekyan. While playing with this band, Grappelli met gypsy jazz guitarist Django Reinhardt in 1931. Looking for a violinist interested in jazz, he invited Grappelli to play with him in his caravan. Although the two played for hours that afternoon, their commitments to their respective bands prevented them from pursuing a career together.

In the summer of 1934 they met again while both were engaged as members of a band led by bassist Louis Vola playing at the Hôtel Claridge on the Champs-Élysées in Paris, and began a musical partnership. Pierre Nourry, the secretary of the Hot Club de France, invited Reinhardt and Grappelli to form the Quintette du Hot Club de France, with Louis Vola on bass and Joseph Reinhardt and Roger Chaput on guitar.

Also located in the Montmartre district was the artistic salon of R-26, at which Grappelli and Reinhardt performed regularly.

The Quintette du Hot Club de France disbanded in 1939 upon the outbreak of World War II; Grappelli was in London at the time, and stayed there for the duration of the war. In 1940, jazz pianist George Shearing made his debut as a sideman in Grappelli's band.

=== Post-war ===
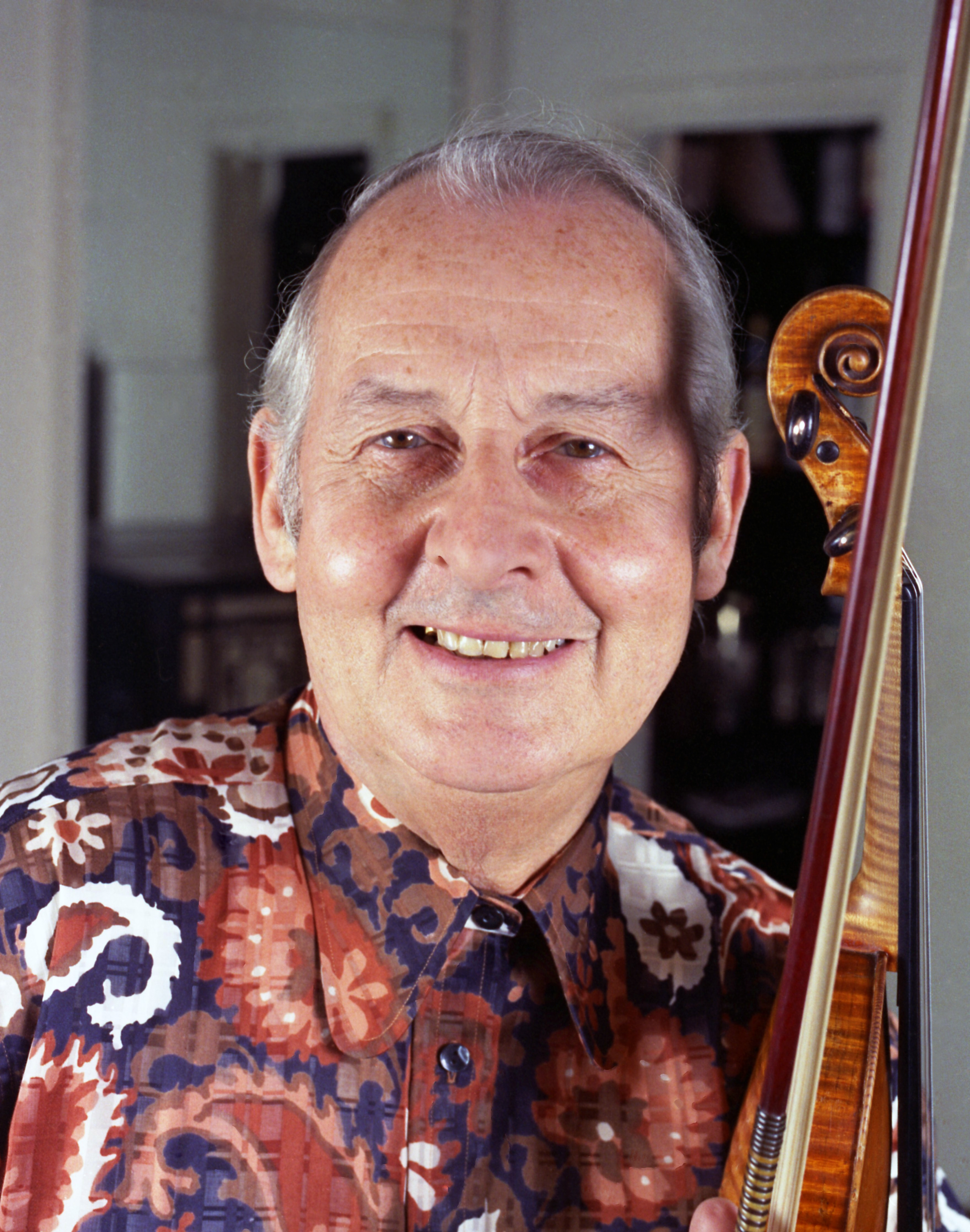
Stéphane Grappelli in London

When the war was over, Reinhardt came to England for a reunion with Grappelli. They recorded some titles in London with the "English Quintette" during January and February 1946 for EMI and Decca, using a rhythm section consisting of English guitarists Jack Llewelyn and Alan Hodgkiss together with the Jamaican jazz bassist Coleridge Goode. Grappelli chose to remain in England, while Reinhardt returned to Paris before undertaking an only moderately successful visit to the United States, where he performed in a new style using an amplified archtop guitar with Duke Ellington's orchestra. On Reinhardt's return, he and Grappelli reunited periodically for concerts on occasions when the latter was visiting Paris; however, the pre-war Quintette was never re-formed. The pair also briefly toured Italy, where they were supported by an Italian rhythm section of piano, bass and drums; the tour was documented, with around 50 tracks recorded for an Italian radio station, about half of which can be heard on the album Djangology (released in 2005). This was to be the last set of recordings featuring the pair, with Reinhardt moving into a more bebop/modern jazz idiom and playing with younger French musicians prior to his early death in 1953, aged only 43.

Throughout the 1950s, Grappelli made occasional visits to the recording studio, but the opportunities for a swing violinist of his generation were becoming limited; despite attempts to modernise his style, Grappelli was never particularly interested in the bebop style which was then fashionable in the jazz world. He made a brief filmed appearance in Paul Paviot's 1957 film Django Reinhardt, in which he plays "Minor Swing" alongside Joseph Reinhardt, Henri Crolla and others. In the 1960s, Grappelli made regular appearances on the BBC Light Programme, French Public Radio, and the pirate station Radio Luxembourg. In 1967, he returned to Paris to take up a regular engagement providing music for diners at the "Le Toit de Paris" restaurant in the Paris Hilton Hotel, a position he kept up until 1972, for it provided regular work plus accommodation at the hotel. He played in a standard "lounge jazz" format, accompanied by a pianist and drummer. Grappelli was making a living, but by now had very little impact on the jazz world.

In 1971, British chat-show host Michael Parkinson, a longtime jazz fan, came up with the idea of including Grappelli on his show Parkinson, where he would be joined by the classical violinist Yehudi Menuhin, with the two musicians performing a duet. Although Menuhin had no jazz training and a distinctly classical style of playing, the result went down very well with the British public. The pair went on to record three collaborative albums between 1972 and 1976, with Menuhin playing parts written out by Grappelli while the latter improvised in a classic jazz fashion. During their appearance on Parkinson's show, Menuhin played his prized Stradivari dating from 1714, while Grappelli revealed his instrument was made by Goffredo Cappa in 1695.

In 1973, British guitarist Diz Disley had the idea of prising Grappelli away from his "lounge jazz" format with piano players to play once again with the backing of acoustic guitars and double bass, re-creating a version of the "Hot Club" sound, but now with Grappelli as sole leader. Grappelli's reservations about returning to this format were dissipated following a rapturous reception for the "new" (old) format group at that year's Cambridge Folk Festival, after which he favoured the guitar-based trio (with double bass) for a series of increasingly successful concert tours around the globe. These tours would virtually occupy the remainder of Grappelli's life; away from the touring circuit, however, he also favoured numerous other instrumental combinations on record. Other guitarists in the British "Diz Disley Trio" providing his instrumental backing over the years included Denny Wright, Ike Isaacs, the Irish guitarist Louis Stewart, John Etheridge and Martin Taylor, while double bass was often provided by Dutchman Jack Sewing; in his later years, Grappelli also used a Parisian trio which included guitarist Marc Fosset and bassist Patrice Caratini.

In April 1973, Grappelli performed with great success during a week at "Jazz Power" in Milan, accompanied by Italian jazz musicians as guitarist Franco Cerri, bassist/arranger Pino Presti and drummer Tullio De Piscopo.

Grappelli played on hundreds of recordings, including sessions with Duke Ellington, jazz pianists Oscar Peterson, Michel Petrucciani and Claude Bolling, jazz violinists Svend Asmussen, Jean-Luc Ponty, and Stuff Smith, Indian classical violinist L. Subramaniam, vibraphonist Gary Burton, pop singer Paul Simon, mandolin player David Grisman, classical violinist Yehudi Menuhin, orchestral conductor André Previn, guitar player Bucky Pizzarelli, guitar player Joe Pass, cello player Yo Yo Ma, harmonica and jazz guitar player Toots Thielemans, jazz guitarist Henri Crolla, bassist Jon Burr and fiddler Mark O'Connor.

Grappelli recorded a solo for the title track of Pink Floyd's 1975 album Wish You Were Here. This was made almost inaudible in the mix, and so the violinist was not credited, according to Roger Waters, as it would be "a bit of an insult". A remastered version with Grappelli's contribution fully audible can be found on the 2011 editions of Wish You Were Here.

Grappelli composed the score for two French films: Going Places (Bertrand Blier, 1974) and May Fools (Louis Malle, 1990).

Grappelli made a cameo appearance in the 1978 film King of the Gypsies with mandolinist David Grisman. Three years later they performed in concert. He also made a 1975 cameo as a violinist in Little House on the Prairie season 2, episode 8. In the 1980s he gave several concerts with British cellist Julian Lloyd Webber. In 1997, Grappelli received the Grammy Lifetime Achievement Award. He is an inductee of the Down Beat Jazz Hall of Fame.

Grappelli continued touring up to the last year of his life; in 1997, although his health was by then poor, he toured the United Kingdom in March and then played concerts in Australia and New Zealand, giving his last public performance in Christchurch, New Zealand, before returning to Paris via Hong Kong. He made his final recording, four tracks with the classical violinist Iwao Furusawa, plus guitarist Marc Fosset and bassist Philippe Viret, in Paris in August 1996 (released as As Time Goes By: Stéphane Grappelli and Iwao Furusawa).

== Personal life and legacy ==
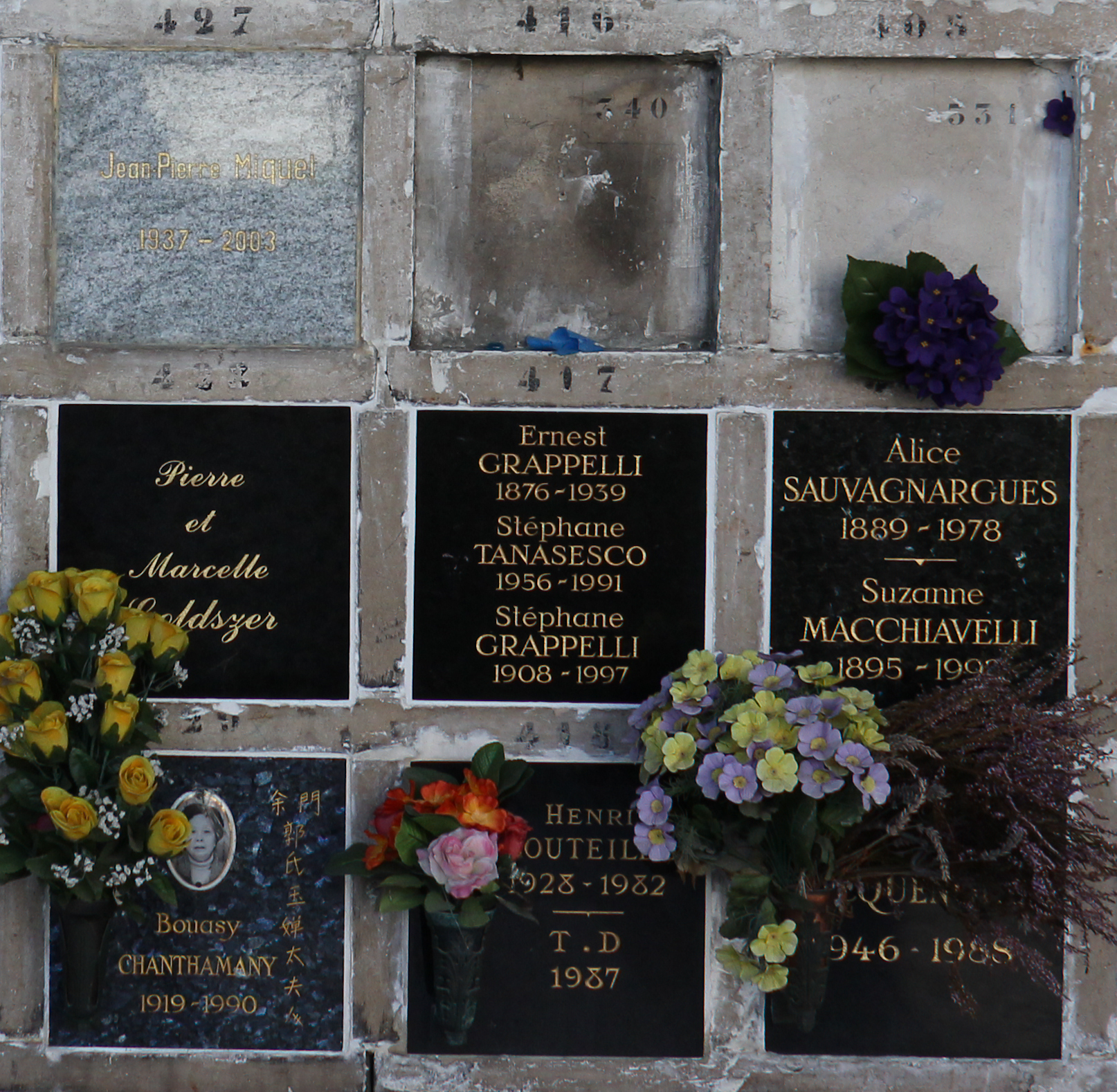
Grappelli's final resting place in crypt 417 of Division 87 (Columbarium) at Pere Lachaise Cemetery

In May 1935, Grappelli had a brief affair with Sylvia Caro that resulted in a daughter named Evelyne. Sylvia remained in Paris with her daughter for the duration of World War II. Father and daughter were reunited in 1946 when Evelyne travelled to London from France to stay with Grappelli for about a year. From 1952 to 1980, he shared much of his life with a female friend, Jean Barclay, for whom he felt a deep brotherly affection. Grappelli never married, however, and it is widely accepted that he was gay; in 1981 he met Joseph Oldenhove, who would be his companion until his death.

Grappelli died in Paris on 1 December 1997, suffering heart failure after a series of minor cerebral attacks. His funeral, on 5 December, took place at the Église Saint-Vincent-de-Paul, Paris, within sight of the entrance to the Lariboisière Hospital where he had been born 89 years earlier. His body was cremated and his ashes entombed in the city's Père Lachaise Cemetery.

He is the subject of the documentary Stéphane Grappelli – A Life in the Jazz Century.

== Discography ==
=== Albums ===
- Djangology: Django Reinhardt, the Gypsy Genius (1936 to 1940, released in 2005, Bluebird)
- Stéphane Grappelli and Django Reinhardt the Gold Edition (1934 to 1937, copyright 1998)
- Unique Piano Session Paris 1955 (1955, Jazz Anthology)
- Improvisations (Paris, 1956)
- Feeling + Finesse = Jazz (1962, Atlantic)
- Afternoon in Paris (1971, MPS)
- Manoir de Mes Reves (1972, Musidisc)
- Homage to Django (1972, released 1976, Classic Jazz)
- Stéphane Grappelli (1973, Pye)
- Black Lion at Montreux with the Black Lion All-stars (Black Lion), recorded 4 July 1973
- Just One of Those Things! (1973, Black Lion) Recorded live at the 1973 Montreux Jazz Festival with Marc Hemmeler (p), Jack Sewing (b), Daniel Humair (d)
- I Got Rhythm! (1974, Black Lion) with The Hot Club of London (Diz Disley/Denny Wright/Len Skeat), recorded at the Queen Elizabeth Hall, London, 5 November 1973
- The Talk of the Town (1975, Black Lion) with Alan Clare
- Satin Doll (1975, Vanguard)
- Parisian Thoroughfare with Roland Hanna/Mel Lewis/George Mraz (1975, Arista/Freedom)
- The Rock Peter and the Wolf (1976, RSO)
- +Cordes (1977, Musidisc)
- Steph 'n' Us (1977, Cherry Pie) with Don Burrows & George Golla – AUS #38
- Live at Carnegie Hall (1978, Signature)
- Uptown Dance (1978, Columbia)
- Young Django (1979, MPS) with Philip Catherine/Larry Coryell/Niels-Henning Ørsted Pedersen
- Stéphane Grappelli '80 (1980, Happy Bird)
- Tivoli Gardens, Copenhagen, Denmark (Pablo Live, 1980)
- Live at Carnegie Hall (1983, Dr Jazz) with Diz Disley/John Etheridge/Brian Torff
- Vintage 1981 (1981, Concord)
- Just One of Those Things (1984, EMI)
- Grappelli Plays George Gershwin (1984, Musidisc)
- Fascinating Rhythm (1986, Jazz Life)
- Live in San Francisco (1986, Blackhawk)
- Classic Sessions: Stéphane Grappelli with Phil Woods and Louie Bellson (1987, RTV)
- Stéphane Grappelli Plays Jerome Kern (1987, GRP)
- The Intimate Grappelli (1988, Jazz Life)
- How Can You Miss with Louie Bellson and Phil Woods (1989, Rushmore)
- Jazz 'Round Midnight (1989, Verve)
- My Other Love (1991, Colombia) – Grappelli performs on solo piano
- Stéphane Grappelli in Tokyo (1991, A&M)
- Bach to the Beatles (1991, Academy Sound)
- Live 1992 (1992, Verve)
- 85 and Still Swinging (1993, Angel)
- Live at the Blue Note (1996, Telarc)
- Crazy Rhythm (1996/2000, Pulse)
- Parisian Thoroughfare (1997, Laserlight)

=== Collaborations ===
- Stéphane Grappelli and Adelaide Hall, 1939, BBC Studios, London, "You're Blasé" by Adelaide Hall with Stéphane Grappelli and Arthur Young and his Swingtette
- Stéphane Grappelli/Django Reinhardt/Bill Coleman: Bill Coleman with Django and Stéphane Grappelli 1936 to 1938 (released 1985, DRG)
- Stéphane Grappelli/Stuff Smith/Svend Asmussen/Jean-Luc Ponty: Violin Summit (1967, Polygram)
- Stéphane Grappelli and Hubert Clavecin: Dansez Sur Vos Souvenirs (1978, Musidisc)
- Stéphane Grappelli and Barney Kessel: Remember Django (1969, Black Lion)
- Stéphane Grappelli and Gary Burton: Paris Encounter (1969, Atlantic)
- Stéphane Grappelli and Joe Venuti: Venupelli Blues (1970, BYG Records)
- Stéphane Grappelli and Barney Kessel: Limehouse Blues (1972, Black Lion)
- Stéphane Grappelli and Gary Burton: Paris Encounter (1972, Atlantic)
- Stéphane Grappelli and Paul Simon: Hobo's Blues (1972, Columbia)
- Oscar Peterson – Stéphane Grappelli Quartet Vol. 1 (1973, America Records)
- Stéphane Grappelli and Yehudi Menuhin: Jealousy (1973, EMI)
- Stéphane Grappelli and Alan Clare: Stardust (1973, Black Lion)
- Stéphane Grappelli and Baden Powell: La Grande Reunion (1974, Accord)
- Stéphane Grappelli and The Diz Disley Trio: Violinspiration (1975, MPS)
- Stéphane Grappelli and Yehudi Menuhin: Fascinating Rhythm: Music by George Gershwin, Jerome Kern, Cole Porter (1975, EMI)
- Stéphane Grappelli and Slam Stewart: Steff and Slam (1975, Black and Blues)
- Stéphane Grappelli and Bill Coleman: Stéphane Grappelli/Bill Coleman (1976, Classic Jazz [CJ 24], recorded 1973)
- Stéphane Grappelli and Pink Floyd: Wish You Were Here 50(2025, Pink Floyd Music Limited, recorded 1973)
- Stéphane Grappelli and Earl Hines: Stéphane Grappelli meets Earl Hines (1977, Black Lion)
- Stéphane Grappelli and The George Shearing Trio: The Reunion (1977, MPS)
- Stéphane Grappelli and Yehudi Menuhin: Tea for Two (1978, EMI)
- Stéphane Grappelli and Bucky Pizzarelli: Duet (1979, Ahead)
- Stéphane Grappelli and David Grisman: Live at Berklee (recorded in Boston, Massachusetts, 20 September 1979)
- Stéphane Grappelli and Martial Solal: Happy Reunion (1980, MPO)
- Stéphane Grappelli and Yehudi Menuhin: Strictly for the Birds (1980, Angel Records)
- Stéphane Grappelli and David Grisman: Live (1981, Warner Bros.)
- Oscar Peterson/Stéphane Grappelli/Joe Pass/Mickey Roker/Niels-Henning Ørsted Pedersen: Skol (1982, recorded in Tivoli Concert Hall, Copenhagen, Denmark, 6 July 1979)
- Stéphane Grappelli with Marc Fosset: Stephanova (1983, Concord Jazz)
- Stéphane Grappelli with L. Subramaniam: Conversations (1984, Milestone)
- Stéphane Grappelli and Toots Thielemans: Bringing it Together (1984, Cymekob)
- Stéphane Grappelli and Martin Taylor: We've Got the World on a String (1984, EMI)
- Stéphane Grappelli and Stuff Smith: Violins No End (1984, Pablo)
- Stéphane Grappelli and Helen Merrill (1986, Music Makers)
- Stéphane Grappelli and Vassar Clements: Together at Last (1987, Flying Fish)
- Stéphane Grappelli and Yehudi Menuhin: Menuhin and Grappelli Play Berlin, Kern, Porter and Rodgers & Hart (1988, EMI)
- Stéphane Grappelli and Jean-Luc Ponty: Violin Summit (1989, Jazz Life)
- Stéphane Grappelli and Jean-Luc Ponty: Compact Jazz (1988, MPS)
- Stéphane Grappelli and Martial Solal: Olympia 1988 (1988, Atlantic)
- Stéphane Grappelli and Joe Venuti: Best of Jazz Violins (1989, LRC)
- Stéphane Grappelli and Yo Yo Ma: Anything Goes: Stéphane Grappelli & Yo-Yo Ma Play (Mostly) Cole Porter (1989, CBS)
- Stéphane Grappelli and McCoy Tyner: One on One (1990, Milestone)
- Stéphane Grappelli and L. Subramaniam: Conversations (1984, Milestone)
- Stéphane Grappelli and Claude Bolling: First Class (1992, Milan)
- Stéphane Grappelli and Michel Legrand: Legrand Grappelli (1992, Verve)
- Stéphane Grappelli and Martin Taylor: Réunion (1993, Linn)
- Capelino featuring Stéphane Grappelli: La Copine (1993, Munich Records)
- The Rosenberg Trio featuring Stéphane Grappelli, Jan Akkerman & Frits Landesbergen: Caravan (1994, Polydor BV)
- Stéphane Grappelli and Michel Petrucciani: Flamingo (1996, Dreyfus)
- Stéphane Grappelli/Carl Hession/Frankie Gavin/Marc Fosset: Frankie Gavin 2003–2004 Collection/The Grappelli Era (2003)

=== DVD ===
- Stéphane Grappelli in Concert with guest Frankie Gavin (1993)

=== Film scores ===
- Les valseuses (Going Places) (1974)
- Milou en mai (May Fools) (1990)
