= Jazzman (magazine) =

French jazz magazine, 1992–2009

Jazzman was a French magazine on the subject of jazz and jazz performance. Founded in October 1992, it was merged with Jazz Magazine in September 2009 in response to the worldwide economic downturn and the general loss of revenue among music magazines. It was advertised as "the magazine for all Jazz".

Jazzman began as a free supplement in Le Monde de la musique; it published its first independent number in March 1995.
