= Origin Records =

American jazz and classical record label

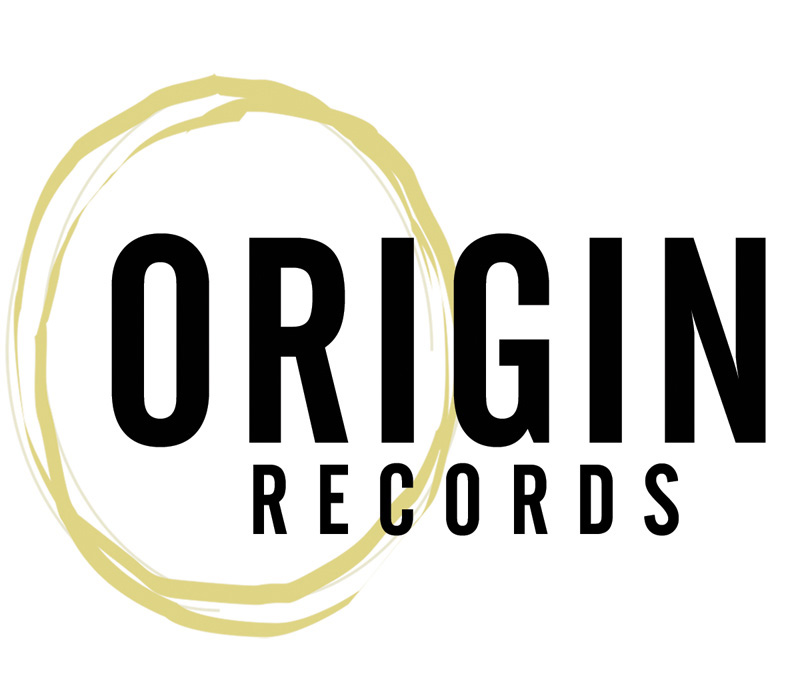
- Founded: 1997
- Founder: John Bishop
- Status: active
- Distributors: City Hall Records, NewArts International
- Genre: Jazz, classical
- Country of origin: U.S.
- Location: Seattle, Washington
- Official website: originarts.com

Origin Records is a jazz and classical music record label founded by drummer John Bishop in 1997. With the help of drummer Matt Jorgensen, Origin expanded its roster of musicians and added the labels OA2 and Origin Classical.

== History ==
Founded in 1997 in Seattle, Washington by John Bishop, with technical help from his former student, New York drummer Matt Jorgensen, the label debuted on the web in 1998. After Jorgensen moved back to Seattle in 2002, the label quickly grew regional, national, and then international.

Origin Records added its sister jazz labels, OA2 Records, in June 2002 and a classical imprint, Origin Classical, in April 2008. In 2009, Origin was named Label of the Year by JazzWeek.

Since 2003, Origin has hosted Seattle's annual Ballard Jazz Festival. The festival was named "Northwest Concert of the Year" by Earshot Jazz magazine in 2005 and has featured Sonny Fortune, Chano Dominguez, Gary Bartz, Lee Konitz with the Hal Galper Trio, Matt Wilson, Mike Stern, Bobby Broom, Eric Alexander, the Brian Blade Fellowship, and Joe Locke.

== Records ==
The Origin/OA2 catalog represents over 900 recordings from over 400 artists, and releases 30-40 new albums a year.

=== Origin Records ===
Cat. #	Artist	Album	Year
82964	Charged Particles With Randy Brecker & Tod Dickow	Celebrating Michael Brecker: Live at the Bach Dancing & Dynamite Society	2026
82963	Jeff Johnson	Meanwhile...	2026
82962	David Friesen & John Stowell	Interplay Variations	2026
82961	Ron Vincent	Ray's Hat Trick	2026
82960	Clay Giberson	Moment's Notice	2026
82959	Mike Dana Jazz Orchestra	Farther (Still)	2026
82958	Janis Siegel	The Art of Vocalese	2026
82957	Andrew Kim	Lineage	2026
82956	Bob Nell & Michael Bisio Trios	We Are Here	2026
82955	Michael Dease Big Band	Return Trajectory	2026
82954	Brad Goode Quintet feat. Ernie Watts	Live Your Dream: Live at North Street Cabaret	2026
82953	Ben Patterson	Stretch	2026
82952	Gabriel Espinosa	The Brazilian Project	2026
82951	Dawn Clement	Dear Ms. Dearie	2026
82950	Jared Hall	Hometown	2026
82949	Abate Berihun & The Addis Ken Project	Addis Ken	2026
82948	Barry Greene	Giants	2026
82947	Harvie S	Bright Dawn	2026
82946	Chenxi Pan	This Very Moment	2026
82945	Anthony Branker & Other Ways of Knowing	Manifestations of a Diasporic Groove & Spirit	2026
82944	Dave Slonaker Big Band	Shifty Paradigms	2026
82943	Mattias Svensson	Embrace	2026
82942	Paul Ricci	The Path	2026
82941	Michael Dease	MSU Jazz Trombones: Spartan Strong	2026
82940	Eddie Allen's Push	The Rhythm	2026
82939	Carl Schultz	The Road to Trantor	2025
82938	Bobby Rozario	Healer	2025
82937	Paul Marinaro	Mood Ellington	2025
82936	John Gunther	Painting the Dream	2025
82935	Affinity Trio	New Outlook	2025
82934	Maja Jaku	Blessed & Bewitched	2025
82933	Jovino Santos Neto Quarteto	Mais Que Tudo: Live at Kerry Hall 1995	2025
82932	Milan Verbist	Time Change	2025
82931	Shawn Purcell	Oblivity	2025
82930	Marc Seales	People & Places	2025
82929	Mike Pope	The Parts You Keep	2025
82928	Zurhub	Countryside Motorways	2025
82927	Ben Thomas Tango Project	The Hat with the Grin and the Chuckle	2025
82926	Dawn Clement	Delight	2025
82924	Michael Dease	City Life: Music of Gregg Hill	2025
82923	Alon Farber Hagiga	Dreams I Dream	2025
82922	Michael Waldrop	Native Son	2025
82921	Jordan VanHemert	Survival of the Fittest	2025
82920	James Moody	80 Years Young: Live at the Blue Note, March 26, 2005	2025
82919	Nancy Kelly	Be Cool	2025
82918	Charlie Ballantine	East by Midwest	2025
82917	José Luiz Martins	Odyssey Mixtape	2025
82915	Dave Hanson	Blues Sky	2025
82914	Ben Patterson Jazz Orchestra	Mad Scientist Music	2025
82913	Nnenna Freelon	Beneath the Skin	2025
82912	Rodney Whitaker	Mosaic: The Music of Gregg Hill	2025
82911	Nanami Haruta	The Vibe	2025
82910	Peter Erskine & The JAM Music Lab All-Stars	Vienna to Hollywood: Impressions of E.W. Korngold & Max Steiner	2025
82909	Brad Goode	Polytonal Big Band: The Snake Charmer	2025
82908	David Friesen	A Light Shining Through	2024
82907	Western Jazz Collective	Dark Journey: The Music of Andrew Rathbun	2024
82906	Michael Dease	Found in Space: The Music of Gregg Hill	2024
82905	Delia Fischer	Delia Fischer: Beyond Bossa	2024
82904	Benjamin Boone	Confluence: The Ireland Sessions	2024
82903	David Weiss Sextet	Auteur	2024
82902	Eric Jacobson	Heading Home	2024
82901	Piet Verbist	Flamenco Jazz Summit: El Mar Empieza Aqui	2024
82900	Robby Ameen	Live at the Poster Museum	2024
82898	Jared Hall	Influences	2024
82897	Clarence Penn	Behind the Voice	2024
82896	Anthony Branker & Imagine	Songs My Mom Liked	2024
82895	Karrin Allyson	A Kiss for Brazil	2024
82894	Ben Patterson Jazz Orchestra	Groove Junkies	2024
82893	Chuck Owen & Resurgence	Magic Light	2024
82892	Jordan VanHemert	Deep in the Soil	2024
82891	Geoff Stradling & The Stradband	Nimble Digits	2024
82890	Martin Budde	Back Burner	2024
82889	Last Word Quintet	Falling to Earth	2024
82888	David Friesen	This Light Has No Darkness, Volume 1	2024
82887	Alon Farber Hagiga	The Magician: Live in Jerusalem	2024
82886	Bill Anschell	Improbable Solutions	2024
82885	Peter Erskine	Bernstein in Vienna	2024
82884	Arthur Kell Speculation Quartet	Live at Lunatico	2023
82883	John Bishop	Antwerp	2023
82882	Affinity Trio	Hindsight	2023
82881	Gabriel Guerrero & Quantum	Equilibrio	2023
82880	Maddie Vogler	While We Have Time	2023
82879	Benjamin Boone	Caught in the Rhythm	2023
82878	John La Barbera Big Band	Grooveyard	2023
82877	Matt Otto	Umbra	2023
82876	Ascent	Spirit Songs	2023
82875	Bobby Rozario	Spellbound	2023
82874	Keigo Hirakawa	Pixel	2023
82873	Ray Vega & Thomas Marriott	East West Trumpet Summit: Coast to Coast	2023
82872	Michael Bisio & Timothy Hill	Inside Voice / Outside Voice	2023
82871	Jeff Johnson	My Heart	2023
82870	Les DeMerle	Once in a Lifetime	2023
82869	Rich Thompson	Who Do You Have to Know?	2023
82868	Michael Dease	The Other Shoe: The Music of Gregg Hill	2023
82867	Manzanita Quintet	Osmosis	2023
82866	Anthony Branker & Imagine	What Place Can Be for Us? - A Suite in Ten Mo	2023
82865	Brad Goode	The Unknown	2023
82864	Metropolitan Jazz Octet	The Bowie Project	2023
82863	Mimi Fox Organ Trio	One for Wes	2023
82862	Scenes	Variable Clouds: Live at the Earshot Jazz Festival	2022
82861	John Scofield	Ivory Forest Redux	2022
82860	Rodney Whitaker	Oasis: The Music of Gregg Hill	2022
82859	Tito Carrillo	Urbanessence	2022
82858	Eric Jacobson	Discover	2022
82857	Lincoln Goines	The Art of the Bass Choir	2022
82856	Shawn Purcell	180	2022
82855	Bruce Barth Trio	Dedication	2022
82854	Chris Walden / Kurt Elling	Missa Iubileum Aureum: Golden Jubilee Jazz Ma	2022
82853	Ben Patterson	The Way of the Groove	2022
82852	Roberta Brenza	It's My Turn to Color Now	2022
82851	Dave Slonaker Big Band	Convergency	2022
82850	Meridian Odyssey	Earthshine	2022
82849	Dmitri Matheny	Cascadia	2022
82848	Hugo Fernandez	Ozean	2022
82847	Andrea Brachfeld	Evolution	2022
82846	Cathy Segal-Garcia & Phillip Strange	Live in Japan	2022
82845	Michael Orenstein	Aperture	2022
82844	Jordan VanHemert	Nomad	2022
82843	Hal Galper Trio	Invitation to Openness: Live at Big Twig	2022
82842	Xose Miguelez	Contradictio	2022
82841	John Stowell / Dave Glenn & The Hawcaptak Qua	Violin Memory	2022
82840	Jared Sims	Against All Odds	2022
82839	Darren Johnston	Life in Time	2022
82838	Piet Verbist	Secret Exit to Another Dimension	2022
82837	Doug Scarborough	The Color of Angels	2022
82836	Ben Thomas Tango Project	Eternal Aporia	2022
82835	Ben Black	Mystery & Wonder	2021
82834	Jim Knapp Orchestra	It's Not Business, It's Personal	2021
82833	David Friesen	Day of Rest	2021
82832	John Moulder	Metamorphosis	2021
82831	Mark Zaleski Band	Our Time: Reimagining Dave Brubeck	2021
82830	Cathy Segal-Garcia	Social Anthems, Volume 1	2021
82829	Alon Farber Hagiga	Reflecting on Freedom	2021
82828	Jared Hall	Seen on the Scene	2021
82827	Steve Million	What I Meant to Say	2021
82826	Scott Reeves	The Alchemist	2021
82825	Sean Michael Giddings	Red Willow	2021
82824	Carlos Vega	Art of the Messenger	2021
82823	Greg Germann	Tales of Time	2021
82822	Nnenna Freelon	Time Traveler	2021
82821	Brent Jensen	More Sounds of a Dry Martini	2021
82820	David Friesen & Bob Ravenscroft	Passage	2021
82819	Rodney Whitaker	Outrospection: The Music of Gregg Hill	2021
82818	Amit Friedman	Unconditional Love	2021
82817	Ben Patterson	Push the Limits	2021
82816	Les DeMerle Band	Hot Night in Venice	2021
82815	John Stowell & Dan Dean	Rain Painting	2021
82814	Rodney Whitaker	Cranbrook Christmas Jazz	2021
82813	Grete Skarpeid	Beyond Other Stories	2021
82812	Meridian Odyssey	Second Wave	2021
82811	Greg Yasinitsky	Yazz Band: New Normal	2021
82810	Hal Galper Quintet	Live at the Berlin Philharmonic, 1977	2021
82809	David Friesen	Testimony	2020
82808	Benjamin Boone	The Poets Are Gathering	2020
82807	Scenes	Trapeze	2020
82806	Joachim Mencel	Brooklyn Eye	2020
82805	Trio Linguae	Signals	2020
82804	Ryan Cohan	Originations	2020
82803	Alain Mallet	Mutt Slang II: A Wake of Sorrows Engulfed in Rage	2020
82802	Ted Moore Trio	The Natural Order of Things	2020
82801	Robby Ameen	Diluvio	2020
82800	Benjamin Boone with The Ghana Jazz Collective	Joy	2020
82797	Thomas Marriott	Trumpet Ship	2020
82796	Christopher Icasiano	Provinces	2020
82795	Andrea Brachfeld	Brazilian Whispers	2020
82794	Purna Loka Ensemble	Metaraga	2020
82793	Hal Galper Trio	The Zone: Live at the Yardbird Suite	201 zone
82792	David Friesen Circle 3 Trio	Interaction	2019
82791	Michael Zilber	East West: Music for Big Bands	2019
82790	Kiki Valera	Vivencias en Clave Cubana	2019
82789	Rodney Whitaker	All Too Soon: The Music of Duke Ellington	2019
82788	Dan McCarthy	City Abstract	2019
82787	Peterson-Kohler Collective	Winter Colors	2019
82786	Oscar Hernandez & Alma Libre	Love the Moment	2019
82785	Corey Christiansen	La Proxima	2019
82784	New York Voices	Reminiscing in Tempo	2019
82783	Xavier LeCouturier	Carrier	2019
82782	Greta Matassa	Portrait	2019
82781	Marlene Rosenberg	MLK Convergence	2019
82780	Rodney Whitaker	Common Ground: The Music of Gregg Hill	2019
82779	Dann Zinn	Day of Reckoning	2019
82778	Xose Miguelez	Ontology	2019
82777	Laurie Antonioli	The Constant Passage of Time	2019
82776	Paul Tynan	Quartet	2019
82775	Dan McCarthy	Epoch	2019
82774	Brittany Anjou	Enamigo Reciprokataj	2019
82773	Mimi Fox	This Bird Still Flies	2019
82772	Benjamin Boone & Philip Levine	The Poetry of Jazz, Volume 2	2019
82771	May Okita	Art of Life	2019
82770	Chuck Deardorf	Perception	2019
82769	Piet Verbist	Suite Reunion	2018
82768	David Friesen	My Faith, My Life	2018
82767	Jay Thomas with the Oliver Groenewald Newnet	I Always Knew	2018
82766	Joe Locke	Subtle Disguise	2018
82765	Thomas Marriott	Romance Language	2018
82764	Brad Goode Quintet	That's Right!	2018
82763	Randy Halberstadt	Open Heart	2018
82762	John Moulder	Decade: Memoirs	2018
82760	Bad Luck	Four	2018
82759	Kobie Watkins Grouptet	Movement	2018
82758	Bongwool Lee	My Singing Fingers	2018
82757	Bill Anschell	Shifting Standards	2018
82756	Hans Teuber & Jeff Johnson	Deuce	2018
82755	Andrew Rathbun Large Ensemble	Atwood Suites	2018
82754	Philip Levine	The Poetry of Jazz	2018
82753	John Stowell	Petite Fleur: The Music of Sidney Bechet	2018
82752	Scott Reeves Jazz Orchestra	Without a Trace	2018
82751	Hal Galper Quartet	Cubist	2018
82750	Sergio Galvao, Lupa Santiago, Cl Landais	2x2	2018
82749	Dawn Clement	Tandem	2018
82748	Margo Rey	The Roots of Rey, Despacito Margo	2018
82747	Michael Waldrop	Origin Suite	2018
82746	Ulf Bandgren Quartet	Night Visitor	2017
82745	Eva Cortes	Crossing Borders	2017
82744	David Friesen	Structures	2017
82743	Corey Christiansen	Dusk	2017
82742	Emi Meyer	Monochrome	2017
82741	Josh Nelson	The Sky Remains	2017
82740	Florian Hoefner	Coldwater Stories	2017
82739	Triocity	I Believe in You	2017
82738	Hal Galper & The Youngbloods	Live at the COTA Jazz Festival	2017
82737	Carlos Vega	Bird's Up	2017
82736	Scenes	Destinations	2017
82735	Zem Audu	Spirits	2017
82734	John McLean / Clark Sommers Band	Parts Unknown	2017
82733	Tom Rizzo	Day and Night	2017
82732	Sarah Partridge	Bright Lights & Promises	2017
82731	Matt Otto with Ensemble Iberica	Iberica	2017
82730	Oscar Hernandez & Alma Libre	The Art of Latin Jazz	2017
82729	Michael Zilber	Originals for the Originals	2017
82728	Bill Anschell	Rumbler	2017
82726	Mamutrio	Primal Existence	2016
82725	Tom Collier	Impulsive Illuminations	2016
82724	Clay Giberson	Pastures	2016
82723	David Friesen Circle 3 Trio	Triple Exposure	2016
82722	John Moulder	Earthborn Tales of Soul and Spirit	2016
82721	Jason Hainsworth	Third Ward Stories	2016
82720	Tim Davies Big Band	The Expensive Train Set	2016
82719	Anthony Branker	Beauty Within	2016
82718	Allison Adams Tucker	Wanderlust	2016
82717	John Stowell	Basement Blues	2016
82716	Joonsam	A Door	2016
82715	Corey Christiansen	Factory Girl	2016
82714	Dan Cray	Outside In	2016
82713	Joel Miller	Dream Cassette	2016
82712	The Dynamic Les DeMerle Band	Comin' Home Baby	2016
82711	Marcos Varela	San Ygnacio	2016
82710	Scott Reeves	Portraits and Places	2016
82709	Ark Ovrutski Quintet	Intersection	2016
82708	Carlos Vega	Bird's Ticket	2016
82707	Ray Vega	Return of the East-West Trumpet Summit	2016
82706	Florian Hoefner	Luminosity	2016
82705	Roxy Coss	Restless Idealism	2016
82704	David Friesen	Bactrian	2015
82703	Tom Collier	Across the Bridge	2015
82702	Emma Larsson	Sing to the Sky	2015
82701	Geof Bradfield Quintet	Our Roots	2015
82700	Ben Paterson	For Once in My Life	2015
82699	John Wocjiechowski	Focus	2015
82698	Laurie Antonioli	Varuna	2015
82697	Tad Britton	Cicada	2015
82696	Clay Giberson	Minga Minga	2015
82695	Nick Finzer	The Chase	2015
82694	Jack Perla	Enormous Changes	2015
82693	Lorin Cohen	Home	2015
82692	Hugo Fernandez	Cosmogram	2015
82691	Tom Collier	Alone in the Studio	2015
82690	Michael Waldrop Big Band	Time Within Itself	2015
82689	Sarah Partridge	I Never Thought I'd Be Here	2015
82688	Lucas Pino	No Net Nonet	2015
82687	Josh Nelson	Exploring Mars	2015
82686	Scott Hesse Trio	The Stillness of Motion	2015
82685	The H2 Big Band	It Could Happen	2015
82684	John Stowell & Michael Zilber	Live Beauty	2015
82683	Chad McCullough & Bram Weijters	Abstract Quantities	2015
82682	Gene Argel	Luminescent	2015
82681	George Colligan	Risky Notion	2015
82680	Marc Seales	American Songs Volume 3	2015
82679	Piet Verbist	Zygomatik	2014
82678	Jim Norton Collective	Time Remembered - Compositions of Bill Evans	2014
82677	David Friesen / Circle 3 Trio	Where the Light Falls	2014
82676	The Spin Quartet	In Circles	2014
82675	Brad Goode Quintet	Montezuma	2014
82674	Clarence Penn & Penn Station	Monk - The Lost Files	2014
82673	Ryan Shultz Quintet	Hair Dryers	2014
82672	Thomas Marriott	Urban Folklore	2014
82671	Jerry Heldman	Revelation(s)	2014
82670	Hal Galper Trio	O's Time	2014
82669	Chris Walden Big Band	Full-On	2014
82668	Dee Daniels	Intimate Conversations	2014
82667	Bobby Broom	My Shining Hour	2014
82666	Laurie Antonioli	Songs of Shadow, Songs of Light: The Music of	2014
82665	Collier & Dean	Sleek Buick	2014
82664	Todd Bishop	Travelogue	2014
82663	Anthony Branker & Word Play	The Forward (Towards Equality) Suite	2014
82662	Peter Lerner	Continuation	2014
82661	Bobby Selvaggio	Short Stories	2014
82660	Jessica Williams	With Love	2014
82659	Dominic J. Marshall Trio	Spirit Speech	2014
82658	Marc Seales	American Songs, Vol 2: Blues...and Jazz	2014
82657	Scenes	…But Not Heard	2014
82656	Brian Gephart	Standing on Two Feet	2013
82655	John Stowell & Dave Liebman	Blue Rose	2013
82654	George Colligan	The Endless Mysteries	2013
82653	Jon Hamar	Idyl Wild	2013
82652	Aaron Germain	Chance	2013
82651	Dave Slonaker Big Band	Intrada	2013
82650	Tim Horner	The Head of the Circle	2013
82649	Ted Brancato	The Next Step	2013
82648	Chicago Jazz Orchestra with Cyrille Aimee	Burstin' Out!	2013
82647	Anne Drummond	Revolving	2013
82646	Clark Sommers Ba(sh)	Clark Sommers Ba(sh)	2013
82645	Scott Neumann Neu3 Trio	Blessed	2013
82644	Dynamic Les DeMerle Band	Feelin' Good	2013
82643	Alan Jones & François Théberge	Another View	2013
82642	Various Artists	WDCB Loves Chicago Jazz, Vol. One	2013
82641	Diego Barber & Hugo Cipres	411	2013
82640	Corey Christiansen	Lone Prairie	2013
82639	Clipper Anderson	Ballad of the Sad Young Men	2013
82638	Marc Bernstein & Good People	Hymn for Life	2013
82637	Geof Bradfield	Melba!	2013
82636	Rich Thompson	Less Is More	2013
82635	Anthony Branker & Word Play	Uppity	2013
82634	Brad Goode	Chicago Red	2013
82632	Dick Reynolds	Music & Friends	2013
82631	Mimi Fox	Standards, Old and New	2013
82630	Inbar Fridman	Time Quartet Project	2013
82629	Jeff Johnson	Suitcase	2012
82628	Hal Galper Trio	Airegin Revisited	2012
82627	Anthony Branker & Ascent	Together	2012
82626	Chad McCullough & Bram Weijters	Urban Nightingale	2012
82625	Jaiman Crunk	Encounters	2012
82624	Pharez Whitted	For the People	2012
82623	Jon Hamar	Hymn	2012
82622	Hood Smoke	Laid Up in Ordinary	2012
82621	Brent Jensen/Bill Anschell/Chris Symer	Blueprints	2012
82620	John Stowell & Ulf Bandgren	Throop	2012
82619	Jessica Williams	Songs of Earth	2012
82618	Richard Sussman	Continuum	2012
82617	Bobby Broom	Upper West Side Story	2012
82616	Rich Thompson Trio	Generations	2012
82615	Human Spirit	Dialogue	2012
82614	Amit Friedman Sextet	Sunrise	2012
82613	Joel Miller	Swim	2012
82612	Todd Bishop	Little Played Little Bird	2012
82611	Dudley Owens/Aaron Wright Band	People Calling	2012
82610	Twopool	Traffic Bins	2012
82609	Dan Cray	Meridies	2012
82608	Upper Left Trio	Ulternative	2012
82607	Piet Verbist	Zygomatik	2012
82606	John Moulder	The Eleventh Hour	2012
82605	Clipper Anderson	The Road Home	2012
82604	Marlene Rosenberg	Bassprint	2012
82603	Tito Carrillo	Opening Statement	2011
82602	Hal Galper Trio	Trip the Light Fantastic	2011
82601	Lola Regenthal	With You	2011
82600	Wellstone Conspiracy	Humble Origins	2011
82599	Ira Sullivan & Stu Katz	A Family Affair - Live at Joe Segal’s Jazz Showcase	2011
82598	The Dynamic Les DeMerle Band	Gypsy Rendezvous, Vol. 2	2011
82597	Anthony Branker & Word Play	Dialogic	2011
82596	Sam Yahel	From Sun to Sun	2011
82595	Deep Blue Organ Trio	Wonderful!	2011
82594	Scenes	Silent Photographer	2011
82593	Asguests	Universal Mind	2011
82592	John Stowell / Michael Zilber Quartet	Shot Through with Beauty	2011
82591	Storms/Nocturnes - Joe Locke/Geoff Keezer/Tim Garland	Via	2011
82590	Bill Anschell	Figments	2011
82589	Jessica Williams	Freedom Trane	2011
82588	Thomas Marriott	Human Spirit	2011
82587	Chuck Deardorf	Transparence	2011
82586	R/E/D/S	Sign of Four	2011
82585	Cuong Vu 4-Tet	Leaps of Faith	2011
82584	Chad McCullough & Bram Weijters	Imaginary Sketches	2011
82583	Qed	Yet What Is Any Ocean…	2011
82582	Matija Dedic Trio	MD in NYC	2011
82581	Tom Luer	Project Popular	2011
82580	Francis Coletta & Jonas Tauber	Port Said Street	2011
82579	Anthony Branker & Ascent	Dance Music	2010
82578	Greta Matassa & Clipper Anderson	And to All a Good Night	2010
82577	Thomas Marriott	Constraints & Liberations	2010
82576	Chad McCullough & Michal Vaňouček	The Sky Cries	2010
82575	Richard Cole	Inner Mission	2010
82574	Doug Beavers 9	Two Shades of Nude	2010
82573	Alison Ruble	Ashland	2010
82572	Geof Bradfield	African Flowers	2010
82571	Randy Halberstadt	Flash Point	2010
82570	Tom Rizzo	Imaginary Numbers	2010
82569	Hadley Caliman & Pete Christlieb	Reunion	2010
82568	Matt Jorgensen	Tattooed by Passion: Music Inspired by the Paintings Dale Chisman	2010
82567	Bruce Williamson	Standard Transmission	2010
82566	Jessica Williams	Touch	2010
82565	Seattle Repertory Jazz Orchestra	Jimmy Heath: Endless Search	2010
82564	Ziggurat Quartet	Calculated Gestures	2010
82563	Richard Sussman Quintet	Live at Sweet Rhythm	2010
82562	Corey Christiansen	Outlaw Tractor	2010
82561	Ray Vega & Thomas Marriott	East-West Trumpet Summit	2010
82560	Wellstone Conspiracy	Motives	2010
82559	Peter Epstein & Idee Fixe	Abstract Realism	2010
82558	Speak	Speak	2010
82557	Hal Galper	E Pluribus Unum	2010
82556	Bob Sneider & Paul Hofmann	Serve and Volley	2010
82555	Scenes	Rinnova	2010
82554	Eea	The Dark	2010
82553	Aaron Immanuel Wright	Eleven Daughters	2010
82552	Dan Dean	251	2010
82551	Hadley Caliman	Straight Ahead	2010
82550	Curt Berg	At Stagg Street Studio	2009
82549	Phil Kelly	Ballet of the Bouncing Beagles	2009
82548	Matt Vashlishan	No Such Thing	2009
82547	Dana Hall	Into the Light	2009
82546	John Moulder	Bifrost	2009
82545	Marius Nordal	Boomer Jazz	2009
82544	Les DeMerle	Gypsy Rendezvous, Vol. 1	2009
82543	Bug	The Gadfly	2009
82542	Jessica Williams	The Art of the Piano	2009
82541	Courtney Fortune	Speak Love	2009
82540	Diverse	Diverse	2009
82538	Jon Alberts / Jeff Johnson / Tad Britton	Apothecary	2009
82537	Kevin Deitz	Skylines	2009
82536	Dave Glenn	National Pastime	2009
82535	Chad McCullough	Dark Wood, Dark Water	2009
82534	Bobby Broom	Bobby Broom Plays for Monk	2009
82533	Brent Jensen	We Couldn't Agree More	2009
82532	Kobie Watkins	Involved	2009
82531	Tim Davies Big Band	Dialmentia	2009
82530	Todd Bishop Pop Art 4	69 Année Érotique: Music of Serge Gainsbourg	2009
82529	Mark Taylor	Spectre	2009
82528	Bridge Quartet	Night	2009
82527	Anthony Branker & Ascent	Blessings	2009
82526	Thomas Marriott	Flexicon	2009
82525	John Stowell	Solitary Tales	2009
82524	Hal Galper / Reggie Workman / Rashied Ali	Art-Work	2009
82523	Bob Sneider & Joe Locke	Nocturne for Ava	2009
82522	Ray Levier	Ray's Way	2009
82521	Clay Giberson	Spaceton's Approach	2009
82520	Mark Colby	Reflections	2009
82519	Brad Goode	Polytonal Dance Party	2009
82518	Jeff Johnson	Tall Stranger	2009
82517	Benny Powell	Nextep	2009
82515	Roy Assaf & Eddy Khaimovich Quartet	Andarta	2009
82514	Steve Million	Remembering the Way Home	2009
82513	Corey Christiansen	Roll with It	2009
82512	Dan Heck	Compositionality	2009
82511	Joe Locke	Force of Four	2009
82510	Geof Bradfield	Urban Nomad	2009
82509	Kelly Harland	Long Ago and Far Away, Kelly Harland Sings the Music of Jerome Kern	2008
82508	Alison Ruble	This Is a Bird	2008
82507	Jessica Williams	Songs for a New Century	2008
82506	Bridge Quartet	Day	2008
82505	Doug Miller	Regeneration	2008
82504	Bobby Broom	The Way I Play: Live in Chicago	2008
82503	Bryan Doherty	Rigamarole	2008
82502	Alex Graham	Brand New	2008
82501	Dawn Clement	Break	2008
82500	Matt Jorgensen + 451	Another Morning	2008
82499	Hadley Caliman	Gratitude	2008
82498	Walt Blanton Tony Branco John Nashhan	Monuments	2008
82497	Mitch Paliga	Fall Night	2008
82496	Kelly Brand Nextet	The Door	2008
82495	Thomas Marriott	Crazy: The Music of Willie Nelson	2008
82494	Various Artists	The Cool Season: An Origin Records Holiday Collection, Vol. 2	2008
82493	Brent Jensen w/ Bill Anschell, Jeff Johnson, John Bishop	One More Mile	2008
82492	Richard Cole	Shade	2008
82491	Les DeMerle	Cookin' at the Corner, Vol. 2	2008
82490	Upper Left Trio	Three	2008
82489	Deep Blue Organ Trio	Folk Music	2008
82488	Doug Beavers Rovira Orchestra	Jazz, Baby!	2008
82487	Kim Richmond Ensemble	Live at Cafe Metropol	2008
82486	John McLean	Better Angels	2008
82485	Rob Lockart	Parallel Lives	2008
82484	Greta Matassa	The Smiling Hour	2008
82483	Dee Daniels	Jazzinit	2008
82482	Chris Walden Big Band & The St. John's Choir	Kurt Marti Suite	2008
82481	Tad Britton	Black Hills	2008
82480	David Sills	Green	2008
82479	Sam Yahel	Truth and Beauty	2007
82478	Ron Di Salvio	Essence of Green, A Tribute to Kind of Blue	2007
82477	Darrell Grant	Truth and Reconciliation	2007
82476	Hal Galper / Jeff Johnson / John Bishop	Furious Rubato	2007
82475	Bobby Broom	Song and Dance	2007
82474	Thomas Marriott	Both Sides of the Fence	2007
82473	Kelly Sill / Jim McNeely / Joel Spencer	Boneyard	2007
82472	Geoff Stradling	Les Is Mo'	2007
82471	Les DeMerle	Cookin' at the Corner, Volume 1	2007
82470	Scenes	Along the Way	2007
82469	Bill Anschell	More to the Ear Than Meets the Eye	2007
82468	Phil Kelly & The SW Santa Ana Winds	My Museum	2007
82467	Big Neighborhood	11:11	2007
82466	Trio East	Best Bets	2007
82465	Scott Burns	Passages	2007
82464	Joe Locke / Geoffrey Keezer Group	Live in Seattle	2007
82463	Chris Walden Big Band	No Bounds	2007
82462	Toby Koenigsberg	Sense	2007
82461	Jessica Williams	Billy's Theme: A Tribute to Dr. Billy Taylor	2007
82460	Sonando	Tres	2007
82459	John Moulder	Trinity	2007
82458	David Sills	Down the Line	2007
82457	Chris Walden Big Band	Winter Games	2007
82456	Seattle Repertory Jazz Orchestra	Sacred Music of Duke Ellington	2007
82455	John Bishop	Nothing If Not Something	2007
82454	Upper Left Trio	Sell Your Soul Side	2007
82453	Brent Jensen	Trios	2007
82452	Greta Matassa	Favorites from a Long Walk	2007
82451	Box	Ten Variations on an Unknown Theme	2007
82450	Gloria Cooper	Dedicated to You	2007
82449	Brad Wheeler	The Future Was Yesterday	2006
82448	Ben Thomas	Triskaidekaphobia	2006
82447	PJ Newman	The Hand of Dog	2005
82446	Alex Graham	The Good Life	2005
82445	Matt Otto	Red	2006
82444	Big Neighborhood	Neighbors	2006
82443	John Stowell	Resonance	2006
82442	Thomas Marriott	Individuation	2006
82441	Lower Monumental	Mayday Session	2006
82440	Collier & Dean	Duets	2005
82439	Chris Walden Big Band	Home of My Heart	2006
82438	Les DeMerle	The Jazz Spirit of Christmas	2005
82437	David Sills	Eastern View	2006
82436	Tom Collier	Mallet Jazz	2006
82435	Randy Halberstadt	Parallel Tracks	2005
82434	New Stories	Hope Is in the Air	2005
82433	Jonas Tauber	Storm Walking Singing	2006
82432	Les DeMerle	Hittin' the Blue Notes, Volume 2	2005
82431	Kim Richmond / Clay Jenkins Ensemble	Crossweave	2006
82430	Gary Hobbs	Of My Times	2006
82429	Jeff Johnson	Near Earth	2006
82428	Giacomo Gates	Centerpiece	2006
82427	Brent Jensen / Rob Walker Quintet	Art of the Groove	2006
82426	John Gross / Billy Mintz	Beautiful You	2006
82425	Deardorf / Peterson Group	Portal	2006
82424	Tim Jensen	A Mind for the Scenery	2006
82423	Various Artists	Modern Jazz: A Collection of Seattle's Finest Jazz	2006
82422	Jonas Tauber with William Thomas, Doug Haning	Prime Numbers	2006
82421	Marc Seales	A Time, A Place, A Journey	2006
82420	Michael Vlatkovich Tritet w/ Jonas Tauber and Ken Ollis	Queen Dynamo	2006
82419	Matt Jorgensen +451	Hope	2005
82418	Steve Korn	Points in Time	2005
82417	Phil Kelly	Convergence Zone	2005
82415	Clay Giberson	Aiming True, Vol. 1	2005
82414	Upper Left Trio	Cycling	2005
82413	Kim Richmond Concert Jazz Orchestra	Refractions	2005
82412	Jim Knapp Orchestra	Secular Breathing	2005
82411	Mimi Fox with Greta Matassa	Two for the Road	2005
82410	Don Lanphere	Where Do You Start?	2005
82408	Various Artists	Winter: An Origin Records Holiday Collection	2005
82407	The Acoustic Jazz Quartet	Organic	2005
82406	John Stowell	The Banff Sessions	2005
82405	Les DeMerle	Hittin' the Blue Notes, Vol. 1	2005
82404	William Thomas	Notes from a Drummer	2005
82403	Brent Jensen with David Sills	Stay Cool	2005
82402	Kelly Harland	Twelve Times Romance	2005
82401	Matt Jorgensen +451	Quiet Silence	2005
82400	Gregg Keplinger / Reuben Radding / Daniel Carter	Language	2005
82399	Seattle Repertory Jazz Orchestra	Srjo Live	2005
82398	Mark Taylor with Radioaction	After Hours	2005
82397	Clay Giberson	Upper Road	2005
82396	Brent Jensen with the Acoustic Jazz Quartet	The Sound of a Dry Martini	2005
82395	The Jazz Police	The Music of Daniel Barry	2005
82394	Lynn Bush with New Stories	Still Life	2005
82393	Greta Matassa	All This and Heaven Too	2005
82392	Vasilic Nenad	Folk Songs	2005
82391	Don Lanphere with New Stories	Home at Last	2005
82390	John Bishop with Jeff Johnson, Rick Mandyck, John Stowell	Scenes	2005
82389	Mimi Fox	Standards	2003
82388	Clay Giberson	Mirador	2003
82387	Ben Black	Remembered Faces / Private Places	2003
82386	Jeff Johnson	The Art of Falling	2003
82385	Hans Teuber	Lucky	2003
82384	Richard Cole	The Forgotten	2003
82383	Marius Nordal	Ways of the Hand	2003
82382	Hans Fahling	Hamburg: Port of Call	2003
82381	Ben Thomas	The Mystagogue	2003
82380	Steve Korn	Pride & Joy	2003
82379	Paul West	Lucky So & So	2003
82378	Don Lanphere	Like a Bird	2003
82377	Matt Jorgensen +451	The Road Begins Here	2003
82376	Various Artists	The Piano: The Best of Seattle Jazz	2003
82375	Yoshiyuki Yamanaka	Great Time	2003
82374	Flatland	Origin of Species	2002
82373	Don Lanphere	Year 'Round Christmas	2002
82372	New Stories	Speakin Out	2002
82370	Jeff Johnson	Free	2002
82369	Gregg Keplinger and Rick Mandyck	Tribute	2001
82368	Steve Korn	Here and Now	2001
82367	Pax Wallace	Language Arts	2001
82366	Richard Cole	A Glance Back	2001
82365	Radioaction	Hi-Fi	2001
82364	Ben Thomas	The Madman's Difference	2001
82363	Don Lanphere and Pete Christlieb	Get Happy	2001
82362	Flatland	The Satellite	2001
82361	Marius Nordal	Notoriety	2001
82360	Mike Denny	Looking In	2001
82359	New Stories	Remember Why	2000
82358	John Bishop	Walk Spirit, Talk Spirit	2000
82357	Mike Denny Rick Mandyck Jeff Johnson John Bishop	Now...Here...This	2000
82356	New Stories	Circled by Hounds	2000
82001	Matt Jorgensen +451	The Sonarchy Session	2001

=== OA2 Records ===
Cat. #	Artist	Album	Year
22262	Anthony Stanco	My Way: Live at the Blue Llama Jazz Club	2026
22261	Clarence Hines Jazz Orchestra	Along the Way	2026
22260	Danny Green	Let the Music Happen	2026
22259	Fumi Tomita	Yokai: Songs of the Japanese Supernatural	2026
22258	Todd DelGiudice	Mas Alto	2026
22256	Jun Iida	Bellflower	2026
22255	George Cotsirilos	In the Wee Hours	2026
22254	Andrew Moorhead	Mirage	2026
22251	Ben Markley Big Band	Tuesday Morning Feeling	2026
22250	Owen Chen & Eternal Wind	The Ghibli Collection	2026
22249	Steve Kovalcheck	Buckshot Blues	2026
22248	Lisanne Lyons	May I Come In	2026
22247	Anna Kolchina	Reach for Tomorrow	2026
22246	Kate Olson	So It Goes	2026
22245	Gil Livni	All In	2026
22244	Everything Sacred, Nothing Serious	Kelsey Mines	2025
22243	Peace Vibes	Ted Piltzecker	2025
22242	In the Groove: Live at the Alluvion	Anthony Stanco	2025
22241	Waking Dream	Randy Napoleon	2025
22240	Aapi Jazz Collective	Identity	2025
22239	Premazzi / Nasser Quartet	From What I Recall	2025
22238	Medler Sextet	River Paths	2025
22237	Ben Markley	Tell the Truth	2025
22236	Jason Keiser	Kind of Kenny	2024
22235	Andy Wheelock	Whee3Trio: In the Wheelhouse	2024
22233	Russell Haight	Go Forth	2024
22232	Charlie Apicella & Iron City Meet the Griots Speak	Call to Action / Call to Prayer	2024
22231	Mai-Liis	Kaleidoscope	2024
22230	Anthony Stanco	Stanco's Time	2024
22229	Jihee Heo	Flow	2024
22228	Angela Verbrugge	Somewhere	2024
22227	Live Edge Trio w/ Steve Nelson	Closing Time	2024
22226	Idit Shner & Mhondoro	Ngatibatanei / Let Us Unite!	2024
22225	Zach Rich	Solidarity	2024
22224	Randy Napoleon	The Door Is Open: The Music of Gregg Hill	2024
22222	Francesco Crosara	Circular Motion	2024
22221	Jun Iida	Evergreen	2024
22220	Frank Kohl	Pacific	2024
22219	Russell Kranes, Alex Levine, Sam Weber, Sa	Anchor Points	2024
22218	Darden Purcell	Love's Got Me in a Lazy Mood	2023
22217	Ben Winkelman	Heartbeat	2023
22216	Ted Piltzecker	Vibes on a Breath	2023
22215	Paul Tynan & Aaron Lington	Bicoastal Collective: Chapter Six	2023
22214	Charlie Apicella & Iron City Meet the Griots	Destiny Calling	2023
22213	Stephen Jones & Ben Haugland	Road to Nowhere	2023
22212	Jason Keiser	Shaw's Groove	2023
22211	Andrew Moorhead	Interleaved	2023
22210	Mason Razavi	Six-String Standards	2023
22209	Dan Trudell	Fishin' Again: A Tribute to Clyde Stubblefiel	2023
22208	Libby York	Dreamland	2023
22207	Wil Swindler's Elevenet	Space Bugs	2023
22206	Susan Reed	Thousands of Ways	2023
22205	Kyle Aho	Rituals	2023
22204	William Flynn	Seaside	2022
22203	Ben Morris	Pocket Guides	2022
22202	Randy Napoleon	Puppets: The Music of Gregg Hill	2022
22201	George Cotsirilos Quartet	Refuge	2022
22200	Ben Markley	Ari's Funhouse	2022
22199	Rich Pellegrin	Passage: Solo Improvisations II	2022
22198	Idit Shner & Mhondoro	Heat Wave	2022
22197	Stephen Martin	High Plains	2022
22196	Matt Olson	Open Spaces	2022
22195	Nathan Borton	Each Step	2022
22194	Phil Parisot	Inventions	2022
22193	Randy Napoleon	Rust Belt Roots: Randy Napoleon Plays Wes Mon	2022
22192	Karen Marguth	Until	2022
22191	Steve Barnes, Steven Heffner, Will St Peter	Honestly	2022
22189	Rich Pellegrin	Solitude: Solo Improvisations	2021
22188	Mai-Liis	Mai-Liis on Life	2022
22187	Idit Shner	Live at the Jazz Station	2021
22185	Jihee Heo	Are You Ready?	2021
22184	Markus Rutz	Blueprints - Figure Two: New Designs	2020
22183	Gregory Dudzienski Quartet	Beautiful Moments	2020
22182	Jeremy Levy Jazz Orchestra	The Planets: Reimagined	2020
22181	Shelly Rudolph	The Way We Love	2020
22180	LP and the Vinyl	Heard and Seen	2020
22179	Tim Shaghoian	Gentle Beacons	2020
22178	Lolly Allen	Coming Home	2020
22176	Bob Ravenscroft & Inner Journeys	Phantasmagoria	2019
22175	Carrie Wicks	Reverie	2019
22174	Markus Rutz	Blueprints - Figure One: Frameworks	2019
22173	Kelley Johnson	Something Good	2019
22172	Ben Markley Quartet	Slow Jam	2019
22171	Extended	Harbinger	2019
22170	Ezra Weiss Big Band	We Limit Not the Truth of God	2019
22169	Erik Skov	Liminality	2019
22168	Rosana Eckert	Sailing Home	2019
22167	Matt Olson	789 Miles	2019
22166	Charlie Apicella & Iron City	Groove Machine	2019
22165	Fumi Tomita	The Elephant Vanishes: Jazz Interpretations O	2019
22164	Ben Winkelman	Balance	2019
22163	Rich Pellegrin	Down	2019
22162	Michael Kocour	East of the Sun	2019
22161	Kristen Strom	Moving Day: The Music of John Shifflett	2018
22160	Mike Steinel Quintet	Song and Dance	2019
22159	Tucker Antell	Grime Scene	2019
22158	Jarod Bufe	New Spaces	2019
22156	Ben Markley	Basic Economy	2018
22155	Shawn Maxwell's New Tomorrow	Music in My Mind	2018
22154	Danny Green Trio Plus Strings	One Day It Will	2018
22153	Chamber 3	Transatlantic	2018
22152	Electric Squeezebox Orchestra	The Falling Dream	2018
22151	George Cotsirilos Quartet	Mostly in Blue	2018
22150	Jeff Baker	Phrases	2018
22149	Edgar Steinitz	Roots Unknown	2018
22148	Phil Parisot	Creekside	2018
22147	Idit Shner Quartet	9 Short Stories	2018
22146	Debbie Poryes	Loving Hank	2018
22145	Unhinged Sextet	Don't Blink	2018
22144	Errol Rackipov Group	Distant Dreams	2018
22143	Paul Tynan & Aaron Lington	Bicoastal Collective Chapter Five	2018
22142	Mason Razavi	Quartet Plus, Volume 2	2018
22141	Colorado Jazz Repertory Orchestra	Invitation	2018
22140	Tom Dempsey / Tim Ferguson Quartet	Waltz New	2018
22139	Ben Markley Big Band	Clockwise the Music of Cedar Walton	2017
22138	Gustavo Cortinas	Esse	2017
22137	Phil Parisot	Lingo	2017
22136	Erik Jekabson	A Brand New Take	2017
22135	Shawn Maxwell	Shawn Maxwell's New Tomorrow	2017
22134	Afro Bop Alliance Big Band	Revelation	2017
22133	Cheryl Fisher	Quietly There	2017
22132	Will Goble	Consider the Blues	2016
22131	New Standard Jazz Orchestra	Waltz About Nothing	2016
22130	Alex Goodman	Border Crossing	2016
22129	Daria	Strawberry Fields Forever	2016
22128	Danny Green	Altered Narratives	2016
22127	Raul Agraz	Between Brothers	2016
22126	Svetlana Shmulyian	Night at the Speakeasy	2016
22125	Carrie Wicks	Maybe	2015
22124	Jeff Jenkins Organization	The Arrival	2015
22123	Hans Luchs	Time Never Pauses	2015
22122	Ben Winkelman	The Knife	2015
22121	Juli Wood Quartet	Synkka Metsa - Dark Forest	2015
22120	Electric Squeezebox Orchestra	Cheap Rent	2015
22119	Michael Kocour	Wherever You Go, There You Are	2015
22118	Adam Shulman Sextet	Here/There	2015
22117	Barney McClure	Show Me!	2015
22116	Unhinged Sextet	Clarity	2015
22115	Chamber 3	Grassroots	2015
22114	Rich Pellegrin Quintet	Episodes IV-VI	2014
22113	Danny Green	After the Calm	2014
22112	Kronomorfic	Entangled	2014
22111	Gordon Lee / The Mel Brown Septet	Tuesday Night	2014
22110	Paul Tynan & Aaron Lington	Bicoastal Collective: Chapter 4	2014
22109	Mark Buselli	Untold Stories	2014
22108	Nelda Swiggett Stringtet	Blue-Eyed Painted Lady	2014
22107	Chris Parker	Full Circle	2014
22106	The Jim Olsen Ensemble	We See Stars	2014
22105	Craig Yaremko Organ Trio	Cyo3	2013
22104	George Cotsirilos Trio	Variations	2013
22103	Florian Hoefner Group	Falling Up	2013
22102	Lynn Baker Quartet	Lectrocoustic	2013
22101	Chris Amemiya & Jazz Coalesence	In the Rain Shadow	2013
22100	Steve Owen	Stand Up Eight	2013
22099	Stan Bock & The New Tradition	Feelin' It	2012
22098	Lary Barilleau	Carmen's Mambo	2012
22097	Hashem Assadullahi	Pieces	2012
22096	Nathan Eklund	Crafty Christmas	2011
22095	Michael Webster	Momentus	2012
22094	Paul Tynan/Aaron Lington	Bicoastal Collective: Chapter Three	2011
22093	Carrie Wicks	Barely There	2011
22092	Grupo Los Santos	Clave Heart	2012
22091	Steve Williams & Jazz Nation	Steve Williams & Jazz Nation	2011
22090	Dan Cavanagh Trio	Heart of the Geyser	2011
22089	Florian Hoefner Group	Songs Without Words	2011
22088	Sara Leib	Secret Love	2011
22087	Budman/Levy Orchestra	From There to Here	2011
22086	Afro Bop Alliance	Una Mas	2011
22085	AJ Kluth's Aldric	Anvils & Broken Bells	2011
22084	Tunnel Six	Lake Superior	2011
22083	Daniel Jamieson's Danjam Orchestra	Sudden Appearance	2011
22082	Liam Sillery	Priorite	2011
22081	Debbie Poryes & Bruce Williamson	Two and Fro	2011
22080	Mark O'Connor Quintet	Suspended Reality	2011
22079	Rich Pellegrin Quintet	Three-Part Odyssey	2011
22078	Todd DelGiudice	Pencil Sketches	2011
22077	Jazzvox Presents:	In Your Own Backyard	2011
22076	Gordon Lee	This Path	2010
22075	Wil Swindler Elevenet	Universe B	2010
22074	Lynn Baker Quartet	Azure Intention	2010
22073	The Kora Band	Cascades	2010
22072	Paul Tynan & Aaron Lington	Bicoastal Collective: Chapter Two	2010
22071	Dan Gailey Jazz Orchestra	What Did You Dream?	2010
22070	Nadav Snir-Zelniker Trio	Thinking Out Loud	2010
22069	Nathan Eklund Group	Coin Flip	2010
22068	Artswest: Vocal Jazz Collective	Redefinition	2010
22067	Michael Zilber	Billy Collins Project: Eleven on Turning Ten	2010
22066	Andrew Oliver Sextet	82% Chance of Rain	2010
22065	Carrie Wicks	I'll Get Around to It	2010
22064	Debbie Poryes	Catch Your Breath	2010
22063	Nelda Swiggett	This Time	2010
22062	George Cotsirilos Trio	Past Present	2010
22061	Liam Sillery	Phenomenology	2010
22060	Vince Norman / Joe McCarthy Big Band	Bright Future	2010
22059	Gail Pettis	Here in the Moment	2010
22058	Tom Tallitsch	Perspective	2010
22057	Josh Moshier & Mike LeBrun	Joy Not Jaded	2010
22056	Jeff Baker	Of Things Not Seen	2010
22055	AJ Kluth Quintet	Twice Now	2010
22054	Ben Neuman	Introductions	2010
22053	Fred Forney	Chasing Horizons	2010
22052	Ben Markley	Second Introduction	2010
22051	Paul Tynan & Aaron Lington	Bicoastal Collective: Chapter One	2010
22050	Liam Sillery	Outskirts	2010
22049	Tim Green & Trio Cambia	Change of Seasons	2010
22048	Dan Cavanagh Jazz Emporium Big Band	Pulse	2010
22047	The Here & Now	Break of Day	2010
22046	Idit Shner	Tuesday's Blues	2010
22045	Doug Hamilton	Jazz Band	2010
22044	Glenn White	Sacred Machines	2010
22043	Katie King	Harry's Fight	2010
22042	Tom Tallitsch	Medicine Man	2010
22041	Paul West / Mark Brown	Words & Music	2010
22040	Ben Paterson	Breathing Space	2010
22039	Daniel Barry	Walk All Ways	2010
22038	Gail Pettis	May I Come In?	2010
22037	Greg Duncan Quintet	Unveiled	2010
22036	Barney McClure Trio, Featuring Mike Denny	Spot	2010
22035	Vince Norman / Joe McCarthy Big Band	Words Cannot Express	2010
22034	Stan Bock Ensemble	Your Check's in the Mail	2010
22033	Seattle Womens Jazz Orchestra	Meeting of the Waters	2010
22032	Dean Schmidt	I Know Nothing	2010
22031	Jeff Baker	Shopping for Your Heart	2010
22030	Liam Sillery	On the Fly	2010
22029	Joan Hickey	Between the Lines	2010
22028	Jay Lawrence	Thermal Strut	2010
22027	The Taylor / Fidyk Big Band	Live at Blues Alley	2010
22026	Brian Owen	Unmei	2010
22025	George Cotsirilos	On the Rebop	2010
22024	Alex Budman and the Contemporary Jazz Orchestra	Instruments of Mass Pleasure	2010
22023	Laura Welland	Dissertation on the State of Bliss	2010
22022	Kyle Asche Organ Trio	The Hook Up	2010
22021	Amy Stephens	My Many Moods	2010
22020	Liam Sillery Quintet	Minor Changes	2010
22019	Jeff Baker	Monologue	2005
22018	Seattle Womens Jazz Orchestra	Dreamcatcher	2005
22017	Mark Quint	The Principle of Uncertainty	2005
22016	Gordon Lee and the Gleeful Big Band	Flying Dream	2005
22015	Tim Green	Jeannie's Song	2005
22014	Paul West	Being Alone	2005
22013	Laura Welland	Love Is Never Out of Season	2006
22012	George Cotsirilos	Silenciosa	2006
22011	Mark Buselli / Claude Sifferlen	Take the Mitsu	2006
22010	Jeff Baker	Baker Sings Chet	2006
22009	George Mitchell	Play Zone	2006
22008	Christian Eckert / Gary Versace / Matt Jorgensen	Ny3	2003
22007	Jimmy Bennington	Midnight Choir	2003
22006	Carolyn Graye with Jessica Williams	Songs	2003
22005	Marco de Carvalho	For the Moment	2003
22004	Chris Parker	Late in Lisbon	2003
22003	Stan Bock Ensemble	Night Grooves	2003
22002	Tim Green	Catching Yourself Gracefully	2003
22001	Cynthia Mullis	Inside Job	2003

=== Origin Classical ===
Cat. #	Artist	Album	Year
33030	Jon Hamar	Música Callada	2026
33029	Arx Duo	Ambient Resonances	2023
33028	Naama Liany	Daydream	2023
33027	Doug Lofstrom	Music for Strings	2021
33026	Dan Dean	Fanfare for the Common Man	2021
33025	Michael Waldrop	Time Frames	2021
33024	Idit Shner	Minerva	2019
33023	Aaron Lington	Secondary Impressions	2019
33022	Jim Gailloreto Jazz String Quintet	The Pythiad	2017
33021	Dan Dean	Songs Without Words	2017
33020	Gwendolyn Dease	Beguiled	2016
33019	Chérie Hughes & Roberto Limón	On My People	2015
33018	Jim Knapp's Scrape	Approaching Vyones	2013
33017	Idit Shner	Le Merle Noir	2013
33016	Yumiko Endo Schlaffer	Rhapsodie: Prism of 20th Century Music	2013
33015	Brian Chin	Eventide	2012
33014	Doug Lofstrom	Concertino: The Music of Doug Lofstrom	2012
33013	Tom Collier	Plays Haydn, Mozart, Telemann and Others	2012
33012	Douglas Detrick's AnyWhen Ensemble	Rivers Music	2011
33011	Free Range Saxophone Quartet	Fireflies	2011
33010	Brian Chin	Universal Language	2010
33009	Tom Collier	Mallet Fantastique	2010
33008	Idit Sher & Yumiko Endo Schlaffer	Fissures: 20th Century Music for Saxophone & Harp	2010
33007	John Adler	Confronting Inertia	2009
33006	Jim Gailloreto's Jazz String Quartet	American Complex	2009
33005	Daniel Barry	Music of the Spheres	2009
33004	Linda Tsatsanis & John Lenti	And I Remain: Three Love Stories	2009
33003	Florie Rothenberg	Voices of Trees	2009
33002	Chris Walden	Symphony No. 1: The Four Elements	2009
33001	Seattle Trumpet Consort	After Baroque: Music for the Natural Trumpet	2008
