= Jeff Johnson (bass player) =

- Born: December 12, 1954 (age 71); Minneapolis, Minnesota
- Genres: Jazz
- Instruments: Double Bass, Bass (guitar)
- Years active: 1971 - Present
- Website: www.jazzbassist.com

Born In Minneapolis, Jeff Johnson ("Free" to some of his colleagues) left at age 20, spending time in Philadelphia and New York, and has worked with jazz musicians including Philly Joe Jones, Charlie Rouse, Barney Kessel, Chet Baker, Lew Tabackin, Eddie Daniels, Joanne Brackeen, Julian Priester, Billy Hart, George Cables, Bud Shank, Claudio Roditti, and Michael Wolfe. Vocalists who have been accompanied by Johnson include Jay Clayton, Ernestine Anderson, Karrin Allyson, Mark Murphy, Rebecca Parris, Annie Ross and Marlena Shaw.

Johnson's prominent collaborators include pianists Jessica Williams, beginning in Seattle in 1991, and Hal Galper, after they met at the Port Townsend Jazz Festival in 1993.

He now leads various small ensembles, composes, and travels frequently for performance projects and recording dates around the world.

== Discography ==
=== As leader/co-leader ===
- Harbinger (1984)
- My Heart (1992)
- Area 51 (1992)
- Lost Men (1993)
- Maybeck Duets with Hal Galper (Philology, 1998)
- Free (1999)
- The Art of Falling (2001)
- Winter: An Origin Records Holiday Collection with Hans Teuber, Dave Peterson and John Bishop (2002)
- Near Earth (2004)
- Furious Rubato with Hal Galper and John Bishop (Origin, 2007)
- Tall Stranger (Origin, 2008)
- Apothecary with Jon Alberts and Tad Britton (Origin, 2009)
- Suitcase with Hans Teuber, Steve Moore, Eric Eagle (Origin, 2011)

=== As a member ===
Scenes
With John Stowell, John Bishop and Rick Mandyck

- Scenes (Origin, 2001)
- Along the Way (Origin, 2006)

=== As sideman ===
With John Bishop

- Walk Spirit, Talk Spirit (1992)
- Nothing if Not Something (2004)

With Ben Black

- In a Mellow Tone (1999)
- Remembered Faces/Private Places (2001)

With Richard Cole

- A Glance Back (Bituminous Music, 1994)
- Shade (2008)

With Hal Galper

- Live at Vartan Jazz (Vartan Jazz, 1994)
- Rebop (Enja, 1995) – also with Jerry Bergonzi
- Fugue State (Blue Chip Jazz, 1998)
- Sweet Beat Blues (Red, 1998)
- Let's Call This That (Double-Time, 1999)
- E Pluribus Unum: Live in Seattle (Origin, 2010)
- Airegin Revisited (Origin, 2012)

With Jessica Williams

- Momentum (1994)
- A Song That I Heard (1994)
- In the Pocket (1994)
- Inventions (1995)
- Joy (1996)
- Jessica's Blues (1998)

With others

- Art Resnick, A Gift (Capri, 1989)
- Sharpshooters, Choked Up (1997)
- Mike Denny, Now...Here...This (1997)
- Bert Wilson, Mothers Day in Albuquerque (1998)
- Jan Stentz Group, Forever (1998)
- Kendra Shank, Wish (1998)
- Jack Brownlow, Suddenly It's Bruno (1999)
- Steve Korn, Here and Now (1999)
- Wenda Zonnefeld, Latina by Proxy (2000)
- Aaron Parks, The Wizard (2001)
- Dave Peck, Out of Seattle (2002)
- Bill Macdonough, House of Jade (2004)
- Randy Halberstadt, Parallel Tracks (2004)
- Thomas Marriott, Individuation (2004)
- Dave Peck, Good Road (2005)
- Thomas Marriott, Both Side of the Fence (2006)
- Bill Anschell, More to The Ear than Meets the Eye (2006)
- Jeff Baker, Shopping For Your Heart (2007)
- Tad Britton, Black Hills (2007)
- Brent Jensen et al., One More Mile (2008)
- Katie King, Harry's Fight (2008)
- Thomas Marriott, Flexicon (2009)

== Awards ==
- 2001 Earshot Jazz Instrumentalist of the Year
- 2002 Northwest Recording of the Year, The Art of Falling
- 2011 Inducted into the Seattle Jazz Hall of Fame
