= Fred Catero =

American record producer and engineer (1933–2022)

- Born: February 4, 1933
- Died: October 6, 2022 (aged 89)
- Education: Highschool/ Self-taught
- Occupations: Recording Engineer and Music Producer
- Known for: CBS/Columbia, the Catero Sound Company, Automatt Studios
- Parents: Fred Catero Sr. (Father); Rosa Perez (Mother)

Fred Catero (February 4, 1933 – October 6, 2022) was an American record producer and engineer. Catero was originally from New York City, where he worked for CBS Records/Columbia, recording artists such as Chicago and Blood, Sweat & Tears. Invited by producer Roy Halee, Catero moved in the 1960s to San Francisco to work for Columbia Records there. In San Francisco, Catero worked on albums by Bob Dylan, Al Kooper, Tower of Power and Santana, many of these under producer David Rubinson at the Automatt. He also produced and engineered recordings with Aaron Copland, Janis Joplin, Linda Ronstadt and Mel Tormé. He also worked for the Automatt Studios, recording musicians such as Herbie Hancock and Santana.

In the 1980s he started an independent label Catero Records to focus on jazz artists. Artists on Catero Records included Laurie Antonioli and Paul Speer. In the mid-1980s, Catero was credited for getting new-age music accepted as a category of the Grammy Awards.

== Early life ==
Catero spent his early childhood with his adoptive parents Fred Catero Sr. and Rosa Perez in Jacksonville, FL. At the age of 7, his adoptive mother moved with him to New York, where they lived in the Spanish Harlem (El Barrio) neighborhood. Early on, Catero showed a passion for music and an interest in sound recording and preservation. As a teenage boy in the 1940s, he began collecting radio shows mainly from the 1930s, 1940s, and 1950s, eventually gathering a collection of almost 33,500 radio shows over his lifetime. Catero spent hours in his spare time working precisely restoring his collection of radio shows to an acceptable audio quality.

== Recording career ==
=== 1950s ===
In the early 1950s, Catero started out working as a studio manager and then engineer in New York's Sanders and Rockhill Recording Studios. He then moved on to work for CBS/Columbia in New York as a mastering engineer and later as a studio engineer ^{[1]} recording some of Columbia's most famous performers, including Barbra Streisand, Big Brother, and the Holding Company, Blood, Sweat & Tears, Bob Dylan, The Chambers Brothers, Chicago, Cleo Laine, Count Basie Band, David Brubeck, Janis Joplin, Linda Ronstadt, and Mel Tormé. He also had the opportunity to work with Aaron Copland, Muhammad Ali, and Frank Lloyd Wright.

=== 1960s and 70s ===
In the late 1960s New York record producer David Rubinson, with whom Fred had worked at CBS/Columbia, invited him to move to San Francisco to form the Catero Sound Company, as a subsidiary of the Fillmore Corporation, a production, management, and recording enterprise consisting of promoter Bill Graham, producer David Rubinson, and attorney Brian Rohan, with Fred in charge of the recording engineering.

In San Francisco, Catero worked on many albums by top artists, including Herbie Hancock, Malo’, Patti Labelle, Santana, The Pointer Sisters, and Tower of Power, first as chief engineer of the Catero Sound Company and later at the Automatt sound recording studio.

=== 1980s and 90s ===
In the early 1980s, Catero started his independent record label, Catero Records, with a diverse roster of recording artists including Don Lewis, Roberta Vandervort, Ernie Mansfield, Mel Martin & Randy Vincent, Paul Speer, Terry Garthwaite, Cyrille Verdeaux, Daniel Goldberg & Pino Marrone, Dick Hindman Trio, Nick Lane Band, Chris James Quartet, Barbara Mauritz, Laurie Antonioli, Rhyth-O-Matics, Eric Muhler, Doug Mc'Keehan, Nuclear Whales Saxophone Orchestra, Skipper Wise and Edwin Cohen, and Mimi Fox. Catero was facing distribution challenges and the record label was closed in the late 1980s.

He worked with Mark Keller and Jeffrey Cohen at Keller & Cohen's Boomtown recording studio in Sausalito, and also taught audio engineering at the College for Recording Arts, San Francisco until the college closed its doors in 1994. Catero continued to work as a freelance sound engineer into his late seventies/early eighties.

=== Career highlights ===
Catero was a lifetime member of the National Academy of Recording Arts and Sciences / NARAS (Recording Academy), the organization that awards Grammys, and a founding member of its New York and San Francisco Chapters. He served multiple terms as president of the San Francisco Chapter as well as being elected multiple times to the National Board of Trustees for the Recording Academy.

In the mid-1980s, Catero was credited for getting new-age music accepted as a category of the Grammy Awards.

== Awards ==
- Catero was nominated by the Recording Academy for a Grammy Award in the category Best Engineered Recording (non/classical) for Blood, Sweat, and Tears in 1969.
- In the years 1976 and 1977, awards for Best Local Engineer followed.
- In 1975, he was awarded the “Ampex Golden Reel Award” for Con Funk Shun - CANDY.
- In 1979, Catero received the Ralph J. Gleason Award.
- In 1989, Catero was voted Most Valuable Player by the Recording Academy.
