= Art Hirahara =

American jazz pianist and composer (born 1971)

- Born: 1971 (age 54–55)
- Genres: Jazz
- Occupations: Musician, composer
- Instrument: Piano
- Years active: 1990s–present
- Website: arthirahara.com

Art Hirahara (born 1971) is an American jazz pianist and composer.

== Life and career ==
Hirahara started playing the piano at the age of four. He studied at the Oberlin Conservatory of Music and the California Institute of the Arts. While at Oberlin, he had jazz lessons with pianist Neal Creque. He has been part of the jazz scene in New York since 2003, after moving there from the San Francisco Bay Area.

Hirahara's debut album, Edge of This Earth, was released in 2000. In 2011 Posi-Tone Records released Hirahara's Noble Path, a trio album with Yoshi Waki (bass), and Dan Aran (drums). His next Posi-Tone album, Libations & Meditations from 2015, was a trio recording with bassist Linda Oh (bass) and drummer John Davis.

His album Central Line was released in January 2017.His music video for Brooklyn Express was the winner at the Audio Shoot International Video & Film Festival, the Queen City Film Festival, and the Raleigh Film and Art Festival, all in 2019.

== Playing style ==
According to Nate Chinen at The New York Times, Hirahara "brings a broad base of knowledge to his enterprise: electronic composition, West African music, Balinese gamelan, [and] multiple strains of the avant-garde".

== Discography ==
An asterisk (*) indicates that the year is that of release.

=== As leader/co-leader ===
Year recorded	Year released	Title	Label	Personnel/Notes
2000		Edge of This Earth	Art Hirahara	With Bob Kenmotsu (tenor sax), Jeff Alkire (alto sax), Chuck MacKinnon (trumpet), Benjamin Rubin (bass), Jason Lewis (drums)
2010	2011	Noble Path	Posi-Tone	Trio, with Yoshi Waki (bass), Dan Aran (drums, percussion)
2013	2015	Libations & Meditations	Posi-Tone	Trio, with Linda Oh (bass), John Davis (drums)
2015	2017	Central Line	Posi-Tone	Most tracks trio, with Linda May Han Oh (bass), Rudy Royston (drums); some tracks quartet, with Donny McCaslin (tenor sax) added
2017	2018	Sunward Bound	Posi-Tone	Quartet, with Donny McCaslin (tenor sax), Linda May Han Oh (bass), Rudy Royston (drums, percussion)
2018	2020	Balance Point	Posi-Tone	Quartet, with Melissa Aldana (tenor sax), Joe Martin (bass), Rudy Royston (drums)
2020	2021	Open Sky	Posi-Tone	Most tracks trio, with Boris Kozlov (bass), Rudy Royston (drums, percussion); three tracks quartet, with Nicole Glover (tenor sax, soprano sax) added; one track quartet with Behn Gillece (vibraphone) added
2023	2024	Good Company	Posi-Tone	Trio, with Ron Horton (trumpet), Paul Bollenback (guitar)

=== As sideman ===
Year recorded	Leader	Title	Label
1999*	Adam Lane	Hollywood Wedding	Cadence Jazz
2012	Russ Nolan	Tell Me	
2013*	Sean Nowell	The Kung-Fu Masters	Posi-Tone
2013*	Akira Tana	Otonowa	Vegamusic
2014*	Nick Hempton	Odd Man Out	Posi-Tone
2014*	Tom Tallitsch	Ride	Posi-Tone
2016*	Akira Tana	Stars Across the Ocean	Vegamusic
2019*	Akira Tana	Ai San San – Love's Radiance (愛燦燦)	Vegamusic
2019?	Something Blue	Maximum Enjoyment	Posi-Tone
2021	Stacey Kent	Songs from Other Places	Token Productions
2023	Don Braden	Earth Wind and Wonder Volume 2	(Self-released)
2024	Behn Gillece	Stick Together	Posi-Tone
