= Hugo Fernández =

Hugo Fernández may refer to:

- Hugo Fernández (footballer), Uruguayan footballer and manager
- Hugo Fernández (basketball), Chilean basketball player
- Hugo Fernández Faingold, Uruguayan politician
- Hugo Fernández Artucio, Uruguayan teacher of philosophy, historian and politician
- Hugo Fernandez (guitarist), Mexican jazz guitarist
