= Michael Zilber =

Canadian composer and musician

- Born: Vancouver, British Columbia, Canada
- Genre: Jazz
- Occupations: Composer, instrumentalist

Michael Zilber is a Canadian composer and musician. Zilber was born and raised in Vancouver, British Columbia, Canada. He moved to Boston, Massachusetts in his late teens and to New York City in his early twenties. He has performed and/or recorded with Dizzy Gillespie, Sonny Stitt, Dave Liebman, Miroslav Vitous, Bob Berg, Dave Douglas, Rachel Z, and Narada Michael Walden, among many others.

While in New York City, Zilber recorded two critically acclaimed OWL-EMI Records as a leader, "The Heretic" and "Stranger in Brooklyn", which was named one of the top 30 CDs of all time by Jazzfusion.com.

Since his move to San Francisco, Michael has performed in numerous musical settings as a leader and sideman, including co-leading a quartet featuring the drummer Steve Smith and directing CARMA, the Bay Area's "all-star Jazz Orchestra".

Michael's 2000 release, the critically hailed "Two Coasts", features Steve Smith, Rachel Z, James Genus, and Rodney Holmes. This CD was a finalist for the 2001 Independent Music Awards Jazz Record of the Year.

In 2003 Zilber and Smith released a top 20 jazz recording on Blue Jay records entitled "Reimagined" which Michael Brecker called truly amazing and David Liebman said was the next step forward in reworking jazz standards. That same year, Zilber and Liebman were the featured artists on Jazzschool Records inaugural release, "Live at the Jazzschool".

Michael's next release, in 2005 was a reunion with his East Coast comrades Liebman, Bruce Barth, James Genus and Clarence Penn, and featured all original compositions, and was Zilber's first release to be primarily available online.

In 2010, Zilber released a recording of poems set to music, poems by the American poet Billy Collins. Released on Origin Records of Seattle, it received favorable reviews, including from Bill Milkowski of Jazz Times, who said "This is art music of the highest order performed with passion, wit and verve."

Current projects include recordings and performances with guitar master John Stowell, with whom he has released 2 recordings on Origin Records, Shot Through with Beauty in 2011 and Live Beauty in 2015, both records were well-reviewed, including a 4 star review in Downbeat Magazine for Live Beauty. As well Zilber has ongoing performances and recordings with his own quartet and as a member of trumpeter Erik Jekabson's Stringtet and Big Band. The Big Band, the Electric Squeezebox Orchestra, performs weekly at Doc's Lab in San Francisco and will be releasing a CD, Cheap Rent, on Origin Records in August 2015.

Zilber directs the Advanced High School Jazz Workshop at the Jazzschool in Berkeley, California, a group that won Outstanding High School Combo from Downbeat Magazine for 11 consecutive years. He also teaches at the California Jazz Conservatory, including Composition, Advanced Theory and Ensembles.

Zilber is the Director of Jazz and Popular Music at Los Medanos College in Pittsburg, California.

== Partial Discography ==
=== As a Leader ===
- Standard Deviations (2025, Sunnyside Records)
- Mike Drop (2021, Sunnyside Records)
- East West: Music for Big Bands (2018, Origin Records)
- Originals for the Originals (2017, Origin Records)
- Basement Blues (2016, Origin Records)
- Live Beauty (2015, Origin Records)
- Shot Through With Beauty (2011, Origin Records)
- The Billy Collins Project: Eleven on Turning Ten (2009, Origin Records)
- Crossroads: Brooklyn to Berkeley(2005, Independent)
- Dave Liebman and Mike Zilber - Live at the Jazzschool (2003, Jazzschool Records)
- Reimagined, Volume 1: Jazz Standards (2003, Blue Jay Records)
- Two Coasts (2000, Independent)
- Stranger in Brooklyn (1992, OWL/EMI)
- The Heretic (1988, OWL/EMI)

=== In Other Groups ===
- Electric Squeezebox Orchestra - The Falling Dream (Origin Records)
- Electric Squeezebox Orchestra - Cheap Rent (Origin Records)
- Jason Keiser - Kind of Kenny (Origin Records)

== Personal life ==
In 1987, he married singer-actress Carla Anne Smith, who later changed her name to Carla Zilbersmith (1962–2010). They separated in early 2007 and later divorced. Zilber remarried in June 2014.
