= Daniel Dean =

Daniel Dean may refer to:

- the defendant in the trial of Daniel Dean
- the builder of the Dean Family Farm
- Sergeant Daniel "Yoda" Dean, a character in the TV series NYC 22
- Daniel Dean (athlete) (1909–2004), American Olympic athlete
