= Kellye Gray =

American jazz musician

Kellye Gray (22 February, 1954 – 29 December, 2018) was a jazz vocalist from Dallas, Texas.

== Biography ==
A native of Dallas, she learned to play guitar in her teens. During the 1980s, she worked in Austin as technical director for a comedy group that included Sam Kinison and Bill Hicks. As a vocalist she led the Kellye Gray Band and moved to Houston. Her debut album, Standards in Gray, was released by Justice Records in 1990. The album reached No. 12 on the Gavin Report, selling over 75,000 copies. Several years later Tomato Kiss (Proteus) was released. She produced the live album Blue & Pink (Proteus). By 2007 she released Live at the Jazzschool (Grr8) recorded in Berkeley at the Jazzschool. In 2008, KG3 Live at the Bugle Boy (Grr8) was released with an acoustic trio of classical guitar, double bass, and jazz vocals. The trio was recorded at the La Grange, Texas vintage World War II army barracks venue.

She was hired several times by singer Madeline Eastman to teach at Jazz Camp West. She sang at the Bach Dancing & Dynamite Society in Half Moon Bay and at venues in Sausalito and San Francisco. She performed at Houston International Festival, Jazz and Blues Heritage Festival, Lincoln Center, San Francisco Jazz Festival, Snug Harbor, Spoleto Festival USA, Stanford Jazz Festival, and Yoshi's.

She died on December 29, 2018, two weeks after being diagnosed with breast cancer.

== Discography ==
- 1990 Standards in Gray (Justice)
- 1996 Tomato Kiss (Proteus)
- 2002 Blue & Pink (A Live Concert): The Blue Songs (Proteus)
- 2003 Blue & Pink (A Live Concert): The Pink Songs (Proteus)
- 2007 Live at the Jazzschool (Grr8)
- 2008 KG3 Live at the Bugle Boy (Grr8)
- 2013 And They Call Us Cowboys: The Texas Music Project (Grr8)
- 2017 Rendering (Grr8)
- 2022 Purple Gray: A Prince Offering
