= John Stowell =

American jazz guitarist, composer, author, and lecturer

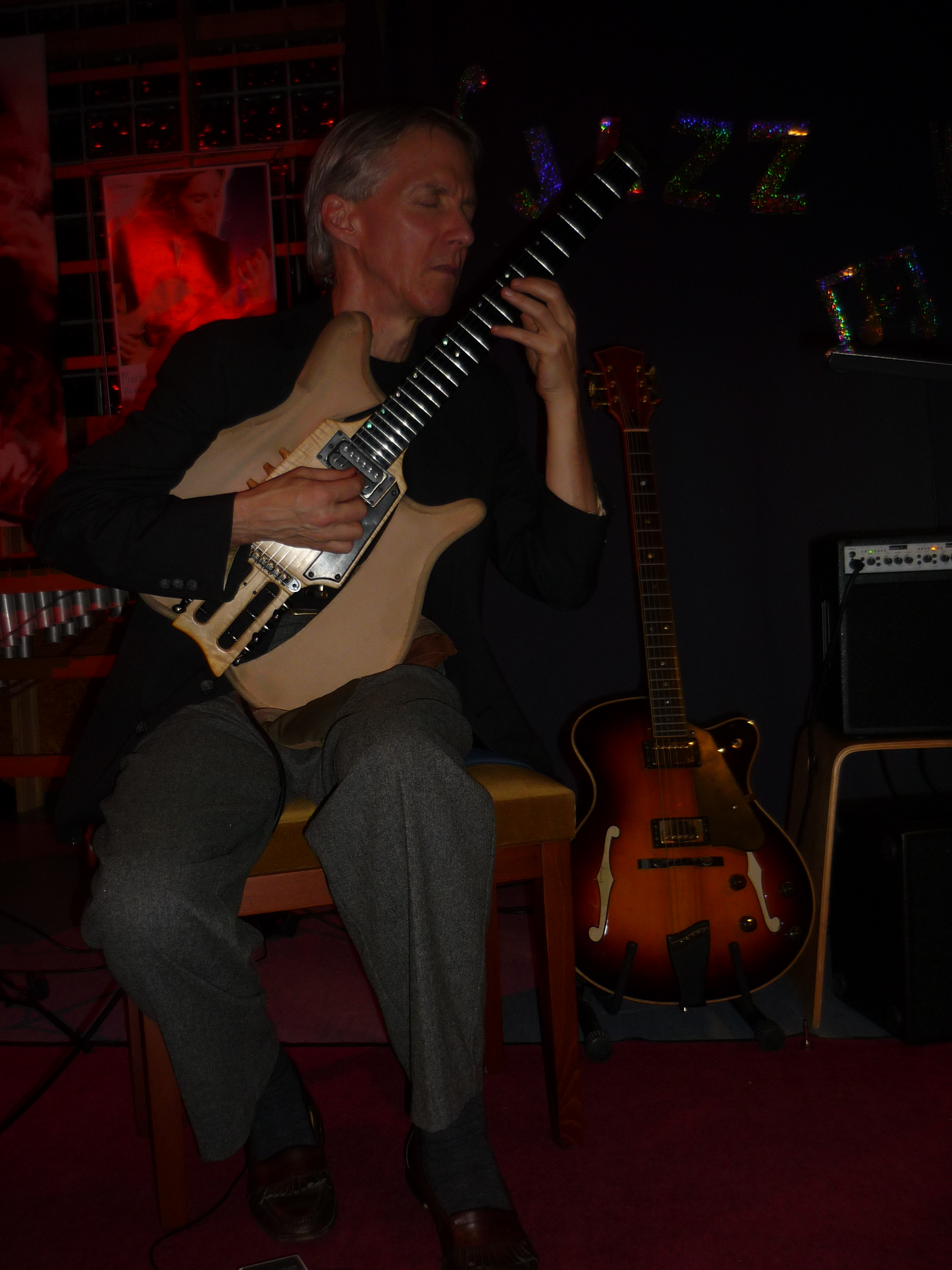
- John Stowell at a concert in Bad Marienberg, Westerwald, November 2010

Background information
- Born: July 30, 1950 (age 75); New York
- Genres: Jazz
- Occupation: Musician
- Instrument: Guitar
- Years active: 1970–present
- Label: Origin
- Website: www.johnstowell.com

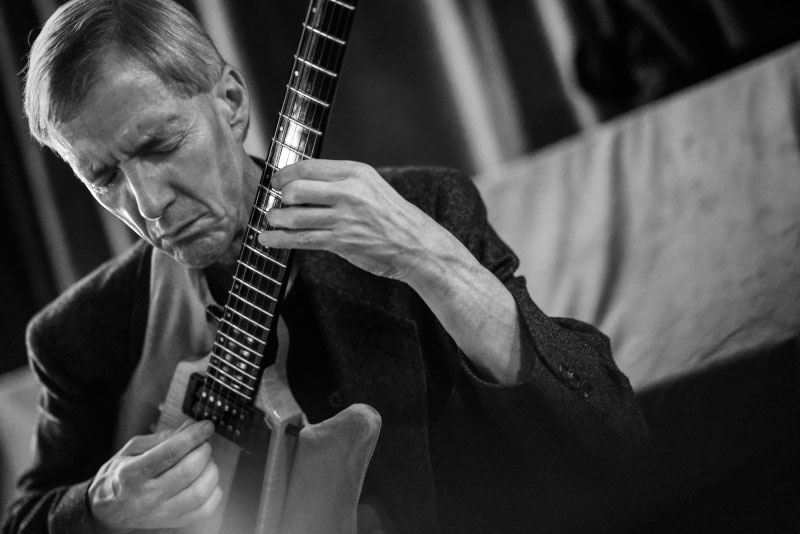
John Stowell (2019) in Aarhus, Denmark

John F. Stowell (born July 30, 1950) is an American jazz guitarist, composer, author, and lecturer.

== Biography ==
Stowell, who plays electric and acoustic guitar, was born in New York and raised in Connecticut. He had private studies with Linc Chamberland and John Mehegan. Several years later he met bassist David Friesen in New York City. Stowell took a trip to Portland, Oregon, where Friesen lives, and decided to stay. The two formed a duo in 1976 that recorded and toured prolifically for seven years, with performances in the United States, Canada, Europe and Australia. The duo continues to perform thirty years after their first meeting. In 1983, Stowell and David Friesen joined flutist Paul Horn and Paul's son Robin Horn (on drums) for a tour of the Soviet Union. In 1977 Stowell recorded his debut album Golden Delicious; his sidemen were Jim McNeely, Mike Richmond, and Billy Hart

Stowell teaches internationally. He has been an artist-in-residence at schools in Germany, Indonesia, Argentina, the United States and Canada. He served as assistant director and performer at Oregon Public Broadcasting's PDX Jazz Summit in 1991, and since 1995 has been a contributing columnist for a number of magazines, including Down Beat, Guitar Player, Canadian Musician, Soundcheck (Germany), and Guitar Club (Italy). In Germany, he teaches at Jazz & Rock Schulen Freiburg with Frank Haunschild, with whom he plays regularly. He has also worked with Uwe Kropinski, Dave Liebman, Hiram Mutschler, Gérard Pansanel, Gustavo Assis-Brasil, David Becker, and Nicolao Valiensi. In 2005 he published Jazz Guitar Mastery (book and DVD).

Stowell holds his guitar in a diagonal position, which facilitates playing close, piano-like voicings more comfortably.

== Discography ==
- Golden Delicious (Inner City, 1977)
- Through the Listening Glass with David Friesen (Inner City, 1978)
- Other Mansions with David Friesen (Inner City, 1980)
- Somewhere (Seraphon, 1995)
- Picture in Black and White with Uwe Kropinski (Acoustic Music, 1997)
- Elle (Jardis, 2000)
- Scenes (Origin, 2001)
- The Banff Sessions (Origin, 2002)
- Listen to This with Frank Haunschild (Acoustic Music, 2004)
- Resonance (Origin, 2005)
- Solitary Tales (Origin, 2009)
- Shot Through with Beauty with Michael Zilber (Origin, 2011)
- New York Conversations with Kendra Shank (TCB, 2013)
- Italian Conversation with Michele Campobasso and Viz Maurogiovanni (Terramiamusic, 2014)
- Anytime with Tomas Sauter (Catwalk, 2016)
- Cosmology with Rolf Jardemark (Guitarlandrecords, 2016)
- Night Visitor with Ulf Bandgren (Origin, 2017)
- Petite Fleur with Dave Liebman (Origin, 2018)
- Rain Painting (Origin, 2021)
- 9 Treasures with Kit Garoutte (Kit Garoutte Music, 2023)
