= California Jazz Conservatory =

American private music school

The Jazzschool
- Former name: California Jazz Conservatory
- Motto: Artifices auditoresque alere (Latin)
- Motto in English: Developing artists and audiences
- Type: Private conservatory
- Established: 1997; 29 years ago
- President: Nick Phillips
- Location: Berkeley, California, United States; 37°52′16.6″N 122°16′07.4″W
- Campus: Urban
- Website: jazzschool.org

The Jazzschool at California Jazz Conservatory is a community music school and former private conservatory in Berkeley, California. It was the only independent music conservatory in the United States devoted solely to jazz and related styles of music. Located in the Downtown Berkeley Arts District, the CJC offered Associate, Bachelor's, and Master's degrees in Jazz Studies. The conservatory also offers community education classes and workshops for instrumentalists and vocalists and precollege youth programs for beginning, intermediate and advanced musicians. In July 2024, the conservatory announced that it would end its degree programs due to "significantly decreased enrollment and financial constraints." The degree programs ended after the fall 2024 semester, but community music programs continue under the name Jazzschool.

== History ==
The California Jazz Conservatory was founded in 1997 as "Jazzschool" by Susan Muscarella, a jazz pianist who studied with Wilbert Baranco in the 1970s, joined a band, and released a solo album called Rainflowers in 1979. She first taught at then became the director of the Jazz Ensembles program at the University of California, Berkeley. In 1989 she left the Cal music department for private teaching and professional performance, playing at various times with Sonny Rollins, Sheila E., Marian McPartland, Marlena Shaw and Arturo Sandoval.

In 1997 Muscarella bought an old 1880s residence at 2377 Shattuck Avenue in downtown Berkeley to house the school and a connected cafe called La Note, the latter run by her neighbor, environment designer Dorothée Mitrani-Bell. The California Jazz Conservatory enrolled about 130–150 students in its first quarter, taught by some 25 local jazz musicians and educators. By 2001 the school enrolled 600 students each quarter. The street-level La Note space was used by the California Jazz Conservatory after hours as a classroom and performance space seating 60.

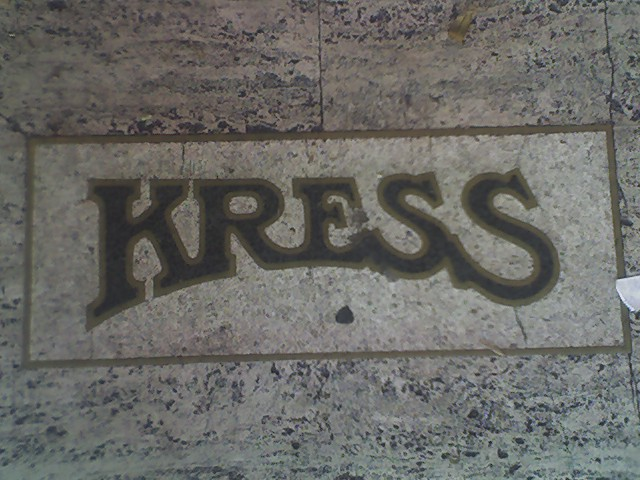
The California Jazz Conservatory is in the 7,500-square-foot (700 m^{2}) basement of Berkeley's historic Kress building

In 2002 to suit its expansion the school moved to larger accommodations a few blocks away at 2087 Addison Street, leaving the cafe to operate separately. The new location—the basement of the historic S. H. Kress & Co. retail store in the middle of the Downtown Berkeley Arts District—was rebuilt to contain 12 rehearsal rooms, 14 classrooms, a 60-seat concert space and a snack shop called Jazzcaffé. The performance space was named Hardymon Hall to memorialize Berkeley High School's dynamic jazz educator Phil Hardymon who founded the Berkeley Jazz Project in 1975 for high school students. In January 2002 the inaugural performance in Hardymon Hall featured singer Madeline Eastman backed by pianist Frank Martin, bassist Peter Barshay and drummer Vince Lateano.

In 2009, the "Jazzschool Institute" began operating under the "Jazzschool" umbrella. The Jazzschool Institute was a four-year music conservatory offering a Bachelor of Music degree to vocalists and instrumentalists. The Jazzschool Institute was superseded by the California Jazz Conservatory in late February 2014.

Susan Muscarella stepped down as president in November 2023 and was replaced by music producer Nick Phillips the next month. In July 2024, the conservatory announced that it would end its degree programs due to "significantly decreased enrollment and financial constraints." The degree programs ended after the fall 2024 semester, but community music programs continue under the name Jazzschool.

== Faculty ==
San Francisco Bay Area musicians who have taught at the California Jazz Conservatory include pianist Taylor Eigsti, vocalist Kim Nalley, violinist and violist Mads Tolling, singer Madeline Eastman, violinist and arranger Jeremy Cohen of Quartet San Francisco, percussionist John Santos of the Machete Ensemble, singer Joe Bagale of Jazz Mafia, percussionist and vocalist Edgardo Cambón of Candela, flugelhornist Dmitri Matheny, saxophonist Anton Schwartz, singer Kellye Gray, saxophonist Michael Zilber, pianist Mark Levine, horn player Ellen Seeling of Isis, and guitarist Mimi Fox.

== Scholarship ==
California Jazz Conservatory students were awarded scholarships such as the Mark Murphy Vocal Jazz Scholarship first given in 2009. Other established endowments included the Jamey Aebersold Scholarship and the William E. Robinson Scholarship. About 15% of the students were assisted financially with a scholarship. In 2012 the Eddie Marshall Scholarship Fund was initiated to memorialize longtime faculty member Eddie Marshall, a drummer who worked at the Keystone Korner jazz club in San Francisco's North Beach where he played behind jazz greats such as Dexter Gordon, Stan Getz and Bobby Hutcherson.

=== Notable students ===
Jazz poet laureate Ishmael Reed enrolled in 1998 at the age of 60 to learn jazz piano. He studied under Muscarella through 2004, and inspired a class for teaching poetry composition intended for music. After his "Jazzschool" term, Reed continued to work with pianist Mary Watkins, and in 2007 as the Ishmael Reed Quintet he produced his debut album called For All We Know on which he leads the band and plays piano.
