= Courtney Fortune =

American singer-songwriter

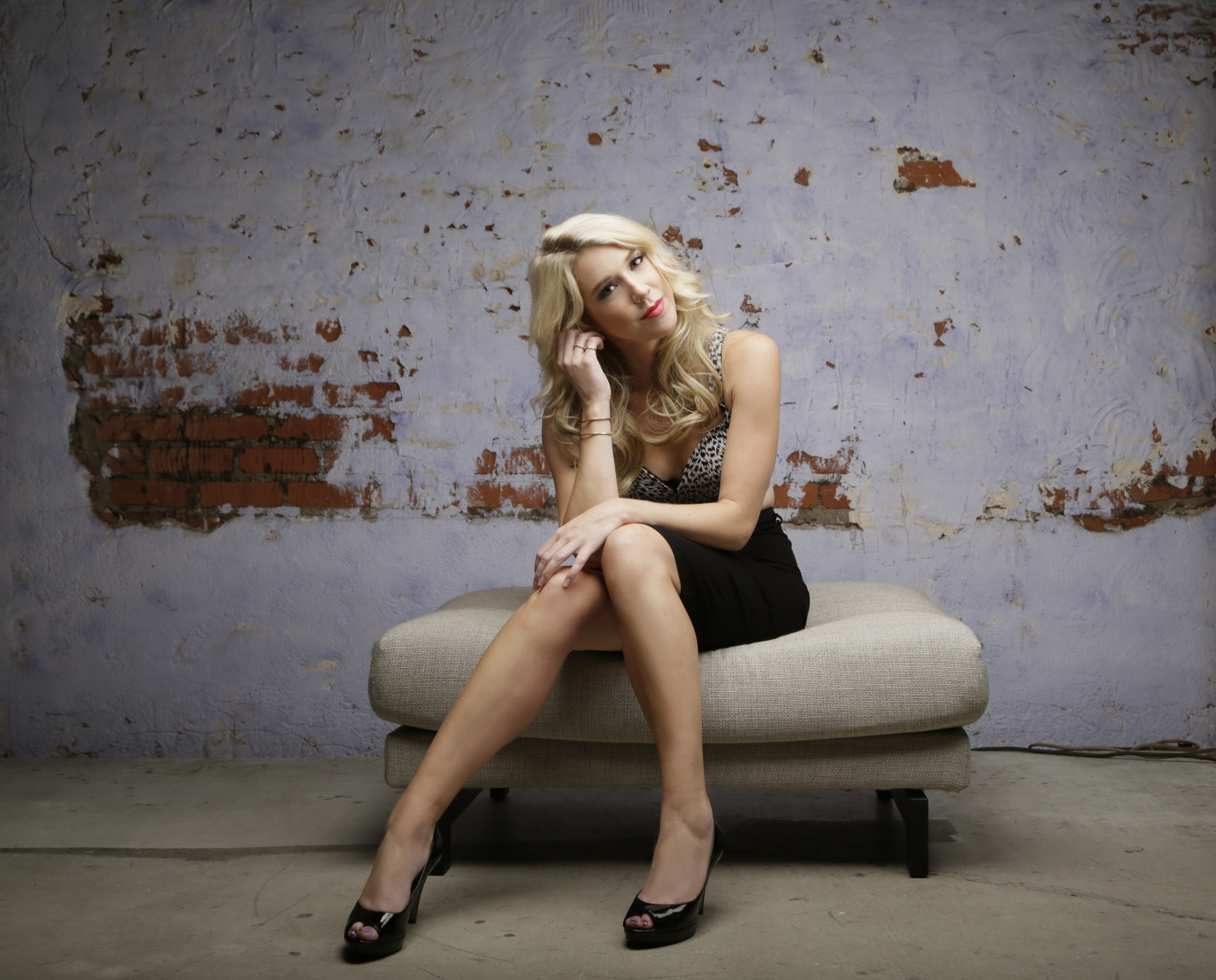

Background information
- Born: Seattle, Washington, U.S.
- Genres: Jazz, pop
- Occupation: Musician
- Labels: Origin
- Website: courtneyfortune.com

Courtney Fortune is an American singer-songwriter from Seattle, Washington.

Fortune is a singer, songwriter, coach and entrepreneur. She has been recognized by the John Lennon Foundation, Glamour and Genlux magazine as "America's Next Big Jazz Singer", and has written and performed songs for Atlantic Records, Universal Music Group, Sony Japan, Disney, Cartoon Network, MTV and ABC. She received the Brian Wilson Musical Achievement Award for her work in the songwriting field and earned her Bachelor of Science degree in Music Industry from the University of Southern California.

Fortune performs with jazz pianist David Benoit and co-hosts the Jazz Eclectic Concert Series, TJE Music Festival and radio hour on 91.5 FM Las Vegas. Her EP You Make It Easy was recorded at Capitol Studios in Los Angeles and produced by Chris Walden.

== Discography ==
- Speak Love (Origin, 2009)
- You Make It Easy (2019)
