= Posi-Tone Records =

- Founded: 1994
- Founder: Marc Free
- Genre: Jazz
- Country of origin: U.S.
- Location: Los Angeles, California
- Official website: www.posi-tone.com

Posi-Tone Records is an American jazz record label founded by Marc Free, a producer and musician who runs the company with engineer Nick O'Toole. The label's first five albums were issued in 1995.

The roster includes trombonist Steve Davis, saxophonist Ralph Bowen, guitarist Ed Cherry, trumpeter David Weiss, Jon Davis, Will Bernard, Brian Charette, Walt Weiskopf, Joe Magnarelli and Michael Dease.

== Roster ==
- David Ake, piano
- Jim Alfredson, organ
- William Ash, guitar, bass
- Ehud Asherie, piano, organ
- David Ashkenazy, drums
- Ernie Banks
- Will Bernard, guitar
- David Binney, alto sax
- M. F. Bird, arranger
- Steve Blackwood, vocals
- Ralph Bowen, tenor sax
- Peter Brendler, bass
- Brent Canter, guitar
- Brian Charette, organ
- Ed Cherry, guitar
- Patrick Cornelius, alto sax
- Jon Davis, piano
- Steve Davis, trombone
- Donald Dean, drums
- Michael Dease, trombone, tenor sax
- Mike DiRubbo, sax
- Benjamin Drazen, sax
- Edwing
- Shauli Einav, sax
- Wayne Escoffery, tenor sax
- John Escreet, piano
- Orrin Evans, piano
- Phil Farris, tenor sax
- Alan Ferber, trombone
- Steve Fidyk, drums, percussion
- Ken Fowser, sax
- Champian Fulton, piano, vocals
- Joe Gaeta, guitar
- David Gibson, trombone
- Behn Gillece, vibraphone
- Jared Gold, organ
- Noah Haidu, piano
- Nick Hempton, alto sax
- Art Hirahara, piano
- Steve Horowitz, bass
- Dave Juarez, guitar
- Josh Lawrence, trumpet
- Sean Lyons, tenor sax
- Joe Magnarelli, trumpet
- Jeremy Manasia, piano
- Sarah Manning, alto sax
- Jacám Manricks, sax
- John Nau, keyboard
- Sean Nowell, sax, clarinet
- Matthew O'Toole, vocals
- Dan Pratt, organ
- Diego Rivera, tenor sax, soprano sax
- Sam Rivers, sax, flute, piano
- Jim Rotondi, trumpet, fluegelhorn
- Idan Santhaus, sax, flute
- Second Wind
- Kenny Shanker, alto sax
- Yotam Silberstein, guitar
- Alexa Tarantino, alto sax
- Smokin' Toads
- Travis Sullivan, alto sax
- Tom Tallitsch, tenor sax
- Doug Webb, sax
- Walt Weiskopf, sax
- David Weiss, trumpet
- Spike Wilner, piano
- Brandon Wright, tenor sax
- Eric Wyatt, tenor sax
- Sam Yahel, piano, organ
- Jordan Young, drums
