= Les DeMerle =

American jazz musician

Lester William DeMerle (born November 4, 1946, Brooklyn) is an American jazz drummer, vocalist, and bandleader.

== Career ==
DeMerle first picked up drums at age ten. He studied drums and percussion with Bob Livingstone in New York from 1960 to 1965, jammed with Lionel Hampton and Gene Krupa when he was 15, and played at the 1964 New York World's Fair. He subsequently studied harmony and music theory from Alf Clausen via mail correspondence, and did freelance work in the late 1960s with Alan Dawson, Lee Castle, and the Jimmy Dorsey Band. In 1967 he formed his own group, Sound 67, with Randy Brecker, Arnie Lawrence, Bill Takus, and Norman Simmons. Near the end of the decade he worked with Joe Farrell and Lee Konitz. DeMerle released an album, Spectrum, on United Artists Records in 1969, which featured Lawrence and Simmons, as well as Marvin Stamm, Frank Foster, and Lew Tabackin as sidemen. He toured with a twelve-piece ensemble in 1970.

He became a member of the Harry James Big Band in 1970 and worked with James until 1982, including at the 1974 Newport Jazz Festival and on his Grammy Award-winning King James Version. In 1971, he moved to Los Angeles, where he played regularly in the late 1970s at the Cellar Theater with his group Transfusion (which included Don Menza on saxophone). Other associations in the 1970s included Michael Brecker, David Benoit, Eric Marienthal, Raul De Souza, the Heath Brothers, and Bunk Gardner. He released Concerts by the Sea album (Bar T) in 1978.

He worked with his wife, singer Bonnie Eisele, in a big band from 1986. They moved to Fernandina Beach, Florida, where DeMerle established the Amelia Island Jazz Festival and played frequently in hotels and on cruise ships. In the 2000s he released a series of albums on Origin Records, the first two of which paid tribute to Blue Note Records.

DeMerle has been noted as a vocalist and is able to sing and play drums at the same time, a rarity among jazz drummers. He has also accompanied many pop and jazz vocalists on drums, including Sammy Davis Jr., Tony Bennett, Eddie Jefferson, Wayne Newton, Frank Sinatra, Mel Tormé, and Sarah Vaughan.

== Discography ==
- Spectrum (United Artists, 1969)
- Concerts by the Sea (Bar T, 1978)
- Transfusion (Dobre, 1978)
- Transcendental Watusi (United National, 1979)
- On Fire (Palo Alto, 1982)
- Spontaneous Combustion (Music Unlimited Productions, 1991?)
- Jazz Party (Music Unlimited, 1993)
- Havin' A Ball (Music Unlimited, 1994)
- You're the Bop: A Jazz Portrait of Cole Porter (Summit, 2000)
- Hittin' the Blue Notes, Volume 1 (Origin, 2003)
- Hittin' the Blue Notes, Volume 2 (Origin, 2004)
- The Jazz Spirit of Christmas (Origin, 2006)
- Cookin' at the Corner, Volume 1 (Origin, 2006)
- Cookin' at the Corner, Volume 2 (Origin, 2007)
- Gypsy Rendezvous, Volume 1 (Origin, 2009)
- Gypsy Rendezvous, Volume 2 (Origin, 2011)
- Feelin' Good (Origin, 2013)
- Comin' Home Baby (Origin, 2016)

== See also ==
- Rare groove
- Jazz
- Blues
