= Marc Seales =

American jazz musician

- Born: July 1954 (age 71–72)
- Origin: Seattle, Washington
- Genres: Jazz; blues; post-bop
- Years active: 1988–present
- Labels: Origin; Challenge
- Member of: New Stories

Marc Seales (born 1954) is an American jazz pianist associated with post-bop. He was a student at Western Washington University, serving his senior year from 1977 to 1978.

== Background ==
As a Professor of Jazz Piano at the University of Washington in Seattle, Seales has worked with Benny Carter, Howard Roberts, Bobby Hutcherson and Art Pepper. His groups include New Stories and the Marc Seales Quartet. Seales won the Earshot Jazz Golden Ear Award for Best Instrumentalist in 1999. His biggest musical influences are the trumpeter Floyd Standifer, and saxophonist Don Lanphere, who were also from Seattle.

An excerpt of his song 'Highway Blues' was included by default in Windows XP, along with Beethoven's 9th Symphony and David Byrne's "Like Humans Do". New Stories had a reunion tour in 2019.

Seales has won numerous Earshot awards, such as Instrumentalist of the Year in 1999 and Acoustic Jazz Group in 2000 and 2001, and was inducted into the Jazz Hall of Fame in 2009.

== Discography ==
=== With New Stories ===
- Circled By Hounds (self-released, 1995)
- Get Happy (Origin, 1996) – with Don Lanphere, Pete Christlieb
- Remember Why (Origin, 1997)
- Speakin' Out (Origin, 1999) – special guest: Ernie Watts
- Home At Last (Origin, 2001) – with Don Lanphere
- Still Life (Origin, 2001) – with Lynn Bush
- Where Do You Start (Origin, 2002) – with Don Lanphere
- Art Of The Groove (Origin, 2003) – with Brent Jensen, Rob Walker
- Hope Is In The Air: The Music Of Elmo Hope (Origin, 2004)

=== With Franklin, Seales, Clover ===
- Two Worlds (A Records/Challenge, 1998)
- Three Worlds (Beezwax, 2000)
- Ears Wide Open (Beezwax, 2001)
- Colemanology (Beezwax, 2004)
- Summer Serenade (Beezwax, 2005)

=== Marc Seales / Marc Seales Band ===
- A Time, A Place, A Journey [live] (Origin, 2004)
- The Paris Suite (self-released, 2008)
- American Songs, Volume 1 (self-released, 2010)
- American Songs, Volume 2: Blues...And Jazz (Origin, 2012 [rel. 2014])
- American Songs, Volume 3: Place & Time (Origin, 2012 [rel. 2015])
