= Mounir Laroussi =

American physicist

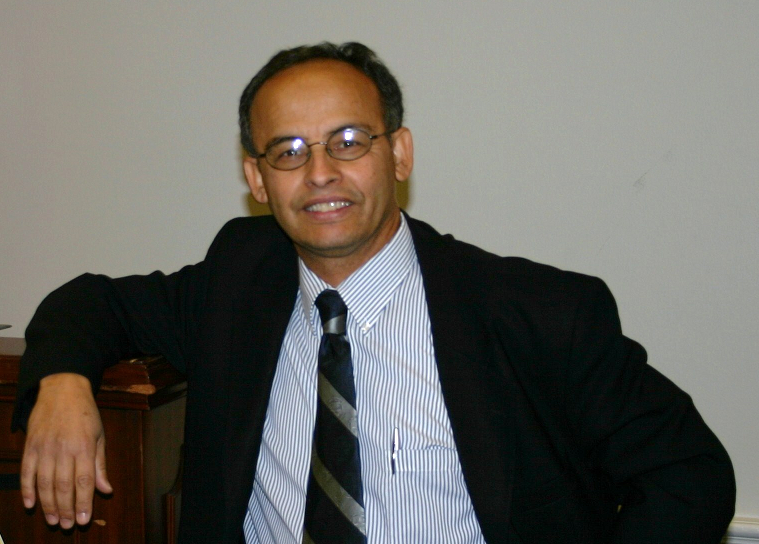
Mounir Laroussi

Mounir Laroussi (born August 9, 1955) is a Tunisian-American scientist. He is known for his work in plasma science, especially low temperature plasmas and their biomedical applications.

== Biography ==
=== Early life ===
Mounir Laroussi was born and raised in Sfax, Tunisia, the son of Habib Laroussi and Manana Jeloul. He is the middle child of three siblings.

=== Education ===
Laroussi attended the Alexander Dumas Elementary School and the Lycee Technique de Sfax (middle school and high school). He received his “Diplome d’Ingenieur” from the Ecole Nationale d’Ingenieurs de Sfax (ENIS) and completed his Master's equivalent thesis in 1981 at the Ecole Nationale Superieure d’ Electronique et de Radioelectricite de Bordeaux (ENSERB) in Bordeaux, France. In 1988, Laroussi received his PhD in electrical engineering from the University of Tennessee.

In 1995, Laroussi joined the Microwave & Plasma Laboratory of the University of Tennessee as a research assistant professor. In 1998, Laroussi joined Old Dominion University as a research associate professor in the Applied Research Center. In 2003, he became an associate professor in the Electrical and Computer Engineering Department at Old Dominion. In 2008, Laroussi was appointed full professor. He is currently a professor at the electrical and computer engineering department of ODU and is the director of ODU’s Laser & Plasma Engineering Institute (LPEI).

=== Academic and scientific career ===
Laroussi's research interests are in the physical electronics area, particularly in the applications of non-equilibrium gaseous discharges. Amongst these are the generation of large volume low temperature plasmas, the interaction of microwaves with plasmas, and the biomedical applications of cold plasmas, a field known as “Plasma Medicine”. In the latter, he published seminal papers on the interaction of low-temperature plasmas with biological cells. In plasma medicine research, low temperature plasmas (or simply cold plasmas) are used to inactivate bacteria and proteins, assist in wound care, destroy some types of cancer cells, and play an active role in various other medical therapies. In 2009 the Institute of Electric and Electronics Engineers (IEEE) elevated Laroussi to Fellow for his contributions to the biomedical applications of plasmas[3].

Laroussi's best-known invention is the plasma pencil. This device can generate long plumes or jets of cold plasmas that can be used in various biomedical applications, including in dentistry. The plasma pencil was the subject of wide media coverage including a mention in an article in National Geographic (February 2006 issue), and ABC online news. It was featured in science/technology shows on the History Channel and the Smithsonian Channel.

Laroussi served as an elected member of the Administrative Committee (2002–2005) and the Plasma Science and Applications Executive Committee (2005–2007) of the IEEE Nuclear and Plasma Sciences Society (NPSS). He has also served as a Guest Editor of the IEEE Transactions on Plasma Science, and of Plasma Processes and Polymers, a Wiley-VCH journal. He serves as an IEEE-NPSS Distinguished Lecturer.

=== Awards ===
- IEEE Millennium Medal, 2000
- Excellence in Research Award from the Batten College of Engineering and Technology, Old Dominion University, May 2005
- Excellence in Teaching Award from the Electrical and Computer Engineering Department, Old Dominion University, June 2006
- Excellence in Innovation Award from the Hampton Road Technology Council, May 2006
- Research Achievement Award, Old Dominion University, May 2009
- Achievement Award, International Society on Plasma Medicine, September 2010
- Fellow of the American Physical Society, 2023

=== Personal ===
In addition to his scientific work, Laroussi writes short stories and is a soccer player and fan. He is fluent in Arabic, French, and English.

== Selected publications ==
- Laroussi, Mounir (1995). "Interaction of microwaves with atmospheric pressure plasmas". International Journal of Infrared and Millimeter Waves. 16 (12). Springer Science and Business Media LLC: 2069–2083. Bibcode:1995IJIMW..16.2069L. doi:10.1007/bf02073410. ISSN 0195-9271. S2CID 122104841.
- Laroussi, M. (1996). "Sterilization of contaminated matter with an atmospheric pressure plasma". IEEE Transactions on Plasma Science. 24 (3). Institute of Electrical and Electronics Engineers (IEEE): 1188–1191. Bibcode:1996ITPS...24.1188L. doi:10.1109/27.533129. ISSN 0093-3813.
- Laroussi, Mounir; Richardson, J. Paul; Dobbs, Fred C. (2002-07-22). "Effects of nonequilibrium atmospheric pressure plasmas on the heterotrophic pathways of bacteria and on their cell morphology". Applied Physics Letters. 81 (4). AIP Publishing: 772–774. Bibcode:2002ApPhL..81..772L. doi:10.1063/1.1494863. ISSN 0003-6951.
- Laroussi, M. (2002). "Nonthermal decontamination of biological media by atmospheric-pressure plasmas: review, analysis, and prospects". IEEE Transactions on Plasma Science. 30 (4). Institute of Electrical and Electronics Engineers (IEEE): 1409–1415. Bibcode:2002ITPS...30.1409L. doi:10.1109/tps.2002.804220. ISSN 0093-3813.
- Laroussi, M; Mendis, D A; Rosenberg, M (2003-04-30). "Plasma interaction with microbes". New Journal of Physics. 5 (1). IOP Publishing: 41. Bibcode:2003NJPh....5...41L. doi:10.1088/1367-2630/5/1/341. ISSN 1367-2630.
- Laroussi, M.; Leipold, F. (2004). "Evaluation of the roles of reactive species, heat, and UV radiation in the inactivation of bacterial cells by air plasmas at atmospheric pressure". International Journal of Mass Spectrometry. 233 (1–3). Elsevier BV: 81–86. Bibcode:2004IJMSp.233...81L. doi:10.1016/j.ijms.2003.11.016. ISSN 1387-3806.
- Laroussi, M.; Lu, X. (2005-09-12). "Room-temperature atmospheric pressure plasma plume for biomedical applications". Applied Physics Letters. 87 (11). AIP Publishing: 113902. Bibcode:2005ApPhL..87k3902L. doi:10.1063/1.2045549. ISSN 0003-6951.
- Laroussi, Mounir; Fridman, Alexander; Satava, Richard M. (2008-08-15). "Editorial: Plasma Medicine". Plasma Processes and Polymers. 5 (6). Wiley: 501–502. doi:10.1002/ppap.200800094. ISSN 1612-8850.
- Laroussi, M. (2009). "Low-Temperature Plasmas for Medicine?". IEEE Transactions on Plasma Science. 37 (6). Institute of Electrical and Electronics Engineers (IEEE): 714–725. Bibcode:2009ITPS...37..714L. doi:10.1109/tps.2009.2017267. ISSN 0093-3813. S2CID 25222156.
- Karakas, Erdinc; Munyanyi, Agatha; Greene, Lesley; Laroussi, Mounir (2010-10-04). "Destruction of α-synuclein based amyloid fibrils by a low temperature plasma jet". Applied Physics Letters. 97 (14). AIP Publishing: 143702. Bibcode:2010ApPhL..97n3702K. doi:10.1063/1.3499277. ISSN 0003-6951.
- Karakas, Erdinc; Laroussi, Mounir (2010-09-15). "Experimental studies on the plasma bullet propagation and its inhibition". Journal of Applied Physics. 108 (6). AIP Publishing: 063305–063305–6. Bibcode:2010JAP...108f3305K. doi:10.1063/1.3483935. ISSN 0021-8979.
