= David Sills =

David Sills may refer to:

- David Sills (judge) (1938–2011), American jurist
- David Sills (American football) (born 1996), American football player
- David Sills IV, founder of Eastern Christian Academy
