= Michael Webster =

Michael or Mike Webster may refer to:

- Mike Webster (1952–2002), American football player
- Mike Webster (Canadian football) (born 1944), Canadian clinical psychologist and former football player

== See also ==
- Micheál Webster (born 1977), Irish hurler and Gaelic footballer
- Michael Riddell-Webster, British Army officer
- Alwyne Michael Webster Whistler (1909–1993), British Army officer
