= Dan Cray =

American jazz pianist (born 1977)

Dan Cray (born September 20, 1977) is an American jazz pianist most associated with Chicago.

== Discography ==
- 2002: Who Cares (Gats Production)
- 2016: Outside In (Origin Records)
