= Thomas Collier =

Thomas or Tom Collier may refer to:

- Thomas Collier (painter) (1840–1891), English landscape painter
- Thomas Collier (Unitarian) (c. 1615–c. 1691), English General Baptist preacher and Arian polemicist
- Tom Collier (musician), percussionist and vibraphonist
- Tom Collier (footballer) (born 1989), Australian rules football player
- Tom Collier, a character in The Animal Kingdom

== See also ==
- Thomas (given name)
- Collier (surname)
