= Laurie Antonioli =

American jazz singer and record producer

- Born: Laurie Antonioli; March 9, 1958; Marin County, California, U.S.
- Genres: Jazz
- Occupations: Singer, record producer, educator
- Instruments: Vocals, guitar
- Years active: 1970s–present
- Website: Official web site

Laurie Antonioli (born March 9, 1958) is an American jazz singer and record producer.

== Early life and education ==
Antonioli was born in Marin County. California. At the age of sixteen she began playing guitar and performing primarily her own original music as well as that of the singer-songwriters of the era. In 1975 she won the American Songwriters Contest for high school students. She studied jazz at Mt. Hood Community College in Gresham, Oregon and Cal State Long Beach. Private teachers included Mark Murphy and Joe Henderson.

== Career ==
After graduation, Antonioli continued composing and performing. In 1980, she toured in Europe for eight months straight with New Orleans saxophonist Pony Poindexter. When Poindexter suffered a stroke, a record date in Paris with pianist Kenny Drew was canceled and they were unable to finish out their tour. Laurie brought Pony back to California where she lived and led her own bands based out of San Francisco.

In 1983 she gave birth to a daughter, which limited her touring and performing. Two years later she signed with Catero Records. Her first album was the "live to two-track" Soul Eyes, with the title song given to her by composer Mal Waldron. She was accompanied by pianist George Cables; the album included jazz standards, original lyrics, and songs by Larry Gelb, and was produced by Bob Parlocha.

After a hiatus from music, she settled in Vienna from 2002 to 2006 and began recording again. Her album Foreign Affair, released on Nabel Records, was a Balkan jazz hybrid recorded in Slovenia with musicians from Serbia, Albania, Germany, and the U.S. It was well received in Europe. Her next album was The Duo Session, also on Nabel, with pianist Richie Beirach. She wrote lyrics to Beirach's compositions and to some Miles Davis tunes and free improvisational pieces. This recording was also well-received but like Foreign Affair was known primarily to European audiences.

Antonioli worked as the Professor of the Vocal Department at KUG University's Jazz Institute in Graz, Austria from 2002 to 2006. and living and performing in Europe, Antonioli was offered a position at the California Jazz Conservatory in Berkeley, California as the school's vocal program director.

She created an eight-semester vocal performance curriculum which was accredited by NASM in 2013. She also released her second American recording in 2010, American Dreams which received critical acclaim.

In 2014 Antonioli released Songs of Shadow, Songs of Light (Origin Records), a tribute to singer-songwriter Joni Mitchell.

== Discography ==
- Soul Eyes (Catero, 1985)
- The Duo Session with Richie Beirach (Nabel, 2005)
- Foreign Affair (Nabel, 2005)
- American Dreams (Intrinsic Music, 2010)
- Songs of Shadow, Songs of Light: The Music of Joni Mitchell (Origin, 2014)
- Varuna (Origin, 2015)
- The Constant Passage of Time (Origin, 2018)
