= Christopher Parker (disambiguation) =

Christopher Parker (born 1983) is an English actor and television presenter.

Christopher Parker, or variants, may also refer to:

== People ==
=== Arts and entertainment ===
- Chris Parker (musician) (born 1950), American jazz drummer
- Chris Parker (comedian) (born 1990), New Zealand comedian
- Chris Parker (radio) (Christopher Parzynski, born 1964), American radio personality
- Chris Parker, English screenwriter and co-creator of the TV series Bedlam (2011 TV series)
- KRS-One (Lawrence "Kris" Parker, born 1965), American rapper

=== Sports ===
- Chris Parker (rugby league) (born 1982), Maltese-English rugby player
- Chris Parker (quarterback) (born 1964), American football player
- Chris Parker (running back) (born 1972), American football player
- Chris Parker (sports administrator), executive director of the National Junior College Athletic Association

== Fictional characters ==
- Chris Parker, in the film Adventures in Babysitting

== See also ==
- Parker (surname)
