= John Moulder =

English cricketer

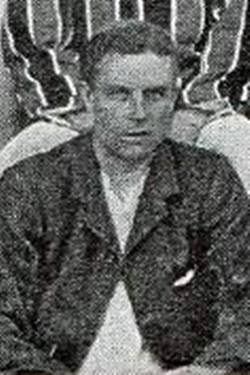
- John Moulder while with Surrey in 1905.

Personal information
- Full name: John Hardie Moulder
- Born: 29 September 1881; Richmond-upon-Thames, England
- Died: 13 October 1933 (aged 52); Parktown, South Africa
- Batting: Right-handed
- Bowling: Right-arm offbreak

Domestic team information
- Years: Team
- 1902–1906: Surrey
- 1904: London County
- 1909/10–1912/13: Transvaal
- FC debut: 29 May 1902 Surrey v Hampshire
- Last FC: 20 March 1913 Transvaal v Griqualand West

Career statistics
Competition	First-class
Matches	36
Runs scored	757
Batting average	16.45
100s/50s	0/1
Top score	70
Balls bowled	700
Wickets	14
Bowling average	29.50
5 wickets in innings	0
10 wickets in match	0
Best bowling	3/33
Catches/stumpings	13/0
- Source: CricketArchive, 12 February 2016
Association football career
- Position: Forward
Senior career*
Years	Team	Apps	(Gls)
1905	Brentford	2	(0)
- * Club domestic league appearances and goals

John Hardie Moulder (29 September 1881 – 13 October 1933) was an English cricketer who played first-class cricket for Surrey, London County and Transvaal between 1902 and 1913. He also played Southern League football for Brentford.
