= Trial of Daniel Dean =

Murder trial in Virginia

The Daniel Dean Trial of Scott County, Virginia was a trial that took place in the town of Estiville, Virginia in July 1877. It was the first time that an individual was convicted of murder in the state of Virginia based solely on circumstantial evidence.

== History ==
On June 25, 1877, Henry Fugate was found shot in the back on his farm while plowing his fields between Nickelsville and Estillville (Gate City) Virginia. He was conscious long enough to tell relatives that he had been shot from the tree line that bordered the field. Although the wound was fatal, he lived for two days, but was unable to be revived. Suspicion fell on a neighbor who lived no more than a half mile away, Daniel Dean. Several months before, he and Fugate had a falling-out, when Fugate and his father were allegedly going to testify in a perjury case against Dean in July. Dean was arrested and subsequently attempted to flee. He was then captured and taken to the Estillville jail to await trial. Because he tried to escape, a number of Dean's neighbors believed him guilty. He was represented by Patrick Hagan, who had named the town of Dungannon, Virginia. Hagan felt that Daniel was innocent and allegedly refused payment.

== Mistrials ==
When Daniel was first tried, the case resulted in a mistrial because one of the jurors believed Daniel to be completely innocent and voted for an acquittal. The second trial resulted in another mistrial due to witnesses allegedly being paid to perjure themselves. The jury in the second trial could not reach a verdict. The court, fearing that the community was starting to take sides, sent for a jury from outside of the county. A jury was selected from Washington County and the case was tried in May 1878, almost a full year later.

== Third trial ==
In the third trial, the prosecution presented several witnesses who testified that Dean told them that Fugate would "get what was coming to him". It was also revealed that Daniel Dean had borrowed a rifle from a neighbor named Francisco. Dean's own rifle was left at the Cleek Store (a gun shop at the time) in Estiville for repairs. The rifle that Dean borrowed was a large-bored rifle with a square barrel. This rifle would prove in court to be Dean's undoing. Police officers at that time examined where they believed the shot came from, and located what seemed to be a square indentation on a rail. Police felt that the shooter sat on the ground behind a bush, and rested the rifle on the fence rail to steady his aim. When the murderer fired the rifle it obviously jumped leaving the indentation. When the Francisco gun was placed on this indentation, it matched. The bullet pulled from Fugate's body had a similar weight to the bullet that the Francisco gun fired. When this gun was sent for by court officials, Dean swore that it would not shoot, because the trigger wouldn't stay cocked. Examination of the rifle proved that Dean had fired it and that the trigger was recently tampered with. Dean's two boys testified on his behalf. Both boys swore that they were with their father on Monday morning when Fugate was shot, and therefore he couldn't possibly be the murderer.

=== Verdict ===
All of the evidence that prosecutors presented was circumstantial. They said that Dean was within the area at the right time and the right place. Also, he had the means, opportunity, and reason to commit the deed. On top of that he tried to escape. Patrick Hagan did everything that he could to save Daniel Dean. He gave an eight-hour speech in defense of Daniel, but to no avail. Dean was convicted on circumstantial evidence. When the sentence was handed down that Daniel was guilty, Patrick Hagan appealed it to the Virginia Supreme Court.

== Appeal ==
The high court upheld the ruling of the county court and based Dean's conviction solely on circumstantial evidence. Patrick Hagan swore to the court to never be part of another criminal trial for the remainder of his life. J.R. Wilhelm, the juror from the first trial that voted for an acquittal, was now the county sheriff. He was given the order to carry out Daniel Dean's hanging, and he felt that Dean was innocent.

== Controversy and public opinion ==
Half of the community did as well. Legend has it that he offered a deputy $300 if he would hang Daniel Dean. The deputy refused, believing that Dean was innocent as well. Wilhelm was distraught with the thought of hanging an innocent man. From the start, things went wrong. Rather than use a scaffold, the town chose to use a tree to carry out the sentence, so they could save money. The community was now so divided over the ruling that they began to fight among themselves. When a rumor spread that several townspeople were going to break Daniel Dean out of jail, a mob formed and stormed the jail, allegedly hoping to hang Dean earlier than planned. Both sides took up arms.

== Legend and sentencing ==
During the hanging, Daniel Dean resisted. The crowd was also in an uproar because of the divisions the trial created. Scott County borrowed extra deputies from Washington County to keep the crowd back. Dean professed his innocence right up to the moment that he was hanged. He was made to stand in the back of a wagon with a team of horses. Wilhelm stood with him in the wagon until the noose was around his neck. Dean sobbed as the minister read him his last rites, begging them not to do it. Then suddenly without warning Wilhelm jumped from the wagon into the driver's seat, grabbed the reins, and slapped the team of horses connected to the wagon. They lurched forward, killing Dean. Wilhelm was so mad that before they could cut Dean down, he turned on the crowd. As tears of anger came from his eyes, he shouted that the town was filled with nothing but "Yankee Demons from Hell", and that God would destroy them all. This comment would later be known as "The Curse of Estillville". This would later result in the town changing its name. Some say that Wilhelm immediately left town and was never seen again; and that the office of sheriff remained vacant for over a year. Others say that he remained on, resigning in June 1880.
