= Randy Halberstadt =

American jazz musician

Randy Halberstadt (born May 1, 1953) is an American jazz pianist, composer, recording artist, author, and teacher. In addition to leading his own trio and quintet and producing his own recordings (Inner Voice, Clockwork, Parallel Tracks, Flash Point), he has performed with Herb Ellis, Buddy DeFranco, Nick Brignola, Terry Gibbs, Slide Hampton, Pete Christlieb, Bobby Shew, Joe LaBarbera, Lanny Morgan, David Friesen, Kim Richmond, Don Lanphere, Jiggs Whigham, Roswell Rudd, Jack Walrath, Gary Smulyan, Julian Priester, Mel Brown, and many others. In 2004, Randy recorded with Bay area guitarist Mimi Fox and the Ray Drummond on bass.

Randy wrote Metaphors for the Musician (2001), a collection of jazz theory and secrets gleaned from 25 years as a teacher and performer.

Randy is a professor of Jazz Theory at Cornish College of the Arts. He teaches theory, ear training, jazz piano, and vocal jazz.

He was born in New York, New York.

== Selected discography ==
- Inner Voice (1991)
- Clockwork (Pony Boy Records, 1995)
- Parallel Tracks (Origin Records, 2004)
- Flash Point (Origin Records, 2010)
- Open Heart (Origin Records, 2018)

Also featured on:

- Here in the Moment (2010) with Gail Pettis
- Well Alright (2008) with Nancy Kelly
- May I Come In (2007) with Gail Pettis
- She's The Woman (2004) with Bay Area guitarist Mimi Fox
- Greta Matassa: All This and Heaven Too: Live at Bake’s Place (2001)
- Greta Matassa and Mimi Fox: Two for the Road (2003)
- So Many Stars (2000) with Janis Mann
- Lost In His Arms (1999) with Janis Mann
- A Little Moonlight (1997) with Janis Mann
- Circle Dancing (1997) with Jay Clayton
- Indigenous Groove (1995) with the Clarence Acox Sextet
- Joanna's Dance (1991) with the Clarence Acox Sextet
