= Dan McCarthy (vibraphonist) =

Canadian jazz vibraphone player

- Genres: Jazz
- Occupation: Instrumentalist
- Instrument: Vibraphone
- Website: www.vibraphonedan.com

Dan McCarthy is a Canadian jazz vibraphone player living in Brooklyn, New York.

== Early life ==
McCarthy studied with Don Thompson at Humber College before moving to New York City in 2009.

== Career ==
McCarthy has performed or recorded with Steve Swallow, Ben Monder, Mark Feldman, Don Thompson, Pat LaBarbera, Ingrid Jensen, Myron Walden, Robin Eubanks, Jeremy Steig, Terry Clarke, among others. With Ralph Turek, McCarthy has authored textbooks on music theory.

== Discography ==
- Interwords, 2006, independent, with Matt Wigton (bass), Greg Ritchie (drums), Myron Walden (saxophones)
- Let's Start the Show, 2009, independent, with Tuey Connell (banjo), Dan Loomis (bass), Freed Kennedy (drums)
- Constellation, 2008, independent, with Gordon Webster (piano)
- Méjis, 2018, independent, with Randy Ingram (piano), Michael Bates (bass), and Jeff Davis (drums)
