= Bruce Williamson =

Bruce Williamson may refer to:

- Bruce D. Williamson (born 1947), American politician, Minnesota state representative
- Bruce Williamson (businessman), American energy company executive
- Bruce Williamson (politician), American politician, Georgia state representative
- Bruce Williamson (singer) (1970–2020), American R&B and soul singer
- Bruce Williamson (diplomat), American diplomat
- Bruce Williamson (saxophonist) (born 1951), American jazz saxophonist

== See also ==
- John Bruce Williamson (1859–1938), barrister, historian and writer
