= Dana Hall =

Dana Hall may refer to:

- Dana Hall (American football)
- Dana Hall (musician)

== See also ==
- Dana Hall School, an independent school in Wellesley, Massachusetts
