= Marlene Rosenberg =

American plasma physicist

Marlene Rosenberg is an American plasma physicist known for her work on cosmic and interplanetary dusty plasma.

== Education and career ==
Rosenberg earned a Ph.D. in astronomy at Harvard University in 1976, under the supervision of Gabor J. Kalman; her dissertation was Waves and instabilities in plasmas in pulsar atmospheres.

After working on nuclear fusion in industry at General Atomics and Jaycor, in San Diego, California, she became a research scientist in electrical and computer engineering at the University of California, San Diego (UCSD), in the early 1990s, affiliated with the UCSD Center for Astrophysics and Space Sciences.

== Research contributions and recognition ==
In 2000, Rosenberg was named a Fellow of the American Physical Society (APS), after a nomination from the APS Division of Plasma Physics, "for pioneering contributions to the theory of dusty plasmas, especially related to strong coupling effects and the role of instabilities".

A 2003 paper by Rosenberg in the New Journal of Physics, "Plasma interaction with microbes" with Mounir Laroussi and D. A. Mendis, concerned "the germ-killing potential of cold plasmas"; in 2007 it was named one of the most significant articles from the journal over the previous decade.

She has also been one of the researchers on the Plasmakristall-4 (PK-4) plasma experiment, carried out beginning in 2017 on the International Space Station.
