= Hugo Fernandez (guitarist) =

Jazz guitarist (b. 1971)

- Born: September 25, 1971 (age 54); Mexico City, Mexico
- Genres: Jazz, jazz fusion
- Occupations: Musician, composer
- Instrument: Guitar
- Years active: 1990–present
- Label: Origin
- Website: hugofernandez.net

Hugo Fernandez is a Mexican jazz guitarist based in Berlin, Germany.

== Education ==
At the age of 18 he began to work professionally as a guitarist for Mexican pop artists. At the age of 23, he travelled to Boston to study at Berklee College of Music, where he graduated with honors in 1998. During his time in Boston, he had lessons with renowned jazz educators such as: Jerry Bergonzi, Hal Crook, Ed Tomassi and Jamey Haddad. In that period he coincided there with the musicians Antonio Sanchez, Anat Cohen, Avishai Cohen, Miguel Zenon, Lage Lund, among others. In 1999 he returned to Mexico City and began teaching at the Academia de Musica Fermatta affiliated with the Berklee College of Music network. In 2003 he moved to New Orleans to study a master's degree in jazz studies under the tutelage of Steve Masakowski and Ed Petersen.

== Career ==
In 2001 the Hugo Fernández Quartet was formed, having its first important concert in 2001 in the cycle "Cinco de Jazz" of the "Sala Ollin Yolitzli" with Pablo Prieto (drums), Luri Molina (double bass) and Sergio Galván (alto sax).

In the early years, this group was looking for the sound of bebop and played a jazz standard repertoire with arrangements by Fernandez. They were then invited to the International Guitar Festival of the CNA (2002) and opened the concert for Antonio Sanchez at the Teatro de la Ciudad (2003). Fernandez also collaborated with jazz musicians in Mexico City such as Magos Herrera, Omar Aran, Alex Kautz, Iraida Noriega, Joe D'Etienne, Israel Cupich, Miguel Villicaña, and Gabriel Puentes.

In 2006 he traveled to Madrid where he lived for 12 years. In Spain he collaborated with Cordelia, a Sevillian group led by singer and actress Lola Botello, where jazz, Latin American music, and literature converged. In their seven years together, they performed several concerts and recorded their album Solitude.

With Celia Mur, a singer from Granada, he recorded Amerikanda mixing Latin American folk music with jazz and flamenco.

In 2013 he recorded Origenes, his first album as a leader, with Ariel Bringuez (saxophones), Ander Garcia (double bass), and Mariano Steinberg (drums). Fernandez was invited to close the jazz cycle "Por lo tanto Jazz" at the Palacio de Bellas Artes in Mexico City. In this period the quartet made several tours in Mexico and Spain.

Their next album, Cosmogram included Antonio Sanchez, Antonio Miguel on double bass, and Ariel Bringuez on saxophone. DownBeat magazine named it one of the best albums of 2016.

In September 2018 he recorded Naualli with Julian Sanchez (trumpet), Arie(saxophone), Tomas Merlo (bass guitar), and Marc Miralta (drums). The band combines classical music, pop rock, and world music and includes arrangements by Mexican composers to interpret this music in a jazz context.

Navegantes reunites five authors with different stylistic perspectives. They share authorship to propitiate a unity in their sound.

He has performed at Festival Internacional Cervantino, Mexico City Historic Centre Festival, Palacio de Bellas Artes, Jazz-MX Festival, Circulo de Bellas Artes (Madrid), Madrid Jazz Festival, Granada Jazz Festival, University of Seville Jazz Festival, Jazz en el Centro (Gijón), JazzFermin (Pamplona), Guatemala International Guitar Festival, among others.

== Discography ==
- Solitude (2011) with Cordelia
- Amerikanda (2012) with Celia Mur
- Origenes (self produced, 2012)
- Cosmogram (Origin 2015)
- Naualli (self produced, 2018)
