= Susan Reed =

Susan Reed may refer to:

- Susan Reed (district attorney) (born 1950), former district attorney of Bexar County, Texas, U.S.
- Susan Reed (singer) (1926–2010), American singer, harpist, zitherist and actor
- Susan Reed, swimmer at synchronised swimming at the 1986 World Aquatics Championships
- Susan Reid, the birth name of Filipino actress Hilda Koronel
- Susan Phillips Read, American judge
