= Douglas Miller =

Douglas Miller may refer to:

== Politics ==
- Douglas Miller (Alberta politician) (1904–1982), Canadian politician from Alberta
- Douglas Miller (Indiana politician), American politician of the Indiana House of Representatives
- Doug Miller (Texas politician) (born 1954), American politician of the Texas House of Representatives
- Doug Miller (Oklahoma politician) (born 1955), American politician of the Oklahoma House of Representatives

== Others ==
- Douglas Miller (musician) (1949–2021), American gospel musician
- Douglas Miller (surgeon) (1937–1995) Scottish neurosurgeon
- Doug Miller (musician), member of Crazy Town
- Doug Miller (soccer) (born 1969), American soccer player and youth coach
- Doug Miller (American football) (1969–1998), American football linebacker
- Doug Miller (racing driver), American stock car racing driver

== See also ==
- Robbie Douglas-Miller, Baron Douglas-Miller (born 1965), British politician
