= Tom Tallitsch =

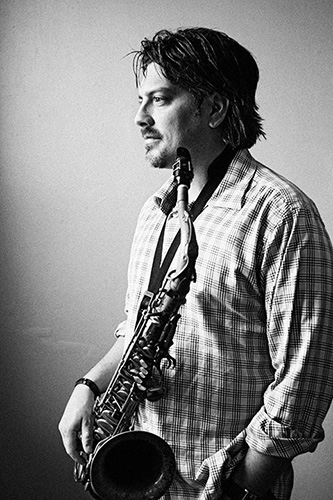

Background information
- Genres: Jazz
- Occupation: Musician
- Instrument: Tenor Saxophone
- Label: Posi-Tone
- Website: www.tomtallitsch.com

Tom Tallitsch is an American jazz saxophonist. He is also a composer, and music educator. His most recent recording is All Together Now (Posi-Tone, 2015).

== Performing ==
Tallitsch has performed as a jazz saxophonist for over 25 years (bandleader/composer and sideman) throughout the United States, Europe, and South America. He performs regularly at concert venues and jazz clubs primarily in New York City including Birdland, the Sidedoor Jazz Club, Smalls, Fat Cat, Garage, Tomi Caffe Vivaldi, Shrine, 55 Bar, Something Jazz Club, Puppets, Smoke, New Jersey jazz venues including Trumpets, Shanghai Jazz, the West Windsor Arts Council, the Arts Council of Princeton, the Grounds For Sculpture and Philadelphia, Pennsylvania jazz venues like Ortleibs, Chris's Jazz Cafe, the Philadelphia Museum of Art, Zanzibar Blue, the Philadelphia Jazz Festival, and the Reading Jazz Festival. He has been the opening Jazz artist at the annual Pork Roll Festivals in Trenton, New Jersey. Tallitsch has been the host of The Modern Jazz Radio Show on the Mercer County Community College jazz station.

== Compositions and recordings ==
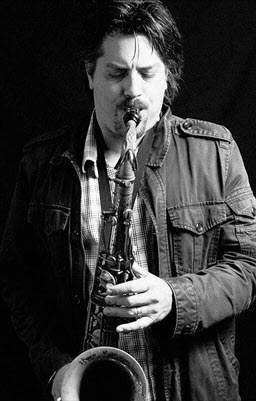

Tallitsch has released six albums of original compositions including works on Posi-Tone Records and Origin Records. His fifth album for Posi-Tone, "All Together Now" was recorded in New York City in 2014 and released in April 2015. Tallitsch has published over 100 original jazz compositions and arrangements for small ensembles, which are regularly played on terrestrial and internet radio stations throughout the world, and by student jazz ensembles including Stony Brook University.

Tallitsch's compositions include improvisational, written, and recorded music for dance. His works have been used by dancers from the Martha Graham Dance Company at The Martha Graham Choreographer showcase "Lookout" 2000.

== Discography ==
- Duality (2005)
- Perspective (2008)
- Medicine Man (2009 Origin/OA2)
- Heads or Tales (2012 Posi-Tone)
- All Together Now (Posi-Tone, 2015)
