= Andrea Brachfeld =

- Born: Andrea Brachfeld; Utica , New York
- Genres: Jazz, Latin jazz
- Occupations: Musician, composer, educator, arranger, business owner
- Instruments: Flute, alto flute, vocals
- Years active: 1970s–present
- Labels: Spirit Nectar, Latin Cool, Zoho Music, Consolidated Artists, Jazzheads, Origin Records, Pacific Coast Jazz
- Website: www.andreabrachfeld.com

Andrea Brachfeld (born May 3, in Utica, NY) is an American jazz and Latin jazz flutist.

Brachfeld , flutist, vocalist, composer, arranger, producer, educator, and business owner, attended The High School of Music and Art and the Manhattan School of Music. She had her first professional performance at the age of 16. In 1974, she received the Louis Armstrong Award for outstanding Jazz student. She studied with Hubert Laws, Jimmy Heath, George Coleman, and Eddie Daniels. Some of the many artists she has associated with include Tito Puente, Hubert Laws, Paquito D'Rivera, Stanley Jordon, Slide Hampton, Wallace Roney, Wycliffe Gordon, Ray Barreto, Dave Valentin, Oscar Hernandez , Joe Newman, Nestor Torres, Kenwood Dennard, Hilton Ruiz and Bill O' Connell, among many others.

Her breakthrough in Charanga music, came when she became flutist for the Latin band Charanga '76.She was the first woman in the USA to play this music.

She received the "Chico O'Farrill Lifetime Acheivement Award" from Latin Jazz USA in 2006. In 2010, she received the "Pionero Award " for her contribution to Latin music. In 2012 she received the "Tribute to the Charanga Flutes award" given by the Charanga Legends USA. In 2015 she was awarded the "Best Jazz Flute" award by Hot House Magazine. She received the New Jazz Grant from Chamber Music America in 2017 and the Presenter's Consortium award in 2020.

Andrea has recorded 12 projects , as a leader, with the most recent "A Holiday Celebration of Light" coming out on November 16, 2026 on the Pacific Coast Jazz label featuring Wycliffe Gordon.

== Discography ==
- Andrea (Latina Records, 1978)
- Remembered Dreams (Spirit Nectar, 2001)
- Back With Sweet Passion (Latin Cool, 2003)
- Beyond Standards with Chembo Corniel (Consolidated Artists, 2006)
- Into the World: A Musical Offering (Shaneye, 2008)
- Songs from the Divine (Shaneye, 2009)
- Lady of the Island (Zoho, 2012)
- Lotus Blossom (Jazzheads, 2015)
- If Not Now, When? (Jazzheads, 2018)
- Brazilian Whispers (Origin, 2020)
- Evolution (Origin, 2022)
- A Holiday Celebration of Light ( Pacific Coast Jazz, 2026)
