= Daniel Barry =

Daniel Barry may refer to:

- Dan Barry (cartoonist) (1923–1997), Flash Gordon comic strip artist
- Dan Barry (reporter) (born 1958), reporter for The New York Times
- Daniel T. Barry (born 1953), retired astronaut and Survivor: Panama contestant
- Dan Barry (umpire) (1886–1947), American baseball umpire
