= Peter Lin =

Peter Lin may refer to:

- Peter H. Lin, American surgeon
- Peter Lin (bishop) (born 1967), Australian Anglican bishop
- Lin Chin-hsing (born 1953), Taiwanese politician
- Lin Pin-kuan (born 1948), Taiwanese politician
- Peter Lim (born 1953), Singaporean businessman
- Peter Lim Swee Guan (c. 1947–1975), participant in the Gold Bars triple murders
