= Joel Miller =

Joel Miller may refer to:

- Joel M. Miller (born 1943), American politician in the New York State Assembly
- Joel Miller (racing driver) (born 1988), American auto racing driver
- Joel McKinnon Miller (born 1960), American film and television actor
- Joel A. Miller (born 1977), writer, producer, and director
- Joel Miller (volleyball) (born 1988), British volleyball player
- Joel (The Last of Us) (Joel Miller), protagonist of The Last of Us video game
