= Mimi Fox =

American jazz guitarist and educator

- Born: August 24, 1956 (age 69); Queens, New York, U.S.
- Genres: Jazz
- Occupation: Musician
- Instrument: Guitar
- Years active: 1970s–present
- Labels: Origin, Favored Nations
- Website: mimifoxguitar.com

Mimi Fox is an American jazz guitarist and educator.

== Career ==
Fox's mother was a jazz singer and her father owned a large record collection that she heard from an early age. After watching the Monkees and the Beatles, she became interested in guitar at the age of ten. She taught herself to play by listening to the Beatles album Rubber Soul. In her teens, she played drums at school. Her professional career began at the age of seventeen when she performed in the lounge of a Chinese restaurant.

In the late 1970s, she moved to California and took lessons from guitarist Bruce Forman, which she has called the turning point in her career. Joe Pass became her friend and mentor.

Fox has taught at Yale University, Berklee College of Music, New York University, and has led the guitar department at California Jazz Conservatory. She has worked with guitarists Charlie Byrd, Kenny Burrell, Jim Hall, and Martin Taylor and with Joey DeFrancesco, Branford Marsalis, Houston Person, David Sanchez, and Lonnie Smith.

== Discography ==
- Against the Grain (Catero, 1985)
- Mimi Fox Live (Tusco, 1993)
- Turtle Logic (Monarch, 1995)
- Kicks (Monarch, 1999)
- Standards (Origin, 2001)
- Two for the Road with Greta Matassa (Origin, 2003)
- She's the Woman (Favored Nations, 2004)
- Soul Eyes with Bruce Arnold (Muse-eek, 2005)
- Perpetually Hip (Favored Nations, 2006)
- Live at the Palladium (Favored Nations, 2011)
- Standards, Old and New (Origin, 2013)
- May I Introduce to You with San Francisco String Trio (Ridgeway, 2017)
- This Bird Still Flies (Origin, 2019)
- One For Wes Mimi Fox Organ Trio for Wes (2023)
