= Bill Anschell =

American jazz pianist and composer

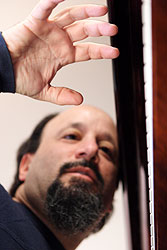
- Bill Anschell, at piano, from below

Background information
- Origin: Seattle, Washington, US
- Genre: Jazz
- Occupations: Musician, composer, musical director, band leader, arranger, writer
- Instrument: Piano
- Years active: 1982–present
- Labels: Summit Records, LoveCat Music, Origin Records
- Website: BillAnschell.com

Bill Anschell is a jazz pianist and composer. He has recorded seven CDs as a leader, and performed or recorded with many jazz greats. His original compositions and piano work are prominently featured on Freelon's Grammy Award-nominated recording Shaking Free (Concord Records) and her CBS recordings Heritage and Listen. His own CDs have received extensive national airplay and critical acclaim. His compositions have appeared in many films and television series, including "The West Wing," "The Wire," "Bloodline," and "NCIS: LA."

== Performances ==
Anschell has performed in jazz festivals and clubs throughout the United States and abroad, leading his band, the Bill Anschell Trio, and as pianist, composer and musical director for vocalist Nnenna Freelon and others. His concert credits include seven European tours and eight South American tours, in top international festivals ranging from the Nice Jazz Festival in France to the North Sea Jazz Festival in the Netherlands. Anschell has performed thousands of concerts in the United States, from the Monterey Jazz Festival in California to the Kennedy Center for the Performing Arts in Washington, D.C. His performances have been widely broadcast on radio and television including National Public Radio's JazzSet, hosted by Branford Marsalis.

== Background ==
Anschell grew up in the Seattle area and graduated from Mercer Island High School. He attended Oberlin College and Wesleyan University and graduated Phi Beta Kappa with a music degree from Wesleyan in 1982. At Wesleyan, he studied composition privately with Bill Barron; and South Indian rhythmic theory with T. Ranganathan. He later spent three years in Madison, Wisconsin, where he worked with bassist Richard Davis.

From 1989 to 2002 Anschell was based out of Atlanta. During his first three years there he served as Jazz Coordinator for the Southern Arts Federation, creating a host of regional projects including JazzSouth, a syndicated radio program broadcast on more than 200 stations around the world. Anschell left the SAF Jazz Coordinator post in 1992 to focus on his performing and composing career, but continued to produce JazzSouth through 2002. From 1992 to 2002, Anschell's trio appeared in events across the Southeast, including the 1996 Summer Olympic Games, the Atlanta Jazz Festival, and Piccolo Spoleto. In 2001, he was selected by the American Composers Forum for its "Composer-in-the-Schools" program; his residency included a commissioned piece for chamber orchestra.

In 2002 Anschell moved from Atlanta to Seattle, Washington where he performs with other resident artists and visiting jazz musicians. In February 2006 he won the "Northwest Jazz Instrumentalist of the Year" Golden Ear Award (Earshot Jazz), and in January 2007 his trio received a Golden Ear as the "Northwest Acoustic Jazz Ensemble of the Year". In January 2011 he was again named "Northwest Jazz Instrumentalist of the Year"; 2012 saw him winning "Northwest Jazz Instrumentalist of the Year" for a third time, and his solo piano CD, Figments, was named "Northwest Jazz Recording of the Year". In 2016 he was inducted into the Seattle Jazz Hall of Fame.

== Original compositions and recordings ==
Anschell released his debut album, Rhythm Changes, in 1995 (Consolidated Artists Productions), and was praised by reviewers for his composing, arranging, and piano playing on the disc. He appeared as the featured artist in the December, 1997 issue of Jazz Player magazine, which included a "play-along" CD of his original music.

Anschell's follow-up album, A Different Note All Together, was released in 1998 by Accurate Records. The album spent eight weeks in the top 50 for jazz airplay nationally, and was named by United Press International (UPI) as one of the "10 Best" jazz releases of the year.

Anschell's 2001 album, When Cooler Heads Prevail (Summit Records) is the first recording to feature him exclusively in the trio format. It spent eleven weeks on the national radio airplay charts.

More to the Ear Than Meets the Eye was released October 17, 2006 by Origin Records and was chosen by numerous critics and radio stations across the country for their "10 Best of 2006" lists.

We Couldn't Agree More, a July 2009 duo release with Idaho saxophonist Brent Jensen, "comes with about as high a recommendation as I can give an album," according to jazz critic Chris Robinson. and received a year-end "Critics Choice" award from Jazziz magazine.

Figments, Anschell's 2011 solo piano CD, featured abstract takes on a mixture of jazz standards and pop songs from the 1970s. Describing the project, allaboutjazz.com critic Dan McClenaghan wrote "Anschell stretches and bends the familiar melodies to near-breaking point, in turns ruminative, playful, dark, and sparkling... Figments: Bill Anschell alone and letting go, taking a risk that pays off nicely." Figments received an Earshot Golden Ear Award as the "Northwest Jazz Recording of the Year".

In 2013, Anschell ventured into a new musical arena, producing a CD of all-electronic music. Impulses contained ten original compositions, plus covers of "Mustang Sally" and Coltrane's "Naima." He continues to produce original electronica along with his jazz projects.

2016 saw the release of Rumbler, Anschell's first ensemble CD in eleven years. In his review for JazzTimes, Thomas Conrad wrote "Bill Anschell would be a badass wherever he lived, even Greenwich Village. He is an impeccable, distinctive pianist with a valuable body of work on Seattle's Origin label." Among many other positive reviews, Rumbler received four stars in downbeat.

The following year Anschell released Shifting Standards, an impromptu set of jazz standards played by his working trio with bassist Jeff Johnson and drummer D'Vonne Lewis. Earshot Jazz's review Ian Gwin described it as "an incredible craftsmanship of rhythm and harmony, body and soul...Anschell’s harmonic depth, as on the ballad 'Some Other Time,' is heartbreaking, and counterpoint, as on 'Con Alma,' stunning."

== Publishing, radio, and TV works ==
Anschell is also widely known for his work as a writer, producer and humorist. He has written reviews and feature articles for numerous arts periodicals and is the author of two books: Jazz in the Concert Setting, published by the Association of Performing Arts Presenters; and a manual for jazz grant-writing, Who Can I Turn To?, published by the Southern Arts Federation (SAF; now renamed South Arts). While at SAF, he created and produced JazzSouth, an innovative radio program broadcast from 1992 to 2002 on more than 200 stations internationally.

Many of Anschell's satirical jazz pieces have gone viral on the internet. "Careers in Jazz" is the all-time most-read story on leading jazz website allaboutjazz.com with more than 300,000 hits; it has been translated and posted in multiple languages, and was the centerpiece of an article in the Wall Street Journal. In 2014 he was a recipient of the inaugural Paul Desmond Award, allaboutjazz.com's celebration of the funniest jazz artists.

His musical compositions, many of which are published by LoveCat Music, have been heard on numerous network and cable programs, including NBC's The West Wing, FX's Damages, HBO's The Wire, CBS'sThe Defenders, NCIS: LA, The Mindy Project and HBO's Bessie Smith biopic, Bessie.
