= Erik Jekabson =

- Born: March 23, 1973 (age 52); Berkeley, California
- Genres: Jazz, post-bop, third stream
- Instrument(s): Trumpet, flugelhorn

Erik Jekabson (born March 23, 1973) is an American jazz trumpeter and flugelhorn player. A Bay Area-based musician, he is known for the jazz group The Electric Squeezebox Orchestra, which he leads. He is also a composer and arranger.

== Biography ==
Jekabson graduated from the San Francisco Conservatory of Music in 2006, having already studied at the Oberlin Conservatory of Music and having toured in Japan in the 1990s. While in New Orleans from 1994 to 1998 he played with Kermit Ruffins, Eddy Louiss, and the jam band Galactic. While enrolled at the San Francisco Conservatory of Music, he toured with guitarist and singer John Mayer.

While in New York City, he performed with jazz saxophonist Illinois Jacquet; on TV he has played on the Tonight Show with Jay Leno and Late Night with David Letterman.

In 2022, he co-released an album with pianist Art Lande, The Silver Fox, in the Arterik Quartet, which was recorded at a live concert in Berkeley in 2012. The album included two discs, each disc including the compositions of one of the co-leaders. The same year he released Anti-Mass, recorded in 2011 with the String-tet chamber group, including Dayna Stephens. Jazz critic Matt Collar noted that, "while the nature of a string-based ensemble naturally encourages a ruminative, classically oriented sound, Anti-Mass is at its core a jazz album," comparing its style to the Gil Evans/Miles Davis collaborations of the early Third Stream era. The album was inspired by the De Young Museum, who commissioned Jekabson to write music for a sculpture in its gallery. Another recording in 2011, a live performance at the Hillside Club with percussionist John Santos, was released in 2014 as the album Live at the Hillside Club.

In 2020, he released One Note at a Time by the Erik Jekabson Sextet III, his eighth album as leader. Also on the album were saxophonist Dave Ellis, guitarist Dave MacNab, bassist John Wiitala, drummer David Flores, and John Santos. Roger Farbey of Jazz Journal described the album as achieving a "consistently high level of musicianship" throughout its contrasting themes. The Mercury News noted the album "The Last Days of Studio A" (2021) with Jekabson on trumpet as one of the "favorite 2021 releases by Bay Area artists," having been recorded shortly before the closure of Fantasy Studios.

Jekabson has performed tributes to former jazz trumpeters, including Chet Baker and Clifford Brown.

== Discography ==
=== As leader ===
- Intersection (2004, Fresh Sound, New Talent)
- Crescent Boulevard (2010, Jekab's Music)
- Anti-Mass (2012, Jekab's Music)
- Live at the Hillside Club (2014, Jekab's Music)
- Cheap Rent (2015, OA2 Records)
- A Brand New Take (2016, OA2 Records)
- Erik Jekabson Quintet (2017, Wide Hive Records)
- The Falling Dream (2018, OA2 Records)
- Erik Jekabson Sextet (2018, Wide Hive Records)
- Matter Is (2019, doubleOone)
- One Note at a Time (2020, Oklahoma Wind Music)
