= Bud Spangler discography =

- Studio albums: 20+
- EPs: ?
- Live albums: 20+
- Music videos: 0

The following is an incomplete discography for Bud Spangler, a jazz percussionist, music producer, and radio personality from Detroit, Michigan, who later worked in Northern California. He got his start drumming and producing for labels such as Tribe Records and Strata Records in Detroit, and from 1989 to 1996 he was an engineer for the Maybeck Recital Hall in Berkeley, California, also producing a number of Grammy-nominated albums.

== Discography ==
=== Production, instrumentals ===
Year	Release title	Artist	Label	Role (instrumentals in gray)
1974	Inside Ourselves	Sphere	Strata Records	Production, engineer
1974	Live'n Well	Bert Myrick	Strata Records	Production, editing, Mastering
1975	Time	Larry Nozero	Strata Records	Engineer
1975	Maulawi	Maulawi Nururdin	Strata Records	Producer, editing, Remastering
1976	Vibes from the Tribe	Phil Ranelin	Tribe Records	Percussion, Associate Producer, Assistant Engineer, Mixing, Remixing
1976	Mixed Bag's First Album	Mixed Bag	Tribe Records	Producer, mixing
1977	Live In Concert	Pat Metheny	ECM Records	Engineer
1981	Watch That First Step	Bruce Stephens	Strawberry Records	Brushes
1986	Nothin' But the Truth	Jessica Williams	Black Hawk Records	Drums
1986	Concert in the Park	Turk Murphy	Merrymakers	MC
1988	Epistrophy	Charlie Rouse	32 Jazz	Producer
1989	Live at the Jazz Workshop	Kitty Margolis	Mad-Kat Records	Producer, engineer, Liner Notes
1990	Fine and Mellow	Mary Stallings	Amoeba Music	Associate producer, percussion, remix
1992	A Handful of Stars	Dave McKenna	Concord Records	Engineer
1993	Of Kindred Souls	Roy Hargrove Quintet	Novus Records	Director
1994	Evolution	Kitty Margolis	Mad-Kat Records	Co-produter
1994	Turk Murphy Style	John Gill's San Francisco Jazz Band	GHB Records	Producer
1994	Interplay	Tom Peron/ Bud Spangler Quartet	Monarch Records	Drums, Primary Artist, Producer
1994	A Concord Jazz Christmas	Various	Concord Records	Engineer
1995	Turtle Logic	Mimi Fox	Monarch Records	Producer
1995	Live at Yoshi's	Cedar Walton	Monarch Records	Liner Notes, Producer
1996	Raven	Dave Ellis	Monarch Records	Bells, Guest Artist, Producer
1996	Dedication	Tom Peron/ Bud Spangler Quartet	Monarch Records	Drums, Primary Artist, Producer
1996	Live	The Hot Club of San Francisco		Concert Producer, Producer
1996	Clair de Lune	The Hot Club of San Francisco		Concert Producer
1996	Can't Hide Love	John "Buddy" Conner	Seaside Records	Producer
1997	Vibes from the Tribe, Vol. 2	The Tribe	Tribe Records	Associate Producer
1997	Triceratops	Triceratops	IGMOD	Producer
1997	Straight Up With a Twist	Kitty Margolis	Mad-Kat Records	Project Consultant
1997	One Notch Up	Mark Levine	Heavywood	Producer
1998	When Music Calls	Anton Schwartz	Antonjazz	Producer
1998	Trust Your Heart	Mary Stallings	Clarity Recordings	Associate Producer
1998	Sixth Sense	Robbie Kwock	Pacific Storm	Audio Production
1999	Ninety and Still Delivering	Narvin Kimball	Dansun	Producer
1999	Homenagem Brasileira	Sandy Cressman	Cressmanmusic	Liner Notes
2000	Treasure Chest	Joe Gilman	Timeless Records	Producer, mixing
2000	The Slow Lane	Anton Schwartz	Antonjazz	Producer
2000	The Single Petal of a Rose: The Essence of Duke Ellington	Marian McPartland	Concord Jazz	Coordination, Engineer
2000	Hey, It's Me	Mark Levine & the Latin Tinge	Left Coast Clave Records	Producer
2000	Destination Moon	Clairdee	Decca	Producer
2001	Vibes From The Tribe	Phil Ranelin	Amoeba Music	Associate producer
2001	On My Way To You	Ellen Robinson	EMR Music	Co-producer
2001	Standards, Old and New	Mimi Fox	Origin Records	Producer
2001	Serengeti	Mark Levine & the Latin Tinge		Producer
2001	Left Coast Life	Kitty Margolis	Mad-Kat Records	Associate Producer
2003	Resonance	Taylor Eigsti	Bop City Records	Producer, Liner Notes, Mixing
2003	Isla	Mark Levine		Producer
2003	Concord Records 30th Anniversary	Various	Concord Jazz	Remote Recording Coordinator, Remote Recording Engineer
2003	An Evening With Calvin	Calvin Keys	Lifeforce Jazz	Producer
2004	Time Again: Brubeck Revisited, Vol. 1	Joe Gilman	Sunnyside Records	Associate Producer, Mixing
2004	Live at Yoshi's: Blue Monday Party	Denise Perrier	Chez Perrier Records	Producer
2004	Holiday Time	Anton Schwartz	Antonjazz	Audio Production, Producer
2004	Heart & Soul: Live In San Francisco	Kitty Margolis	Mad-Kat Records	Associate Producer
2005	Time Again: Brubeck Revisited, Vol. 2	Joe Gilman	Sunnyside Records	Associate Producer, Mixing
2005	Music Moves	Clairdee		Producer
2006	View So Tender: Wonder Revisited, Vol. 1	The Joe Gilman Trio	Capri Records	Associate Producer, Mixing
2006	Radiant Blue	Anton Schwartz	Antonjazz	Co-producer
2006	Mercy!	Ellen Robinson	EMR Music	Co-producer
2007	View So Tender: Wonder Revisited, Vol. 2	Joe Gilman	Capri Records	Associate Producer, Mixing
2007	Love Stories	Ed Reed	Blue Shorts Records	Producer
2007	Just Friends	Mel Martin	Inner City	Recording Supervision
2007	75th Birthday Bash Live!	Kenny Burrell	Blue Note Records	location Producer
2008	Luminosity	Giacomo Gates	G88 Music	Producer
2008	Live at the 1994 Monterey Jazz Festival	Shirley Horn	Concord Music Group	Engineer, producer
2007	Ed Reed Sings Love Stories	Ed Reed	Blue Shorts Records	Producer
2008	Live at Yoshi's: A Salute to Lou	Nicolas Bearde	Right Groove	Producer, Consultant
2008	Can You Hear Me Now? Madeline Eastman Live	Madeline Eastman	Mad-Kat Records	Engineer
2008	50 Years of Dave Brubeck: Live at the Monterey Jazz Festival 1958-2007	Dave Brubeck	Monterey Jazz Fest	Producer
2009	The Wild Bill Davidson Centennial Concert 2006	Wild Bill Davidson	Jazzology Records	Engineer
2009	Off & On, The Music of Moacir Santos	Mark Levine	Left Coast Clave	Producer
2011	Born to Be Blue	Ed Reed	Blue Shorts Records	Producer
2012	Don't Wait Too Long	Ellen Robinson	EMR Music	Co-producer
2013	GrandMasters of Jazz	Terry Gibbs	OpenArt	Engineer
2014	Flash Mob	Anton Schwartz	Antonjazz	Co-producer
2014	Double Time	Kristen Miranda	SBK Records	Producer

=== Maybeck Recital Hall ===
Year	Release title	Artist	Label	Role
1989	Live at Maybeck Recital Hall, Vol. 01	Joanne Brackeen	Concord Jazz	Engineer
1989	Live at Maybeck Recital Hall, Vol. 02	Dave McKenna	Concord Jazz	Remote Recording Coordinator
1989	Live at Maybeck Recital Hall, Vol. 03	Dick Hyman	Concord Jazz	Engineer, Remote Recording Coordinator
1990	Live at Maybeck Recital Hall, Vol. 04-07	Walter Norris, Stanley Cowell, Hal Galper Quintet, John Hicks	Concord Jazz	Remote Recording Coordinator
1990	Live at Maybeck Recital Hall, Vol. 12	Barry Harris	Concord Jazz	Remote Recording Coordinator
1991	The Maybeck Recital Hall, Vol. 01-4	Various	Concord Jazz	Engineer, recording Coordinator
1991	Live at Maybeck Recital Hall, Vol. 09, 11	Marian McPartland, Roger Kellaway	Concord Jazz	Engineer, Remote Recording Coordinator
1991	Live at Maybeck Recital Hall, Vol. 14	Alan Broadbent	Concord Jazz	Remote Recording Engineer
1991	Live at Maybeck Recital Hall, Vol. 16	Hank Jones	Concord Jazz	Remote Recording Coordinator
1992	Live at Maybeck Recital Hall, Vol. 19	Richie Beirach	Concord Jazz	Engineer
1992	Live at Maybeck Recital Hall, Vol. 20-21	Jim McNeely, Jessica Williams	Concord Jazz	Remote Recording Coordinator
1992	Live at Maybeck Recital Hall, Vol. 22	Ellis Larkins	Concord Jazz	Engineer
1992	Live at Maybeck Recital Hall, Vol. 23, 27	Gene Harris, Denny Zeitlin	Concord Jazz	Assistant Engineer
1992	Live at Maybeck Recital Hall, Vol. 25	Cedar Walton	Concord Jazz	Engineer, Remote Recording Coordinator
1993	Live at Maybeck Recital Hall, Vol. 28 -29	Andy LaVerne, John Campbell	Concord Jazz	Engineer, Remote Recording Coordinator
1993	Live at Maybeck Recital Hall, Vol. 31	Fred Hersch	Concord Jazz	Remote Recording Coordinator
1993	Live at Maybeck Recital Hall, Vol. 32	Roland Hanna	Concord Jazz	Engineer, Remote Recording Coordinator
1993	Don Friedman at Maybeck	Don Friedman	Concord Records	Engineer, Remote Recording Coordinator
1994	Toshiko Akiyoshi at Maybeck	Toshiko Akiyoshi	Concord Records	Engineer, engineering Coordinator
1994	Live at Maybeck Recital Hall, Vol. 34	Kenny Werner	Concord Jazz	Coordination, Engineer
1994	Live at Maybeck Recital Hall, Vol. 35	George Cables	Concord Jazz	Engineer, Remote Recording Coordinator
1994	Live at Maybeck Recital Hall, Vol. 38, 41	Ted Rosenthal, Allen Farnham	Concord Jazz	Engineer
1994	Live at Maybeck Recital Hall, Vol. 39, 40	Kenny Drew, Jr., Monty Alexander	Concord Jazz	Engineer, Remote Recording Coordinator
1995	Live at Maybeck Recital Hall, Vol. 37	John Colianni	Concord Jazz	Engineer
1996	Live at Maybeck Recital Hall, Vol. 42	James Williams	Concord Jazz	Engineer, Remote Recording Coordinator
