= Swimming at the 1987 Pan American Games – Men's 200 metre freestyle =

Men's 200 metre freestyle at the 1987 Pan American Games
- Venue: Indiana University Natatorium
- Dates: August 9 (preliminaries and finals)
- Competitors: from - nations

Medalists
| Gold medal | John Witchel | United States |
| Silver medal | Carlos Scanavino | Uruguay |
| Bronze medal | Brian Jones | United States |

The men's 200 metre freestyle competition of the swimming events at the 1987 Pan American Games took place on 9 August at the Indiana University Natatorium. The last Pan American Games champion was Bruce Hayes of US.

This race consisted of four lengths of the pool, all in freestyle.

== Results ==
All times are in minutes and seconds.

| KEY: | q | Fastest non-qualifiers | Q | Qualified | GR | Games record | NR | National record | PB | Personal best | SB | Seasonal best |

=== Final ===
The final was held on August 9.

| Rank | Name | Nationality | Time | Notes |
|---|---|---|---|---|
| 1st place, gold medalist(s) | John Witchel | United States | 1:50.90 | |
| 2nd place, silver medalist(s) | Carlos Scanavino | Uruguay | 1:51.21 | |
| 3rd place, bronze medalist(s) | Brian Jones | United States | 1:52.11 | |
| 4 | Júlio César Rebolal | Brazil | 1:52.15 | |
| 5 | Gary Vandermeulen | Canada | 1:52.44 | |
| 6 | Cristiano Michelena | Brazil | 1:52.89 | |
| 7 | Darren Ward | Canada | 1:53.38 | |
| 8 | Luis Moreli | Puerto Rico | 1:53.57 | |
