= Roberta Donnay =

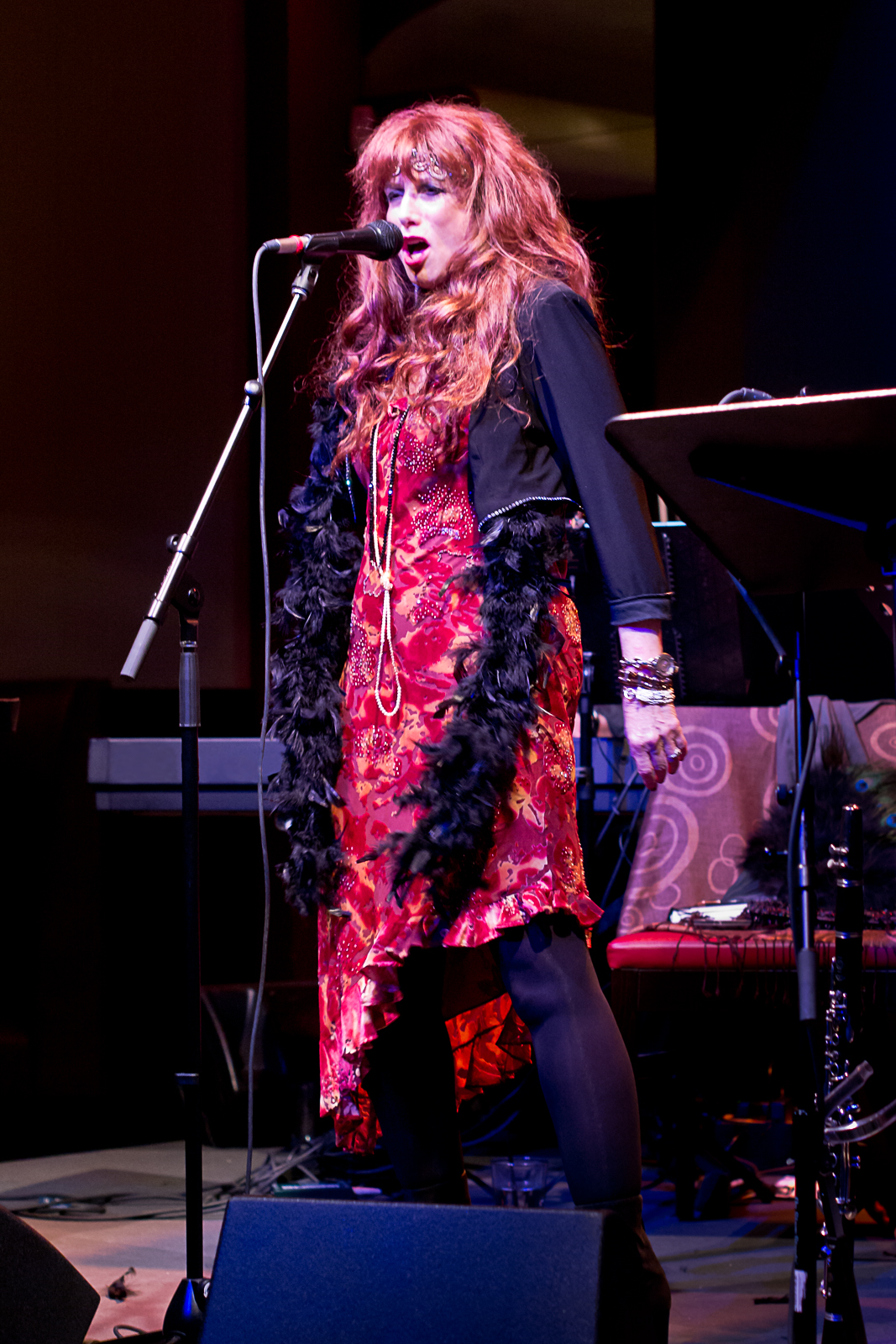
- Donnay in 2013

Background information
- Born: August 10, 1966 (age 60); Washington, D.C., U.S.
- Genres: Jazz, Blues, Americana
- Occupations: Singer, composer, musician, poet, producer
- Instruments: Vocals, Percussion, Guitar
- Years active: 1982–present
- Labels: Motéma, BluJazz, Pacific Coast Jazz, Rainforest, Village Jazz Cafe
- Formerly of: Dan Hicks and His Hot Licks
- Website: robertadonnay.com

Roberta Donnay is an American jazz singer, musician, composer, and producer. She has released nine studio albums and shared the stage with such artists as Booker T. Jones, Dr. John, David Grisman, John P. Hammond, Elvis Costello, Leon Russell, Michael McDonald, Neil Young, and Maria Muldaur. She toured extensively with Dan Hicks & The Hot Licks as a Lickette, providing vocals and percussion. She has performed at the Monterey Jazz Festival, SXSW, the Jacksonville Jazz Festival, and other venues across the USA.

Her songs have been featured on The O.C., Riverdale, Nash Bridges, Numb3rs, and PAN AM, among others. Her song, One World, was the theme for the United Nations 50th Anniversary and World AIDS Day in South Africa and earned her an ASCAP Composer Award.

== Career ==
Donnay grew up in Washington, D.C., and learned to sing from the radio. Jazz being her first love, she was influenced at an early age by Louis Armstrong, Billie Holiday, Ella Fitzgerald, Mae West, and Bessie Smith. She began singing professionally at 16, wandering Europe with a knapsack and borrowing guitars on-site. After relocating to San Francisco, she sang Dixieland and traditional jazz with "Dick Oxtot's Golden Age Jazz Band" and performed with "Tom Keats & his Tom Kats". Her first album, Catch the Wave, was the first indie CD released in the San Francisco Bay area. Her music has been produced by jazz producer Orrin Keepnews. As a singer and songwriter, Donnay toured the U.S. with her guitar and appeared on various shows. She returned to singing jazz full-time in 2005. She is a practicing Buddhist.

She has performed with and opened shows for Bob Dorough, Dave Ellis, David Grisman, Junior Brown, Tommy Castro, Peter Coyote, Woody Harrelson, Ernestine Anderson, Dan Fogelberg, Johnny Lange, Huey Lewis, Eddie Money, Joe Sample, Lenny Williams, Mitch Woods, Neil Young, and Tuck & Patti, among others.

Donnay has released ten studio albums, three of which were recorded as Roberta Donnay & the Prohibition Mob Band. Bathtub Gin was named One of the Best Albums of 2015 by DownBeat Magazine.

She formed the music group, Roberta Donnay & the Rhythm in the late 1980s and they performed together until the early 1990s. In 1999, Donnay signed a publishing deal with Heavy Hitters Music who placed her songs in such TV shows as, The Young and the Restless, One Life to Live, All My Children, and That's Life. Her songs have also been featured on The Unit, Nash Bridges, Numbers, PAN AM, and That's Life.

In 2000, Donnay founded, DivaBands (inspired by the Lilith Fair), a line-up of various female singer-songwriters based in the San Francisco Bay Area, whom Donnay also performed with. DivaBands' first gig was a benefit concert at the Red Devil Lounge in San Francisco which had such a large turnout that the club owner suggested she book another show at one of his other clubs. DivaBands garnered such a successful following in California that Donnay organized a national tour performing in Arizona, Washington, Wisconsin, Illinois, and Minnesota.

Her song, "One World," became a theme for the United Nations 50th Anniversary and was performed on 5 continents as a world peace anthem. It was also chosen as the theme for World AIDS Day in South Africa in 2003.

== Film and television music ==
- 2005 - The O.C. - No Easy Way to Say Goodbye
- 2006 - Numb3rs - No Easy Way to Say Goodbye
- 2011 - Journey of the Universe (music supervisor)
- 2012 - PAN AM - Something Happened Last Night
- 2014 - What's a Girl to Do - Actress, Script, Music, Executive Producer
- 2014 - Pie Lady of Pie Town - Call Me the Breeze
- 2015 - The Young and the Restless - Something I Was Unprepared For
- 2019 - Riverdale - No Easy Way to Say Goodbye
- 2021 - The Next Unicorn - No Easy Way to Say Goodbye

== Discography ==
- Catch the Wave (Heartfeather Music/Rainforest, 1989)
- Soul Reverse (Rainforest, 1998)
- Bohemian (Rainforest, 2001)
- Back Before the Why (Rainforest, 2005)
- What's Your Story (Pacific Coast Jazz, 2008)
- A Little Sugar (Motéma, 2012)
- Bathtub Gin (Motéma, 2015)
- My Heart Belongs to Satchmo (Blujazz, 2018)
- Baby, It's Cold Outside (single) Bob Dorough & Roberta Donnay (Circumstantial Productions, 2018)
- Blossom-ing! (Village Jazz Cafe, 2022)

=== As guest ===
- Jump For Joy, Mitch Woods and His Rocket, 2001
- Tangled Tales, Dan Hicks & The Hot Licks (2009)
- Crazy for Christmas, Dan Hicks & The Hot Licks (2010)
- Live at Davies Hall, Dan Hicks & The Hot Licks (2012)
- Jeff Oster Live!, Jeff Oster, (2016)
