= Flash mob (disambiguation) =

A flash mob is where a group of people rapidly gather and perform an unusual and pointless act and then quickly disperse.

Flash mob may also refer to:

== Social activity ==
- Pillow fight flash mob, a flash mob based upon a pillow fight
- Flash rob, a crime that shares similarities to a flash mob

== Music ==
- Flash Mob (album), a 2014 album by Anton Schwartz
- Flashmob (album), a 2009 album by Vitalic
- Flashmob (musicians), Italian DJ/Producer

== Technology ==
- Flash mob computing, ad hoc cluster computing
- Slashdot effect, also called a flash crowd, in which a website experiences an overload of traffic after being linked to on sites like Slashdot
