= John Witchel =

American entrepreneur, co-founder of Prosper Marketplace

Personal details
- Born: New York City, U.S.
- Education: Stanford University (BA)
- Occupation: Co-founder and CEO of King Energy

John Witchel is an American entrepreneur, NCAA and Pac-10 swimming champion (both as a team member and individually), two-time Pan American Games gold medal winner, and two-time Goodwill Games gold medal winner. He was the co-founder and CTO of Prosper Marketplace, America's first peer-to-peer lending marketplace, and the co-creator flash mob computing. He is the co-founder and current CEO of King Energy.

== Early life and education ==
John Witchel was born in New York City. He attended Columbia Grammar & Preparatory School, and graduated from Stuyvesant High School in 1986. He earned a B.A. in Political Science from Stanford University in 1990, and an M.S. in Computer Science from University of San Francisco in 2004.

An accomplished competitive swimmer, Witchel was a member of the U.S. National Swimming Team from 1985 through 1990, competing for the United States in the Goodwill Games (1986), the Pan American Games (1987), and the Pan Pacific Swimming Championships (1989). He won the Pac-10 Swimming Championships 200 Freestyle three times as an individual. He was a member of the Stanford University 1987 NCAA Swimming Championship team and won the 500 Freestyle in 1988 at the NCAA Division I Championships.

Witchel competed at the 1989 Maccabiah Games in Israel, winning a silver medal in the 200 m freestyle.

== Career ==
=== XCom Corp ===
Witchel founded XCom Corp in September 1994 as an early web development shop in San Francisco, California. XCom was acquired by USWeb in 1996 prior to going public in 1997.

=== Prosper Marketplace ===
Witchel co-founded Prosper Marketplace in 2004 with Chris Larsen. He was the Chief Technology Officer and lead architect of the system. Prosper was the first peer-to-peer lending marketplace which allowed individuals to lend and borrow money directly from each other using a Dutch auction-like system. Witchel left the company prior to the 2008 SEC cease and desist order against Prosper.

=== Common Assets ===
In 2014, Witchel co-founded Common Assets as the Chief Technology Officer; it was acquired by SolarCity. Common Assets was the underlying infrastructure for SolarCity's Solar Bond program. SolarCity's Solar Bonds were the first such product to be nationally registered. After the Tesla acquisition of SolarCity, Tesla discharged most of its solar bonds ahead of the maturity date, paying back all the principal with interest for the life of the bond.

=== GitPrime, Inc. ===
Witchel helped launch GitPrime, an early software engineering analytics company, acquired by Pluralsight in 2019. Initially as the first investor and board member, and then as president, Witchel was responsible for strategy and product design.

== Board work ==
Witchel was a board member and early investor in Shopatron from 2010 to 2015 (acquired by Vista Equity Partners) and UserTesting from 2012 to 2019. He is currently a board member of Wunder Capital, a Boulder, Colorado-based commercial solar financier, and La Plata Electric Association, a member-owned, not-for-profit, electric distribution cooperative in Southwest Colorado. He was previously an advisor to Credit Karma and CrowdStreet.

== See also ==
- Swimming at the 1987 Pan American Games – Men's 200 metre freestyle
- Swimming at the 1987 Pan American Games – Men's 4 × 200 metre freestyle relay
