= Flash Mob (album) =

Studio album by Anton Schwartz
- Released: January 28, 2014
- Genre: Jazz
- Length: 67:00
- Label: Antonjazz
- Producer: Anton Schwartz, Bud Spangler

Anton Schwartz chronology
Radiant Blue (2006)	Flash Mob (2014)

Flash Mob is the fifth album by jazz saxophonist and composer Anton Schwartz on his own Antonjazz label, released in 2014. It received limited press including a feature article in the San Francisco Chronicle an artist profile in DownBeat magazine and a feature story on NPR's Morning Edition as well as positive reviews and a long run on the Jazz Radio Top 10.

Professional ratings
Review scores
Source	Rating
DownBeat	4/5 stars
Earshot Jazz	(positive)
All About Jazz	(positive)
L.A. Jazz Scene	(positive)

== Personnel ==
- Anton Schwartz - tenor saxophone
- Dominick Farinacci - trumpet
- Taylor Eigsti - piano
- John Shifflett - bass
- Lorca Hart - drums

== Production ==
- Producers: Anton Schwartz, Bud Spangler
- Engineer: Dan Feiszli
- Mixing: Dan Feiszli
- Mastering: Paul Stubblebine
- Arranger: Anton Schwartz
- Graphic design: Dennis Michael Dimos
- Photography: Steve Korn

== Track listing ==
No.	Title	Writer(s)	Length
1.	"Flash Mob"	Anton Schwartz	6:09
2.	"Swamp Thang"	Anton Schwartz	5:09
3.	"Cumulonimbus"	Anton Schwartz	7:48
4.	"Pangur Ban"	Anton Schwartz	6:49
5.	"Alleybird"	Anton Schwartz	6:33
6.	"Spurious Causes"	Anton Schwartz	7:52
7.	"La Mesha"	Kenny Dorham	7:19
8.	"Epistrophy"	Thelonious Monk, Kenny Clarke	4:28
9.	"Glass Half Missing"	Anton Schwartz	6:07
10.	"The Contender"	Anton Schwartz	4:14
11.	"Dawn Song"	Anton Schwartz	4:29
Total length:			67:00
