= Cotati Jazz Festival =

Annual music festival in California, United States

Coordinates: 38.32669°N 122.70721°W

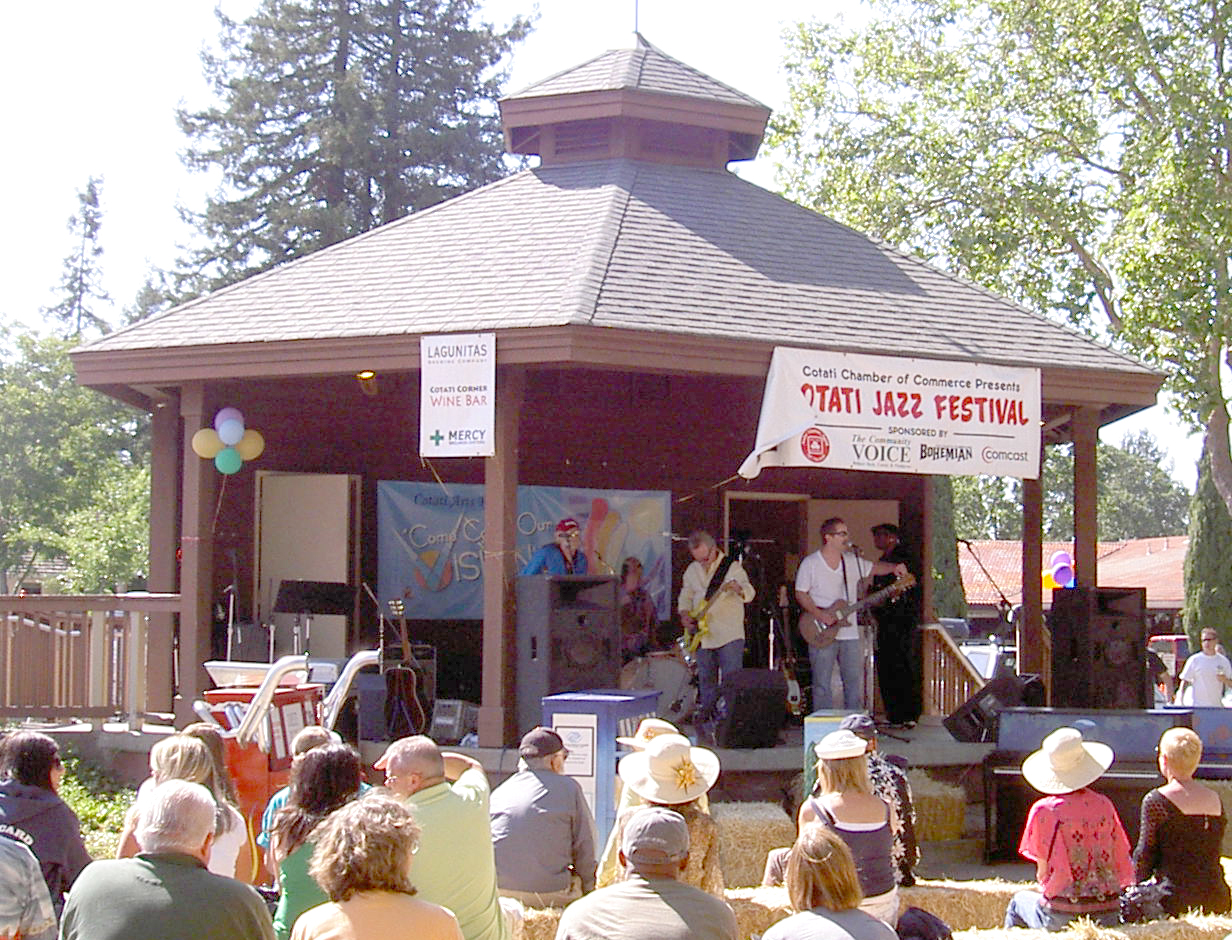
- Soul Shine Band in 2010
- Genre: Jazz and related genres
- Dates: mid-June
- Location: Cotati, California
- Years active: 1981–present
- Website: CotatiJazz.com

The Cotati Jazz Festival is an annual music festival held in Cotati, California, United States, since 1981. It typically takes place mid-June. Since 2006, admission has been free.

This festival went virtual in 2020.

== 31st annual Cotati Jazz Festival (2011) ==
Held on Saturday, June 18, 2011 from noon to 7 p.m.

The lineup included the following artists and bands:

- The Gomez Counter Band
- Keith Andrew Band
- Gumbo West
- Tracy Rose Trio & Pamela Hamilton
- Tumbao
- One World Band
- Jazz Roots
- Chris Miano
- Dick Conte Jazz Quartet

== 30th annual Cotati Jazz & Antiques Festival (2010) ==
Held on Saturday, June 19, 2010 from noon to 7 p.m.

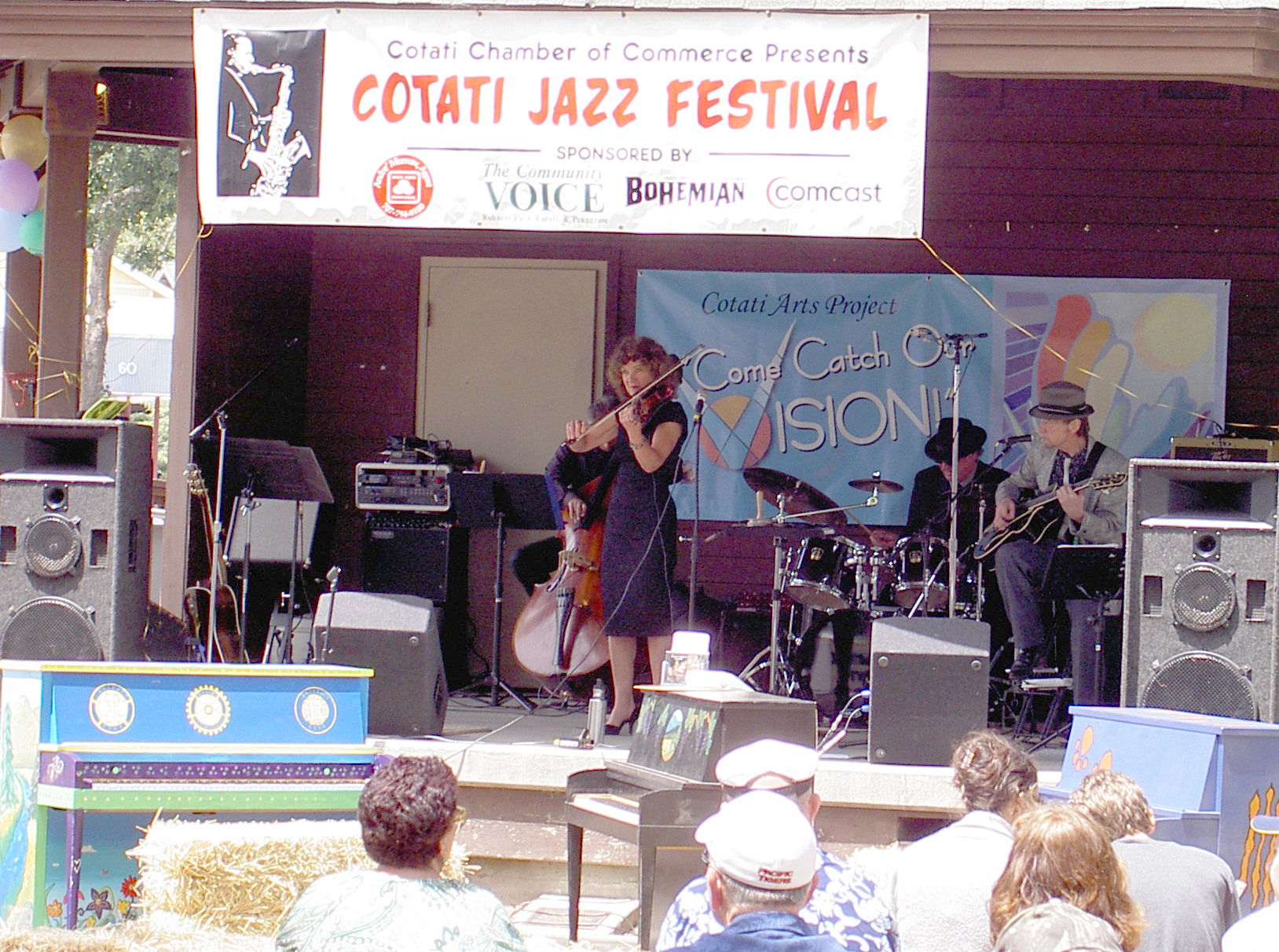
Susan Comstock Quintet in 2010

The lineup included the following artists and bands:

- The Susan Comstock Quintet
- Rotten Tomatoes
- Soul Shine Band
- Keith Andrew Band
- Strange Brew
- Still Smooth
- Simply Amazing
- Sunday at Ed’s
- Chris Miano Band
- Jazz Roots
- Dan Castro Group (bass clarinet)

== 28th annual Cotati Jazz Blues & Arts Festival (2008) ==
Held on Saturday, June 14, 2008 from noon to midnight. The theme was "Swing Baby, Swing." Free admission. 50% of net profits were pledged to the Rancho Cotate Music Boosters.

The lineup included the following artists and local bands:

- The Keith Andrew Band
- The Blues Defenders
- The Blues Revue
- The Defenders
- Tony Gagarin
- Robert Gastelum
- Gumbo West
- Himalaya
- Jazz Roots
- Moonlighters
- The Pyrotones
- Tracy Rose Quartet
- Stompy Jones
- Jeffrey Suttles
- Swing Fever
- The Thugz
- Tumbao

== 27th annual Cotati Jazz, Blues & Arts Festival (2007) ==
In 2007, the event was subtitled A Salute to New Orleans, and pledged 50% of its net profits to Hurricane Katrina relief. Held on Saturday, June 16, 2007 from noon to 6 p.m., its lineup included:

- Fourth Street Jazz Band
- Justis Jones
- Gumbo West
- Christopher Ford
- Music to My Ears Jazz Ensemble
- Bob Logan
- Miano Jarab
- Stewart Potter
- Allegria Latin Jazz, and
- Erstwhile Medicine Show.

== 26th annual Cotati Jazz Blues and Art Festival (2006) ==
Held on Saturday, June 17, 2006 from noon to midnight, admission was free. The venues included:

- La Plaza Park
- Cotati Creek Cafe
- Dos Amigos Restaurant,
- Spancky’s Bar
- Sweet Lou’s Trattoria
- The Tradewinds
- Oliver’s Market, and
- Redwood Cafe.

== 25th annual Cotati Jazz Blues and Arts Festival (2005) ==
Held on Saturday, June 18, 2005 from noon to midnight, its lineup included:

- Blue Moon
- Stompy Jones
- Donna Arvidson Band
- Willie & T-Bone
- Fiasco
- Tombao
- Stragglerz
- Ian Scherer Quartet
- Mike Martinez Latin Jazz Band, and
- One World Band.

Admission was $10 adults; free for youngsters under age 12.

== 24th annual Cotati Jazz Festival (2004) ==
Held on Saturday June 19, 2004 from noon to 9 p.m., it included more than forty artists. Admission was $10.

== 23rd annual Cotati Jazz Festival (2003) ==
Held on Sunday, June 15, 2003 from noon to 9 p.m, its venues included:

- La Plaza Park
- Dos Amigos Restaurant
- The Tradewinds, and
- Sweet Lou's Family Trattoria.

== 22nd annual Cotati Jazz Festival (2002) ==
Held on June 15–16, 2002 from 1 p.m. to 6 p.m.

== 21st annual Cotati Jazz Festival (2001) ==
Held on June 16–17, 2001. Admission was $15 for one day, $25 for both.

== 20th annual Cotati Jazz Festival (2000) ==
Held on June 17–18, 2000. Artists appearing included:

- Kenny Stahl

== 19th annual Cotati Jazz Festival (1999) ==
Held on June 19–20, 1999. Admission was $15 for one day, $25 for both.

== 16th annual Cotati Jazz Festival (1996) ==
Organized by Jud Snyder, the 1996 festival was held on June 15–16, 1996 from 1 p.m. to 6 p.m. Admission was $12 for one day, $20 for both days. The theme was "Women in Music," and featured performers included:

- Madeline Eastman
- Joyce Cooling
- Madeline Duran
- Dottie Dodgion
- Benny Barth
- Bud Spangler
- Mel Graves
- Lisa Carr

== Previous years ==
- A Cotati Jazz Festival was held 1–6 p.m. on June 27–28, 1981 and featured a Bobby Hutcherson quartet. Admission cost $8 for both days.
- The 4th annual Cotati Jazz Festival was held on June 2–3, 1984.
- The 7th annual Cotati Jazz Festival was held on June 13–14, 1987.
- The 8th annual Cotati Jazz Festival was held on June 11–12, 1988.
- The 9th annual Cotati Jazz Festival was held on June 17–18, 1989.
- The 11th annual Cotati Jazz Festival was held on June 15–16, 1991.
- The 12th annual Cotati Jazz Festival was held in June 1991 and lasted two days.
- The 15th annual Cotati Jazz Festival was held on June 17–18, 1995. Admission cost $22 for both days.
- The 41st in 2020 marked the first time the festival went virtual. Coverage was pre-recorded or live-streamed.

== See also ==
- List of San Francisco Bay Area festivals and fairs
