= Swimming at the 1987 Pan American Games – Men's 4 × 200 metre freestyle relay =

Men's 4 × 200 metre freestyle relay at the 1987 Pan American Games
- Venue: Indiana University Natatorium
- Dates: August 10 (preliminaries and finals)
- Competitors: from - nations

Medalists
Gold medal	Paul Robinson; Brian Jones; Mike O'Brien; John Witchel	United States
Silver medal	Darren Ward; Christopher Chalmers; Gary Vandermeulen; Mike Meldrum	Canada
Bronze medal	Jorge Fernandes; Cristiano Michelena; Cyro Delgado; Júlio César Rebolal	Brazil

The men's 4 × 200 metre freestyle relay competition of the swimming events at the 1987 Pan American Games took place on August 10, 1987 at the Indiana University Natatorium in Indianapolis, Indiana. The last Pan American Games champion was the United States.

This race consisted of sixteen lengths of the pool. Each of the four swimmers completed four lengths of the pool. The first swimmer had to touch the wall before the second could leave the starting block.

== Results ==
All times are in minutes and seconds.

KEY:	q	Fastest non-qualifiers	Q	Qualified	GR	Games record	NR	National record	PB	Personal best	SB	Seasonal best

=== Final ===
The final was held on August 10.

Rank	Nation	Swimmers	Time	Notes
1st place, gold medalist(s)	United States	Paul Robinson (1:50.07); Brian Jones (1:51.31); Mike O'Brien (1:51.21); John Witchel (1:50.70)	7:23.29	GR
2nd place, silver medalist(s)	Canada	Darren Ward; Christopher Chalmers; Gary Vandermeulen; Mike Meldrum	7:29.84	
3rd place, bronze medalist(s)	Brazil	Jorge Fernandes; Cristiano Michelena; Cyro Delgado; Júlio César Rebolal	7:29.92	
4	Puerto Rico	- - - -	7:43.71	
5	Cuba	- - - -	7:46.80	
6	Panama	- - - -	8:01.39	
7	Virgin Islands	- - - -	8:32.87	
8	-	- - - -	-	
