= Shootin' Straight =

Live album by Dan Hicks
- Released: 1994
- Venue: McCabe's Guitar Shop, Santa Monica, California
- Label: On the Spot
- Producer: Joel Moss

Dan Hicks chronology
It Happened One Bite (1978)	Shootin' Straight (1994)	Return to Hicksville (1997)

Shootin' Straight is a live album by the American musician Dan Hicks, released in 1994. Hicks was backed by the Acoustic Warriors. It was Hicks's first major album since 1978.

== Production ==
Produced by Joel Moss, the album was recorded over two nights at McCabe's Guitar Shop, in Santa Monica, California. Hicks had been playing McCabe's for more than 12 years. Shootin' Straight is made up of previously unrecorded songs.

Bette Midler and Asleep at the Wheel had covered Hicks's "Up! Up! Up!"

== Critical reception ==
Professional ratings
Review scores
Source	Rating
AllMusic	4/5 stars
Robert Christgau	(2-star Honorable Mention)
The Commercial Appeal	3/4 stars
The Encyclopedia of Popular Music	3/5 stars
The Indianapolis Star	3/4 stars
MusicHound Rock: The Essential Album Guide	3/5 stars

The Washington Post wrote that the album "proves that his off-beat sense of humor and his dead-on sense of swing are intact... Hicks sings about barflies, bank robbers and flying-saucer pilots in a small, dry voice that drifts easily over the crisp swing below." The Knoxville News Sentinel noted that "Hicks sounds charmingly confused in his stage patter."

The Indianapolis Star called the album full of "quirky humor and acoustic tunes that draw on influences ranging from jazz accordion to Texas swing slide guitar." The Los Angeles Times thought that "the zesty interplay of guitars, fiddles and mandolins looks back to Django Reinhardt." The Commercial Appeal stated: "Instrumentally, this is a group to reckon with, as Paul Robinson's lightning lead acoustic guitar intertwines with Stevie Blacke's mandolin and Jim Boggio provides atmospheric accordion." Elijah Wald, of The Boston Globe, listed it as one of 1994's best albums.

AllMusic wrote that "the material owes a lot to pre-bebop jazz, but it also owes a lot to country, rock, folk, and blues."

== Track listing ==
All tracks are written by Dan Hicks.

No.	Title	Length
1.	"Up! Up! Up!"	4:01
2.	"Shootin' Straight"	5:07
3.	"Hell, I'd Go!"	2:26
4.	"Bottoms Up!"	3:57
5.	"Texas Kinda Attitude"	3:29
6.	"Willie"	4:15
7.	"Savin' My Lovin'"	4:56
8.	"13-D"	3:37
9.	"Barstool Boogie"	3:30
10.	"A Magician"	3:32
11.	"Who Are You?"	4:07
12.	"Level with Me Laurie"	4:05
13.	"The Rounder"	3:49
14.	"$100,000"	3:13
