= Brad Felt =

American musician and educator

- Brad Felt in performance at Cadieux Cafe, Detroit

Background information
- Born: Bradley James Felt; May 6, 1956; Royal Oak, Michigan
- Origin: Detroit, Michigan
- Died: October 6, 2011 (aged 55) Pontiac, Michigan
- Genres: Jazz, bebop, hard bop, Post-bop, modal jazz, avant-garde jazz, ragtime, classical
- Occupations: Musician, bandleader, composer, educator
- Instruments: Tuba, euphonium, baritone horn, piano
- Years active: 1972–2011
- Labels: D Flat, Launch Control, DartBlef
- Formerly of: Marcus Belgrave, Roy Brooks, James Carter, Gerald Cleaver, Kenny Cox, Wendell Harrison, Frank Isola, Howard Johnson, Jaribu Shahid
- Website: http://www.bradfeltmusic.com/

Bradley James Felt (May 6, 1956 – October 6, 2011) was an American tuba and euphonium player, composer, bandleader and educator. His work extended modern jazz traditions, using tuba and euphonium as lead and featured solo instruments.

== Biography ==
Brad Felt was born May 6, 1956, in Royal Oak, Michigan to Charles and Jeanne (nee Vorhes) Felt. He was raised in Bloomfield Township and West Bloomfield Township, Michigan.

Felt became interested in music through hearing his parents play records and sing around the house, and he began playing trumpet in grade school.

Braces were put on Felt's teeth as a teenager, making it difficult to play trumpet. At the behest of his junior high school band director, he switched to tuba at age 14. He later recalled:

I was the last-chair trumpet player and they needed a tuba player. So (the band director) asked me to switch, and I said yes. He basically shut me in a room with a beginning tuba book and mostly left me to my own devices until I was ready to rejoin the ensemble. It was a drag at first, but I rapidly came to love it. I really blossomed in high school.

Felt attended Bloomfield Hills Andover High School, graduating in 1974. His tenure in the concert band there culminated with a performance of Frank Bencriscutto's "Concertino for Tuba and Band." Following high school Felt attended Oakland University in Rochester, Michigan on a performance scholarship. Oakland's music department included a strong jazz faculty staffed largely with active professionals from the Detroit area. In 1991 he said:

...it was at Oakland University, thinking that I would play with a symphony someday, that I took the jazz ensemble course with Doc Holladay, Sam Sanders and especially Herbie Williams, who was a great early influence on me.

Felt participated in the jazz workshop led by trumpeter Marcus Belgrave and formed a musical partnership with saxophonist Steve Wood (a fellow Oakland student) that would continue for 35 years. Felt began to focus on urban music venues and opportunities to learn from local artists. Soon he encountered and performed with Nasir Hafiz (a.k.a. Abe Woodley), Roy Brooks, Kenny Cox, Wendell Harrison, Frank Isola, Phil Lasley, Bud Spangler, Donald Walden, A. Spencer Barefield, Ed Nuccilli and many others.

From this point forward, Felt was committed to extending the Detroit jazz tradition and developing his own artistry within that continuum. Much of this commitment was born of an appreciation for the support he received from the local jazz community. Felt's suburban background and unusual choice of instrument were not questioned. Instead, he was accepted as an artistic peer and community member.

In addition to frequent work in Detroit-area nightclubs, Felt's performances were regularly featured at the annual Detroit International Jazz Festival. During an appearance there in 2010, he said:

I play...from a tradition of Detroit music that I'm trying to extend further...When I was first coming up...The Detroit community welcomed me with open arms...It's a great debt that I owe to the Detroit jazz community.

Felt's skill as a jazz songwriter coincided with and developed alongside his work as a performer. He started writing jazz tunes soon after he began playing the music, eventually generating over 60 compositions – Many of which were featured in live performances as well as on his recordings. As he noted in a 2010 interview:

In a lot of ways, being a composer has been the thing that defines my musical experience maybe more than the instruments I play.

In 1989, the quintet Felt co-led with Steve Wood travelled to California for a performance at the Hollywood Palace as a finalist in the Hennessy Cognac Jazz Search competition.

Around 1990, the Steve Wood/Brad Felt Quintet was featured as part of the Detroit-area cable TV series Jazz Masters-Keepers of the Flame.

In April 1990, Felt headlined a concert at the Detroit Institute of Arts entitled The Tuba Rules! featuring primarily his own compositions. Supporting Felt were Steve Wood and James Carter (reeds), Rob Pipho (vibes), Kenny Cox (piano), Jaribu Shahid (bass) and Danny Spencer (drums).

In 1990 Felt appeared with Kenny Cox and the Guerilla Jam Band at the Moers Festival in Germany.

Felt was the subject of a "Just Stanecki" news feature on Detroit's WJBK-TV in 1992.

He addressed his unusual choice of instruments for the music he played in a 2010 interview:

Q. Was there ever a disconnect between your desire to play jazz and the fact that the tuba wasn't really considered a jazz instrument ? A. Never. I was aware that I was going to be learning from people who weren't playing my instrument. Like a lot of people, I would take the turntable and turn it down to half-speed and learn Charlie Parker solos. Early on, I began to think that this could be a good thing...You're not dealing with that ball-and-chain of being connected to the instrument. There are no biases related to the horn. You can pick any instrument you want to emulate. There's a certain freedom.

In 1990 he told The Detroit News:

The tuba has more octaves than any other wind instrument. It can play a ballad better than a trumpet can. It has more available, but nobody knows it.

Felt added euphonium and baritone horn to his instrumental arsenal during the 1990s. He began to put more focus on euphonium in succeeding years, to the point where many performances featured that instrument exclusively. His first CD Exordium was released in 1995 (re-released in 2019), with five original compositions among eight tunes. It showcased performances by Felt on tuba, euphonium and baritone horn, Gary Schunk on piano, Jaribu Shahid on bass and Gerald Cleaver on drums. In his review, Cadence magazine's Richard B. Kamins stated:

Brad Felt is a brass master...Felt's ease of movement in the tuba's higher register works to dispel any awkward image of the horn as a lead instrument.

In the 1990s Felt met Howard Johnson, leader of the tuba-focused band Gravity. This led to Felt's participation in two European tours with Gravity (in 1998 and 1999) as a featured performer.

Felt won an artist's grant for jazz composition from the Michigan Council for the Arts in 1989 and fellowships from the National Endowment for the Arts in 1990 and 1995.

In the new millennium, Felt worked frequently with Detroit pianist, composer, arranger and bandleader Scott Gwinnell. Felt performed on three CDs released by Gwinnell and served as executive producer on the last – Cass Corridor Story.

His second CD First Call was released in 2009 featuring his NūQuartet Plus in a program of original compositions. He played euphonium on all eight songs, supported by Steve Wood (tenor and soprano sax), Gary Schunk (piano), Nick Calandro (bass) and Bill Higgins (drums). Reviewing for the Southeastern Michigan Jazz Association, Piotr Michalowski stated:

(Felt)...has managed to turn the euphonium into a perfectly normal jazz instrument, sounding somewhat like a dusky voiced valve trombone. His fast-fingered post-bop solos are complex and well developed, characterized by a fanciful melodic sensibility.

In Cadence magazine, David Dupont said:

Felt's playing brings all the (euphonium's) qualities to the fore. His tone is resonant, his articulation clear and firm...His playing seems very much of a piece with the compositions.

Felt spoke about having a group concept in 2010:

The idea is to have a group concept; that's my mantra. When I'm in the early stages of writing a new piece, I'm already thinking about how the group will change it in performance and how that might affect me as I write...my goal is to realize the concept and ideas inside each composition. The reason you establish a strong concept is so it can evolve and then you can begin to deconstruct it.

His third CD Dana Sessions: Duets with John Dana was released in 2021 (recorded circa 2010). Felt played euphonium on all 13 tracks, accompanied by bassist John Dana.

== Death ==
Felt died October 6, 2011, of pancreatic cancer.

== Legacy ==
In a remembrance for the Metro Times, W. Kim Heron said:

Brad was a master of the tuba and its more compact cousin the euphonium...One sign of his prowess is that he had worked (with) Howard Johnson's band Gravity...To get the nod for Gravity's all-tuba-family horn section means a tuba player really has arrived on the national level.

Mark Stryker writing in the Detroit Free Press observed:

Felt was a magnificent musician...He took big, cumbersome instruments and made them sound fleet and airborne. He was a vibrant post-bopper, playing with an expansive harmonic knowledge and no-prisoners attack that could stun an audience into silence.

== Awards ==
Finalist, Hennessy Cognac Jazz Search (1989)

Creative Artist Grant for Jazz Composition, Michigan Council for the Arts (1989)

Individual Artist Fellowship for Jazz Performance, National Endowment for the Arts (1990)

Individual Artist Fellowship for Jazz Performance, National Endowment for the Arts (1995)

Certificate of Appreciation – Outstanding Service to Jazz Education – International Association of Jazz Educators, Toronto (2003)

== Educator ==
Instructor – Applied Improvisation, University of Toledo (2003–2009)

== Discography ==
=== As leader ===
- 1995: Exordium (D Flat) – Re-released in 2019
- 2009: First Call (Launch Control)
- 2021: Dana Sessions: Duets with John Dana (DartBlef)

=== As sideman ===
==== With Roy Brooks ====
- Live at the Montreux/Detroit Jazz Festival 1986/1989 (Sagittarius A-Star, 2013)

==== With Scott Gwinnell ====
- Basement Vibes (None, 2002)
- Brush Fire (WSG, 2009)
- Cass Corridor Story (Detroit Music Factory, 2012)

==== With Doug Halladay ====
- New Beginnings (None, 2011)

==== With Wendell Harrison ====
- Live in Concert (Wenha, 1992)

==== With Ed Nuccilli & Plural Circle ====
- The Montreux-Detroit Years (Semper, 1999)
- Ed Nuccilli & Plural Circle (Ed Nuccilli & Plural Circle, 2006)

==== With Maureen Schiffman ====
- Sing a Little Happy Song (MLS, 1989)

==== With Pamela Wise ====
- Songo Festividad (Wenha, 1994)
