= John Shifflett =

American jazz musician

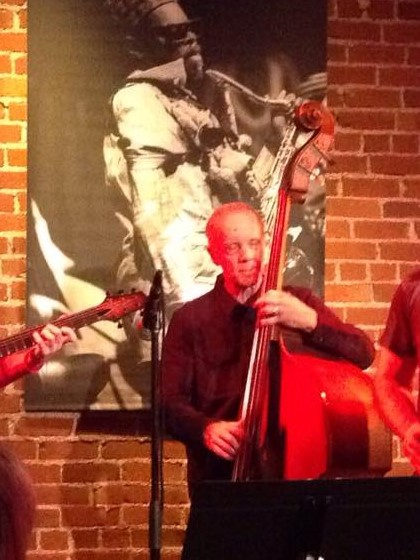
- John Shifflett playing Double Bass at the Cafe Stritch in San Jose, California

Background information
- Born: March 22, 1953; Dubuque, Iowa
- Died: April 27, 2017 (aged 64) San Jose, California
- Genres: Jazz
- Occupation(s): Musician, arranger, educator
- Instrument(s): Double bass, Bass guitar
- Years active: 1970's-2017
- Labels: OA2 Records

John M Shifflett (March 22, 1953 – April 27, 2017) was an American jazz musician, player of the double bass, and an arranger, composer, and educator. His last teaching job was at San Jose State University.

Shifflett was born in Dubuque, Iowa, attended high school at Dubuque where he played trombone and began playing bass (see at Sing Out Dubuque, John Shifflett playing his own composition on bass, January 8th 1971), and graduated in 1976 with a BS degree from Iowa State University. While at the University of Iowa, where he was working on a master's degree, Shifflett was its big band and jazz combo bass player, appearing at festivals such as the Notre Dame Collegiate Jazz Festivals in April 1979 and March 1980.

Shifflett moved to San Jose in 1987, as his wife Bethany was offered a tenure-track position at San Jose State University.

Shifflett played in several notable acts, including Frankie Avalon, the Ringling Bros. and Barnum & Bailey Circus, the American Musical Theatre of San Jose, Dinah Shore, Mel Torme, Jerry Lewis, Dionne Warwick and the Smothers Brothers.

== Discography ==
=== With Anton Schwartz ===
- 2014: Flash Mob (Double bass)
- 2008: Radiant Blue (Double bass)
- 2000: The Slow Lane (Double bass)
- 1998: When Music Calls (Double bass)

=== With Audrey Martin ===
- 2014: Living Room (Double bass)

=== With Gabriela Mendes ===
- 2012: Um Renovo Musical (Double bass)

=== With Jim Norton Collective ===
- 2013: TIME REMEMBERED: COMPOSITIONS OF BILL EVANS (Double bass)

=== With John Stowell/Michael Zilber ===
- 2015: Basement Blues (Double bass)
- 2012: Live Beauty (Double bass)
- 2009: SHOT THROUGH WITH BEAUTY (Double bass)

=== With Christian Tamburr ===
- 2011: Places (Double Bass)

=== With Juliet Green ===
- 2014: Think About That (Double bass)
- 2003: Simple (Double bass)

=== With Larry Dunlap ===
- 2002: Fly With My Love (Double bass)

=== With Kristen Strom ===
- 2012: Sojourn (Double bass)
- 2005: Intention (Double bass)

=== With Aaron Lington Quintet ===
- 2005: Cape Breton (Double bass)

=== With Laurie Antonioli ===
- 2010: American Dreams (Double Bass)
- 2013: SONGS OF SHADOW, SONGS OF LIGHT (Double bass)

=== With Michael Zilber ===
- 2010: BILLY COLLINS PROJECT: ELEVEN ON TURNING TEN (Double bass)

=== With Michael Zilber and Dave Liebman ===
- 2003: Live At The Jazzschool (Double bass)

=== With NLS Trio ===
- 1999: NLS Trio (Double bass)

=== With Paul Tynan & Aaron Lington ===
- 2010: BICOASTAL COLLECTIVE: CHAPTER TWO (Double bass)
- 2009: BICOASTAL COLLECTIVE: CHAPTER ONE (Double bass)

=== With Patrick Cress' Telepathy ===
- 2005: Meditation, Realization (Double bass)

=== With Sandra Marlowe ===
- 2016: A Sweet Wind (Double bass)
- 2012: True Blue (Double bass)

=== With Thomas G. Leslie/ UNLV Wind Orchestra ===
- 2013: Lost Vegas (Double bass)
