= George Benson (saxophonist) =

American jazz musician and educator (1929–2019)

- Birth name: George Franklin Benson
- Born: February 26, 1929
- Origin: Detroit, Michigan, U.S.
- Died: March 9, 2019 (aged 90)
- Genres: Jazz
- Instruments: Saxophone

George Franklin Benson Jr. (February 26, 1929 – March 9, 2019) was an American jazz musician and educator.

== Background ==
Benson served in the United States Army during the Korean War, where he was stationed in Oahu. Benson later worked for the United States Postal Service.

As a session musician, Benson appeared on several Motown sessions in the 1960s, particularly with Marvin Gaye. In 1983, he recorded with J. C. Heard on Heard's first album as leader since 1958, with pianist Claude Black and Canadian bassist Dave Young. Benson co-led an album with Heard in 1988.

Benson died on March 9, 2019.

== Discography ==
As leader/co-leader

- The Key Player
- 1986: Detroit's George Benson Swings & Swings & Swings (Parkwood)
- 1988: Mr. B. with J.C. Heard - Partners in Time (Blind Pig Records)
- 1998: Sax Master (Alembic Arts Label)

As sideman

- 1967: Temptations Live! - The Temptations
- 1970: The Earl of Funk - Earl Van Dyke (Soul Records)
- 1972: New McKinneys Cotton Pickers (Bountiful Label)
- 1978: Take a Look at Yourself - Eddie Russ (Monument Records)
- 1980: The Austin Moro Big Band (Locus Label)
- 1983: The Detroit Jazz Tradition - Alive & Well - JC Heard (Parkwood)
- 1988: Paradise Valley Ducts - Sammy Price (Parkwood)
- 1992: Live in Concert - Wendell Harrison
- 1994: Time Won't Stop - Alma Smith (Valma Music Company)
- 1997: Everybody's Favorite - B.B. Queen
- 1998: Unwind: Creative Healing - various artists
- 1998: Suite William - Bess Bonnier (Noteworks Label)
- The Matt Michaels Trio & Friends - Matt Michaels
- The Eyes of Youth - Dennis Tini
- Live at Sharaku - Miyoko Honma
- A Time to Mourn, A Time to Dance - Chris Collins
- Parisian Protocol - Paul VornHagen
- Swing as You Are - Paul VornHagen
- Exordium - Brad Felt
- A Monk and a Mingus Among Us - Donald Walden
- Jazzscapes - Sheila Landis

== Publications ==
- Jazz Etudes Over Classic Jazz Changes (Houston Publishing)
