= Anton Schwartz =

American jazz saxophonist and composer

- Born: July 16, 1967 (age 58)
- Origin: New York, New York, United States
- Genres: Jazz
- Occupations: saxophonist, composer, educator, educational technologist
- Instrument: Saxophone
- Years active: 1990s-present
- Label: Antonjazz
- Website: antonjazz.com

Anton Schwartz (born July 16, 1967) is an American jazz saxophonist and composer based in Seattle, Washington and Oakland, California.

== Biography ==
Anton Schwartz was born and raised in New York City, the son of Tony Schwartz, the audio documentarian and media theorist, and Reenah Lurie Schwartz. He attended The Dalton School, during which time he studied jazz privately with Warne Marsh and Eddie Daniels, and studied advanced mathematics at New York University and Columbia University. He earned his Bachelor's, Phi Beta Kappa, in Mathematics and Philosophy at Harvard University in 1989, whereupon he entered the Doctoral program in Computer Science at Stanford University on a National Science Foundation Fellowship. There he pursued research in artificial Intelligence, specializing in reinforcement learning. He left the program to become a full-time musician, but not before earning a Master of Science degree along the way.

=== Musician ===
He has released five CDs as a leader, on his own Antonjazz label. They have garnered extensive national radio play and strong reviews. His 2006 CD, Radiant Blue, featured Peter Bernstein (guitar) and Taylor Eigsti (piano) and hit number Four on the U.S. jazz radio charts. His most recent release, Flash Mob, featured Dominick Farinacci (trumpet) and Taylor Eigsti (piano) and enjoyed a long run on the radio Top 10.

Schwartz performs periodically at Yoshi's. One such performance was broadcast nationally in the U.S. as an hourlong episode of NPR's JazzSet.

Recent performances by Schwartz include an hourlong concert of unaccompanied saxophone for the 2013 San Francisco Jazz Festival and as a soloist with the Boston Pops Orchestra at Boston Symphony Hall (2014).

=== Educator & Educational Technologist ===
In 2019, Schwartz released Random Roots, a music practice aid app that utilizes skill acquisition techniques such as varied practice, the spacing effect, the testing effect, context dependency, illusions of mastery and the generation effect. In 2013, he described the practice methodology that inspired the Random Roots app in a blog post of the same name.

In 2021, he released ScaleMate, a music theory app aimed at helping musicians deepen their understanding of scales and musical harmony.

Schwartz is a faculty member of the California Jazz Conservatory in Berkeley, California, has taught frequently at The Stanford Jazz Workshop, and has been Artist-In-Residence at Harvard University and The Brubeck Institute.

== Discography ==
- When Music Calls (1998, Antonjazz)
- The Slow Lane (2000, Antonjazz)
- Holiday Time (2004, Antonjazz)
- Radiant Blue (2006, Antonjazz)
- Flash Mob (2014, Antonjazz)
