= Conservatory of Music, University of the Pacific =

School at University of the Pacific in the US

Coordinates: 37.9796°N 121.3081°W

- Type: Private
- Established: 1878
- Dean: Peter Witte
- Location: Stockton, California, USA
- Campus: Urban
- Website: https://music.pacific.edu/music

The Conservatory of Music (COM) is one of eleven schools and colleges at University of the Pacific. It is located on the school’s main campus in Stockton, California.

COM is the first accredited professional music school on the west coast and a charter member of the National Association of Schools of Music (1928). It offers 11 different degree programs, all of which are accredited by the National Association of Schools of Music.

== History ==
The School of Music was first formed on Pacific's campus in 1878 with 32 students registered. By the 1880s, the school's catalog began listing specific admission requirements for music and awarded its first bachelor of music degrees. A theory of composition degree was added later, with the first student graduating in 1909. Shortly after Pacific's move to its Stockton campus in 1924, the School of Music, renamed the Conservatory of Music, became a member of the National Association of Schools of Music. It continued to expand its degree offerings, adding a music therapy program in 1946 (O'Connell, 1990) and an accredited Bachelor's degree in Music Management in 1983.

== Facilities ==
The conservatory has five main buildings: Faye Spanos Concert Hall, Recital Hall, Rehearsal Hall, Buck Hall, and Owen Hall.

Faye Spanos Concert Hall, the main building in the conservatory, houses an 870-seat concert hall, practice rooms, faculty offices, and the conservatory administration. Built in 1927, it was renovated in 1988 and was seen in one of the Indiana Jones movies.

The 115-seat Recital Hall is a smaller performance space used for student recitals, chamber concerts and master classes.

The 2 rehearsal rooms in the Rehearsal Center are used for band and choral rehearsals. This building also includes one faculty office and the band and orchestra music libraries.

Most of the conservatory’s classes meet in Buck Hall, which includes four classrooms, a conference room, and private studios for many of the faculty. It also includes a 5.1 surround sound system for use in composing and analyzing film music.

Owen Hall houses practice rooms, a digital recording studio, and a computer lab with 19 Apple computers with a variety of software, including Logic Pro 7, Sibelius, Final Cut Studio 2, Photoshop and Dreamweaver. Owen Hall was renovated in 2017 and added additional practice rooms with enhanced acoustic treatment.

Rehearsal space for Jazz Studies is located in the Burns Tower.

== Degrees ==
The Conservatory offers several undergraduate and graduate degrees in the following concentrations:

- Undergraduate students:
  - Bachelor of Science (B.S.) degree:
    - B.S. Music Industry Studies
  - Bachelor of Arts (B.A.) degree:
    - B.A. Music
    - B.A. Music, emphasis in Jazz Studies
    - B.A. Music, emphasis in Music Management
  - Bachelor of Music (B.M.) degree:
    - B.M Music History
    - B.M. Music Management
    - B.M. Music Education
    - B.M. Music Performance
    - B.M. Music Therapy
    - B.M. Music Composition
- Graduate students:
  - M.A./M.Ed. degree:
    - M.A./M.Ed. Music Education
  - M.A. degree:
    - M.A. Music Therapy

== Performing Ensembles ==
  - Bands: Vu Nguyen, director
    - University Concert Band
    - Symphonic Wind Ensemble
  - Choirs: Dr. Brett Epperson, director
    - University Chorus
    - Pacific Singers
  - Jazz Ensembles (affiliated with the Brubeck Institute): Patrick Langham, director
    - Pacific Big Band
    - Various Student-led Combos
    - Pacific Vocal Jazz Ensemble: Randy Sandoli, director
  - Pacific Opera Theatre: James Haffner, director
  - Orchestra: Dr. Nicolas Waldvogel, director
    - University Symphony Orchestra
  - Other Ensembles
    - Pacific Stocktones, student led acappella group
    - 28/78 New Music Ensemble, student led contemporary music group
    - Pacific Heavy Ensemble, student led band/orchestra/choir

== Statistics ==
Enrollment in the conservatory is around 260 students- about 90% undergraduate and 10% graduate. Around 75% of students come from California; other states represented include Hawaii, Oregon, Alaska, Washington, Nevada, Arizona, Colorado, New Mexico, Florida, West Virginia, New Jersey, and New York. International students in the Conservatory come from countries including Japan, China, Korea, and Taiwan.

== Student organizations ==
The following organizations have chapters within the Conservatory:

- Mu Phi Epsilon - Mu Eta Chapter
- Phi Mu Alpha Sinfonia - Beta Pi Chapter
- Sigma Alpha Iota - Eta Omega Chapter
- Pi Kappa Lambda - Delta Chapter
- NAfME Student Chapter (CMEA: Music Education).
- American Choral Directors Association Student Chapter

The conservatory also has a Conservatory Student Senate.

== See also ==
- List of conservatories of music in the United States
