= Introducing Kenny Cox =

Studio album by Kenny Cox
- Released: 1969
- Recorded: December 9, 1968
- Genre: Jazz
- Length: 79:41 (CD Reissue)
- Label: Blue Note
- Producer: Michael Cuscuna

Kenny Cox chronology
Introducing Kenny Cox (1969)	Multidirection (1969)

Introducing Kenny Cox is the debut album by American jazz pianist Kenny Cox featuring performances recorded in 1968 and released on the Blue Note label. The 2000 CD reissue added Cox's second Blue Note album Multidirection as bonus tracks.

== Reception ==
The Allmusic review by Matt Collar awarded the album 4 stars stating "Though well-versed in the traditions of jazz standards and bop, Cox and his ensemble resemble most closely here the classic Miles Davis quintet of the mid- and late '60s. But rather than merely aping Davis, the Contemporary Jazz Quintet had a muscular and urban group sensibility all its own. In that sense, this is fiery, expansive and cerebral post-bop of the highest order".

Professional ratings
Review scores
Source	Rating
Allmusic	4/5 stars

== Track listing ==
All compositions by Kenny Cox except as indicated

1. "Mystique" - 4:44
2. "You" (David Durrah) - 5:28
3. "Trance Dance" - 6:08
4. "Eclipse" (Leon Henderson) - 5:51
5. "Number Four" (Charles Moore) - 10:48
6. "Diahnn" (Henderson) - 8:37
7. "Spellbound" - 5:23 Bonus track on CD reissue
8. "Snuck In" (Moore) - 6:03 Bonus track on CD reissue
9. "Sojourn" - 6:36 Bonus track on CD reissue
10. "Multidirection" (Moore) - 9:57 Bonus track on CD reissue
11. "What Other One" - 4:58 Bonus track on CD reissue
12. "Gravity Point" (Moore) - 5:08 Bonus track on CD reissue

- Recorded at United Sound System, Detroit, Michigan on December 9, 1968 (tracks 1–6) and G.M. Recording Studios, Detroit, Michigan on November 26, 1969 (tracks 7–12).

== Personnel ==
- Kenny Cox - piano
- Charles Moore - trumpet
- Leon Henderson - tenor saxophone
- Ron Brooks - bass
- Danny Spencer - drums
