= Radiant Blue =

Studio album by Anton Schwartz
- Released: August 8, 2006
- Genre: Jazz
- Length: 61:28
- Label: Antonjazz
- Producers: Bud Spangler, Anton Schwartz

Anton Schwartz chronology
Holiday Time (2004)	Radiant Blue (2006)	Flash Mob (2014)

Radiant Blue is the fourth album by jazz saxophonist and composer Anton Schwartz, released in 2006. It garnered a cover story in JazzWeek Magazine, a feature article in the San Francisco Chronicle, received strong reviews and hit number four on the U.S. jazz radio charts.

All compositions are by Anton Schwartz except as noted.

Professional ratings
Review scores
Source	Rating
Allmusic	4.5/5 stars
Jazz Times	(positive)
Jazziz	(positive)
Audiophile Audition	4/5 stars

== Personnel ==
- Anton Schwartz - tenor saxophone
- Taylor Eigsti - piano
- Peter Bernstein - guitar
- John Shifflett - bass
- Tim Bulkley - drums

== Production ==
- Producers: Bud Spangler, Anton Schwartz
- Engineer: Dan Feiszli
- Mixing: Dan Feiszli
- Mastering: Paul Stubblebine
- Arranger: Anton Schwartz
- Graphic design: Martha Cooper
- Photography: Gregory Niemeyer

== Track listing ==
No.	Title	Length
1.	"Phantom Dance"	7:12
2.	"Alligator Strut"	4:48
3.	"Wave (Antonio Carlos Jobim)"	7:39
4.	"Slightly Off Course"	6:20
5.	"Life and Times"	7:43
6.	"Marcel Marceau"	5:21
7.	"Blues for Now"	5:54
8.	"Groundsurge"	6:04
9.	"Hooking Up"	4:50
10.	"Sneaking Suspicion"	5:31
Total length:		61:28
