= Kitty Margolis =

American jazz singer (born 1955)

- Born: November 7, 1955 (age 70); San Mateo, California, U.S.
- Genres: Jazz, Vocal jazz
- Occupations: Singer, record producer
- Years active: 1989–present
- Label: Mad Kat
- Website: www.kittymargolis.com

Kitty Margolis (born November 7, 1955, in San Mateo, California) is an American jazz singer, educator, producer, and journalist. She founded Mad Kat Records in 1988 with vocalist Madeline Eastman and has released 5 albums. Her second album, Evolution (1994), featured Joe Henderson, and Joe Louis Walker, while her follow-up, Straight Up With a Twist (1997) had appearances by Charles Brown and Roy Hargrove. These were followed by Left Coast Life (2001) and Heart & Soul: Live in San Francisco (2004).

== Early life ==
Margolis grew up in the San Francisco Bay Area exposed to a wide range of music influences and began playing guitar at age 12 inspired by Joni Mitchell, Bonnie Raitt, folk, country, blues and the eclectic concerts she attended at The Fillmore and Winterland.

== Career ==
Margolis began playing gigs while attending Harvard University in the mid-1970s as a singer and rhythm guitarist in a western-swing band. She began to study jazz after she attended a "life altering" concert by Rahsaan Roland Kirk at New York's Village Vanguard. She eventually returned to San Francisco where she attended San Francisco State University, learning recording engineering and studying under saxophonists John Handy and Hal Stein. Margolis was the first woman to attend Stein's improvisation class, and eventually she took over his weekly gig at Peta's in San Francisco's North Beach neighborhood. The regular gig launched Margolis's professional career in 1978.

In 1988 Kitty Margolis and Madeline Eastman co-founded the first women-owned label on the West Coast, Mad-Kat Records, in order to make their own music with no commercial or artistic constraints.

In 1997, Margolis won the BAM Bammie award for outstanding jazz vocalist after being nominated for her album Evolution in 1994. She was nominated for the Soul Train "Lady of Soul" Award in 1999, and has been recognized in the DownBeat Critics' Poll numerous times. Jazz critic Stanley Crouch observed that "Kitty Margolis is an original who has made the heritage of all the great jazz singers her own... She is, as they say, 'the real thing.'"

Margolis has toured extensively, including appearances at The Kennedy Center, Holland's North Sea Jazz Festival, The Boston Pops, the Monterey Jazz Festival, the Telluride Jazz Festival, the Lionel Hampton Jazz Festival, London's Royal Festival Hall, and the San Francisco Jazz Festival. In 2022 she performed at Ronnie Scott's in London as part of a celebration of her former bandmate and close friend, the late saxophonist, composer, and arranger Pee Wee Ellis. Also in 2022, she was the first jazz artist to perform at the newly renovated and re-opened Presidio Theater in San Francisco.

She was a VJ for BET on Jazz and was featured on Marian McPartland's syndicated radio show "Piano Jazz" in 2006. In 2005 she was the subject of a one-hour radio program, Melanie O'Reilly's "Jazz Across the Bay" on Ireland's National radio station RTE; the show was reformatted and rebroadcast on KCSM in 2022.

Margolis has worked with various non-profit organizations. She served as Solo Jazz Vocal representative on the International Association of Jazz Educators (IAJE) Resource Team for 8 years. In 2009 she participated on the National Endowment for the Arts (NEA) "Jazz Masters Live" panel. In 2011 she co-moderated a panel "Exploring the Recording Artist/Record Producer Relationship: A Dialogue About Creative Synergy" with Concord Records VP Nick Phillips at the Jazz Education Network (JEN) Conference in New Orleans. She has also been a guest lecturer at many universities and high schools.

Margolis served on the national board of trustees of The Recording Academy (Grammys) from 2011 through 2015, after serving on the executive committee of the Recording Academy's San Francisco chapter board from 2008 through 2010. She is on the advisory board of Music in Schools Today (MuST), which serves over 10,000 children and youth annually advocating to restore music as an essential principle of primary education. Margolis is also in the Circle of Advisors for "Bread & Roses Presents," an organization that provides live music and the performing arts to individuals in institutional settings in the San Francisco Bay Area.

Margolis and her husband, Alfonso Montuori Ph.D., also teach educational seminars that explore "collaborative creativity" and the "improvisational mindset" of jazz artists for non-musical environments such as the workplace, which has been presented at the Esalen Institute, the Italian energy company Enel, and UCSF School of Medicine.

In 2021 Margolis became a contributing writer to San Francisco's Nob Hill Gazette, writing about music and culture.

== Recordings ==
=== Live at the Jazz Workshop ===
Margolis's first album Live at the Jazz Workshop was recorded in 1988 at the Jazz Workshop in San Francisco for the KJAZ radio show See's Sunday Night. The concert featured Al Plank on piano, Scott Steed on bass and Vince Lateano on drums. Margolis put the recording out on Mad-Kat Records, the independent label she created with fellow vocalist Madeline Eastman. The album established her as an important new voice in jazz, leading Lionel Hampton to state that Margolis was "the next great jazz voice".

=== Evolution ===
Her second album, released in 1994, made extensive use of the possibilities of studio recording. The album included guest appearances by Joe Henderson blues guitarist Joe Louis Walker, Gaylord Birch, Kenny Brooks, Joyce Cooling, Dick Hindman, and David Rokeach. The album includes new lyrics for Wayne Shorter's song "Footprints" written by Margolis. The San Francisco Examiner called Evolution "the best jazz-vocal disc in years" and All About Jazz's review of the album said "her versatility brings to mind Ella Fitzgerald and Carmen McRae".

=== Straight Up With a Twist ===
Straight Up With A Twist was released in 1997 and included a duet, "Wouldn't It be Loverly," with blues legend Charles Brown. Other collaborators on the album included Roy Hargrove, Kenny Brooks, Joyce Cooling and Jay Wagner. DownBeat gave the release four stars, calling it "one of the most compelling vocal collections of the year", and it was listed in 1998's MusicHound Jazz: the essential album guide.

=== Left Coast Life ===
Margolis's 2001 album explored some of the challenges San Francisco was facing in the Dot-com bubble with her own composition "You Just Might Get It," as well as covers of Pink Floyd's "Money" and Tom Waits's "Take it With Me". Guests included Eric Crystal on sax, Steve Erquiaga on guitar, and guitarist Joyce Cooling. All About Jazz wrote that "Left Coast Life is a major jazz vocal release", All Music called it a "nonstop program of sweet, soulful, and swinging music," and the International Association for Jazz Education Journal found it to be "The #1 Vocal Jazz CD of 2001".

=== Heart & Soul (Live In San Francisco) ===
Guests for Margolis's fifth album, released in 2004, included Michael Bluestein of Foreigner, Allison Miller, and Jon Evans. The album was named one of the top 10 CDs of 2004 by Newsday, JazzTimes wrote that Margolis was "an equally potent blend of class, integrity and chutzpah", and the All Music Guide review wrote that Margolis "commands instant attention to every word she sings on Heart & Soul: Live in San Francisco and is quite, quite glorious".

== Discography ==
Year	Title	Label
1989	Live at the Jazz Workshop	Mad Kat
1993	Evolution	Mad Kat
1997	Straight Up with a Twist	Mad Kat
2001	Left Coast Life	Mad Kat
2004	Heart & Soul: Live in San Francisco	Mad Kat
