= Multidirection =

Studio album by Kenny Cox
- Released: 1969
- Recorded: November 26, 1969
- Genre: Jazz
- Length: 38:05
- Label: Blue Note
- Producer: Francis Wolff

Kenny Cox chronology
Introducing Kenny Cox (1968)	Multidirection (1969)

Multidirection is the second album by American jazz pianist Kenny Cox featuring performances recorded in 1969 and released on the Blue Note label. The album was reissued as bonus tracks with Cox's first Blue Note album Introducing Kenny Cox.

== Reception ==
The Allmusic review by Brandon Burke awarded the album 4 stars stating "Multidirection has as much in common with Blue Note's mildly avant-garde releases of the early '60s as it does the soul-based output typical of 1969. In this sense, one could compare it to Andrew Hill's Grass Roots or Jackie McLean's Jacknife, as soulful yet mildly dissonant hard bop is the order of the day here as well".

Professional ratings
Review scores
Source	Rating
Allmusic	4/5 stars

== Track listing ==
All compositions by Kenny Cox except as indicated

1. "Spellbound" - 5:23
2. "Snuck In" (Charles Moore) - 6:03
3. "Sojourn" - 6:36
4. "Multidirection" (Moore) - 9:57
5. "What Other One" - 4:58
6. "Gravity Point" (Moore) - 5:08

- Recorded at G.M. Recording Studios, Detroit, Michigan on November 26, 1969

== Personnel ==
- Kenny Cox - piano
- Charles Moore - trumpet
- Leon Henderson - tenor saxophone
- Ron Brooks - bass
- Danny Spencer - drums
