= San Francisco Jazz Festival =

American annual music festival

- Genre: Jazz, blues, Latin jazz, R&B
- Dates: October, November
- Locations: San Francisco, California
- Coordinates: 37°47′N 122°25′W
- Years active: 1983–present
- Website: sfjazz.org

San Francisco Jazz Festival is an annual three-week music festival produced by SFJAZZ, a non-profit organization dedicated to jazz and jazz education.

== Notable performers ==
=== 1995 ===
Jack DeJohnette, Keith Jarrett, Christian McBride, Charles McPherson, Modern Jazz Quartet, James Moody, Gary Peacock, Wayne Shorter, Phil Woods

=== 1996 ===
Dee Dee Bridgewater, Ruth Brown, John Lee Hooker, Diana Krall, John McLaughlin, Max Roach, Sonny Rollins, George Shearing, David Sanborn

=== 1997 ===
Joe Williams, Nancy Wilson

=== 1998 ===
Geri Allen, Marc Anthony, Kenny Barron, Andy Bey, Rosemary Clooney, Dave Frishberg, Tom Harrell, Corey Harris, Fred Hersch, Al Jarreau, Diana Krall, Ivan Lins, Kevin Mahogany, Joshua Redman, David Sanchez, John Zorn

=== 1999 ===
Patricia Barber, Louie Bellson, Chick Corea, Joey DeFrancesco, Charlie Haden, Jimmy Smith, Gerald Wilson

=== 2000 ===
Orquesta Aragón, Ruth Brown, Celia Cruz, Lee Konitz, Joe Lovano, Russell Malone, Bobby McFerrin, Eliades Ochoa, Lou Rawls, Bud Shank, Cecil Taylor, McCoy Tyner, Toots Thielemans

=== 2001 ===
Kenny Barron, Joanne Brackeen, Regina Carter, Issac Delgado, Etta James, Pharoah Sanders, Bobby Short, Mary Stallings

=== 2002 ===
John Abercrombie, Toshiko Akiyoshi, Geri Allen, Vicente Amigo, Patricia Barber, Bill Charlap, Ornette Coleman, Kurt Elling Merle Haggard, Billy Hart, Shirley Horn, Bobby Hutcherson, Ahmad Jamal, Marc Johnson, Charles Lloyd, Branford Marsalis, Ellis Marsalis Jr., Bobby McFerrin, Jane Monheit, Wayne Shorter, McCoy Tyner

=== 2003 ===
Ruth Brown, Herbie Hancock, Dave Holland, Etta James, Ramsey Lewis, Maria Muldaur, Enrico Rava, Lavay Smith, Mavis Staples, Cecil Taylor, McCoy Tyner, Nancy Wilson

=== 2004 ===
Brian Blade, Ruth Brown, Bobby Hutcherson, Etta James, Nicholas Payton, Joshua Redman, Josh Roseman, Renee Rosnes, Mary Stallings, Miguel Zenon,

=== 2005 ===
Keren Ann, Eva Ayllón, Ornette Coleman, Barbara Cook, Paquito D'Rivera, Eldar Djangirov, Lalah Hathaway, Etta James, Yusef Lateef, Abbey Lincoln, Madeleine Peyroux, Virginia Rodrigues, Poncho Sanchez, Toots Thielemans, Tierney Sutton,

=== 2006 ===
Geri Allen, Ornette Coleman, Eldar Djangirov, Paquito D'Rivera, Lalah Hathaway, Etta James, Keith Jarrett, Abbey Lincoln, Madeleine Peyroux, Poncho Sanchez, Mary Stallings, Tierney Sutton,

=== 2007 ===
John Abercrombie, Dee Dee Bridgewater, Ornette Coleman, Kurt Elling, Pete Escovedo, Herbie Hancock, Ahmad Jamal, Jason Moran, Pharoah Sanders, Anoushka Shankar, Ravi Shankar, Sara Tavares, Caetano Veloso

=== 2017 ===
Vicente Amigo, Dee Dee Bridgewater, Ravi Coltrane, Cosa Nostra Strings, Pharoah Sanders, Steve McQuarry

=== 2018 ===
Ahmad Jamal, Arturo Sandoval, Marcus Miller, Dave Holland, Chris Potter, Monsieur Perine, Chester Thompson, Hot Club of San Francisco, San Francisco String Trio, Irma Thomas, Kendrick Scott, Sergio Mendes, Nate Wooley, Ken Vandermark, Tuck And Patti, Jamison Ross, Brian Blade, Jeff Parker, Lea Delaria, Broken Shadows, Julian Lage, Thumbscrew, Marius Neset, Amadou & Mariam, George Cole, Zakir Hussain, Soweto Kinch, The Juju Exchange w/ Nico Segal
