= Joe Gilman =

- Born: Joseph Alan Gilman; June 27, 1962 (age 63); Sacramento, California, U.S.
- Genres: Jazz
- Occupations: Musician, teacher
- Instrument: Piano
- Years active: 1992–present
- Labels: Artful Balance, Timeless, Sunnyside, Capri
- Website: www.joegilman.com

Joseph Alan Gilman (born June 27, 1962) is an American jazz pianist from Sacramento, California. He has taught at American River College and Sacramento State University in Sacramento and the Brubeck Institute in Stockton, California.

== Background ==
Gilman began studying piano at the age of seven and later earned degrees in piano performance and jazz studies at Indiana University, a master's degree in jazz and the contemporary media from the Eastman School of Music, and a doctorate in education from the University of Sarasota. He studied with Yuriy Oliynyk, Jerry Murphy, Frank Wasko, David Baker, James Tocco, Karen Shaw, Bill Dobbins, and Rayburn Wright.

In 1992 he began directing the music theory and jazz studies programs at American River College, and released the album Treasure Chest, with Joe Henderson, Jeff "Tain" Watts, and Robert Hurst.

In 1997, Gilman founded Capital Jazz Project, a Sacramento-based nonprofit organization which features thematic jazz presentations.

In 1998 and 2000, Gilman toured twelve countries on the African continent as a part of the Kennedy Center/USIA Jazz Ambassador program. The tour included regular performances with jazz guitarist Steve Homan to foreign dignitaries and resident audiences, performing with local musicians, and offering lectures and clinics to aspiring jazz performers.

From 1997 to 2004, Gilman was a regular finalist in The Great American Jazz Piano Competition in Jacksonville, Florida. He was the grand prize winner in 2004.

In 2004, Gilman began a series of albums for Sunnyside Records and Capri Records featuring interpretations of the music of Dave Brubeck and Stevie Wonder. His later recordings presented musical interpretations of Contemporary American painters (Americanvas) and the sketches of M.C. Escher (Relativity).

From 2005–2012, Gilman was music director of the Brubeck Institute in Stockton, California, and artist in residence from 2012–2014.

In 2006, Gilman became a regular accompanist to jazz vibraphonist Bobby Hutcherson, and has since toured the Blue Note jazz clubs in Japan, Dizzy's Club Coca-Cola and Birdland in New York, Jazz Alley and The Triple Door in Seattle, Yoshi's in Oakland and San Francisco, the Jazz Bakery in Los Angeles, and jazz festivals such as Estoria (Portugal) Pescara and Umbria (Italy), Jazz Baltica (Germany), Sedona (Arizona), and Boston.

== Musical influences ==
Although originally influenced by ragtime music, Gilman in his teens discovered jazz pianist Dave Brubeck. Later he listened to the recordings of Oscar Peterson, Herbie Hancock, Chick Corea, McCoy Tyner, John Coltrane, and Miles Davis. Because of his classical studies, Gilman has also incorporated the concepts of Igor Stravinsky and Sergei Prokofiev.

== Discography ==
- 1987 Joe Gilman (Artful Balance)
- 1988 Artfully Beatles (Artful Balance)
- 1990 Here, There, and Everywhere (Artful Balance)
- 1992 Treasure Chest (Timeless)
- 2000 Duality with Steve Homan (Nefertiti)
- 2004 Time Again; Brubeck Revisited Vol. 1 (Sunnyside)
- 2004 Claude Bolling Suites 1 and 2 for flute and jazz piano trio (Cantilena)
- 2005 Time Again; Brubeck Revisited Vol. 2 (Sunnyside)
- 2006 View So Tender; Wonder Revisited Vol. 1 (Capri)
- 2007 View So Tender; Wonder Revisited Vol. 2 (Capri)
- 2009 Wise One with Bobby Hutcherson (Kind of Blue)
- 2010 Americanvas (Capri)
- 2012 Relativity (Capri)

== Awards and honors ==
- 1997 Great American Jazz Piano Competition; 1st runner-up
- 1998 Great American Jazz Piano Competition; 2nd Place
- 2000 Great American Jazz Piano Competition; 3rd Place
- 2002 Great American Jazz Piano Competition; 2nd Place
- 2004 Great American Jazz Piano Competition; Grand Prize Winner
- 2005 Brubeck Scholar Award (University of the Pacific)
