= Doug Hammond =

American drummer

- Born: December 26, 1942 (age 83)
- Genres: Jazz • Avant-garde jazz • spoken word
- Instrument: Drums

Doug Hammond (born December 26, 1942) is a blues, jazz, and Afro-American traditional drummer, composer, poet, producer, and professor. His first major release was Reflections in the Sea of Nurnen on Tribe Records in 1975.

== Career ==
He has worked with musicians including Earl Hooker, Sonny Rollins, Charles Mingus, Sammy Price, Donald Byrd, Wolfgang Dauner, Ornette Coleman, Steve Coleman, Nina Simone, Betty Carter, Marion Williams, Paquito D'Rivera, Arnett Cobb, James Blood Ulmer, Arthur Blythe, Joe Henderson, Lowell Fulson, Chris Hinze and the Hilversum Symphony.

In 2010 Doug Hammond wrote and conducted "Acknowledgement Suite" with Dwight Adams, Jean Toussaint, Roman Filiú, Howard Curtis, Wendell Harrison, Dick Griffin, Stéphane Payen, Kirk Lightsey and Aaron James.

He was a professor at the Anton Bruckner Private University in Linz.

His work has been filmed in a documentary Sparkle of Inspiration by the Austrian director Dieter Strauch released during the Crossing Europe Film Festival in Linz in 2016.

== Personal life ==
He lives and works in Linz, Austria.

== Discography ==
- Reflections in the Sea of Nurnen with David Durrah (Tribe, 1975; Pony Canyon, 2004)
- Ellipse with Karen Joseph (Idibib, 1976)
- Folks (Idibib, 1980)
- Alone (Scarecrow, 1982)
- Spaces (Idibib, 1982; Rebel-X/DIW, 1992) with Steve Coleman among others
- and Mo' Folks: We People (Idibib, 1989) with Regina Carter among others
- Perspiciuty (L+R, 1991) Trio with Steve Coleman
- It's Born (JPC, 1996)
- Singing Smiles (Idibib, 2005)
- A Real Deal (Heavenly Sweetness, 2007)
- It's Now (Idibib, 2010)
- New Beginning (Blue Marge, 2010)

With Charles Mingus

- Mingus Moves (Atlantic, 1973)

With Lonnie Liston Smith

- Cosmic Funk (Flying Dutchman, 1974)
