= Patrick J. Miller =

American computer scientist

Patrick J. Miller is a computer scientist and high performance parallel applications developer with a Ph.D. in computer science from University of California, Davis, in run-time error detection and correction. Until recently he was with Lawrence Livermore National Laboratory.

He is most noted for building and assembling the largest temporary supercomputer in the world, FlashMob I, in an attempt to break into the Top 500 list of supercomputers with students from his "Do-it-yourself Supercomputing" class at the University of San Francisco in April 2004. This effort was featured on the front page of the New York Times on February 23, 2004.

In September 2005, he and others at Bryn Mawr recreated a FlashMob Supercomputer to calculate the value of pi to 15,000 digits and performed 15,800 steps to simulate the unfolding of a protein interacting with an anthrax toxin.

More recently he is the author of the popular pyMPI distributed parallel version of the Python programming language.

Miller used to work as a software developer for Aurora Innovation in Palo Alto, California.

Since 2022, Miller has worked as a Computer Science lecturer at the University of California, Riverside.
