= The Acoustic Warriors =

The Acoustic Warriors was a band formed by rhythm guitarist Dan Hicks in the early 1990s.

In San Francisco from 1968 to 1973, Hicks led Dan Hicks and the Hot Licks, a band that never used electric instruments and rarely used drums. The band reunited in 1990, then appeared on the television show Austin City Limits two years later. The reunion introduced the Acoustic Warriors, a combination of folk, swing, jazz, and country music that included Brian Godchaux on violin and mandolin, Paul Mehling on guitar, and Richard Saunders on double bass.

Others to play with the Acoustic Warriors included Paul Robinson on guitar, Stevie Blacke on mandolin, Alex Baum on bass, and Jim Boggio on accordion. This band recorded the album Shootin' Straight (Private Music, 1994). Hicks returned to using the Hot Licks name in 2000.
