= Madeline Eastman =

American jazz singer

- Birth name: Madeline Louise Eastman
- Born: June 27, 1954 (age 70); San Francisco, California, U.S.
- Genres: Jazz
- Occupation(s): Singer, producer, educator
- Years active: 1990–present
- Labels: Mad Kat
- Website: madelineeastman.com

Madeline Louise Eastman (born June 27, 1954) is an American jazz singer.

At 18, while watching the movie Lady Sings the Blues Eastman became enchanted with Diana Ross's portrayal of vocalist Billie Holiday. Not yet realizing how serious and dedicated she would need to be, Eastman considered becoming a jazz singer. She has listened to Miles Davis, particularly his 1960s quintet with Wayne Shorter, Herbie Hancock, Ron Carter, and Tony Williams. Among vocalists, her prime inspiration is Carmen McRae, in addition to Ella Fitzgerald and Sarah Vaughan. She began performing publicly in 1974 at Shenanigan's in Palo Alto. She studied with jazz guitarist George Barnes (musician) shortly before he died in 1977.

Eastman has sung in Japan, Finland, New York City, San Francisco, and at the Cotati Jazz Festival, Monterey Jazz Festival, and the Glasgow Jazz Festival. She has taught at the Stanford Jazz Workshop and at the Jazzschool in Berkeley, California.

Eastman and vocalist Kitty Margolis started the record label Mad Kat. She has recorded with pianists Cedar Walton and Kenny Barron, saxophonist Phil Woods, bassist Rufus Reid, and drummer Tony Williams.

In 2004, Eastman won third place in the Down Beat magazine Readers' Poll for Best Female Jazz Vocalist and made the list of Talent Deserving Wider Recognition in the Critics' Poll.

== Discography ==
Year	Title	Genre	Label
1990	Point of Departure	Jazz	Mad Kat
1991	Mad About Madeline!	Jazz	Mad Kat
1994	Art Attack	Jazz	Mad Kat
2001	BARE, A Collection of Ballads	Jazz	Mad Kat
2003	The Speed of Life	Jazz	Mad Kat
2008	Can You Hear Me Now? LIVE	Jazz	Mad Kat
2012	A Quiet Thing	Jazz	Mad Kat
