= Hot Club of San Francisco =

American gypsy jazz band

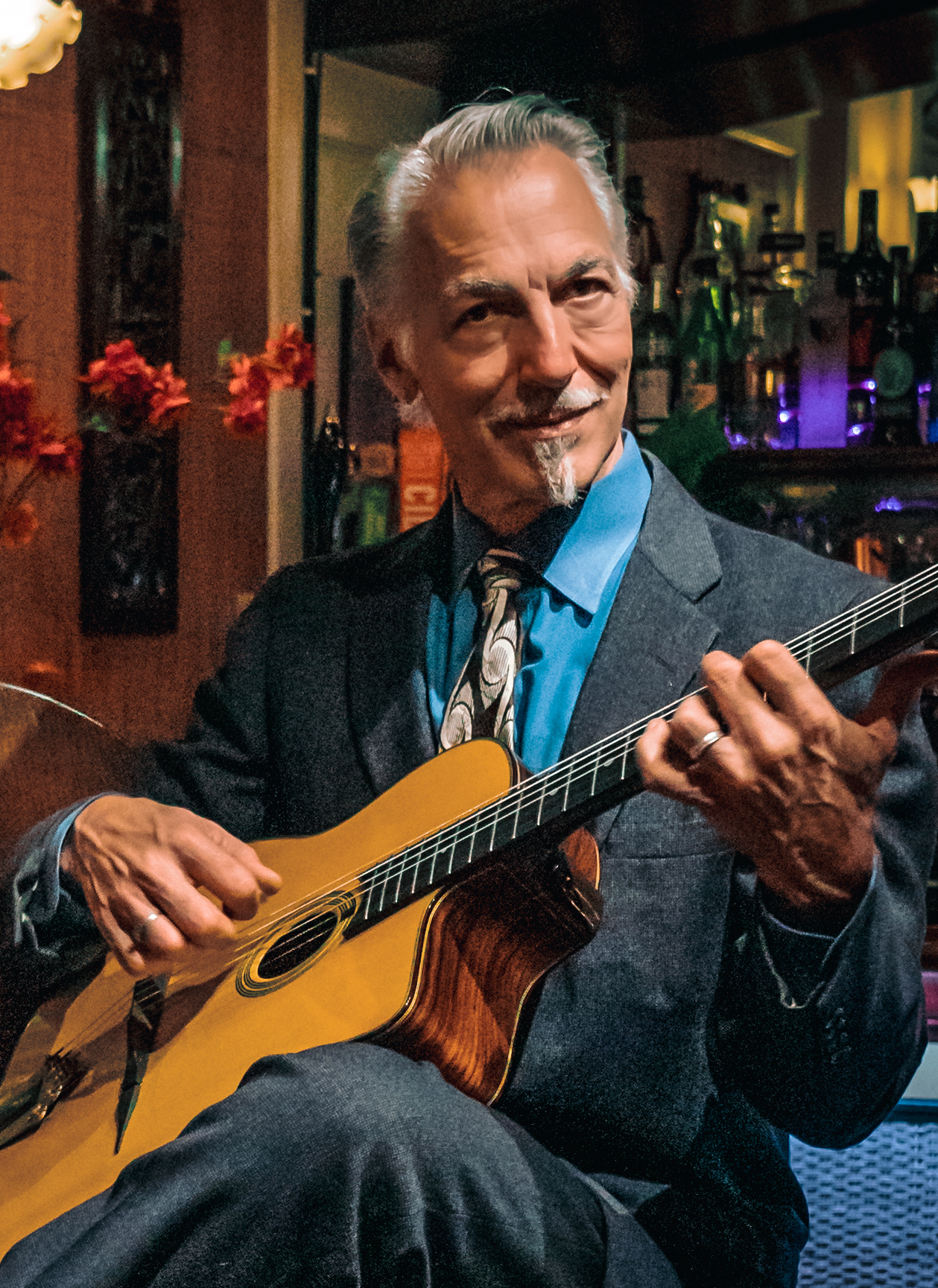
- Paul Mehling, Leader of the Hot Club of San Francisco

Background information
- Origin: San Francisco, California
- Genre: Gypsy jazz
- Years active: 1989–present
- Labels: Hot Club Records, Azica, Lost Wax, Panda Digital, Clarity Recordings, Reference Recordings
- Members: Paul Mehling; Evan Price; Dexter Williams; Nelsen Hutchison; Jordan Samuels
- Website: hotclubsf.com

The Hot Club of San Francisco is an American gypsy jazz band. Led by guitarist, songwriter, and arranger Paul 'Pazzo' Mehling, the group uses the instrumentation of violin, bass, and guitars from Django Reinhardt and Stephane Grappelli’s Quintette du Hot Club de France and performs arrangements of gypsy jazz standards, pop songs, and original compositions by Mehling. The Hot Club of San Francisco includes violinist Evan Price, the vocals of various members, and a swing rhythm section. In the book, Django Reinhardt and the Illustrated History of Gypsy Jazz, Michael Dregni refers to the Hot Club of San Francisco as "one of the first American gypsy jazz bands."

== Biography ==
Mehling was exposed to the music of Django Reinhardt music at a young age through his father's record collection. As a teenager Mehling was inspired by seeing Dan Hicks and His Hot Licks, who drew on the music of Django Reinhardt, and by David Grisman’s Dawg Music, a blend of swing and bluegrass. Early in his career Mehling performed with the Abalone Stompers, a New Orleans style traditional Dixieland jazz band, freelanced with the Santa Cruz Symphony, played with the Magnolia Jazz Band, and formed his first Gypsy jazz band, The Hot Club of Friends. Mehling later traveled to Paris to further develop his gypsy jazz guitar technique and feel with Django-style guitarist Serge Krief. Mehling has stated that Krief's emphasis on the importance of emotion, mystery, and romance in gypsy music had a lasting impact on his development as a musician. In the late 1980s and early 1990s Mehling joined Dan Hicks' band, The Acoustic Warriors, appearing with them on the PBS show Austin City Limits.

== Works and recognition ==
Nationally broadcast performances of the HCSF include the Public Radio Exchange's WoodSongs Old-Time Radio Hour series, and Stanford Libraries' Riverwalk Collection. A story on NPR station KQED-FM on the Hot Club of San Francisco referred to Mehling as "one of the Godfathers of the Gypsy jazz revival". The Hot Club of San Francisco has released 16 albums, six of which were released on Mehling's Hot Club Records label. The group was the first American band invited to perform at the Festival Django Reinhardt in Samois sur Seine, in 2000. Mehling appeared in the 2005 film Jeremy Cohen and Friends Celebrate Joe Venuti, and performed on the soundtrack of the 2014 film My Old Lady.

== Discography ==
Released	Title	Label	Notes
1993	The Hot Club of San Francisco	Clarity Recordings	Includes Maria Muldaur, Barbara Dane, and other San Francisco Bay Area guest artists. The album features tenor saxophone, soprano saxophone, and flute in addition to violin, guitars, and bass. Scott Yanow of Allmusic gave the album four stars out of five and called the album an "impressive debut."
1994	QHCSF		
1996	LIVE MCMV	Hot Club Records	
1997	Swing This	Hot Club Records	Includes arrangements of pop songs, classical pieces, modern jazz tunes, and original compositions by Mehling and three violinists on different tracks including Julian Smedley, Jenny Scheinman and Jeremy Cohen.
1999	The Lady in Red	Clarity Recordings	
2000	Claire de Lune	Hot Club Records	
2002	Veronica	Panda Digital	
2004	Be That Way	Panda Digital	All original compositions by Mehling.
2005	Postcards from Gypsyland	Lost Wax	This album features tangos, waltzes, small duets and large orchestral ensembles and includes original compositions by Levy, Mehling, and Evan Price. Scott Yanow of AllMusic.com awarded the album 4 1/2 stars out of five.
2007	Yerba Buena Bounce	Reference Recordings	Recorded at Fantasy studios in Berkeley, California. This album features David Grisman on three tracks and was awarded 4 1/2 stars out of five by Ken Dryden of AllMusic.
2008	Bohemian Maestro: Django Reinhardt & the Impressionists	Azica Records	Features original compositions and arrangements and of pieces by Django Reinhardt and classical composers including Debussy, Poulenc, and Villa-Lobos.
2009	Hot Club Cool Yule	Azica Records	Gypsy jazz holiday recording.
2012	LIVE at Yoshi's San Francisco	Azica Records	Prominently features the voice of Isabelle Fontaine.
2015	John Paul George & Django	Hot Club Records	Includes arrangements of Beatles songs performed in the style of Django Reindhart's Quintette of the Hot Club of Paris.
2019	Hot Club 30 Years	Hot Club Records	Compilation album
2024	Original Gadjo	Hot Club Records	Features all original tunes composed by various members of the quintet.
