= Tangled Tales (album) =

Studio album by Dan Hicks
- Released: March 24, 2009
- Genre: Bluegrass music, jazz
- Label: Surfdog Records

Dan Hicks chronology
Selected Shorts (2004)	Tangled Tales (2009)	Crazy for Christmas (2011)

Tangled Tales is an album by Dan Hicks, released on March 24, 2009, on Surfdog Records. It was recorded along with Hicks' longtime band, billed as "His Hot Licks". It consists of two new songs, as well as reworkings of Hicks' older originals and several covers. The title track consists entirely of scatting, and was suggested by the owner of Surf Dog Records.

Professional ratings
Review scores
Source	Rating
AllMusic	4/5 stars
PopMatters	(7/10)
JazzTimes	(favorable)
Washington Post	(favorable)
Robert Christgau	(choice cut)

== Track listing ==
All tracks composed by Dan Hicks; except where indicated.

1. "Who Are You?"
2. "The Diplomat"
3. "Savin' My Lovin'"
4. "The Blues My Naughty Baby Gave to Me" (Arthur N. Swanstone, C. Morgan, Charles R. McCarron)
5. "Song for My Father" (Horace Silver, Ellen May Shashoyan)
6. "The Rounder"
7. "13-D"
8. "Ragtime Cowboy Joe" (Grant Clark, Lewis F. Muir, Maurice Abrahams)
9. "A Magician"
10. "Subterranean Homesick Blues" (Bob Dylan)
11. "Tangled Tales"
12. "Let It Simmer!"
