= List of conservatories of music in the United States =

Below is a list of degree-granting music institutions of higher learning in the United States. As of 2017, in the United States, there were 650 degree-granting institutions of higher learning that were accredited by the National Association of Schools of Music. There are also several notable institutions of higher learning that are – for various reasons, by choice or otherwise – not accredited by NASM.

== Private institutions ==
=== Independent conservatories of music ===
- Berklee College of Music, Boston
- Cleveland Institute of Music
- The Curtis Institute of Music, Philadelphia
- Interlochen Arts Academy, Interlochen, Michigan
- Manhattan School of Music, New York
- New England Conservatory, Boston
- San Francisco Conservatory of Music
- VanderCook College of Music, Chicago

=== Independent for-profit conservatories of music ===
- McNally Smith College of Music, Saint Paul, Minnesota (Shut down as of 2018)
- Musicians Institute, Los Angeles

=== Liberal arts colleges, secular ===
- Baldwin Wallace Conservatory of Music Berea, Ohio
- Bard College Conservatory of Music, Annandale-on-Hudson, New York
- Ithaca College School of Music, Ithaca, New York
- Lawrence University Conservatory of Music, Appleton, Wisconsin
- Longy School of Music (recently merged with Bard College)
- Oberlin Conservatory of Music (Oberlin College), Oberlin, Ohio

=== Liberal arts colleges, non-secular ===
- Birmingham–Southern Conservatory of Fine and Performing Arts (United Methodist)
- Concordia College Conservatory (Lutheran Church–Missouri Synod), Bronxville, New York
- Saint Mary-of-the-Woods Conservatory of Music (Catholic, Sisters of Providence of Saint Mary-of-the-Woods), Saint Mary-of-the-Woods, Indiana
- Gettysburg College, Sunderman Conservatory of Music, Gettysburg, Pennsylvania
- Wheaton College, Conservatory of Music, Wheaton, Illinois

=== Schools of the Arts ===
- Boston Conservatory at Berklee, Boston
- Colburn School, Los Angeles
- Cornish College of the Arts, Seattle
- Juilliard School, New York City
- University of the Arts, Philadelphia

=== Private universities, secular ===
- Boston University College of Fine Arts
- Carnegie Mellon School of Music, Pittsburgh
- Eastman School of Music (University of Rochester)
- Frost School of Music (University of Miami), Coral Gables, Florida
- The Hartt School (University of Hartford)
- Lamont School of Music (University of Denver), Denver, Colorado
- Lynn University Conservatory of Music, Boca Raton, Florida
- Mannes School of Music (The New School), New York City
- The Music Conservatory of Chicago College of Performing Arts (Roosevelt University), Chicago
- The New School for Jazz and Contemporary Music (The New School), New York City
- Northwestern University, Bienen School of Music, Evanston, Illinois
- Peabody Institute (Johns Hopkins University), Baltimore
- Point Park Conservatory of Performing Arts, Pittsburgh
- Shepherd School of Music (Rice University), Houston
- University of the Pacific, Conservatory of Music, Stockton, California
- USC Thornton School of Music, University Park, Los Angeles
- Vanderbilt University, Blair School of Music (undergraduate only), Nashville
- Westminster Choir College (Rider University), Princeton
- Wilkes University Conservatory of Music, Wilkes-Barre, Pennsylvania
- Syracuse University, Setnor School of Music
- Yale School of Music, New Haven, Connecticut

=== Private universities, non-secular ===
- Anderson University Conservatory of Music (Southern Baptist Convention), Anderson, South Carolina^{a}
- Biola University Conservatory of Music (non-denominational, Evangelical Christian), La Mirada, California
- Brigham Young University, School of Music (Church of Jesus Christ of Latter-day Saints), Provo, Utah
- Capital University Conservatory of Music (Evangelical Lutheran Church in America), Bexley, Ohio
- Chapman University Conservatory of Music (Christian Church, Disciples of Christ), Orange, California
- DePaul School of Music (DePaul University), Chicago, Illinois
- Duquesne University, Mary Pappert School of Music (Catholic Church), Pittsburgh, Pennsylvania
- Shenandoah University Conservatory (United Methodist Church), Winchester, Virginia
- University of Mary Hardin–Baylor Conservatory of Music, Belton, Texas
- (Note: Anderson University announced the planned June 1, 2026 establishment of the Conservatory of Music on April 11, 2026.)^{a}

== Public institutions ==
=== Pre-college public schools of the art ===
- Oakland Public Conservatory of Music, Oakland, CA

=== Public universities ===
City University of New York constituents
- Brooklyn College Conservatory of Music
State University of New York constituents
- State University of New York at Purchase Conservatory of Music, Purchase
- State University of New York at Fredonia, Fredonia School of Music, Fredonia
- State University of New York at Potsdam, Crane School of Music, Potsdam

- Bob Cole Conservatory of Music (California State University, Long Beach)
- Cadek Conservatory (University of Tennessee), Knoxville
- FSU College of Music, Tallahassee
- Indiana University Bloomington, Jacobs School of Music
- Kean University Conservatory of Music
- Lionel Hampton School of Music (University of Idaho), Moscow
- LSU School of Music, Baton Rouge
- State University of New York at Potsdam, Crane School of Music
- UCLA Herb Alpert School of Music
- University of Cincinnati – College-Conservatory of Music
- University of Colorado-Boulder College of Music
- University of Maryland School of Music
- University of Michigan School of Music, Theatre & Dance, Ann Arbor
- University of Missouri–Kansas City Conservatory
- University of North Texas College of Music, Denton
- University of Oregon School of Music and Dance, Eugene
- University of Texas at Austin, Butler School of Music
- University of North Carolina School of the Arts

== Former music institutions of higher learning ==
- American Conservatory of Music (1886–1991), Chicago
- American Institute of Applied Music (1900–1933), New York
- Combs College of Music (1885–1990), Philadelphia
- Detroit Institute of Musical Arts (1914–1970)
- Ellison-White Conservatory of Music (1918–1940s), Portland, Oregon
- Hartford Conservatory (1890–2011)

=== Former music institutions at historically black colleges and universities ===
- Western University, School of Music (1865–1943), Quindaro, Kansas City, Kansas

== See also ==
Category:Music schools in the United States by state or territory
