= Swimming at the 1983 Pan American Games – Men's 200 metre freestyle =

Men's 200 metre freestyle at the 1983 Pan American Games
- Venue: -
- Dates: 17 August 1983 (preliminaries and finals)
- Competitors: from - nations

Medalists
| Gold medal | Bruce Hayes | United States |
| Silver medal | Alberto Mestre | Venezuela |
| Bronze medal | Rowdy Gaines | United States |

The men's 200-metre freestyle competition of the swimming events at the 1983 Pan American Games took place on 17 August 1983. The last Pan American Games champion was Rowdy Gaines of the US.

This race consisted of four lengths of the pool, all performed in freestyle.

== Results ==
All times are in minutes and seconds.

| KEY: | q | Fastest non-qualifiers | Q | Qualified | GR | Games record | NR | National record | PB | Personal best | SB | Seasonal best |

=== Final ===
The final was held on August 17.

| Rank | Name | Nationality | Time | Notes |
|---|---|---|---|---|
| 1st place, gold medalist(s) | Bruce Hayes | United States | 1:49.89 | GR |
| 2nd place, silver medalist(s) | Alberto Mestre | Venezuela | 1:50.36 | SA |
| 3rd place, bronze medalist(s) | Rowdy Gaines | United States | 1:51.27 | |
| 4 | Peter Szmidt | Canada | 1:53.16 | |
| 5 | Jorge Fernandes | Brazil | 1:53.95 | |
| 6 | Jean François | Venezuela | 1:53.95 | |
| 7 | Carlos Scanavino | Uruguay | 1:54.01 | NR |
| 8 | Cyro Delgado | Brazil | 1:54.14 | |
