= Brubeck Institute =

The Brubeck Institute was a special program at the University of the Pacific's Conservatory of Music. It was founded in 2000 by noted Jazz pianist and Pacific alum Dave Brubeck. The Brubeck Institute consists of several different programs and initiatives that aim to support and promote jazz education and performance.
