= Lyman Woodard =

American jazz organist

- Born: Lyman Elnathan Woodard III; March 3, 1942
- Died: February 24, 2009 (aged 66) Owosso, Michigan, United States
- Genres: Jazz; Fusion; Soul; Funk
- Instruments: Hammond B-3, Piano
- Years active: 1975–2008
- Formerly of: The Lyman Woodard Organization

Lyman Woodard (March 3, 1942 – February 25, 2009) was a Detroit-based jazz organist known for fusing his music with Latin and Afro-Cuban-inspired rhythms. From the late 1960s, Woodard recorded with Motown acts, and served as musical director for Martha and the Vandellas. But releases – such as his 1975 Saturday Night Special – and his namesake outfit, the Lyman Woodard Organization, were in the jazz-funk idiom.

Before establishing the Lyman Woodard Organization, he composed a jazz trio with drummer Melvin Davis and guitarist Dennis Coffey; the ensemble performed numerous shows at a nightclub called Cobb's Corner. In 1968, Woodard and Melvin Davis recorded the album Hair And Thangs with Dennis Coffey. Although the album was released as a solo project by Dennis Coffey in 1969, a single containing "It's Your Thing" ("It's Your Thang" on the LP) and "River Rouge" was released with the artist(s) as "Dennis Coffey and the Lyman Woodard Trio". In 1979, Woodard returned to Cobb's Corner with the Organization to record Don't Stop the Groove, for the Corridor label. The 1985 recording, Dedicacion, featured violinist Regina Carter.

In March 2009, Wax Poetics Records reissued a limited pressing of Saturday Night Special as a double LP on 180-gram vinyl.

A memorial concert was held approximately one year after his death on what would have been Lyman Woodard's 68th birthday. Recorded live in concert in Detroit, Michigan and released as Lyman Woodard Organization Orchestra in 2011 by drummer and long-time bandmate, Dr. Prof. Leonard King, Jr., on his own label, Uuquipleu Records.

== Discography ==
=== As Leader ===
- Saturday Night Special (Strata Records, 1975)
- Don't Stop the Groove (Corridor, 1979)
- Dedicacion (Corridor, 1985)
- Live at the 1996 Ford Montreux Detroit Jazz Festival (Corridor, 1997)
- Live at J.J's lounge 1974 (Uuquipleu, 2008)
- 74/93 Live At Last!! (Uuquipleu, 2008)
- Lost & Found The 1971 Unreleased Recordings (Uuquipleu, 2014)
- Jazzy Weeknights Special (Uuquipleu, 2019)

=== As Sideman ===
With Dennis Coffey

- Dennis Coffey Trio – Hair And Thangs (Maverick, 1969)
- Dennis Coffey – Hot Coffey In The D (Resonance Records, 2016) (Recorded in 1968)
- Dennis Coffey – One Night At Morey’s: 1968 (Omnivore Recordings, 2018) (Recorded in 1968)

With Others

- George Bedard & The Kingpins – Hip Deep (Schoolkids' Records, 1996)
- SP – Movin' Along (P-Vine Records, 2008)
- Ron English – Fish Feet (P-Vine Records, 2009)

=== In Tribute ===
- Lyman Woodard Organization Orchestra (Uuquipleu, 2011) (Recorded on Mar 3, 2010)
