= Bud Spangler =

American Jazz musician and radio host 1938-2014

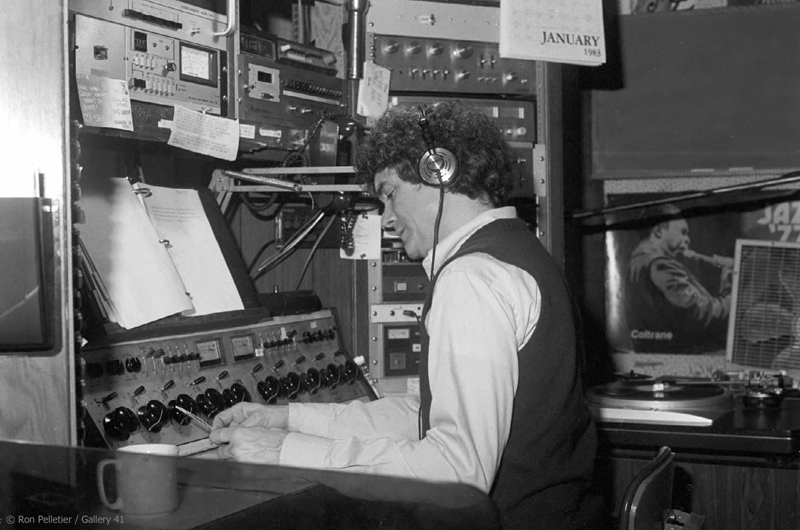
- Bud Spangler on the air for KJAZ in January 1983

Background information
- Born: 7 December 1938; Norwalk, Ohio
- Died: 16 January 2014 (aged 75)
- Genre: Jazz
- Instrument: Percussion

Robert "Bud" Spangler (7 December 1938 – 16 January 2014) was an American jazz percussionist, producer, radio broadcaster, and composer.

== Career ==
Born in Norwalk, Ohio in 1938, Bud began playing the drums in Wyandotte, Michigan, in the seventh grade, despite having had Polio. He moved from Ohio to Lansing in the late 1950s to attend Michigan State University. During his studies he worked as a radio DJ of the university channel WKAR-FM.

In the early 1970s he worked in the Detroit jazz scene as a musician and producer for the label Strata Records alongside Kenny Cox,including Kenn Cox’s Contemporary Jazz Quintet (CJQ), with which recordings for Blue Note Records were created. He also worked with Lyman Woodard, Jessica Williams (Nothin’ but the Truth, 1986) and the Detroit collective record label Tribe Records, along with Phil Ranelin and Marcus Belgrave.

In the 1990s, he lived in Northern California, where he led the Tom Peron-Bud Spangler Interplay Quartet with Tom Peron in the Bay Area and was active as a radio host of the San Mateo station KCSM (FM), where he hosted the Sunday Night Suites program for 25 years.

Spangler has produced Grammy-nominated recordings by jazz artists such as Taylor Eigsti, Mark Levine, Shirley Horn, Ed Reed and Cedar Walton. Between 1979 and 2011, he was involved in 28 jazz recording sessions.

On 16 January 2014, Bud died of lung cancer.
