= Kenny Cox =

- Born: November 8, 1940; Detroit, Michigan, United States
- Died: December 19, 2008 (aged 68) Detroit, Michigan, United States
- Genres: Jazz; Post bop Hard bop Bebop
- Occupation: Pianist
- Instrument: Piano

Kenny Cox (November 8, 1940 – December 19, 2008) was a jazz pianist performing in the post bop, hard bop and bebop mediums. Cox was pianist for singer Etta Jones during the 1960s and was also a member of a quintet led by trombonist George Bohannon. By the end of the late 1960s he had formed his own Kenny Cox and the Contemporary Jazz Quintet, which recorded two albums for Blue Note Records before the end of the decade. Cox has appeared as a contributor on various albums, and has also performed live with such musicians as Rahsaan Roland Kirk, Eddie Harris, Jackie McLean, Roy Haynes, Ben Webster, Wes Montgomery, Kenny Dorham, Philly Joe Jones, Kenny Burrell, Donald Byrd, Roy Brooks, Charles McPherson, and Curtis Fuller. During the 1980s he formed the Detroit-based Guerilla Jam Band, a group which performed with Regina Carter, James Carter, Tani Tabbal, Jaribu Shahid, Ralph Miles Jones, Marc Silver, and Craig Taborn. Cox was responsible for the short-lived Strata Records.

He died in his Detroit home of lung cancer at the age of 68.

== Discography ==
=== As leader ===
- Introducing Kenny Cox (Blue Note, 1968)
- Multidirection (Blue Note, 1969)
- Location (Strata, 1973)
- Clap Clap! The Joyful Noise (Strata, 1975)

=== As contributor ===
With James Carter

- Live at Baker's Keyboard Lounge (Warner Bros., 2001 [2004])

With Etta Jones

- Love Shout (Prestige, 1963)

With Others

- Catlett, Francisco Mora (1999). World Trade Music. Community Projects.
- Ranelin, Phil (2001). Vibes From the Tribe. Hefty Records.
