= Dominick Farinacci =

American jazz trumpeter (born 1983)

- Born: Dominick Farinacci; March 3, 1983; Cleveland, Ohio, United States
- Genres: Jazz
- Occupations: Bandleader, musician, composer
- Instrument: Trumpet
- Labels: E1 Music, Mack Avenue

Dominick Farinacci (born March 3, 1983) is an American jazz trumpeter, composer, and big band leader. He is currently signed to the Mack Avenue label. Farinacci was one of eighteen artists worldwide invited to be a part of the inaugural class of the Jazz Studies Program at The Juilliard School. Farinacci has won the "International New Star Award", Disney's "New Star Award", and topped the charts as one of Japan's No. 1 jazz musicians.

== Early life ==
Farinacci is from Cleveland, Ohio, and began playing trumpet in sixth grade at age eleven in Solon, Ohio. When asked why he picked the trumpet to play, he said, "I really wanted to play drums like my uncle, who was a professional drummer in Cleveland. So my aunt bought me a set of drums and my uncle assembled them for me, but I failed the drum auditions for the band! And the director said he really needed trumpet players, and asked if I would give that instrument a try." Shortly after he began playing trumpet, Farinacci started to listen to many trumpet players, including Louis Armstrong and Harry James. "I remember hearing a recording of Louis Armstrong playing 'A Kiss to Build a Dream On' and wanting to sound just like him. Harry James' 'You Made Me Love You' had a similar effect on me, so I learned their interpretations by ear, and tried to make my sound like their sound."

Farinacci joined a Saturday music program at Cuyahoga Community College (Tri-C) in Cleveland, which taught him more about playing in big bands, small groups, improvisation, and music theory. He put a band together with some of his friends and mentors in Cleveland and began dropping off demo recordings to local club owners. By eighth grade he had a few steady gigs around town with his own band, and listeners soon became aware of his abilities. "Playing gigs around town allowed me to start hanging out with many of the older musician - some of whom were my teachers in the Saturday program - and they started to see that I was really serious about playing.".

Soon, Farinacci was working five to six nights a week in the local jazz clubs with his own group, and as a sideman with some of the older musicians in town. He auditioned for the High School Grammy Awards All-Star Big Band in California, and was accepted. Here he met other young musicians from around the country who had similar musical passions, and had an opportunity to play at the Grammy Awards After-party. He was selected to participate in this band for three consecutive years. He also attended the Berklee College of Music Summer Jazz Program, and was offered a full-tuition scholarship to attend Berklee after he graduated from high school. At age 16 he received the Yamaha Young Performing Artist Award, which provided him an opportunity to play a solo piece at the University of Illinois for a crowd of more than 2,000 people. He was also selected to perform with the Monterey High School All-star Big Band on a summer tour throughout Japan in 1999.

== Career ==
At 17, Farinacci performed at the Tri-C Jazzfest in Cleveland, opening for Wynton Marsalis and his big band. A few months later Marsalis invited him to New York City to perform on a live PBS broadcast, Live From Lincoln Center: A Tribute to Louis Armstrong. Around this time, Farinacci received a scholarship to the Juilliard School for its first Jazz Program.

In September 2001, Farinacci moved to New York City. Within the first two months of school, Marsalis invited Farinacci to be featured in a concert at Lincoln Center; a tribute to two of his favorite trumpet players, Freddie Hubbard and Lee Morgan: Night of the Cookers. The producer of the event, Todd Barkan, contacted Farinacci in March 2002 to offer to record him as a leader for the Japanese label M&I Records. In April 2002 he recorded his debut album, Manhattan Dreams, which featured pianist Mulgrew Miller, bassist Chip Jackson, and drummer Joe Farnsworth. He went on to record a total of six records for M&I. By the time he graduated from Juilliard, he had received the two Gold Disc Awards, the International New Star Award, had won first place in the ITG Carmine Caruso International Jazz Trumpet Competition, and had traveled to Japan to promote his records.

In 2006 Farinacci was featured at the Kennedy Center in Washington, D.C., on Dee Dee Bridgewater's JazzSet for NPR, as well as at the Tanglewood Jazz Festival. He was a member of Miles to Miles, a band led by Jason Miles, and was featured on recordings Miles produced: What's Going On: A Tribute to Marvin Gaye, and 2 Grover With Love: A Tribute to Grover Washington Jr. He also performed and recorded with saxophonist Joe Lovano in 2007. In 2008 Farinacci debuted his own band at the Montreal International Jazz Festival, the Detroit International Jazz Festival, and the Tri-C JazzFest. He toured Korea and Japan with a Juilliard faculty and alumni quintet, and signed his first major U.S. recording contract with Koch Records (Entertainment One Music).

He has opened for British rock stars Jamie Cullum and Jeff Beck at the O2 in London, and has performed at Severance Hall with the Cleveland Orchestra.

Farinacci has co-created multimedia works about survivors of the September 11 attacks.

== Awards and honors ==
Farinacci received Gold Disc awards for two Japanese recordings from Swing Journal magazine: Say It and Besame Mucho. In 2003 he received the International New Star Award in Japan. Many of his Japanese releases placed No. 1 on the Swing Journal Jazz Charts. In the United States, Dominick was the recipient of the ITG Carmine Caruso International Jazz Trumpet Competition in 2003, and was awarded from Disney the New Star Award.

== Discography ==
=== As leader ===
- 2003: Manhattan Dreams (Pony Canyon/M&I)
- 2004: Besame Mucho (Pony Canyon/M&I)
- 2005: Smile (Pony Canyon/M&I)
- 2006: Adoro (Pony Canyon/M&I)
- 2006: Say It (Pony Canyon/M&I)
- 2009: Visions (JVC)
- 2009: Lovers, Tales & Dances (Koch/E1)
- 2011: Dawn of Goodbye (E1)
- 2016: Short Stories (Mack Avenue)

=== With Ernie Krivda ===
- 2002: The Music of Ernie Krivda (Cadence)
- 2003: Ernie Krivda Quintet Plays Ernie Krivda (CIMP)
- 2004: Ernie Krivda Quintet Plays Ernie Krivda, Volume 2 (CIMP)
- 2005: Stellar Sax (CIMP)

== Other sources ==
- Bruening, John C. "Dominick Farinacci Free Times Article". WKHR.org
- "Dominick Farinacci". Jim Wadsworth Productions
- "Solon Graduate and Jazz Trumpeter Dominick Farinacci to Perform in Tri-C Jazz Studies Benefit". Cleveland.com
