= Gary Vandermeulen =

Canadian swimmer

Personal information
- Full name: Gary Vandermeulen
- National team: Canada
- Born: June 19, 1965 (age 61) Dawson Creek, British Columbia
- Height: 1.85 m (6 ft 1 in)
- Weight: 79 kg (174 lb)

Sport
- Sport: Swimming
- Strokes: Freestyle
- College team: University of Calgary

Gary Vandermeulen (born June 19, 1965) is a former competition swimmer who represented Canada at the 1988 Summer Olympics in Seoul, South Korea. There he finished in 26th position in the 400-metre freestyle, and in eighth place with the Canadian men's 4x200-metre freestyle relay team.

Vandermeulen began his coaching career in 1995 with the Hanna Seals summer swim club in rural Alberta. He was a coach with the University of Calgary swim club from September 1995 to January 1998 and the head coach of the Duncan Stingrays swim team from 1998 to 2003. The most successful swimmer of his coaching career has been international swimmer Alison Sheppard. Her 50-metre freestyle time of 0:24.68 at the Commonwealth Games in Manchester in 2002 ranked her No. 1 in the world in that event.

Vandermeulen was the high performance swimming coach for the Tayside & Fife Institute of Sport (TFIS) based at the University of Dundee in Scotland from 2003 to 2006. During his tenure at TFIS, three swimmers from Tayside and Fife qualified for the European Junior Swimming championships. These swimmers were Ross Clark of Dundee, Andrew Rodgie of Dunfirmline, and Daniel Scott from Glenrothes. Vandermeulen was named as the performance manager of the swimming programme at the West of Scotland Institute of Sport from 2006 to 2007.

Vandermeulen and Sheppard, who became his wife, began the Sheppard Swim School in January 2008.

== See also ==
- List of Commonwealth Games medallists in swimming (men)
