= Flash mob computing =

Flash mob computing or flash mob computer is a temporary ad hoc computer cluster running specific software to coordinate the individual computers into one single supercomputer. A flash mob computer is distinct from other types of computer clusters in that it is set up and broken down on the same day or during a similar brief amount of time and involves many independent owners of computers coming together at a central physical location to work on a specific problem and/or social event.

Flash mob computer derives its name from the more general term flash mob which can mean any activity involving many people co-ordinated through virtual communities coming together for brief periods of time for a specific task or event. Flash mob computing is a more specific type of flash mob for the purpose of bringing people and their computers together to work on a single task or event.

== History ==
The first flash mob computer was created on April 3, 2004 at the University of San Francisco using software written at USF called FlashMob (not to be confused with the more general term flash mob).

The event, called FlashMob I, was a success. There was a call for computers on the computer news website Slashdot. An article in The New York Times "Hey, Gang, Let’s Make Our Own Supercomputer" brought a lot of attention to the effort. More than 700 computers were brought to the gym at the University of San Francisco, and were wired to a network donated by Foundry Networks.

At FlashMob I the participants were able to run a benchmark on 256 of the computers, and achieved a peak rate of 180 Gflops (billions of calculations per second), though this computation stopped three quarters of the way due to a node failure.

The best, complete run used 150 computers and resulted in 77 Gflops. FlashMob I was run off a bootable CD-ROM that ran a copy of Morphix Linux, which was only available for the x86 platform.

Despite these efforts, the project was unable to achieve its original goal of running a cluster momentarily fast enough to enter the (November 2003) Top 500 list of supercomputers. The system would have had to provide at least 402.5 Gflops to match a Chinese cluster of 256 Intel Xeon nodes. For comparison, the fastest super computer at the time, Earth Simulator, provided 35,860 Gflops.

== Creators of flash mob computing ==
Pat Miller was a research scientist at a national lab and adjunct professor at USF. His class on Do-It-Yourself Supercomputers evolved into FlashMob I from the original idea of every student bringing a commodity CPU or an Xbox to class to make an evanescent cluster at each meeting. Pat worked on all aspects of the FlashMob software.

Greg Benson, USF Associate Professor of Computer Science, invented the name "flash mob computing", and proposed the first idea of wireless flash mob computers. Greg worked on the core infrastructure of the FlashMob run time environment.

John Witchel (Stuyvesant High School '86) was a USF graduate student in computer science during 2004. After talking to Greg about the challenges of networking a stadium of wireless computers and listening to Pat lecture on what it takes to break the Top 500, John asked, "Couldn't we just invite people off the street and get enough power to break the Top 500?" FlashMob I and the FlashMob software was John's master's thesis.

== See also ==
- Flash mob
- Supercomputer
