= Strata Records =

Jazz record label

Strata Records was a short lived jazz record label. It released fewer than 10 albums that have become highly desirable since their release. Their cover designs were from John Sinclair.

The entire Strata catalog (including unissued albums) has been re-released on LP by 180 Proof Records.

== Discography ==
- SRI-101-74 – The Contemporary Jazz Quintet – Location
- SRI-102-74 – Bert Myrick - Live'n Well (1974)
- SRI-103-74 – Sphere – Inside Ourselves (1974)
- SRI-104-74 – Maulawi – Maulawi (1974)
- SRI-105-75 – Lyman Woodard Organization, The – Saturday Night Special (1975)
- SRI-106-75 – Kenny Cox – Clap Clap (The Joyful Noise)
- SRI-107-75 – Contemporary Jazz Quintet – The Black Hole
- SRI-108-75 – Ron English – Fish Feet
- SRI-109-75 – Larry Nozero Featuring Dennis Tini – Time
