= Tribe Records =

Record label

- Founded: 1970s
- Country of origin: United States

Tribe Records was an American jazz independent record label which was active during the 1970s and whose artists included Doug Hammond, Marcus Belgrave, Phil Ranelin and Wendell Harrison.

== History ==
Based in Detroit, Michigan, United States, Tribe Records was a collective of local musicians. The group included Wendell Harrison, Phil Ranelin, Marcus Belgrave, Harold McKinney, Roy Brooks, Charles Moore, and Doug Hammond amongst others. Besides the record label, Tribe held a publishing house for a magazine and a production company under its roof.

== Discography ==
=== Albums ===
- 1973: The Tribe Presents Wendell Harrison & Phillip Ranelin - Message From The Tribe
- 1973: Wendell Harrison - An Evening With The Devil
- 1974: Marcus Belgrave - Gemini II
- 1974: Harold McKinney - Voices And Rhythms Of The Creative Profile
- 1974: Phil Ranelin - The Time Is Now!
- 1975: Doug Hammond & David Durrah - Reflections In The Sea Of Nurnen
- 1975: Phil Ranelin - Vibes From The Tribe
- 1976: The Mixed Bag - Mixed Bag's First Album

=== Singles ===
- 1973 Wendell Harrison And The Tribe - "Farewell To Welfare Part 1 & 2"
- 1975 Doug Hammond & David Durrah - "Venus Fly Trap"

== See also ==
- List of record labels
