= Dan Hicks (singer) =

American singer-songwriter and musician (1941–2016)

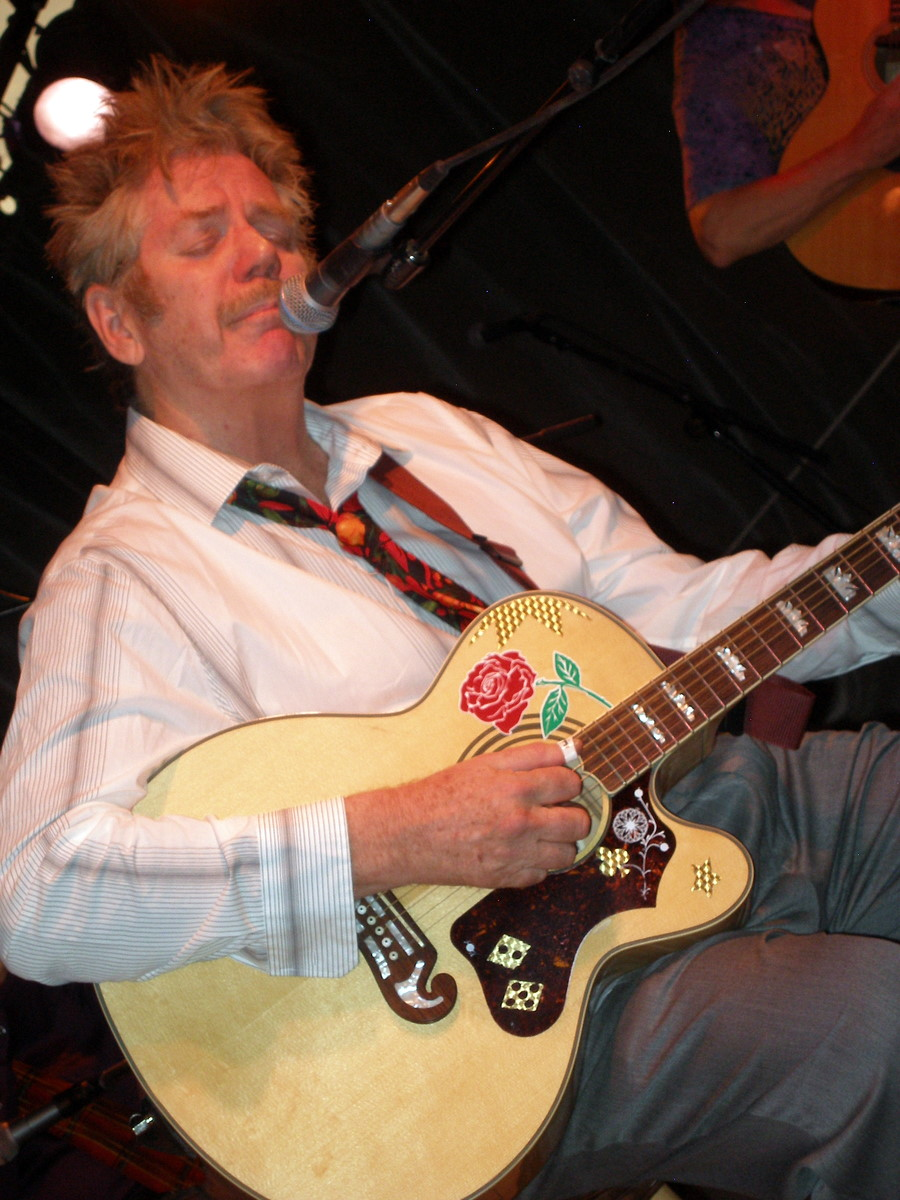
- Hicks at the Santa Fe Brewing Co., June 28, 2009

Background information
- Born: Daniel Ivan Hicks; December 9, 1941; Little Rock, Arkansas, U.S.
- Died: February 6, 2016 (aged 74) Mill Valley, California, U.S.
- Genres: Country; jazz; swing; bluegrass; folk; pop; gypsy; Western swing
- Occupations: Singer; songwriter; musician
- Instruments: Guitar; drums
- Years active: 1965–2016
- Website: www.danhicks.net

Daniel Ivan Hicks (December 9, 1941 – February 6, 2016) was an American singer-songwriter and musician, and the leader of Dan Hicks and His Hot Licks. His idiosyncratic style combined elements of cowboy folk, jazz, country, swing, bluegrass, pop, and gypsy music. He is perhaps best known for the songs "I Scare Myself" and "Canned Music". His songs are frequently infused with humor, as evidenced by the title of his tune "How Can I Miss You When You Won't Go Away?" His album Live at Davies (2013) capped over forty years of music.

Writing about Hicks for Oxford American in 2007, critic David Smay said, "[T]here was a time from the ’20s through the ’40s when swing—'hot rhythm'—rippled through every form of popular music. That’s the music Dan Hicks plays, and there’s no single word for it because it wasn’t limited to any one genre. Django Reinhardt and the Mills Brothers and Spade Cooley and Hank Garland and the Boswell Sisters and Stuff Smith and Bing Crosby all swing. You can make yourself nutty trying to define what Dan Hicks is. Then again, you could just say: Dan Hicks swings."

== Early life ==
Hicks was born in Little Rock, Arkansas on December 9, 1941. the only child of Ivan L. Hicks (a career United States Army and United States Air Force non-commissioned officer) and the former Evelyn Kehl. At age five, Hicks moved with his family to California. Following brief stints in Lomita, Cambria, and Vallejo, the family settled in Santa Rosa, the largest city in the North Bay subregion of the San Francisco Bay Area, where he was a drummer in grade school and played the snare drum in his school marching band.

At 14, he was performing with area dance bands. While in high school, he had a rotating spot on Time Out for Teens, a daily 15-minute local radio program. After receiving an A.A. in general education from Santa Rosa Junior College, he went on to earn a B.A. in broadcasting from San Francisco State College in 1965. Taking up the guitar in 1959, he became part of the American folk music revival scene during his undergraduate studies, often dropping out intermittently to perform at venues across the United States. Strongly influenced by the Jim Kweskin Jug Band, he would cultivate friendships with several of the group's members (most notably Maria Muldaur) later in life.

Although he maintained an equivocal stance toward rock music (lauding the early recordings of Elvis Presley and The Byrds while retrospectively maintaining that "rock has never really been my thing"), Hicks joined seminal San Francisco psychedelic rock band The Charlatans on drums in 1965.

In this capacity, he participated in the group's celebrated summer 1965 engagement at the Red Dog Saloon in Virginia City, Nevada. After the band failed to secure a long-term recording contract, he switched to rhythm guitar in 1967 and briefly performed his original material as the group's frontman before leaving in 1968.

== Bandleader ==
In 1967, Hicks formed Dan Hicks and His Hot Licks with violinist David LaFlamme as a vehicle for new songs rooted in his longstanding appreciation for acoustic-based forms of pre-rock popular music. In one of their earliest engagements, the group opened for The Charlatans; members of the latter band were surprised to see Hicks performing with a different ensemble.

In 1968, LaFlamme left to form It's a Beautiful Day and was replaced by jazz violinist and fellow Santa Rosan "Symphony" Sid Page. Following several lineup changes, vocalists Sherry Snow and Christine Gancher, guitarist Jon Weber, and bassist Jaime Leopold filled out the band, which had no drummer. This line-up was signed to Epic and in 1969 issued the album Original Recordings, produced by Bob Johnston. The first major Hot Licks lineup lasted until 1971 and then broke up.

"If Hicks's acoustic stylings react against the excesses of counterculture futurists, then the key moment on this live album [Where's the Money?] comes when he corrects 'his wife' with 'I should say old lady' and no one laughs. Hicks is delicate, tuneful, and droll, with an ear for colloquial history in words and music both, but he's so diffident about focus that his mock nostalgia is too easy to mistake for the right thing."

— Christgau's Record Guide: Rock Albums of the Seventies (1981)

When Hicks reformed the band, Page and Leopold remained, and vocalists Naomi Ruth Eisenberg and Maryann Price joined, followed later by guitarist John Girton and drummer Bob Scott. This group recorded three albums, culminating in 1973's Last Train to Hicksville. Following years of critical success, the album gained the group wider acclaim, peaking at No. 67 during an eighteen-week stay on the Billboard album chart; during this period, the group headlined at Carnegie Hall and appeared on The Tonight Show Starring Johnny Carson and The Flip Wilson Show. Nevertheless, Hicks dissolved the group by the end of the year, a decision that inspired a Charles Perry-penned Rolling Stone cover story. In 1997, he reflected on the decision: “It was getting old. We became less compatible as friends. I was pretty disillusioned, had some money, and didn’t want to do it any more.”

Over the next decade, Hicks seldom recorded while subsisting on Hot Licks royalties in his adopted hometown of Mill Valley, California. Envisaged as the soundtrack for an early iteration of Ralph Bakshi's Hey Good Lookin' (1982), the acclaimed It Happened One Bite was released as Hicks' first solo album by Warner Bros. Records in 1978; however, it only managed to peak at No. 155 in Billboard. Often performing under the influence of alcohol, opioids and cocaine, his reputation was sullied by a series of belligerent solo concerts. Following rehabilitation, he appeared with Asleep at the Wheel at Farm Aid II in 1986, auguring his return to the popular consciousness. Although he briefly resumed using alcohol and cannabis in the mid-1990s (a period that culminated in arrests for public intoxication and driving under the influence), Hicks would credit Alcoholics Anonymous with maintaining his sobriety.

The classic Hot Licks lineup reunited for an appearance on Austin City Limits in 1991. The program also featured Hicks' new group, The Acoustic Warriors, a combination of folk, swing, jazz and country which included Brian Godchaux on violin and mandolin, Paul "Pazzo" Mehling on guitar, and Richard Saunders on bass. In 1993, the Acoustic Warriors continued to perform locally around San Francisco and on the road, but this edition placed Paul Robinson on guitar, Nils Molin or Alex Baum on string bass, Stevie Blacke on mandolin and Josh Riskin on drums. Hicks recorded one CD with the Acoustic Warriors. Shootin' Straight was released by Private Music in 1996. Recorded live at McCabe's in Santa Monica, it featured Jim Boggio on accordion/piano, Stevie Blacke on mandolin/violin, Paul Robinson on guitar, Alex Baum on bass and former Hot Lick Bob Scott on drums.

Beginning with Beatin’ the Heat (featuring Elvis Costello, Tom Waits, Bette Midler, Rickie Lee Jones and Brian Setzer) in 2000, Hicks returned to releasing albums with a reconstituted lineup of the Hot Licks on Surfdog Records. Alive and Lickin’, a live album with the Hot Licks, followed in 2001. In 2003, Surfdog released Dan Hicks and The Hot Licks: Featuring an All-Star Cast of Friends, a live CD/DVD package. These albums reinvigorated Hicks, and the guests reflected their longtime admiration for the Hot Licks. Dan Hicks and The Hot Licks' comeback was met with widespread critical acclaim and led to several more albums under the Surfdog label. Selected Shorts featuring Jimmy Buffett, Willie Nelson and Gibby Haynes was released in 2004, then a downloadable compilation of Hicks's previously released duets in 2007, Tangled Tales in 2009, Crazy For Christmas in 2010, and Live at Davies in 2013. To honor Dan on the first anniversary of Dan Hicks passing, Surfdog Records released Greatest Licks – I Feel Like Singin’, a compilation album paying tribute and celebrating Dan's life and legacy, in February 2017.

In his later years, Hicks occasionally played jazz standards at intimate venues in the San Francisco Bay Area with Bayside Jazz.

In the film Class Action (1991), Hicks is seen performing with Eisenberg and Price at Rosatti's in San Francisco. He also can be seen in several documentary films, including Revolution (1968) and Rockin at the Red Dog (1996).

From its founding in 1977 until late in his life, Hicks played with the San Francisco Bay Area's Christmas Jug Band.

Thomas Dolby covered his song "I Scare Myself".

== Musical style ==
Billboard called Hicks an eccentric whose music contained elements of country, folk, jazz, and comedy. Hicks called his music "folk swing".

== Personal life ==
Hicks had a two decade on-off relationship with promoter Clare "CT" Wasserman. She was a protege of Bill Graham, and the former wife of bassist Rob Wasserman. They married in February 1997.

He was diagnosed with throat and liver cancer in 2014 or 2015 (sources vary). On February 6, 2016, he died from cancer at his home in Mill Valley at age 74.

His posthumous memoir, I Scare Myself, was published in 2017. He spent hours on the phone with journalist Kristine McKenna every Friday for several years before his death. She edited these conversations into Hicks' autobiography.

== Discography ==
=== Albums ===
- Dan Hicks & His Hot Licks (aka Original Recordings) (1969)
- Where's The Money? (1971)
- Striking It Rich (1972)
- Last Train to Hicksville...The Home Of Happy Feet (1973) (No. 91 Canada)
- It Happened One Bite (1978)
- Shootin' Straight (1994)
- The Amazing Charlatans (1996)
- Early Muses (1998)
- Beatin' The Heat (2000)
- Alive and Lickin' (2001)
- Dan Hicks & the Hot Licks – With an All-Star Cast of Friends (2003)
- Selected Shorts (2004)
- Canned Music (2006, DVD)
- Tangled Tales (2009)
- Crazy for Christmas (2010)
- Live at Davies (2013)

=== Compilations ===
- Moody Richard (1986)
- The Very Best of Dan Hicks and His Hot Licks (1986)
- Return to Hicksville (1997)
- The Most of Dan Hicks & His Hot Licks (2001)
- Live (2005, UK)
- Greatest Licks - I Feel Like Singin' (2017)
