= List of jazz guitarists =

The following is a list of notable jazz guitar players, including guitarists from related jazz genres such as Western swing, Latin jazz, and jazz fusion. For an article giving a short history, see jazz guitarists.

== A ==
- Eivind Aarset
- Rez Abbasi
- John Abercrombie
- William Ackerman
- Bernard Addison
- Ron Affif
- Noël Akchoté
- Jan Akkerman
- Howard Alden
- Johnny Alegre
- Oscar Alemán
- Laurindo Almeida
- Peter Almqvist
- Chuck Anderson
- Tuck Andress
- Ron Anthony
- Marc Antoine
- Bill DeArango
- Bruce Arnold
- Irving Ashby
- Dave Askren
- Badi Assad
- Gustavo Assis-Brasil
- Jay Azzolina

== B ==
- Elek Bacsik
- Derek Bailey
- Sheryl Bailey
- Duck Baker
- Biel Ballester
- Carlos Barbosa-Lima
- Dave Barbour
- Danny Barker
- Everett Barksdale
- Junior Barnard
- George Barnes
- Claude Barthélemy
- Billy Bauer
- Billy Bean
- Gerry Beaudoin
- Joe Beck
- David Becker
- Jean Marc Belkadi
- Kelvyn Bell
- Roni Ben-Hur
- George Benson
- Pierre Bensusan
- Randy Bernsen
- Peter Bernstein
- Gene Bertoncini
- Skeeter Best
- Ed Bickert
- Raoul Björkenheim
- Lee Blair
- Jack Bland
- Marek Bliziński
- Paul Bollenback
- Luiz Bonfá
- Perry Botkin Sr.
- Jean-Paul Bourelly
- Tim Bowman
- Joshua Breakstone
- Lenny Breau
- Zachary Breaux
- Jakob Bro
- Bobby Broom
- Norman Brown
- Sam Brown
- Jimmy Bruno
- Mike Bryan
- Dennis Budimir
- Hiram Bullock
- Teddy Bunn
- Kenny Burrell
- Billy Butler
- Jonathan Butler
- Charlie Byrd

== C ==
- Al Caiola
- Royce Campbell
- Jim Campilongo
- Steve Cardenas
- John Carlini
- Larry Carlton
- Al Casey
- Oscar Castro-Neves
- Chet Catallo
- Lauderic Caton
- Philip Catherine
- Franco Cerri
- Eugene Chadbourne
- Emmett Chapman
- Roger Chaput
- Ed Cherry
- Jean Chaumont
- Andrew Cheshire
- Pete Chilver
- James Chirillo
- Charlie Christian
- Joe Cinderella
- Bruce Clarke
- Dave Cliff
- Nels Cline
- Joe Cohn
- George Cole
- Cal Collins
- John Collins
- Eddie Condon
- Bill Connors
- Robert Conti
- Joyce Cooling
- Larry Coryell
- Pete Cosey
- Ray Crawford
- Henri Crolla
- Pierre Cullaz

== D ==
- Rudolf Dašek
- Bill DeArango
- Angelo Debarre
- Alex De Grassi
- Frank Deniz
- Bob DeVos
- Al Di Meola
- Joe Diorio
- Diz Disley
- Sacha Distel
- Pat Donohue
- Christy Doran
- Pierre Dørge
- Jim Douglas
- Scott DuBois
- Marc Ducret
- Ted Dunbar
- Cornell Dupree
- Eddie Duran
- Eddie Durham

== E ==
- Jon Eberson
- Lars Edegran
- Roddy Ellias
- Herb Ellis
- James Emery
- Tommy Emmanuel
- Okan Ersan
- Ron Escheté
- Christian Escoudé
- Gene Ess
- John Etheridge
- Kevin Eubanks

== F ==
- Dan Faehnle
- Dalia Faitelson
- Nelson Faria
- Tal Farlow
- Buzz Feiten
- Nir Felder
- Jim Ferguson
- Baro Ferret
- Boulou Ferré
- Matelo Ferret
- Scott Fields
- Carl Filipiak
- Barry Finnerty
- Jacob Fischer
- David Fiuczynski
- Chris Flory
- Antonio Forcione
- Robben Ford
- Bruce Forman
- Marc Fosset
- Mimi Fox
- George Freeman
- Russ Freeman
- Bill Frisell
- Fred Frith

== G ==
- Al Gafa
- Slim Gaillard
- Barry Galbraith
- Eric Gale
- Frank Gambale
- Oliver Gannon
- Dick Garcia
- Mondine Garcia
- Hank Garland
- Arv Garrison
- Danny Gatton
- Grant Geissman
- Eddie Gibbs
- João Gilberto
- David Gilmore
- Egberto Gismonti
- George Golla
- Jeff Golub
- Mick Goodrick
- Jocelyn Gould
- Jimmy Gourley
- Gismo Graf
- Jack Grassel
- Freddie Green
- Grant Green
- Ted Greene
- Sonny Greenwich
- Michael Gregory
- Tiny Grimes
- Marty Grosz
- George Guesnon
- Rune Gustafsson
- Fred Guy

== H ==
- Jerry Hahn
- Jim Hall
- René Hall
- Mary Halvorson
- Fareed Haque
- Bill Harris
- Jerome Harris
- Leroy Harris Sr.
- Joel Harrison
- Ken Hatfield
- Gilad Hekselman
- Scott Henderson
- Al Hendrickson
- Steve Herberman
- Jimmy Herring
- Carl Hogan
- Clarence Holiday
- Allan Holdsworth
- F Gregory Holland
- Toninho Horta
- Diane Hubka
- Brian Hughes
- Charlie Hunter

== I ==
- Ike Isaacs
- Enver İzmaylov

== J ==
- Ron Jackson
- Maceo Jefferson
- Billy Jenkins
- Bill Jennings
- Henry Johnson
- Lonnie Johnson
- Wayne Johnson
- Randy Johnston
- Boogaloo Joe Jones
- Rodney Jones
- Ronny Jordan
- Stanley Jordan
- Steve Jordan
- John Jorgenson
- Vic Juris

== K ==
- Henry Kaiser
- Ryo Kawasaki
- Louis Keppard
- Barney Kessel
- Calvin Keys
- Steve Khan
- Earl Klugh
- Ludwik Konopko
- Wayne Krantz
- Jonathan Kreisberg
- Carl Kress
- Volker Kriegel
- Uwe Kropinski
- Aleksey Kuznetsov
- Allen Kwela

== L ==
- Fapy Lafertin
- Julian Lage
- Biréli Lagrène
- Nappy Lamare
- Eddie Lang
- Jon Larsen
- Attila László
- Nguyên Lê
- Harry Leahey
- Phil Lee
- Adrian Legg
- Peter Leitch
- Adam Levy
- O'Donel Levy
- Vic Lewis
- Arto Lindsay
- Rudy Linka
- Jeff Linsky
- Ulysses Livingston
- Chuck Loeb
- Lorne Lofsky
- Lionel Loueke
- Mundell Lowe
- Romero Lubambo
- Sylvain Luc
- Nick Lucas
- Reggie Lucas
- Lawrence Lucie
- Lage Lund
- René Lussier
- Jo David Meyer Lysne

== M ==
- Alex Machacek
- Billy Mackel
- Ivor Mairants
- Russell Malone
- Jack Marshall
- Pat Martino
- Steve Masakowski
- Carmen Mastren
- Rick Matle
- Dick McDonough
- Eddie McFadden
- Dan McIntyre
- John McLaughlin
- Jimmy McLin
- Richard McPartland
- Coleman Mellett
- Pat Metheny
- Rale Micic
- Chieli Minucci
- Roman Miroshnichenko
- Ben Monder
- Wes Montgomery
- Oscar Moore
- Juarez Moreira
- Mike Moreno
- Joe Morris
- Tony Mottola
- Ronald Muldrow
- Jim Mullen
- Tisziji Muñoz
- Doug Munro
- Wolfgang Muthspiel

== N ==
- Randy Napoleon
- Ken Navarro
- Joe Negri
- Calvin Newborn
- Bern Nix
- Robert Normann
- Ray Norris

== O ==
- Andreas Öberg
- Ray Obiedo
- Jordan Officer
- Steve Oliver
- Mary Osborne
- Wim Overgaauw

== P ==
- Remo Palmier
- Jeff Parker
- John Parricelli
- Joe Pass
- Rosa Passos
- Ralph Patt
- Les Paul
- Oscar Peñas
- Jack Petersen
- Reynold Philipsek
- Chico Pinheiro
- John Pisano
- Bill Pitman
- Bucky Pizzarelli
- John Pizzarelli
- Chris Poland
- Jimmy Ponder
- Kenny Poole
- Baden Powell
- Doc Powell
- Jeanfrançois Prins
- Joe Puma

== Q ==
- Snoozer Quinn

== R ==
- Adam Rafferty
- Doug Raney
- Jimmy Raney
- Ernest Ranglin
- Hans Reichel
- Babik Reinhardt
- Django Reinhardt
- Joseph Reinhardt
- Lousson Reinhardt
- Nitcho Reinhardt
- Emily Remler
- Allan Reuss
- Alvino Rey
- Marc Ribot
- Tony Rice
- Lee Ritenour
- Howard Roberts
- Duke Robillard
- Phil Robson
- Steve Rochinski
- Adam Rogers
- Romane
- Jimmy Rosenberg
- Stochelo Rosenberg
- Kurt Rosenwinkel
- Issi Rozen
- Ray Russell
- Art Ryerson
- Terje Rypdal

== S ==
- Michael Sagmeister
- Luis Salinas
- Sal Salvador
- Dennis Sandole
- Gray Sargent
- Akio Sasajima
- Paulus Schäfer
- Dorado Schmitt
- Tchavolo Schmitt
- Diknu Schneeberger
- Reg Schwager
- Thornel Schwartz
- John Scofield
- Andrew Scott
- Bud Scott
- Bola Sete
- Brian Setzer
- Marvin Sewell
- Eldon Shamblin
- Elliott Sharp
- Sonny Sharrock
- Brad Shepik
- Jimmy Shirley
- Ronnie Singer
- Roy Smeck
- Jarek Śmietana
- Floyd Smith
- Johnny Smith
- Richard Smith
- Terry Smith
- Ferenc Snétberger
- Fabrizio Sotti
- Les Spann
- Melvin Sparks
- Russ Spiegel
- Louis Speiginer
- Peter Sprague
- Chris Standring
- John Stein
- Joscho Stephan
- Leni Stern
- Mike Stern
- Jimmy Stewart
- Louis Stewart
- John Stowell
- Dave Stryker
- Rory Stuart
- Monnette Sudler
- Andy Summers
- Nelson Symonds
- Gábor Szabó

== T ==
- Martin Taylor
- Tommy Tedesco
- Sister Rosetta Tharpe
- René Thomas
- Ole Thomsen
- Roberto Tola
- Jukka Tolonen
- David Torn
- Ralph Towner
- David Tronzo
- John Tropea

== U ==
- James Blood Ulmer
- Phil Upchurch

== V ==
- George Van Eps
- Jesse van Ruller
- Rick Vandivier
- Frank Vignola
- Al Viola
- Harry Volpe

== W ==
- Ulf Wakenius
- Mike Walker
- Leonard Ware
- Kazumi Watanabe
- Chuck Wayne
- Lloyd Wells
- Peter White
- Mark Whitfield
- Jack Wilkins
- Staffan William-Olsson
- Anthony Wilson
- Cory Wong
- Stephane Wrembel
- Denny Wright
- Jimmy Wyble

== Z ==
- Attila Zoller

== See also ==
- Jazz guitar
- Category:Jazz guitarists by genre
- Category:Jazz guitarists by nationality
