= Buddy Johnson =

American musician and bandleader (1915–1977)

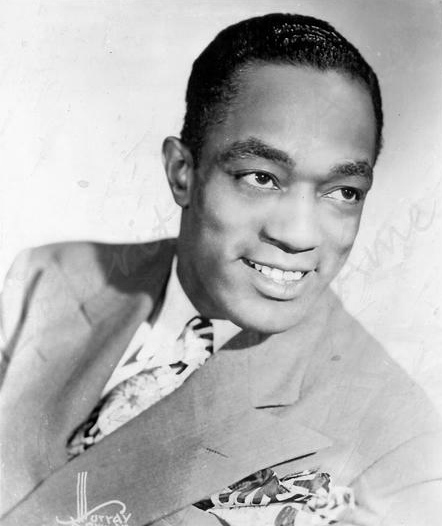
- Johnson, c. 1943

Background information
- Born: Woodrow Wilson Johnson; January 10, 1915; Darlington, South Carolina, U.S.
- Died: February 9, 1977 (aged 62) New York City, U.S.
- Genres: Jazz, jump blues, R&B urban blues
- Occupations: Musician, bandleader
- Instrument: Piano
- Years active: 1930s–1960s

Woodrow Wilson "Buddy" Johnson (January 10, 1915 – February 9, 1977) was an American jump blues pianist and bandleader active from the 1930s through the 1960s. His songs were often performed by his sister Ella Johnson, most notably "Since I Fell for You", which became a jazz standard, as did "Save Your Love For Me".

== Life and career ==
Born in Darlington, South Carolina, United States, Johnson took piano lessons as a child, and classical music remained one of his passions. In 1938, he moved to New York City, and the following year toured Europe with the Cotton Club Revue, being expelled from Nazi Germany. Later in 1939, he first recorded for Decca Records with his band, soon afterwards being joined by his sister Ella as vocalist.

By 1941, he had assembled a nine-piece orchestra, and soon began a series of R&B and pop chart hits. These included "Let's Beat Out Some Love" (No. 2 R&B, 1943, with Johnson on vocals), "Baby Don't You Cry" (No. 3 R&B, 1943, with Warren Evans on vocals), his biggest hit "When My Man Comes Home" (No. 1 R&B, No. 18 pop, 1944, with Ella Johnson on vocals), and "They All Say I'm The Biggest Fool" (No. 5 R&B, 1946, with Arthur Prysock on vocals). Ella Johnson recorded her version of "Since I Fell for You" in 1945, but it did not become a major hit until recorded by Lenny Welch in the early 1960s.

In 1946, Johnson composed a Blues Concerto, which he performed at Carnegie Hall in 1948. His orchestra remained a major touring attraction through the late 1940s and early 1950s, and continued to record in the jump blues style with some success on record on the Mercury label like "Hittin' on Me" and "I'm Just Your Fool". His song "Bring It Home to Me" appears on the 1996 Rocket Sixty-Nine release Jump Shot.

"Personally, I like classics," Buddy Johnson told Down Beat, "but our bread and butter is in the south. The music I play has a southern tinge to it. They understand it down there."

In 1977, Johnson died at the age of 62 from a brain tumor and sickle cell anemia in New York.

== Awards ==
- Induction, South Carolina Music Hall of Fame, 2001

== Discography ==
=== Albums ===
- Rock and Roll with Buddy Johnson (Wing, 1956; Mercury, 1957)
- Walkin' (Mercury, 1957)
- Buddy Johnson Wails (Mercury, 1958; Wing, 1963)
- Swing Me (Mercury, 1958; Verve, 1989)
- Go Ahead & Rock Rock Rock (Roulette, 1959; Collectables, 1991)
- Rock 'n' Roll Stage Show (Wing) reissue of Rock and Roll with Buddy Johnson

=== Singles ===
Decca Records

- 7684: "Stop Pretending (So Hip You See)" // "Jammin' in Georgia" (1939)
- 7700: "When You're Out with Me" // "Reese's Idea" (1939)
- 8507: "Please, Mister Johnson" // "Swing Along with Me" (1940)
- 8518: "You Won't Let Me Go" // "Southern Echoes" (1940)
- 8546: "Boogie Woogie's Ma-in-Law" // "(I'd Be) Ever So Grateful" (1941)
- 8555: "New Please, Mr. Johnson" // "In There" (1941)
- 8562: "Southern Exposure" // "Troyon Swing" (1941)
- 8573: "It's the Gold" // "I'm My Baby's Baby" (1941)
- 8599: "I'm Stepping Out" // "Toodle-Oodle-Oo" (1941)
- 8611: "I Wonder Who's Boogiein' My Woogie Now" // "You'll Get Them Blues" (1942)
- 8616: "Deep Down in the Miz" // "Without the One You Love" (1942)
- 8632: "Stand Back and Smile (Say Ella)" // "Baby, Don't You Cry" (1942)
- 8640: "I Ain't Mad with You" // "My Lonely Cabin" (1942)
- 8647: "I Done Found Out" // "Let's Beat Out Some Love" (1942)
- 8655: "When My Man Comes Home" // "I'll Always Be with You" (1942)
- 8671: "That's the Stuff You Gotta Watch" // "One of Them Good Ones" (1944)
- 11000: "Fine Brown Frame" // "They All Say I'm the Biggest Fool" (1944)
- 48012: "I Still Love You" // "Walk 'Em" (1945)
- 48016: "They All Say I'm the Biggest Fool" // "Since I Fell for You" (1945)
- 48019: "Fine Brown Frame" // "That's the Stuff You Gotta Watch" (1946), reissues
- 48028: "Hey, Sweet Potato" // "One Thing I Never Could Do" (1947)
- 48040: "You'll Get Them Blues" // "(I Wonder) Where Our Love Has Gone" (1947)
- 48052: "Please, Mister Johnson" // "Stop Pretending (So Hip You See)" (1947), reissues
- 48060: "Serves Me Right" // "You Can't Tell Who's Lovin' Who" (1947)
- 48076: "Far Cry" // "Li'l Dog" (1947)
- 48088: "I Don't Care Who Knows" // "You Had Better Change Your Ways" (1948)
- 24543: "I Don't Care Who Knows" // "You Had Better Change Your Ways" (1948), re-release
- 24596: "(No, There'll Never Be) Someone So Sweet As You" // "Pullamo" (1948)
- 24641: "If You Never Return" // "If I Ever Find You, Baby" (1949)
- 24641: "Somebody's Knocking at My Door" // "If I Ever Find You, Baby" (1949), re-release
- 24675: "Did You See Jackie Robinson Hit That Ball" // "Down Yonder" (1949)
- 24716: "As I Love You" // "Lovely in Her Evening Gown" (1949)
- 24817: "It Was Swell Knowing You" // "I'm Tired of Crying Over You" (1949)
- 24842: "Because (Pt. 1)" // "Because (Pt. 2)" (1949)
- 24920: "When Day Is Done" // "That's What My Baby Says" (1950)
- 24996: "You Got to Walk the Chalk Line" // "Keep Me Close to You" (1950)
- 25684: "When Day Is Done" // "What Will I Tell My Heart" (1950), re-release
- 27087: "Tell Me What They're Saying (Can't Be True)" // "Shake 'Em Up" (1950)
- 27330: "Satisfy My Soul" // "I Cry" (1950)
- 27416: "Jet (My Love)" // "No More Love" (1951)
- 27486: "What Will I Tell My Heart" // "Dr. Jive Jives" (1951)
- 27567: "My Reverie" // "Am I Blue" (1951)
- 27627: "We'd Only Start It All Over Again" // "I Need You" (1951)
- 27711: "I'm in Your Power" // "Stormy Weather" (1951)
- 27814: "Ever Since the One I Love's Been Gone" // "Be Careful (If You Can't Be Good)" (1951)
- 27947: "I'm Gonna Jump in the River" // "Till My Baby Comes Back" (1952)
- 27998: "Root Man Blues" // "At Last" (1952)
- 28165: "I Don't Know What's Troublin' Your Mind" // "My Aching Heart" (1952)
- 28293: "Baby You're Always on My Mind" // "Shufflin' and Rollin'" (1952)
- 28378: "This New Situation" // "Be Reasonable" (1952)
- 28530: "Just to Be Yours" // "Somehow, Somewhere" (1953)
- 28907: "Talkin' About Another Man's Wife" // "Jeanette" (1953)
- 29058: "Two Cigarettes in the Dark" // "A Handful of Stars" (1953)

Mercury Records

- 70116: "Hittin' n Me" // Ecstasy" (1953)
- 70173: "That's How I Feel About You" // "Jit Jit" (1953)
- 70251: "I'm Just Your Fool" // "A-12" (1953)
- 70321: "One More Time" // "Mush Mouth" (1954)
- 70377: "Ain't Cha Got Me (Where You Want Me)" // "Let's Start All Over Again" (1954)
- 70421: "Any Day Now" // "A Pretty Girl (A Cadillac and Some Money)" (1954)
- 70488: "There's No One Like You" // "I Never Had It So Good" (1954)
- 70523: "Crazy 'Bout a Saxophone" // "(Gotta Go) Upside Your Head" (1955)
- 70656: "Bitter Sweet" // "Send Out for a Bottle of Beer" (1955)
- 70695: "It's Obdacious" // "Save Your Love for Me" (1955)
- 70775: "Doot Doot Dow" // "I Don't Want Nobody (To Have My Love but You)" (1955)
- 70912: "You Got It Made" // "Bring It Home to Me" (1956)
- 71017: "Why Don't Cha Stop It" // "Kool Kitty" (1956)
- 71068: "Oh! Baby Don't You Know" // "Rock On" (1957)
- 71159: "I've Surrendered" // "Slide's Mambo" (1957)
- 71262: "I Wonder Where Our Love Has Gone" // "Minglin'" (1958)
- 71723: "I Don't Want Nobody (To Have My Love But You)" // "I'm Just Your Fool" (1960), reissues
- 71799: "(Ha! Ha! Baby) The Last Laugh's on You" // "Good-Time Man" (1961)

Wing

- 90064: "Doot Doot Dow" // "I Don't Want Nobody (To Have My Love But You)" (1956), re-release
- 90074: "Buddy's Boogie" // "I'll Dearly Love You" (1956)
- 90084: "Goodbye Baby" // "I Still Love You" (1956)

Roulette Records

- 4134: "Don't Fail Me Baby" // "Tuke No. 1" (1959)
- 4188: "Keeping My Love for You" // "A Woman, a Lover, a Friend" (1959)

== See also ==
- List of jump blues musicians
- List of New York blues musicians
- List of bebop musicians
- List of Mercury Records artists
