= Bruce Arnold =

Bruce Arnold may refer to:

- Bruce Arnold (archer), American-born archer
- Bruce Arnold (author) (1936–2024), English-born journalist and writer based in Ireland
- Bruce Arnold (jazz) (born 1955), American jazz guitarist and composer

== See also ==
- Bruce Arnold Ackerman (born 1943), American constitutional law scholar
