= Olivier Ker Ourio =

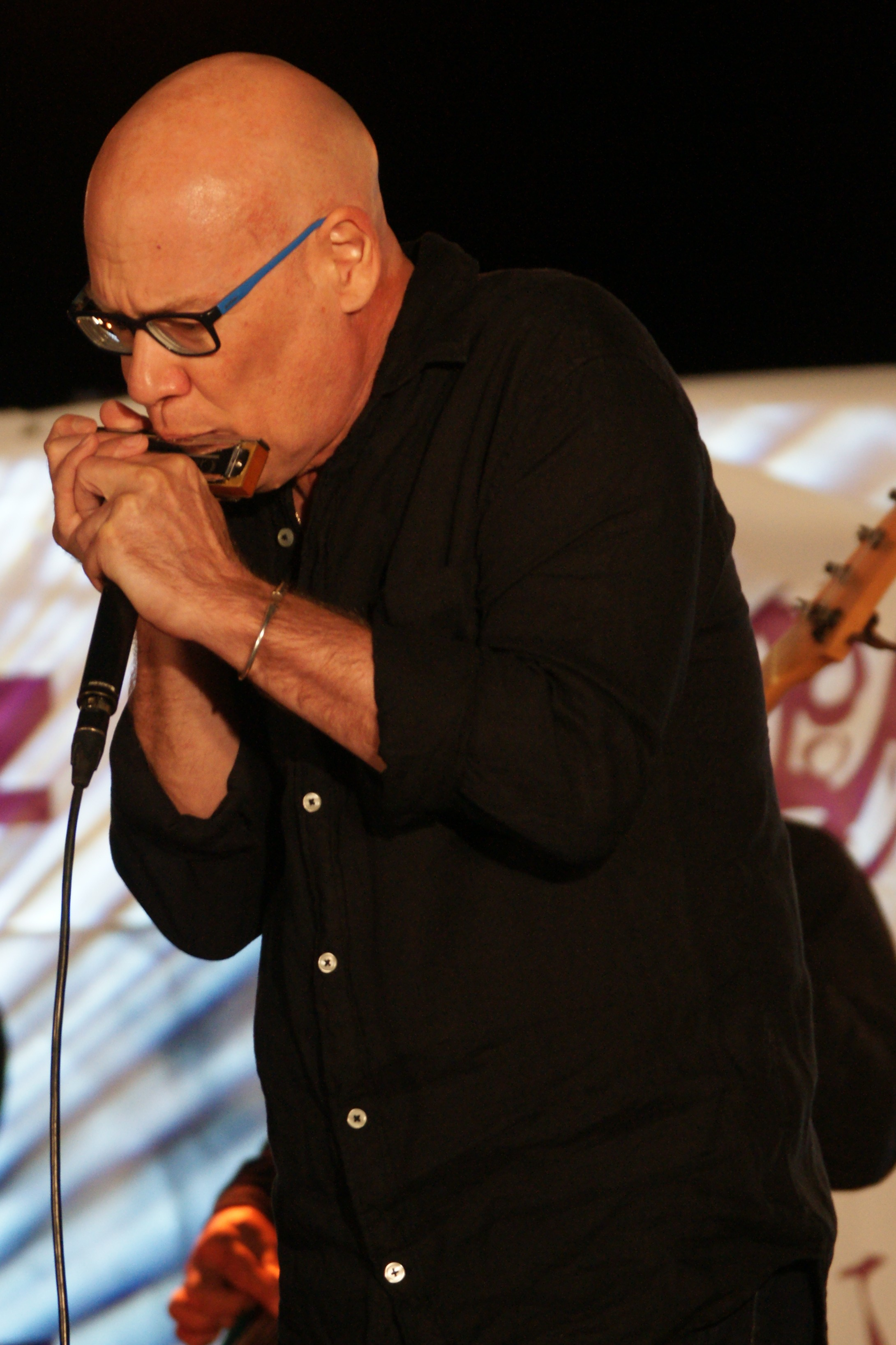
Olivier Ker Ourio, Coartjazz 2018, Coaraze

Olivier Ker Ourio (born 1964 in Paris, from a family originally from Réunion) is a jazz musician of Breton ancestry known for playing Chromatic harmonica. He has worked with Bruce Arnold, Franck Amsallem, David Kikoski, and Annie Ebrel among others. He has also shown an interest in Reunion Creole music and Celtic music.
