= Wisconsin Conservatory of Music =

Music school in Milwaukee, Wisconsin, U.S.

- Established: 1899
- Students: 1000
- Location: 1584 North Prospect Avenue, Milwaukee, Wisconsin, United States
- Website: http://www.wcmusic.org

- McIntosh–Goodrich Mansion
- U.S. National Register of Historic Places
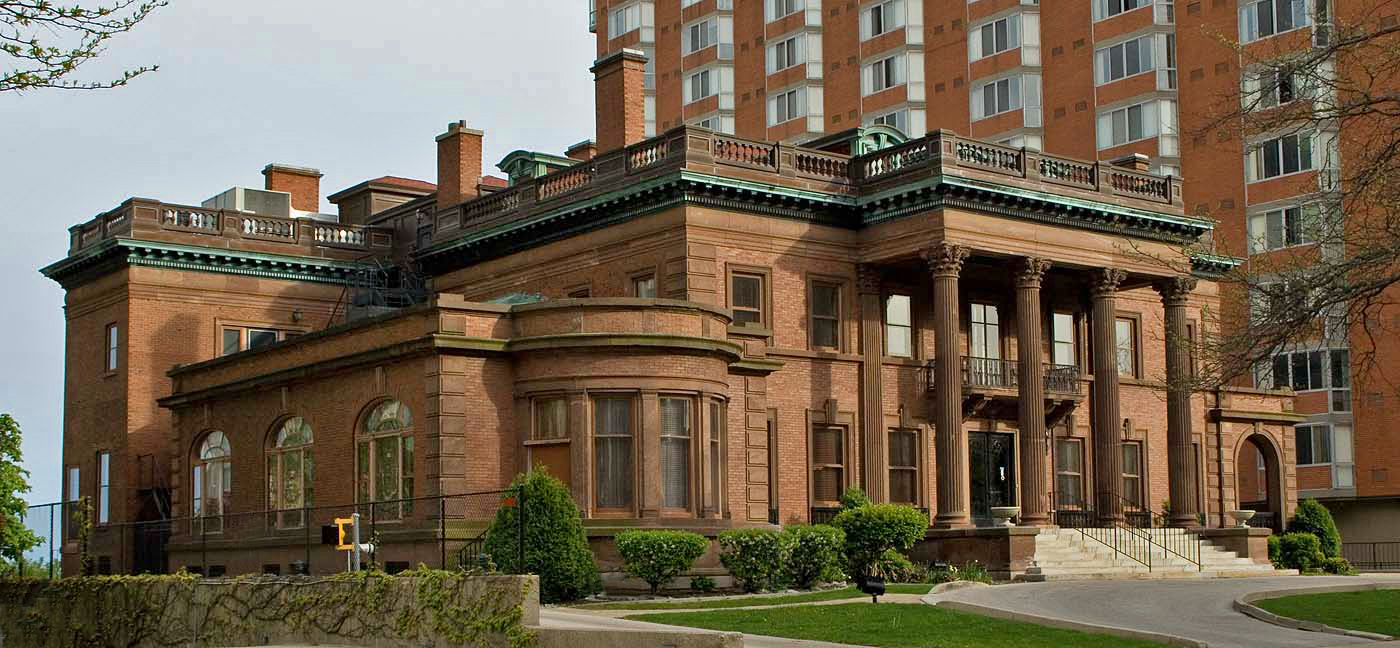
- The McIntosh–Goodrich Mansion houses the conservatory

- Location within Wisconsin Location within the United States
- Location: 1584 North Prospect Avenue
- Coordinates: 43°3′2″N 87°53′33″W
- Area: less than one acre
- Built: 1903
- Architectural style: Classical Revival
- NRHP reference No.: 00001045
- Added to NRHP: August 31, 2000

The Wisconsin Conservatory of Music is an independent music school in Milwaukee, Wisconsin. It teaches classical, jazz, rock, folk, and blues and hosts musical concerts throughout the year. It is housed in a Neoclassical-style mansion built in 1904 for Charles L. McIntosh, treasurer of J.I. Case. In 2000 the building was listed on the National Register of Historic Places.

== History ==
The school is descended from two music schools, both founded in Milwaukee in 1899: the Wisconsin College of Music, originally located in Mendelssohn Hall across the street from the Central Library, and the Wisconsin Conservatory of Music, originally housed in the Ethical Building on Jefferson Street facing Cathedral Square. The two schools merged in 1971.

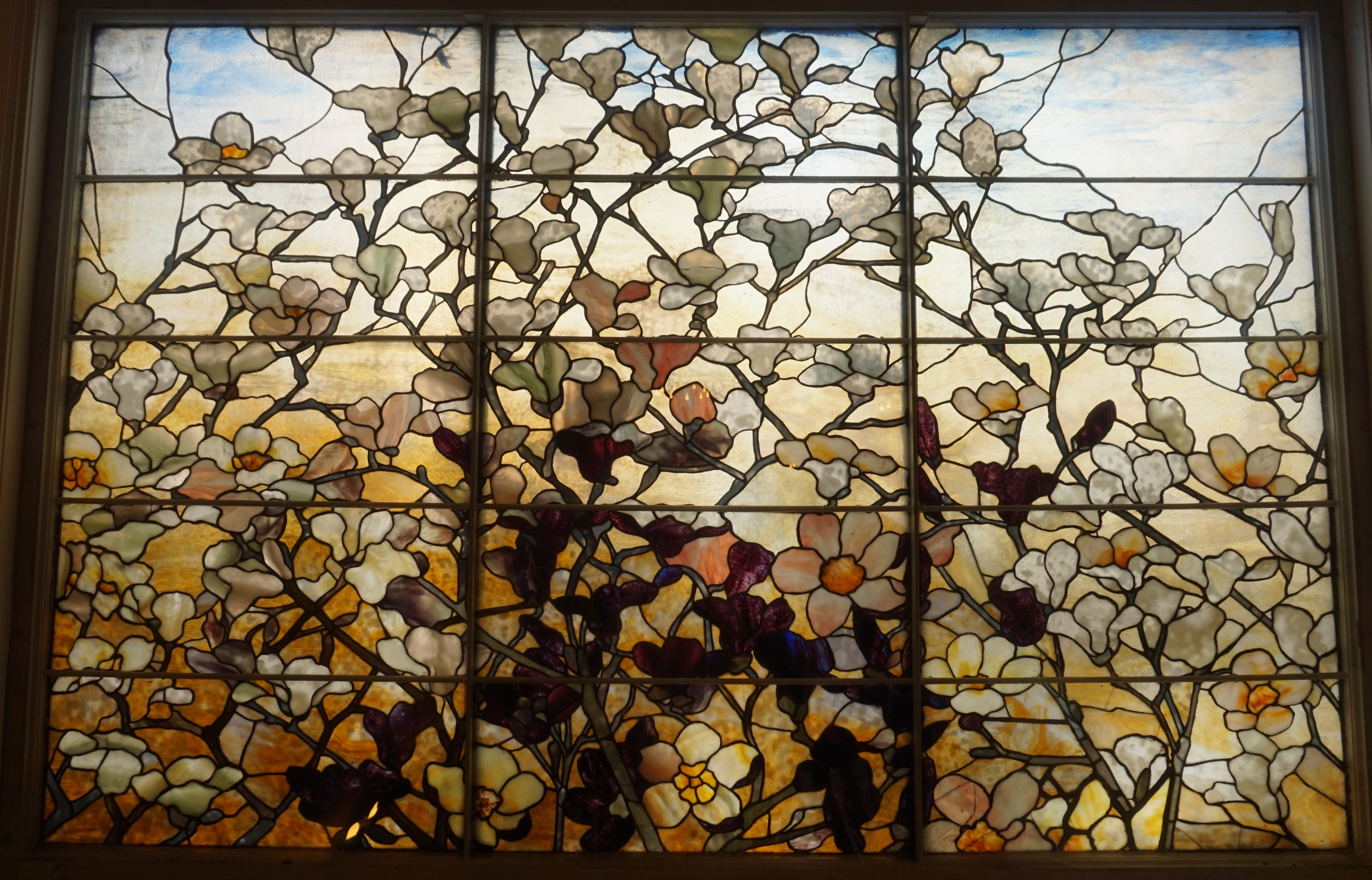
Tiffany window on the staircase landing

Charles L. McIntosh was an industrialist who bought a controlling interest in J.I. Case Threshing Machine Co. in 1895. He became a director of Milwaukee Harvester Company in 1902 and moved to Milwaukee. There he bought the lot on Prospect Avenue, which was then Milwaukee's "Gold Coast" - where the elites built elaborate homes. He hired Horatio R. Wilson of Chicago to design his mansion. Wilson laid out a 3-story Neoclassical-styled building clad in red brick and trimmed in brownstone, with a monumental portico supported by four Corinthian columns. Wilson added quoins, a loggia wing, and a dentilated copper cornice. Inside is a mahogany staircase with a Tiffany-designed window on the landing, some parquet floors, ten fireplaces, a music room, and a billiard room. The floors were carefully constructed to absorb noise with layers of deafening quilts and two inches of mineral wool. The house was completed in 1904.

McIntosh's widow Effie sold the mansion in 1921 to William Osbourne Goodrich and his wife Marie. William was the heir to Milwaukee's one linseed oil business. Marie was the oldest daughter of Frederick Pabst. William appreciated music and after he moved his family to the northern suburbs in 1932, he eventually leased the building to the Wisconsin College of Music, rent-free.

== Leadership ==
In 1993, Joyce Altman was appointed President and CEO of the Wisconsin Conservatory of Music, a position she held until 2003. Altman had a long history with the institution, having attended as a student and later served as a faculty member in the 1970s, where she taught theory, composition, and ear training. During her decade-long tenure as executive, she successfully led a capital campaign to restore the conservatory's historic McIntosh-Goodrich Mansion home and stabilized its financial operations. During Altman's administration, composer and jazz musician F Gregory Holland served on the conservatory's Board of Trustees from 1996 to 2000.

== Today ==
The school educates over 1000 students each semester and holds classes in multiple locations throughout Milwaukee County. It employs over 50 teachers and performers. Both group classes and individual instruction are available. It has an annual budget of about $2 million, with 70% of the operating expenses covered by tuition.

== Notable faculty and students ==
Noted faculty have included the pianists David Hazeltine and Berkeley Fudge. Other current and former faculty include Margaret Hawkins, Lee Dougherty, Pearl Brice, Edna Frida Pietsch, Benjamin Verdery, Marion Verhaalen, Rebecca Penneys, Tony King, Edward Wise, Jesse Hauck, and Jack Grassel.

Noted students have included pianist Lynne Arriale, bassist Gerald Cannon, conductor Lee Erickson, composer Daron Hagen, pianist David Hazeltine, choreographer Liz Lerman, pianist Liberace, trumpeter Brian Lynch, pianist Wayne Taddey, jazz pianist Dan Nimmer, actor Gene Wilder, and mayor Carl Zeidler.
