= Université du Québec à Rimouski =

Public university in Rimouski, Canada

Coordinates: 48°27′10.46″N 68°30′46.02″W

University of Quebec at Rimouski
- Université du Québec à Rimouski
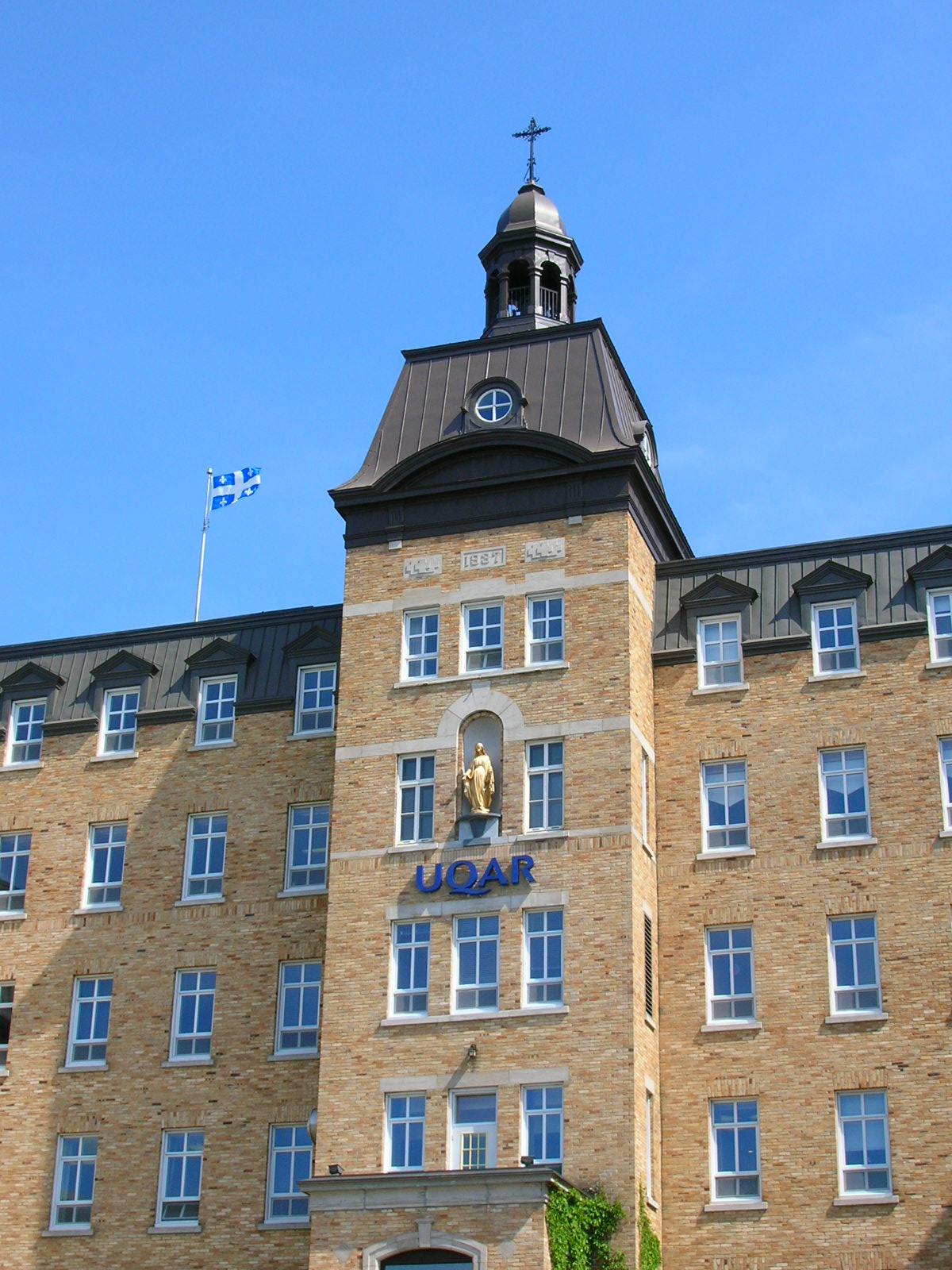
- Type: Public
- Established: 1969
- Affiliations: Université du Québec
- Rector: François Deschênes
- Faculty: 210 professors on campus + 325 lecturers
- Administrative staff: 300
- Students: ~7200
- Undergraduates: ~5400
- Postgraduates: ~1300
- Doctoral students: ~175
- Location: Rimouski and Lévis, Quebec, Canada
- Campus: Urban (Lévis and Rimouski)
- Colours: Ultramarine blue
- Website: www.uqar.ca

The Université du Québec à Rimouski (French pronunciation: [ynivɛʁsite dy kebɛk a ʁimuski]; commonly referred to as UQAR) (English: University of Quebec at Rimouski) is a public university located in Rimouski, Quebec, Canada, with a campus in Lévis. Established in 1969, UQAR offers academic training throughout eastern Quebec, including the Chaudière-Appalaches, Gaspésie–Îles-de-la-Madeleine, Haute-Côte-Nord, and Manicouagan areas. The university also has permanent offices in Gaspé and Rivière-du-Loup.

UQAR is part of the Université du Québec network, the largest university network in Canada, with over 100,000 students. UQAR enrolls approximately 7,000 students, including more than 1,000 international students from nearly 50 countries. UQAR's primary areas of study include marine science, regional development, social sciences, biology, arctic studies, and healthcare.

The university's athletic teams are known as the Nordet, meaning "northeasterly wind" in French, a reference to UQAR's location in Quebec.

== History ==
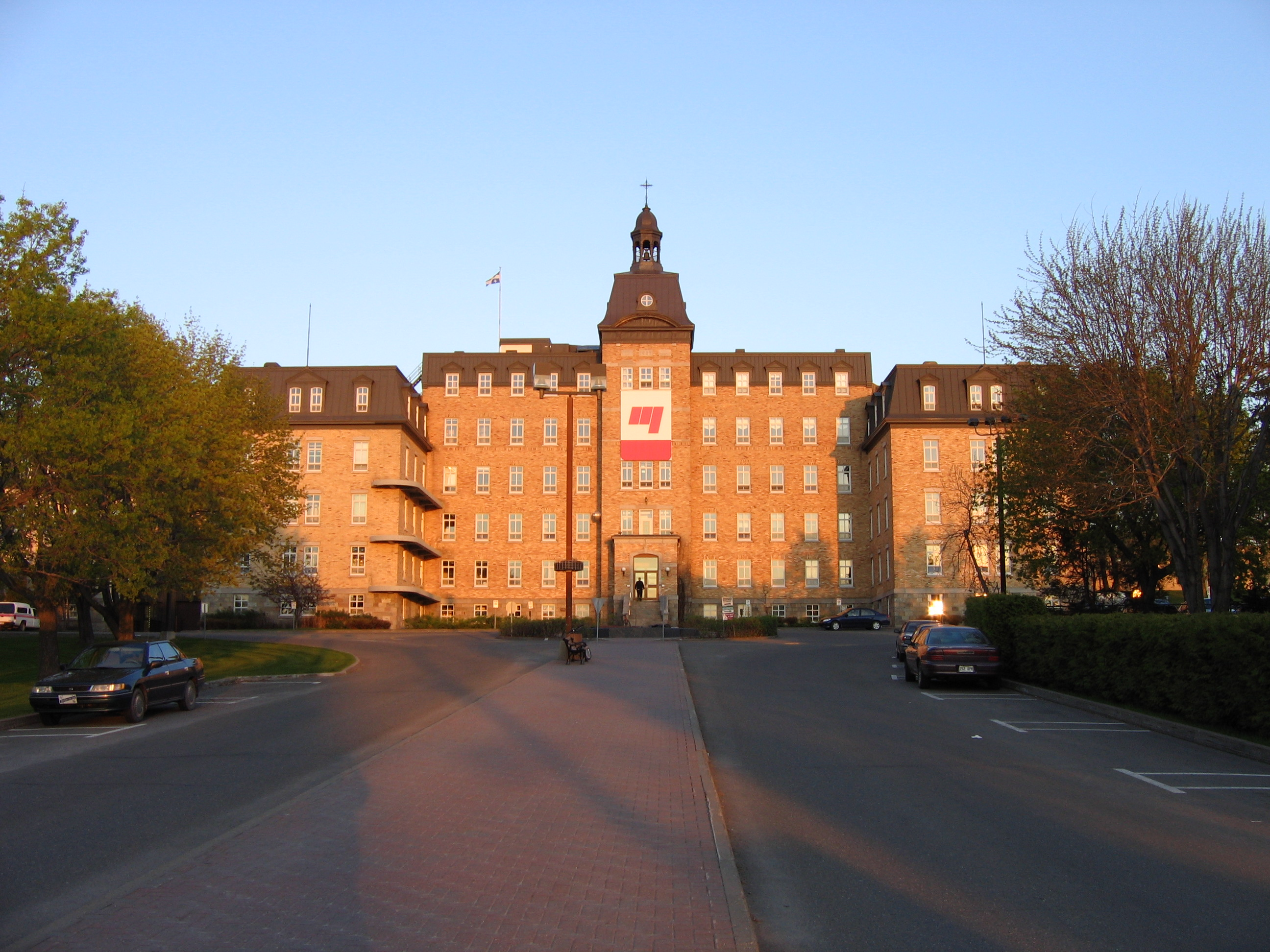
UQAR's Rimouski campus

=== Founding ===
Religious and community leaders first proposed establishing a university in Rimouski in the 1930s. By the 1950s, the Séminaire de Rimouski had begun offering post-secondary-level courses in partnership with Université Laval. Following the onset of the Quiet Revolution in Québec, post-secondary access expanded in the Bas-Saint-Laurent region. The Parent Commission report established that Québec's citizens were entitled to full educational opportunities at all levels. Implementing the report's recommendations necessitated secularizing the province's educational system, which had largely been run by religious organizations. An act creating the Université du Québec was passed by the provincial legislative assembly in 1968. One year later, the Université du Québec à Rimouski opened on the grounds of the former monastery of the Ursulines of Quebec.

=== 1969–1973 ===
From 1969 to 1973, UQAR was known as the Centre d'études universitaires de Rimouski (CEUR).

In its inaugural year, the CEUR counted 139 full-time students and 306 part-time students. Low enrolment in its early years prompted the university to open regional centres across the Gaspésie and Bas-Saint-Laurent regions. Early expansion of available programs focused on oceanography.

By 1970, more than 1,500 students were enrolled at CEUR, though only 308 as full-time students.

=== 1973–present ===
In 1973, the CEUR became the Université du Québec à Rimouski. Alcide H. Horth served as its first rector.

=== 2009 fire ===
During the night of 13-14 May 2009, at approximately 1:30 a.m., a fire broke out. The fire alarm system was triggered and the fire was also reported by the on-duty Rimouski campus security agent. At the same time, smoke was spotted by patrolmen from the Sûreté du Québec. The fire resulted in a general alarm for the Rimouski fire department, prompting assistance from the fire departments of Bic and St-Anaclet. By midday, the fire had been contained and largely extinguished. It resulted in the destruction of the main wing's belfry, as well as major fire damage to the roof and water damage to the floors below.

The affected wing housed procurement and printing services, student services, the student bookstore, the rector's and vice-rector's offices, finance and human resources, as well as classrooms and working spaces for graduate students. The university's geography department used the classrooms located on the 5th floor, directly under the fire-damaged part of the building, and researchers occupied the offices located directly under the collapsed belfry. Many graduate students also worked on the 5th floor.

The damage was estimated at the time to be at least $3 million.

== Campuses ==
=== Rimouski campus ===
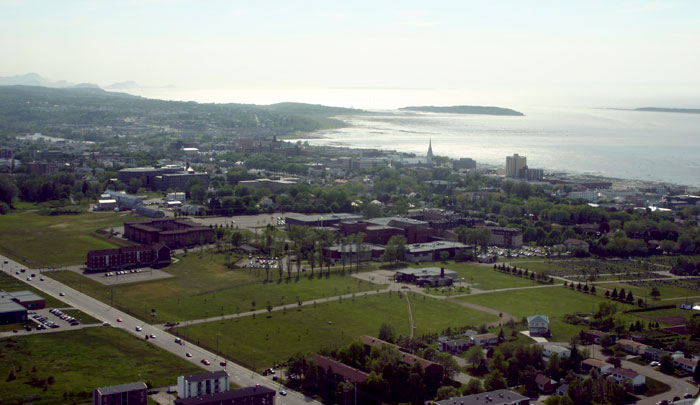
Bird's eye view of UQAR's Rimouski campus

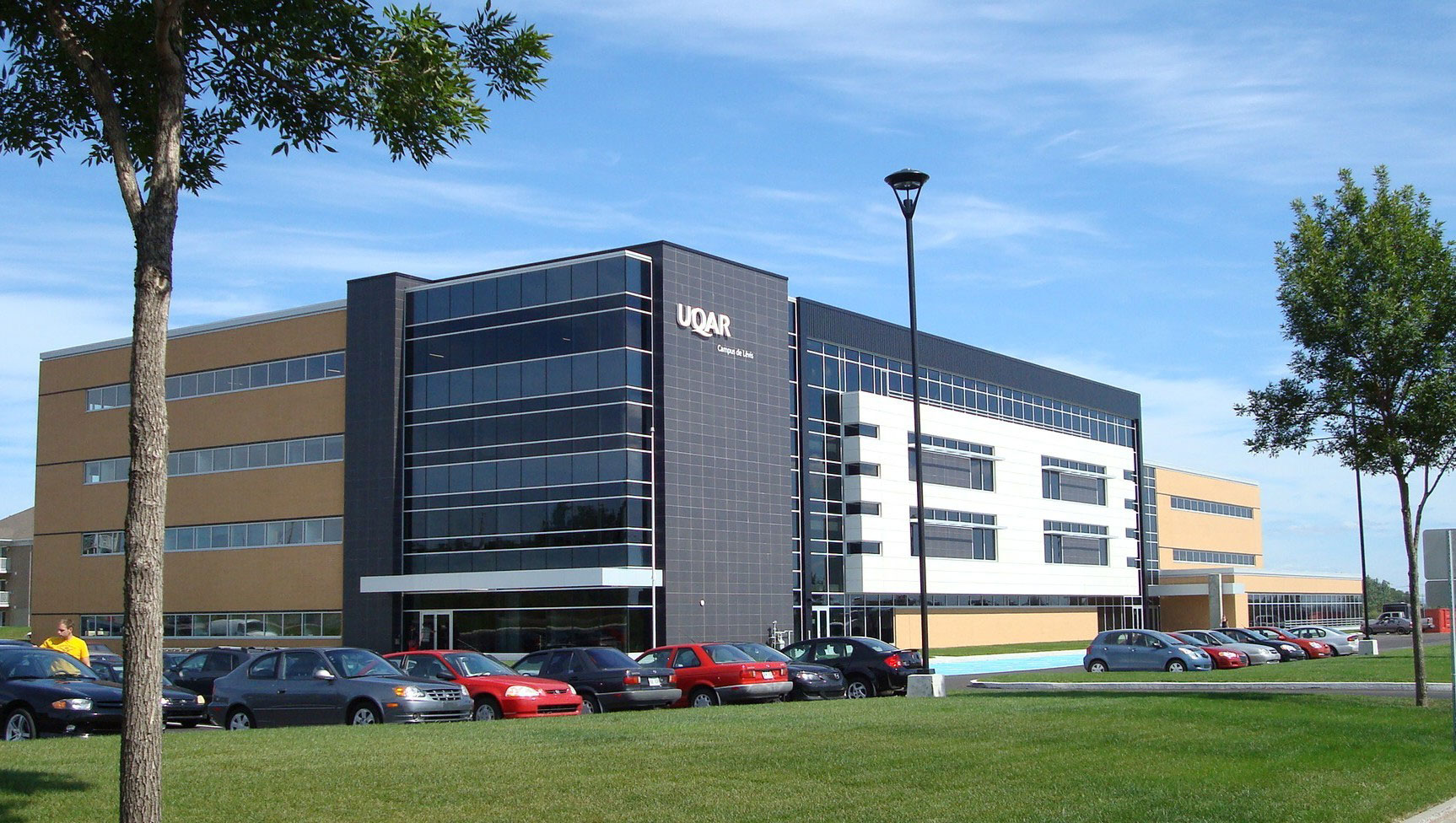
A building of the Lévis campus, erected in 2007

Rimouski is the administrative capital of the Lower St. Lawrence region, a maritime community and a university town that accommodates 15,000 students every year. Students represent about 30% of people living in the town of 50,000.

The Rimouski campus has 11 pavilions in addition to student residences. It also houses the Rimouski Institute of Marine Sciences (ISMER) and the Centre for Support for Innovation through Research (CAIR).

=== Lévis campus ===
In 1980, the university opened a second campus in Lévis, part of Québec's capital region. The Lévis campus enrolled about 3,000 students in 2020-2021.

UQAR offers academic training throughout eastern Quebec, including the regions of Chaudière-Appalaches, Gaspésie-Îles-de-la-Madeleine, Haute-Côte-Nord, and Manicouagan. It also has permanent offices in Gaspé and Rivière-du-Loup.

== Staff ==
The current university rector is François Deschênes, appointed in 2021.

== Students ==
UQAR has established more than 70 cooperation and exchange programs with 15 countries. Each year, UQAR welcomes approximately 550 international students.

As of 2025, more than 7,200 students are enrolled at UQAR, representing an increase of 3.6% from 2024, according to the university. Of these students, 1,304 are international students. The number of new registrations from international students decreased from 385 in 2024 to 243 in 2025.

== Academics ==
UQAR provides more than 160 academic programs, ranging from undergraduate to doctoral levels, across disciplines such as administration, biology, environmental and bioresource chemistry, regional development, education, ethics, engineering, geography, history, computer science, literature and creative writing, oceanography, psychosociology, accounting, nursing, and social work.

== Research ==
Marine science, regional development, and Nordic studies are the three major areas of research at UQAR.

From 2011 to 2019, UQAR was rated among the top three research universities offering primarily undergraduate courses by the independent firm, RE$EARCH Infosource Inc. Over a ten-year period from 1999 to 2009, UQAR's research funding increased from $3.8 million to $17.4 million.

The university is an active member of the University of the Arctic (UArctic). UArctic is an international cooperative network based in the Circumpolar Arctic region, consisting of more than 200 universities, colleges, and other organizations with an interest in promoting education and research in the Arctic region.

UQAR participates in UArctic's mobility program, north2north. The program aims to enable students from member institutions to study in different parts of the North.

=== Research units ===
Research units of UQAR
- Centre de développement et de recherche en imagerie numérique (CDRIN) (Centre for Digital Imaging Research and Development)
- Centre de la science de la biodiversité du Québec (CSBQ) (Quebec Centre for Biodiversity Science)
- Centre de recherche interuniversitaire sur la formation et la profession enseignante (CRIFPE-UQAR) (Interuniversity Research Centre on Training and the Teaching Profession)
- Centre de recherche sur le développement territorial (CRDT) (Territorial Development Research Centre)
- Centre de recherche sur les biotechnologies marines (CRBM) (Marine Biotechnology Research Centre)
- Centre de recherche sur les milieux insulaires et maritimes (CERMIM) (Centre for Research on Island and Maritime Environments)
- Centre d'étude de la forêt (CEF) (Centre for Forest Studies)
- Centre d'études nordiques (CEN) (Northern Studies Centre)
- Centre d'expertise universitaire voué au développement des organisations (CEUDO) (Centre of Academic Expertise Dedicated to Organizational Development)
- Centre d'initiation à la recherche et d'Aide au développement durable (CIRADD) (Centre for Introduction to Research and Sustainable Development Assistance)
- Centre d'innovation de l'aquaculture et des Pêches du Québec Merinov (Quebec Fishing and Aquaculture Innovation Centre)
- Centre Interdisciplinaire de Développement en Cartographie des Océans (CIDCO) (Interdisciplinary Development Centre for Ocean Mapping)
- Centre interuniversitaire de recherche sur la première modernité XVIe-XVIIIe siècles (CIREM 16-18) (Interuniversity Research Centre on the First Modernity of the Sixteenth to the Eighteenth Centuries (CIREM 16-18)
- Centre spécialisé de technologie physique Solution Novika (Specialized Centre of Physics Technology)
- Chaire CRSNG-UQAR en génie de la conception (NSERC-UQAR Research Chair in Design Engineering)
- Chaire de recherche du Canada en biodiversité nordique (Canada Research Chair on Northern Biodiversity)
- Chaire de recherche du Canada en biologie intégrative de la flore nordique (Canada Research Chair in Integrative Biology of Northern Flora)
- Chaire de recherche du Canada en écologie halieutique (Canada Research Chair in Fisheries Ecology)
- Chaire de recherche du Canada en géochimie des hydrogéosystèmes côtiers (Canada Research Chair in the Geochemistry of Coastal Hydrogeosystems)
- Chaire de recherche du Canada en géologie marine (Canada Research Chair in Marine Geology)
- Chaire de recherche du Canada en histoire littéraire et patrimoine imprimé (Canada Research Chair in Literary History and Printed Heritage)
- Chaire de recherche sur la forêt habitée (Research Chair for the Inhabited Forest)
- Chaire de recherche sur la persévérance scolaire et la littératie (Research Chair in Academic Motivation, Perseverance and Achievement)
- Chaire UNESCO en analyse intégrée des systèmes marins (UNESCO Chair in Integrated Analysis of Marine Systems)
- Collectif de recherche participative sur la pauvreté en milieu rural (CRPPMR) (Participatory Research Collective on Rural Poverty)
- Collectif de recherche sur la santé en région (CoRSeR) (Healthcare in Rural Areas Research Collective)
- Consortium InterEst Santé
- Consortium on climatology Ouranos
- Équipe de recherche en biotechnologies et chimie de l'environnement (CRABE) (Research Team on Environmental Biotechnology and Chemistry)
- Équipe de recherche en éthique (ÉTHOS) (Research Team on Ethics)
- Groupe de recherche en patrimoine (Heritage Research Group)
- Groupe de recherche interdisciplinaire sur le développement régional, de l'Est du Québec (GRIDEQ) (Research Group on Eastern Quebec Regional Development)
- Groupe de recherche sur les environnements nordiques BORÉAS (Northern Environment Research Group)
- Groupe interinstitutionnel de recherches océanographiques Québec-Océan (Inter-institution Oceanographic Research Group)
- Innovation maritime (Maritime Innovation)
- Institut des nutraceutiques et des aliments fonctionnels (INAF) (Functional Food and Nutraceutics Institute)
- Institut des sciences de la mer de Rimouski (UQAR-ISMER) (Marine Science Institute)
- Institut France-Québec pour la coopération scientifique en appui au secteur maritime (IFQM) (France-Quebec Institute for Scientific Cooperation in Support of the Maritime Sector)
- Marine Environmental Observation, Prediction and Response Network (MEOPAR)
- Notre Golfe (St. Lawrence Gulf Network)
- Observatoire global du Saint-Laurent (St. Lawrence Global Observatory)
- Réseau interuniversitaire québécois de formation avancée et de recherche en sciences du globe (GÉOTOP) (Quebec Inter-institution Network for Advanced Education and Research in Planetary Science)
- Réseau Québec maritime (RQM) (Quebec Maritime Network)
- Réseau Ressources Aquatiques Québec (RAQ) (Aquaculture Quebec Network)
- SErvice de Recherche et d'EXpertise en transformation des produits forestiers (SEREX) (Forest Product Processing Research and Expertise Services)
- TechnoCentre éolien
- University of the Arctic (UArctic)

=== Marine sciences ===
The Institut des sciences de la mer de l'Université du Québec à Rimouski (ISMER-UQAR) is the largest Francophone university research institute in marine science in Canada, and sponsors research projects related to this subject in Quebec.

=== Regional development ===
At the beginning of the Quiet Revolution in the 1960s, the Quebec and Canadian governments identified the Lower St. Lawrence and Gaspésie regions as future regions for social experimentation in the area of regional development.

UQAR is looking to better grasp the challenges facing regions in connection with current economic and societal changes. Researchers associated with this line of research analyse socioterritorial dynamics affecting regions and create tools for development assistance.

=== Arctic studies ===
UQAR is dedicated to the study of the Far North and cold lower latitudes. This research area involves a diversity of researchers with a multidisciplinary interest in northern environments across a number of highly complementary disciplines.

One of the major areas of study related to arctic studies at UQAR is the response of high-latitude environments and communities to climate change. The Canada Research Chair on Northern Biodiversity focuses on studying the impact of human activity and climate change on biodiversity in the North. The research unit also studies conservation, looking at species monitoring, habitat management and restoration, and animal migrations.

Research at UQAR also examines human and industrial development in the North, with a focus on sustainability, Indigenous studies, and rural studies.

== Honorary doctorates and other distinctions awarded by UQAR ==
=== Honorary doctorates ===
Université du Québec à Rimouski awards honorary doctorates to people who have made a significant contribution to the university, their profession, or to society. The university has awarded the following honorary doctorates:

- Louis-Marie Beaulieu (2025)
- Vivian Labrie (2025)
- Serge Payette (2025)
- Kim Thúy (2024)
- Mario Mimeault (2022)
- Normand Labrie (2019)
- Johnny Huard (2019)
- Paul Treguer (2014)
- Pierre-Maurice Vachon (2014)
- Jean-Guy Nadeau (2014)
- Michel Rouleau (2011)
- Laure Waridel (2011)
- Dany Laferrière (2010)
- Bernard Derome (2009)
- Élisabeth Carrier (2009)
- Rolande and Germain Pelletier (2008)
- Maurice Tanguay (2007)
- Jean Lemire (2007)
- Alain Caron (2007)
- Bernard Voyer (2005)
- Gérard Drainville (2004)
- Bernard Bélanger (2004)
- Loïc Bernard (2002)
- Pierre Dansereau (2002)
- Joseph Rouleau (2001)
- Pauline Charron (2000)
- Jean-Yves Gautier (1999)
- Léonard Parent (1998)
- Pascal Parent (1994)
- Jules Bélanger (1994)
- Lisette Morin (1993)
- René Simon (1992)
- Charles Beaulieu (1991)
- Claire L'Heureux-Dubé (1989)
- Gilles Vigneault (1978)
- Ernest Lepage (1977)

=== Université du Québec à Rimouski medal ===
The Université du Québec à Rimouski medal is awarded to people in recognition of their contribution to the development of a sector related to one of the university's main missions: teaching, research, and service to the community. The university awarded the following medals:

- Suzanne Tremblay (2018)
- Léonard Otis and Gilles Roy (2012)
- Mariano Mémolli and José Luis Esperón (2011)
- Fire department of the City of Rimouski Fire Safety Service (2009)
- Paul Bellemare (2009)
- Adéodat St-Pierre (2005)
- Jacqueline Caron (2004)
- André P. Casgrain (2002)
- Jamie Salé and David Pelletier (2001)
- Rimouski Océanic QMJHL hockey team (2000)
- Louis Legendre (1999)
- Guillaume Leblanc (1992)
- Pierre Harvey (1988)
- René Simon (1987)
- Philippe (Phil) Latulippe (1986)
- Jean Lapointe (1986)
- Alice Parizeau (1983)
- Anne-Marie Roy (1981)

== See also ==
- Rimouski
- Lévis, Quebec
- The Cégep de Rimouski
