= Edna Frida Pietsch =

American composer

Edna Frida Pietsch (7 May 1894 - 16 July 1982) was an American composer and music educator who composed in many genres through at least opus 24. Some of her orchestral works were performed by the Chicago Symphony Orchestra.

Pietsch was born in Milwaukee, Wisconsin, to Ida and Ferdinand Pietsch. She attended the Chicago Conservatory of Music and studied composition, piano and violin with Bernard Dieter, Carl Eppert, Rudolf Kopp, William Middelschutte and Ida Schroeder. She taught at the Wisconsin Conservatory of Music from 1942 to 1966, and belonged to the National Guild of Piano Teachers.

Pietsch once compared modern music to a garbage dump, noting that if you were around it long enough, it stopped smelling. Composer Joseph Skornicka noted that Pietsch’s compositions. . . “have just enough of the modern idiom to make them interesting to the above average listener and still remain definitely romantic.” She received many awards in annual contests sponsored by the Wisconsin Federation of Music Clubs and the Wisconsin State Fair.

Pietsch’s works, including some unpublished manuscripts, are archived at the Mills Music LIbrary at the University of Wisconsin -Madison. Her music was recorded commercially by Albany Records (TROY 1749), and published by J.Fischer & Bro., Schmitt, Hall & McCreary Co., Southern Music and Theodore Presser Company. Her compositions include:

== Chamber ==
- Canzonetta for horn & piano
- Largo Appassionata (violin, viola and piano)
- Miniature Suite for Woodwind Quintet (edited by Don McCathren)
- Piano Quintet
- String Quartet in D Major
- Suite for Harp
- Woodland Fantasy (flute and piano)

== Orchestra ==
- Fantasy for Orchestra
- Five Oriental Impressions
- Symphony
- Two Piano Concertos
- Viola Concerto

== Organ ==
- Large Eroica for Organ

== Piano ==
- Berceuse
- Five Poems
- Prelude (for two pianos/four hands)
- Sonata

== Vocal ==
- Neun Lieder, opus 6 no. 1-6 (texts by Heinrich Heine and Irmgard Roemheld)
