= Alain Caron (bassist) =

Canadian jazz bassist

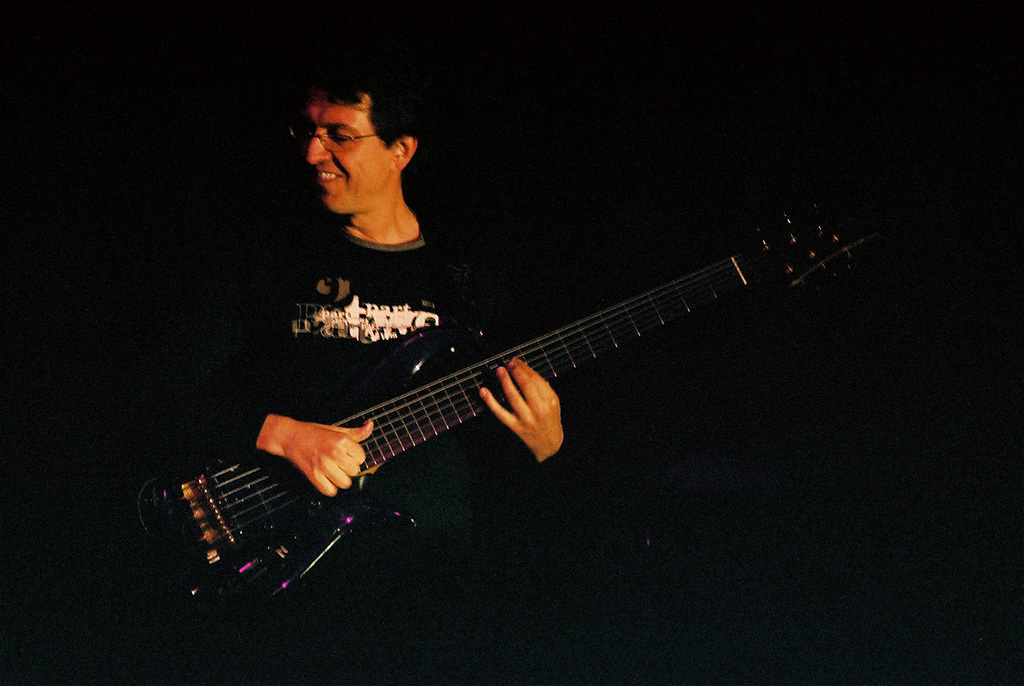
- Alain Caron at JazzFe 2006

Background information
- Born: May 5, 1955 (age 71); Saint-Éloi, Quebec, Canada
- Genres: Jazz, jazz fusion
- Occupation: Musician
- Instrument: Bass guitar
- Member of: Uzeb
- Website: alaincaron.com

Alain Caron (born May 5, 1955) is a Canadian jazz bassist. With virtuosic talent, Caron is among the most highly-regarded jazz bassists of his generation, famous for playing fretless and 6-string electric bass.

== Early life ==
The youngest of 11 children, Caron started playing bass at age 11 and began pursuing jazz at age 15. His musical skills were formalised by correspondence lessons with the jazz improvisation teacher Charlie Banacos and by attending a summer session at Berklee College of Music.

== Uzeb ==
In 1976, Caron co-founded the jazz fusion band UZEB and played with the group until its breakup in 1992. The group has sold over 400,000 albums, an unprecedented number for a Canadian jazz fusion group.

== Solo career ==
In 1993, Caron embarked on a solo career, releasing albums as Le Band. He has performed with Billy Cobham, Mike Stern, Dennis Chambers, Tom Harrell and many others, as well as recording with Leni Stern, Celine Dion, and Gino Vannelli. In 2007 he was given an honorary doctorate by the University of Quebec and received the Oscar Peterson Lifetime Achievement Award by the Montreal International Jazz Festival in 1991.

== Solo discography ==
- Caron - Ecay - Lockwood (1992)
- Le Band (1993)
- Rhythm 'n Jazz (1995)
- Play (1997)
- Call Me Al (2000)
- 5 (2003)
- Conversations (2007)
- Sep7entrion (2010)
- Multiple Faces (2013)

== Books ==
- Rhythm 'n Jazz – Ultimate Play-Along for Bass: Jam With Alain Caron and His Band Le Band (1998) ISBN 0-9684633-1-2 ISBN 978-0-9684633-1-4
- Play – Ultimate Play-Along for Bass: Jam With Alain Caron and His Band Le Band (1999) ISBN 0-9684633-1-2 ISBN 978-0-9684633-1-4

== Instrument ==
Luthier George Furlanetto of F Bass in Hamilton, Ontario, has built basses for Caron since the eighties. Furlanetto worked with Caron to develop the F Bass Alain Caron model (AC6), which has the tone of a solid body fretless with the dynamic characteristics of an acoustic guitar.

== Awards and distinctions ==
- Félix Awards for both "Group of the Year" and "Jazz Album of the Year".
- With Uzeb, the Oscar Peterson Lifetime Achievement Award, presented at the 1991 Montreal International Jazz Festival.
- On August 30, 2007, the University of Quebec at Rimouski (UQAR), presented an honorary doctorate to Caron.
- Member of the Order of Canada.
