= Charlie Banacos =

American jazz musician

Charlie Banacos (August 11, 1946 – December 8, 2009) was an American pianist, composer, author and educator, concentrating on jazz.

Banacos created over 100 courses of study for improvisation and composition. His concepts of teaching and his courses influenced educators since the late 1950s. He was the original author of courses named "Hexatonics", "Intervallics", "Tetratonics", "Superimpositions", "Harps", "Overlaps", "Bitonal Pendulums", "Double Mambos", "Twenty-third Chords", "Tonal Paralypsis", and "Triad Pairs," among others. These and many of his other terms for his courses have become part of the basic lexicon in jazz education.

His students and musical associates included Alain Caron, Joe Hubbard, Mike Stern, Danilo Perez, Wayne Krantz, Jeff Berlin, Garry Dial, Barry M. Silverman, Gerard D'Angelo, Vic Juris, Hartmut Hillmann, Daryl Rhodes, Stephen Page, Michael Brecker, Jerry Bergonzi, Melissa Kassel, Marilyn Crispell, John Novello, Bruce Arnold, Leni Stern, Rachel Z, Gustavo Assis-Brasil, Jeff Golub, Frank Singer, and classical composer Bruce Wolosoff. His exercises have circulated through books, videos, clinics, lectures and courses at such institutions such as Berklee College of Music, Boston, The New School in New York, Manhattan School of Music New York, New England Conservatory of Music, Longy School of Music among others.

The ear-training methods devised by Banacos specifically for the improvising musician are imitated in college courses and ear-training routines by many educators around the world. His original concept of dealing with relative-pitch exercises, using cadences and recognition of one tone at a time to the progressing of the recognition of clusters of sounds in a key up to all twelve tones simultaneously, and also the memorization of pitches without reference to a key, was developed to enable musicians to hear equally well in tonal and atonal situations both in improvised situations and in pre-conceived settings. Central to Banacos' ideas was his view that the teaching of ear-training techniques should be individually tailored to each musician, because each person has individual neurological pathways pre-arranged in the brain. According to Banacos, without proper ear-training advanced music making will sound mechanical and soulless.

Banacos performed with Roy Haynes, Teddy Kotick, Charlie Mariano, Harvie S., and Jerry Bergonzi in both jazz and classical idioms. His students have performed or recorded with Duke Ellington, Miles Davis, Maynard Ferguson, Chick Corea, Wynton Marsalis, David Liebman, Wayne Shorter, Michael Brecker and Joe Henderson, among others.

As of 2009 he was on the faculty of New England Conservatory of Music in Boston and Longy School of Music, and had served on the faculty of Berklee College of Music in Boston. He also served as a clinician for the Thelonious Monk Institute and as adjunct faculty member for the following institutions:

- New School for Social Research, New York City
- Empire College/SUNY, New York
- Williams College, Williamstown, MA USA
- University of Massachusetts Amherst, Amherst, MA USA
- Massachusetts Institute of Technology, Cambridge
- Harvard University, Cambridge

== Books ==
- Banacos, Charlie (1972). Pentatonic Scale Improvisation. Boston, MA: published by the author.
- Banacos, Charlie (1972). Tonal Paralypsis: Book 1. Boston, MA: published by the author.
- Banacos, Charlie (1972). Tonal Paralypsis: Book 2. Boston, MA: published by the author.
- Banacos, Charlie (1972). Voicings in Clusters. Boston, MA: published by the author.
- Banacos, Charlie (1972). Voicings in 5ths. Boston, MA: published by the author.
- Banacos, Charlie (1972). Voicings in 4ths. Boston, MA: published by the author.
