= Ludwik Konopko =

Polish guitarist and composer (1970–2024)

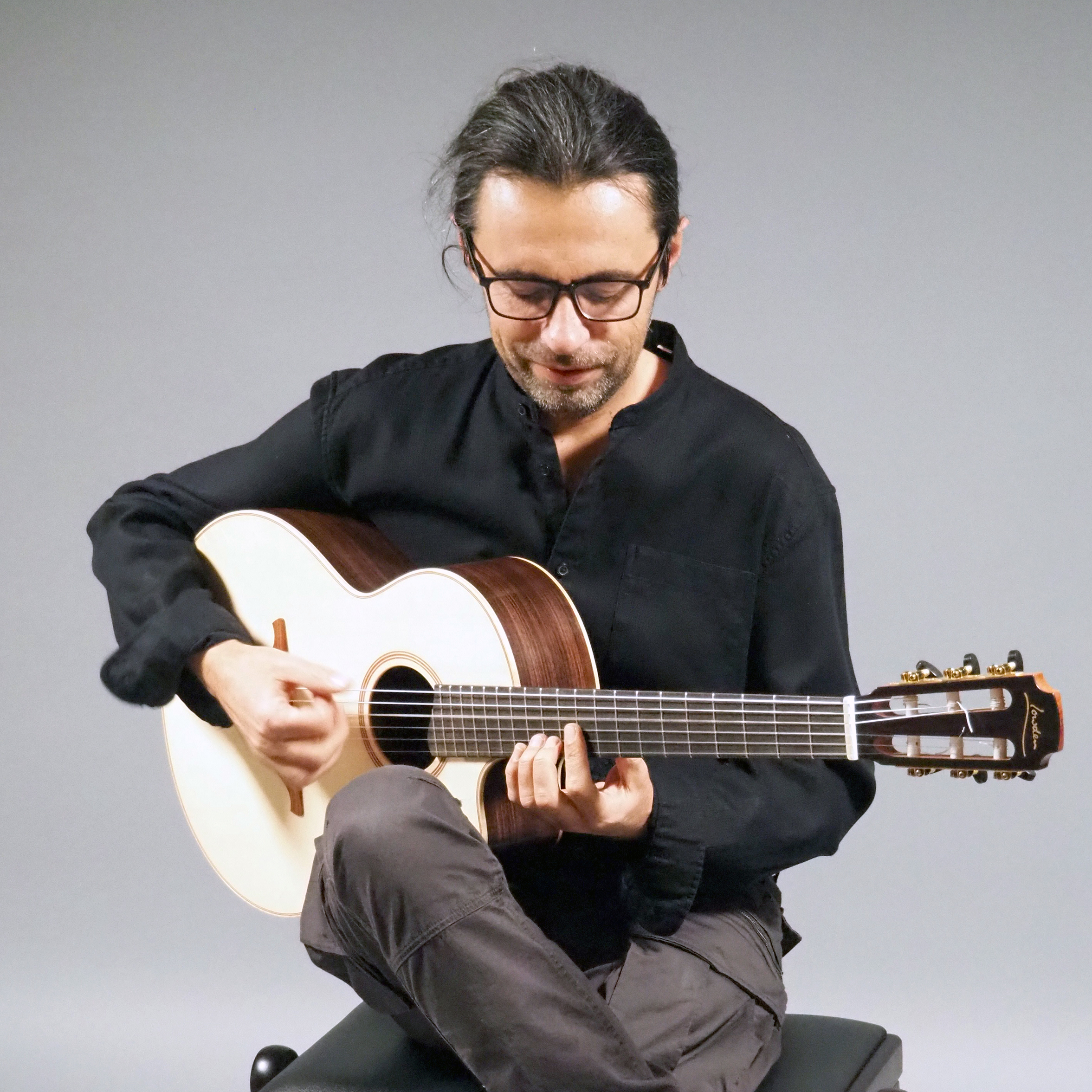

Background information
- Born: 7 December 1970; Lviv, Ukrainian SSR, USSR
- Died: 6 July 2024 (aged 53) Katowice, Poland
- Genres: Jazz; Blues; World music
- Occupations: guitarist, composer, arranger
- Instrument: guitar
- Years active: 1989–2024
- Formerly of: Tea Fan Club, Cocotier, Acoustic Travel Band, Que Passa, Pilar, ZOA Band
- Website: https://ludwikkonopko.bandcamp.com

Ludwik Konopko (7 December 1970 – 6 July 2024) was a Polish guitarist, composer, and arranger. His guitar music incorporates elements of blues, jazz, flamenco, and world music. He was the leader of the ZOA Band and a member of the Pilar group. He also collaborated with the well-recognized Polish flamenco group Que Passa. Earlier, he was a leader of Acoustic Travel Band and a co-founder of the Cocotier band. Konopko was a multi-competition finalist, and his independently produced records, covering mostly his own compositions, were sold in tens of thousands of copies.

== Musical biography ==
Konopko was born in Lviv in western Ukraine. He had his first public appearance as a guitarist at the age of 19, when he performed in an orchestra conducted by the composer Virko Baley at the Lviv National Philharmonic. In 1989 together with Oleh Suk he created his first band Tea Fan Club (TFC) in Lviv. The art-rock group quickly became very popular and attracted other well-recognized musicians, like Oleksandr Ksenofontov or Vlad DeBriansky. In 1990 the TFC band performed during the youth festival of alternative culture Vyvych. Tea Fan Club is still considered today a legendary musical project in Ukraine.

From 1991 Konopko lived in Poland. In 1999 he created the band Cocotier together with Andrzej Krośniak and in 2002 Konopko founded his own Acoustic Travel Band. Both groups performed all over Europe for several years and participated in many musical festivals, among others, in Ferrara, Novara, Olegio, and Orte. Their records, including primarily compositions and arrangements by Konopko, were sold in tens of thousands of copies. In 2005 Konopko performed with Acoustic Travel Band as support before the world acclaimed guitarist Al di Meola at the Non-Stop Festival in Wroclaw.

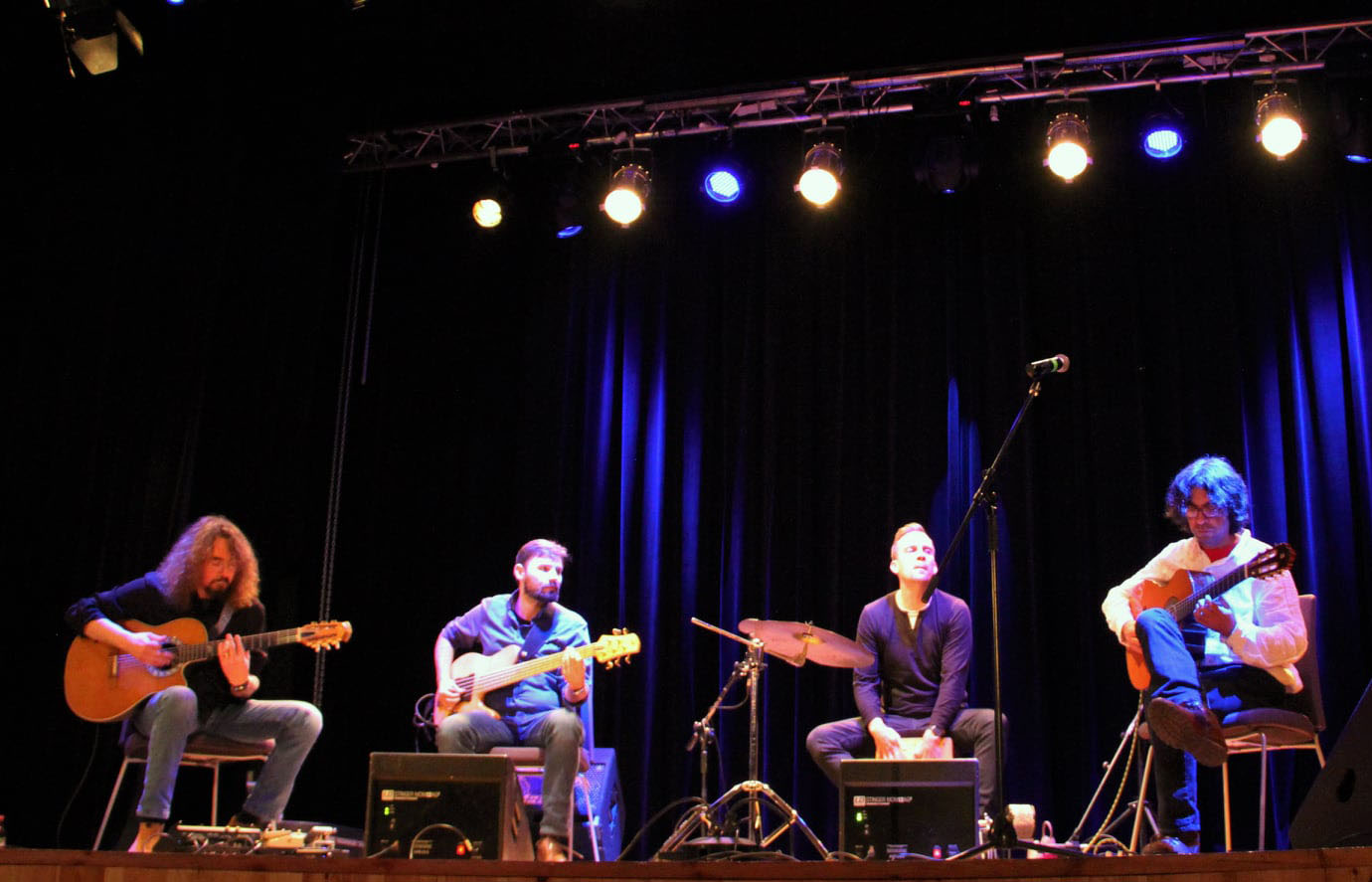
ZOA Band (Ludwik Konopko, Piotr Radecki, Michał Łyp) with Mirek Hady. Katowice 2020.

From 2014 to 2016 Konopko collaborated with the integrative entertainment group with theatrical and musical background Drzewo a Gada in Katowice. Between 2016 and 2018 he cooperated with one of the best Polish flamenco fusion groups Que Passa. They performed together on many tours and participated in several festivals, among others, in Landshut, Rudolstadt or Lund.

From 2012 to 2024 Konopko was a part of the Pilar band. In 2019 he founded his own ZOA Band and remained its leader until 2024. Konopko invited to the group very experienced musicians, who inspired each other and enjoyed playing together. They performed original compositions by Konopko and guitar covers of other authors.

The guitar music of Konopko combines several styles, among others blues, jazz, flamenco, and world music. Moreover, in his compositions and arrangements, he often used complex multi-instrumental layouts. For his songs, Konopko received a Special Mention from the Jury of the International Songwriting Awards (UK) and an Honorable Mention from the Jury of the 2022 Unsigned Only Music Competition (USA). He was also a finalist of the 20th and 21st UK Songwriter Contest (UK), the 18th International Acoustic Music Awards (USA), and the 23rd Annual Great American Song Contest (USA). His creativity, musical feeling, extraordinary guitar technique, and freedom of improvisation gained him many fans. Konopko performed solo and with other musicians and bands for more than three decades. Often, he could be spotted unexpectedly outdoors in different cities of Poland where he promoted his records among people.

Konopko died on 6 July 2024, at the age of 53. He was buried at the cemetery on Sienkiewicza Street in Katowice.

== Discography ==
- Cafe Sanacja – Cocotier (2001)
- Acoustic Travel – Acoustic Travel Band (2002)
- Kundzia – Acoustic Travel Band (2005)
- Come Back – Acoustic Travel Band (2007)
- O.K. – Acoustic Travel Band (2008)
- Twarze (2010)
- Taruna (2012)
- Nasze Poddasze – Pilar (2014)
- Free Time (2016, 2021)
- Skrzydła – Pilar (2020)
- RAIA (2021)
- Serenity (2023)
