= List of bebop musicians =

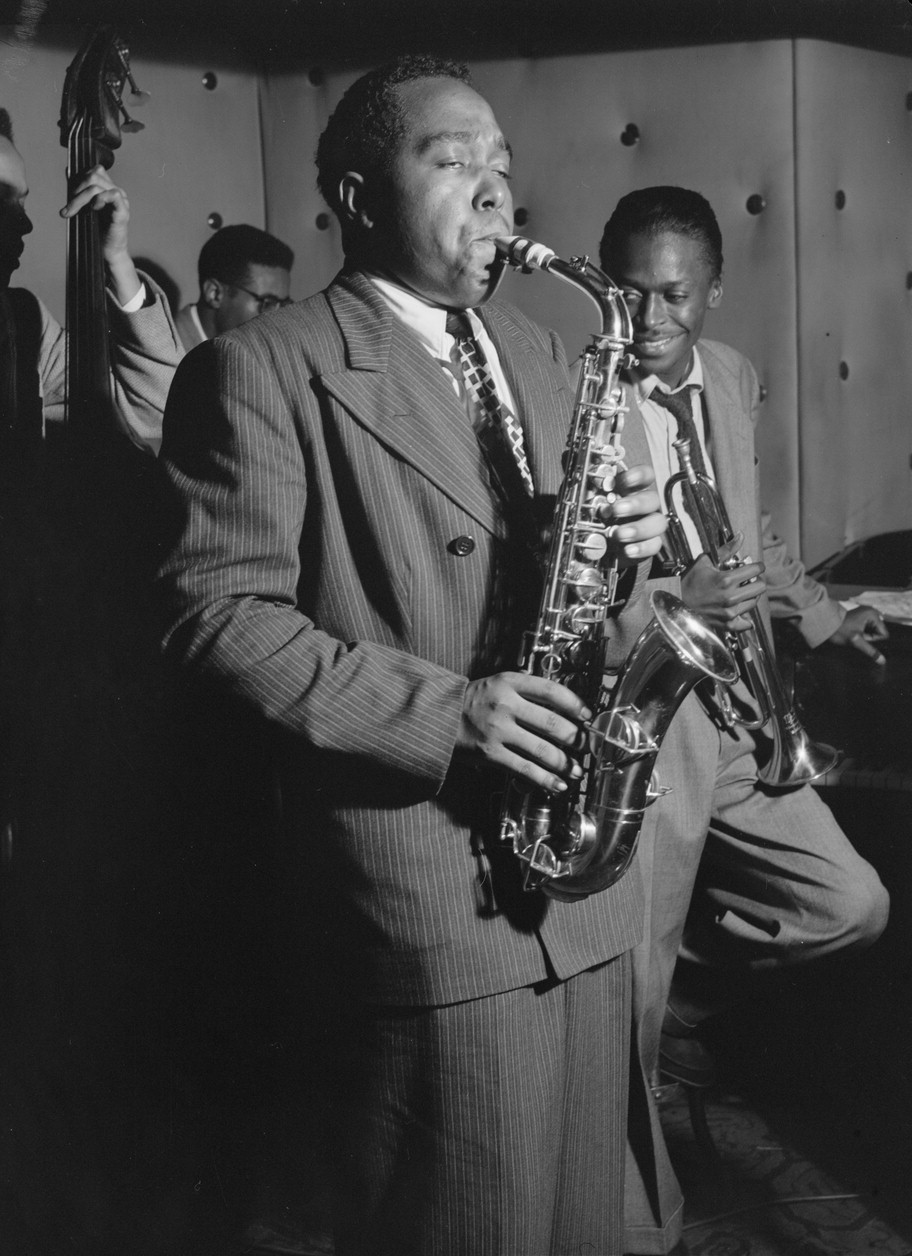

Alto saxophonist Charlie Parker was a leading performer and composer of the bebop era. He is pictured here with Tommy Potter, Max Roach and Miles Davis at the Three Deuces club in New York City.

Bebop or bop is a style of jazz developed in the early to mid-1940s in the United States. It is characterized by a fast tempo, complex chord progressions—with rapid chord changes, changes of key, and substitute chords—along with virtuosic improvisation based on a combination of harmonic structure, scales, and occasional references to the melody.

Bebop developed as the younger generation of jazz musicians expanded the creative possibilities of jazz beyond the popular, dance-oriented swing music-style to a new "musician's music" that was not as danceable and demanded close listening. As bebop was not intended for dancing, it enabled the musicians to play at faster tempos. Bebop musicians explored advanced harmonies, complex syncopation, altered chords, extended chords, chord substitutions, asymmetrical phrasing, and intricate melodies. Bebop groups used rhythm sections in a way that expanded their role. Whereas the key ensemble of the swing music era was the big band of 16–18 musicians playing in an ensemble-based style, the classic bebop group was a small combo that consisted of saxophone (alto or tenor), trumpet, piano, guitar, double bass, and drums playing music in which the ensemble played a supportive role for soloists. Rather than play heavily arranged music, bebop musicians typically played the melody of a composition (called the "head") with the accompaniment of the rhythm section, followed by a section in which each of the performers improvised a solo, then returned to the melody at the end of the composition.

== A ==
- Al Aarons - trumpet
- Greg Abate - saxophone
- Nat Adderley - cornet
- Julian "Cannonball" Adderley - saxophone
- Toshiko Akiyoshi - piano
- Joe Albany - piano
- Monty Alexander
- Jimmy Amadie
- Georgie Auld
- Gene Ammons - saxophone

== B ==
- Elek Bacsik - violin
- Benny Bailey - trumpet
- Sheryl Bailey - guitar
- Gabe Baltazar - alto saxophone
- Guy Barker - trumpet
- Louie Bellson - drums
- Eddie Bert - trombone
- Denzil Best - drums
- Walter Bishop, Jr. - piano
- Art Blakey - drums
- DuPree Bolton - trumpet
- Nelson Boyd - bass
- Randy Brecker - trumpet
- Clifford Brown - trumpet
- Ray Brown - bass
- Dave Brubeck - piano
- Clora Bryant - trumpet
- Ray Bryant
- Monty Budwig
- Ralph Burns
- Kenny Burrell - guitar
- Don Byas - saxophone
- Charlie Byrd

== C ==
- Red Callender - bass
- Conte Candoli - trumpet
- Pete Candoli - trumpet
- Candido Camero - percussion
- Serge Chaloff - saxophone
- Frank Capp
- Charlie Christian - guitar
- Sonny Clark - piano
- Kenny Clarke - drums
- Jimmy Cleveland - trombone
- Tony Coe - clarinet, saxophone
- Al Cohn - saxophone
- Dolo Coker - piano
- Richie Cole - saxophone
- George Coleman - saxophone
- John Coltrane - saxophone
- Sonny Criss - saxophone

== D ==
- Tadd Dameron - piano
- Eddie "Lockjaw" Davis - saxophone
- Miles Davis - trumpet
- Blossom Dearie - piano, vocals
- Rusty Dedrick - trumpet
- Buddy DeFranco - clarinet
- Paul Desmond - alto saxophone
- Paquito D'Rivera - saxophone, clarinet
- Jimmy Deuchar - trumpet
- Lou Donaldson - saxophone
- Kenny Dorham - trumpet
- Bob Dorough - piano, vocals
- George Duvivier - bass

== E ==
- Billy Eckstine - vocals, trumpet, trombonist, composer, bandleader
- Teddy Edwards - saxophone
- Herb Ellis - guitar
- Rolf Ericson - trumpet
- Bill Evans - piano, composer

== F ==
- John Faddis - trumpet
- Tal Farlow - guitar
- Art Farmer - trumpet, flugelhorn
- Leonard Feather - piano
- Ella Fitzgerald - singer
- Claudio Fasoli - saxophonist
- Tommy Flanagan - piano
- Gary Foster

== G ==
- Barry Galbraith - guitar
- Hal Galper - piano
- Red Garland - piano
- Linton Garner - piano
- Herb Geller - saxophone
- Stan Getz - saxophone
- Terry Gibbs - vibraphone
- Dizzy Gillespie - trumpet
- Benny Golson - saxophone
- Babs Gonzales - vocals
- Dexter Gordon - saxophone
- Wardell Gray - saxophone
- Bennie Green - trombone
- Grant Green - guitar
- Thurman Green
- Urbie Green - trombone
- Al Grey - trombone
- Johnny Griffin - saxophone
- Tiny Grimes - guitar
- Lars Gullin - saxophone

== H ==
- Shafi Hadi - alto saxophone
- Al Haig - piano
- Sadik Hakim - piano
- Jeff Hamilton
- Jimmy Hamilton - clarinet, saxophone
- Slide Hampton - trombone
- George Handy
- Al Harewood
- Barry Harris - piano
- Benny Harris - trumpet
- Clyde Hart - piano
- Stan Hasselgard - clarinet
- Hampton Hawes - piano
- Coleman Hawkins - saxophone
- Tubby Hayes - saxophone, vibraphone, flute
- Roy Haynes - drums
- J.C. Heard - drums
- Albert Heath - drums
- Jimmy Heath - saxophone
- Percy Heath - double-bass
- Ernie Henry - saxophone
- Earl Hines - piano
- Jutta Hipp - piano
- Red Holloway - saxophone
- Elmo Hope - piano
- Freddie Hubbard - trumpet

== J ==
- Chubby Jackson - double-bass
- Milt Jackson - vibraphone
- Illinois Jacquet - tenor saxophone
- Ahmad Jamal - piano
- Keith Jarrett - piano
- Clifford Jarvis - drums
- Aaron M. Johnson - saxophone, clarinet
- Budd Johnson - saxophone, clarinet
- Clarence Johnson
- J. J. Johnson - trombone
- Osie Johnson - drums
- Pete Jolly
- Hank Jones - piano
- Oliver Jones (pianist)
- Philly Joe Jones - drums
- Quincy Jones - arranger, trumpet
- Thad Jones - trumpet
- Duke Jordan - piano
- Clifford Jordan - alto, tenor saxophones

== K ==
- Yoko Kanno - piano, accordion
- Roger Kellaway
- Wynton Kelly - piano
- Barney Kessel - guitar

== L ==
- Don Lamond - drums
- Jay Leonhart
- Stan Levey - drums
- Lou Levy - piano
- John Lewis - piano
- Mel Lewis - drums
- Victor Lewis
- Melba Liston - trombone

== M ==
- Adam Makowicz - piano
- Russell Malone - guitar
- Junior Mance - piano
- Shelly Manne - drums
- Larance Marable - drums
- Charlie Mariano - alto saxophone
- Dodo Marmarosa - piano
- Les McCann - piano
- Rob McConnell - valve trombone
- Howard McGhee - trumpet
- Al McKibbon - double-bass
- Marian McPartland - piano
- Charles McPherson - alto saxophone
- Gil Melle - saxophones
- Pierre Michelot - bass
- Charles Mingus - double-bass
- Thelonious Monk - piano
- J.R. Monterose - tenor saxophone
- Tete Montoliu - piano
- James Moody - tenor saxophone, flute
- Michael Moore - bass
- Michael Moore - saxophone, clarinet
- Joe Morello - drums
- Lee Morgan - trumpet
- George Morrow - double-bass
- Gerry Mulligan - baritone saxophone, piano, arranger

== N ==
- Fats Navarro - trumpet
- Herbie Nichols - piano
- Sam Noto - trumpet

== O ==
- Anita O'Day - vocals
- Hod O'Brien - piano

== P ==
- Marty Paich - arranger
- Remo Palmier - guitar
- Charlie Parker - saxophone
- Leo Parker - saxophone
- Joe Pass - guitar
- Cecil Payne - flute, saxophone
- Sonny Payne - drums
- Niels-Henning Ørsted Pedersen - double-bass
- Art Pepper - saxophone
- Oscar Peterson - piano
- Oscar Pettiford - cellist, double-bass
- Flip Phillips - saxophone, clarinet
- Herb Pomeroy - trumpet
- Roy Porter - drums
- Tommy Potter - bass
- Bud Powell - piano
- Richie Powell - piano
- Specs Powell - drums
- Chano Pozo - percussion
- André Previn - piano
- Don Pullen - piano, organ

== R ==
- Gene Ramey - bass
- Jimmy Raney - guitar
- Buddy Rich - drums
- Sam Rivers - saxophone, clarinet
- Max Roach - drums
- Steve Rochinski - guitar
- Red Rodney - trumpet
- Sonny Rollins - saxophone
- Jimmy Rowles - piano
- Ernie Royal - trumpet
- Hilton Ruiz - piano
- Curly Russell - bass

== S ==
- Aaron Sachs - saxophone, clarinet
- Ronnie Scott - saxophone
- Jack Sels - saxophone
- Lalo Schifrin - piano
- Ed Shaughnessy - drummer
- George Shearing - piano
- Jack Sheldon - trumpet, vocals
- Sahib Shihab - saxophone, flute
- Ayako Shirasaki - piano
- Horace Silver - piano
- Andy Simpkins
- Zoot Sims - saxophone
- Ronnie Singer - guitar
- Paul Smith - piano
- Mary Stallings - singer
- Herbie Steward - saxophones
- Sonny Stitt - saxophone
- Idrees Sulieman - trumpet
- Ira Sullivan - trumpet, flugelhorn

== T ==
- Art Taylor - drums
- Billy Taylor - piano
- Tommy Tedesco - guitar
- Clark Terry - trumpet, flugelhorn
- Toots Thielemans - harmonica
- Jesper Thilo - saxophone, clarinet, flute
- Ed Thigpen - drums
- René Thomas - guitar
- "Sir" Charles Thompson - piano
- Lucky Thompson - saxophone
- Lennie Tristano - piano
- Bruce Turner - saxophone, clarinet
- McCoy Tyner - piano

== U ==
- René Urtreger - piano

== V ==
- Charlie Ventura - saxophone
- Sarah Vaughan - vocals
- Mads Vinding - bass
- Eddie Vinson - saxophone

== W ==
- George Wallington - piano
- Butch Warren - double-bass
- Bill Watrous - trombone
- Frank Wess - saxophone, flute
- Ernie Wilkins - saxophone
- Mary Lou Williams - piano
- Shadow Wilson - drums
- Kai Winding - trombone
- Phil Woods - saxophone, clarinet

== Z ==
- Ed Zandy - trumpet

== See also ==
- List of jazz musicians
