= Steve Herberman =

American jazz guitarist and educator (born 1966)

- Born: September 10, 1966 (age 59)
- Origin: United States
- Genres: Jazz
- Occupations: Musician; music educator
- Instrument: Guitar
- Label: Reach Music

Steve Herberman (born September 10, 1966) is an American jazz guitarist and educator.

== Career ==
Herberman is a graduate of the Berklee College of Music. In 1993, he adopted playing the seven-string guitar. He has performed across the United States and Europe. In the U.S., he has performed at venues such as Birdland and the Bar Next Door in New York City, Spazio in Los Angeles, and the NAMM shows in Anaheim and Nashville. Closer to his home, near Washington, D.C., he has performed at Blues Alley, the Smithsonian Jazz Cafe, and the Kennedy Center. He has performed with Keter Betts, Buster Williams, Gary Bartz, Drew Gress, Chuck Berghofer, Jim Snidero, Chuck Redd, Ali Ryerson, Steve Williams, Steve LaSpina, Jeff Hirshfield, and John Pisano.

== As educator ==
Herberman taught at Towson University in Baltimore for fourteen years as an adjunct faculty member. He has presented masterclasses in Italy, the UK, and at universities across the U.S. He has written instructional material for DownBeat magazine, Mel Bay's Guitar Sessions, Just Jazz Guitar, the National Guitar Workshop newsletter, and columns for Modern Guitars and Fingerstyle Guitar Journal webzines. He is an online instructor and producer of jazz instructional videos.

== Critical reception ==
Herberman's composition "What We Do" won first place in the jazz category at the 2018 USA Songwriting Competition. His recordings have received praise from JazzTimes, DownBeat, and Jazz Improv. His album Action:Reaction was chosen as one of the top 50 CD's of 2007 by Jazz Improv. He has been featured on the cover of Just Jazz Guitar magazine (February 2009) and Fingerstyle Guitar Journal (October 2015).

He has released four albums as leader and two as co-leader. His 2008 album Ideals reached the Top 10 on the JazzWeek chart for national airplay, charting for 16 weeks.

== Discography ==
=== As leader/co-leader ===
- Thoughtlines (Reach Music, 2001)
- Action:Reaction (Reach Music, 2006)
- Ideals (Reach Music, 2008)
- Between Friends (2015)
- A Little Closer (2018)
- Counterbalance (2019)
