= World music (term) =

Western musical category

The term "world music", meaning folk music from around the world, has been credited to ethnomusicologist Robert E. Brown, who coined it in the early 1960s at Wesleyan University in Connecticut, where he developed undergraduate through doctoral programs in the discipline. To enhance the learning process (John Hill), he invited more than a dozen visiting performers from Africa and Asia and began a world music concert series.

The term became current in the 1980s as a marketing and classificatory device in the media and the music industry. There are several conflicting definitions for world music. One is that it consists of "all the music in the world", though such a broad definition renders the term virtually meaningless.

The term also is taken as a classification of music that combines Western popular music styles with one of many genres of non-Western music that are also described as folk music or ethnic music. However, world music is not exclusively traditional folk music. It may include pop music styles as well. Succinctly, it can be described as "local music from out there", or "someone else's local music". It is a term with an increasing number of genres that fall under the umbrella of world music to capture musical trends of combined ethnic style and texture, including Western elements.

== Evolving terminology ==
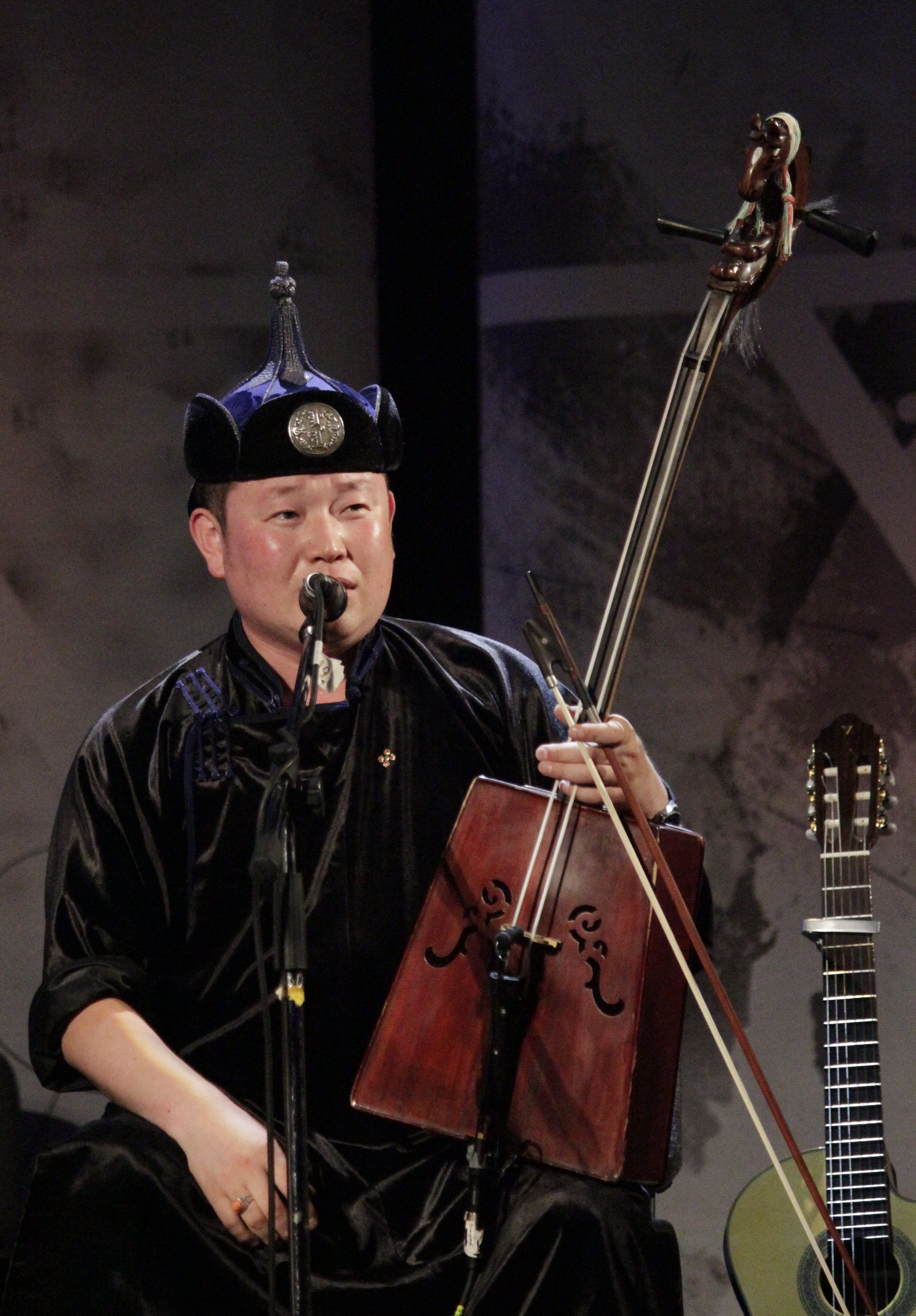
Anda Union at a music festival

In the age of digital music production the increased availability of high-quality, ethnic music samples, sound bites and loops from every known region are commonly used in commercial music production, which has exposed a vast spectrum of indigenous music texture to developing, independent artists.

An amalgamation of roots music in the global, contemporary listening palette has become apparent, which weakens the role major entertainment labels such as Columbia, Warner, MCA and EMI can play in the cultural perception of genre boundaries.

Similar terminology between distinctly different sub-categories under primary music genres, such as world, rock and pop, can be as ambiguous and confusing to industry moguls as it is to consumers. As Damian Burns writes, this is especially true in the context of world music, where branches of ethnically influenced pop trends are as genre-defined by consumer perception as they are by the music industry forums that govern the basis for categorical distinction. Academic scholars tend to agree that, in today's world of consumer music reviews and blogging, global music culture's public perception is what ultimately distils a prevailing basis for definition from genre ambiguity, regardless of how clearly a category has been outlined by corporate marketing forums and music journalism. The world music genre's gradual migration from a clear spectrum of roots music traditions to an extended list of hybrid subgenres is a good example of the motion genre boundaries can exhibit in a globalizing pop culture.

The classic, original definition of world music was in part created to instill a perceived authenticity and distinction between indigenous music traditions and those that eventually become diluted by pop culture, and the modern debate over how possible it is to maintain that perception in the richly diverse genre of world music is ongoing.

In a report on the 2014 globalFEST, National Public Radio's Anastasia Tsioulcas said, "Even within the 'world music' community, nobody likes the term 'world music'. It smacks of all kinds of loaded issues, from cultural colonialism to questions about what's 'authentic' and what isn't (and who might get to police such inquiries), and forces an incredible array of styles that don't have anything in common under the label of 'exotic Other.' What's more: I believe that in many people's imaginations, 'world music' means a kind of fairly awful, gloppy, hippy-ish, worldbeat fusion. It's a problematic, horrible term that satisfies absolutely no one."

== 1987 industry meeting ==
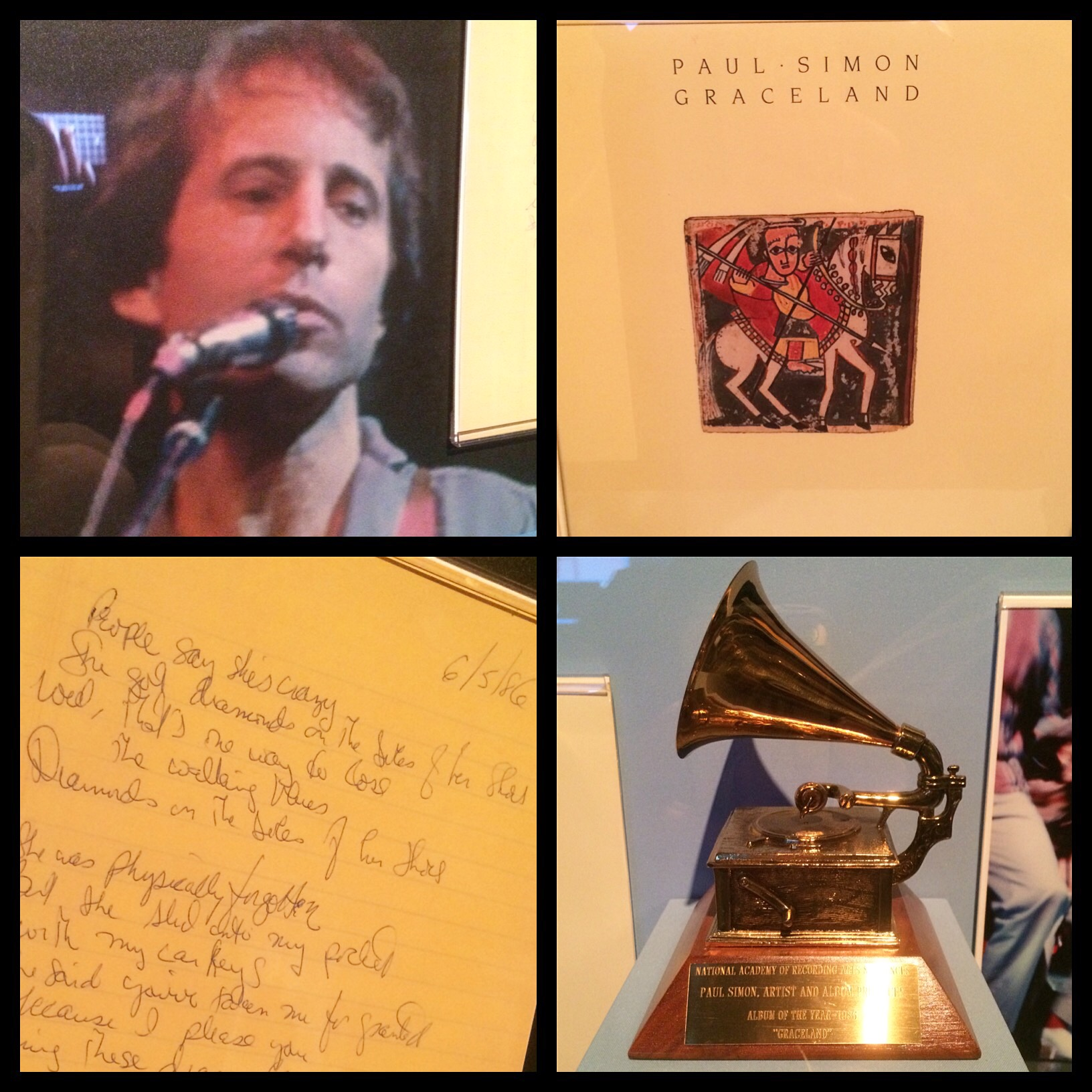
Paul Simon had released a Southern African music-influenced album after falling in love with this music.

On 29 June 1987, a meeting of interested parties gathered to capitalize on the marketing of non-Western folk music from. Paul Simon had released the world music-influenced album Graceland in 1986. The concept behind the album had been to express his own sensibilities using the sounds he had fallen in love with while listening to artists from Southern Africa, including Ladysmith Black Mambazo and Savuka. This project and the work of Peter Gabriel and Johnny Clegg among others had, to some degree, introduced non-Western music to a wider audience. They saw this as an opportunity.

Although specialist music stores had been important in developing the genre over many years, the record companies, broadcasters and journalists had been finding it difficult to build a following because the music, itself, seemed too scarce.

At the outset of the 1987 meeting, the musician Roger Armstrong advised the reason why something had to be done:

[He] felt that the main problem in selling our kind of material lay with the UK retail outlets and, specifically, the fact that they did not know how to rack it coherently. This discouraged [the retail stores] from stocking the material in any depth and made it more difficult for the record buyers to become acquainted with our catalogs.

The first concern of the meetings was to select the umbrella name that this music would be listed under. Suggestions included "world beat" and prefixing words such as "hot" or "tropical" to existing genre titles. "World music" won after a show of hands, but initially it was not meant to be the title for a whole new genre—just something the record labels could place on record sleeves to distinguish them during the forthcoming campaign. Afterward, they agreed that despite the publicity campaign, this was not an exclusive club—and that for the good of all, any label that sold this type of music could use the name.

Another issue was the distribution methods at the time. Most main labels were unhappy with the lack of specialist knowledge in their sales force, which led to poor service. Many larger outlets were reluctant to carry the music, because they favored larger releases they could promote within the store. It was difficult to justify a large presentation expense with limited stock going into stores.

== World music market ==
One of the marketing strategies used in the vinyl market at the time was the use of browser cards, which would appear in the record racks. As part of the "world music" campaign, it was decided that these would be a two color affair designed to carry a special offer package; to aid the retailer a selection of labels would also be included, presumably for shelf or rack edging.

In an unprecedented move, all of the world music labels coordinated together and developed a compilation cassette for the cover of the music magazine NME. The overall running time was 90 minutes, each package containing a mini-catalog showing the other releases on offer.

By the time of a second meeting it became clear that a campaign required its own dedicated press officer. The press officer would be able to juggle various deadlines and sell the music as a concept—not just to national stations, but also regional DJs keen to expand their musical variety. DJs were a key resource as it was important to make "world music" important to people outside London—most regions after all had a similarly heritage to tap into. A effective way of achieving all this would be a leafleting campaign.

The next step was to develop a world music chart, gathering together selling information from around fifty shops, so that it would finally be possible to see which were big sellers in the genre—so new listeners could see what was particularly popular. It was agreed that the NME could again be involved in printing the chart and also Music Week and the London listings magazine City Limits. It was also suggested that Andy Kershaw might be persuaded to do a run down of this chart on his show regularly.

== Criticism ==
The term "world music" (or "global", "international", and the like) is a Western musical category encompassing many different styles of music from other parts of the globe. It includes many forms of music that Westerners consider ethnic, indigenous music, folk music, neotraditional music, and music where more than one cultural tradition, such as non-Western music and Western popular music, intermingle.

World music is defined in opposition, and relative, to Western popular music and Western art music, and its constituent musics are positioned as equivalent to one another, despite the fact that they may have vastly different musical qualities. Therefore, the treatment of so-called world music is unequal to that of the normative music of the global West. This is primarily due to the fact that dominant corporate structures for music distribution and promotion in Europe and North America originate in those continents, as do their forums for establishing industry genre categories. Therefore, in market context, "ethnic" music is synthetically defined by a radius that extends from a Western center.

Some musicians and curators of music have come to dislike the term "world music". To these critics, "world music" is a parochial, catch-all marketing term for non-Western music of all genres. In October 1999, Luaka Bop label founder and ex-Talking Heads frontman David Byrne wrote an "I Hate World Music" editorial in The New York Times explaining his objections to the term. Byrne argued that the labelling and categorization of other cultures as "exotic" serves to attract an insincere consumption and deter other potential consumers.

== See also ==
- Music industry
