= F Gregory Holland =

- Born: August 29, 1958 (age 68); Chicago, Illinois
- Genres: Smooth jazz; Contemporary R&B; Rhythm and Blues
- Occupations: Composer; musician; producer
- Instruments: Acoustic guitar; Electric guitar
- Years active: 1980–present
- Website: Official Website

F Gregory Holland (born August 29, 1958) is an American composer, jazz guitarist musician, author, business executive, producer and publisher. As an artist, he has generally performed as a studio musician. Holland has arranged and produced numerous musical compositions. Some of his work is available for license usage. He has performed with a variety of musical ensembles and has been proactive in advocacy for music awareness, education and therapy.

== Early life ==
Holland was born in Chicago, Illinois on August 29, 1958, to Anna J. and Charles E. Holland. His parents were diligent workers. His father was a business entrepreneur and his mother was employed as a human resources professional. Holland's upbringing was immensely influenced by his parents, as well as his uncle, Lou Holland. His family raised him in an environment that significantly emphasized the arts, business, and humanities.

During his childhood, Holland attended a parochial school, which provided him with a religious framework. This spiritual grounding contributed to his values and educational stability. At the age of six he was introduced to the piano and later was instructed in learning to play the violin and trumpet. Through the support of his family, Holland quickly developed an appreciation for the arts and music. He was particularly intrigued by Black Gospel, Blues and Jazz. He began playing guitar at the age of 13, and purchased his first guitar, a Gibson SG when he was 16 years of age.

== Career ==
Since 1980, Holland has arranged, composed, and written numerous musical works. His contributions and involvement in the music industry have largely been working as a studio musician. Predominately facilitating instrumental compositions, Holland's work often includes amalgamating harmonic structures of blues, gospel, contemporary jazz, and rock disciplines.

Having an educational background in business administration and music theory, provided Holland with a balanced foundation. His life experiences contributed to the formation of a self-organized music label, licensing and publishing autonomous entity. Holland served on the Board of Trustees of the Wisconsin Conservatory of Music from 1996-2000. Milwaukee County Historical Society archives, collects and maintains information that documents the history of the Wisconsin Conservatory of Music.

Carrying on his endeavors with composing and writing, Holland proceeded with an emphasis on soloist material. This period included the mid-2010s, as well as early 2020s, building a structure without external control, which AllMusic described as a significant turning point in Holland's self-directed creative pursuits. On December 17, 2014, All About Jazz selected Holland's composition "Transcend", from his album Everything Will be Okay, as "Song of the Day " on All About Jazz.

Holland has been an active registered music publisher with the United States ISMN Agency Library of Congress Music Division since the 2020s. His published scores are listed in the international ISMN directory. Holland has published printed notation works under an assigned prefix issued by the International ISMN Agency, with ISMN identifiers registered via the International ISMN Agency.

Several of F Gregory Holland's scores, including After Love (2018), For Every Moment (2016), We Walk This Path Together (2015), and Life Lessons (2013), are published and listed in the International ISMN Agency database.

Holland's composition single "Day Break", released November 9, 2025 as well as his album Time of My Tomorrow , released in 2021, were both recognized by All About Jazz, receiving music coverage on April 5, 2026.

== Personal life ==
As of 2026, F Gregory Holland resides in Milwaukee, Wisconsin, where he currently operates his independent music label and publishing company. He is currently unmarried. F Gregory Holland is an entrepreneur, having funded his career efforts through work in the private sector within the financial industry.

== Discography ==
Year	Title

Singles

2025	"Day Break"	Label Independent/FGH Publishing	Non-album single

2025	"Moments of Memories"	Label Independent/FGH Publishing	Non-album single

2025	"We All Fall Short"	Label Independent/FGH Publishing	Non-album single

2023	"Steps of Faith"	Label Independent/FGH Publishing	Non-album single

2021	"Along Side The Lord"	Label Independent/FGH Publishing	Non-album single

2021	"Soul of Her Love"	Label Independent/FGH Publishing	Non-album single

Albums

2021	Time of My Tomorrow	Label Independent/FGH Publishing	Album

2020	Cooling Twiight	Label Independent/FGH Publishing	Album

2020	Make It Last	Label Independent/FGH Publishing	Album

2020	Together As One	Label Independent/FGH Publishing	Album

== Published Music Scores ==
- After Love,ISMN 979-0-3044-0002-6 Identifier Published March 11, 2018
- For Every Moment, ISMN 979-0-3044-0000-2 Identifier Published April 11, 2016
- We Walk This Path Together, ISMN 979-0-3044-0001-9 Identifier Published August 26, 2015
- Life Lessons, ISMN 979-0-3044-0003-3 Identifier Published November 8, 2013

== Books ==
Holland, F Gregory (2025). Finding Your Way. F Gregory Holland. ISBN 979-8-663-79639-2. LCCN 2025903603.
