= Issi Rozen =

Israeli-born jazz guitarist

Issi Rozen (Hebrew: ישי רוזן) is an Israeli-born jazz guitarist currently residing in Brookline, Massachusetts. He has been recognized for mixing traditional middle-eastern and straight jazz elements into his music. In 2002, Rozen began teaching guitar and music theory at Berklee College of Music.

== Early life ==
Issi Rozen was born in Haifa, Israel on April 20, 1967 and moved to Tel-Aviv during his childhood. As Rozen recalls in an All About Jazz interview, "my earliest musical memories are the lullabies my mother used to sing. They were mostly in minor keys as are most traditional Israeli songs." He began playing guitar at age 10, and as a teenager, Rozen was practicing several hours a day. In 1991, after completing his service in the Israeli Defense Forces, Rozen moved to Boston to study at Berklee College of Music.

== Musical career ==
After finishing his studies at Berklee, Rozen settled in the Boston suburb of Brookline. In 1998, he released his first album, Red Sea under Brownstone Records. A year later, Rozen released Homeland Blues under the same label, which was named one of the top 20 CDs by WBEZ radio in Chicago. In 2003 he released his third album titled Dark Beauty on his own label, New Step Music.

Clearly influenced by jazz guitarists Pat Metheny and Jim Hall, Rozen also uses musical components from his native Israel. The opening track on Dark Beauty, "Sheharhoret" (Dark Beauty in Hebrew) is a traditional Hebrew song sung primarily by Mizrahi Jews. On the same album, Rozen cover's an obscure Charlie Parker tune, "Segment". This hybrid of different genres has given Rozen critical acclaim. The other eight tracks on the album are Rozen's own pieces.

== Awards and honors ==
- 1999 Boston Best Jazz Performer
- 2000 WBEZ Radio Top 20 CDs in 2000 ("Homeland Blues")

== Discography ==
- Red Sea (Brownstone, 1998)
- Homeland Blues (Brownstone, 1999)
- Dark Beauty (Artist One Stop, 2003)
