= Bruce Arnold (jazz) =

American jazz guitarist, composer, educator, and author

- Born: July 31, 1955 (age 70); Sioux Falls, South Dakota, U.S.
- Genres: Jazz, classical
- Instrument: Guitar
- Years active: 1980s–present
- Label: Muse-eek
- Formerly of: Spooky Actions
- Website: brucearnold.com

Bruce Arnold (born July 31, 1955) is an American jazz guitarist, composer, educator, and author.

== Early life and education ==
Born and raised in Sioux Falls, South Dakota, Arnold took accordion lessons and discovered guitar when he saw the Beatles perform on The Ed Sullivan Show. He attended the University of South Dakota but switched to the Berklee College of Music in 1976. He took private lessons from Jerry Bergonzi and Charlie Banacos.

== Career ==
Arnold moved to New York City in 1988 where he became an active member of the jazz community, producing many recordings as a sideman and leader. He is one of the few electric guitarists in the world to use the computer program SuperCollider in both his compositions and improvisations. Arnold is a founding member of Spooky Actions, a jazz group which explores improvisation using classical music repertoire.

He has played with Stuart Hamm, Peter Erskine, Joe Pass, Joe Lovano, Lenny Pickett, Randy Brecker, Stanley Clarke, the Boston Symphony Orchestra, and the Absolute Ensemble under the baton of Kristjan Järvi.

Arnold's recording credits include over twenty albums and DVDs (on Muse-eek Records, Mel Bay Recordings, Truefire and other labels), ranging from standard jazz repertoire to free improvisation to reinterpretations of classical music.

=== Teaching and writing ===
He is the director of Guitar Studies at New York University and Princeton University as well as the creator of the New York University Summer Guitar Intensive. He has taught at the New England Conservatory, Dartmouth College, Berklee, New School University, and City College of New York.

Arnold's theoretical works have explored the use of pitch class set theory within an improvisational setting. He has also written more than 60 music instruction books covering guitar pedagogy, ear training, and time studies.

== Discography ==
=== As leader ===
- Act of Finding (OODiscs, 1995)
- Blue Eleven (MMC, 1996)
- Havana Manana (Bembe, 1999)
- Give 'em Some (Muse Eek, 2002)
- Two Guys from South Dakota (Muse Eek, 2004)
- Duets with Olivier Ker Ourio (Muse Eek, 2004)
- Disklaimer with Tom Hamilton (Muse Eek, 2005)
- Intersections (Muse Eek, 2005)
- String Theory (Muse Eek, 2005)
- Aspiration with Dusan Bogdanovic (Muse Eek, 2007)
- Blue Lotus (Muse Eek, 2007)
- Art of the Blues (Muse Eek, 2010)
- Invocation with Gilbert Isbin (Muse Eek, 2010)
- Heavy Mental (Muse Eek, 2010)
- Multiplicity (Muse Eek, 2010)
- Sonic Infestation with John Stowell (Muse Eek, 2011)
- Dakota Gumbo with Mike Miller (Muse Eek, 2011)
- Secret Code with Jane Getter (Muse Eek, 2011)
- Vanishing Point (Muse Eek 2019)
- Heard Instinct with Kenny Wessel (Muse Eek 2021)
- Gemini (2014) (with Barry Wedgle)

With Spooky Actions

- Music of Webern (Muse Eek, 2003)
- Early Music (Muse Eek, 2004)
- Songs of the Nations (Orchard, 2004)
- Quartet for the End of Time with Olivier Messiaen (Muse Eek, 2005)
- Schoenberg (Muse Eek, 2007)

With Sonic Twist

- Listen to This with Judi Silvano (Muse Eek, 2014)
- Cloud Walking with Judi Silvano (Muse Eek, 2017)
- Unity with Judi Silvano (Muse Eek, 2020)
