= Tom Hamilton (electronic musician) =

American electronic musician

Thomas Hamilton is an American pop/electro/rock musician in Los Angeles, California. He performs under the stage name Hamilton.

== Early life and career ==
Hamilton grew up in Orange County, California, and moved to Los Angeles as a teen.

Thomas got his first break in commercial music when two of his songs debuted on television. The MTV television series Laguna Beach: The Real Orange County used his track Alive. The E! Entertainment Television series Paradise City also used one of Hamilton's songs. He initially signed a development deal with J Records, but the label did not release any of his music.

Hamilton is signed to the Indie Pop Records label, based in Los Angeles. His contemporaries on the label include Dev, Marty James, Bobby Brackins, The Cataracs, and Yuna. Hamilton recently released an EP produced by The Cataracs, after their collaboration on the Billboard Hot 100 #1 hit Like a G6. His previous collaborations with The Cataracs included Mr. Sexual and God Knows.

Hamilton has worked with Swedish producer Alex Kronlund, who wrote for and produced Robin and Britney Spears. He continues to write and record with Indie Pop and has recently joined forces musically with Caroline D'Amore, the actress and model. Hamilton is currently writing new music with producer-songwriter Freddy Wexler.

== Music ==
In an interview with Rick Florino, Hamilton described his music as "a fusion of hip hop and pop. We write everything on guitar, but we use a lot of hip hop beats. In the end, every element comes together seamlessly."

He also explained to Florino the story behind his song Sun, calling it "a real exploration of emotion but not in the self-help way. Dark and the light exist in the same place. People wait for that one big moment or that one thing they believe will solve all of their problems and cause happiness—whether it's a record deal or graduating college. It's seems like the waiting never ends though. You're waiting for the sun to shine essentially, and that's what the song is about. Darkness comes and goes, but the sun will always be back. Things may be shitty, but they'll get better."

== Reception and media appearances ==
Hamilton has recommended by some of the industry's hottest bloggers, including A&R leader Crazed Hits and Arjan Writes. Arjan Writes recommended the song Sun, calling it "a sweeping electro-pop stomper that is a good introduction to Hamilton's peppy, genre-mashing brand of pop."

The music video for Sun won Best Freshman Video in 2010 on MTVU, thus launching Hamilton's music video to all major outlets, including MTV2, Fuse, and Logo's New Now Next.

In July 2010, Hamilton appeared on the Gary and Catherine morning radio show on Santa Barbara, California's 101.7 KLITE FM.

Hamilton also attended the 2011 South by Southwest Music Festival in Austin, Texas. There he was interviewed by Arjan of Arjan Writes for an episode of the music interview web series Cherrytree Pop Chop Minute.
