= Gustavo Assis-Brasil =

Brazilian-American guitarist

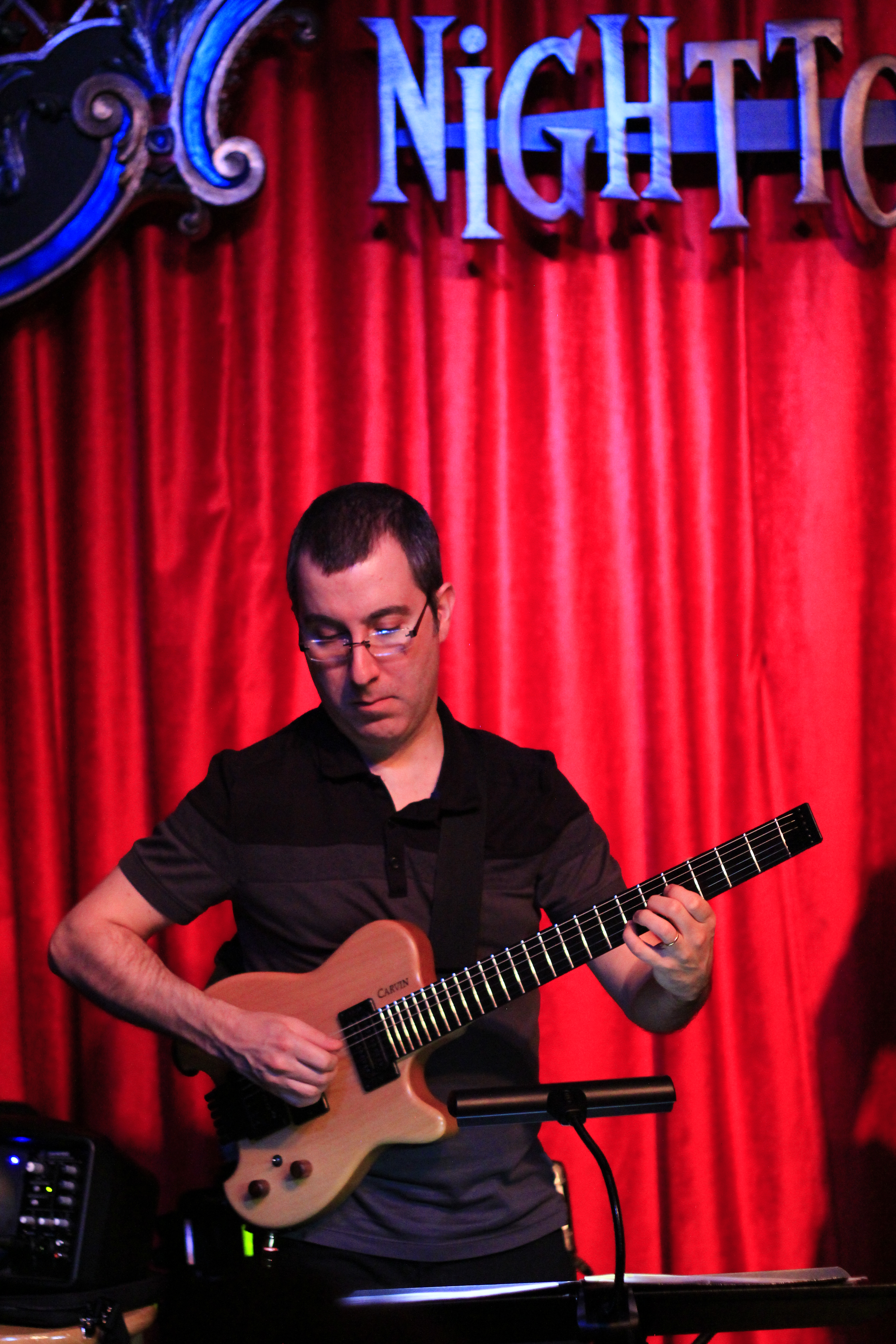
- Gustavo Assis-Brasil in Cleveland, Ohio, 2014, photo by Mara Rubin

Background information
- Genres: Jazz, Brazilian, jazz fusion, instrumental rock
- Occupations: Musician, composer, teacher
- Instrument: Guitar
- Years active: 1991–present
- Member of: Dig Trio, Mozik
- Website: gustavoassisbrasil.com

Gustavo Assis-Brasil is a Brazilian-American guitarist. He is considered a pioneer in the study and development of the hybrid picking technique for guitar. In 2005, he released the book Hybrid Picking for Guitar.

== Career ==
In 1999 he received a scholarship to get his Master's degree at Berklee College of Music and The Boston Conservatory. His teachers included David Fiuczynski, Mick Goodrick, and Wayne Krantz. He studied improvisation and composition with Charlie Banacos and Prasanna. He took master classes and lessons with Frank Gambale, David Liebman, Pat Metheny, Mike Stern, and John Scofield.

From 2001 until 2006, Assis-Brasil played and toured with the Dig Trio.

In 2005, Assis-Brasil released the book Hybrid Picking for Guitar about combining the pick and fingers to play the guitar.

In 2008, he released the follow-up book, Hybrid Picking Exercises: Single Note Permutations, with more than 1,400 different exercises based entirely on math permutations. Also in 2008, Assis-Brasil released a live DVD/CD combo called In Concert, which features his original compositions. In the same year, he was invited by ESC Records in Germany to write and record an arrangement of Steely Dan's "Aja" as part of the tribute album Maestros of Cool.

In 2009, Assis-Brasil was invited to participate in the album Mahavishnu Re-Defined – A Tribute to John McLaughlin and the Mahavishnu Orchestra.

In 2010 he composed music for the soundtrack to the Brazilian movie Manhã Transfigurada.

In 2011, Assis-Brasil released his third book, Hybrid Picking Lines and Licks. British guitarist Guthrie Govan wrote the foreword.

In 2017, his song "Gee," from his album Chromatic Dialogues, won the Instrumental category for the 2016 International Songwriting Competition (ISC).

In 2019, Gustavo released his fourth book, “Advanced Hybrid Picking Etudes Vol.1”. This book has received praise by musicians like Plini, Per Nilsson (Meshuggah), Vardan Ovsepian, among others.

He has performed and recorded with Richard Bona, Nelson Faria, Tony Grey, Bob Mintzer, Mozik, Tim Ries, Esperanza Spalding, John Stowell, Mauricio Zottarelli, Evan Marien, and Hiromi Uehara.

He is the director of the jazz and Contemporary Music Ensembles of The Cambridge School of Weston, and he taught at Berklee College of Music during the guitar sessions. Assis-Brasil taught clinics at the Guitar Institute of Technology in Los Angeles, California; University of Southern California; Berklee College of Music, Boston, Massachusetts; UFRGS, Brazil; Federal University of Santa Maria, Brazil; University of Passo Fundo, Brazil, and Uppsala Guitar Festival, Sweden.

== Discography ==
- Bichofolha with Guilherme Barros (Nezara, 1996)
- In Concert (2008)
- Manha Transfigurada (2010)
- Chromatic Dialogues (2016)

With Dig Trio

- Dig Trio (2003)

With Mozik

- Mozik (2011)

== Bibliography ==
- Assis-Brasil, Gustavo (2005). Hybrid Picking for Guitar. Gustavo Assis-Brasil Music. ISBN 0-9774398-0-1.
- Assis-Brasil, Gustavo (2008). Hybrid Picking Exercises: Single Note Permutations. Create Space. ISBN 978-1-4528-9543-7.
- Assis-Brasil, Gustavo (2011). Hybrid Picking Lines and Licks for Guitar. Gustavo Assis-Brasil Music. ISBN 978-1-4507-8128-2.
- Assis-Brasil, Gustavo (2019). Advanced Hybrid Picking Etudes for Guitar Volume 1. Gustavo Assis-Brasil Music. ISBN 978-1-0901-2008-3.
- Assis-Brasil, Gustavo (2020). Advanced Hybrid Picking Etudes for Guitar Volume 2. Gustavo Assis-Brasil Music. ISBN 979-8-6778-9032-1.
