= Jean Chaumont =

French jazz guitarist and composer

- Born: 16 June 1983 (age 43); Saint-Cloud, France
- Genres: Jazz
- Occupations: Musician, composer
- Instrument: Guitar
- Labels: Misfitme Music, Re:Jazz
- Website: www.jeanchaumont.com

Jean Chaumont (born 16 June 1983) is a French jazz guitarist and composer.

== Career ==
Chaumont started playing guitar at fourteen years old, after eight years of piano training. Two years later, he began formally studying jazz music.

He received a degree in jazz musical studies from the Conservatory of Orsay in 2004, later rounding out this academic training by playing extensively in France with musicians such as Fiona Monbet, Ibrahim Maalouf, Armel Dupas, and Karl Jannuska in venues such as Festival Jazz à Saint-Germain-des-Prés, Charlie Jazz Festival, Salle Pleyel, and Sunset/Sunside. Alongside his performance work, Chaumont was commissioned for various compositions and arrangements including the scoring of "Le Bonheur en Suspens," a full-length French documentary for France 3.

Chaumont moved to Princeton, New Jersey in 2014. He began composing for his debut album, The Beauty of Differences, which was released on 15 June 2018. It received critical acclaim including a four-star review from Down Beat magazine and remained in the top 100 in jazz radio airplay for ten weeks in the United States, according to JazzWeek. The Beauty of Differences features a core band with bassist Ike Sturm, saxophonist Sam Sadigursky, pianist Michael Bond, and drummer Rudy Royston as well as Tierney Sutton, Vinod Gnanaraj, John Hadfield, and Enoch Smith Jr. as guests. Its proceeds will finance the excavation of wells in the Sakata region of Malawi, Africa through the Villages in Partnership organization.

Chaumont has also played in U.S. with Orlando le Fleming, Dan Tepfer, Rogerio Boccato, Jon Irabagon, and Reggie Quinerly venues such as Subculture and St. Peter's Church in New York City.

== Discography ==
=== As leader ===
- 2018: The Beauty of Differences

=== Collaborations ===
With Goud

- 2010: Glucose

With Giuseppe de Gregorio

- 2012: Firstep
