= Ronnie Singer =

American jazz guitarist (1928–1953)

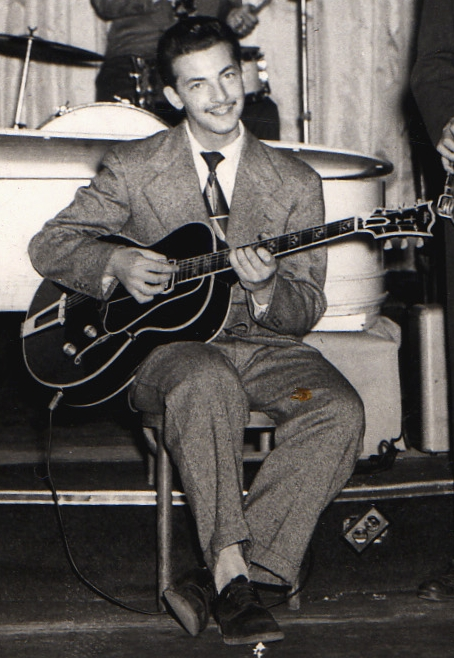

Background information
- Born: June 9, 1928; Chicago, Illinois, U.S.
- Died: September 12, 1953 (aged 25) New York City
- Genre: Jazz
- Occupation: Musician
- Instrument: Guitar
- Years active: 1940s–1953

Ronnie Singer (June 9, 1928 – September 12, 1953) was an American jazz guitarist from Chicago. Singer was influential on other jazz musicians, and was considered "just as good as Jimmy Raney", according to Jimmy Gourley who played with both guitarists in Chicago. He was heavily addicted to heroin. At the age of 25, he and his wife committed suicide together in a hotel room in New York City.
