= List of festivals and fairs in the San Francisco Bay Area =

This is a list of festivals and fairs in the San Francisco Bay Area, both ongoing and defunct.

== By type ==
=== Film ===
- American Indian Film Festival
- Arab Film Festival
- Berlin & Beyond Film Festival
- Cinequest Film Festival
- Disposable Film Festival
- Frameline Film Festival
- Hi/Lo Film Festival
- International Black Women's Film Festival
- Mill Valley Film Festival
- Palo Alto International Film Festival
- San Francisco Frozen Film Festival
- San Francisco Green Film Festival
- San Francisco International Asian American Film Festival
- San Francisco International Film Festival
- San Francisco International Lesbian and Gay Film Festival
- San Francisco Jewish Film Festival
- San Francisco Ocean Film Festival
- San Francisco Silent Film Festival
- Sonoma International Film Festival (AKA Sonoma Valley Film Festival)
- Superfest International Disability Film Festival
- Temescal Street Cinema
- Third World Independent Film Festival

=== Cultural and folk ===
- Asian Heritage Street Celebration

=== Theater and arts ===
- Bay Area Circus Arts Festival

=== Music ===
- Bay Area Indie Music Festival - Martinez, California
- Bay Area Rock Fest
- Bear Valley Music Festival
- Cotati Jazz Festival - Cotati, California
- Day on the Green
- Hardly Strictly Bluegrass
- Harmony Sweepstakes A Cappella Festival
- Fantasy Fair and Magic Mountain Music Festival
- Loveparade
- Music at Tateuchi
- Treasure Island Music Festival
- Vans Warped Tour

=== General and other ===
- Bay Area Book Festival
- Bay Area Maker Faire
- Bay to Breakers
- Berkeley Jazz Festival
- BottleRock Napa Valley
- Burning Man
- Caltopia
- Carnaval San Francisco
- Castro Street Fair
- Eat Real Festival
- Exotic Erotic Ball
- Festival del Sole
- Fiesta on the Hill - Bernal Heights, San Francisco
- Fillmore Jazz Festival
- Ghirardelli Chocolate Festival - September
- Gilroy Community Festival - Gilroy, California
- Gilroy Garlic Festival - Gilroy, California
- Green Festival
- Haight-Ashbury Street Fair
- Halloween in the Castro
- How Weird Street Faire
- KFOG KaBoom
- Lafayette Art & Wine Festival
- Litquake
- Maker Faire
- Midsummer Mozart Festival
- Mission Creek Music and Arts Festival
- Mushroom Mardi Gras Festival
- Napa Valley Festival del Sole
- Noise Pop Festival
- Northern California Folk-Rock Festival (1968)
- Northern California Folk-Rock Festival (1969)
- Opera in the Park hosted by San Francisco Opera
- Other Minds Music Festival
- Outside Lands Music and Arts Festival
- Oyster Festival
- PeaceOUT World Homo Hop Festival - Oakland, California
- Pink Saturday
- The Renegade Craft Fair in San Francisco
- Russell City Blues Festival
- San Francisco Blues Festival
- San Francisco Chinese New Year Festival and Parade
- San Francisco Jazz Festival
- San Francisco LovEvolution
- San Francisco Juneteenth Festival
- San Francisco Marathon
- San Francisco Pop Festival
- San Francisco Pride
- San Jose Holiday Parade
- San Jose Jazz Festival
- SF Sketchfest - San Francisco comedy sketch festival
- Sierra Nevada World Music Festival
- Slow Food Nation
- Solano Avenue Stroll
- Soundwave Festival
- Stanford Jazz Workshop
- Stern Grove Festival in San Francisco
- Wonderfest - San Francisco Bay Area festival of science

=== LGBT ===
- Folsom Street Fair
- Gay Pride Parade and Festival
- San Francisco International Lesbian and Gay Film Festival
