= Bak-Anime =

Anime convention in Bakersfield, California

Coordinates: 35°20′35″N 119°0′27″W

- Status: Active
- Genre: Anime, Manga, Video Games
- Venue: Kern County Fairgrounds
- Location: Bakersfield, California
- Country: United States
- Inaugurated: 2010
- Website: http://www.bak-anime.com/

Bak-Anime is an annual two-day anime convention held during May/June at the Kern County Fairgrounds in Bakersfield, California by the staff of SacAnime. The convention is the sister conventions to the Bakersfield Comic Con, Sacramento Comic, Toy and Anime Show (Sac-Con), and SacAnime.

== Programming ==
The convention typically offers an artists' alley, card game tournaments, cosplay contest, dealer's room, and a swap meet.

== History ==
The convention began due to the requests of fans from the Bakersfield Comic Con. Bak-Anime in winter 2013 moved to the Bakersfield Marriott due to growth and for the fall 2013 event expanded to two days. The expansion in the fall was considered a risk due to the increased costs of events run at that time of the year. The convention returned to one day in June 2014, and re-expanded to two days in January 2015. The 2019 event occupied two of the Kern County Fairgrounds buildings. Bak-Anime 2020 was cancelled due to the COVID-19 pandemic. Bak-Anime 2021 was also cancelled due to the COVID-19 pandemic.

=== Event history ===
Dates	Location	Atten.	Guests
May 2, 2010	Doubletree Hotel Bakersfield; Bakersfield, California		Katie Bair and Liam O'Brien.
January 23, 2011	Doubletree Hotel Bakersfield; Bakersfield, California		Stephanie Lesniak, Billy Martinez, and Vic Mignogna.
April 22, 2012	Doubletree Hotel Bakersfield; Bakersfield, California	1,100	Laura Bailey, Billy Martinez, and Travis Willingham.
January 20, 2013	Bakersfield Marriott at the Convention Center; Bakersfield, California	1,400 (est)	Ivy Doomkitty, Billy Martinez, Roger Craig Smith, and Nate Watson.
November 2–3, 2013	Bakersfield Marriott at the Convention Center; Bakersfield, California		Akai SKY, Jennifer Hale, Liam O'Brien, and Sam Riegel.
June 22, 2014	Bakersfield Marriott at the Convention Center; Bakersfield, California		Trina Nishimura and Brina Palencia.
January 24–25, 2015	Bakersfield Marriott at the Convention Center; Bakersfield, California	around 1,400 (est)	Christine Marie Cabanos, Kyle Hebert, and Cristina Vee.
February 6–7, 2016	Bakersfield Marriott at the Convention Center; Bakersfield, California		Johnny Yong Bosch, Eyeshine, Tony Fleecs, Ali Hillis, and Kyle Hebert, Roger Jackson.
February 25–26, 2017	Kern County Fairgrounds; Bakersfield, California	around 3,500 (est)	Karan Ashley, Walter E. Jones, Cherami Leigh Danielle McRae, Vic Mignogna, and David Yost.
February 3–4, 2018	Kern County Fairgrounds; Bakersfield, California		Feodor Chin, Liam O'Brien, Josh Petersdorf, and David Yost.
February 2–3, 2019	Kern County Fairgrounds; Bakersfield, California		Kellen Goff, Kenny James, Neil Kaplan, Vic Mignogna, and Tara Sands.
May 21–22, 2022	Kern County Fairgrounds; Bakersfield, California		Mela Lee, Vic Mignogna, Sarah Natochenny, Alicyn Packard, Nate Watson, Ezra Weisz, Joe Zieja, and James Mathis III.
May 20–21, 2023	Kern County Fairgrounds; Bakersfield, California		Laila Berzins, Brook Chalmers, Ian James Corlett, Tony Fleecs, Josey McCoy, Patrick Pedraza, and Dina Sherman.
June 1–2, 2024	Kern County Fairgrounds; Bakersfield, California		A.J. Beckles, Griffin Burns, Sean Chiplock, Doug Erholtz, Chris Hackney, Anairis Quiñones, Christopher Corey Smith, Karen Strassman, and Dan Woren.
May 31 – June 1, 2025	Kern County Fairgrounds; Bakersfield, California		JB Blanc, Catero Colbert, Dorothy Fahn, Tom Fahn, Mara Junot, Anjali Kunapaneni, Erica Luttrell, Kayleigh McKee, Jonah Scott, Nate Watson, Natasha Craig, and Scott Joseph.
May 30–31, 2026	Kern County Fairgrounds; Bakersfield, California		Ryan Bartley, Ivy Doomkitty, Ryan Drummond, Richard Epcar, Rick Farmiloe, Landon McDonald, Celeste Perez, Jamieson Price, Scott Shaw!, Dina Sherman, Paul St. Peter, Benjamin Stegmair, Veronica Taylor, Nate Watson, Henry Dittman, Peter Lurie, and Ben Stegmair.
