= SacAnime =

Anime fan convention in the United States

Coordinates: 38°34′41.92″N 121°29′18.68″W

- Status: Active
- Genre: Anime, Manga, Japanese culture
- Venue: SAFE Credit Union Convention Center; Memorial Auditorium
- Location: Sacramento, California
- Country: United States
- Inaugurated: 2004
- Attendance: 21,000 in Summer 2018
- Filing status: Sole proprietorship
- Website: sacanime.com

SacAnime is a tri-annual three-day anime convention held at the SAFE Credit Union Convention Center and Memorial Auditorium in Sacramento, California. The convention's sister events include the Sacramento Comic, Toy and Anime Show (Sac-Con) and Bak-Anime.

== Programming ==
SacAnime typically features an animated music video contest, art contests, artists alley, card-game tournaments, console gaming, cosplay chess, costume contests, dealers room, fashion show, karaoke, maid cafe, masquerade, music performances, panels, Q&A sessions, rave, swap meet, video games, and workshops.

== History ==
SacAnime began as an extension of the quarterly Sacramento Comic, Toy and Anime Show (Sac-Con). The convention was originally known as the Sacramento Anime & Manga Show and became a semi-annual event in 2005. Due to the summer convention's growth, it moved to the Sacramento Convention Center in 2013. The Winter 2013 show was also moved to the Sacramento Convention Center. The Summer 2013 event shared the Sacramento Convention Center with the Sacramento Greek Festival, and with the convention badge attendees could enter festival for free. The convention expanded into additional space in the Sacramento Convention Center, along with holding some events in the Sheraton Grand Sacramento Hotel. The Winter 2014 convention continued to utilize space in the Sheraton Grand. A marriage proposal occurred during the costume contest. Sac-Anime Winter 2016 was the first year they used all exhibit halls at the Sacramento Convention Center. Prop guns were banned at the Summer 2017 convention. SacAnime Summer in 2019 will be moving from September to June.

SacAnime in 2020 moved to Cal Expo due to renovations occurring at the Sacramento Convention Center. SacAnime Summer 2020 was cancelled due to the COVID-19 pandemic. SacAnime Winter 2021 was cancelled due to the COVID-19 pandemic and the Sacramento Convention Center not being available. The convention returned to the SAFE Credit Union Convention Center in September 2021, after the venue received $180 million in renovations. They also had a mask mandate. The January 2022 event had COVID-19 protocols and on-site testing. Due to SacAnime Roseville's growth, for 2026 it moved to Cal Expo and returned to the name SacAnime Spring. Several events were held in the venues outdoor tent. Martin O'Donnell was to be a guest at SacAnime Summer 2026, but the convention withdrew its invitation due to political statements he made. SacAnime has joined a growing number of anime conventions in banning wearable recording devices after feedback from guests and vendors.

=== Event history ===
Dates	Location	Atten.	Guests
July 31 – August 1, 2004	Sunrise Mall; Citrus Heights, California		Kyle Hoyt, Ben Seto, and Andrew Wong.
February 12, 2005	Scottish Rite Center; Sacramento, California	1,000 (est)	
July 30–31, 2005	Sunrise Mall; Citrus Heights, California		Katie Bair, Ron Lim, Steve Oliff, and Ben Seto.
January 14, 2006	Scottish Rite Center; Sacramento, California		
July 15, 2006	Scottish Rite Center; Sacramento, California	2,000 (est)	Akai SKY, Artbeat, Katie Bair, Jodon Bellofatto, Neil Kaplan, Ron Lim, Austin Osueke, Trina Robbins, and David Stanworth.
January 13–14, 2007	Scottish Rite Center; Sacramento, California		Artbeat, Katie Bair, Jodon Bellofatto, Che Gilson, Ron Lim, Yoko Molotov, Austin Osueke, Spike Spencer, Amanda Tomasch, and {mid:night}.
July 13–15, 2007	Red Lion Hotel Sacramento; Sacramento, California		Akai SKY, Artbeat, Katie Bair, Crispin Freeman, Lisa Furukawa, Chris Hazelton, Yishan Li, Brandon McKinney, Yoko Molotov, Chris Patton, PLID, Rusika, Patrick Seitz, Spike Spencer, Amanda Tomasch, Aurelio Voltaire, Brent Wooley, and {mid:night}.
January 11–13, 2008	Scottish Rite Center; Sacramento, California		Laura Bailey, Darrel Guilbeau, Metal Phyzix, Vic Mignogna, Ben Roman, The Slants, and Travis Willingham.
August 29–31, 2008	Scottish Rite Center; Sacramento, California		Katie Bair, Jodon Bellofatto, Crispin Freeman, Che Gilson, Neil Kaplan, Liam O'Brien, Sam Riegel, and Spike Spencer.
January 9–11, 2009	Scottish Rite Center; Sacramento, California		Akai SKY, Laura Bailey, Katie Bair, Jodon Bellofatto, Lisa Furukawa, Tom Kane, Vic Mignogna, Ben Roman, Chris Sarandon, Travis Willingham, and {mid:night}.
August 28–30, 2009	Radisson Hotel; Sacramento, California		Katie Bair, Jodon Bellofatto, Alyson Court, Che Gilson, Brandon McKinney, Paul Mercier, Liam O'Brien, August Ragone, Roger Craig Smith, and Tanuki Suit Riot.
January 8–10, 2010	Radisson Hotel; Sacramento, California		Laura Bailey, Katie Bair, Jodon Bellofatto, Brandon McKinney, Vic Mignogna, Chris Sarandon, The Slants, and Travis Willingham.
September 3–5, 2010	Radisson Hotel; Sacramento, California		Katie Bair, Jodon Bellofatto, Steve Blum, Rebecca Forstadt, Ali Hillis, Mari Iijima, Billy Martinez, Liam O'Brien, Phoenix Ash, and Steve Yun.
January 7–9, 2011	Radisson Hotel; Sacramento, California		Karan Ashley, Johnny Yong Bosch, Steve Cardenas, Karen Dyer, Yaya Han, Walter E. Jones, Kairu, Ken Lally, Roger Craig Smith, Sonny Strait, and Catherine Sutherland.
September 2–4, 2011	Radisson Hotel; Sacramento, California	4,800	Akai SKY, Johnny Yong Bosch, James C. Burns, Eyeshine, Yuri Lowenthal, Billy Martinez, Liam O'Brien, Tara Platt, Sam Riegel, and The Slants.
January 13–15, 2012	Woodlake Hotel (Formerly Radisson); Sacramento, California	5000+ (est)	Troy Baker, Quinton Flynn, Ali Hillis, Kazha, Vic Mignogna, Tara Strong, and Mark Tatulli.
August 31-September 2, 2012	Woodlake Hotel; Sacramento, California	7,000	Akai SKY, Laura Bailey, Johnny Yong Bosch, Eyeshine, Jennifer Hale, Billy Martinez, Michelle Ruff, Roger Craig Smith, Team LoveHate, and Travis Willingham.
January 4–6, 2013	Sacramento Convention Center; Sacramento, California		Mai Aizawa, Kevin Conroy, Grey DeLisle, Maile Flanagan, Toshio Furukawa, Todd Haberkorn, Kyle Hebert, Kazha, Cyril Lumboy, Tsuyoshi Nonaka, Liam O'Brien, Tony Oliver, Raj Ramayya, and Hynden Walch.
August 30-September 1, 2013	Sacramento Convention Center; Sacramento, California	9,000 (est)	Akai SKY, Troy Baker, Johnny Yong Bosch, Hector David, Jr., Najee De-Tiege, Eyeshine, Alex Heartman, Ashley Johnson, Cherami Leigh, Charles Martinet, Billy Martinez, Tsuyoshi Nonaka, Nolan North, Bryce Papenbrook, Raj Ramayya, Sumi Shimamoto, J. Michael Tatum, and Dan Woren.
January 3–5, 2014	Sacramento Convention Center; Sacramento, California	10,132	Dante Basco, Steve Blum, Ashly Burch, Svetlana Chmakova, Steve Downes, Kazha, Charles Martinet, Kenta Maruyama, Adam May, Vic Mignogna, Nylon Pink, Tony Oliver, Brina Palencia, Raj Ramayya, Jeremy Shada, Jen Taylor, Bruce Thomas, and Janet Varney.
August 29–31, 2014	Sacramento Convention Center; Sacramento, California		Johnny Yong Bosch, Rodger Bumpass, Christine Marie Cabanos, Eyeshine, Jason Faunt, Jessie James Grelle, Adrian Hough, Melissa Hutchison, Yuri Lowenthal, Billy Martinez, Brandon Jay McLaren, Danielle McRae, Liam O'Brien, Tony Oliver, Tara Platt, Sam Riegel, Mark Sheppard, The Slants, Roger Craig Smith, Gregory Snegoff, J. Michael Tatum, Cristina Vee, Noah Watts, and Steve Yun.
January 2–4, 2015	Sacramento Convention Center; Sacramento, California		Bennett Abara, Linda Ballantyne, Ashly Burch, Dameon Clarke, Peter Cullen, John DiMaggio, Richard Epcar, Tony Fleecs, Caitlin Glass, Barbara Goodson, Chris Gore, Katie Griffin, Todd Haberkorn, Yaya Han, Kyle Hebert, Lauren Landa, Toshio Maeda, Charles Martinet, Adam May, Erica Mendez, Matthew Mercer, Cassandra Lee Morris, Trina Nishimura, Brina Palencia, Bryce Papenbrook, Toby Proctor, Revolution Boi, Susan Roman, Ellyn Stern, David Vincent, Lisle Wilkerson, and Mamoru Yokota.
September 4–6, 2015	Sacramento Convention Center; Sacramento, California	17,000 (est)	Zach Aguilar, Karan Ashley, Laura Bailey, Johnny Yong Bosch, Jim Cummings, John DiMaggio, Steve Downes, Eyeshine, David Faustino, David J. Fielding, Seychelle Gabriel, Erika Harlacher, Walter E. Jones, Maurice LaMarche, Erica Lindbeck, Toshio Maeda, Liam O'Brien, Austin St. John, Jen Taylor, Lauren Tom, Janet Varney, Hynden Walch, Billy West, Travis Willingham, and Wally Wingert.
January 1–3, 2016	Sacramento Convention Center; Sheraton Grand Hotel; Sacramento, California	12,000 (est)	Irene Bedard, Ashly Burch, Zach Callison, Steve Cardenas, Dameon Clarke, Kevin Eastman, David Eddings, Crispin Freeman, Todd Haberkorn, Doug Jones, Lauren Landa, Cherami Leigh, Toshio Maeda, Charles Martinet, David Matranga, Adam May, Trina Nishimura, Chris Sarandon, and Veronica Taylor.
September 2–4, 2016	Sacramento Convention Center; Sacramento Memorial Auditorium; Sacramento, California		Laura Bailey, Dante Basco, Steve Blum, Nakia Burrise, John DiMaggio, Courtnee Draper, Blake Anthony Foster, Linda Larkin, Wendee Lee, Toshio Maeda, Mary Elizabeth McGlynn, Liam O'Brien, Brina Palencia, Sam Riegel, Hilary Shepard, Roger Craig Smith, Catherine Sutherland, J. Michael Tatum, Roger Velasco, Selwyn Jaydon Ward, and Travis Willingham.
January 6–8, 2017	Sacramento Convention Center; Sacramento, California		Karan Ashley, Ashly Burch, Dameon Clarke, Dancing Dolls, David Eddings, Kellen Goff, Walter E. Jones, Cherami Leigh, Charles Martinet, Adam May, Vic Mignogna, Cassandra Lee Morris, Nolan North, Paige O'Hara, Bryce Papenbrook, Khary Payton, Michelle Ruff, Austin St. John, J. Michael Tatum, David Vincent, and David Yost.
September 1–3, 2017	Sacramento Convention Center; Sacramento, California		Kira Buckland, Zach Callison, Ali Hillis, Toshio Maeda, Elizabeth Maxwell, Kristian Nairn, Trina Nishimura, Liam O'Brien, Brina Palencia, Adrian Paul, John Ratzenberger, Sam Riegel, Bill Rogers, Roger Craig Smith, Gaku Space, J. Michael Tatum, Courtenay Taylor, and Hynden Walch.
January 5–7, 2018	Sacramento Convention Center; Sheraton Grand Sacramento; Sacramento, California	17,000 (est)	Bryn Apprill, Laura Bailey, Anjali Bhimani, Steve Cardenas, Feodor Chin, Dameon Clarke, Grey DeLisle, Barbara Dunkelman, Kara Eberle, Crispin Freeman, Todd Haberkorn, Lindsay Jones, Ralph Lister, Charles Martinet, Elizabeth Maxwell, Vic Mignogna, Paul Nakauchi, Alan Oppenheimer, Chris Parson, Josh Petersdorf, Keith Silverstein, Travis Willingham, Arryn Zech, and Elise Zhang.
August 31-September 2, 2018	Sacramento Convention Center; Sheraton Grand Sacramento; Sacramento, California	21,000 (est)	Tony Anselmo, Morgan Berry, Jen Brown, Greg Bryk, Michael Chu, Jason Douglas, Richard Epcar, Quinton Flynn, Mary Gibbs, Caitlin Glass, Michael Gough, Jessie James Grelle, Michael Vincent Jones, Christopher Judge, Brittney Karbowski, E. Jason Liebrecht, Jamie Marchi, David Matranga, Robert McCollum, Shannon McCormick, Trina Nishimura, Steve Prince, Carolina Ravassa, Monica Rial, Christopher Sabat, Ian Sinclair, Matilda Smedius, Ellyn Stern, Andre Stojka, Sonny Strait, Eric Vale, and Elise Zhang.
January 4–6, 2019	Sacramento Convention Center; Sheraton Grand Sacramento; Sacramento, California		Justin Briner, Kimberly Brooks, Luci Christian, Colleen Clinkenbeard, Jen Cohn, Jonny Cruz, Bill Farmer, Neil Kaplan, Josh Keaton, Rachael Lillis, Erica Luttrell, Jason Marsden, Charles Martinet, Brandon McInnis, Vic Mignogna, Chris Patton, Tara Sands, Sean Schemmel, Eric Stuart, J. Michael Tatum, Veronica Taylor, Eric Vale, and Christopher Wehkamp.
June 7–9, 2019	Sacramento Convention Center; Sheraton Grand Sacramento; Sacramento, California		Benz Antoine, Gregg Berger, Peter Blomquist, Hedy Burress, Sean Chiplock, Roger Clark, Jim Cummings, Aaron Dismuke, Curzon Dobell, Susan Eisenberg, Ricco Fajardo, Crispin Freeman, Dolya Gavanski, Kellen Goff, Todd Haberkorn, Jennifer Hale, Kyle Hebert, Joe Hernandez, Samantha Ireland, Katie Leigh, Terence McGovern, Alex McKenna, Huck Milner, Jamie Mortellaro, George Newbern, Steve J. Palmer, Bryce Papenbrook, Jim Santangeli, Lindsay Seidel, Gabriel Sloyer, Roger Craig Smith, Patricia Summersett, David Vincent, Rob Wiethoff, and Gwendoline Yeo.
January 3–5, 2020	Cal Expo; Sacramento, California		Dawn M. Bennett, Steve Blum, Johnny Yong Bosch, Ray Chase, Hayden Daviau, Robbie Daymond, Jack DeSena, Chloé Hollings, Brittney Karbowski, Brianna Knickerbocker, Reuben Langdon, Mary Elizabeth McGlynn, Max Mittelman, Michaela Jill Murphy, Stephanie Panisello, Adrian Petriw, and Michelle Ruff.
September 3–5, 2021	SAFE Credit Union Convention Center; Sacramento, California		Michael Bell, Jodi Benson, Justin Briner, Clifford Chapin, François Chau, Luci Christian, Leah Clark, Colleen Clinkenbeard, Amber Lee Connors, Justin Cook, Jessie James Grelle, Jamie Marchi, David Matranga, Kristen McGuire, Brandon McInnis, Emily Neves, Kyle Phillips, Monica Rial, Aaron Roberts, Jad Saxton, Sean Schemmel, Derick Snow, J. Michael Tatum, Austin Tindle, Alexis Tipton, and Keone Young.
January 7–9, 2022	SAFE Credit Union Convention Center; Sacramento, California		Zach Aguilar, Peter Behn, Morgan Berry, Johnny Yong Bosch, Ray Chase, Doug Cockle, Robbie Daymond, Aaron Dismuke, Steve Downes, Donnie Dunagan, Barbara Dunkelman, Kara Eberle, Bill Farmer, Kellen Goff, Todd Haberkorn, Jill Harris, Bret Iwan, Kenny James, Billy Kametz, Samantha Kelly, Erik Scott Kimerer, Brianna Knickerbocker, Jackie Lastra, Aleks Le, Cherami Leigh, Jason Marsden, Faye Mata, Taylor McNee, Max Mittelman, John Morris, James Mulligan, Trina Nishimura, Bryce Papenbrook, Dallas Reid, Laura Faye Smith, Daisuke Tsuji, and Cristina Vee.
September 2–4, 2022	SAFE Credit Union Convention Center; Sacramento, California		JB Blanc, Greg Cipes, Nicholas Corda, Brittany Cox, Darrel J. Delfin, Brian Donovan, Steve Downes, Maile Flanagan, Tom Gibis, Michael Haigney, Kate Higgins, Megan Hollingshead, Justine Huxley, Nadji Jeter, Margaret Kerry, Anjali Kunapaneni, Alan Lee, Rachael Lillis, Yuri Lowenthal, Charles Martinet, Robb Moreira, Elle Newlands, Khary Payton, Tara Platt, Nicolas Roye, Christopher Sabat, Tara Sands, Sean Schemmel, Roger Craig Smith, Jason Spisak, Tara Strong, Eric Stuart, Jen Taylor, Veronica Taylor, Brandon Winckler, Thomas Wynn, Michael Yurchak, and Stuart Zagnit.
January 6–8, 2023	SAFE Credit Union Convention Center; Sacramento, California		Zach Aguilar, Troy Baker, Greg Baldwin, Dante Basco, Johnny Yong Bosch, Justin Briner, Steve Burton, Shannon Chan-Kent, Clifford Chapin, Colleen Clinkenbeard, Ian James Corlett, Grey DeLisle, Jack DeSena, Brian Drummond, Rick Farmiloe, Adam Gibbs, Olivia Hack, Alessandro Juliani, David Kaye, Jennie Kwan, Cricket Leigh, David Matranga, Jillian Michaels, Michaela Jill Murphy, George Newbern, Trina Nishimura, Bryce Papenbrook, Deborah Estelle Phillips, Jonah Scott, James Sie, Austin St. John, Brad Swaile, Jen Taylor, Austin Tindle, Abby Trott, Mae Whitman, Sarah Wiedenheft, and Dave Wittenberg.
September 1–3, 2023	SAFE Credit Union Convention Center; Sacramento, California	29,000	Irene Bedard, Steve Blum, Jim Cummings, Tony Fleecs, Adam Harrington, Cissy Jones, Christopher Judge, Tom Kenny, Gabe Kunda, Mela Lee, Erica Luttrell, Toshio Maeda, Xander Mobus, Cassandra Lee Morris, Brandon Potter, Ian Sinclair, Dan Southworth, Sonny Strait, Christopher Wehkamp, Johnny Young, and Stephanie Young Brehm.
January 5–7, 2024	SAFE Credit Union Convention Center; Sacramento, California		Kelly Baskin, Laila Berzins, Griffin Burns, Sean Chiplock, Luci Christian, Colleen Clinkenbeard, John DiMaggio, Marisa Duran, Kyle Hebert, Richard Horvitz, Jennie Kwan, Amanda "AmaLee" Lee, E. Jason Liebrecht, Erica Lindbeck, Yuri Lowenthal, Josey McCoy, Brandon McKinney, Vivian Nixon-Williams, Kyle Phillips, Bryce Pinkham, Tara Platt, Brandon Rogers, Alejandro Saab, Christopher Sabat, Stephanie Sheh, David Sobolov, Stephanie Southerland, and Cristina Vee.
August 30 – September 1, 2024	SAFE Credit Union Convention Center; Sacramento, California		Laura Bailey, Tia Ballard, Ryan Bartley, Dawn M. Bennett, Jodi Benson, Johnny Yong Bosch, Ray Chase, Leah Clark, Robbie Daymond, Jessica Fong, Sandy Fox, Erika Henningsen, Tom Kenny, Brianna Knickerbocker, Anjali Kunapaneni, Lex Lang, Linda Larkin, Cherami Leigh, Adam McArthur, David McCormack, Brandon McKinney, Vivienne Medrano, Max Mittelman, Xander Mobus, Bill Morrison, Paige O'Hara, Alejandra Reynoso, Blake Roman, Jad Saxton, Stephanie Sheh, The Slants, Amir Talai, Kaiji Tang, Marie Westbrook, Travis Willingham, Anne Yatco, and Melanie Zanetti.
January 3–5, 2025	SAFE Credit Union Convention Center; Sacramento, California		Adassa, Zach Aguilar, Troy Baker, A.J. Beckles, Harry Belden, Edward Bosco, Alex Brightman, Griffin Burns, Ian Cardoni, Greg Chun, Dameon Clarke, Ben Diskin, D.C. Douglas, Jason Douglas, Lizzie Freeman, Spencer Grammer, Kyle Hebert, Ali Hillis, Kazha, Erik Scott Kimerer, Michael Kovach, Aleks Le, Ron Lim, Faye Mata, Brandon McKinney, Mark Meer, Trina Nishimura, Liam O'Brien, Bryce Papenbrook, Anairis Quiñones, Sam Riegel, Leslie Rodriguez Kritzer, Christopher Sabat, William Salyers, Sean Schemmel, Patrick Seitz, Sonny Strait, Courtenay Taylor, Abby Trott, Kari Wahlgren, and Dave Wittenberg.
August 29–31, 2025	SAFE Credit Union Convention Center; Memorial Auditorium; Sacramento, California		Maxwell Atoms, Laura Bailey, Troy Baker, Katelyn Barr, Steve Blum, Abigail Blythe, Kira Buckland, Pete Capella, Greg Cipes, Jim Cummings, Grey DeLisle Griffin, Aaron Dismuke, Barbara Dunkelman, Greg Eagles, Kara Eberle, Kellen Goff, Jason Griffith, Richard Horvitz, Xanthe Huynh, Mia Sinclair Jenness, Ashley Johnson, Lindsay Jones, Wendee Lee, Ryan Colt Levy, Emi Lo, David Lodge, Lucy Lowe, Jason Marnocha, Landon McDonald, Brandon McKinney, Scott Menville, Kayli Mills, Dave B. Mitchell, Reagan Murdock, Colleen O'Shaughnessey, Khary Payton, Poppy Lop, Reed Shannon, Stephen Silver, Tara Strong, Marta Svetek, Nazeeh Tarsha, Kirk Thornton, Sarah Wiedenheft, Travis Willingham, Shannon Woodward, Suzie Yeung, and Arryn Zech.
January 2–4, 2026	SAFE Credit Union Convention Center; Memorial Auditorium; Sacramento, California		Daniel Baugh, Bryson Baugus, Michael Bell, Alex Brightman, François Chau, Charlet Chung, Allegra Clark, Colleen Clinkenbeard, Jonny Cruz, Pam Dougherty, Bill Farmer, Rick Farmiloe, Sandy Fox, Stephen Fu, John Gremillion, Damien Haas, May Hong, Bret Iwan, Gabe Kunda, Lex Lang, Michaela Laws, Alan Lee, Cherami Leigh, Ron Lim, Faye Mata, Adam McArthur, Joel McDonald, Kayleigh McKee, Brandon McKinney, Vivienne Medrano, Xander Mobus, Cassandra Lee Morris, Trina Nishimura, Alex Organ, Bryce Papenbrook, Ernie Reyes Jr., Robbie Rist, Zeno Robinson, Kenn Scott, Megan Shipman, Keith Silverstein, Kaiji Tang, Dana Terrace, Brian Tochi, Natalie Van Sistine, David Vincent, and Anne Yatco.
April 24–26, 2026	Cal Expo; Sacramento, California		Nick Apostolides, Don Bluth, Catherine Cavadini, Marty Grabstein, Jarrod Greene, Matt Hill, Lauren Landa, David Matranga, Candi Milo, Vivian Nixon-Williams, Brina Palencia, Phil Parsons, Tony Sampson, Patrick Seitz, John Swasey, Sam Vincent Khouth, Emma Rose Creaner, Delanie Nicole Gill, Angela Sant'Albano, and Dan Molina.
September 4–6, 2026	SAFE Credit Union Convention Center; Memorial Auditorium; Sacramento, California		Zach Aguilar, Tia Ballard, A.J. Beckles, Johnny Yong Bosch, Erik Braa, Griffin Burns, Clifford Chapin, Greg Chun, Charlet Chung, Dameon Clarke, Owen Dennis, Ben Diskin, Steve Downes, Kara Edwards, Chris Hackney, Kyle Hebert, Mara Junot, Brittney Karbowski, Josh Keaton, Brianna Knickerbocker, Amanda "AmaLee" Lee, E. Jason Liebrecht, Erica Lindbeck, Yuri Lowenthal, Daniel Marin, Elizabeth Maxwell, Kristen McGuire, Max Mittelman, Patrick Pedraza, Josh Petersdorf, Tara Platt, Carolina Ravassa, Brandon Rogers, Michelle Rojas, Christopher Sabat, Jad Saxton, Sean Schemmel, Jeff Steitzer, Alpha Takahashi, Jen Taylor, Abby Trott, Kari Wahlgren, Ming-Na Wen, and Joe Zieja.
January 8–10, 2027	SAFE Credit Union Convention Center; Sacramento, California		Courtney Lin, Debi Derryberry, Christine Marie Cabanos, Vincent Martella, David Errigo Jr., Olivia Rose Olson, Alyson Stoner, Justin Briner, J. Michael Tatum, Brandon McInnis, Monica Rial, Christopher Uminga.

== SacAnime Roseville ==
SacAnime Roseville (formerly Anime: Roseville and SacAnime Spring) was a three-day anime convention held at Roebbelen Center @the Grounds in Roseville, California. The 2019 event was one day. Anime: Roseville 2020 was at first postponed from April to August due to the COVID-19 pandemic, with the 2020 event later being cancelled. Due to the events growth, for 2026 it moved to Cal Expo in Sacramento, California and returned to the name SacAnime Spring.

=== Event history ===
Dates	Location	Atten.	Guests
August 18, 2019	Fairgrounds Placer County; Roseville, California		Cherami Leigh and Trina Nishimura.
April 15–17, 2022	Roebbelen Center @the Grounds; Roseville, California		Katelyn Barr, Ian James Corlett, Chris Guerrero, Chuck Huber, Kazha, Phil LaMarr, Lauren Landa, Mike McFarland, Ry McKeand, Griffin Puatu, Jonah Scott, John Swasey, Lauren Tom, and Billy West.
April 7–9, 2023	Roebbelen Center @the Grounds; Roseville, California		Carlos Alazraqui, Felecia Angelle, Ryan Bartley, Susanne Blakeslee, Grey DeLisle, Jessie James Grelle, Butch Hartman, Neil Kaplan, Jamie Marchi, Charles Martinet, Daran Norris, Colleen O'Shaughnessey, Mike Pollock, Michelle Ruff, Jad Saxton, Roger Craig Smith, Tara Strong, and Wally Wingert.
March 29–31, 2024	Roebbelen Center @the Grounds; Roseville, California		Daniel Baugh, Anthony Bowling, Clifford Chapin, Amber Lee Connors, Jordan Dash Cruz, Kelsey Cruz, R. Bruce Elliott, David Errigo Jr., Bill Farmer, Cris George, John Gremillion, Bret Iwan, Lauren Landa, Vincent Martella, Elizabeth Maxwell, Brandon McKinney, John Morris, Trina Nishimura, Phil Parsons, Mallorie Rodak, and Ian Sinclair.
April 18–20, 2025	Roebbelen Center @the Grounds; Roseville, California		Reba Buhr, Todd Haberkorn, Kathleen Herles, Megan Hollingshead, Bob Joles, Mela Lee, Brandon McKinney, Brent Mukai, Tony Oliver, Jonathan Todd Ross, Tara Sands, Steve Staley, Janet Varney, Dave Wittenberg, and Michael Yurchak.

== Bak-Anime ==
Bak-Anime is an annual one- or two-day anime convention held at the Bakersfield Marriott at the Convention Center in Bakersfield, California by the staff of Sac-Anime. The convention began due to the requests of fans from the Bakersfield Comic Con.

== SacAnime Gives Back! ==
SacAnime Gives Back! was a one-day charity anime convention held at the McClellan Conference Center in McClellan Park, California.

=== Event history ===
Dates	Location	Atten.	Guests
May 15, 2016	McClellan Conference Center; McClellan Park, California		Ali Hillis and Cherami Leigh.

== SacAnime Swap Meet ==
SacAnime Swap Meets were events held at the Placer Valley Event Center in Roseville, California. September's Swap Meet was also known as the Roseville Comic-Con. The January 2021 event was postponed due to the COVID-19 pandemic. The April 2021 event occurred under controversial circumstances. Placer County's COVID-19 vaccination center at the Swap Meet's venue closed for the event. The vaccination center traditionally didn't operate over weekends and SacAnime offered to adjust its needed space, which ended up not being necessary. SacAnime had mask and social distancing rules during the event, which was branded as a swap meet with only vendors. Issues during the event included a lack of social distancing, poor mask enforcement, and no hand sanitizing dispensers in the event space.

=== Event history ===
Dates	Location	Atten.	Guests
September 27, 2020	Placer Valley Event Center; Roseville, California		Johnny Yong Bosch
April 2–4, 2021	Placer Valley Event Center; Roseville, California	6,000	Christina Marie Kelly, E. Jason Liebrecht, Chris Marrinan, Christopher Sabat, and Molly Searcy.

== Anime: Roseville Swap Meet ==
Anime: Roseville Swap Meet was an event held at the Placer Valley Event Center in Roseville, California.

=== Event history ===
Dates	Location	Atten.	Guests
June 6, 2021	Placer Valley Event Center; Roseville, California		Aaron Dismuke, Elizabeth Maxwell, and Eric Vale.
