= Kazha =

Japanese rock band

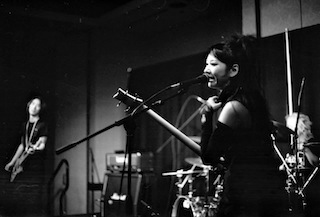
- Kazha performing in 2014

Background information
- Origin: Tokyo, Japan; Los Angeles, California, United States
- Genres: Rock, Heavy metal, Alternative rock, alternative metal
- Years active: 2009–present
- Website: www.kazha.net

Kazha is a rock band founded in 2009 by a Japanese singer/songwriter Kazuha Oda and a guitarist Hideki Matsushige, categorized in Hard Rock and sometimes in Heavy Metal. It used to be a 4-piece band but became 3-piece with Kazuha Oda being a bass/vocal.

== Band biography ==
The band’s name is taken from the vocalist Kazuha Oda's first name. The band debut in Japan with the release of their first EP Breathe Through Your Dreams in September 2009. After the release of the first album Overture, Kazha made their USA debut performing at Asian Heritage Street Celebration in San Francisco, California. Since 2011, they have been touring internationally; Korea, Europe, Mexico and U.S.A., appearing at various Anime conventions and Festivals including SacAnime, Nan Desu Kan, Phoenix Comicon, and Saboten Con as their musical guest. The band is now touring as an official ambassador of Music Export Memphis, representing the Birth Place of Rock'N'Roll Memphis, Tennessee.

== Discography ==
- Reflection (2022)
- Kazha (2018)
- Evolution (2013)
- I Still Remember -Single version- (2010)
- Overture (2010)
- Breathe Through Your Dreams (2009)

== Band members ==
=== Current members ===
- Kazuha Oda – Vocals|Bass guitar (2009–present)
- Hideki Matsushige – Guitar (2009–present)
