= Matsushige =

Matsushige may refer to:

- Matsushige, Tokushima, a town in Itano District, Tokushima Prefecture, Japan

== People with the given name ==
- Matsushige Ono (大野 松茂, born 1936), Japanese politician

== People with the surname ==
- Hideki Matsushige, Japanese guitarist
- Yoshito Matsushige (松重 美人, 1913–2005), Japanese photojournalist
- Yutaka Matsushige (松重 豊, born 1963), Japanese actor
