= Hideki Matsushige =

Japanese musician

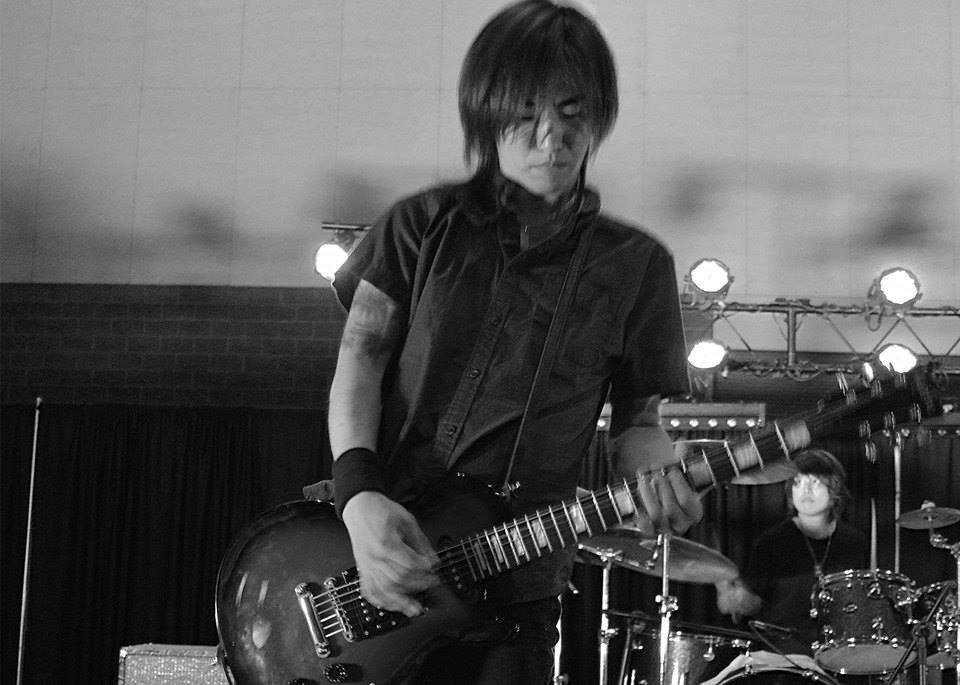
- Matsushige at the Arkansas Anime Festival in 2017

Background information
- Born: Japan
- Genres: Rock; heavy metal
- Occupations: Guitarist, Composer, Producer
- Instrument: Guitar
- Website: www.kazha.net

Hideki Matsushige is a Japanese musician, guitarist, composer, and producer, known for being the co-founder, lead guitarist for the Japanese rock band Kazha. He has been working with Japanese singer-songwriter Kazuha Oda for over a decade. They released their first album Overture in 2010. He has released 2 EPs, 3 albums, and 1 single with Kazha. He has appeared and performed at numerous anime and comic conventions with Kazha as guests of honor.

== Guitars ==
Hideki has been an endorser of ESP Guitars since 2018, and playing his Artist Model Guitar.

== Discography ==
=== Kazha ===
- Kazha (2018)
- Evolution (2013)
- "I Still Remember" -Single version- (2010)
- Overture (2010)
- Breathe Through Your Dreams (2009)
