= Party in the Park =

Name given to some UK music festivals

Party in the Park is the generic name given to music concerts organised by various radio stations and local authorities and groups in the United Kingdom, typically in large parks during the summer, however it is also used to refer to a family oriented event where people can literally have a Party in the Park.

== Party in the Park Nanaimo ==
Party in the Park Nanaimo is in the third iteration. 2018's event is headlining Madeline Merlo, JJ Shiplett and Andrew Hyatt. The inaugural Party In The Park headlined Monster Truck, One Bad Son and Girls Guns and Glory. Party In The Park Nanaimo 2017 headlined Aaron Pirchett, Lion Bear Fox and EagleEyes. The annual outdoor music festival that occurs in Nanaimo, British Columbia every June is held on the 37,000-square-metre (400,000 sq ft) Beban Sports Fields.

== Leeds' Party in the Park ==
Party in the Park, Leeds was an annual free event, held in Leeds on the grounds of Temple Newsam by Leeds City Council and 96.3 Radio Aire. It took place each year the day after Opera in the Park at the same location and attracted around 70,000 people.

The event started in 1994 and was headlined by Bad Boys Inc and included performances by E.Y.C.

In 2011, tickets for Party in the park were prioritised for people with a Leeds postcode since it was an event held by Leeds City Council and also had overwhelming demand for tickets from all over West Yorkshire.

It was decided in 2013 by Leeds City Council that the tickets would no longer be free due to budget restrictions. Instead, they would be priced at up to £10 each.

Finally in 2014, Leeds City Council and 96.3 Radio Aire announced that Party in the Park would be cancelled due to a lack of funds. The concert has not returned since.

Previous artists to perform: Atomic Kitten, Westlife, Busted, McFly, Forbidden JUiCE, Olly Murs, The Wanted, Kelly Rowland, Peter Andre, JLS, Ricky Martin, E.Y.C., MN8, Deuce, 911, B*Witched, Fast Food Rockers, Louise Redknapp, Bad Boys Inc, Let Loose, Ultimate Kaos, Kavana, Five, Scouting for Girls, The Saturdays, Jason Donovan, Craig David, Damage, Pixie Lott, Girls Aloud, The Baseballs, Chicane, Ross Copperman, Alesha Dixon, Cher Lloyd, Jay Sean, Shayne Ward, Alexandra Burke, Alyssa Reid, Arctic Monkeys, Conor Maynard, Cover Drive, DJ Fresh, Labrinth, Little Mix, Marcus Collins, One Direction, Professor Green, Stooshe, Tulisa Contostavlos, Wretch 32, Inna.

== Former events ==
=== Luton Rising presents Party in the Park ===
Luton Rising presents Party in the Park is a one-off event that occurred on 12 September 2026 at Stockwood Park to celebrate 150 years since Luton became a borough. Among the acts that performed were Rickie & Melvin, JW Paris, Olivia Lynn, The Hoosiers, The Feeling, and the headlining Kaiser Chiefs.

=== Global Radio's Party in the Park ===
Party in the Park was a fundraiser event for the Prince's Trust, but was cancelled in 2005 due to the Live 8 concerts, when the Prince's Trust received £1.6 million in compensation from the Live 8 text message hotline.

- London
  in Hyde Park, London by 95.8 Capital FM
- Brighton
  in Preston Park by Southern FM
- Cardiff
  in Bute Park by Red Dragon FM
- Kent
  in The Hop Farm Country Park by Invicta FM
- Oxford
  in South Park by Fox FM
- Southampton
  on Southampton Common by Power FM, called Power in the Park

=== UTV Radio's Party in the Park ===
Party in the Park was cancelled in 2006 by UTV Radio, due to an insight of the recession in the United Kingdom.

- Bingley
  by The Pulse of West Yorkshire
- Stoke-on-Trent
  in Britannia Stadium by Signal 1
- Swansea
  in Singleton Park by The Wave

=== Orion Media's Party in the Park ===
- Birmingham
  in Cannon Hill Park by BRMB (due to BRMB's sale to Orion Media, Party in the Park was going to be reintroduced to Birmingham in 2010 but was axed in favour of BRMB Live at the LG Arena in November 2010)

== See also ==
- List of music festivals in the United Kingdom
- Benefit concert
