= Anya Fernald =

American chef and businessperson (born 1975)

- Fernald at Belcampo Farms, 2019
- Born: Germany
- Education: Wesleyan University
- Occupations: Entrepreneur and business consultant
- Years active: 2000–present
- Spouse: Renato Sardo (m. 2004–2012)
- Children: 2

Anya Fernald (born 1975) is an American entrepreneur, chef, and sustainable agriculture expert based in the San Francisco Bay Area. She founded Live Culture Co., a business and marketing consulting company, the Eat Real Festival Company, and Belcampo Meat Co., a producer of allegedly sustainably sourced meats headquartered in Oakland, California, which shut down due to the revelation of unethical practices, of which she was founding CEO. She has published a cookbook and appeared as a judge on the Food Network's Iron Chef America, Iron Chef Gauntlet, and The Next Iron Chef.

== Early life and education ==
Fernald was born on a raw-milk dairy farm outside Munich, Germany, while her parents were teaching and researching abroad. When she was 3 years old, her family moved back to the United States, eventually settling in Palo Alto, California, and then Oregon. After graduating from Wesleyan University with a degree in political science, she received a Thomas J. Watson Fellowship, leading to work as an itinerant cheesemaker in Europe and North Africa.

== Career ==
=== Europe (1999–2005) ===
From 1999 to 2001, Fernald developed and implemented business and marketing plans for small-scale cheese makers in Sicily for rural development initiative funded by the European Union, CoRFiLaC. She subsequently directed the International Presidia program at Slow Food in Bra, Italy, where until 2005 she devised and instigated an international micro-investment program that managed business planning and marketing for small-scale artisan food producers in countries such as Madagascar, Sweden, Ecuador and Bosnia.

=== United States (2006–present) ===
Soon after returning to California in 2006, Fernald founded a produce distribution company connecting high-quality farmers to large institutional buyers, which was later acquired. In 2008 she began working with Alice Waters as executive director of Slow Food Nation to organize and direct a large event to raise the profile of high-quality organic food.

In 2009, Fernald founded the Eat Real Festival Company, which produces an annual, two-day food festival in Oakland, California. This company was acquired in 2015. The festival focuses on food and drinks produced locally, sustainably and organically.

Also in 2009, Fernald founded Live Culture Co., a business and marketing consulting firm. In 2010, the company began working with Todd Robinson to develop a concept to market products from a ranch he owned in Northern California. This consulting engagement resulted in the development of Belcampo, which Fernald and Robinson founded in 2012. Fernald and Robinson also collaborated on a project in Belize, which later became Copal Tree Farms and Lodge.

=== Belcampo ===
Under Fernald's watch as CEO, Belcampo was the subject of some controversies. The USDA had begun federal investigations into Belcampo for various violations, including sanitation, safety, and labeling at their Siskiyou County plant, leading up to its closure in 2021. Inspections revealed poor hygiene, mislabeled meat, and operational failures. A wage theft lawsuit in 2020 was brought by an employee named Maria Celina Perez Aguilera on behalf of herself and other employees. The suit alleged a variety of labor and wage theft violations, including failure to pay workers minimum wage, failure to pay overtime wages, and failure by the company to adequately allow for employee meal breaks. Belcampo agreed to pay $750,000 as part of a legal settlement that does not admit any wrongdoing on behalf of the company. Fernald was CEO until August 2020, when Garry Embleton became co-CEO. The company closed in October 2021 after a former butcher Evan Reiner reported that it had fraudulently labeled cuts of meat as produced by Belcampo when they had been sourced from other producers.

=== Television ===
Fernald began working as a judge and sustainable food expert on the Food Network's Iron Chef America franchise in 2009, and continued to appear regularly until 2015. She has also appeared on CBS This Morning.

== Publications ==
In spring 2016, Fernald released her debut cookbook, Home Cooked: Essential Recipes for a New Way to Cook, with Ten Speed Press.

== Honors ==
In 2010, Fernald was named one of 40 Big Food Thinkers 40 and Under by Food & Wine magazine, one of the top 100 female founders in INC Magazine, and one of The New York Times' Nifty 50, recognizing America's up-and-coming talent.

== Personal life ==
Fernald was married to Renato Sardo, former head of Slow Food International; as of 2009, they lived in Oakland. The couple had a daughter, but as of 2014 had separated.
