= Berkeley Jazz Festival =

Coordinates: 37°52′25″N 122°15′15″W

The Berkeley Jazz Festival
- Genre: Jazz, blues, rock, R&B
- Dates: July
- Locations: Berkeley, California, U.S.
- Years active: 1967–present

The Berkeley Jazz Festival is held once a year at the outdoors Hearst Greek Theatre on the University of California, Berkeley campus. The theatre overlooks the San Francisco Bay at Hearst & Gayley Road. The festival was started in 1967 by Darlene Chan.

== Notable performers ==
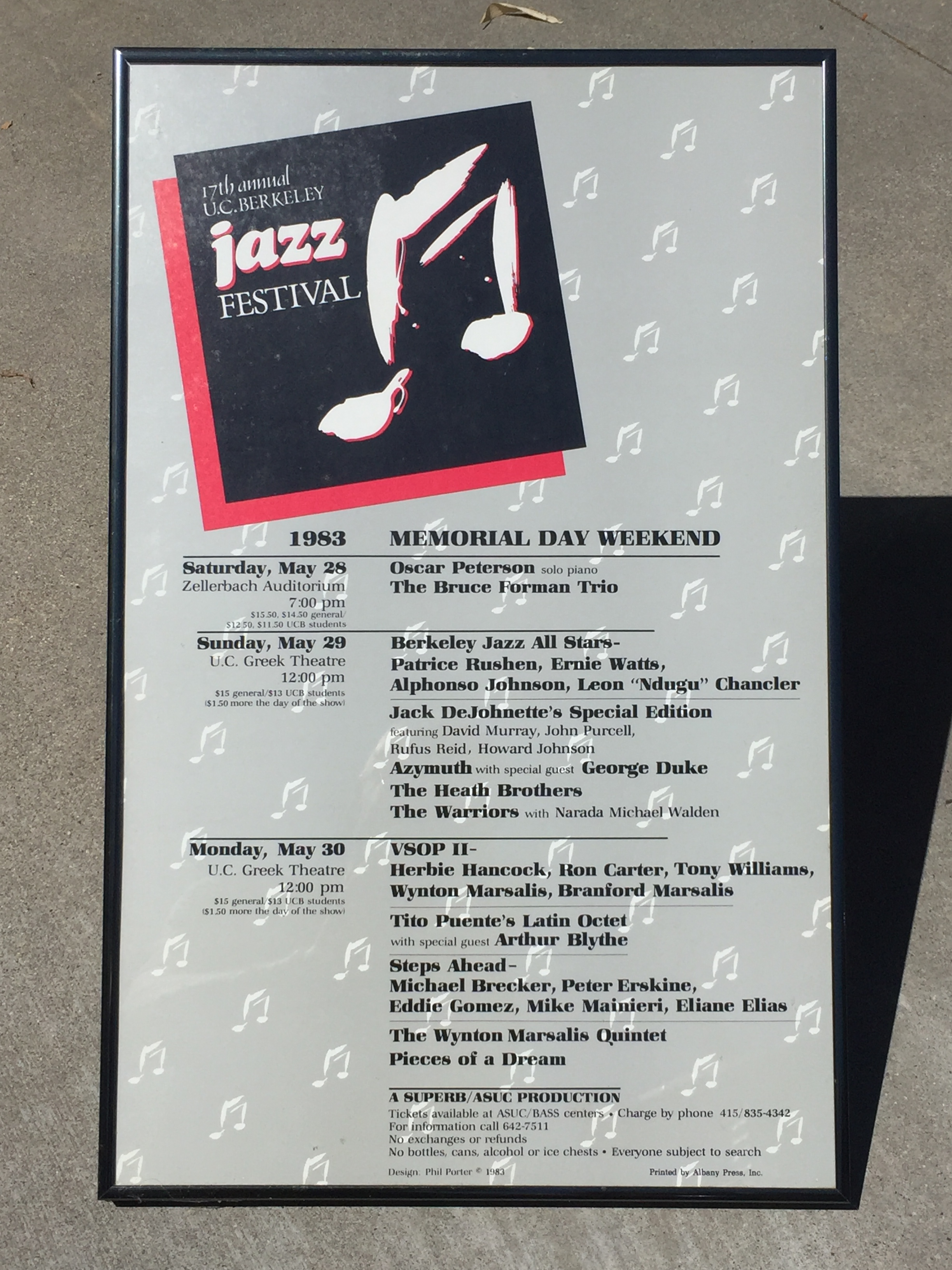
Berkeley Jazz Festival - poster for 1983

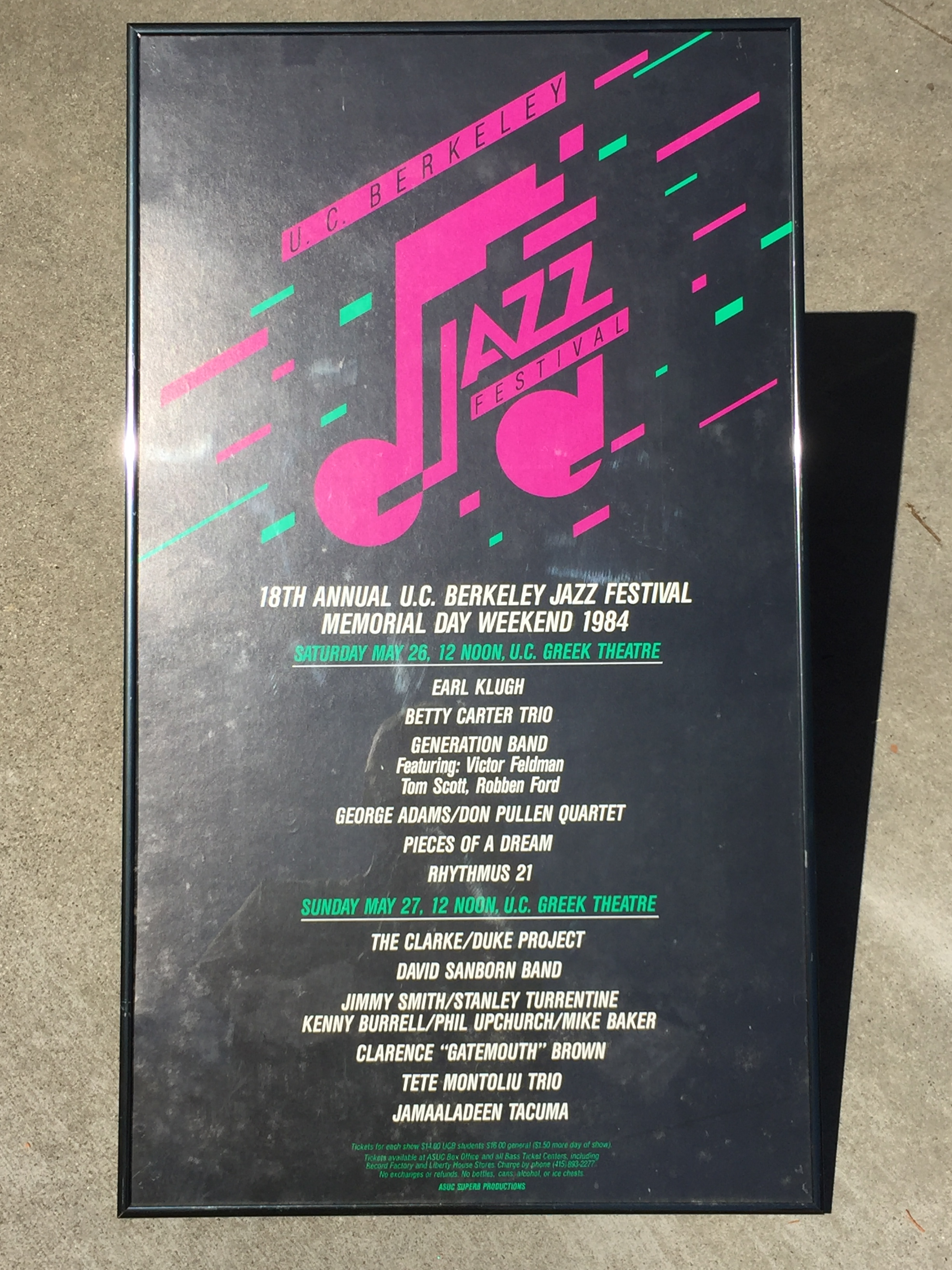
Berkeley Jazz Festival - poster for 1984

=== Original Festival ===
==== 1967 ====
The first festival was scheduled to be held April 7–8 at the Greek Theater on the Berkeley campus of the University of California, but due to heavy rain it was moved indoors into Harmon Gym. Friday evening saw sets by Miles Davis, the Modern Jazz Quartet, and the Gerald Wilson Big Band. On Saturday, the Bill Evans Trio, the Horace Silver Quintet, the John Handy Concert Ensemble, and Big Mama Thornton performed. The festival was planned and sponsored by the Union Program Board of the Associated Students of the University of California and the Interfraternity Council with Ralph J. Gleason, columnist of the S.F. Chronicle, as friend and advisor. Darlene Chan was the festival's founder and its first director.

==== 1968 ====
The second annual festival was sponsored by the Union Program Board of the Associated Students Of the U of California and held in April–May. Miles Davis, Carmen McRae, Bobby Hutcherson and Harold Land Quartet, Billy Taylor, Thelonious Monk, Cecil Taylor. He was not there. Billy Taylor was both a performer (piano) and the Emcee of the piano workshop and the evening concerts → and the Thad Jones/Mel Lewis Big Band with Joe Williams . Davis appeared with the Gil Evans Orchestra, the first time the two men had played together since their 1961 Carnegie Hall concert. Wayne Shorter composed some of the music played by Davis and Gill Evan's Orchestra.The 1968 performance was Davis' last one with that group. Lalo Schifrin lectured on jazz music on April 20.

==== 1969 ====
Held in April–May, 1969, with Cannonball Adderley Quintet, Sonny Rollins, Max Roach and Abbey Lincoln, Nina Simone, Herbie Hancock Sextet, Tony Williams, Zutty Singleton, Roy Haynes, Albert King, Archie Shepp, and King Errison. Martha and the Vandellas canceled due to illness and were replaced by the Ed Hawkins Singers.

==== 1974 ====
Saxophonist Prince Lasha, leading an eight-piece group which included pianist Herbie Hancock and bassist Ron Carter, played a set three songs of which were released by ENJA Records.

==== 1975 - The Ninth Annual Berkeley Jazz Festival ====
Stanley Turrentine - Grover Washington, Jr. - Donald Byrd and the Blackbyrds - Taj Mahal (musician) - Joe Bataan - Freddie Hubbard - Gil Scott-Heron - Les McCann - Eddie Harris Cannonball Adderley and Nat Adderley

==== 1976 - The Tenth Annual Berkeley Jazz Festival ====
Friday May 28: Charles Mingus Quintet with Nat Adderley - Rahsaan Roland Kirk and the Vibration Society - George Benson
Saturday, May 29: Weather Report - Hubert Laws featuring Patrice Rushen - Lonnie Liston Smith and the Cosmic Echoes
Sunday, May 30: McCoy Tyner - Ramsey Lewis - Betty Carter - Ronnie Laws and Pressure

==== 1977 - The Eleventh Annual Berkeley Jazz Festival ====
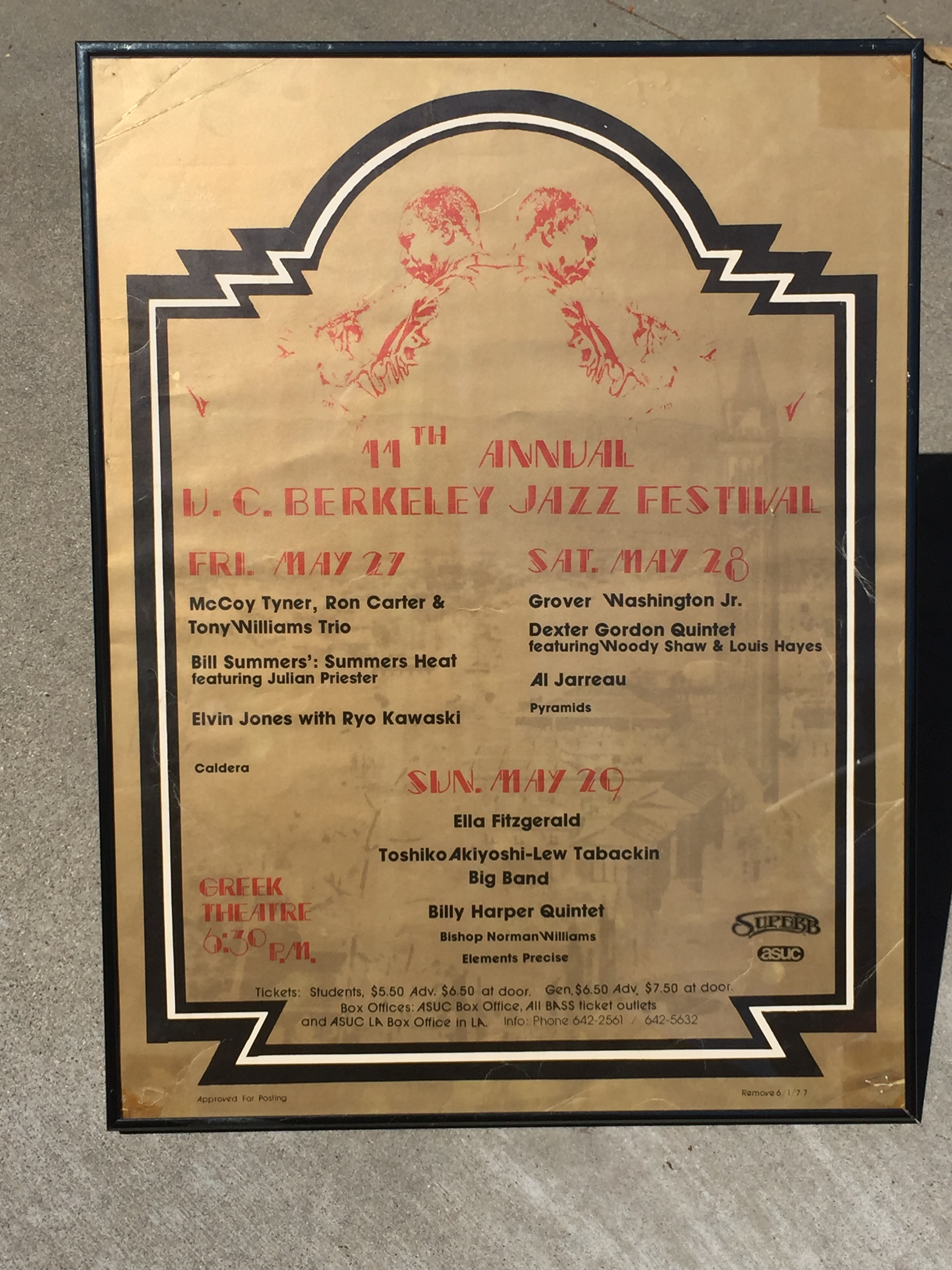

Friday May 27: McCoy Tyner/Tony Williams/Ron Carter - Elvin Jones with Ryo Kawasaki - Jean Carn - Bill Summers & Julian Priestley Summers Heat
Saturday, May 28: Grover Washington, Jr. - Dexter Gordon with Woody Shaw & Louis Hayes - Al Jarreau - Pyramids
Sunday, May 29: Ella Fitzgerald - Toshiko Akiyoshi-Lew Tabackin Big Band - Billy Harper - Bishop Norman Williams - Elements Precise George Duke appeared as well.

==== 1978 - The Twelfth Annual Berkeley Jazz Festival ====
(Dedicated to Rahsaan Roland Kirk, 1936–1977)

Saturday May 20 - Bay Area Jazz Band Day: Ridd'm - Sadaka - Gregory James Quartet - Listen with Mel Martin
Saturday, May 27: Airto Moreira & Flora Purim - Ramsey Lewis - Freddie Hubbard - Hubert Laws - Michael Franks
Sunday, May 28: Night Flyte - Noel Pointer - Oscar Peterson/Ray Brown/Louis Bellson - Herbie Hancock/Ron Carter/Tony Williams - Eddie Jefferson featuring George Cables & Richie Cole

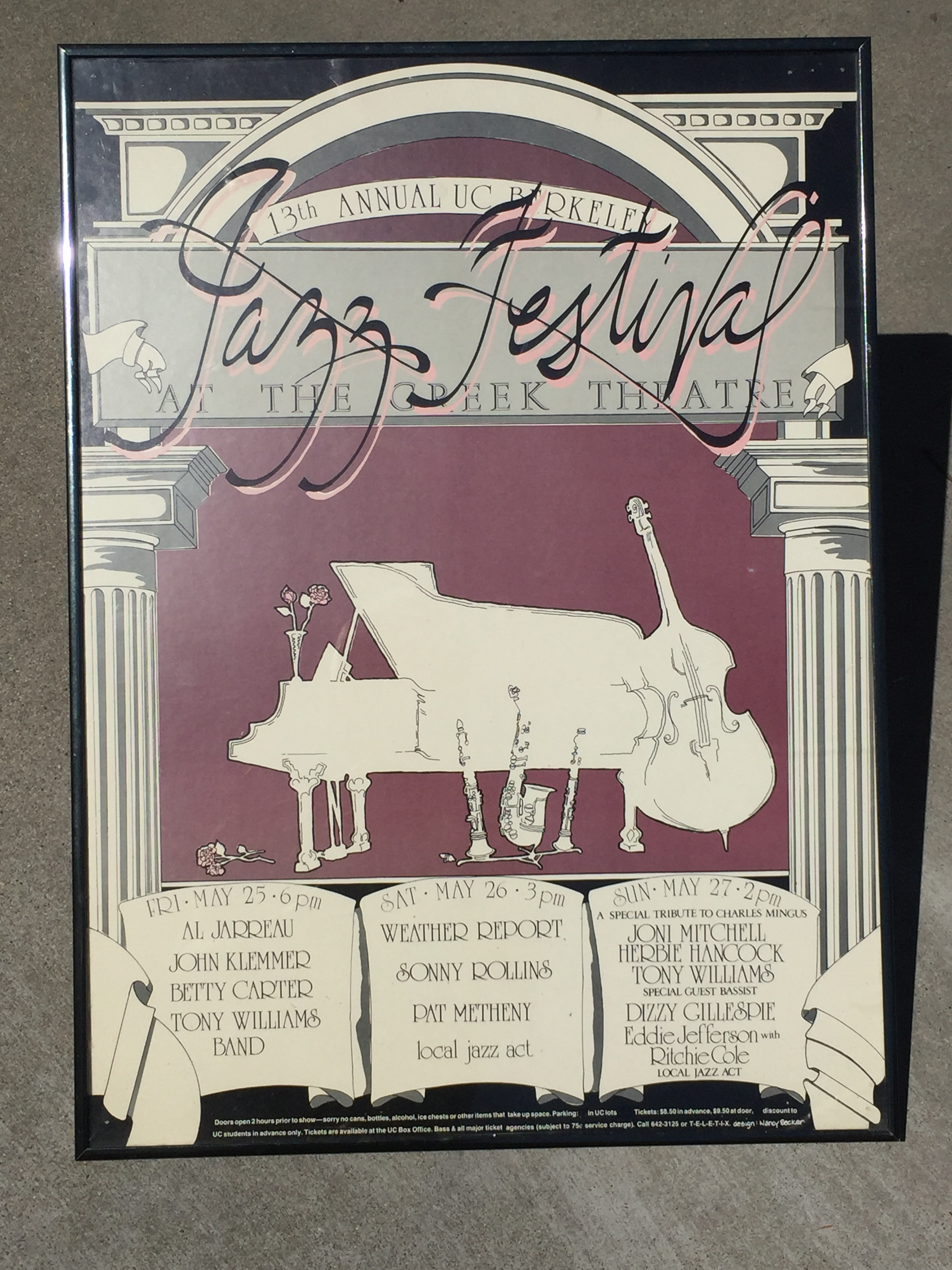

==== 1979 - The Thirteenth Annual Berkeley Jazz Festival ====
Friday May 25: Al Jarreau - John Klemmer - Betty Carter - Tony Williams Band
Saturday, May 26: Weather Report - Sonny Rollins - Pat Metheny - Art Lande & Rubisa Patrol
Sunday, May 27: A Special Tribute to Charles Mingus: Joni Mitchell, Jaco Pastorius, Don Alias, Herbie Hancock and Tony Williams - Dizzy Gillespie - Eddie Jefferson with Richie Cole

==== 1980 - The 14th Annual Berkeley Jazz Festival ====
John McLaughlin, Sheila Escovedo, Tom Browne, The Manhattan Transfer and Christian Escoudé

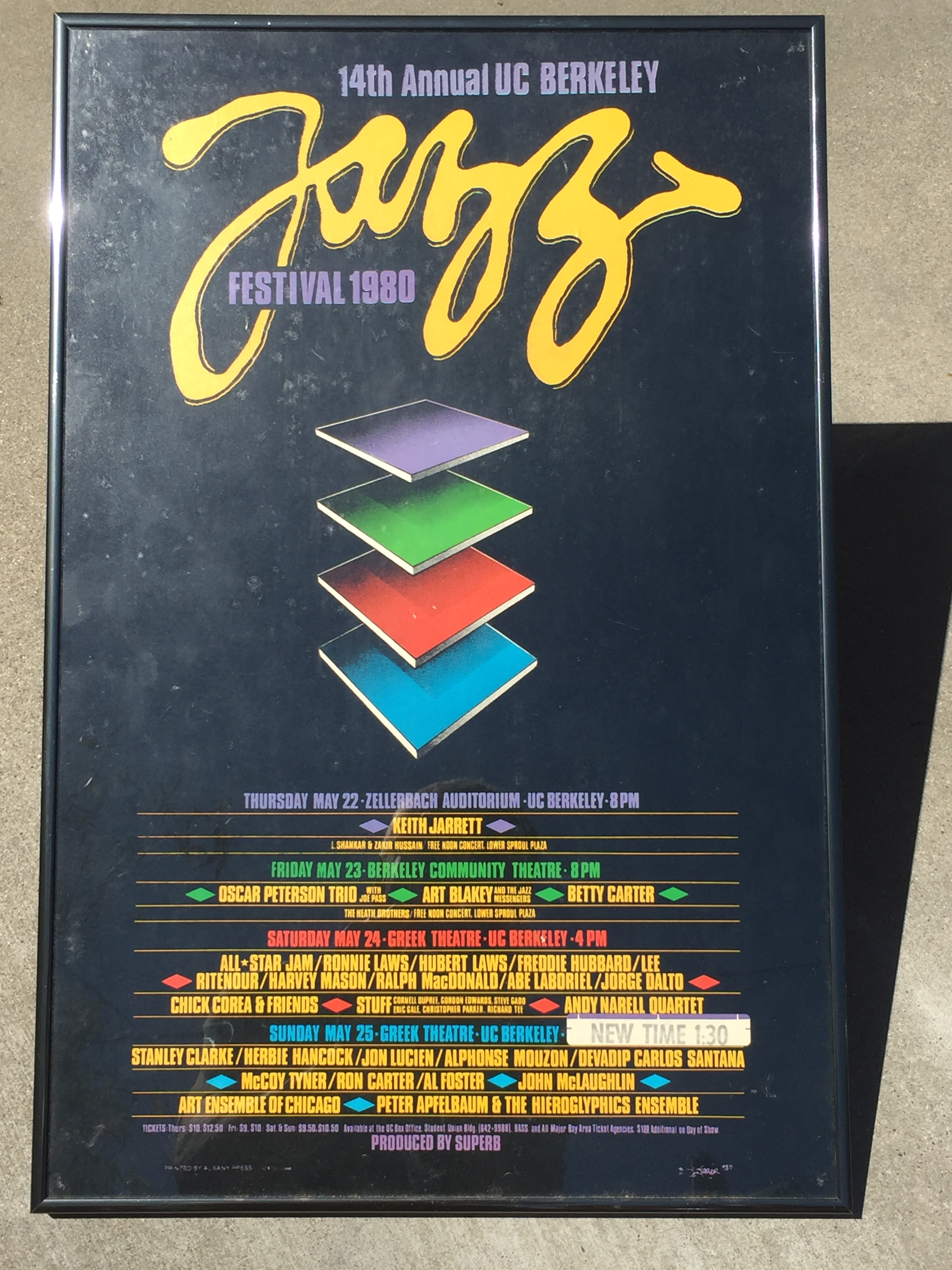
Berkeley Jazz Festival - poster for 1980

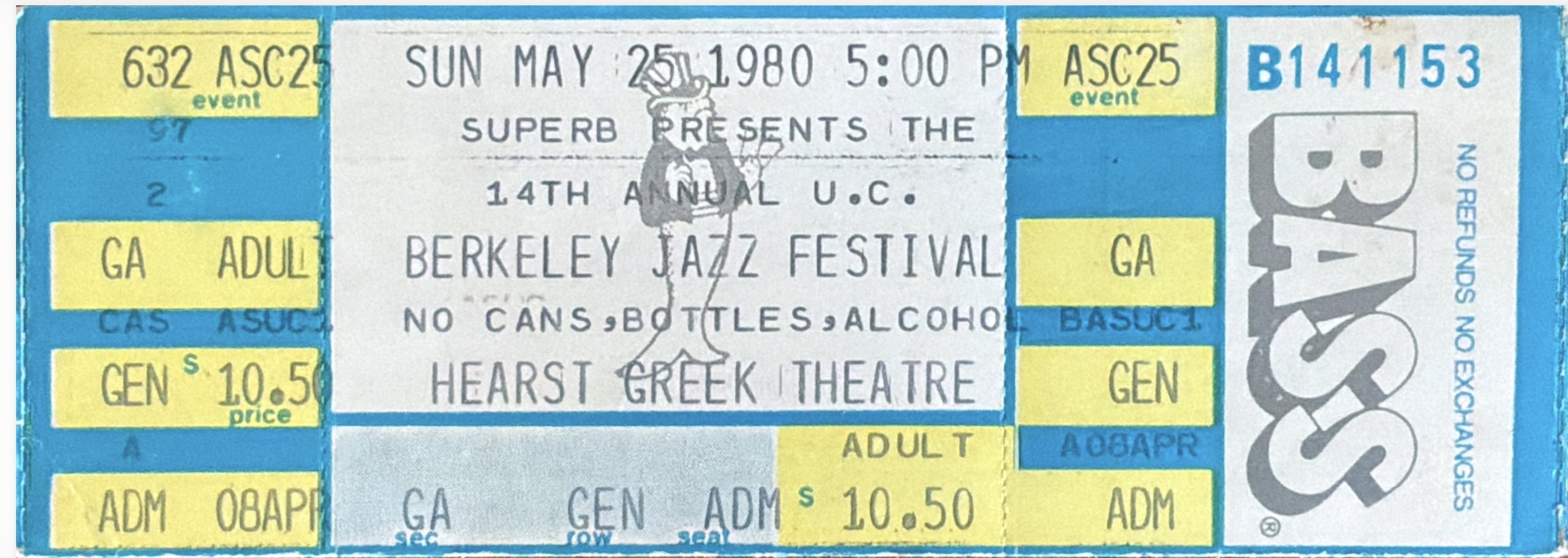
Concert ticket 1980

==== 1981 - The 15th Annual Berkeley Jazz Festival ====
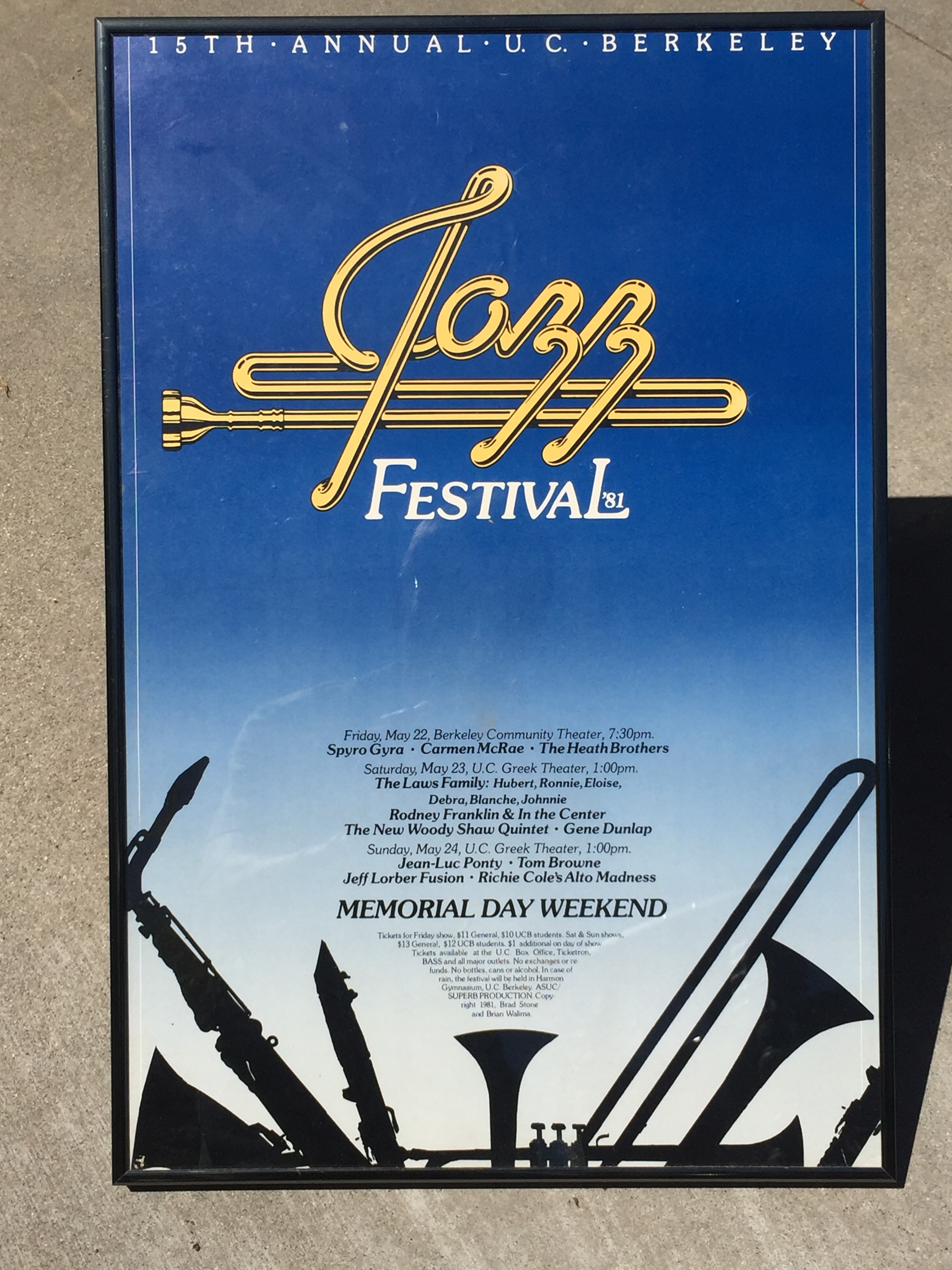
Berkeley Jazz Festival - poster for 1981

==== 1982 - The 16th Annual U.C. Berkeley Jazz Festival (A SUPERB/ASUC Production) ====
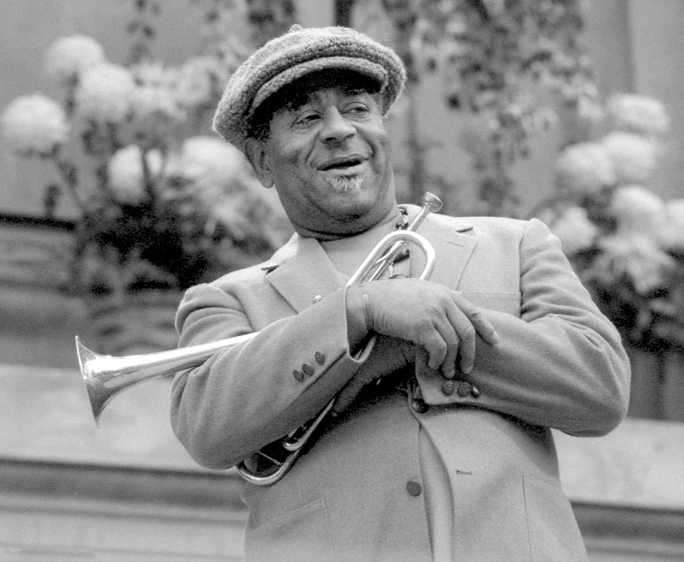
Dizzy Gillespie at UC Berkeley Jazz Festival, Greek Theater 1982

Friday, May 28: Elvin Jones & the Jazz Machine - Benny Carter Jazz All Stars (with George Bohanon, Snooky Young, Llew Matthews, Richard Reid, Paul Humphrey) - Mark Murphy

Saturday, May 29: McCoy Tyner and Friends with guest vocalist Phyllis Hyman - Freddie Hubbard All Stars featuring Bobby Hutcherson and Joe Henderson - Ray Barretto Orchestra with guest soloist Dizzy Gillespie - Full Faith & Credit Big Band

Sunday, May 30: Jean-Luc Ponty - Max Roach Quartet - Flora Purim & Airto with Joe Farrell - Free Flight

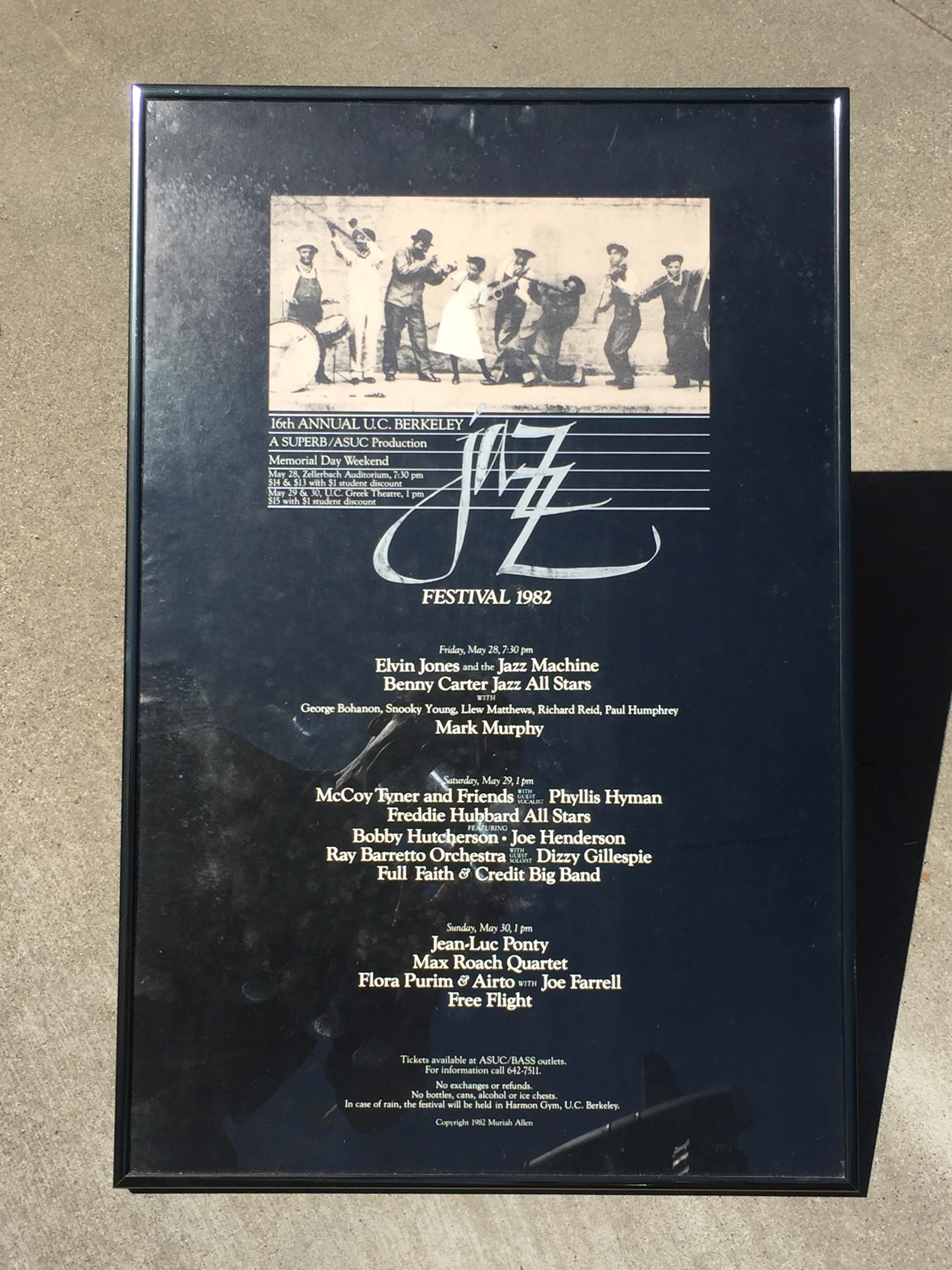
Berkeley Jazz Festival - poster for 1982

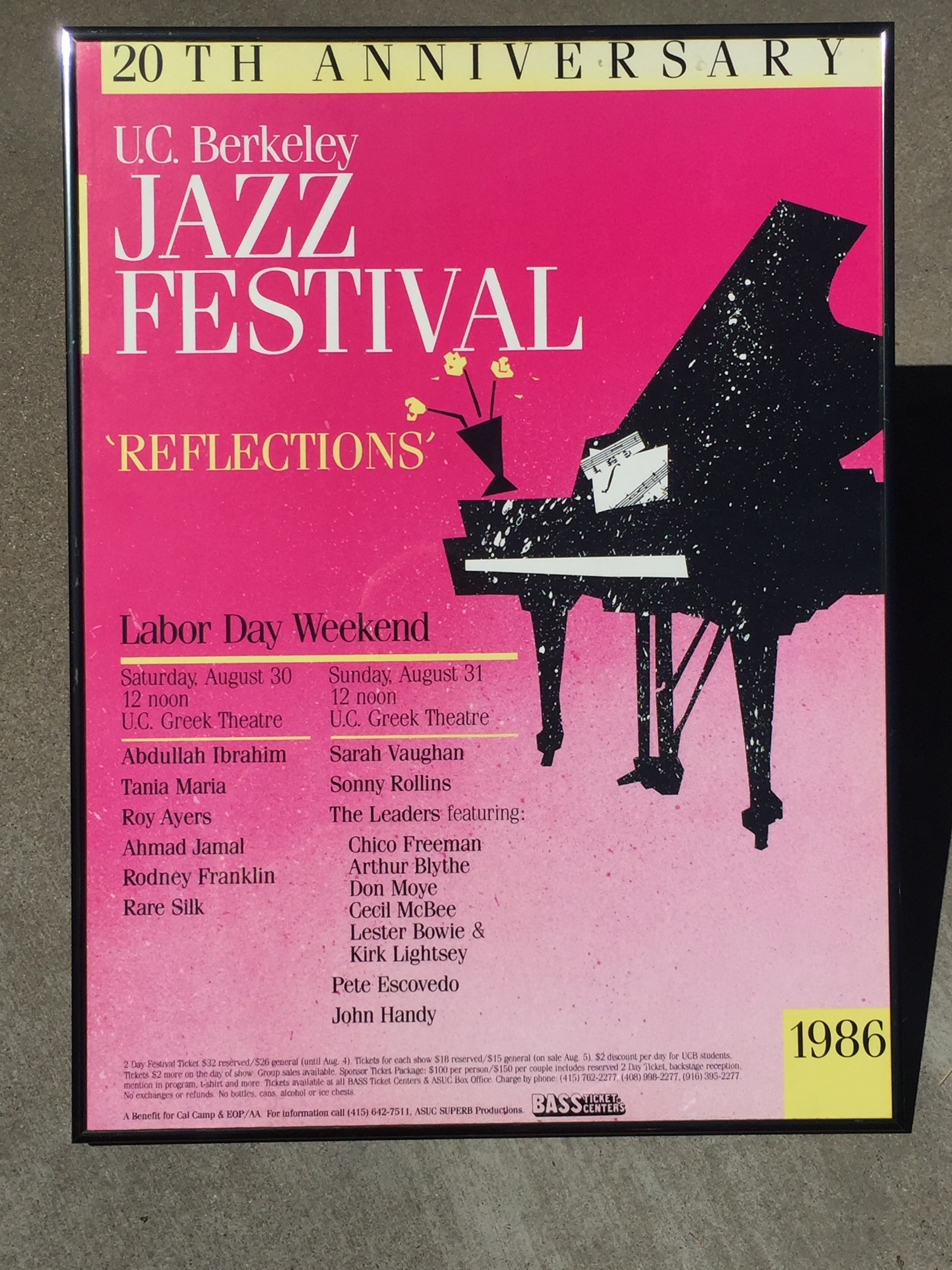
Berkeley Jazz Festival - poster for 1986

==== 1986 ====
August 29–31.

=== Another Planet Entertainment ===
==== 2005 ====
Rachelle Ferrell, Lalah Hathaway, Unwrapped All-Stars, Ray Obiedo & the Urban Latin Jazz Project, Mimi Fox, Bobby Caldwell, Boney James, and Kem.

==== 2006 ====
Performers included Chaka Khan, Will Downing, George Duke & Stanley Clarke, Norman Brown, Poncho Sanchez Latin Jazz Band, and Pieces of a Dream

==== 2007 ====
A line-up featuring Rachelle Ferrell, Arlington Houston, Joe Sample & Randy Crawford, Brian Culbertson, Najee, the Superstars of Jazz Fusion starring Roy Ayers, Jean Carne, Lonnie Liston Smith, Jon Lucien and Wayne Henderson.

==== 2008 ====
Kenny G, Will Downing, Brian Culbertson, The Escovedo Family featuring: Pete Escovedo, Sheila E. plus Juan and Peter Michael Escovedo Maysa Leak

== See also ==
- List of San Francisco Bay Area festivals and fairs
