= Belcampo =

Defunct food store in California

Belcampo Meat Co.
- Company type: Private
- Founded: 2012; 14 years ago in Mount Shasta, California
- Founder: Todd Robinson and Anya Fernald
- Defunct: October 18, 2021
- Headquarters: United States

Belcampo Meat Co. was an American food company founded in 2012, and situated at Mount Shasta, California. It was a farm to a door butcher shop that included its own farm, slaughterhouse and restaurants. although later it expanded sourcing to other farms.

== Background ==
Belcampo was led by its co-founder Anya Fernald from 2012 to 2020, and with Garry Embleton as co-CEO from 2020 until January 2021 when Embleton became the sole CEO. The company struggled during the COVID-19 pandemic as various locations were closed. The company had a major issue in 2021 when an employee exposed poorly sourced products. In late 2021, the company was shut down by the board.

== Operations ==
The company operated a 20,000 square foot, USDA-approved multi-species slaughter facility designed by animal welfare expert Temple Grandin, and a nearby 27,000-acre (11,000 ha) farm, and opened its first store in Marin County in 2012. It expanded to also include butcher shops and restaurants in Los Angeles, Santa Monica, San Francisco, San Mateo, Oakland, and New York, and also sold meat through Erewhon Grocery Stores.

== Controversies ==
The USDA had begun investigations into Belcampo for various violations, including sanitation, safety, and labeling at their Siskiyou County plant. Inspections revealed poor hygiene, mislabeled meat, and operational failures.

In May 2021, a former employee Evan Reiner alleged that it had fraudulently labeled cuts of meat as produced by Belcampo when they had been sourced from other producers.

== Environmental impact ==
Belcampo was the first meat company in the United States to comprehensively audit its carbon sequestration.
