= Opera in the Park =

Concert in Leeds, England

Opera in the Park was an annual large-scale open-air concert in Leeds, West Yorkshire, England. It is held in the grounds of the Jacobean mansion Temple Newsam, and is followed the next day by Party in the Park, a pop concert, thus making double use of the work and expense involved in setting up the venue. It was said to be the largest free classical concert in the UK, but a charge for tickets was introduced in 2011 as a result of "extreme budget pressures" on the council. The programme comprises solos, chorus works and orchestral pieces from opera, and the concert usually ends with an encore of "Nessun Dorma", the aria popularised by its use as theme tune for the 1990 FIFA World Cup.

The event is presented by Leeds City Council, in partnership with Magic 828 radio station and the Yorkshire Post newspaper.

The 2009 event drew an audience of 50,000, and featured soprano Natasha Marsh, tenor Alfie Boe, The Hallé and Leeds Festival Chorus.

The event was cancelled in July 2014
