= Bay Area Indie Music Festival =

Music festival in San Francisco

- Genre: Alternative, rock, indie, hip-hop
- Dates: October 4, 2008
- Locations: San Francisco, California, United States
- Years active: 2007–present
- Founders: Joshua Carter/3 Udders Productions
- Website: www.bayareaindiefest.com

The Bay Area Indie Music Festival is an American music festival produced by 3 Udders Productions that happens every year in the San Francisco Bay Area. Founded in 2007, it was first held in Martinez, California at Waterfront Park. Relatively small in size it has moved to AT&T Park (parking lot A).

== History ==
The first Bay Area Indie Music Festival was held in Martinez, California. Their lineup included Sugarcult, Scissors For Lefty, Audrye Sessions, Push To Talk, Minipop, Immigrant, Overview, National Product, Elephone, The Frail, Cold Hot Crash, Goodbye Gadget, Panda, Bel Air Academy, Eskimo Joe, The Logan, and Project Greenfield. Poor Bailey and Stepsonday were scheduled to perform but both dropped off a few days before the festival.

== Bay Area Indie Music Festival 2008 ==
The 2008 Bay Area Indie Music Festival will be held at AT&T Park (parking lot A) in San Francisco, California, on October 4, 2008. No lineup has been announced yet.
