= Caltopia =

Annual festival at the University of California, Berkeley

Caltopia is a free, two-day college lifestyle festival that takes place annually at the University of California, Berkeley in the Recreational Sports Facility (RSF) and according to the organizers of the event is the largest college lifestyle festival in the United States.

The first Caltopia was started in 2003 as an opportunity to bring together local and national businesses, students, alumni, faculty, staff and community members from the Berkeley area. Each year approximately 100 sponsors and exhibitors and 30,000 students, faculty, and community supporters attend.

Since its inception, Caltopia has evolved into an annual rite of passage for Cal students to bond with friends, over food, games, and fun. Each year Caltopia is the first experience for new students who move into the Residence Halls and then head to Caltopia as the first event of Welcome Week. Additionally, Caltopia is often referred to as "The Two Greatest Days on Planet Earth" by its promoters and organizers.

== Naming ==
The name Caltopia combines the prefix 'Cal' derived from the abbreviation of California, as in University of California and the suffix 'topia' meaning in a place or location. However, Caltopia is strongly associated with connotations of a utopia of riches and opportunity characteristic of California.

== Numbering ==
Caltopia typically makes uses of Roman numerals rather than writing the year following Caltopia. As such, Caltopia VIII designates that Caltopia is entering its 8th year.
