= Eat Real Festival =

Food festival in Oakland, California, United States

Coordinates: 37.79512°N 122.27777°W

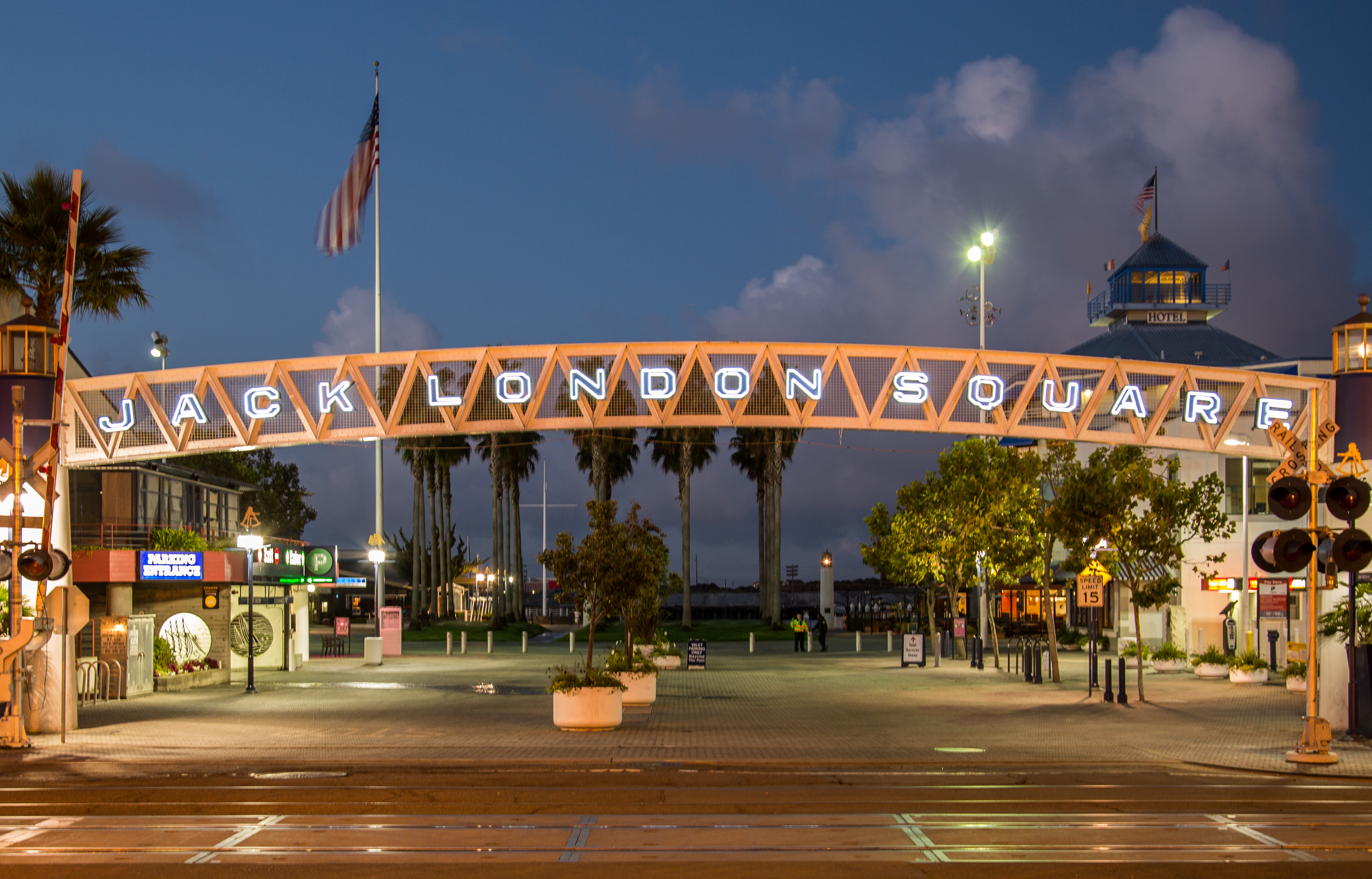
Photo of Jack London Square, primary location for the Eat Real Festival.

The Eat Real Festival was an annual celebration of food organized by Food Craft Institute; in Oakland, California. The festival focused on non-GMO, antibiotic-free food, and locally produced drinks made in a sustainable and organic manner. The festival typically included more than 70 vendors from across the state. Entry to the festival was free, and an estimated 150,000 people attended every year. In 2011, the Eat Real Festival was voted the best annual event in the readers' poll conducted by the East Bay Express for the Best of the Bay. All proceeds from the festival went to the Food Craft Institute. The festival was a combination of a block party and a street-food festival. Similar to state fairs, participants learned about the production of food, how it is made, and who makes it. The event focused on the recruitment of food vendors that are affordable while emphasizing fresh and local ingredients.

== History ==
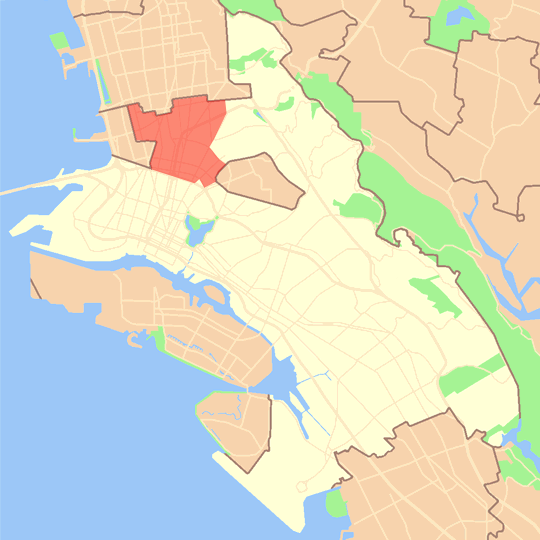
The Eat Real Festival is primarily held in Oakland, CA.

The festival was founded by the Food Craft Institute in 2008 to educate the public about how local food is grown, manufactured and prepared. The festival hosted Oakland-based food entrepreneurs in September for several years, including Blue Bottle Coffee, Hodo Soy, Burma Bear and Curry Up Now.

In 2019, it was held at the Jack London Square.

No festival was planned in 2020 as officials cited the COVID-19 pandemic as grounds for cancellation.

== Events ==
Events at the festival included performances from artists such as DJ Paul Gordon, DJ Aebi Dee, and DJ Sofa King Awesome. Workshops featured special culinary guests, including celebrities such as Anya Fernald, Thomas Bowman, and Chauncy Yarngo.

== Food ==
Vendors offered an assortment of street foods, such as Falafel, curry, grilled meats, ice cream, cheeses, pickles, jams, and Charcuterie. Styles of food that were served include Southern BBQ, Korean BBQ, Asian, Mexican, and Hawaiian. Between 60 and 70 vendors participated in the festival each year, and most dishes sold for $5 and under.
