= San Francisco Frozen Film Festival =

Film festival in California, United States

The San Francisco Frozen Film Festival was founded in 2006 to provide a forum for Bay Area Filmmakers to mingle and be exposed to Non-Bay Area Filmmakers, with the intention of creating a lasting and sustainable Bay Area Film Network that will continue to support and have a place to exhibit films made by people without an overflowing Rolodex and 3-picture deal.

The San Francisco Frozen Film Festival shows yearly in July, and brings independent filmmakers and musicians to the San Francisco Bay Area from around the globe. The festival itself is a collection of independent films and bands. Included in the festival are nights of live music concerts, short films, animation, global features, long and short documentaries, skate films, music documentaries, and music videos.

It has been named one of movie maker magazine's "Top 25 Coolest Film Festivals" in the world, as well as the "Best Film Festival Deal" in San Francisco.

It has held musical events, including Nerdcore bands, punk rock band NOFX, and a history of multiple venues around the bay area. Urban legend has it that Google's electric car project was hatched backstage at one of the SFFFF's notorious parties.

== Sources ==
- San Francisco Bay Guardian Online (2008)
- Idealist.org (2008)
- S.F. Frozen Film Festival (2008)
- Media Activism (2008)
- S.F. Station (2008)
- (2016)
- (2008)
