= Bay Area Circus Arts Festival =

The Bay Area Circus Arts Festival (formerly the Berkeley Juggling and Unicycling Festival) was an annual 3-day event in the San Francisco Bay Area of California, held by the Berkeley Juggling Collective. It featured workshops, casual instruction, and mini-competitions in various types of circus arts, including unicycling, hat-tossing, whip cracking, tumbling and multiple styles of juggling (contact, pin, diabolo, endurance, etc.). The event was free for everyone and many people learned to juggle or unicycle at the festival.

A highlight of the multi-day festival was its vaudeville-style variety show, featuring local, national and international artists performing in live stage performances. Past performances included acrobatics, hoop dancing, aerial/silk dance, puppeteering, as well as the arts featured in the festival.

Past festival dates:

- 2014-10-03-2014-10-05, festival webpage 2014
- 2013-10-04-2013-10-06, festival webpage 2013
- 2012-08-17–2012-08-19, festival webpage 2012
- 2010-07-09–2010-07-11, festival webpage 2010
- 2009-09-18–2009-09-20, festival webpage 2009
- 2008-10-10–2008-10-12, festival webpage 2008
- 2007-10-05–2007-10-07, festival webpage 2007
- 2006-09-29–2006-10-01, festival webpage 2006
- 2005-10-07–2005-10-09, festival webpage 2005
