= Kazuha Oda =

Japanese singer-songwriter

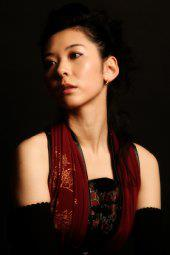

Background information
- Also known as: Kazha
- Born: Kazuha Oda; Japan
- Genres: Classic, Pop, Rock, heavy metal
- Occupations: Vocalist, songwriter, composer, bassist
- Instruments: Vocals, bass, piano
- Years active: 2001–present
- Member of: Kazha
- Website: www.kazha.net

Kazuha Oda is a classically trained singer/singer-songwriter born in Japan. She started out as a solo singer and has worked with wide variety of performers including Grammy winner Bob James. She worked on numerous projects including: 7 albums, 5 singles, and contributed to over 10 compilation albums ranging from Classic to Heavy Metal music until now. Much of her work has appeared on the iTunes top 100 around the world.

In the beginning of 2009, Kazuha started her rock band Kazha, and has been touring nationally with the band since then. They have appeared at numerous festivals and conventions including Colorado Dragon Boat Festival and Phoenix Comicon. Their music often appear on the Top Chart on CDBaby Hard Rock and Heavy Metal category.

== Bass ==
Kazuha has been an endorser of ESP Guitars since 2018, and playing her Artist Model Guitar.

== Discography ==
=== Kazha ===
- Dakishimete -Single- (2024)
- Reflection -Acoustic Album (2022)
- Kazha (2018)
- Evolution (2013)
- I Still Remember -Single version- (2010)
- Overture (2010)
- Breathe Through Your Dreams (2009)
