= Josey Montana McCoy =

American voice actor

- Born: Inez, Kentucky, U.S.
- Education: University of Kentucky (BA)
- Occupation: Voice actor
- Years active: 2020–present
- Spouse: Josie Adams McCoy (m. 2017)
- Website: https://www.joseymontanamccoy.com

Josey Montana McCoy is an American voice actor. He is best known as the English voice of Kaeya Alberich in Genshin Impact, Quizz in Batwheels on Cartoon Network and portraying Steve Rogers in Rogers: The Musical.

== Biography ==
McCoy grew up in the small Appalachian town of Inez, Kentucky. His summers were spent on an outdoor stage near his home called Jenny Wiley Theatre where he fell in love with performing. He graduated with a BA in journalism and theatre minor from the University of Kentucky. Soon thereafter he moved to Los Angeles and is heavily involved in the LA theater scene, including his work at Disney California Adventure as Olaf in Frozen - Live at the Hyperion and Steve Rogers in Rogers: The Musical. He voices Kaeya Alberich in Genshin Impact, Kaie Ono in NEO: The World Ends with You and Quizz in Batwheels on HBO Max & Cartoonito.

== Filmography ==
=== Television ===
- Batwheels: Quizz

=== Film ===
- Monster High: Freaky Fusion - Neighthan Rot, Victor Frankenstein
- Ever After High: Way Too Wonderland - Chase Redford

=== Game ===
- Genshin Impact - Kaeya Alberich
- Lost Judgment - Additional voices
- Neo: The World Ends with You - Kaie Ono
- Sand Land - Additional voices
