= Asian Heritage Street Celebration =

The Asian Heritage Street Celebration was an annual Asian American event held every May in San Francisco, California, beginning in 2005. The Street Celebration was originally organized by the non-profit AsianWeek Foundation, in cooperation with dozens of organizations in the Asian American community. The event was free.

For the first few events, the location of the street fair rotated each year, to showcase the different Asian enclaves in San Francisco. The first celebration highlighted the Japanese community and took place in Japantown, drawing 50,000 people. In 2006, the event showcased the Chinese community on Irving Street. In 2007, the celebration highlighted the Filipino community in the downtown South of Market area. The 2012, 2014, and 2015 events were held on Larkin and McAllister Streets, in the city's Little Saigon neighborhood. There was no event in 2017, but it returned in May 2018, again on Larkin Street, presented by the Chinese Culture Center.
