= Rick Farmiloe =

American animator

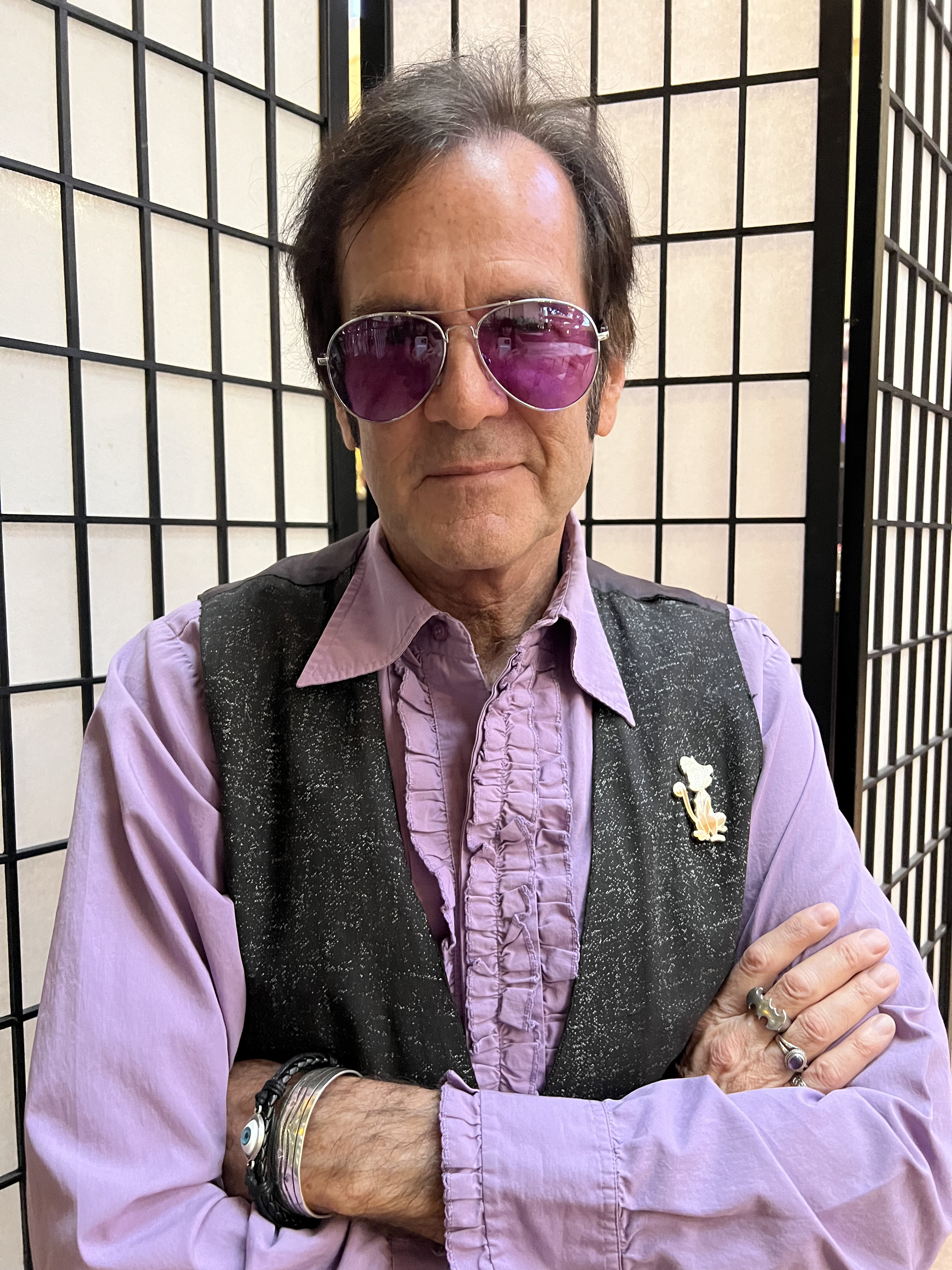
- Farmiloe at Mouse-Con November 2022
- Born: December 28, 1956 (age 69)
- Occupation: Animator
- Years active: 1981–present
- Employer: Walt Disney Animation Studios

Rick Farmiloe (born December 28, 1956) is an American animator and sequence director who has worked for various studios, including Walt Disney Animation Studios, Rich Animation Studios and DreamWorks.

== Shorts, commercials, etc. ==
- Kung Fu Panda 2 – Animated short for DreamWorks DVD

November 2010 – March 2011 20 min.

- How To Train Your Dragon – Animated short for DreamWorks DVD

March 2010 – June 2010 12 min.

- Mickey Mouse Cruise Line Spot

January 2010 – February 2010

- The Princess and the Frog

May 2009 – present

- Timon and Pumbaa: Water Safety

January 2009

- Snoopy Commercials

2008 – 2010

- Kung Fu Panda (Secrets of the Furious Five)

May – July 2008

- Brian Wilson Project

2007–2008

- Timon and Pumbaa: Safety Smart

December 2007

== Television ==
Stage
| Year | Series | Role | Animation Role |
|---|---|---|---|
| 1980 | The Tom and Jerry Comedy Show | Animator | |
| 1980 | Fat Albert and the Cosby Kids | Storyboard director/writer | Episode: "The Secret" |
| 1980–1982 | The Tarzan/Lone Ranger/Zorro Adventure Hour | Animator | 28 episodes |
| 1981 | The Kid Super Power Hour with Shazam! | Animator | |
| 1981 | Blackstar | Animator | 13 episodes |
| 1986 | Ghostbusters | Animator | 65 episodes |
| 1986–1987 | She-Ra: Princess of Power | Animator | 28 episodes |
| 1993 | Animated Hero Classics | Character layout artist | 1 episode |
| 2002 | House of Mouse | Animator | Los Angeles |
| 2004 | All Grown Up! | Animation timer | |
| 2005 | Camp Lazlo | Storyboard director/writer | 5 episodes |
| 2006 | Squirrel Boy | Assistant animator | |
| 2010 | Rick's Martini Bar | Director | |
| 2011 | Family Guy | Animator | Fight sequence for Drudog |
| 2016 | Bordertown | Storyboard revisionist | Episode: "Megachurch" |
| 2017–2019 | Creature Features | Self | 3 episodes |
| 2020 | InHouse-CON | Self | 2 episodes |
| 2021 | SpongeBob SquarePants | Animator | |
| 2021–2023 | Helluva Boss | Animator | 6 episodes |

== Film ==
Stage
| Year | Film | Role | Animation Role |
|---|---|---|---|
| 1981 | The Fox and the Hound | Assistant Animator | |
| 1982 | The Secret of NIMH | Assistant Animator | |
| 1985 | The Black Cauldron | Assistant Animator | |
| 1986 | The Great Mouse Detective | Character Animator | "Basil", "Toby", and "Dawson" |
| 1987 | Pinocchio and the Emperor of the Night | Assistant Animator | |
| 1988 | Oliver and Company | Character Animator | "Einstein", and "Roscoe and DeSoto" |
| 1988 | Not Since Casanova | Animator | |
| 1989 | Happily Ever After | Animator | |
| 1989 | The Little Mermaid | Character Animator | "Scuttle" |
| 1990 | The Rescuers Down Under | Character Animator | "Wilbur" |
| 1991 | Beauty and the Beast | Animator | "Lefou" |
| 1992 | Aladdin | Animator | "Abu" |
| 1994 | The Swan Princess | Supervising Animator | "Puffin" |
| 1998 | The Prince of Egypt | Supervising Animator | "The Camel" |
| 1999 | The Iron Giant | Animator | Signature Edition |
| 2000 | The Road to El Dorado | Animator | "Tulio" |
| 2001 | Shrek | Story Artist | |
| 2001 | Mickey's Magical Christmas: Snowed in at the House of Mouse | Assistant Animator | |
| 2002 | The Wild Thornberrys Movie | Storyboard Artist | |
| 2003 | Rugrats Go Wild | Sequence Director | |
| 2006 | Curious George | Animator | |
| 2006 | Elf Bowling: The Great North Pole Elf Strike (aka Mrs. Miracle the Movie) | Animation Director | |
| 2007 | The Simpsons Movie | Character Layout Artist | |
| 2009 | The Princess and the Frog | Additional Animator | |
| 2011 | Sid the Science Kid Movie | Animator | (release TBA) |
| 2011 | Tom and Jerry & The Wizard of Oz | Character Layout and Animation | |
| 2012 | The Boxtrolls | 2-D facial animator | |
| 2015 | Madea's Tough Love | Storyboard Artist | |
| 2016 | Norm of the North | Storyboard Assistant | |
| 2016 | Blood Father | Storyboard Artist: Additional Photography | |
| 2016 | Tom & Jerry: Back to Oz | Character Layout and Animation | |
| 2017 | Tom and Jerry: Willy Wonka and the Chocolate Factory | Character Layout and Animation | |
| 2018 | The Lady and the Tiger | Animator | |
| 2023 | The Brave Locomotive | Animator | |
| TBA | Hullabaloo | Animator | |

== Video games ==
Stage
| Year | Series | Role | Animation Role |
|---|---|---|---|
| 1996 | Tonka Construction | Animator | |

== Music videos ==
- Susan Egan "Nina Doesn't Care" (2011)
- Robert Schwartzman "Funny Money" (2011)
- Rooney "Holdin' On" (2011)
- Rooney "I Can't Get Enough" (2010)
- Paula Abdul "Opposites Attract" (1989)
