= Dutch jazz =

Music genre

Dutch jazz refers to the jazz music of the Netherlands. The Dutch traditionally have a vibrant jazz scene as shown by the North Sea Jazz Festival as well as other venues.

== History ==
=== Early period ===
In the Netherlands jazz began around 1919 to 1921. In the early thirties Paul Whiteman and Duke Ellington would perform in the nation sparking further interest. By the late 1930s the Dutch jazz group The Ramblers performed with Coleman Hawkins among others. The AVRO employed the Dutch Dick Willebrandts between 1937 and 1940 as a pianist with the AVRO Dance Orchestra the bandleader of which was the clarinetist Hans Mossel. Willebrandts also wrote arrangements for the AVRO Dance Orchestra.

Still there was some discomfort with the jazz clubs and fear the musicians would be corrupting on Dutch women. In addition to that the staffs were often Surinamese and racial aspects came into play at times. The clubs also had Surinamese musicians like Teddy Cotton.

=== The occupation and WWII ===
At first jazz in the Netherlands was not curtailed by Nazi Germany's occupation. In 1940 the US was not yet at war with Germany so the music was given a degree of freedom. Still restrictions on Jewish musicians had some effect and caused the Ramblers to fire several musicians. In some cases, however, Dutch jazz musicians aided Nazi propaganda at this point.

In March 1941 the Nazis took over the control of the Dutch radio and the AVRO Dance Orchestra was forced to disband. However, Willebrandts was able to continue to perform for the Dutch radio. In 1942 he was able to form a big band, Dick Willebrandts and His Dance Orchestra, which became one of the most popular jazz big bands in the Netherlands. Recordings were made by Decca Records, the label who also sponsored his concert tours in the Netherlands.

The situation began to deteriorate in 1941 as the war with the Soviet Union and then the United States led to restrictions. At first this limited them to performing in theatres and prohibited English-language names for bands. In time groups were forbidden to use the word "jazz" and restrictions grew severe. In some cases musicians adjusted by switching to Polynesian music, but in the case of Jewish musicians life became perilous. Later there would also be repressions of the Surinamese jazz musicians for being "Non-Aryan".

=== Post-war ===
Dutch jazz musicians had reflected Americans before the war and this continued to varying degrees until the late 1950s. In the 1970s jazz gained acceptance in Rotterdam, Amsterdam, and government funding. Since then many jazz musicians choose the Netherlands as a place to study or settle. Examples of this include Sean Bergin, Cab Kaye, Wilbur Little, and Michael Moore.

=== Styles ===
Dutch jazz includes various styles although avant garde and European free jazz has been significant in the last few decades. In addition to that trad jazz and smooth jazz, the latter perhaps exemplified by Candy Dulfer, also has many adherents. The Netherlands is also home to Stochelo Rosenberg, one of the leading living figures in Gypsy jazz.

The VPRO/Boy Edgar Award is a jazz award from the Netherlands. This prize is given to an individual that must have made significant contributions to the Dutch jazz scene over a significant period of time. In 2008 the prize was given to Pierre Courbois.

== Musicians ==
- Rob Agerbeek - pianist
- Peter Beets - pianist
- Han Bennink - Percussionist
- Bert Boeren - Trombonist
- Michiel Borstlap - Pianist and composer
- Michiel Braam - Pianist and bandleader
- Willem Breuker - Bandleader and saxophonist
- Bert van den Brink (nl) - Pianist and composer/arranger
- Glenn Corneille - Pianist
- Pierre Courbois - Drummer
- Hans Dulfer - Saxophonist
- Candy Dulfer - Saxophonist (Hans Dulfer's daughter)
- Max Geldray - Harmonica, comedy
- Hein van de Geyn - Double Bassist
- Maarten van der Grinten (de) - Guitarist
- Richard Hallebeek - Jazz-fusion
- Benjamin Herman (Saxophonist) (de)
- Jasper van 't Hof - Pianist and bandleader
- John Hondorp - Organist
- Yuri Honing - Saxophonist
- Ilse Huizinga - Singer
- Wessel Ilcken (de) (nl) - Drummer
- Eric Ineke - Drummer
- Greetje Kauffeld - Singer
- Tim Kliphuis - Violinist
- Frits Landesbergen - Drummer
- Erik van der Luijt - Pianist
- Rob Madna (nl) - Pianist and composer/arranger
- Willem van Manen (de) (nl)- Trombonist, composer, Big Band leader
- Johnny Meijer - Accordionist (folk and jazz)
- Misha Mengelberg - Pianist and composer
- Hans Mossel - Clarinetist, saxophonist and band leader
- Piet Noordijk (de) (nl) - Saxophonist
- Wim Overgaauw (nl) (de) - Guitarist
- Tony Overwater (de) (nl) - Bassist
- Lodewijk Parisius - Dutch/Surinamese tenor saxophonist
- Rita Reys - Singer
- Ernst Reijseger - Cellist
- Han Reiziger (nl) - Pianist
- Marc van Roon (nl) - Pianist
- Toon Roos (de) - Saxophonist
- Stochelo Rosenberg - Guitarist
- Jesse van Ruller (de) (nl) - Guitarist
- Paulus Schäfer (nl)- Guitarist
- Marzio Scholten - Guitarist
- Cees Slinger (de) - Pianist
- Jelle van Tongeren - Violinist
- Joe Vanenkhuizen - Accordionist saxophonist and composer
- Nelly Verschuur (nl) - Singer
- Eric Vloeimans - Trumpeter
- Wolter Wierbos - Trombonist
- Dick Willebrandts - Piano and big band leader
- Diederik Wissels - Piano

=== Bands ===
- Amsterdam Jazz Quintet - Modern Jazz.
- Bik Bent Braam - Experimental big band
- Clusone Trio - Modern jazz, free improvisation
- Dick Willebrandts and His Dance Orchestra
- Dutch Swing College Band - Dixieland revival
- New Cool Collective (nl) - Edison Award winners
- Johnny & Jones (nl)
- The Ploctones (nl)
- The Ramblers (nl) - Early Dutch jazz band and the longest surviving big band according to the Guinness World Records
- Rosenberg Trio
- The Skymasters (nl) - 1940s Big band
- Tzigane Swing - Student Jazz Orchestra
- Nillihc - acid jazz
- MARUTYRI - jazz fusion

== See also ==
- Jazz in Belgium
