= Dick Willebrandts =

Dutch pianist and composer (1911–1970)

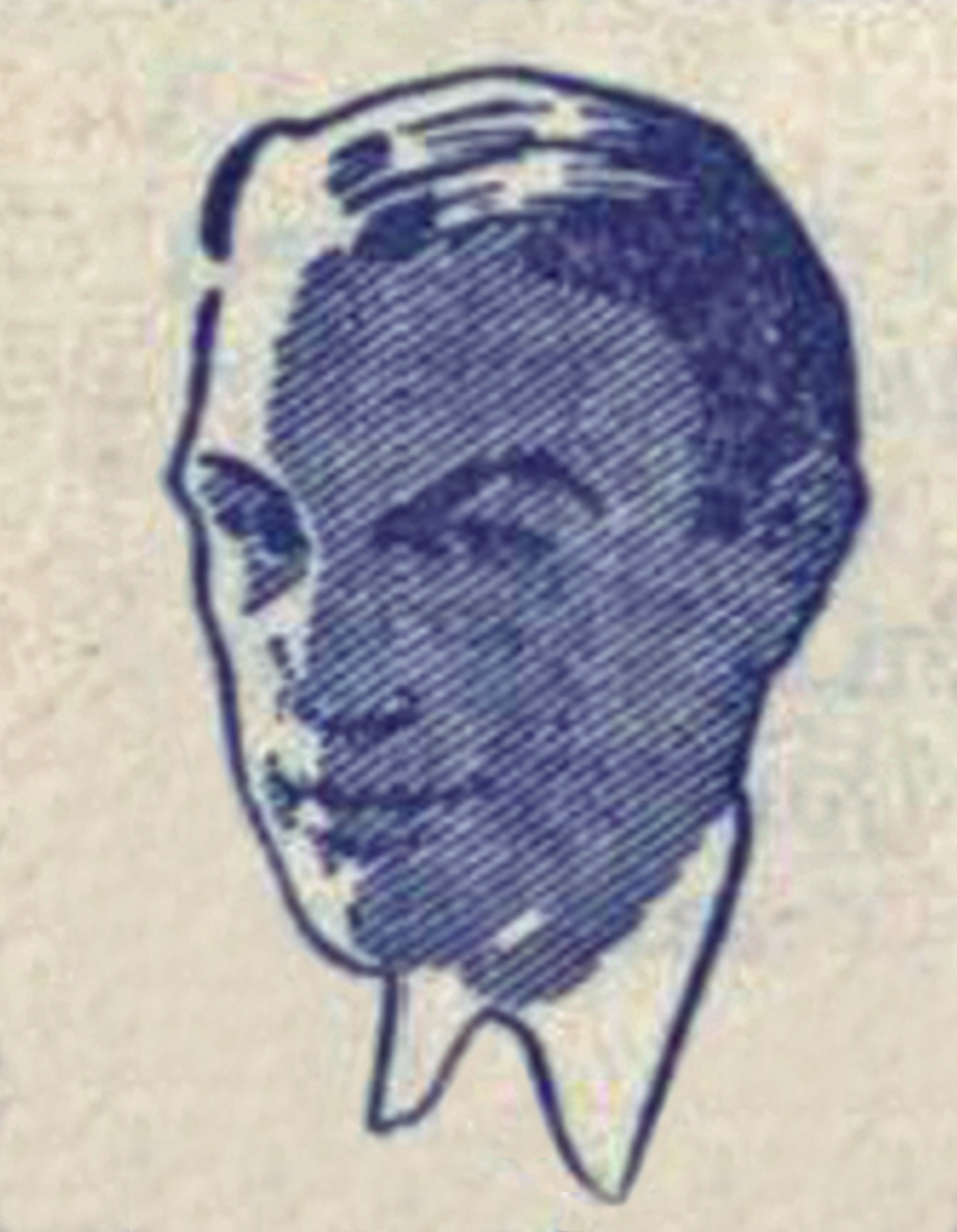
- Dick Willebrandts, 1943.

Background information
- Born: Dick Abraham Willebrandts; July 29, 1911; Rotterdam, Netherlands
- Died: December 29, 1970 (aged 59) Rotterdam, Netherlands
- Genres: Jazz; swing
- Occupations: bandleader; composer; pianist
- Instrument: Piano
- Years active: 1925–1963
- Label: Decca Records

Dick Abraham Willebrandts (Rotterdam, 29 July 1911 – 29 December 1970) was a Dutch pianist, composer and bandleader in the swing era.

== Early life and career ==
The son of Dirk Willebrandts and Sara Bongers, Dick Willebrandts was born in Rotterdam, Netherlands. He married Maria Margaretha Lucas on 9 October 1935.

In 1925 Dick Willebrandts started his career as a pianist in the sextet set up by his brother Philip Willebrandts, for whom he wrote several arrangements. Around 1928 Willebrandts became a member of German and Danish big bands who performed in the Netherlands. Between 1935 and 1937 Willebrandts was a pianist with “The Internationals”, a big band formed by Jack de Vries (1906-1976) and his brother the jazz trumpeter Louis de Vries (1905-1935). Louis died in a car crash in 1935.

From 1937 to 1940 Willebrandts was employed by the Dutch broadcaster AVRO as a pianist with the AVRO Dance Orchestra, the band leader of which was Hans Mossel. Willebrandts also wrote arrangements for the AVRO Dance Orchestra.

== World War II ==
When Nazi Germany invaded the Netherlands on 10 May 1940, the AVRO Dance Orchestra was forced to disband. Willebrandts continued to perform for the Dutch radio from 1940 to 1942. In 1942 he found a sponsor who helped him to form a big band: Dick Willebrandts and His Dance Orchestra. Recordings were made by Decca Records, the label that also sponsored his concert tours in the Netherlands.

As the war continued the big bands had to commit to a special repertoire in order to be allowed to perform before an audience. Each big band had to be a member of the Nederlandsche Kultuurkamer, the Dutch equivalent of the German Reich Chamber of Culture, a government agency in Nazi Germany that was extended to the occupied territories. A rejected inscription resulted in an occupational ban. The Nederlandsche Kultuurkamer played an important role in the Nazi oppression of modern art and music that was considered "degenerate art", such as American jazz and swing music. This supposedly "degenerate music" was much more popular with the public than the Nazis thought.

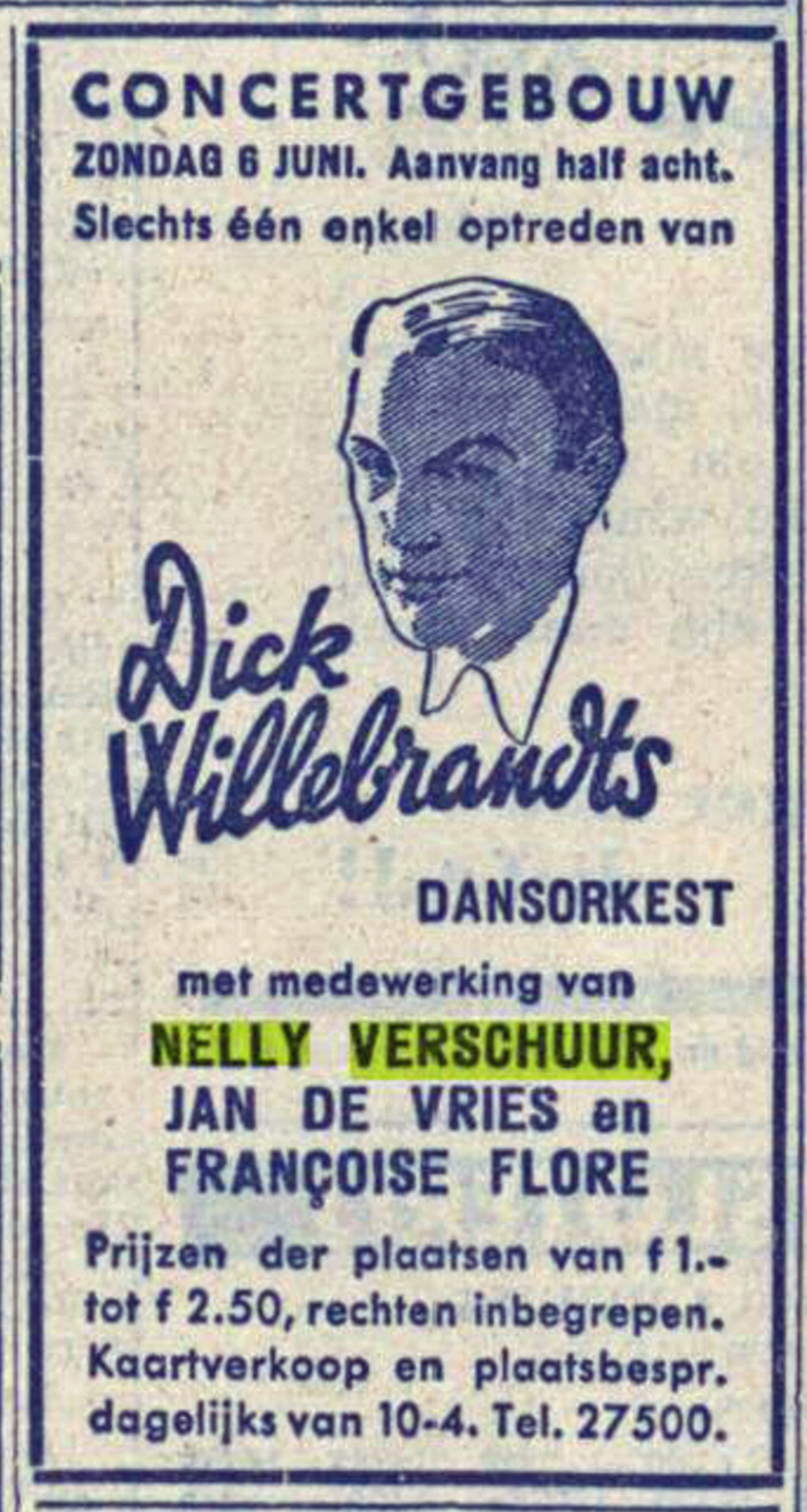
Advertisement in the Algemeen Handelsblad, 5 June 1943, announcing a concert on 6 June 1943.

Among the members of Willebrandts' big band were Wim Kroon (bass), Aldert Dekker (drums), Bep Rowold, Cees Verschoor, Tinus and Kees Bruyn (saxophone), Tony van Hulst (guitar), Kees van Dorsser, Francis Bay en Frans van der Meer (brass instruments). Willebrandts himself played the piano. Trombonist, composer and arranger Pi Scheffer played the trombone in Willebrandts’ big band. Dick Willebrandts and his band blended jazz and entertainment.

The vocalists were Jan de Vries and Nelly Verschuur. During World War II Nelly Verschuur was very successful, especially with two songs both written by Jaap Valkhoff: “Diep in mijn hart” (“Deep in My Heart”) (1943) and “Denk je nog aan die tijd' (“Do You Remember Those Days”) (1943). Both songs were recorded between August and December 1943 in Hilversum for the Deutsche Europasender (D.E.S.) in Studio B of the Dutch Broadcasting Corporation. Nelly Verschuur also sang the English version “Deep in my Heart”.

Dick Willebrandts’ big band often performed for the by the Nazis controlled Dutch radio. From August 1943 until September 1944 several recordings were made for propaganda purposes which were broadcast via the broadcaster Calais II, the new name of the Dutch radio station Hilversum II. Dick Willebrandts was "dienstverpflichtet" by the German occupiers to work for the Reichs-Rundfunk-Gesellschaft. It was agreed upon with the sixteen members of his orchestra that Dick Willebrandts and his orchestra would continue to play because they all had families to support. Calais II was part of the German Europasender during the Nazi regime, and the counterpart of the British black propaganda broadcaster Soldatensender Calais. After Mad Tuesday, September 5, 1944, the situation changed dramatically. Broadcasts had alleged that Breda had been liberated which caused rumours that the liberation of the occupied Netherlands by the Allied forces was at hand. Dick Willebrandts' big band was disbanded. Some musicians were arrested, others had to go in hiding, like Willebrandts himself. Dick Willebrandts gave financial help and shelter to two Jewish families in his family home in Rotterdam and in Hilversum so as to avoid their deportation during the Holocaust years.

== Later career ==
Nazi Germany was defeated between 4 and 8 May 1945 during which the remaining German armed forces surrendered unconditionally. This resulted in the liberation of the Netherlands on 5 May 1945. Now life became briefly difficult for Dick Willebrandts. Just like Theo Uden Masman, another famous Dutch big band leader of The Ramblers, who had equally played for the Germans during the occupation, Willebrandts was not allowed to lead a big band for a period of six months. During this time Willebrandts worked as a pianist in a bar in his home town of Rotterdam.

In 1947 Willebrandts was re-employed by the AVRO and in 1955 he once again became a band leader of an orchestra and a dixieland band.

In 1960 the trombonist and band leader Pi Scheffer asked Willebrandts to join the radio orchestra, the “OK Wobblers”. To honour Willebrandts the record label Grannyphone published in 1989 a cd “Dick Willebrandts and his Radio-Orchestra” with previously unrecorded numbers which Willebrandts had played for the Deutsche Europasender (D.E.S.) in 1943. This cd was rewarded with an Edison Award, an annual Dutch music award for outstanding achievements in the music industry.

== Retirement and death ==
In 1963 Dick Willebrandts had a heart attack of which he recovered, yet it ended his career. He died on 29 December 1970 as the result of a fatal heart attack.

== Discography ==
=== With the dance orchestra ===
- Wenteltrap (Spiral Stairs), May 1943.
- Ratten op zolder (Rats in the Attic), April 1944.
- Het komt wel weer in orde (Everything Will Be Alright), July 1943.

=== With Nelly Verschuur ===
- Diep in mijn hart (Deep in My Heart), 1943.
- Denk je nog wel eens aan dien tijd? (Do You Remember Those Days?), 1943.
- I Cover the Waterfront, 1943.

== External links and further reading ==
- Doctor Jazz Magazine and the Jazz Foundation Doctor Jazz, Traditional Jazz 1900-1955.
- Dick Willebrandts at AllMusic
- Jazz & Geimproviseerde Muziek in Nederland (Jazz & Improvised Music in the Netherlands), Wim van Eyle, Het Spectrum, 1978, p. 152.
