= Damir Kukuruzović =

Croatian jazz guitarist (1975–2020)

Damir Kukuruzović (20 August 1975 – 12 December 2020) was a Croatian jazz guitarist. He was the most famous Croatian representative of gypsy jazz.

== Biography ==
Born in Sisak, Kukuruzović was the founder of the Damir Kukuruzović Django Group, with whom he recorded several albums and played at numerous international jazz festivals. He also performed with musicians such as Stochelo Rosenberg, Paulus Schäfer, Angelo Debarre, Raphaël Faÿs, Ludovic Beier, Wawau Adler, Yorgui Loeffler, Joscho Stephan, Vlatko Stefanovski and Robin Nolan. In 2019 he recorded the hit Zoran pjeva Arsena with Zoran Predin.

He was also the founder-director of the Siscia Jazz Club and organizer of the Siscia Open Jazz & Blues Festival and other jazz festivals in Croatia. In 2011, Kukuruzović was awarded the prize for the most famous acoustic jazz guitarist in Croatia. In 2013 he was honored for exceptional guitar skills and the promotion of Croatian jazz music in the world.

In the election campaign for the 2011 Croatian parliamentary election, Kukuruzović supported the right-wing Croatian Party of Rights; in the election for the city council in Sisak in 2013, he stood as a candidate for their split-off Croatian Party of Rights Dr. Ante Starčević.

Kukuruzović died from COVID-19 on 12 December 2020, at age 45, during the COVID-19 pandemic in Croatia, after being hospitalized in Zagreb for several weeks.
