= Siergiej Wowkotrub =

Classical and jazz violinist, composer

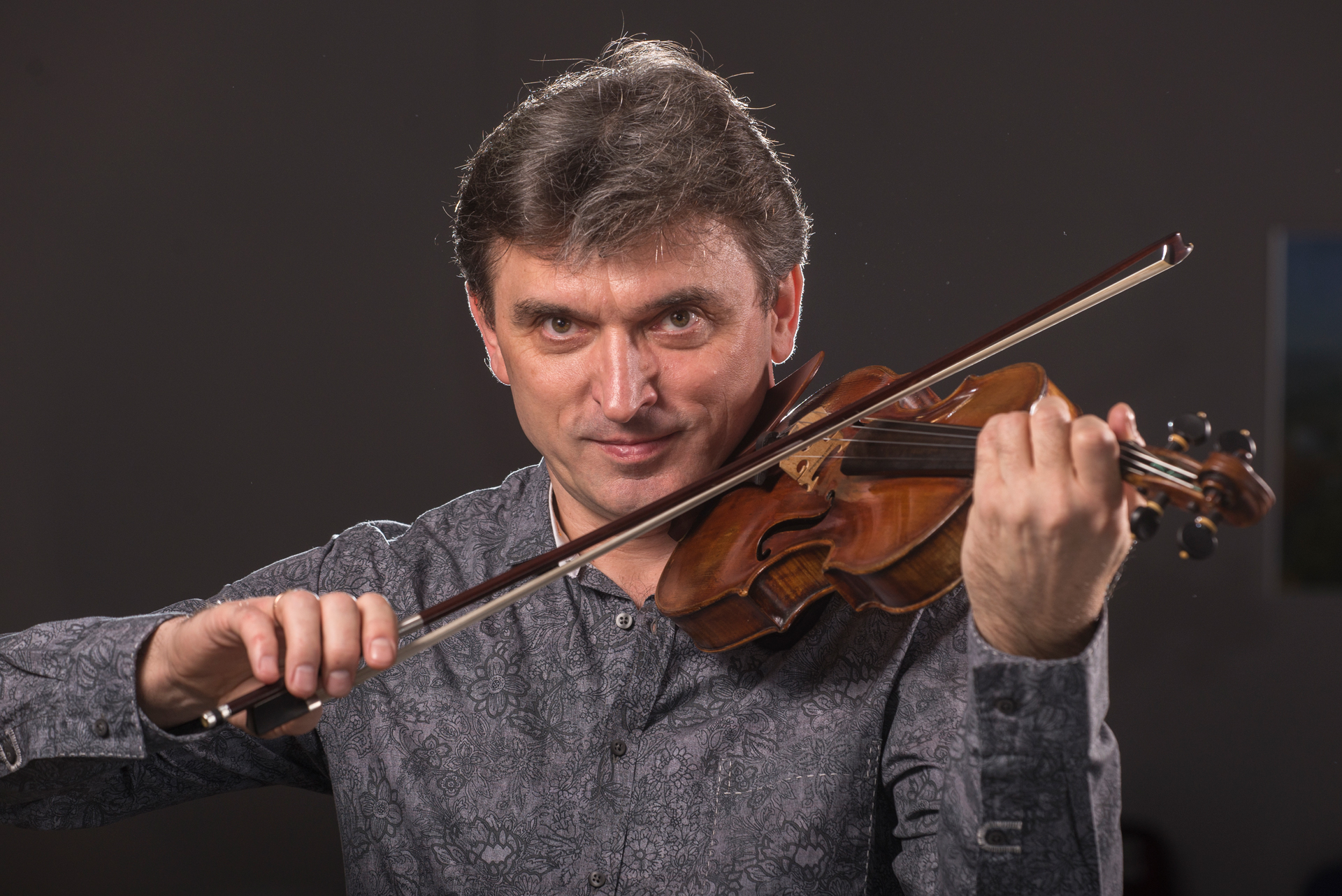
SW - photo by Marcin-Skabek

Siergiej Wowkotrub (1964 Ukraine) is a classical and jazz violinist, composer, and member of the Sergei Wowkotrub Gypsy Swing Quartet.

== Classical music, Poland ==
Wowkotrub is a graduate of the Tchaikovsky Music Conservatory in Kyiv, a student of professor A. I. Bazhenov. Although he began doctoral studies in Kyiv in the early 90s, he decided to go to Poland.

At the invitation of Jerzy Kosek, director of the Częstochowa Philharmonic Symphony Orchestra, Wowkotrub took a position with them as violinist. He was quickly promoted to first violin. Associated with Czestochowa professionally and privately, he has made Poland his second homeland.

== Siergiej Wowkotrub Trio ==
Wowkotrub an interest in traditional jazz in the conservatory. He listened to Leonid Utyosov, then discovered Stéphane Grappelli and violin gypsy swing. As a jazzman, he developed his skills with Maciej Strzelczyk and Wojtek Kaminski, then with Tim Kliphuis. Wowkotrub founded his first group, the Siergiej Wowkotrub Trio.

In 2007, Wowkotrub, Andrzej Nowicki and Daniel Pomorski recorded their first CD, Happy Times. It contained swing music from the 1920s and 1930s

== Siergeij Wowkotrub Gypsy Swing Quartet ==
In 2011, Wowkotrub started the Siergiej Wowkotrub Gypsy Swing Quartet (SWGSQ). With guitarists, Sebastian Ruciński, Tomasz Wójcik and contrabassist Piotr Górka, Wowkotrub created another CD. Joseph, Joseph” is an example of virtuoso interpretations of swing standards. The CD is dominated by the mood of Stephane Grappelli and Django Reinhardt. There are echoes of the Gypsy camp and in solo performances of the leader have heard east Slavic tunes and the discipline of academic education.

== Concerts, cooperation, solo recordings ==
In 2001-2015, Wowkotrub gave concerts in Poland, Germany, France, Belgium, Slovakia, and Hungary.

=== Guest artist recordings ===
- "Bix & Henryk" (2006)
- "New Orleans Suite" (2007)
- "Jubilee" - Five O'Clock Orchestra (2015)

=== Collaborations ===
- "Jazz Band Ball Orchestra" (Cracow)
- "Swing Workshop of Wojtek Kamiński" (Warsaw)
- "Five O'Clock Orchestra" (Czestochowa)
- "Hot D'Jazz Trio" (Cracow)
- Joscho Stephan (Mönchengladbach)
- – Lora Szafran (Warsaw)
- Tim Kliphuis (Hilversum)
- Vano Bamberger (Frankfurt)

=== Band leader ===
- Siergiej Wowkotrub Trio "Happy Times" (2007)
- SWGSQ "Joseph, Joseph" (2013)

== Achievements and awards ==
- first place in a competition "Debut in Traditional Jazz" organized by the Foundation Debut as an Author and the Ministry of Culture, Warsaw 10.11.2005
- “Golden Washboard" main prize at the traditional jazz competition Old Jazz Meeting, Iława 11–13.08.2006
- The Bronze Medal for Long Service awarded by the President of Poland, Warsaw 30.08.2010
- Honorary Badge for Service to Polish Culture by Polish Minister of Culture and Heritage, Warsaw 24.09.2014
