= Kukuruzović =

Kukuruzović is a surname. People with the surname include:

- Stjepan Kukuruzović, a Swiss footballer
- Damir Kukuruzović, a Croatian jazz guitarist
