= The New Al Grey Quintet =

Studio album by Al Grey
- Released: 1988
- Recorded: May 16 and 17, 1988
- Studios: Van Gelder Studio, Englewood Cliffs, NJ
- Genre: Jazz
- Length: 61:20
- Labels: Chiaroscuro; CR(D) 305
- Producer: Hank O'Neal

Al Grey chronology
Al Grey and Jesper Thilo Quintet (1986)	The New Al Grey Quintet (1988)	Al Meets Bjarne (1988)

The New Al Grey Quintet is an album by trombonist Al Grey which was recorded and released on the Chiaroscuro label in 1988.

== Reception ==
Professional ratings
Review scores
Source	Rating
AllMusic	4.5/5 stars
The Penguin Guide to Jazz Recordings	3/4 stars

The AllMusic review by Scott Yanow stated "The repertoire mixes together swing standards with lesser-known jazz tunes ... The relaxed straight-ahead music flows nicely and all of the musicians (other than Durham) have their opportunities to be featured. Worth searching for".

== Track listing ==
All compositions by Al Grey except where noted

1. "Bluish Grey" (Thad Jones) – 5:03
2. "Sonny's Tune" (Sonny Stitt) – 5:02
3. "Don't Blame Me" (Dorothy Fields, Jimmy McHugh) – 6:11
4. "Syrup and Biscuits" (Hank Mobley) – 5:48
5. "'Tain't No Use" (Al Cohn) – 5:19
6. "Al's Rose" – 3:09
7. "Night and Day" (Cole Porter) – 2:21
8. "Call It Whatchawanna" (Johnny Griffin) – 5:45
9. "Underdog" (Cohn) – 5:49
10. "Stompin' at the Savoy" (Edgar Sampson, Benny Goodman, Andy Razaf, Chick Webb) – 3:24
11. "Al's Blues" – 4:18
12. "Rue Prevail" (Art Farmer) – 6:34
13. "Soap Gets in Your Eyes" (Don Friedman) – 3:25

== Personnel ==
- Al Grey, Mike Grey – trombone
- Joe Cohn – guitar, trumpet
- J. J. Wiggins – bass
- Bobby Durham – drums
