= Joe Cohn =

American jazz guitarist (born 1956)

- Birth name: Joseph Mark Cohn
- Born: December 28, 1956 (age 68); Flushing, New York, U.S.
- Genres: Jazz
- Occupation: Musician
- Instrument: Guitar
- Years active: 1980s–present
- Website: joecohn.com

Joseph Mark Cohn (born December 28, 1956) is an American jazz guitarist.

== Career ==
The son of Al Cohn, he started to play the guitar in his teens, transcribing from recordings featuring Art Tatum, Thad Jones, and Clifford Brown. Besides taking lessons, he attended the Berklee College of Music in Boston, where he also played with Nick Brignola and Bob Mover. He is self-taught on double bass and performed with musicians at hotels in the Catskill Mountains. He continued to play bass in New York City with Freddy Cole and Buddy DeFranco. Beginning in 1984, he played guitar for several years in the Artie Shaw Orchestra led by Dick Johnson in addition to learning the trumpet. He recorded and toured with his father, saxophonist Al Cohn. In the 1990s, he was a member of the Carmen Leggio quartet with Bill Crow.

His daughter Shaye Cohn plays cornet with Tuba Skinny.

== Discography ==
=== As leader ===
- Two Funky People (Double-Time, 1997)
- Restless (Arbors, 2007)
- Shared Contemplations (Criss Cross, 2009)
- Fuego (Criss Cross, 2011)
- Marathon Man: The Emeryville Sessions Vol. 1 (Vegamusic, 2014)
- Sposin': The Emeryville Sessions Vol. 2 (2015)

=== As sideman ===
With Harry Allen

- Eu Nao Quero Dancar (I Won't Dance) (RCA Victor, 1998)
- Once Upon a Summertime (Novus, 1999)
- The Harry Allen Quartet (2003)
- Jazz for the Soul (McMahon, 2005)
- Down for the Count (Swingbros, 2007)
- Hits by Brits (Challenge, 2007)
- Perform Music from Guys and Dolls (Arbors, 2007)
- Stompin' the Blues (Arbors, 2008)
- The Harry Allen Quintet Plays Music from the Sound of Music (Arbors, 2011)

With Peter Beets

- New Groove (Criss Cross, 2007)
- Chopin Meets the Blues (Criss Cross, 2010)

With Bill Crow

- From Birdland to Broadway (Venus, 1996)
- Jazz Anecdotes (Venus, 1997)
- From Birdland to Broadway II (Venus, 2009)

With Buddy DeFranco

- Mr. Lucky (Pablo, 1984)
- Do Nothing Till You Hear from Us! (Concord Jazz, 1999)

With Al Grey

- The New Al Grey Quintet (Chiaroscuro, 1988)
- Fab (Capri, 1990)
- Live at the Floating Jazz Festival (Chiaroscuro, 1991)
- Christmas Stockin' Stuffer (Capri, 1992)
- Me 'n' Jack (Pullen, 1996)

With Jay Leonhart

- Cool (Sons of Sound, 2004)
- Fly Me to the Moon (Venus, 2004)

With Grant Stewart

- Grant Stewart + 4 (Criss Cross, 2005)
- Tenor and Soul (Videoarts, 2005)
- Estate (Videoarts, 2006)
- Recado Bossa Nova (2008)

With others

- Totti Bergh, Remember (Gemini, 1995)
- Al Cohn, Overtones (Concord Jazz, 1982)
- Kenny Davern & Joe Temperley, Live at the Floating Jazz Festival (Chiaroscuro, 2000)
- Bob Dorough, Too Much Coffee Man (Blue Note, 2000)
- George Gee, Setting the Pace (GJazz, 2004)
- Jesse Green, Lift Off (Chiaroscuro, 1993)
- Eddie Higgins, Moonlight Becomes You (Venus, 2003)
- Carmen Leggio, Carmen Leggio Quartet Featuring Joe Cohn (Mighty Quinn, 2007)
- Andy McGhee, Could It Be (Mags 1992)
- Dave McKenna, Daryl Sherman Jubilee (Arbors, 2000)
- Ken Peplowski, Easy to Remember (Nagel Heyer, 2004)
- Dayna Stephens, New Day: The Emeryville Sessions Vol 3 (Vegamusic, 2014)
- Doug Webb, Fabio Jegher, Warm Feelings (Getty, 2009)
- Frank Wess, Surprise! Surprise! (Gemini, 1994)
- Claude Williams, Swingin' the Blues (Bullseye, 2000)
