= Jozef Cleber =

Dutch conductor (1916-1999)

Jos Cleber
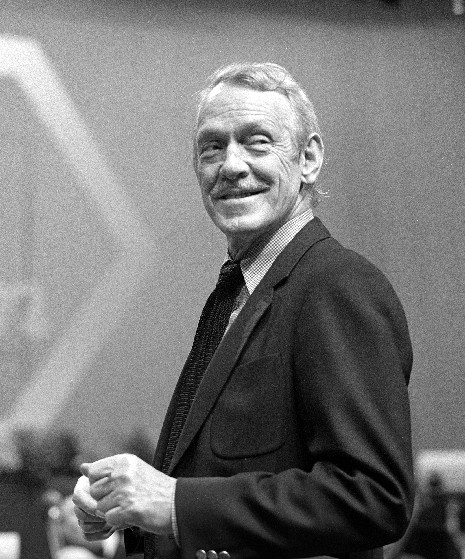
- Cleber in 1974

Background information
- Born: Jozef Cleber; 2 June 1916; Maastricht, Netherlands
- Died: 21 May 1999 (aged 82) Hilversum, Netherlands
- Genres: Classical; jazz
- Occupations: Musician; conductor; composer; arranger
- Instruments: Trombone; violin
- Years active: 1931–1981
- Labels: Phonogram; Chappell; Decca; His Master's Voice; Philips; Telefunken
- Formerly of: Cosmopolitain Orkest (Radio Batavia, later AVRO)

Jozef "Jos" Cleber (Dutch pronunciation: [ˈjoːzəf kleːˈbɛr]; 2 June 1916 – 21 May 1999) was a Dutch trombonist, violinist, conductor, composer, arranger, and producer.

He wrote numerous arrangements (notably to Heel de wereld, the Dutch Eurovision Song Contest entry in 1958) and conducted De Zaaiers, one of the orchestras of Dutch radio, and many recordings on the Phonogram label until he left for South Africa in 1962. However, he may be best known for orchestrating the Indonesian national anthem Indonesia Raya.

== Early life ==
Cleber was born in Maastricht, the youngest of eight children in the Roman Catholic family of Gerardus Josephus Cleber, the organist and choir conductor at the Basilica of Saint Servatius, and Anna Maria Bastian. His father gave him his first music lessons.

After high school, he attended the Maastricht Academy of Music, where he studied violin and piano, and at fifteen years old, he began playing viola with the Maastrichts Stedelijk Orkest. He later became fascinated by jazz and the music of Duke Ellington and thus chose to continue his studies at the Royal Conservatory of Liège in saxophone and clarinet. There he was advised to study trombone instead, because his lips were thought to be well suited for it.

== Career ==
=== Trombonist ===
Cleber completed his obligatory military service early so that he could join the jazz orchestra of Paul Godwin. During a performance with Godwin in 1936, he received a commission to play with the Tonhalle Orchester Zürich, where he remained until 1939, when the threat of World War II became too great. He returned to the Netherlands and began playing violin and trombone for the Tuschinski Theatre, Amsterdam, under the direction of Max Tak.

=== World War II ===
Cleber came into contact with AVRO, a Dutch public broadcaster, and in 1940, he joined their orchestra as a trombonist under the direction of Elzard Kuhlman. A year later, this orchestra became part of the Groot Amusementsorkest of the Nazi-organised Nederlandsche Omroep, and in 1942, by virtue of obligatory membership in the Nederlandsche Kultuurkamer, he became a trombonist in the Royal Concertgebouw Orchestra.

During this time, he also continued his studies at the Conservatory of the Muzieklyceum Society in conducting, harmony, and counterpoint, receiving lessons from Kees van Baaren. After a meeting with Theo Uden Masman in May, 1945, Cleber joined Masman's dance orchestra De Ramblers, again as a trombonist. He continued playing with De Ramblers until 1945, when on the request of conductor Dolf van der Linden, he became a trombonist and arranger for the new Metropole Orkest. He remained with them until 1948, making several studio recordings with van der Linden, and at the same time, he led Selecta, his own ensemble of twelve musicians.

=== Conductor ===
In 1948, Cleber left the Netherlands to work for Radio Batavia in the Dutch East Indies, forming the Cosmopolitain Orkest. His wife and daughter followed later.

Cleber returned to the Netherlands to share the direction of AVRO's theatre orchestra with Gerard van Krevelen. In 1952, he formed De Zaaiers, a pops orchestra, for AVRO, which with additional string players expanded to become a newly formed Cosmopolitain Orkest a year later. In 1957, his orchestra won the ‘Golden Gondola’ in Venice. He also worked as an arranger not only for his own orchestra but also for the Metropole Orkest and Promenade Orkest.

In the late 1950s and early 1960s, Cleber also worked as a staff conductor for Phonogram, making recordings with Conny Stuart, Corry Brokken, Mieke Telkamp, Jules de Corte, and Willy Alberti, among others. From 1962-64, Cleber lived in South Africa, trying unsuccessfully to start a new orchestra in Johannesburg. While in South Africa, Cleber recorded a long playing record titled "Charles Segal's Compositions", featuring the compositions of South African pianist and composer Charles Segal. Cleber returned to conduct De Zaaiers and the Cosmopoitain Orkest until 1966, when AVRO dissolved them during a period of cost-cutting.

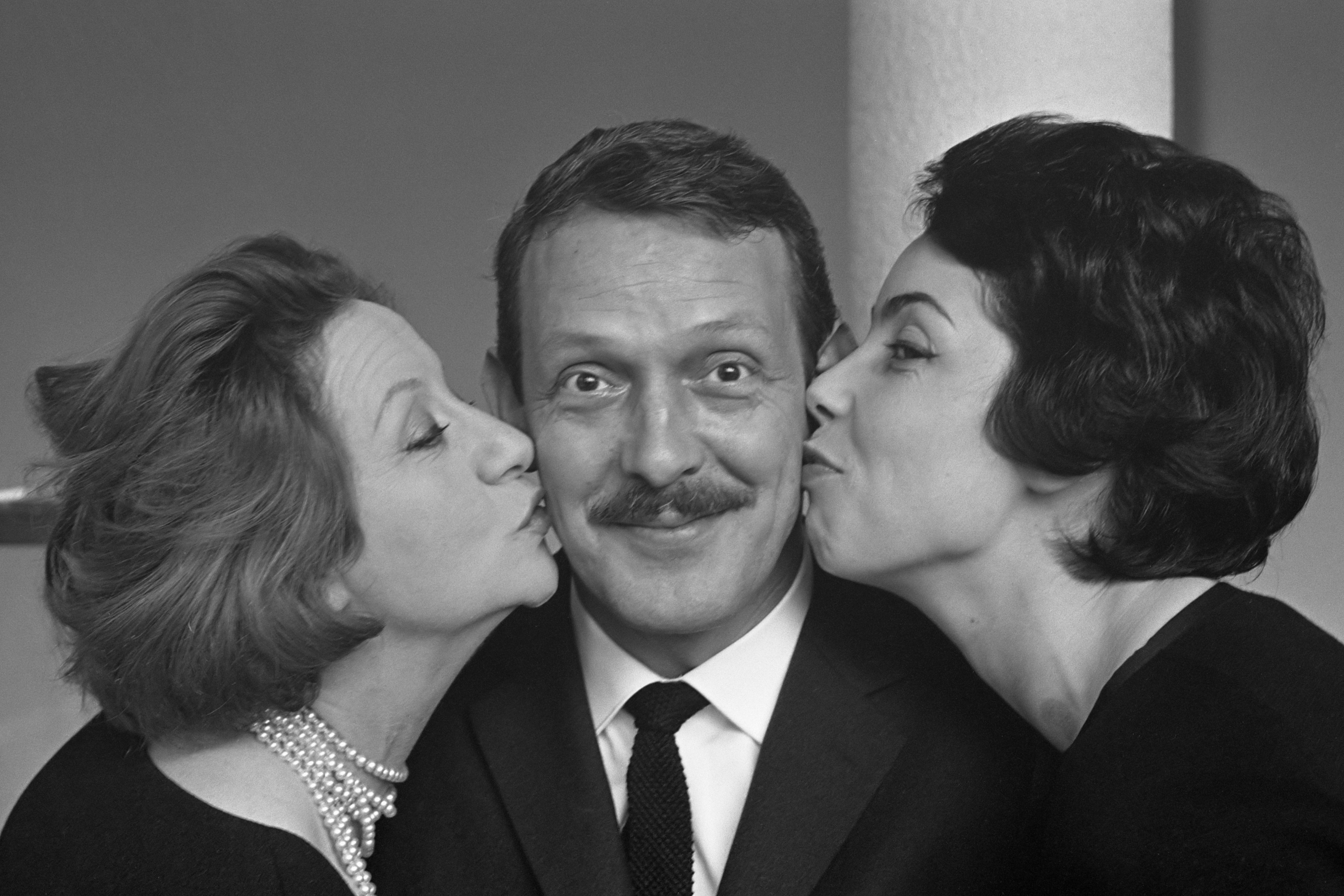
Jos Cleber kissed goodbye by Conny Stuart and Corry Brokken (1962)

=== Producer ===
Even after his orchestras had disbanded, Cleber was in demand for developing new musical talent. He remained at AVRO for two years as a music advisor, and from 1968 until his retirement in 1981, he produced the program Jonge mensen op weg naar het concertpodium.

=== Composer ===
==== Orchestration of Indonesia Raya ====
In 1950, Jusuf Ronodipuro (then the Studio Head of Radio Republik Indonesia), requested that Cleber arrange Indonesia Raya for orchestra, upon which Cleber began a preliminary study on the history and actual impression the anthem intended to convey, and concluded that he sensed a Marseillaise impression in Indonesia Raya. Cleber's first arrangement was subsequently recorded in the RRI Studio, Central Jakarta, in early 1951, involving Cleber's orchestra and two other RRI orchestras. The initial response to the orchestration was warm and Cleber joined Ronodipuro to present the recording to President Sukarno. However, upon hearing it, Sukarno commented that the arrangement was too embellished.

Sukarno wanted Indonesia Raya to be as majestic as the Dutch national anthem, Wilhelmus. Wilhelmus has a slow tempo (largo), whereas Indonesia Raya was intended to have a march tempo (Tempo di marcia), which led to Cleber's initial disagreement with the president over the orchestration. He began to work on the second arrangement, and the tempo was changed to Maestoso con bravura, ("majestically and with bravura"). Sukarno liked the second arrangement better; however, he thought that there should be a part in the anthem that expresses beauty, softness, and sweetness, just prior to the climactic refrain. In the third arrangement, Cleber modified the verses right before the chorus to employ the string section, whereas the chorus itself was accompanied by the timpani, cymbal, and brass section. Sukarno considered this arrangement perfect and approved it.

== Personal life ==
On 8 February 1939, Clever married Elisa Magdelijns (1917–2007), with whom he had a daughter, Yvonne Charlotte Cleber. The couple later divorced on 25 September 1951. Three months later, on 12 December 1951, he married Johanna Dirkje de Bruijn (born 1923), a cabaretière, in Jakarta. From this marriage, his second daughter, Karian, was born.
