= Peter Beets =

Dutch jazz pianist (born 1971)

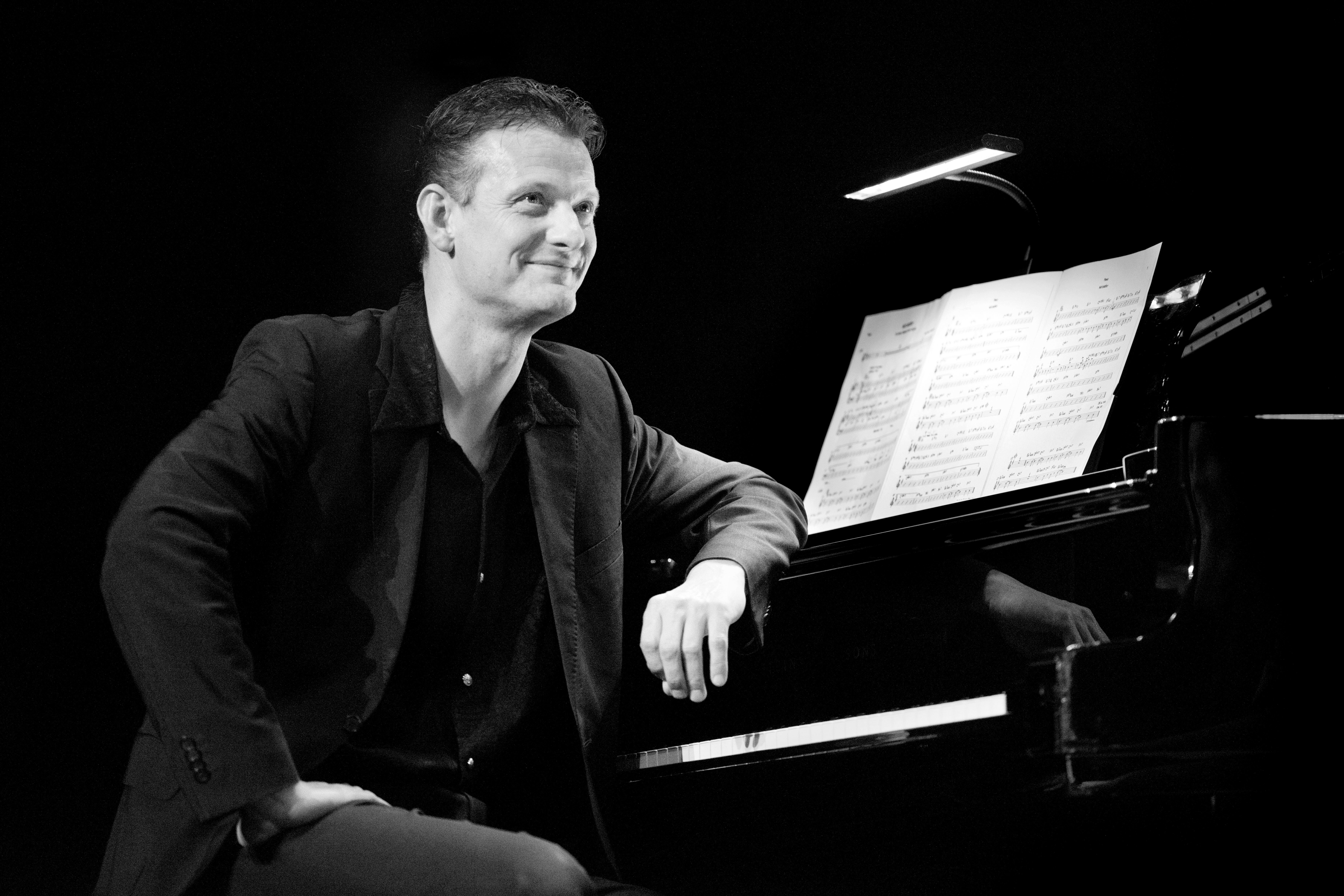
- Peter Beets

Background information
- Born: 12 June 1971 (age 55); The Hague, Netherlands
- Genre: Jazz
- Occupation: Musician
- Instrument: Piano
- Years active: 1980s–present
- Label: Magic Ball Jazz Records

Peter Beets (born 12 June 1971) is a Dutch jazz pianist. He has shared the stage with Chick Corea, Wynton Marsalis, Dee Dee Bridgewater, George Coleman, Johnny Griffin, Chris Potter, Kurt Rosenwinkel and John Clayton. He recorded with Jeff Hamilton and Curtis Fuller and in 2001 he released his New York Trio, which was the start of his international career.

== Biography ==
=== Early years ===
Beets was born in The Hague on 12 June 1971. His mother is a music teacher and his father a jazz-playing gynaecologist with a love of Oscar Peterson and Art Blakey. This musical family, which includes two elder brothers, Marius and Alexander, moved in 1972 to Groenlo, where Peter received his first piano lessons at the age of six. Marius (1966) and Alexander (1968) become professional musicians (on double bass and tenor sax). After college, Beets studied from 1989 at the Royal Conservatory of The Hague. He combined his music studies with law school, but he decided to concentrate exclusively on music.

=== Career ===
From 1985 the brothers performed together as the Beets Brothers. In 1990 The Beets Brothers' first album was released, followed by School Is Closed Now (1993) and Brotherwise (1995). In 1996, Beets recorded a trio album called First Date with Jeff Hamilton on drums. He became a popular pianist in the Netherlands and accompanied Deborah Brown, Dee Daniels, and Rita Reys. In 1998 he graduated from the conservatory and became the pianist of the Jazz Orchestra of the Concertgebouw. With trombonist Curtis Fuller, Beets made a live recording in 1999 and won the Concours de Solistes de Jazz in Monaco. More recordings followed: in 2000 Powerhouse, in 2001 All or Nothing at All.

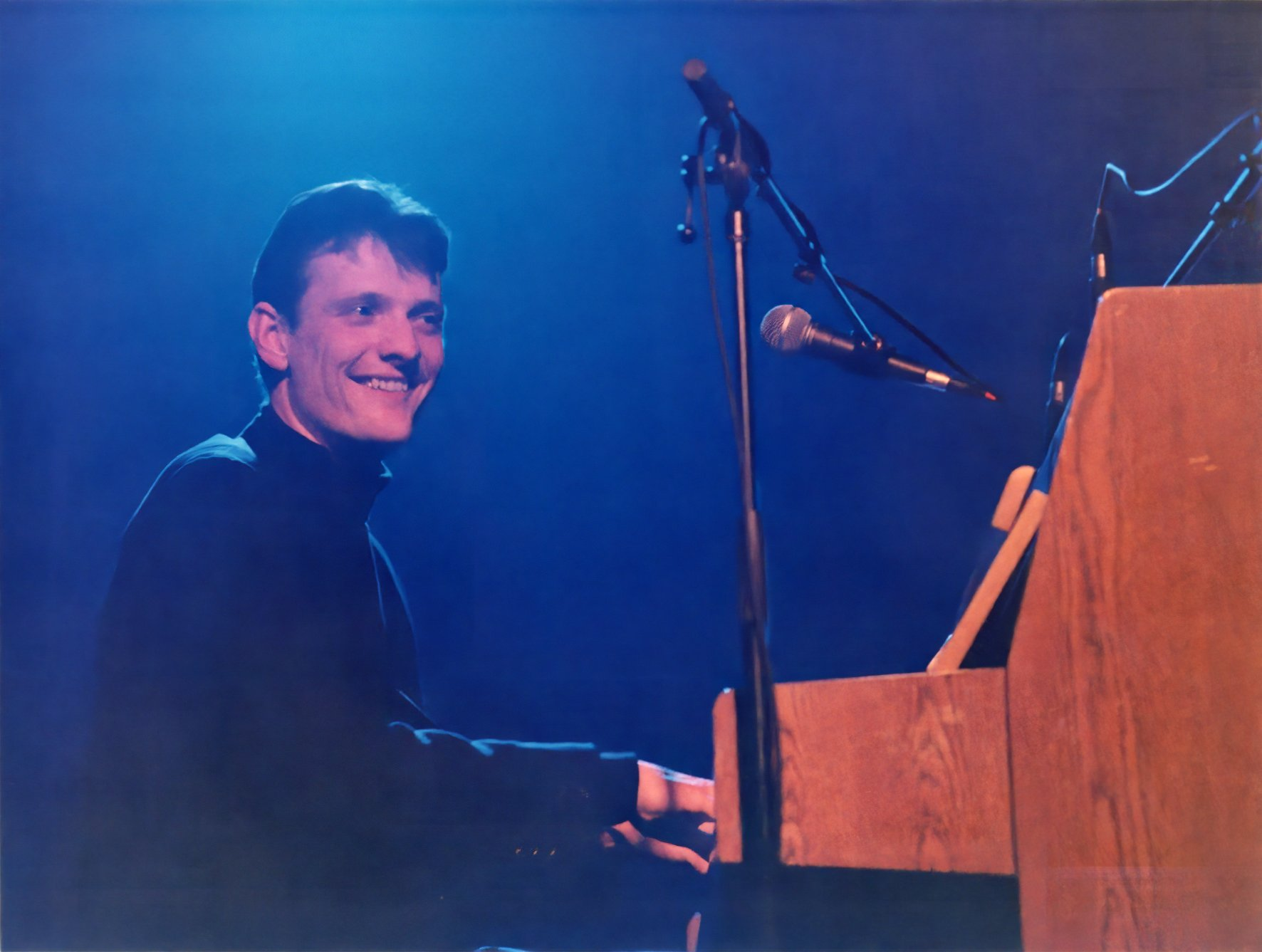
Beets in 2002

In 2001 Beets recorded the album New York Trio with Rodney Whitaker and Willie Jones III, his first album for Criss Cross. After the sequel, New York Trio Page Two, recorded with Larry Grenadier on bass, he made a third Criss Cross album, this time with Reginald Veal on bass and drummer Herlin Riley. In October 2007 the album New Groove appeared. This time he chose to perform without drums, but with the strength of piano, guitar and bass. The album is recorded in New York featuring Joe Cohn (guitar) and Reuben Rogers (bass). A few songs are recorded with a Dutch line up: Martijn van Iterson (guitar) and Ruud Jacobs (bass).

In 2010 Beets released two albums. Blues for the Date is a live recording made with the Jazz Orchestra of the Concertgebouw. This album features mainly songs composed by Beets. It won an Edison Award (the Dutch equivalent of the Grammy). In Autumn 2010, Criss Cross released the fifth album by Beets: Chopin Meets the Blues. On this album he uses Chopin melodies as a basis for jazz improvisation. He recorded this album with Joe Cohn (guitar), Reuben Rogers (double bass) and Greg Hutchinson (drums). In February 2013 he recorded again with this rhythm section. This album, called Portrait of Peterson is an homage to one of his biggest idols, Oscar Peterson.

Beets has had tours with his trio in Germany, Switzerland, Finland and Poland as well as in Japan and the US. He played at the Birdland Club in New York as a special guest for one week.

=== Theater programs ===
A duet for two grand pianos with Chick Corea (with whom he shares a birthday) in the large auditorium of the Amsterdam Concertgebouw resulted in a performance in trio setting there on 16 April 2005. The success of the trio's first Dutch theatre tour From Bach to Blues (2003) led to a return in the theaters in 2005 with the program Chopin Meets the Blues, followed by Porgy and Bess (2006), presenting his arrangements of the Gershwin opera. In Autumn 2007 he returned with the program The Blues Goes Latin, highlighting Latin American rhythms. After touring extensively abroad throughout 2008 Beets' trio returned to the Dutch stage in 2009 with a tribute to Oscar Peterson. In 2010 Dutch pianist Louis van Dijk invited Beets to join him on an extended tour called the Piano Kings and in the following season Beets worked with the Rosenberg Trio.

== Awards and honors ==
- Pall Mall Swing Award, 1988
- Princess Christina Award, 1989
- Prix Martial Solal, 1998
- Concours de Solistes de Jazz, 1999
- Edison Award, Blues for the Date, 2010

== Discography ==
=== As leader ===
Year released	Title	Label	Personnel
1996	First Date	Quintessence	
1996	First Date Live	Maxtanter	
2001	All or Nothing at All	Edel	
2001	New York Trio	Criss Cross	Rodney Whitaker (bass), Willie Jones III (drums)
2002	New York Trio Page Two	Criss Cross	Larry Grenadier (bass), Willie Jones III (drums)
2005	New York Trio Page 3	Criss Cross	Reginald Veal (bass), Herlin Riley (drums)
2005	Live at the Concertgebouw Volume 1	Maxanter	Frans van Geest (bass), Gijs Dijkhuizen (drums)
2005	Live at the Concertgebouw Volume II	Maxanter	Frans van Geest (bass), Gijs Dijkhuizen (drums)
2007	New Groove	Criss Cross	Joe Cohn (guitar), Reuben Rogers (bass)
2010	Chopin Meets the Blues	Criss Cross	Joe Cohn (guitar), Reuben Rogers (bass), Greg Hutchinson (drums)
2013	Portrait of Peterson	Magic Ball	Reuben Rogers (bass), Greg Hutchinson (drums)
2014	Live at the Amsterdam Concertgebouw	Challenge	Fay Claassen
2019	Our Love Is Here to Stay: Gershwin Reimagined		

=== As Beets Brothers ===
- 1990 Beets Brothers
- 1993 School Is Closed Now
- 1993 In the New World
- 1995 Brotherwise
- 1997 In Concert at The Jazzcafe
- 2000 Powerhouse
- 2002 Live in Holland
- 2003 Live in Holland (DVD)

=== As sideman ===
With Basily

- 1999 Swing for the Gipsies
- 2005 Memories

With Joe Cohn

- 2009 Shared Contemplations (Criss Cross)
- 2011 Fuego (Criss Cross)

With Jazz Orchestra of the Concertgebouw

- 1999 Festival 1999, Part 1
- 2003 30 Jaar Sesjun
- 2004 Sunday Nights in Amsterdam
- 2005 Tribute to Ray Charles
- 2007 Riffs & Rhythms
- 2008 Silk Rush
- 2009 Jazz at the Concertgebouw 3
- 2010 Blues for the Date (Challenge)

With Lils Mackintosh

- 1997 Seasons (Quintessence)
- 1999 Black Girl (Quintessence)

With Rita Reys

- 2003 Live in Concert
- 2004 Beautiful Love
- 2010 Young at Heart

With others

- 2005 Marius Beets, Marius Beets and the Powerhouse Big Band Vol. 1 (Maxtander)
- 2000 Deborah Carter, Michael Varekamp, Frits Landesbergen, Dear Louis
- 2010 Ronnie Cuber, InfraRae (Maxtander)
- 2002 The Hague All Stars, A Tribute to Horace Silver
- 1994 Tom Klein, Statement
- 1999 Mark Alban Lotz, Blue Moods (VIA Jazz)
- 2000 Masters of Swing, Harlem Strut
- 1998 New Concert Big Band, Festival
- 2008 Florin Niculescu, Florin Niculescu Plays Stephane Grappelli
- 2007 Piet Noordijk, Jubilee Concert
- 2001 Rosenberg Trio, Suenos Gitanos (Polydor)
- 2015 Paulus Schäfer, Letter to Van Gogh (Sinti Music)
- 2007 Niels Tausk, Blown Away: An Album of Dedications
- 2011 Koh Mr. Saxman/Alexander Beets Quartet/Artvark Saxophone Quartet, King of Jazz (Tribute to Bhumibol Adulyadej)
