= Rembrandt Frerichs =

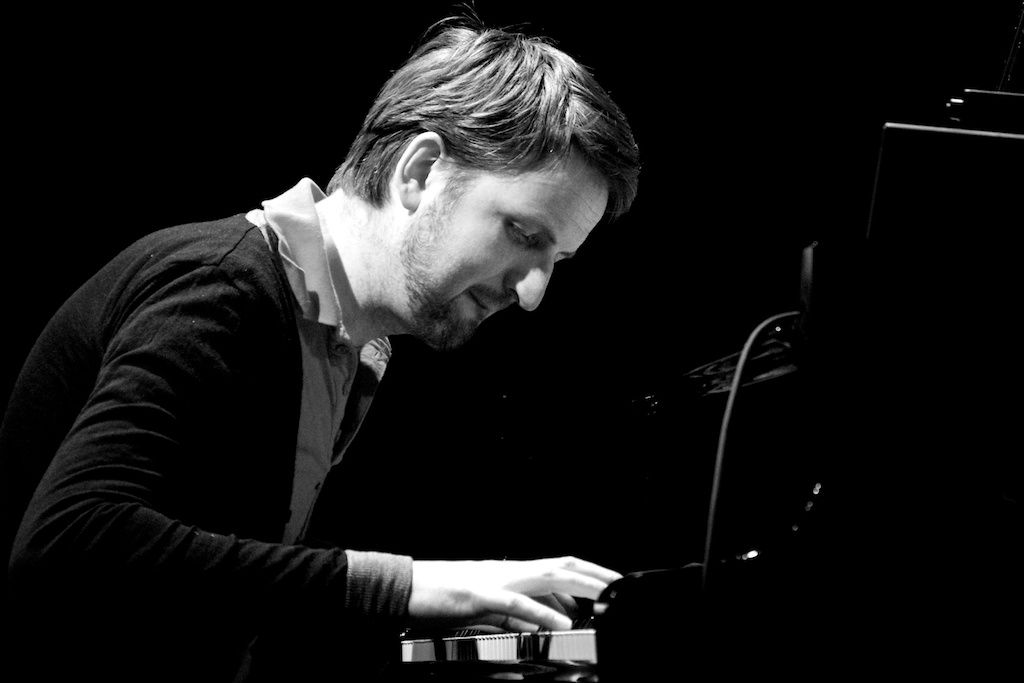
- Rembrandt Frerichs - Foto: Jurjen Donkers

Background information
- Born: 1977 (age 47–48); Rotterdam
- Genres: jazz
- Occupation: musician
- Instrument: piano
- Years active: 1995-
- Website: www.rembrandtfrerichs.nl

Rembrandt Frerichs (born 1977) is a jazz pianist and composer from the Netherlands. He leads a few ensembles: Rembrandt Frerichs Trio and Levantasy. In his playing he is being influenced by the American jazz tradition, as well by philosophy and Arabic music. Frerichs teaches jazz piano on the conservatory of Tilburg.

== Life ==
Frerichs studied at the Royal Conservatory of The Hague and the New York Conservatory for Dramatic Arts. He completed his studies in The Hague with honors. At the age of 22 he made his debut at the North Sea Jazz Festival. Rembrandt plays in several of his own ensembles such as Rembrandt Frerich Trio, Chiaroscuro and (with Vinsent Planjer and Yoram Lachish) 'Levantasy'. He has also collaborated with Michael Brecker, the New Trombone Collective, Marnix Busstra, Michel Godard, and Hermione Deurloo. In addition to jazz, he was inspired by classical European music as well as Arabic music, for which he developed a passion during a two-year stay in Egypt.

Frerichs teaches jazz piano at the Conservatory of Tilburg and has been a guest teacher at the conservatories of Amsterdam, Rotterdam and Utrecht. He is also artistic director of various cultural events, such as the Rabo Jazz Festival (Oud-Beijerland), the Waterfront Jazz Club (Almere) and the Regentenkamer (The Hague).

His debut album Self Portrait was nominated for an Edison Award In 2014, his album A Long Story Short was also nominated for this prestigious Dutch award.

== Discography ==
- Self Portrait (Plastik People, 2007)
- Ordem E Progesso Vol.1 (Plastik People, 2009)
- Ordem E Progesso Vol.2 (Plastik People, 2009)
- Levantasy (Kepera, 2010, with Yoram Lachish, Tony Overwater and Vinsent Planjer)
- A Long Story Short (Challenge Records, 2014, with Tony Overwater, and Vinsent Planjer)
- The Contemporary Fortepiano (2018)
- It’s Still Autumn (Kepera, 2019, with Kayhan Kalhor, Tony Overwater, and Vinsent Planjer)
- Same Self, Same Silence (Just Listen Records, 2020 with Hossein Alizadeh)
