= Yuri Honing =

Dutch jazz saxophonist

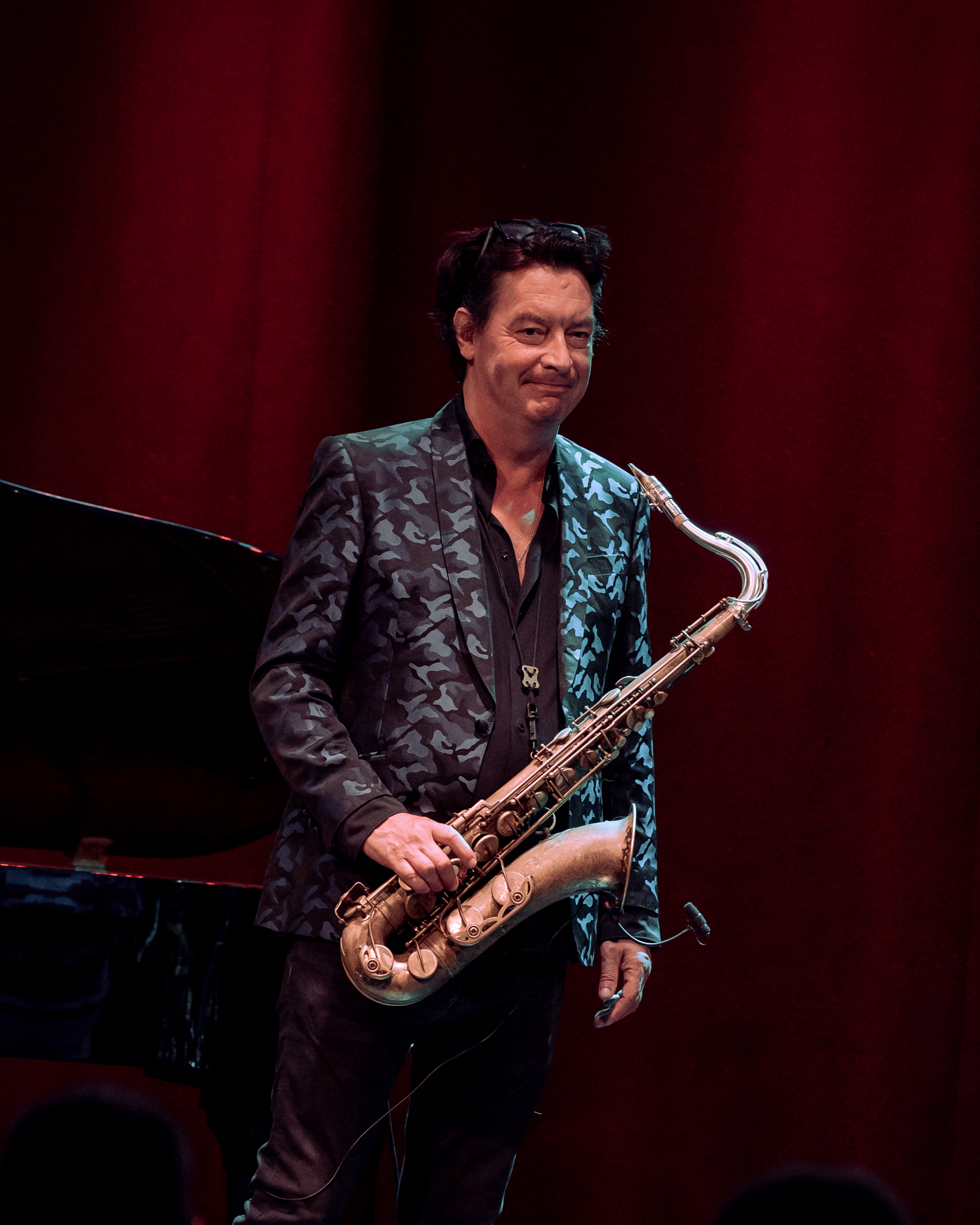
Honing in 2024

Yuri Honing (born July 6, 1965) is a Dutch jazz saxophonist and composer.

== Career ==
In 2001, Honing met Paul Bley and recorded the album Seven, featuring Bley on piano, Gary Peacock on bass, and Paul Motian on drums. This album garnered Honing the Dutch Edison Award in 2002. In The Penguin Guide to Jazz (8th Edition), this CD was recognized with four (out of five) stars.

For a few years, Honing organized a special concert named Winterreise at the Paradiso in Amsterdam. In December 2015 he played his final show at the venue.

After the success of his fusion band Yuri Honing Wired Paradise, which was characterized by its rock influence and electric guitars, Honing assembled his Acoustic Quartet in 2012. In 2016, the quartet won the Edison award for 'Best Instrumental Jazz Album' for their second CD, Desire (2015). The group's third album, Goldbrun (2018), won this award as well, making it his third Edison in total.

== Discography ==
=== As leader ===
Year	Album	Label / label code	Band	Line-up
1992	A Matter Of Conviction	Art in Jazz; 991 002-2	Yuri Honing Trio	Yuri Honing – tenor saxophone, Tony Overwater – double bass, Joost Lijbaart – drums
1996	Star Tracks	Jazz in Motion; JIM 75043	Yuri Honing Trio	Yuri Honing – tenor saxophone, Tony Overwater – double bass, Joost Lijbaart – drums
1998	Playing	Jazz in Motion; JIM 75044	Yuri Honing & Misha Mengelberg	Yuri Honing – tenor saxophone, soprano saxophone; Misha Mengelberg – piano
1999	Sequel	Jazz in Motion; JIM 75045	Yuri Honing Trio	Yuri Honing – tenor saxophone; Tony Overwater – double bass, whistle; Joost Lijbaart – drums
2000	Lively	Buzz Records; ZZ 76015	Yuri Honing/Misha Mengelberg/Ernst Reijseger	Yuri Honing – tenor saxophone, soprano saxophone; Misha Mengelberg – piano; Ernst Reijseger – cello
2001	Memory Lane	Turtle Records; TRSA 0010	Yuri Honing	Yuri Honing – tenor saxophone, soprano saxophone; Maarten Ornstein – clarinet, bass clarinet; Emily Benyon – whistle; Jacob Slagter – horn; Keiko Iwate – violin; Fred Pot – cello; Achim Kaufmann – piano; Frans van der Hoeven – double bass; Joost Lijbaart – drums
2001	Seven	Jazz in Motion; JIM 75086	Yuri Honing/Paul Bley/Gary Peacock/Paul Motian	Yuri Honing – tenor saxophone, Paul Bley – piano, Gary Peacock – double bass, Paul Motian – drums
2002	Orient Express	Jazz in Motion; JIM 75123	Yuri Honing Trio & Rima Khcheich, Basem Havar, Latif al Obaidi	Yuri Honing – tenor saxophone; Tony Overwater – double bass, whistle; Joost Lijbaart – drums; Rima Khcheich – vocals; Basem Havar – strings [djose]; Latif al Obaidi – drum [darbuka], tambourine [riqq], oud [ud]
2004	Alive	Jazz in Motion; JIM 75213	Yuri Honing Trio	Yuri Honing – tenor saxophone; Tony Overwater – double bass, whistle; Joost Lijbaart – drums
2006	Symphonic	Jazz in Motion; JIM 75227	Yuri Honing, Vince Mendoza & Metropole Orkest	Yuri Honing – tenor saxophone, soprano saxophone; Vince Mendoza – conductor; Metropole Orkest
2006	Temptation	Jazz in Motion; JIM 75228; 2 CD	Yuri Honing Wired Paradise	Yuri Honing – tenor saxophone, soprano saxophone; Frank Möbus – guitar; Tony Overwater – bass, double bass; Joost Lijbaart – drums
2007	Winterreise	Jazz in Motion; JIM 75368	Yuri Honing & Nora Mulder	Yuri Honing – tenor saxophone, soprano saxophone; Misha Mengelberg – piano
2008	Meet Your Demons	Jazz in Motion; JIM 75419	Yuri Honing Wired Paradise	Yuri Honing – tenor saxophone, soprano saxophone; Frank Möbus – guitar; Paul Jan Bakker – guitar; Tony Overwater – bass, double bass; Joost Lijbaart – drums
2009	Phase Five	Verve; 270377-4	Yuri Honing & Floris	Yuri Honing – tenor saxophone, soprano saxophone; Floris Klinkert – beats, programming; David Pino – vocals, guitar; Leine – vocals, guitar; Janne Schra – vocals; Lilian Vieria – vocals; Sarah Bettens – vocals; Olger Star – scratches; Sietse van Gorkom – violin; Ro Krauss – viola, Stef van Es – electric guitar; Lucas Dols – double bass
2010	White Tiger	Jazz In Motion; JIM 75966	Yuri Honing Wired Paradise	Yuri Honing – tenor saxophone, soprano saxophone; Frank Möbus – guitar; Stef van Es – guitar; Mark Haanstra – bass; Joost Lijbaart – drums
2012	True	Challenge Records; CR73336	Yuri Honing Acoustic Quartet	Yuri Honing – tenor saxophone, soprano saxophone; Wolfert Brederode – piano; Ruben Samam – bass; Joost Lijbaart – drums
2015	Desire	Challenge Records; CR73378	Yuri Honing Acoustic Quartet	Yuri Honing – tenor saxophone, Wolfert Brederode – piano, Gulli Gudmundsson – double bass, Joost Lijbaart – drums
2017	Goldbrun	Challenge Records; CR73446	Yuri Honing Acoustic Quartet	Yuri Honing – tenor saxophone, Wolfert Brederode – piano, Gulli Gudmundsson – double bass, Joost Lijbaart – drums
2020	Bluebeard	Challenge Records; CR73466	Yuri Honing Acoustic Quartet	Yuri Honing – tenor saxophone, Wolfert Brederode – piano, Gulli Gudmundsson – double bass, Joost Lijbaart – drums
