= Tony Overwater =

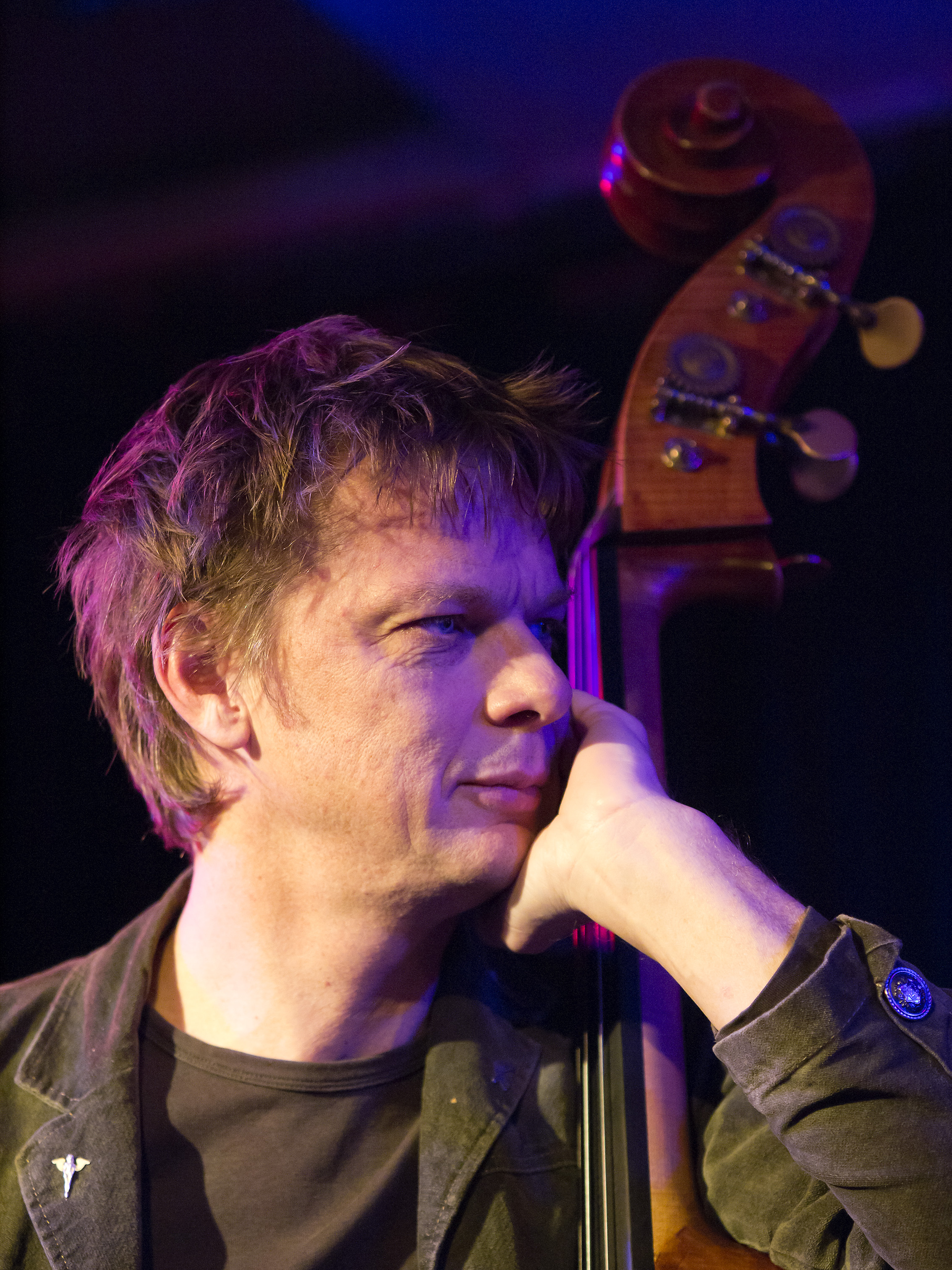
- Overwater, Jazzclub Unterfahrt, 2011

Background information
- Born: 24 March 1965 (age 61); Rotterdam, The Netherlands
- Genres: Jazz; jazz fusion
- Occupations: Musician, composer, bandleader
- Instrument: Bass
- Labels: Jazz in Motion Records, Turtle
- Website: tonyoverwater.com

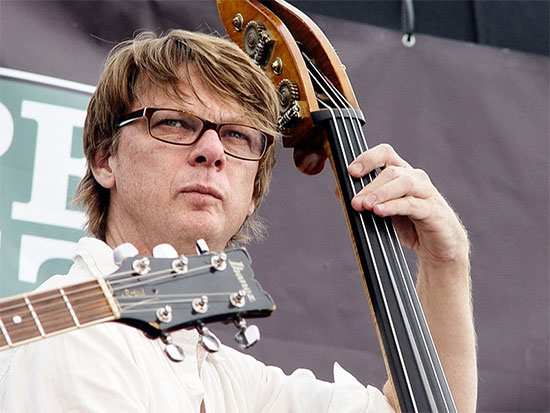
Tony Overwater (2013)

Tony Overwater (Rotterdam, 24 March 1965) is a Dutch jazz bassist (acoustic bass and violone) and composer of jazz and improvisational music. In 2002 he received the Boy Edgar Award, the most important jazz award in The Netherlands. Presently, Overwater is mainly active in a crossover of jazz, Arab and early music.

== Career ==
=== Jazz ===
Overwater studied at the Royal Conservatory of The Hague under John Clayton and had lessons from Dave Holland, Charlie Haden and others.

In 1989 he started his first band, Scapes, and received an award from the Stichting Jazz in Nederland for being the most promising musician. In that year he toured with Sunny and David Murray, and in the following years he recorded numerous albums, including A Sanctuary Within (1992). He also became a member of Yuri Honing’s trio, with which he toured for over 25 years. The trio recorded several albums, the most recent one in 2008. He also has been active in the trio DelFerro/Overwater/Paeffgen, which also produced some albums. Under his own name he worked with a variety of musicians in various ensembles. One such ensemble, Jungle Boldie, included Maarten Ornstein and Wim Kegel, with whom he recorded a number of albums. The album Op (2001), which also featured Ack van Rooyen and Ernst Reijseger, was a tribute to bassist Oscar Pettiford and resulted in an Edison Award. Ornstein and Overwater collaborated on a number of recordings and worked together repeatedly, such as in the band V, with Rima Khcheich, Kikker and many others.

In 2005 he worked together for the first time with the Calefax Reed Quintet in a project based on two suites by Duke Ellington. His trio, together with Calefax, toured in the Middle East, India and other countries. They recorded a CD which was nominated for an Edison Award.

Currently, Overwater works regularly with Rembrandt Frerichs and Vinsent Planjer in various combos, including the Rembrandt Frerichs Trio, the Contemporary Fortepiano and a band with Kayhan Kalhor.

=== Arab Music ===
Overwater played with many Arab musicians such as the Moroccan oud player Said Chraibi, the Syrian clarinettist Kinan Azmeh and Algerian violinist Kheiredinne M’Kachiche.

In 1995 Overwater went on a tour with the Yuri Honing Trio through the Middle East (primarily Lebanon and Syria) where he became interested in Arab music. During this tour he met the Lebanese vocalist Rima Khcheich and this resulted in a long-term collaboration.

He later intensified his collaboration with Khcheich. They performed regularly and released several CDs in the muwashshah style, in which the acoustic bass replaces the oud and for which he developed a technique to play Arab microtonalities on the acoustic bass.

Together with pianist Rembrandt Frerichs and percussionist/drummer Vinsent Planjer, Overwater formed in 2009 the Rembrandt Frerichs Trio which performs with guest musicians from the Middle East.

In 2013 Overwater started Salon Joussour, a series of lectures, workshops and concerts in The Netherlands which aims to create a bridge between musicians from the Middle East and Europe.

=== Music for children ===
In 2000 Overwater wrote music to accompany children’s stories about a frog by Max Velthuijs. A performance (in which he played live while Velthuijs read aloud and sketched) was broadcast on Dutch national television. In 2002 he went on tour with Velthuijs and performed at the North Sea Jazz Festival. Their collaboration resulted in two albums with frog stories, of which Kikker Swingt received a gold record. In the following years Overwater also got involved in music education for children with organisations such as Oorkaan and the Royal Concertgebouw Orchestra. There he developed shows together with Lotte van Dijck such as Papa Pia, Dwaallichtje, and Glimp (awarded with the YAMA Young Audiences Music Awards 2015.)

=== Applied Music ===
Overwater has composed and performed music for silent films. In 1992 he wrote music for Fritz Lang's Metropolis and in 1994 his quartet played live accompaniments to films by Joris Ivens and also several French films, such as by Germaine Dulac. In 1994 he created the 'auditory' movie Motion Music. In the following years he wrote arrangements for several documentaries by Brigit Hillenius. He also got involved with music written specifically for dance such as his compositions when he composed music for choreographer Anouk van Dijk with whom he performed live, as well as with the Scapino Ballet.

In recent years Overwater created music for several documentaries. Examples include Varia Americana, Om de Oude Wereldzee and Justice For Sergei, which won the Cinema for Peace Award for Justice 2012 in Berlin.

== Important bands ==
- Tony Overwater Ensemble
- Rembrandt Frerichs Trio
- Jungle Boldie
- Rima Khcheich
- Hermine Deurloo Quartet
- Glimp

== Other collaborations ==
- Joshua Samson
- Sylvie Courvoisier
- A group including Misha Mengelberg and Pierre Favre
- The Treya Quartet
- Vandoorn
- Dufay
- Heleen van den Hombergh
- Nathalie Laurier
- Marc van Roon
- Lotte van Dijck
- Karin Hammar
- Kayhan Kalhor

== Discography ==
=== As a leader ===
- Changes in Time (Scapes), Timeless, 1989
- Motion Music, JIM, 1994
- Up Close, Turtle, 1999
- Op, Turtle, 2001
- Over the Rainbow, First Impression Music, 2003
- Kikker Swingt (Tony Overwater quintet with Max Velthuijs), JIM, 2003
- Ellington Suites, (Tony Overwater Trio with Calefax), JIM, 2005
- Kikker Heeft De Blues, JIM, 2007
- Jungleboldie (Tony Overwater Trio), Turtle, 2010
- Om De Oude Wereldzee (Tony Overwater Ensemble), JIM, 2015

=== As a sideman ===
- Sanctuary Within (David Murray)
- Falak (Rima Khcheich), JIM, 2008
- Hawa (Rima Khcheich), JIM, 2013
- WashWishni (Rima Khcheich), JIM, 2016
- Long Story Short (Rembrandt Frerichs Trio)
- Star Tracks (Yuri Honing Trio)
- Alive (Yuri Honing Trio)
- Sequel (Yuri Honing Trio)
- Everyday Magic (Karin Hammar)
- Levantasy (Kepera Trio)
- Glass Fish (Hermine Deurloo)

== Awards and honors ==
- 1989 Podium Prize
- 2001 Edison award
- 2002 Boy Edgar Award
- 2002 Bird Award (nomination)
- 2005 Bird Award (nomination)
- 2008 Gold record
