= Fapy Lafertin =

Belgian gypsy-jazz guitarist (born 1950)

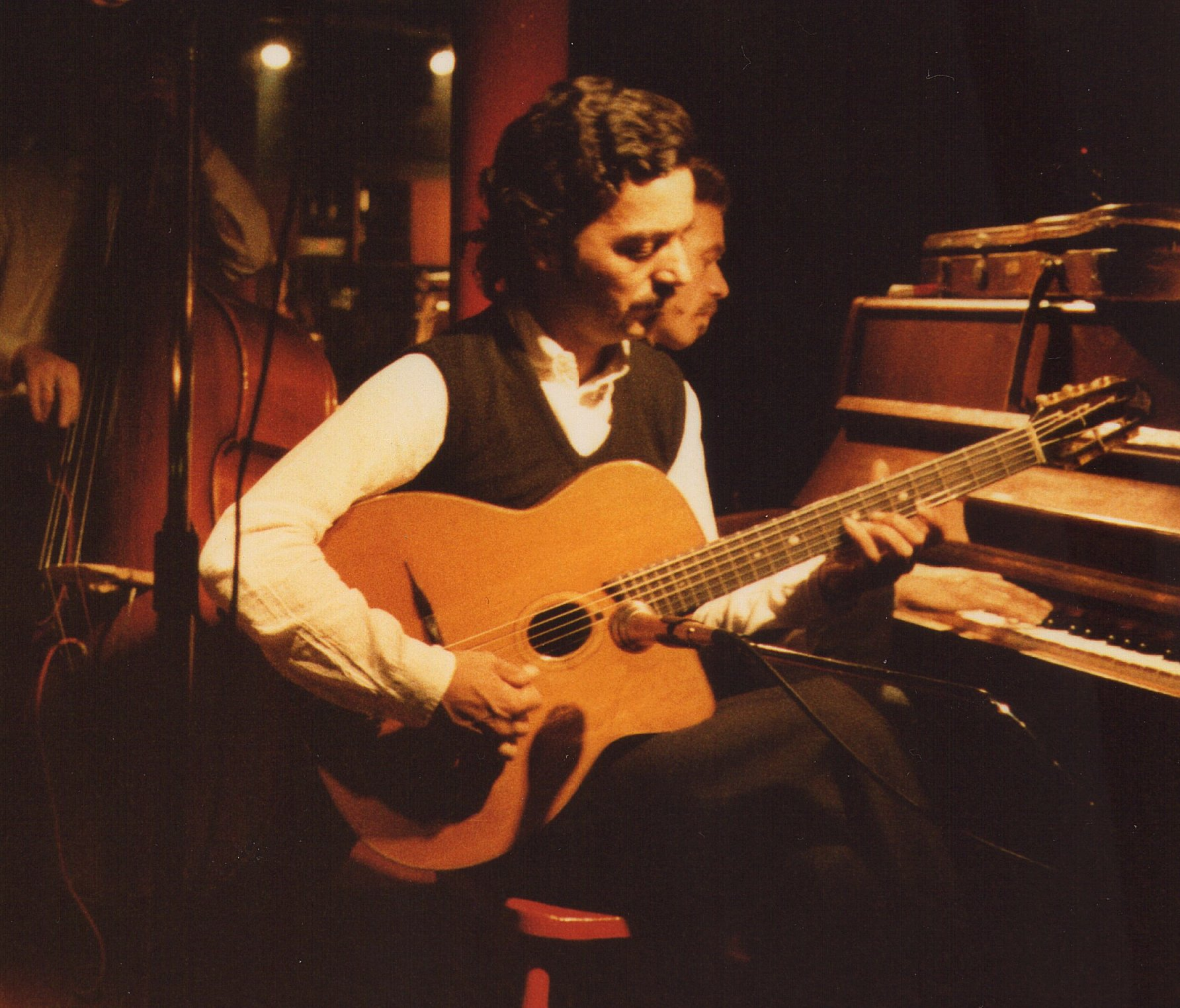
- Fapy Lafertin on stage at the Pizza Express, London, 1983

Background information
- Born: 20 November 1950; Kortrijk, Belgium
- Genres: Jazz, Gypsy jazz, samba, fado
- Occupation: Musician
- Instrument: Guitar
- Years active: 1975–present

Fapy Lafertin (born 20 November 1950) is a Belgian guitarist in the Belgian-Dutch gypsy jazz style.

Lafertin was born in Kortrijk, Belgium in the Manouche Romani community and took up guitar at the age of five. After performing in a family band with his father on violin and his brother on second guitar, he joined the Piotto Limberger orchestra. He also toured with his uncle, Eddie Ferret.

In the 1970s and '80s, he was lead acoustic guitarist with the band "Waso", with Albert "Vivi" Limberger on rhythm guitar, Koen De Cauter on reeds (clarinet and saxophone) and vocals, and Michel Verstraeten on double bass. In 1985 he began a quartet which has featured Rudi Brink, Tim Kliphuis, and Joop Hendricks. He based the quartet on the Quintette du Hot Club de France. He began a solo career and toured throughout Europe and the UK. He has played with American jazz musicians such as Charlie Byrd, Al Casey, Scott Hamilton, Milt Hinton, and Benny Waters. Briefly he performed with Stéphane Grappelli.

Lafertin has used the 12-string guitarra, combining Portuguese fado and Brazilian samba with the music of Reinhardt, Duke Ellington, and the Great American Songbook in his repertoire.

== Discography ==
- Fleur de Lavende (Hot Club, 1991)
- Swing Guitars (Lejazzetal, 1994)
- Hungaria (Lejazzetal, 1996)
- Star Eyes (String Jazz, 2000)
- Fleur D'ennui (Timeless, 2001)
- Fine & Dandy (Iris Music, 2003)
- Django!! (W.E.R.F., 2010)
- A Summit in Paris with Evan Christopher (Camille Productions, 2020)
- Atlantico (Fremeaux, 2020)
