= Jaap Valkhoff =

Dutch musician, composer and lyricist

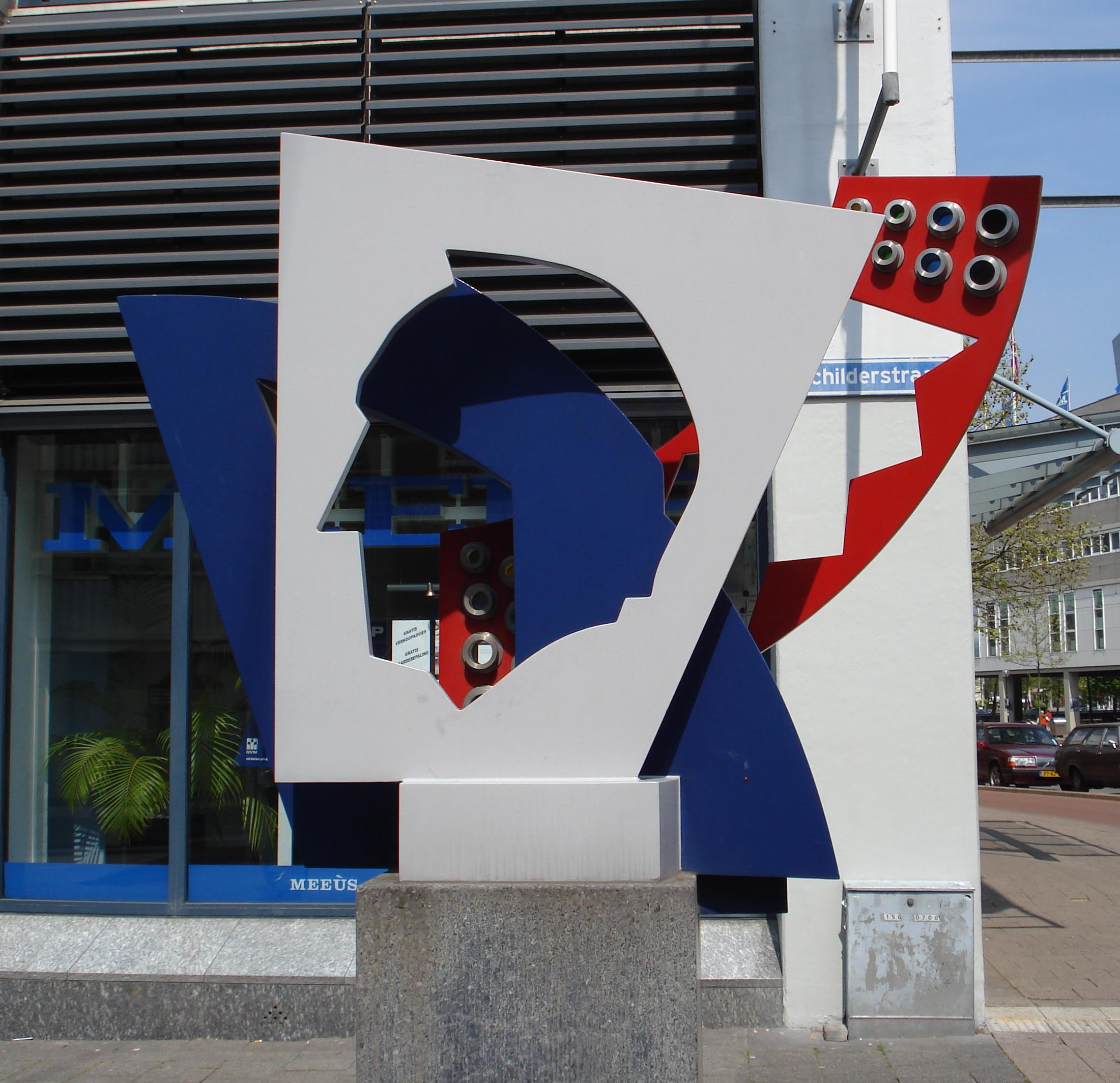

Jacobus (Jaap) Valkhoff (16 August 1910 in Rotterdam – 3 July 1992 in Hook of Holland) was a Dutch musician, composer and lyricist.

He wrote his most famous lyrics in 1961 at the request of Johnny Hoes, "Hand in hand, kameraden" (Hand in hand, comrades). The melody was already 70 years old (composed by Wilhelm Speidel) and the words were used to cheer on several Dutch football teams such as Ajax Amsterdam and Feyenoord Rotterdam. Hoes sang the song for all clubs at first, but the Feyenoord version proved to be the most popular, and it became the official club anthem.

Aged 81, he died in a car accident in Hook of Holland in 1991. In 1998 a statue to commemorate him, located at the corner of the Schilderstraat and the Schiedamsedijk in Rotterdam, was unveiled by alderman Hans Kombrink.
