= Tim Kliphuis =

Dutch violinist

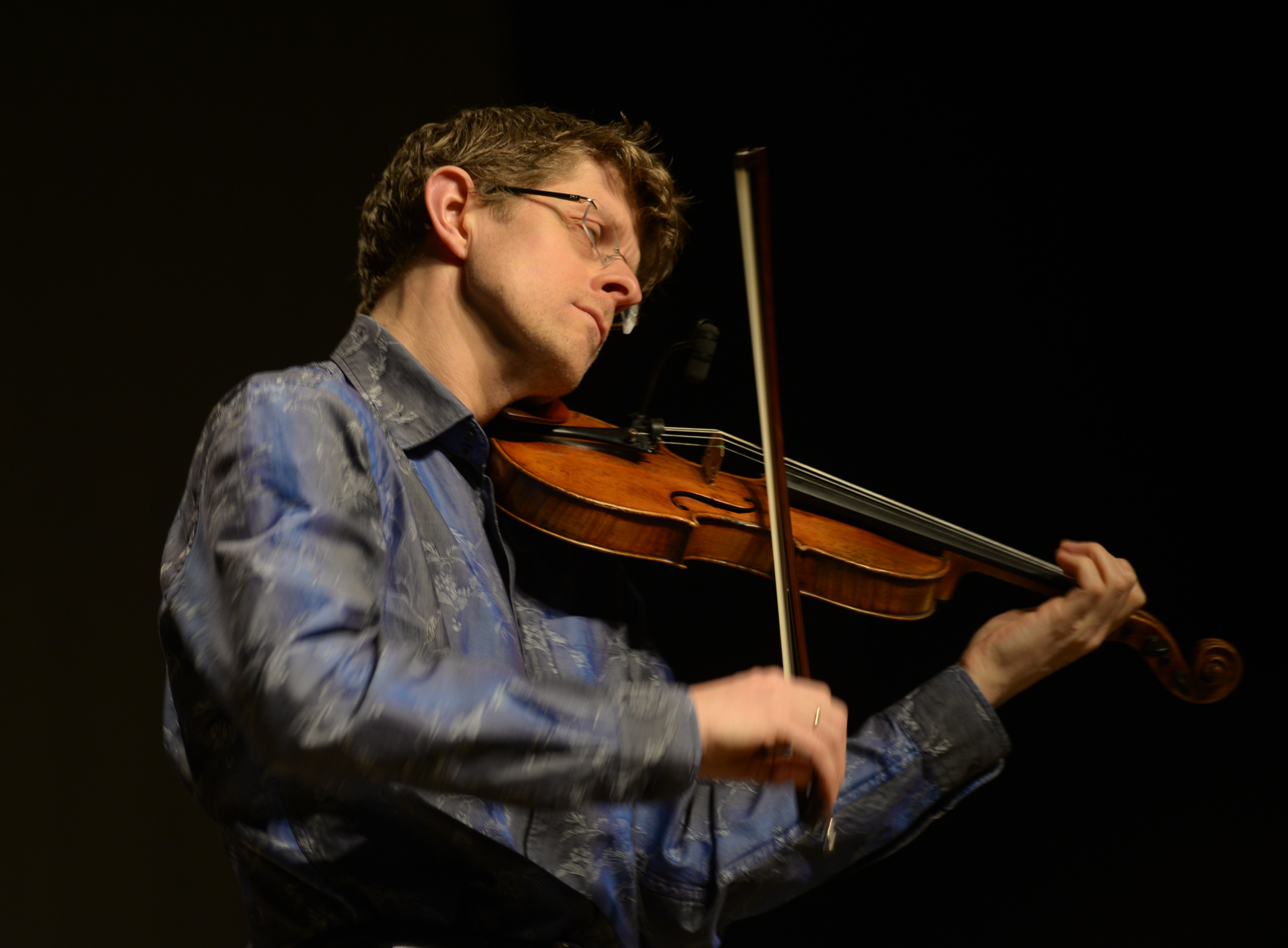
- Kliphuis performing in Moscow, February 2015

Background information
- Born: September 30, 1974; Utrecht, Netherlands
- Genres: Jazz, classical, folk
- Occupation: Musician
- Instrument: Violin
- Website: www.timkliphuis.com

Tim Kliphuis (born 30 September 1974 in Utrecht, Netherlands) is a Dutch violinist renowned for mixing gypsy jazz with classical and folk music, whose recent works have been dedicated to raising awareness about climate change.

== Biography ==
Kliphuis became known during his student years in Amsterdam in 1999, when he joined Belgian gypsy guitarist Fapy Lafertin. Kliphuis toured Europe with Lafertin's Quintet and featured on three albums before turning to a solo career in 2004.

He was classically trained at the Amsterdam Conservatoire and learned to improvise in the style of Stéphane Grappelli while working with the Dutch Sinti community. Other influences include saxophonist Stan Getz, guitarist Joe Pass, and violinist Jean-Luc Ponty. In 2006, Kliphuis started combining classical, folk, and world music with gypsy jazz and performing regularly outside the jazz world, in classical halls such as the Concertgebouw and folk festivals such as Celtic Connections.

An internationally touring musician, he has recorded with Angelo Debarre and performed with Martin Taylor, The Rosenberg Trio, Paulus Schäfer, Richard Galliano and traditional Celtic musicians Frankie Gavin and Charlie McKerron.

In 2011, he performed a large number of concerts with a UK quartet consisting of Roy Percy (bass), Nigel Clark (guitar) and David Newton (piano). They performed a concert at Iford Manor on 30 June 2011 which was then manufactured by Birnam and released as a live DVD.

Since 2012, Kliphuis has been working mostly in the Trio format with Nigel Clark and Roy Percy. In April 2012, they premiered a crossover project with the Netherlands Chamber Orchestra. In this concert, Kliphuis explored the common ground of classical string orchestra and string jazz trio, showcasing some of his own compositions, as well as material by Duke Ellington, Stéphane Grappelli, Richard Strauss, Aaron Copland, and others.

In 2013, Kliphuis dedicated his Trio's album The Grappelli Album to his hero, Stéphane Grappelli, whom he had met and played for in 1995. In 2015, he premiered a new piece in Amsterdam, "Reflecting the Seasons": a re-working of Vivaldi's Four Seasons for improvising Trio and string orchestra. Also that year, he released the album The Hilversum Sessions, which paired his Trio with three Dutch classical string players on violin, viola, and cello.

In September 2015, he curated the first Fiddles on Fire Festival in De Doelen Concert Hall, Rotterdam, an all-string collaboration with the Codarts Conservatoire orchestra, Irish fiddler Frankie Gavin and Norwegian Hardanger fiddler Gjermund Larsen; the festival was held in 2017 again together with Nordic Fiddlers Bloc and jazz violinist Fiona Monbet.

In 2016, Kliphuis signed a 3-record deal with Sony Classical Netherlands, of which the first album Reflecting the Seasons, recorded by his Trio and the Stellenbosch University Camerata, was released in October 2016.

In 2017, Kliphuis and his Trio played for the Dutch King and Queen for the annual King's Concert, broadcast nationwide on King's day; afterwards, Reflecting the Seasons peaked at No.1 on the i-Tunes classical chart.

In 2020, Kliphuis became curator for the Night of the Violin and the Jonge Makers Prijs, both organised by the Netherlands Violin Competition.

Kliphuis characterises himself as a climate composer. He has dedicated his climate change suite 'The Five Elements' and Triple Concerto 'Phoenix Rising' to the challenges on our planet, characterising 'Phoenix Rising' as "a response to the corona crisis and, by extension, the current state of the world.”

In 2022, he was invited by the Dutch royal couple to perform 'The Five Elements' for the Swedish royals in Stockholm, during a state visit centered around sustainability.

== Education ==
Kliphuis has hosted string improvisation workshops at festivals, competitions and other venues in America, South Africa, Japan, UK, and Europe. He is the best-known tutor for the violin style of Stéphane Grappelli, having written the best-selling book Stéphane Grappelli Gypsy Jazz Violin (Mel Bay, 2008). He followed this with the Hot Jazz Violin DVD set (HyperHip Media, 2009).

In August 2010, Tim Kliphuis founded the annual Grappelli-Django Camp with violinist Karin van Kooten and guitarist Reinier Voet, for international gypsy jazz players in the Netherlands. As of 2022, there are two editions per calendar year: the Summer Camp and the Winter Jam.

From 2012 to 2017, he was professor of jazz violin at Fontys Conservatoire in Tilburg. In 2012, he released his second book Grappelli Licks (Lowland Publications). In 2017, he hosted workshops at the Royal Conservatoire of The Hague.

Since 2015, Kliphuis is a member of the string faculty of the Conservatoire of Amsterdam, currently teaching improvisation to Strings and Young Talent.

In 2018 Kliphuis published the tuition book 'Improvisation for Strings' for classically trained people.

In 2022, Kliphuis started his online teaching resource, the Tim Kliphuis Studio.

== Selected orchestral compositions ==
- 2015: "Reflecting the Seasons" (Netherlands Chamber Orchestra)
- 2016: "Ulysses" (Omsk Philharmonic)
- 2018: "Brandenburg" (Residentie Orchestra)
- 2019: "The Stirling Queen" (Queen's Hall, Edinburgh)
- 2020: "The Five Elements"
- 2021: "Train to Basel" (Ricciotti Ensemble)
- 2021: "Phoenix Reborn" (NTR Zaterdagmatinee, Radio Filharmonisch Orkest)

== Honours ==
- 2013: Scottish Jazz Award, International
- 2017: South African Woordfees Award, Best Classical Performance
- 2021: Polish Swing Raven Award (Spring Jazz festival)

== Endorsements ==
- Tim Kliphuis is a Pirastro artist and plays on Evah Pirazzi strings.
- Kliphuis is a DPA artist and has used the DPA 4099 Violin microphone on stage since 2009, when it was first produced.

== Selected discography ==
- 2004: Live at Djangofest Northwest (Gypsy Jazz)
- 2005: The Grappelli Tribute (Robinwood)
- 2007: Live in Glasgow (Lowland)
- 2007: Swingin' the Classics (Robinwood)
- 2008: Counterpoint Swing (Lowland)
- 2010: Acoustic Voyage (Lowland)
- 2011: Tim Kliphuis and Friends: Live at Iford Manor (Iford)
- 2012: Tim Kliphuis & Paulus Schäfer Trio: Rock Django (Lowland)
- 2013: Tim Kliphuis Trio: The Grappelli Album (Lowland)
- 2015: Tim Kliphuis Sextet: The Hilversum Sessions (Lowland)
- 2016: Tim Kliphuis Trio & Orchestra: Reflecting the Seasons (Sony Classical)
- 2018: Tim Kliphuis Trio & Orchestra: Concertos (Sony Classical)
- 2020: Tim Kliphuis Trio: The Five Elements (Lowland)
