= Paulus Schäfer =

Dutch guitarist, composer, and arranger

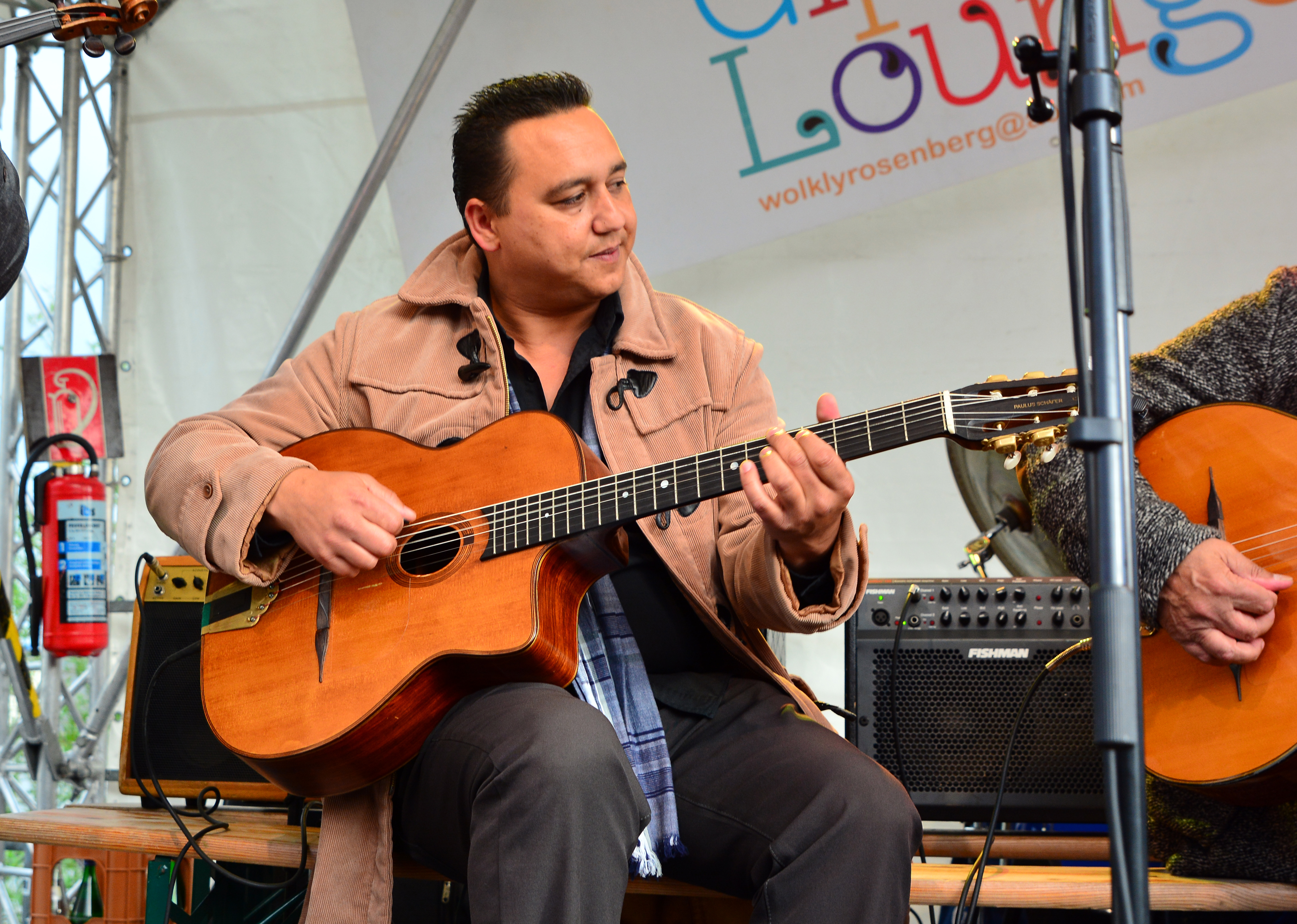
- Paulus Schäfer at Hafen Rock 2015, Hamburg, Germany

Background information
- Born: 31 March 1978 (age 46); Gerwen, Nuenen, Netherlands
- Genres: Gypsy jazz
- Occupation: Musician
- Instrument: Guitar
- Labels: Moncq, Sinti Music
- Website: www.paulusschafer.com

Paulus Schäfer (born 31 March 1978) is a guitarist, composer, and arranger from the Netherlands. A member of the Dutch Sinti-Romani, he considers Django Reinhardt his idol. He has worked with Stochelo Rosenberg, Fapy Lafertin, Tim Kliphuis, Jimmy Rosenberg, Dominique Paats, Biréli Lagrène, and Andreas Öberg.

== Career ==
Schäfer was born in Gerwen, Nuenen into a Dutch Sinti community that was the home of Jimmy Rosenberg and Stochelo Rosenberg. This tradition of gypsy jazz was started by Wasso Grünholz. He replaced Jimmy Rosenberg as the leader of the band Gipsy Kids.

In 2001 he formed the Paulus Schäfer Gipsy Band with rhythm guitarist Sendelo Schäfer, bassist Jozua Rosenberg, and violinist Martien Wagner in 2001. They recorded their debut album Into the Light during the next year. Soon after the release of this album, Jozua Rosenberg left the group to concentrate on flamenco guitar and was replaced by Rinus Steinbach. In 2006, while recording Desert Fire, Steinbach was replaced by Noah Schafer.

Paulus Schäfer performed at the DjangoFest NorthWest, Langley WA (US), Django in June, Northampton, Massachusetts; Sziget Festival (Budapest); Khamoro (Prague), International Gypsy Guitar Festival (Gossington UK), Festival Django Reinhardt (France), Gipsy Festival Angers (FR), and the International Gipsyfestival (NL).

== Discography ==
- Twelfth Year (Moncq, 2012)
- Rock Django with Tim Kliphuis (Lowland, 2012)
- Letter to Van Gogh (Sinti Music, 2015)

== See also ==
- Django Reinhardt
- Dutch jazz
- Gypsy jazz
- List of jazz guitarists
- Romani people
- Sinti
