= Hans Mossel =

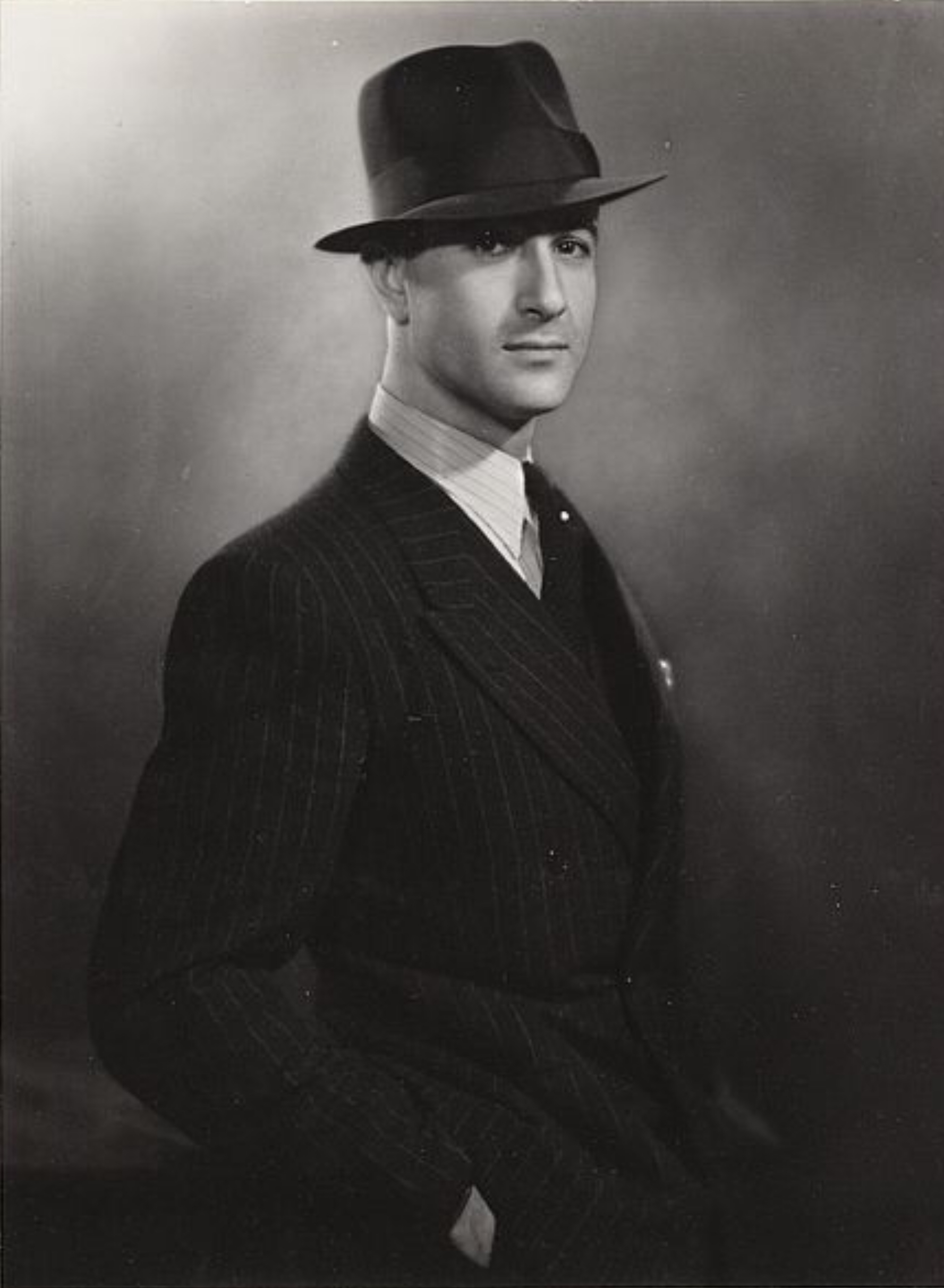
- Hans Mossel, 1937.

Background information
- Born: Henri Emile Mossel; December 24, 1905; Amsterdam, Netherlands
- Died: August 4, 1944 (aged 38) Auschwitz, German-occupied Poland
- Genres: Jazz; swing
- Occupations: Musician; bandleader; clarinetist; saxophonist
- Instruments: Clarinet, Saxophone
- Years active: 1923–1941

Henri Emile "Hans" Mossel (Amsterdam, 24 December 1905 – Auschwitz, German-occupied Poland, 4 August 1944) was a Dutch clarinetist and saxophonist.

== 1905–1935: Early years ==
Hans Mossel was born into a very musical Jewish family. He was the son of a well-known Dutch cellist Isaäc Mossel (Rotterdam, 1870 – Amsterdam, 1923) and pianist Jeannette Belinfante (1868-1925). He spent his youth with his parents in Laren in the Netherlands, where he lived on the Velthuijsenlaan. At a young age he was taught to play the piano. His father stimulated his love for jazz. In 1923 Mossel played as a drummer and pianist in the “Larensche Jazz Band”. A couple of years later he formed his own jazz band “The Indian Jazz Band”. In 1931 Mossel was employed by the German violinist and bandleader Marek Weber and moved to Germany.

Because he was Jewish, Weber was targeted by the Nazis who wanted to suppress the so called degenerate music (German: Entartete Musik), a label which had also been applied to jazz music. This was meant to isolate, discredit and ultimately ban this form of music. Towards the end of 1932 Marek left Germany and travelled via London to the United States. Mossel returned to the Netherlands.

== The last ten years from 1935 until 1944 ==
Hans Mossel was considered to be among the most notable clarinetists and saxophonists performing in Europe. In 1935 Mossel was employed by the Dutch broadcasting company the AVRO as a bandleader for the AVRO Dance Orchestra. In 1939 Mossel married Ada Elizabeth van Ollefen. They had two children. Shortly after the beginning of World War II life became very difficult for Hans Mossel. Although married to a non-Jewish woman, he was forced by the Nazis to fill bomb craters at Schiphol airport, which was used as a German military airfield called Fliegerhorst 561 and as a result regularly attacked by the Allied Forces. On 13 December 1943, 199 American planes dropped about 1600 bombs (about 400.000 kilos) on Fliegerhorst 561, after which it could no longer be used by the Germans.

On the basis of a trumped-up case of sabotage Hans Mossel was sent on 9 March 1944 to the Westerbork transit camp. On 23 March 1944 Mossel was deported to the Monowitz concentration camp, also called Auschwitz III, which was part of the Auschwitz concentration camp in Nazi German-occupied Poland. Monowitz was set up at the request of the chemical factory IG Farben to provide slave labour. The German manufacturer Krupp also used slave labour provided by Monowitz. Hans Mossel was forced to work for IG Farben. The life expectancy for these slave labourers at IG Farben was three to four months. As a result of exhaustion and dysentery Mossel died on 4 August 1944. There is a short biography of Mossel written by Herman Openneer (1935-2017), one of the founders of the Dutch Jazz Archive.

== Sources ==
- Herman Openneer (1935-2017), 1993.
- Jewish Biographical Dictionary.
- Peter Dempsey, Marek Weber: His Violin and His Orchestra, 2011.
