= The Ramblers (band) =

Music ensemble associated with jazz and Swing Era music

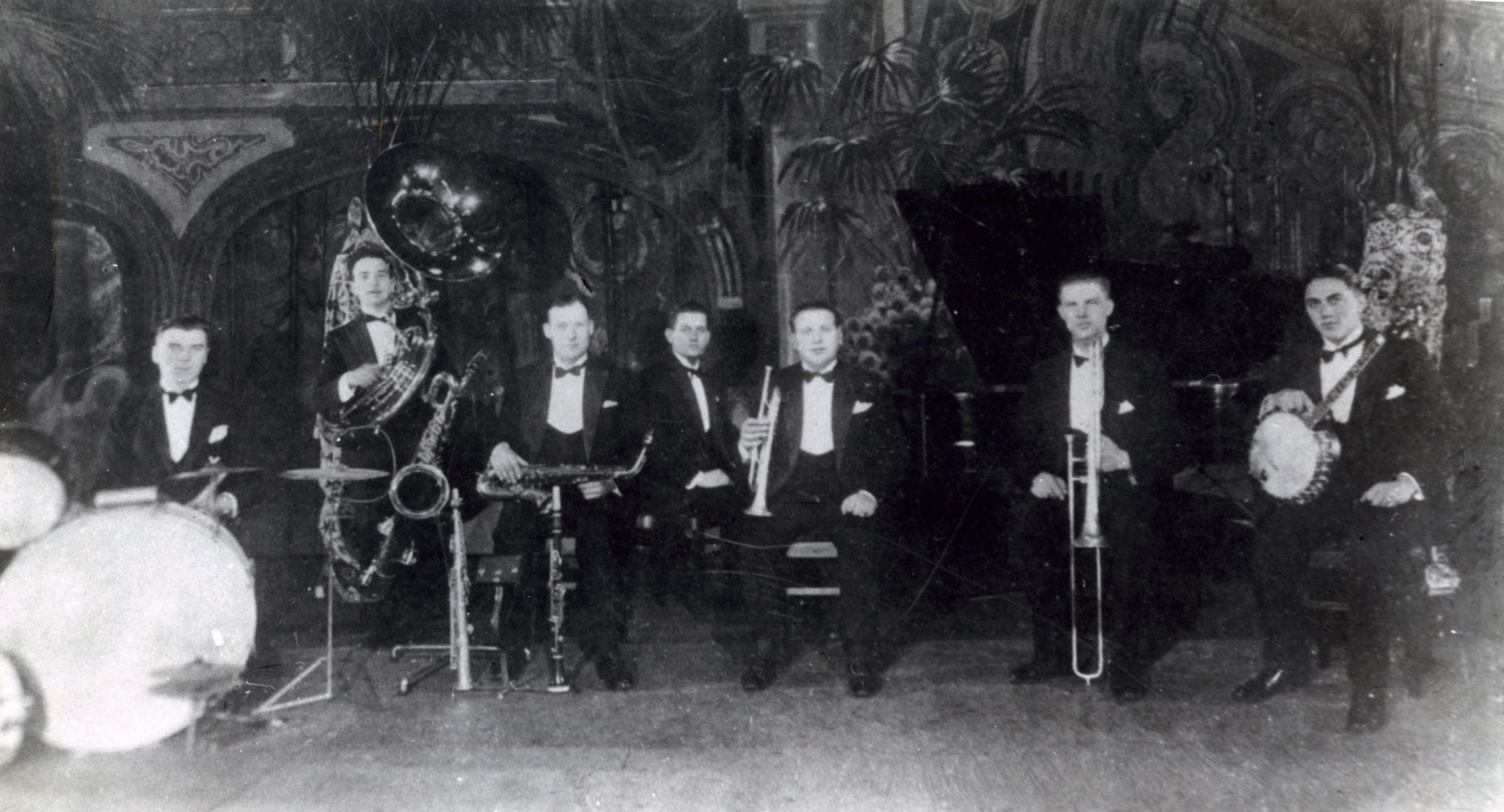
- The Ramblers, 1926

Background information
- Origin: Netherlands
- Genres: Jazz; big band; swing; progressive jazz; easy listening; lounge
- Years active: 1926–1964, 1974–1998
- Past members: Original period: Theo Uden Masman; Louis De Vries; Piet Noordijk; Ack van Rooyen; Jozef Cleber; Relaunch: Jack Bulterman; Marcel Thielemans

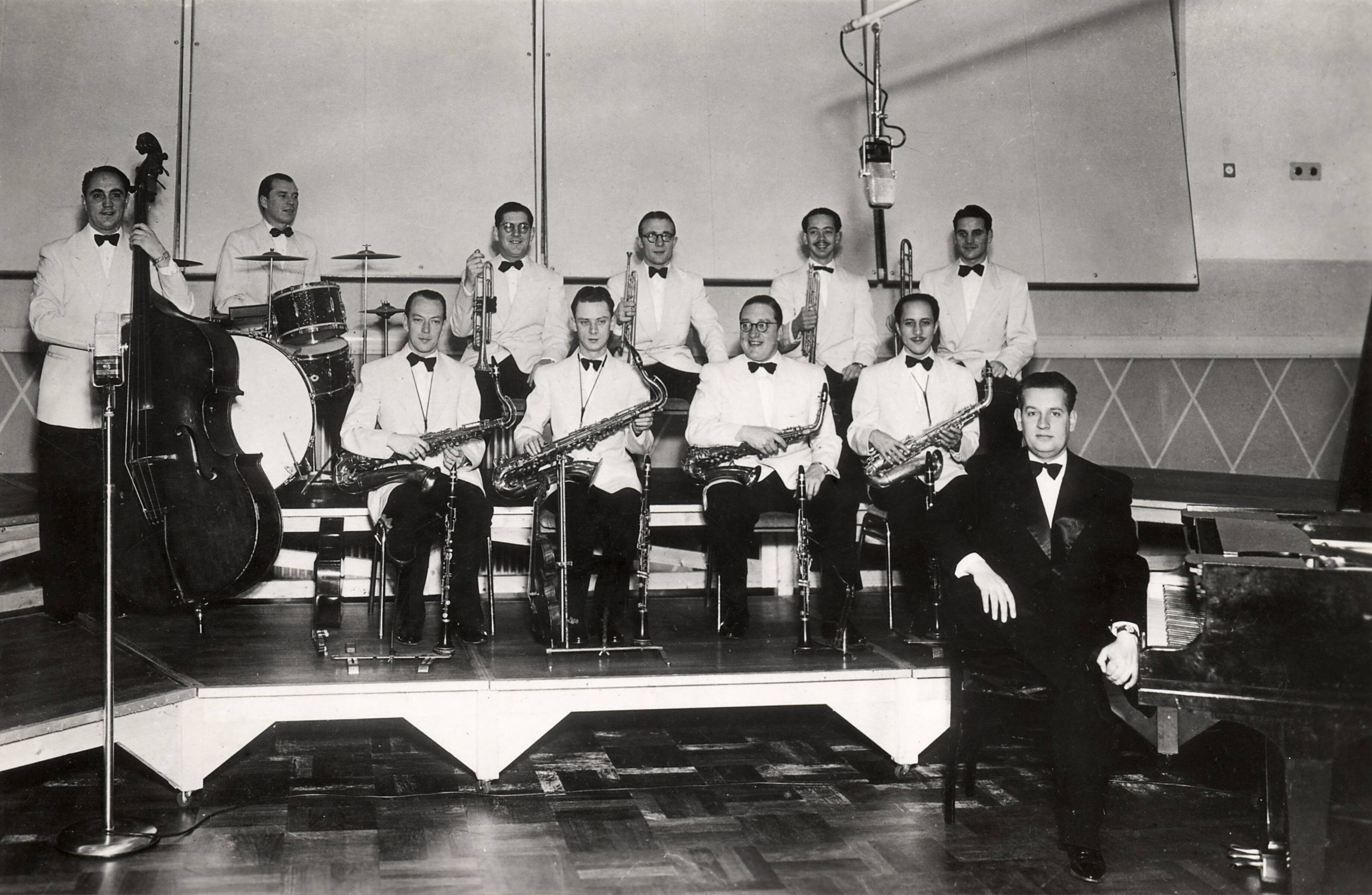
The Ramblers, 1940.

The Ramblers was the name of a jazz and dance music orchestra from the Netherlands, active 1926 to 1964, and again with a different ensemble from 1974 to 1998. It was a popular Dutch radio big band in the 1930s and 1940s and instrumental in popularizing jazz music in the Low Countries.

Over the years, the group's members were Theo Uden Masman (bandleader from 1926 until 1964), Louis De Vries, Piet Noordijk, Ack van Rooyen, and Jozef Cleber. Because The Ramblers had played for the Germans during the Nazi occupation of the Netherlands between 1940 and 1945, Theo Uden Masman was not allowed to lead his big band for a period of one year, until 5 May 1946. The band appeared on the radio during the 1960s with singer Joke Bruijs. The final performance of Theo Uden Masman and the Ramblers was on 11 April 1964. The band’s significant role during the Second World War and the liberation of the Netherlands by Allied forces has been examined in recent scholarly literature on Dutch liberation songs.

Jack Bulterman and Marcel Thielemans relaunched The Ramblers in 1974. Their last performance was in the Netherlands in 1998.

Their 1941 song "Dag Schatteboutje" was featured in the 2016 film Riphagen.

== Bibliography ==
- Co de Kloet en Gabri de Wagt: Mooi Holland. de woelige jaren van een legendarisch orkest, dat 38 jaar optrad onder de naam, The Ramblers. 1981, ISBN 9789061414032
- Frank Mehring, Songs of Liberation in the Netherlands. The Transatlantic Soundtrack of Freedom. Routledge, 2025. ISBN 978-90-485-7021-8
