= Rosenberg Trio =

Dutch jazz band

The Rosenberg Trio
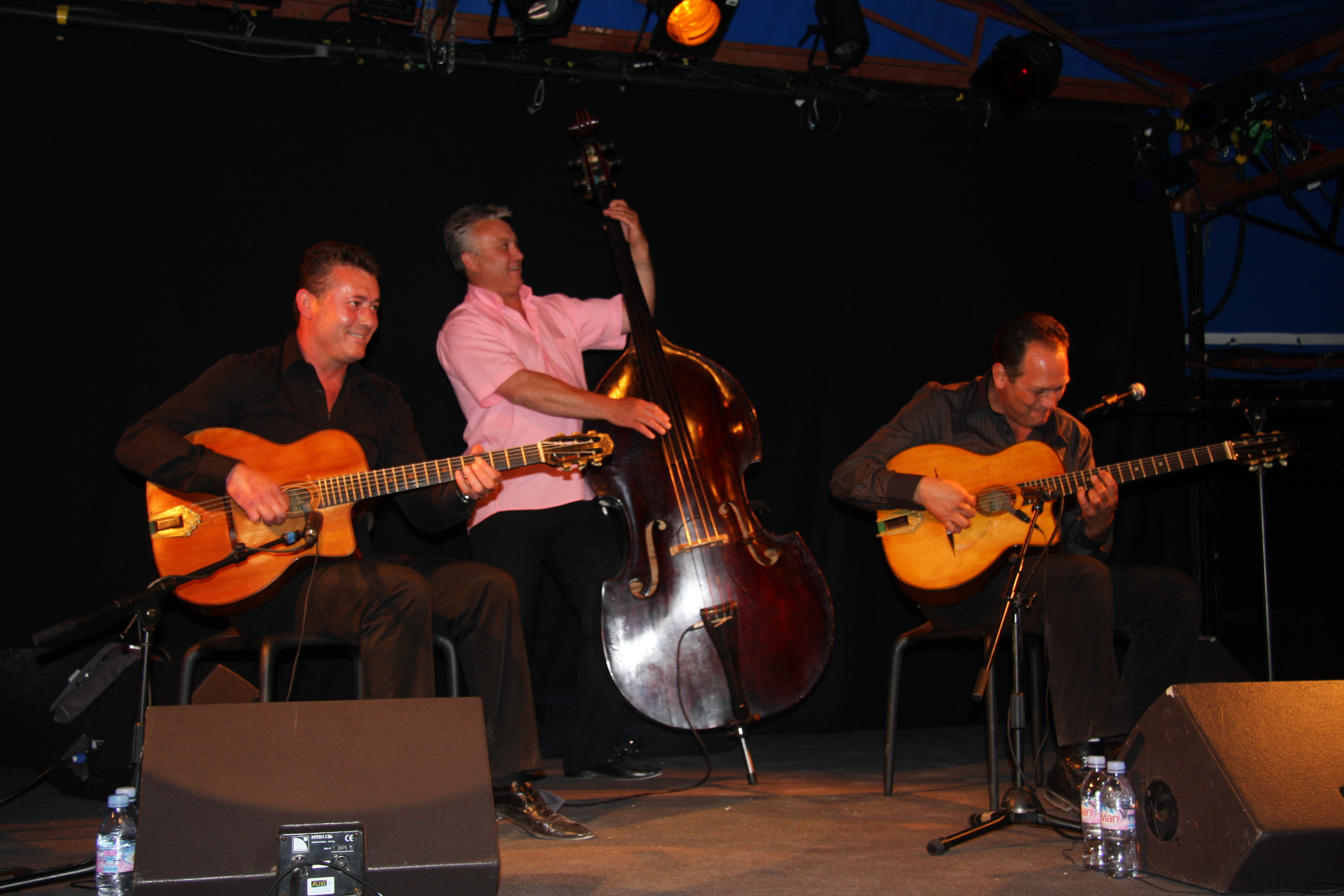

Background information
- Genres: Chamber jazz, gypsy jazz
- Years active: 1989–present
- Labels: Dino Music, Enja, FMM, Harlekijn, Iris, Polydor, Universal, Verve
- Members: Stochelo Rosenberg; Nous'che Rosenberg; Nonnie Rosenberg
- Website: www.therosenbergtrio.info

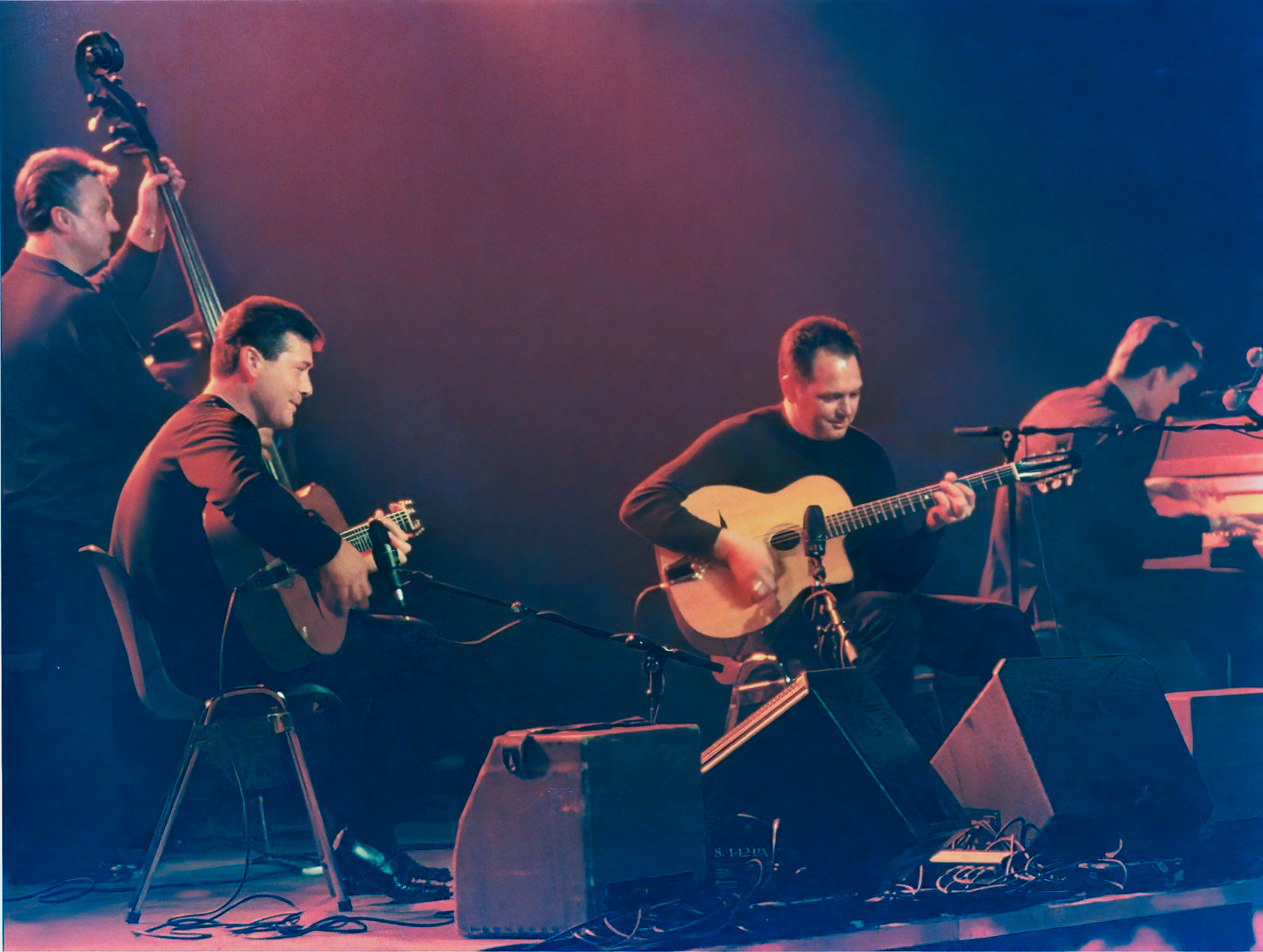
The Rosenberg Trio performing with guest pianist Peter Beets in the Netherlands, 2002

The Rosenberg Trio is a Dutch jazz band consisting of lead guitarist Stochelo Rosenberg, rhythm guitarist Nous'che Rosenberg and bassist Nonnie Rosenberg. The band is influenced by Django Reinhardt, the gypsy jazz guitarist of the 1930s.

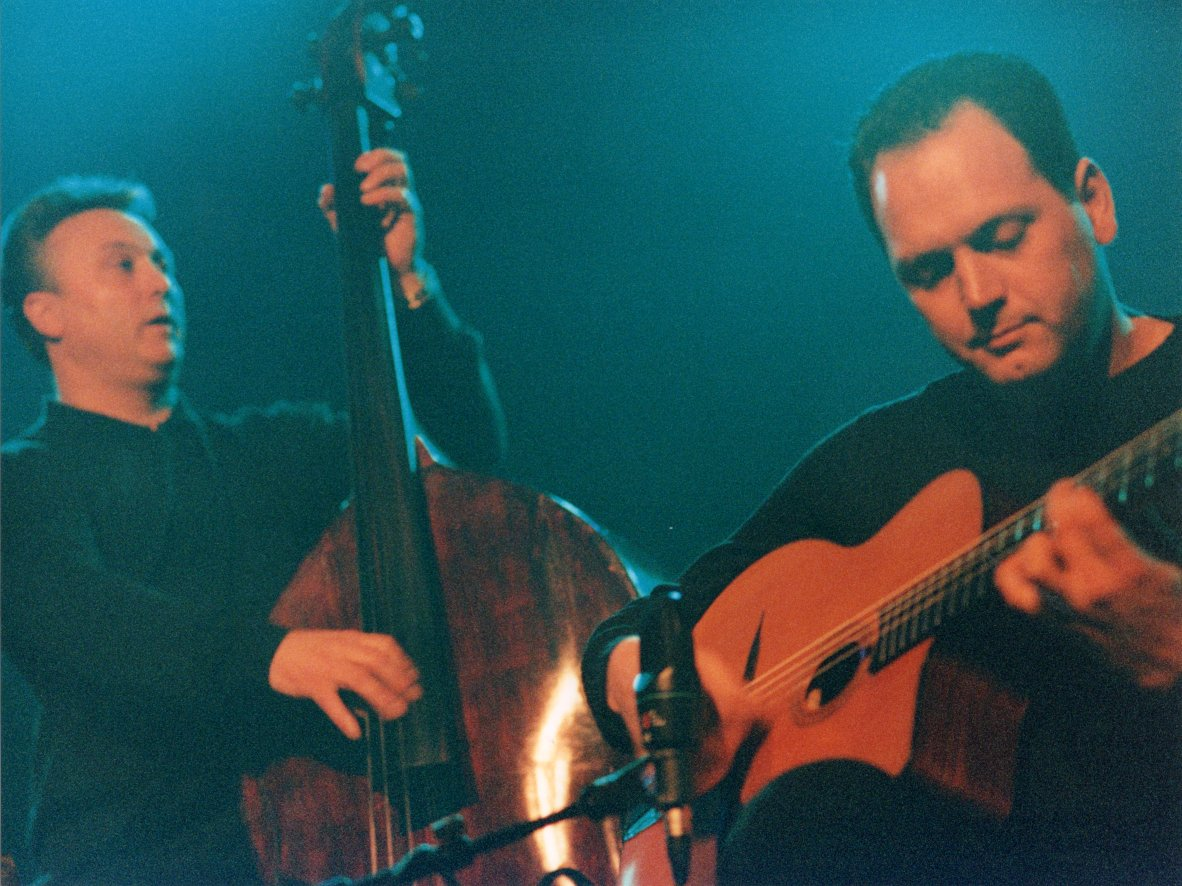
Nonnie and Stochelo Rosenberg on stage, Netherlands 2002

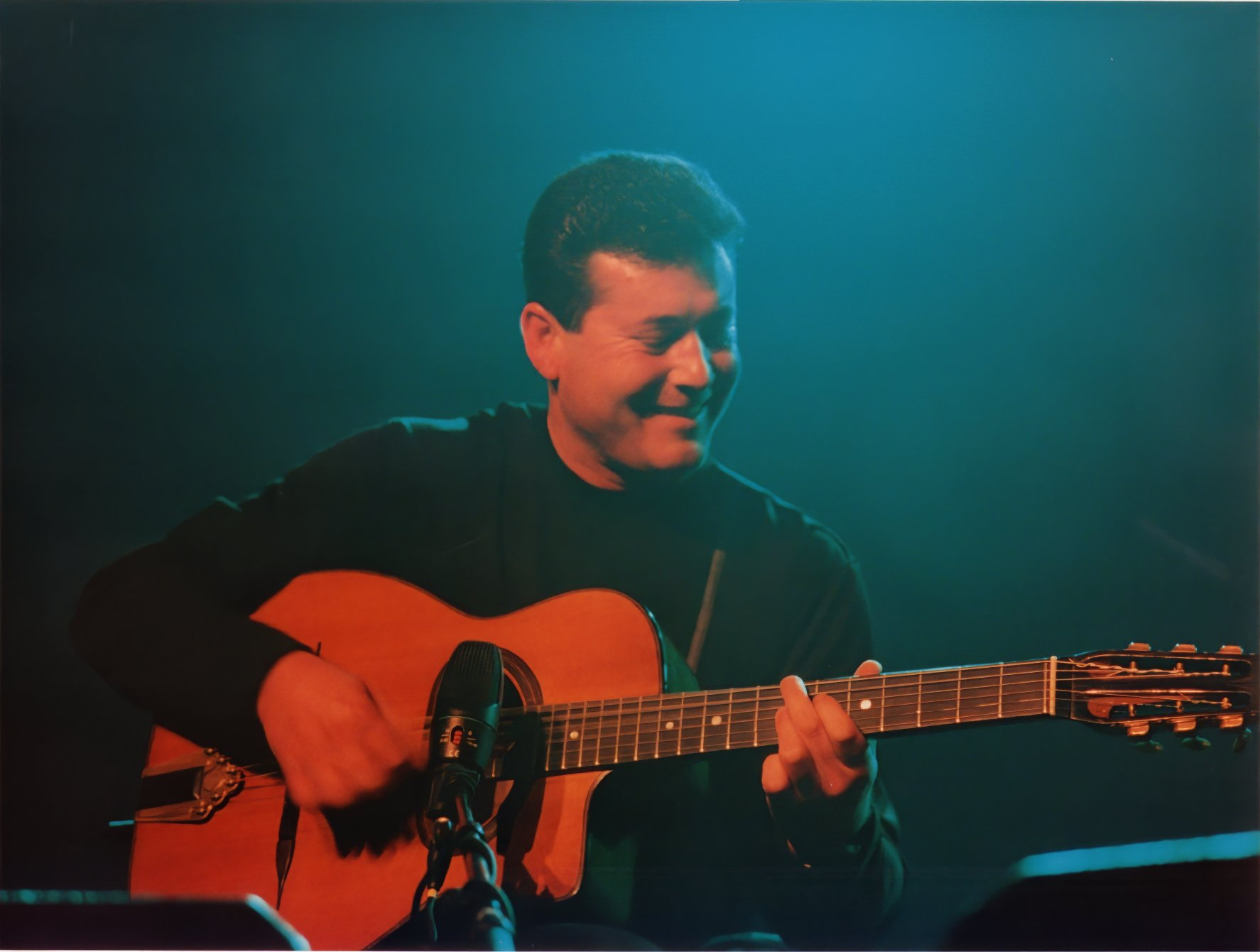
Nous'che Rosenberg, Netherlands 2002

The group's first album was Seresta in 1989. Notable events include the release in 2010 of Djangologists a DVD featuring a recording tribute to Django Reinhardt, and the 1992 live album The Rosenberg Trio: Live at the North Sea Jazz Festival, which captured the trio at an eclectic, youthful high point.

There is no exact date before 1989 when the Rosenberg Trio began playing under that name. Two of the Rosenbergs, Nous'che and Nonnie, are sons of Sani Rosenberg, a musician in the Dutch Gypsy community. Having been raised in a very musical family, they all were influenced by the music of Django Reinhardt.

Nous'che started playing with his cousin and buddy, Stochelo Rosenberg, when Stochelo was about 10 years old.

Nous'che and Stochelo both own Selmer guitars: Nous'che a "D-hole" and Stochelo an "oval-hole" (which was the model Django Reinhardt favoured).

Despite being surrounded by guitarists at a young age, Nonnie was encouraged to play the double bass in part of his family band. This compelled Nonnie to heavily practice, leading to his mastery of the instrument.

They have played with other influential musicians such as Angelo Debarre, Romane, Bireli Lagrene, and Peter Beets.

== Discography ==
- Seresta (Hot Club Records, 1990)
- Gipsy Summer (Polydor, 1991)
- Impressions (Dino Music, 1992)
- 85 and Still Swinging with Stephane Grappelli (Angel, 1993)
- Live at the North Sea Jazz Festival '92 (Verve/Polydor, 1993)
- Caravan (Verve, 1994)
- Swinging Favourites of '45 (Quintessence, 1995)
- Noches Calientes (Polydor, 1998)
- Je Zoenen Zijn Zoeter with Herman van Veen (Polydor, 1999)
- Deine Kusse Sind Susser with Herman van Veen (Polydor, 1999)
- Tes Bisous Sont Plus Doux with Herman van Veen (Harlekijn, 2000)
- So This Is My Baby with Herman van Veen (Harlekijn, 2000)
- Your Kisses Are Sweeter with Herman van Veen (Harlekijn, 2000)
- Suenos Gitanos (Polydor, 2001)
- Louis van Dijk & the Rosenberg Trio Live (Pink, 2003)
- Live in Samois Tribute to Django Reinhardt (Universal, 2003)
- Roots (Iris Music, 2007)
- Tribute to Stephane Grappelli (FM Jazz, 2008)
- Cor Goes Gipsy (Foreign Media Music, 2008)
- Djangologists (Enja, 2010)
- La Familia (Coast Music, 2015)
- Django (Impulse!, 2017)

== Notable live performances (live albums) ==
- North Sea Jazz Festival (1992)
- Carnegie Hall - The 85th Birthday Concert (1993)
- Samois (2003)
