= Stochelo Rosenberg =

Dutch Gypsy jazz guitarist

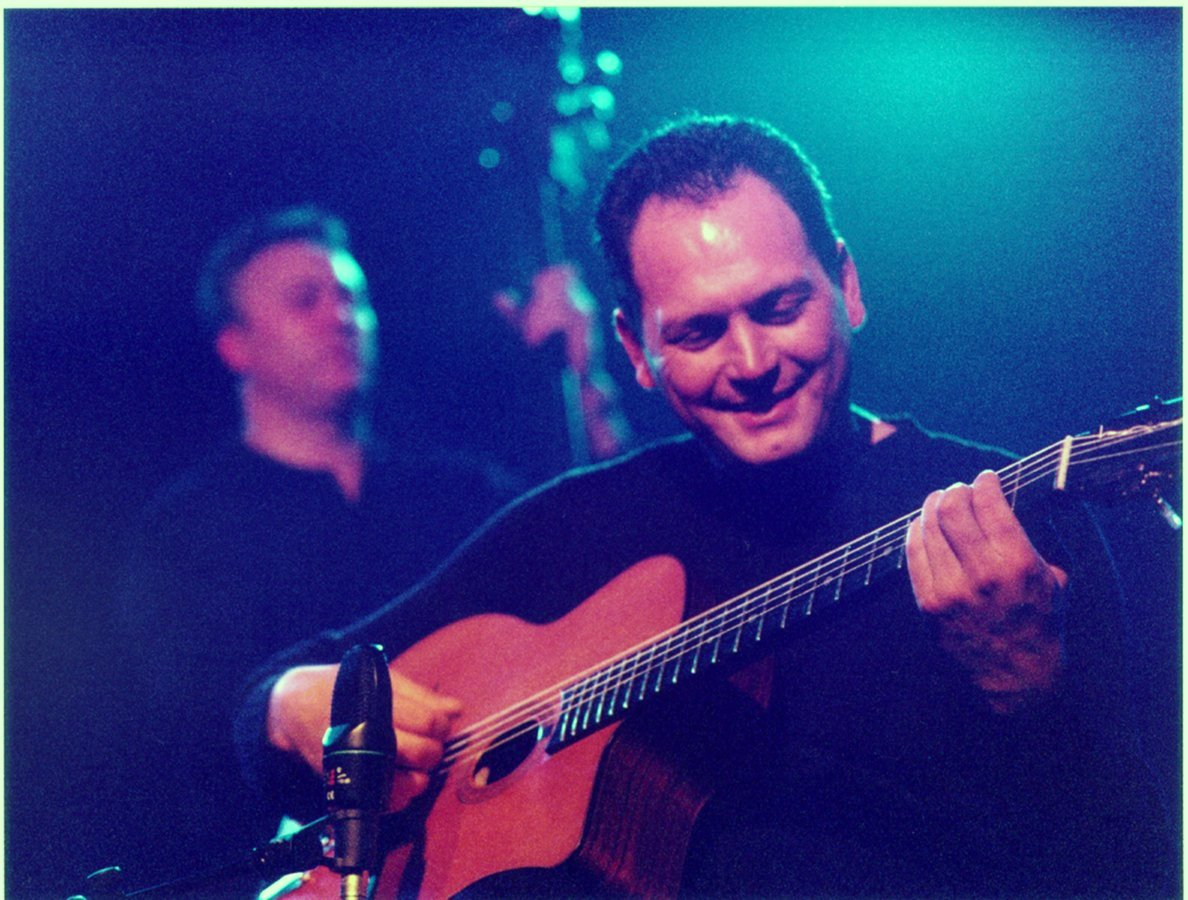
- Stochelo Rosenberg in concert, Netherlands, 2002

Background information
- Born: February 19, 1968 (age 58); Helmond, Netherlands
- Genres: Gypsy jazz, swing
- Occupation: Musician
- Instrument: Guitar
- Years active: 1980s – present
- Member of: Rosenberg Trio
- Website: www.therosenbergtrio.info

Stochelo Rosenberg (born 19 February 1968) is a Gypsy jazz guitarist who leads the Rosenberg Trio.

== Biography ==
Rosenberg started playing guitar when he was ten years old. A member of the Sinti, he heard music often at home and from relatives. With his cousins Nonnie Rosenberg and Nous'che Rosenberg he started the Rosenberg Trio in 1989, playing in the annual Django Reinhardt festival in Samois. In the 1990s they accompanied Stephane Grappelli on tour and recorded with him, including a concert at Carnegie Hall that celebrated his 85th birthday.

He started the Rosenberg Academy, an online school devoted to teaching Gypsy jazz.

== Discography ==
=== As leader ===
- Seresta (Hot Club, 1990)
- Elegance with Romane (Iris Music, 2000)
- Double Jeu with Romane (Iris Music, 2004)
- Ready 'n' Able (Iris Music, 2005)
- Gypsy Guitar Masters with Romane (Iris Music, 2006)
- Tribulations with Romane (Universal, 2010)

With the Rosenberg Trio

- Gipsy Summer (Universal, 1991)
- Impressions (Universal, 1992)
- Caravan (Universal, 1994)
- Live at the North Sea Jazz Festival '92 (Universal, 1993)
- Gipsy Swing (Universal, 1995)
- Noches Calientes (Universal, 1998)
- Deine Kusse Sind Susser with Herman van Veen (Polydor, 1999)
- Je Zoenen Zijn Zoeter with Herman van Veen (Polydor, 1999)
- Suenos Gitanos (Universal, 2001)
- Live in Samois (Universal, 2003)
- Louis Van Dijk and the Rosenberg Trio Live (Pink, 2003)
- Roots (Iris Music, 2007)
- Tribute to Stephane Grappelli (FM Jazz, 2008)
- Cor Goes Gipsy with Cor Bakker (Foreign Media Music, 2008)
- Djangologists (Enja, 2010)
- La Familia (Coast Music, 2015)
- Django (Impulse!, 2017)

=== As sideman ===
- BZN, The Best Days of My Life (Mercury, 1999)
- Boulou Ferre, Elios Ferre, Angelo Debarre, Django 100 (Jms, 2009)
- Laura Fygi, Rendez-Vous (Universal, 2007)
- Stephane Grappelli, 85 and Still Swinging (Angel, 1993)
- Bireli Lagrene, Gipsy Project & Friends (Dreyfus, 2002)
- The Manhattan Transfer, Swing (Atlantic, 1997)
- Paulus Schafer, Twelfth Year (Moncq, 2012)
- Paulus Schafer, Letter to Van Gogh (Sinti Music, 2015)
- Joscho Stephan, Guitar Heroes (MGL/In Akustik 2015)
