= Gool =

Gool may refer to:

- Gool (game), a terms used in some variations of the game "tag"
- Gool, Jammu and Kashmir, a community in Ramban district
- Gool Nasikwala, Indian female table tennis player
- Zainunnisa Gool (1897–1963), South African political and civil rights leader
- Game Object Oriented Lisp (GOOL), a Lisp dialect designed by Andy Gavin

== See also ==
- Van Gool, a Dutch surname (includes a list of people with the name)
- Ghoul (disambiguation)
- Goole (disambiguation)
