= Feyenoord =

Association football club in the Netherlands

Coordinates: 51°53′N 4°31′E

- Full name: Feyenoord Rotterdam
- Nicknames: De club aan de Maas (The Club on the Meuse); De Stadionclub (The Stadium Club); De club van het volk (The Club of the People); De Trots van Zuid (The Pride of South)
- Founded: 19 July 1908; 118 years ago (as Wilhelmina)
- Stadium: De Kuip
- Capacity: 47,500
- Chairman: Toon van Bodegom
- Head coach: Giovanni van Bronckhorst
- League: Eredivisie
- 2025–26: Eredivisie, 2nd of 18
- Website: feyenoord.com
Home colours	Away colours	Third colours

Feyenoord Rotterdam ([ˈfɛiənoːrt]) is a Dutch professional football club based in Rotterdam, which plays in the Eredivisie, the top tier in Dutch football. Founded as Wilhelmina in 1908, the club changed to various names before settling on being called after its neighbourhood in 1912 as SC Feijenoord, updated in 1974 to SC Feyenoord, and then to Feyenoord in 1978, when it split from the amateur club under its wing, SC Feyenoord. Since 1937, Feyenoord's home ground has been the Stadion Feijenoord, nicknamed De Kuip (The Tub), the second largest stadium in Netherlands.

Feyenoord is one of the most successful clubs in Dutch football, winning 16 Dutch football championships, 14 KNVB Cups, and 5 Johan Cruyff Shields. Internationally, the club has won one European Cup, two UEFA Cups, and one Intercontinental Cup. The club has played continuously in the top ten of the Dutch football system since gaining promotion to Eerste Klasse (the Eredivisie's forerunner competition) in 1921, more times than any other club in the country, including the likes of Ajax and PSV Eindhoven. Along with Ajax and PSV Eindhoven, Feyenoord is one of the country's "big three" clubs that have dominated the Eredivisie.

Feyenoord is known as a people's club with large national support. Its most successful period was the 1960s and 1970s, when Coen Moulijn, Willem van Hanegem and Ove Kindvall led the club to six league titles, two European trophies, and an Intercontinental Cup, thereby becoming the first Dutch club in history to win both the European Cup and the Intercontinental Cup. In the 21st century, Feyenoord ended an 18-year league title drought in 2017 and won the 2002 UEFA Cup against Borussia Dortmund in its home stadium, which makes them the only team from the Netherlands to win a European trophy this century.

Feyenoord has a longstanding rivalry with Ajax, a clash between two teams from the two biggest cities in the Netherlands, called De Klassieker ("The Classic"). The club's anthem is "Hand in Hand". The home shirt colours are red and white split down the middle with both the shorts and socks being black. Feyenoord is a multi-sports club, including Sportclub Feyenoord (amateur football team), Feyenoord Futsal and Feyenoord Handball.

== History ==
=== Foundation ===
The first logo (1912)

The football club Wilhelmina was founded in the pub De Vereeniging on 19 July 1908 and played in blue-sleeved red shirts and white shorts. Between 1908, 1910, 1911, and 1912, the club underwent a series of changes of name and team colours, becoming Hillesluise Football Club in 1909, and then RVV Celeritas. Upon earning promotion to the National football association in 1912, the club renamed to SC Feijenoord (after the city district in which the team was founded), and changed uniform once again, adopting the red and white shirts, black shorts and black socks that they still wear today. In 1917, Feijenoord were promoted to the highest level of Dutch football and moved to the ground Kromme Zandweg.

=== First successes ===
After 16 years the formation of the club, and a mere three years after they were promoted for the second time to the highest level of Dutch football, Feijenoord earned their first honours by capturing the national league championship in 1924. The team enjoyed a string of successes in the latter half of the decade, taking divisional titles in 1926, 1927, 1928 and 1929, and winning their second national championship in 1928.

Feijenoord won their first Dutch Cup in 1930 by scoring the only goal in a derby final against Excelsior. They continued to dominate their division with three consecutive titles, but were winless in subsequent championship finals. Five years after their first cup win, Feijenoord took the prize for a second time in 1935, by beating HVV Helmond.

Feijenoord started to attract more fans to their stadium at Kromme Zandweg, and in 1933, they decided to build a new facility. The club moved to the Feijenoord Stadion (nicknamed "De Kuip" or "the Tub") in 1937, playing the first match there on 27 March against Beerschot. During this period Feijenoord won three consecutive division titles from 1936 to 1938, with their third and fourth national championships coming in 1936 and 1938.

During World War II, Feijenoord played their matches at Sparta Rotterdam's Kasteel, as the Nazis had occupied De Kuip. When Het Kasteel was unavailable due to clashes with Sparta fixtures, Feijenoord played at their former ground, the Kromme Zandweg.

Feijenoord again won a division title with a national championship in 1940, their fifth Dutch title. During the German occupation of the Netherlands, play continued in Dutch football leagues, though the 1945 championship was cancelled as the war came to its conclusion. During this period, Feijenoord's only trophy was a divisional championship in 1943. After the war, Feijenoord did not perform as well as they had in previous decades, not seriously challenging in their division and so missing the national playoff rounds.

On 30 June 1954, the chairmen of the three biggest Rotterdam teams organised a meeting in Utrecht, which was attended by several chairmen of other clubs and a delegation of the KNVB to discuss the start of professional football in the Netherlands. The professional era commenced with the first Eredivisie season in 1954/1955. Feijenoord were one of the clubs participating in the inaugural Eredivisie and have never been relegated. One of the most memorable matches in these first years of professional football was the clash between Feijenoord and the Volewijckers at 2 April 1956, which Feijenoord won 11–4, with nine goals by Henk Schouten. Feijenoord would grow an intense rivalry with Ajax. Matches between the two clubs quickly were dubbed as de Klassieker ("The Classic"). The first memorable Klassieker from a Feijenoord point of view took place at 11 November 1956, when Daan den Bleijker scored four times to give Feijenoord a 7–3 win over their archrivals.

=== Golden era ===
Feijenoord claimed their first professional Eredivisie Championship and their sixth Dutch Championship in 1961. On the road to the title Ajax was beaten 9–5 in De Kuip, four of Feijenoord's goals were scored by Henk Schouten. The following season, they played their first European Cup match facing IFK Göteborg. The Swedes were beaten 0–3 in Gothenburg and 8–2 in Rotterdam. Feijenoord were eliminated by Tottenham Hotspur in the following round. In 1962, Feijenoord successfully defended their Dutch Championship title and reached the final of the Intertoto Cup 1961–62. where Feijenoord faced arch-rival Ajax in the final and subsequently lost 4–2.

On 12 December 1962, Feijenoord played a decisive match versus Vasas in the second round of the 1962–63 European Cup. The first two legs, in Rotterdam and Budapest, both ended in a 1–0 home victory, forcing a replay on a neutral ground to take place. The match was played in Antwerp, where 30,000 Feijenoord fans travelled by bus to see their team play. Also this time, the final score was 1–0; Rinus Bennaars scored the only goal and was immediately nicknamed "The Hero of Deurne", reflecting the neighbourhood in Antwerp where the match was played. The events in Antwerp resulted in an enduring friendly relationship between the fans of Feijenoord and Royal Antwerp.

In 1963, hundreds of thousands of people stood ashore by the Nieuwe Maas and the Nieuwe Waterweg to wave two ships, de Groote Beer and the Waterman goodbye. The ships transported thousands of Feijenoord fans to Lisbon where the club faced Benfica on 8 May 1963 in the European Cup semi-finals. The first leg, held in Rotterdam a month earlier, finished 0–0. Despite Feijenoord eventually losing the match 3–1, this turned out to be the start of the most successful period in the club's history. Feijenoord won the double for the first time in their history in 1965, and managed to win another double a few years later in 1969. The 1965 title secured Feijenoord a spot in the 1965–66 European Cup, where they faced multiple cup champion Real Madrid on 8 September 1965. During the match, Hans Kraay had to leave the pitch injured after 31 minutes, without being substituted. He returned at the start of the second half and scored the goal which resulted in a 2–1 win. During the match, fans' favourite Coen Moulijn was attacked by a Spanish defender. Moulijn then proceeded to chase the defender down the pitch, leading other players, and even fans who entered the pitch, to do the same. The referee could do nothing but to suspend the match at 2–1 in Feijenoord's favour. Two weeks later, Real Madrid comfortably beat Feijenoord 5–0 and eventually won the European Cup that season.

As the 1969 Dutch champions, Feijenoord participated in the 1969–70 European Cup. After winning against Knattspyrnufélag Reykjavíkur 16–2 on aggregate in the first round, the club faced Milan. Feijenoord lost the first leg 1–0 in Italy but overcame the loss in their own stadium with a 2–0 win, securing a place in the quarter-finals, where they faced ASK Vorwärts Berlin.

The tie followed the same pattern as the previous round: Feijenoord losing the first match 1–0 away, then winning 2–0 at home. In the semi-finals, Feijenoord beat Legia Warszawa 2–0 on aggregate, earning Feijenoord their first European final. Feijenoord faced Celtic in the final, held in the San Siro stadium in Milan. Goals by Tommy Gemmell and Rinus Israël resulted in a 1–1 draw after 90 minutes. Three minutes before the end of extra time, Ove Kindvall scored Feijenoord's winning goal, leading Feijenoord to be the first Dutch team to claim a major European trophy.

As reigning European champions, Feijenoord faced Estudiantes in the Intercontinental Cup. The first match in Buenos Aires at the La Bombonera finished in a 2–2 draw. Back in Rotterdam, Feijenoord managed a 1–0 victory (winning goal by Joop van Daele) to win the world club crown, the first Dutch team to do so. Estudiantes player Oscar Malbernat got frustrated and grabbed Van Daele's glasses and trampled on them. "You are not allowed to play with glasses... at least not in South America" was his excuse. As the cup holders, Feijenoord participated in the 1970–71 European Cup despite relinquishing the Dutch title, which was won by Ajax. Feijenoord were eliminated in the first round, following a surprise defeat by the Romanian team UTA Arad. In 1971, Feijenoord won their 10th Dutch Championship.

In 1974, the club changed their name from Feijenoord to Feyenoord, as people from outside the Netherlands did not know how to pronounce Dutch ij. Under their new name, they played in the 1973–74 UEFA Cup, reaching the final, following a 4–3 aggregate win over VfB Stuttgart in the semi-finals. The opponent in the final was Tottenham Hotspur. Spurs took a 2–1 lead in the first leg at White Hart Lane, but Theo de Jong equalised after 85 minutes and the match ended in a 2–2 draw. Feyenoord then won their match in Rotterdam 2–0, thanks to goals by Wim Rijsbergen and Peter Ressel, and also became the first Dutch team to win the UEFA Cup. As a result, Spurs fans started to riot, introducing Dutch football to the spectre of hooliganism in the process. The remainder of the decade saw Feyenoord win only one more honour: the Dutch Championship in 1974.

=== Falling out of contention ===
In 1978, the club divided their professional and amateur sides to form two separate teams, Feyenoord Rotterdam for professionals and SC Feyenoord for amateurs.

Feyenoord won their fifth Dutch Cup in 1980 by beating Ajax 3–1 in the final. In 1984, Feyenoord had another bright season, winning the double for the third time in their history. Key players in the squad from this period included Johan Cruyff, Ruud Gullit and Peter Houtman (who later became the Feyenoord stadium announcer). Cruyff reacted to Ajax's decision not to offer him a new contract at the start of the season and signed for archrivals Feyenoord instead. Cruyff's move to Rotterdam was criticised and increased Ajax's motivation to beat Feyenoord. In the Olympic Stadium of Amsterdam, Feyenoord suffered one of their most heavy defeats ever: 8–2. However, Feyenoord later defeated Ajax 4–1 in Rotterdam, and Ajax were subsequently beaten a second time in the Dutch Cup. Feyenoord proceeded to win a league and cup double by beating Fortuna Sittard in the cup final.

After the successful season, Feyenoord experienced a lean period and were unable to finish the season in a higher position than third. In the 1989–90 season, the club struggled to remain in the Eredivisie, but eventually managed to avoid relegation. The club had financial problems, and as a result, the staff was not able to recover and their main sponsor, HCS went bankrupt.

=== Back to winning silverware ===
When Wim Jansen was appointed as the interim manager to replace Günder Bengtsson and Pim Verbeek after a 6–0 defeat against PSV, the outlook began to improve for the club. PSV, the strongest Dutch club of the period, were knocked out of the KNVB Cup by a Henk Fräser goal in Eindhoven. Feyenoord progressed to the 1991 final, where they beat BVV Den Bosch 1–0 to win the competition. As the cup holders, they faced champions PSV again, this time in the 1991 Dutch Supercup, the first Supercup held since 1949. PSV were beaten 1–0 by a Marian Damaschin goal to add another honour to the club's achievements. They went on to win another Dutch Cup in 1992, beating Roda JC 3–0 in the final. The same year, Feyenoord reached the semi-finals in the 1991–92 European Cup Winners' Cup, beating Tottenham Hotspur in the quarter-finals, before being eliminated by Monaco on away goals, after two draws.

In 1993, Feyenoord secured another Dutch Championship by beating Groningen 5–0 in the last league match of the season. The match was played at the Oosterpark Stadion in Groningen, so 40.000 Feyenoord fans watched the game on giant screens in De Kuip. The title was followed by another two Dutch Cups in 1994 (beating NEC 2–1) and 1995 (beating Volendam 2–1). During the 1994–95 UEFA Cup Winners' Cup, Feyenoord reached the quarter-finals after beating Werder Bremen in the second round. They eventually lost to Real Zaragoza. In the quarter-finals of the 1995 KNVB Cup, Feyenoord visited Ajax, which would win the 1994–95 UEFA Champions League later that season. Ajax was leading 1–0 when Ruud Heus equalised with a penalty just before full-time. In extra time, Feyenoord became the only team to defeat Ajax the same season they won the Eredivisie and the Champions League unbeaten. The goal scored by Mike Obiku was the decider as the new golden goal rule became in use. During the 1995–96 UEFA Cup Winners' Cup, they defeated Everton and Borussia Mönchengladbach. A total of 14,000 Feyenoord fans travelled to Germany to support the team against Mönchengladbach. Feyenoord were eliminated in the semi-finals by a Carsten Jancker-inspired Rapid Wien.

Logo used from 1997 until 2008

Feyenoord made their UEFA Champions League debut in 1997–98, finishing third in their group behind Manchester United and Juventus. However, Juventus was beaten 2–0 in Rotterdam, with both Feyenoord goals scored by Julio Cruz. In 1998, the FIOD-ECD (Fiscal Information and Investigation Service/Economic Investigation Service) visited Feyenoord because of suspected fraud, mainly based on the signings of Aurelio Vidmar, Christian Gyan and Patrick Allotey. This became an ongoing scandal in following years, with club chairman Jorien van den Herik the main suspect. On 25 April 1999, Feyenoord secured their 14th Dutch Championship. 250,000 fans celebrated with the team in the center of Rotterdam. However, later in the evening, heavy rioting started. Prior to the start of the 1999–2000 season, Ajax were beaten in their own stadium when Feyenoord won their second Dutch Super Cup title after a free-kick goal by Patrick Paauwe secured a 3–2 win.

=== Another European prize ===
During the 1999–2000 season, Feyenoord participated in the Champions League for the second time. This time, the club managed to finish second in their group, behind Rosenborg and ahead of Borussia Dortmund. Feyenoord reached the second group stage and secured wins against Marseille (home) and Lazio (away). Chelsea won both clashes and, as a result, Feyenoord had to win their last group match away to Marseille to reach the knockout stages. The final result was 0–0, and Feyenoord were eliminated.

Feyenoord again participated in the Champions League in 2001–02, finishing third in a group containing Bayern Munich, Sparta Prague and Spartak Moscow. This meant Feyenoord continued their European season in the 2001–02 UEFA Cup instead of the second Champions League group stage. The disappointment of failing to reach the second group stage eventually resulted in optimism and celebration. By defeating SC Freiburg and Rangers, Feyenoord faced fellow Dutch club PSV in the quarter-finals. Both matches ended in 1–1 draws, and the clash went into extra time and a penalty shoot-out. Pierre van Hooijdonk, who had a superb season by scoring many free-kicks goals, secured Feyenoord's win by scoring a 90th-minute equalizer before finishing PSV off by scoring the last goal in the penalty shoot-out. A 1–0 win in Milan against Internazionale and a 2–2 return match in Rotterdam then earned Feyenoord a spot in the final, against Borussia Dortmund. Coincidentally, the final was held at De Kuip, and as a result, most spectators inside the stadium were Feyenoord fans. Feyenoord took a 2–0 lead after another free-kick goal and a penalty by Van Hooijdonk. Early in the second half, Márcio Amoroso scored a goal to make it 2–1. Jon Dahl Tomasson then made it 3–1. Dortmund only managed to score one more goal and the cup was won by Bert van Marwijk's Feyenoord. It is still the last time a Dutch team won a major European trophy.

A huge party erupted in and outside De Kuip not only because of the title, but also because the final was held several days after Rotterdam's political figure Pim Fortuyn was murdered. Many fans were still full of emotion, before and after the match. As a result of Fortuyn's murder, the cup was not officially celebrated in the city centre.

=== Inconsistent domestic results ===
The 2002 UEFA Cup win was the start of a long dry spell for Feyenoord. In the 2002–03 season, the club finish third in the Eredivisie, as well as reach the final of the KNVB Cup, which was lost 1–4 to Utrecht. However, in the following years, Feyenoord disappointed in both the Eredivisie and KNVB Cup.

In between, in 2002 Feyenoord and chairman Jorien van den Herik were both found not guilty. Following the prosecutor's appeal, and despite three years of investigations, the trial verdict was upheld. Nonetheless, the prosecution stated it would not yet abandon its case.

The 2005–06 season ended in disappointment for Feyenoord. The team pursued the Dutch championship for most of the season, but eventually lost out to champions PSV. The newly created Dutch play-offs then proved to be gloomy for Feyenoord. Ajax, which finished several points behind in the regular league, were Feyenoord's opponent in the play-offs. Ajax outclassed them and Feyenoord lost out on a Champions League place.

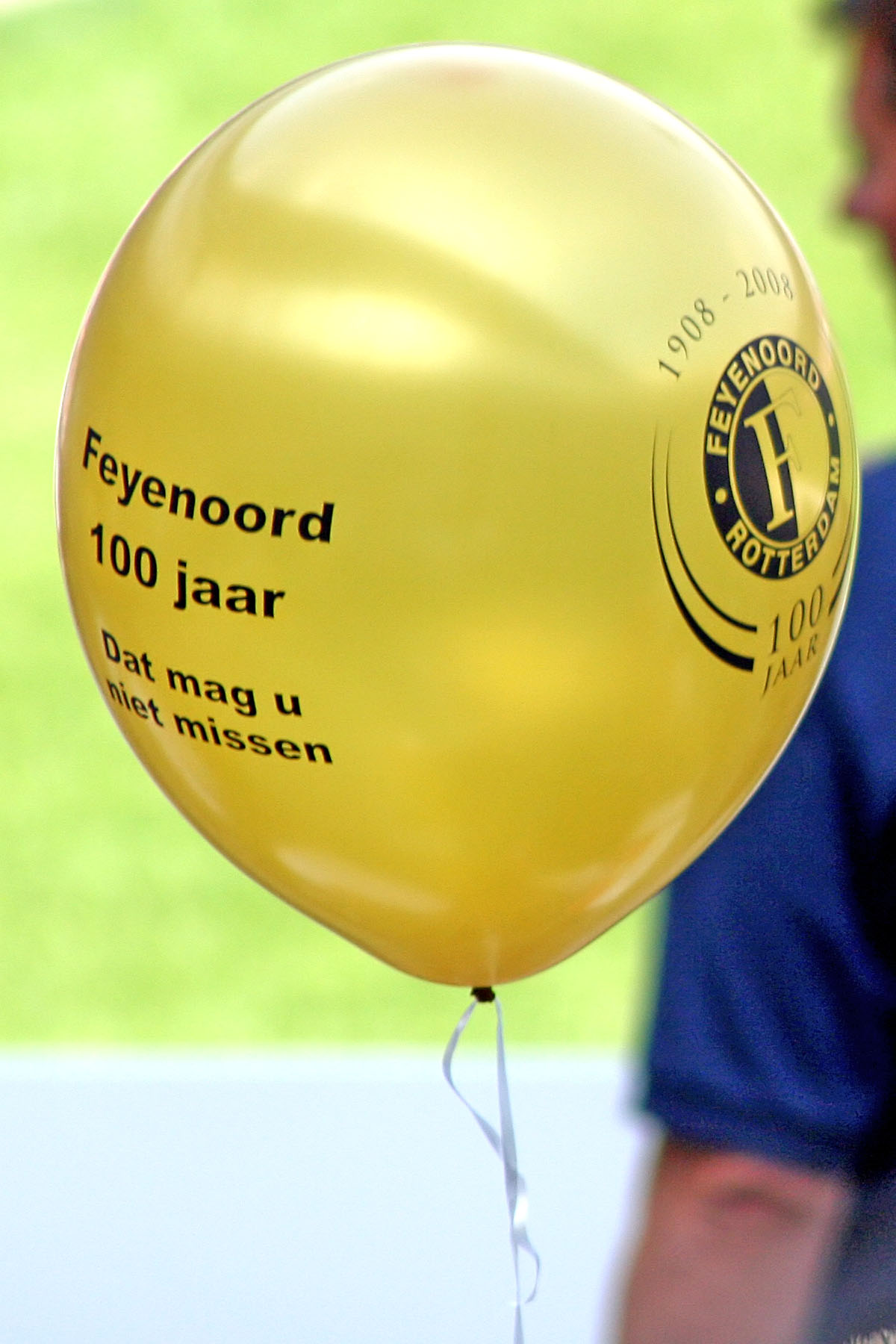
Feyenoord 100 Years Balloon

In the 2006–07 season, Feyenoord's supporters saw their two star players leave to Chelsea (Salomon Kalou) and Liverpool (Dirk Kuyt). At the same time, it became clear Feyenoord were in an appalling financial state despite earlier comments made by chairman Jorien van den Herik, who claimed that the club was financially healthy. Supporters' unrest grew into anger when Feyenoord bought Angelos Charisteas, a back-up striker of arch-rivals Ajax, with a poor track record, as a replacement for Dirk Kuyt. After continuous protests, Van den Herik resigned and the club began managerial reforms. Feyenoord were banned from European competition following hooliganism prior to and during a match against Nancy, despite an appeal by the club. The season ended in bitter disappointment with a seventh-place finish, causing Feyenoord to miss European football for the first time in 16 years. A brilliant performance from young Dutch left back Royston Drenthe at the 2007 UEFA European Under-21 Championship had investors flocking to the new investment schemes Feyenoord had established. The club appointed former manager Bert van Marwijk and was able to make a number of high-profile signings, including Giovanni van Bronckhorst and Roy Makaay. Despite the efforts, Feyenoord underperformed once again in the Eredivisie, finishing in a disappointing sixth place. The disappointment was relieved by claiming their first trophy in six years: 100 years after the foundation of the club, Feyenoord managed to win the KNVB Cup after defeating Roda JC 2–0. As Van Marwijk accepted a job as manager of the national team, Feyenoord appointed Gertjan Verbeek as their manager for the 2008–09 season.

=== Financial problems ===
Logo for the club's 100th birthday

In the 2008–09 season, Feyenoord celebrated their 100th birthday and organised many events throughout the year. The old "golden logo" returned as Feyenoord's official logo, which had earlier been presented at the 2007 New Year's brunch. During the summer, a historical tournament was held between Feyenoord and the three opponents they met in the European Cup finals – Borussia Dortmund, Tottenham Hotspur and Celtic – named the Feyenoord Jubilee Tournament.

Midway through the season, manager Verbeek was sacked due to disappointing league results. His assistant, Leon Vlemmings, took over as manager. The results in this period improved slightly, resulting in securing a spot in the playoffs for the final Dutch Europa League slot.

For the 2009–10 season, Feyenoord appointed former assistant manager and Feyenoord footballer Mario Been to take over from Vlemmings. Been, after achieving minor European successes with NEC, was considered the ideal candidate for the job. Former manager Leo Beenhakker, at the time manager of the Poland national team, took over as technical director. Partly because of this position, Beenhakker was able to attract more investors to the club, leading to some unexpected signings, including Sekou Cissé, Dani Fernández and Stefan Babović.

On 24 October 2010, Feyenoord lost heavily to PSV 10–0. In mid-January 2011, Beenhakker resigned after multiple clashes with the Feyenoord directors. His replacement was former Feyenoord player Martin van Geel, who at the time was working as technical director for fellow Eredivisie club Roda JC.

In July 2011, a majority of players in the squad voted to oust Been as club manager; 13 of 18 players voted they had lost all confidence in Been's ability to successfully manage the club. Been's subsequent sacking became global news, if only because reports of Been's firing quickly became a trending topic on Twitter, leaving people around the world to wonder who exactly Been was.

After Louis van Gaal turned down an offer to manage Feyenoord, the club approached former Barcelona defender Ronald Koeman, who had played for Feyenoord during the late 1990s. With his eventual hiring as manager, Koeman became the first to ever serve as both player and head coach at all teams of the so-called "traditional big three" of Dutch football: Ajax, PSV and Feyenoord. Moreover, he played and managed these teams in the same order.

=== Ronald Koeman era: revival with youth players ===
At the beginning of the 2011–12 season, Feyenoord lost valuable players such as Leroy Fer, Georginio Wijnaldum and André Bahia. In order to offset the departures, the club signed younger players like Jordy Clasie, Miquel Nelom, Guyon Fernandez and Kaj Ramsteijn. Two other players were brought on loan, John Guidetti from Manchester City and Otman Bakkal from PSV. Feyenoord started the season well and played the first match of the Eredivisie against fellow Rotterdam side Excelsior. Feyenoord ended the season by finishing second in the Eredivisie, thereby qualifying for the UCL third qualifying round.

On 16 December 2011, it was revealed that Feyenoord had been placed in the more favorable second category (Categorie 2), meaning Feyenoord were no longer in debt, according to the KNVB. They achieved the reclassification following the transfer of several significant players and a large capital injection made by the organisation VVF (Friends of Feyenoord, Vrienden Van Feyenoord). However, to remain in the second category, Feyenoord needed to obtain the same number of points earned, rounding up to at least 65 points. On 13 April 2012, Feyenoord was officially out of what has been described as the "financial dangerzone" and was officially placed in the second category. According to club chairman Eric Gudde, the placing in the more favourable category came earlier than anticipated; he also congratulated the fans and promised to maintain the same policy until Feyenoord was completely healthy again, saying the club will never fall back into the first category.

Despite no longer having to request permission from the KNVB to invest in new players, Feyenoord kept continuing the policy for the 2012–13 season, only contracting players who were either out of contract or available for a low transfer fee. John Goossens, Ruud Vormer and Daryl Janmaat were out of contract and signed a deal with Feyenoord over their respective prior clubs. Mitchell te Vrede played for the affiliated football club Excelsior, as well as for the highest-ranked academy team Jong Feyenoord/Excelsior and was promoted to the main senior team. Harmeet Singh and Lex Immers were the only two players whom Feyenoord paid a transfer fee for. Singh, a Norwegian midfielder and one of two non-Eredivisie players joining Feyenoord, was purchased from Vålerenga, while Immers joined from ADO Den Haag. The other non-Eredivisie player joining Feyenoord was Omar Elabdellaoui, who was brought in on loan from Manchester City.

On 2 July 2012, Karim El Ahmadi completed his transfer from Feyenoord to English Premier League club Aston Villa for an undisclosed fee believed to be in the region of €2.6 million. On 15 July, Aston Villa supports uploaded a picture on Twitter which showed Ron Vlaar, Feyenoord captain since 2010–11, visiting Villa Park – Aston Villa's home ground – in Birmingham. Shortly after, Martin van Geel confirmed Vlaar sought to leave Feyenoord. After the incident, Villa did not contact Vlaar, prompting Ronald Koeman to issue Villa a deadline of 23 July to negotiate Vlaar's transfer. On 23 July, Vlaar told the public that he would not leave Feyenoord, and said that he felt he was kept "dangling" by Villa. However, four days later, Vlaar told the public he would eventually be joining Villa, as he had agreed personal terms and would sign for Villa subject to him passing a medical. On 1 August, Vlaar officially joined Aston Villa, signing a three-year contract. Feyenoord supporters received the news generally mixed, with some congratulating and wishing the best of luck and others feeling betrayed by Vlaar for misleading them. Stefan de Vrij became the new Feyenoord captain, with Jordy Clasie, who because of his good play and tenacity soon became one of the most popular players among the supporters, becoming vice-captain.

On 7 August, Feyenoord was eliminated by Dynamo Kyiv in the third qualifying round of the Champions League following losses in both legs. Feyenoord was therefore demoted to the play-off round of the UEFA Europa League. Koeman said that Feyenoord was the better side over the two legs but had missed a scoring striker, referring to John Guidetti, who had rejoined Manchester City following the end of his loan. On 10 August 2012, Dutch international and Málaga defender Joris Mathijsen joined Feyenoord on a three-year contract. Málaga had made clear to Mathijsen that he needed to find a new club to generate income for the financially suffering Málaga after Sheikh Al Thani left. Stefan de Vrij remained captain, despite Mathijsen being more experienced at both international and club level.

After drawing the first leg of the Europa League qualifier at home 2–2 against Sparta Prague, Feyenoord was eliminated following a 2–0 loss in the second leg, meaning Feyenoord would not be playing European football in 2012–13. Following these events, Feyenoord loaned Parma and former AZ striker Graziano Pellè and exchanged Jerson Cabral for Twente striker Wesley Verhoek in a straight player swap. Feyenoord ended the season in third, behind champions Ajax and second-placed PSV. Pellè surprised many after scoring 27 goals in 29 matches, prompting Feyenoord to sign him permanently from Parma on a contract lasting until summer 2017.

In the 2013–14 season, Feyenoord recorded the worst start in its history, losing its first three matches to PEC Zwolle, Twente and Ajax respectively. Feyenoord would recover, but its performances were unstable throughout the season. However, because the Eredivisie's other top teams also played inconsistently, Feyenoord remained in the title race, although it eventually finished second, four points behind Ajax. In the UEFA Europa League, Feyenoord was eliminated in the third qualifying round by Kuban Krasnodar, making it Feyenoord's fifth consecutive season without European football.

On 1 February 2014, Ronald Koeman announced he would be resigning at the end of the season. On 3 March 2014, Fred Rutten was named the new manager for the 2014–15 season.

During the summer of the 2014–15 season, Feyenoord lost four of its best players: Daryl Janmaat to Newcastle United, Stefan de Vrij to Lazio, Bruno Martins Indi to Porto and Graziano Pellè to Southampton, with Southampton having just appointed Koeman as its new manager. To replace them, as well as other departed players, Feyenoord signed Warner Hahn from Dordrecht, Luke Wilkshire from Dynamo Moscow, Khalid Boulahrouz from Brøndby, Bilal Başaçıkoğlu from Heerenveen, Colin Kazim-Richards from Bursaspor, Jens Toornstra from Utrecht, Kenneth Vermeer from Ajax and Karim El Ahmadi from Aston Villa, returning to the club after two years in England.

With new players as well as a new head coach, Feyenoord began the 2014–15 Eredivisie season with just five points after four matches. However, the club was successful in reaching the Europa League group stage for the first time in six years. After losing to Besiktas 5–2 aggregate in the third qualifying round of the Champions League, they defeated Zorya Luhansk in the final qualifying round of the Europa League play-off, 5–4 aggregate.

Feyenoord won with 2–1 against Standard Liège in their first home match in Group G of the Europa League. It was the first victory for Feyenoord in the Europa League group stage in eight years. Feyenoord also beat Rijeka (2–0) and defending champions Sevilla (2–0), results sufficient for Feyenoord's progress to the knockout round for the first time in ten years. In the knockout round, Feyenoord lost to Roma 3–2 on aggregate. After this loss, Feyenoord did not recover. Despite nearly securing a spot in next season's Europa League qualification rounds, they failed to win any of their last five matches, ending the year in the fourth spot, behind AZ. In the play-offs to earn a spot for Europa League, they were eliminated by Heerenveen. After manager Fred Rutten opted not to extend his contract, on 23 March 2015 Feyenoord announced former Dutch international and Feyenoord player Giovanni van Bronckhorst would become its new manager. That summer the club contracted several new key players, Eric Botteghin from Groningen, Jan-Arie van der Heijden from Vitesse and Eljero Elia from Werder Bremen. It also welcomed back Dirk Kuyt from Fenerbahçe on a one-year contract.

Feyenoord started the season well and was in title contention until the winter break. However, Feyenoord hit a low point by losing seven matches a row. In the Eredivisie, the team came third, a large distance behind Ajax and the champions PSV. However, the season was not without success. After eight years without any trophies, Feyenoord won its 12th KNVB Cup on 24 April 2016. That next summer, Feyenoord managed to do some good business in the transfer market. The contracts of starting players like Dirk Kuyt and Eljero Elia were extended. Furthermore, it acquired Nicolai Jørgensen from Copenhagen for €3,500,000 and Brad Jones was contracted on a free transfer from NEC as a replacement for injured first-choice goalkeeper Kenneth Vermeer.

=== End of 18 year title drought ===
The 2016–17 season started positively, as the first nine league matches were won, and Feyenoord beat Manchester United 1–0 in the Europa League. This match, and all of Feyenoord's European home games were played in only a half-full stadium. These measures were taken to avoid new penalties from the UEFA. In that same week reigning Dutch champions PSV were beaten, 0–1. The first loss of points was against Ajax on 23 October 2016. The final score was 1–1 after goals of Kasper Dolberg and Dirk Kuyt. A week later another draw followed against Heerenveen. On 6 November, a weakened team lost for the first time that season; relegation candidate Go Ahead Eagles won 1–0. In the European campaign Feyenoord struggled, and after losses to Manchester United (4–0) and Fenerbahçe (0–1) the European adventure ended. In the Eredivisie the team booked big victories, such as a 6–1 defeat against Sparta and 0–4 against AZ. With a 5-point lead to second place Ajax, Feyenoord ended the year at the top of the league table.

In the second half of the season, Feyenoord started strongly, winning the first seven league games of 2017. However, in Arnhem, Vitesse proved to be too strong in the KNVB Cup (2–0). Feyenoord beat PSV at home (2–1), due to an own goal from PSV-goalkeeper Jeroen Zoet, which was indicated by Goal-line technology. On 5 March, Sparta was the first team to beat Feyenoord in the new year, by a goal in the first minute of the game, scored by Mathias Pogba. Feyenoord recovered quickly and another big win followed when they beat AZ, 5–2, and a week later Heerenveen were defeated 2–1. When Feyenoord lost to Ajax, and drew against PEC Zwolle, their lead was reduced to one point. After two more victories from Feyenoord and a loss for Ajax against PSV, the gap was four points with two games to go. One week before the end of the competition, Feyenoord could become champions away at Excelsior, just 4 kilometers from their home stadium, De Kuip, and also in Rotterdam. However, the team had a complete off-day and lost, 3–0. One week later, in the final game of the season, the team still became champions by beating Heracles by 3–1. All three goals were made by the team captain, Dirk Kuyt, who would later announce his retirement. The championship was Feyenoord's 15th and the first in 18 years. Feyenoord was the second team in the history of the Dutch league to stay at the top of the table the entire season. Because of the championship, Feyenoord was to compete for the Johan Cruyff Shield against cup winner Vitesse in the Kuip on 5 August 2017. After a 1–1 tie Feyenoord beat Vitesse by penalties.

As the Dutch champions, Feyenoord qualified directly for the 2017–18 UEFA Champions League group stage. The team was drawn with Manchester City, Shakhtar Donetsk and Napoli, and eventually lost its first five matches. However, their last home match – against Napoli – ended in victory, winning 2–1. That same season, Feyenoord was not able to win the Dutch championship again, but won the Dutch Cup after beating AZ 3–0 in the final. The 2018–19 season started with disappointment. Feyenoord qualified for the third qualifying round of the UEFA Europa League by virtue of winning the Dutch Cup. However, Feyenoord was immediately eliminated by Trenčín. During the 2018-19 Eredivisie season, Feyenoord was not able to maintain the pace of Ajax and PSV and finished in third place. However, Feyenoord beat both title contenders at home. It was the first loss of PSV after opening with a 13-game winning streak. Also, Feyenoord won against Ajax in historic fashion with 6–2. Ajax got revenge by beating Feyenoord in De Kuip in the semi-final of the Dutch Cup. After the season, head coach Giovanni van Bronckhorst left the club, while star player Robin van Persie retired. Jaap Stam was appointed as the new head coach.

=== New struggles ===
The 2019–20 season started with mixed results. Feyenoord reached the group stage of the Europa League by comfortably beating Dinamo Tbilisi and Hapoel Be'er Sheva. However, in the eredivisie Feyenoord won only three of the first ten matches and found themselves in tenth place before heading to Amsterdam for an away game against title holders and league leaders Ajax. After the first half, Ajax lead the game 4–0, which was also the final result. Jaap Stam resigned after the game, after which Dick Advocaat replaced him as head coach. With Advocaat as the new head coach, Feyenoord improved, staying undefeated and climbed the table from the 12th to third place, only six points behind league leaders Ajax and AZ. Furthermore, Feyenoord qualified for the final of the Dutch Cup. However, the Eredivisie was suspended and eventually abandoned due to the COVID-19 pandemic. The ranking when the league was suspended became the final ranking, meaning Feyenoord ended the season in third place, qualifying for the group stage of the 2020–21 Europa League. The cup final was not played.

Feyenoord had a decent start of the 2020–21 Eredivisie season, losing only once after 16 matches. However, Feyenoord was eliminated during the group stage of the Europa League. In the league, Feyenoord found themselves on second place, three points behind league leaders Ajax before playing them in a direct confrontation for the top spot. Ajax won the match 1–0. Feyenoord had a disappointing second half of the season, winning only six matches. In the meanwhile, Feyenoord lost 4–3 against Heerenveen in the quarter finals of the KNVB cup, despite a 1–3 lead in the second half. Feyenoord finished in fifth place, and had to participate in the play-off tournament to secure a spot in the UEFA Europa Conference League. Feyenoord succeeded, by first beating Sparta and then Utrecht, both with 2–0 victories. During the season, it was announced that AZ coach Arne Slot would succeed Dick Advocaat as the head coach of Feyenoord.

=== Arne Slot era: back in title contention and European final ===
For the 2021–22 season, Feyenoord participated in the inaugural edition of the UEFA Europa Conference League. Feyenoord narrowly defeated Drita 3–2 in the second qualifying round. But Feyenoord improved, beating Luzern 3-0 twice in the third qualifying round and Elfsborg 6–3 on aggregate. Feyenoord topped a group with Maccabi Haifa, Union Berlin and Slavia Prague and qualified for the round of 16. Feyenoord defeated Partizan Belgrado 5–2 away and 3–1 at home. In the quarter-finals, Feyenoord again played Slavia Prague. After a 3–3 draw at home, Feyenoord managed to win 1–3 in Prague. In the semi-finals, Feyenoord faced Marseille. The first game in the Kuip was won 3–2. In the away leg, Feyenoord held on to a 0–0 draw. The team managed to reach the final, but lost 1–0 to Italian club Roma. In the Eredivisie, Feyenoord improved on the total of the previous season, finishing in third place with 71 points. In the Dutch Cup, Feyenoord were eliminated in the second round after extra time by Twente.

After the success in the Conference League, Feyenoord lost many players, including nine players who played in the Conference League final. With a new squad, Feyenoord managed to stay in title contention in the 2022–23 Eredivisie season. Only one match was lost in the first half of the season, 4–3 against PSV. During the World Cup break, Feyenoord topped the table, three points clear of runners up PSV and Ajax. After the world cup break, the form improved. While a few games against other title contenders were drawn, Feyenoord was able to keep hold of the first spot. Feyenoord started a 13-game winning streak, among others booking crucial, late victories against AZ at home and away against Ajax. The win against Ajax was the first win of Feyenoord in an away match against Ajax since 2005. Feyenoord secured the title two games before the end of the season by winning 3–0 against Go Ahead Eagles. It was the 16th championship win in the history of the club and the first since 2017. Feyenoord was lauded by many experts as the deserved champion, due to their energetic and attacking playing style.

In the Europa League, Feyenoord was drawn in a group with Midtjylland, Sturm Graz and Lazio. All teams ended with eight points, but Feyenoord finished the group stage in first place by virtue of a superior goal difference. In the round of 16, Feyenoord defeated Shakhtar Donetsk 8–2 on aggregate and was drawn to play against Roma again in the quarter-finals. The first match at home ended with a 1–0 victory. The return match went to extra time and resulted in a 4–1 victory for Roma. In the Dutch Cup, Feyenoord were defeated in the semi-finals at home by Ajax, 1–2. Due to the successes and playing style of Feyenoord, there was some serious interest from clubs in Arne Slot, including from Tottenham Hotspur. However, after a few weeks of rumours, Arne Slot extended his contract, citing that he was not finished yet at Feyenoord.

Feyenoord started the 2023–24 Eredivisie season slowly. The Johan Cruijff Schaal was lost against PSV 0–1, while the first two league games were drawn. Feyenoord then booked seven consecutive victories, including a 0–4 away win against Ajax in Amsterdam. This streak was ended by a loss in Enschede against Twente. Feyenoord also lost again at home against PSV 1–2. Despite these setbacks, Feyenoord had more points after 16 matches compared to the previous season. However, as PSV started the season perfectly, winning all their 16 matches, Feyenoord found themselves in second place, 10 points behind their rivals at the winter break. In the 2023–24 UEFA Champions League, Feyenoord was drawn in group with Atletico Madrid, Celtic and Lazio once again. Feyenoord won the home games against Celtic and Lazio. Despite showing good form and impressing foreign media with their play, Feyenoord failed to pick up a single point in the away matches, as well as at home against Atletico. Feyenoord ended the group stage on third place and qualified for the preliminary round of the 2023–24 UEFA Europa League. Feyenoord was drawn against Roma again. Both matches ended in a 1–1 draw, after which Feyenoord was defeated in a penalty shootout. It was the third year in a row that Feyenoord's European season was ended by Roma.

After the winter break, Feyenoord won at 1–0 home against PSV in the third round of the KNVB-cup. It was the first defeat of PSV against a Dutch opponent in almost a year. Feyenoord played AZ at home in the quarter finals and won 2–0. In the semi-finals, Feyenoord played at home again, this time against Keuken Kampioen Divisie team Groningen. Feyenoord won the match 2-1 and advanced to the finals against NEC. In the league, Feyenoord stayed in second place, among others drawing against PSV, 2-2. It was the only time PSV didn't win a home game in the Eredivisie. On April 7, Feyenoord defeated Ajax at home 6–0. It was the biggest defeat of Ajax in a competitive game since the inception of the Eredivisie and the first time Ajax failed to score in both league games against Feyenoord. In the KNVB Cup final against NEC, Feyenoord won 1–0. It was the 14th cup victory of Feyenoord and the first since 2018. Feyenoord clinched second place and qualification for the group stage of the 2024–25 UEFA Champions League four games before the end of the season by winning 1–3 at Go Ahead Eagles. After this game, Liverpool and Feyenoord reached an agreement that Arne Slot would transfer to Liverpool, succeeding Jurgen Klopp as head coach. Feyenoord outscored PSV in the second half of the season with five points; however, it was not enough the erase the deficit. Feyenoord remained unbeaten in all competitive matches after the winter break and ended the season with 84 points, one point shy of their highest total in 1973. Coincidentally, in both seasons Feyenoord finished in second place.

=== Mixed results with new coaches ===
Brian Priske, coach of Sparta Prague and born in Denmark, was appointed as the successor of Arne Slot. He became the first foreign head coach at Feyenoord since 1991, when Gunder Bengtsson from Sweden was head coach. Priske started his tenure by winning the Johan Cruijff Schaal against champions PSV. After a spectacular game that ended in a 4–4 draw, Feyenoord won after a penalty shoot-out. With a new coach and new players, Feyenoord only won two of the first six league games, drawing the others. Then, Feyenoord won six out of the next seven games, only losing against Ajax. In the Champions League, Feyenoord mixed disappointing home losses against Bayer Leverkusen and Red Bull Salzburg, with positive results in away matches. Feyenoord won 2–3 against Girona and 1–3 against Benfica, and drew 3–3 after being 3–0 down against Manchester City. In the Eredivisie, by the winter break, Feyenoord was in fourth place, ten points behind league leaders PSV. Feyenoord continued to show poor form after the winter break, losing at home against Utrecht and drawing away against Willem II. Before the home game against Bayern Munich in the Champions League, persistent rumors appeared that Priske would be dismissed after the game, even with a win. However, after Feyenoord won the game 3–0, Feyenoord maintained Priske.

Following another series of disappointing results, Priske was eventually dismissed. The lack of chemistry between (part of) the coaching staff and the players, the disappointing results in the league, the lack of development in play and the poor physical condition of the players – which resulted in many injuries – were all reasons for this decision. Youth Academy coach Pascal Bosschaart would temporarily take over as head coach. With Pascal Bosschaart, Feyenoord was able to eliminate AC Milan in the preliminary rounds of the Champions League, by winning 1–0 at home and drawing 1–1 in Milan. This set-up a leg in the round of 16 with Internazionale. Feyenoord announced that Robin van Persie, former player and current head coach of Heerenveen would take over as the permanent head coach. With Van Persie as the new head coach, Feyenoord was eliminated in the Champions League bij Internazionale. In the Eredivisie, Feyenoord recovered and clinched third place and the qualifying rounds of the 2025–26 UEFA Champions League one match before the end of the season by beating RKC at home.

With Robin van Persie as the new coach, Feyenoord started the 2025–26 with mixed results. Feyenoord was eliminated by Fenerbahce in the qualifying rounds of the Champions League, relegating Feyenoord to the Europa League. In the Eredivisie, Feyenoord won eight out of the first nine matches and drawing the other one, which earned them first place. However, after losing 2–3 against fellow contenders PSV at home, a streak of poor results saw Feyenoord quickly fell out of the title race. The gap to league leaders PSV grew as big as 19 points in the league. Feyenoord was able to maintain second place and secured direct qualification for the Champions League one week before the end of the season. However, statistically, this one of the worst seasons ever for a runner-up in the Eredivisie. Feyenoord was knocked out of the KNVB Cup by SC Heerenveen. And Feyenoord finished in 29th place in the Europa League, which resulted in their elimination as well.

== Location ==
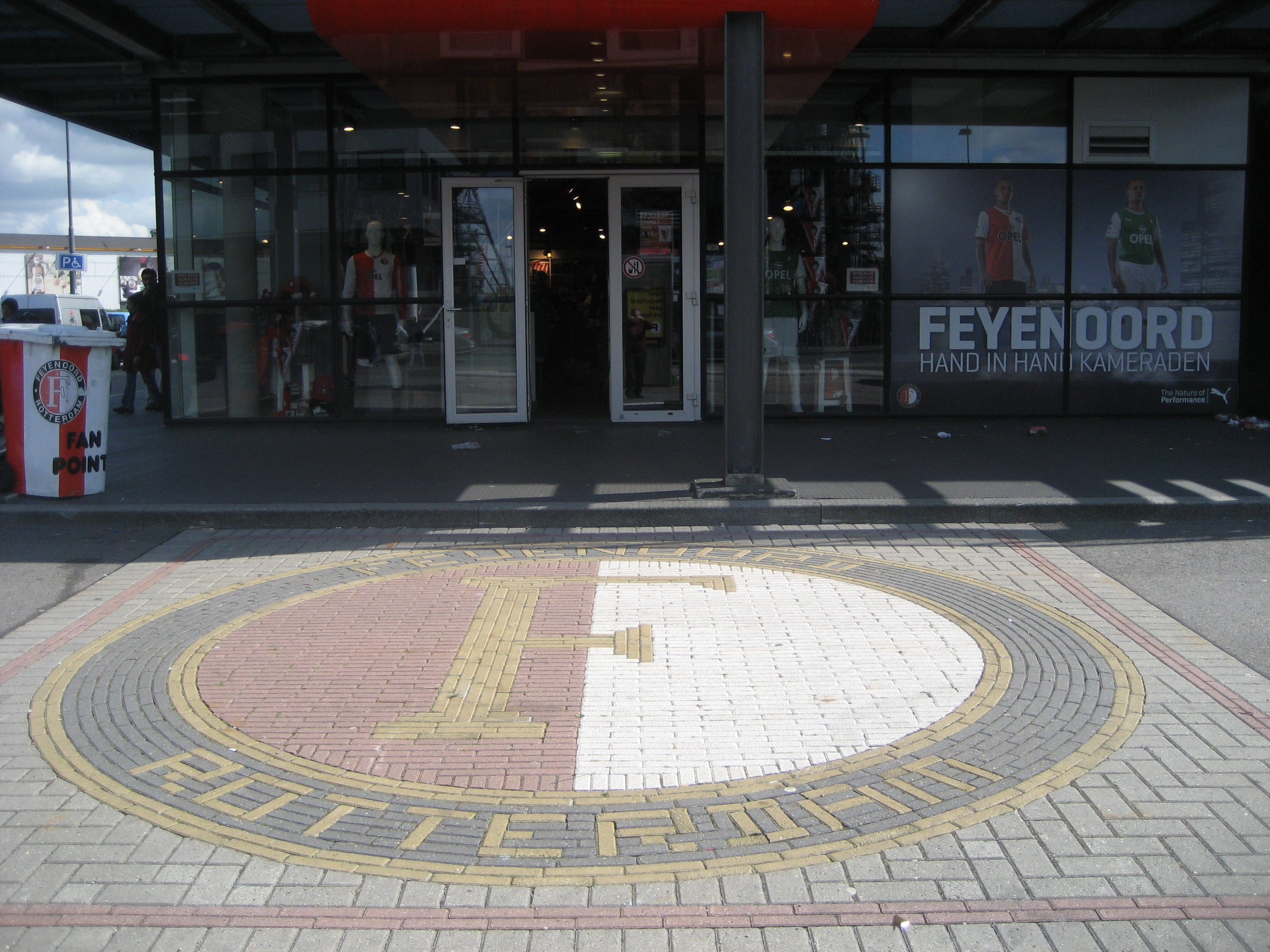
Logo near De Kuip

Feyenoord are located in the Feijenoord district of southern Rotterdam and is named after the district in which the club was founded. More frequent appearances in international tournaments led the club to change its name in 1974, because foreign fans unfamiliar with the Dutch language did not know how to pronounce ij. Besides Feyenoord, there are two other professional football clubs in Rotterdam: Sparta and Excelsior. Feyenoord and Sparta (promoted after the 2018–19 season) and Excelsior (promoted after the 2024–25 season) are all playing in the 2025–26 Eredivisie season.

== Stadium ==
=== De Kuip ===
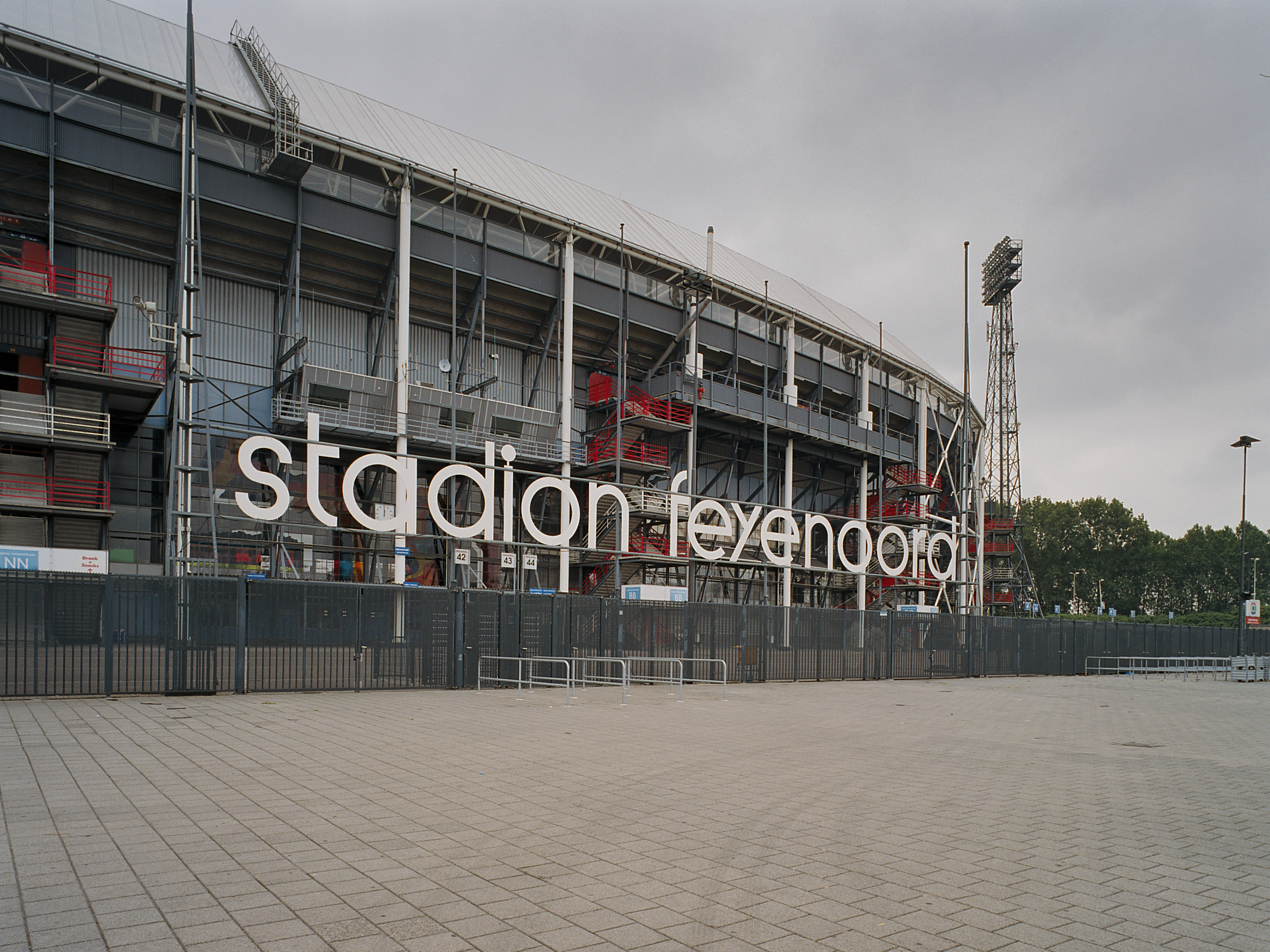
Outside the stadium

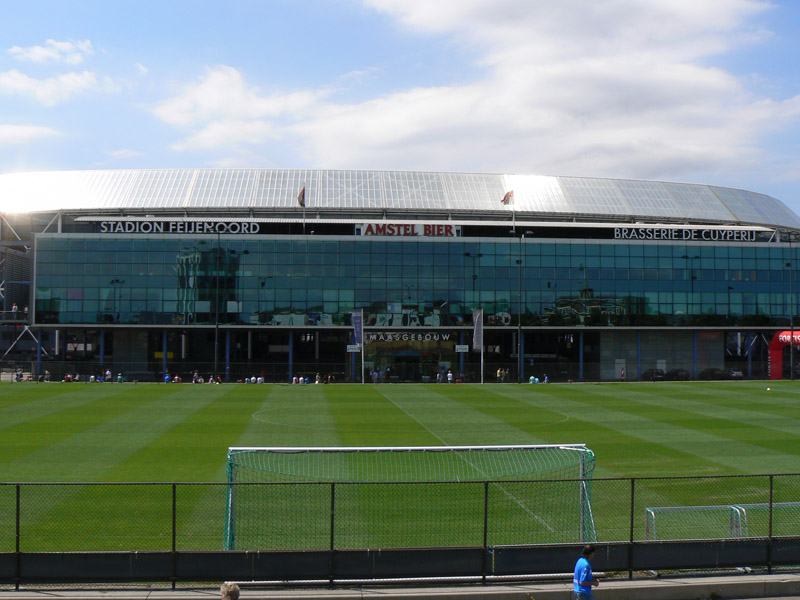
De Kuip in 2006

The club's Feijenoord Stadion, located in the IJsselmonde district of Rotterdam, is nicknamed De Kuip, Dutch for The Tub. It was built in 1937 and is a major European stadium. It has 51,117 seats and has hosted a record of ten finals of UEFA club competitions, including the 2002 UEFA Cup Final fittingly won by Feyenoord. Former Feyenoord player Mike Obiku once said, "Every time you enter the pitch, you're stepping into a lion's den." Feyenoord did not own the stadium until 2026, when the club purchased and absorbed the organisation that owned the stadium.

In 1935, Feijenoord player Puck van Heel hit the first pole on their way into their new stadium. The stadium was opened on 27 March 1937 and Beerschot was beaten by 5–2, Leen Vente scored the first goal in De Kuip. Already in the very beginning the stadium was sold out on several occasions and other events held at de Kuip also gained high attendance. During World War II, the stadium was one of the few locations which was not bombed, however the Nazis occupied the stadium. After the war, De Kuip became a popular location once again. In 1949, the attendance record was broken during the match to decide the Dutch championship between SVV Schiedam and Heerenveen; 64,368 fans attended the match.

Besides football, there were also boxing and motorcycle speedway races in De Kuip, which were also gaining popularity. In 1953, people had to hide inside the stadium during the North Sea flood of 1953. On 27 November 1957, Feyenoord played versus Bolton Wanderers during an evening match. It was the first time the floodlights were used. The players entered the pitch in the dark and the fans were asked to light their matchsticks when the floodlights were activated. Since that evening, that match at De Kuip has always been special among Feyenoord fans.

In 1963, De Kuip hosted their first European final (Cup winners' Cup) between Tottenham Hotspur and Atlético Madrid. Nine more European finals would follow in the years after with Feyenoord's win over Borussia Dortmund in the 2002 UEFA Cup final being the tenth and latest. The attendance record of 1949 was broken in 1968 when 65,427 fans attended the Feyenoord–Twente match.

=== New stadium ===
In December 2006, Feyenoord director Chris Woerts announced that Feyenoord were developing plans to build a new stadium which would have a capacity of roughly 90,000 seats. The stadium would most likely be placed on the Nieuwe Maas, the river that runs through Rotterdam, and should be completed by 2016. In May 2008, Woerts announced further details: the club is aiming for a stadium with a capacity of around 100,000 seats. If possible, a capacity of over 130,000 should be realized according to Woerts, which would earn the title of biggest stadium in Europe. The club emphasized its efforts to make it a true football stadium with seats close to the pitch. The stadium will get a retractable roof so that other events can be held as well. According to plans in those days, the stadium should be ready in 2016. Due to financial difficulties for all parties involved and the fact that the Netherlands were not chosen to host the 2018 FIFA World Cup, the plans for a new stadium have been put on hold. A new stadium will most likely be built in the future, though it will likely not have a spectator capacity greater than 70,000.

In September 2012, Feyenoord confirmed that they would try to build a new stadium by 2018. The stadium was designed by VolkerWessels, it would have cost around €300 million (~£242 million). Another option was a plan made by a consortium of BAM, Eneco Energie and Siemens. But the plan was rejected by the Feyenoord and Stadion Feijenoord direction. The new stadium should be a 63,000 all-seater. Due to the illustrious history of De Kuip, many fans were against the demolition of De Kuip and instead preferred a renovation of the current stadium. One of those initiatives was Red de Kuip, which is Dutch for Save de Kuip. They made plans of building a third tier on top of the current stadium, increasing the capacity to 68,000. This plan would cost only €117 million (~£94 million).

In 2016, Feyenoord announced their plans for a new stadium called Feyenoord City. The planned capacity was set to be around 65,000 seats, which would've made it the Netherlands' largest stadium. Despite the council approving the plans for the new stadium, it once again proved unpopular with many Feyenoord supporters. In May 2022, the director of Stadion Feyenoord, Jan van Merwijk announced that Feyenoord City would not be feasible due to financial difficulties, and that a major renovation of Stadion Feyenoord would also be out of question for the time being.

=== Stadium songs ===
==== Official Feyenoord hymn ====
Feyenoord's official hymn since 1961 is called "Hand in Hand". Its melody was written in the 19th century by German Wilhelm Speidel. In 1961, Jaap Valkhoff wrote the lyrics which became popular among Feyenoord supporters who adopted the song as their unofficial hymn. Valkhoff wrote lyrics on the same melody for several other teams as well. Among them were Feyenoord's archrivals Ajax. Nowadays, the song is heard wherever Feyenoord play their matches, but also fans of MVV and Club Brugge have their own version that they sing.

==== Other songs ====
When a goal is scored by Feyenoord in their home matches the song "I Will Survive", covered by the Hermes House Band (but made famous by Gloria Gaynor in the 1970s) is played.

Feyenoord supporters are known to be creative and have a lot of various songs and chants in their equipment during matches. Among the most important Feyenoord songs are Wie heeft er weer een goal gescoord, Feijenoord, Feijenoord by Tom Manders, "Mijn Feyenoord" by Lee Towers, "Feyenoord, wat gaan we doen vandaag?" by Cock van der Palm, and "De laatste trein naar Rotterdam" by Tom Manders. During the 2001/02 season, when Feyenoord won the UEFA Cup, a parody of the song "Put your hands up" by Black and White Brothers was launched, called "Put your hands up for Pi-Air", a tribute to Pierre ("Pi-Air") van Hooijdonk, one of the club's key players at the time. In the 1970s, Coen Moulijn also had a song dedicated to him, "Coentje Coentje Coentje".

== Supporters ==
Feyenoord's fan base is described as one of the most loyal fan bases in the sport. They are nicknamed Het Legioen, Dutch for The Legion and can be found everywhere in the Netherlands and far across the Dutch borders. Squad number 12 is never given to a player, but is reserved for Het Legioen instead.

=== Popularity ===
Feyenoord is a popular club in the Netherlands with a large number of supporters. The team's first training session of a season alone attracts thousands of fans; 20,000 attended 2007–08's inaugural session.

In 1963, about 3,000 fans boarded on two ships, among thousands of others by train or car and they travelled to Lisbon where Feyenoord faced Benfica in the European Cup. When Feyenoord play abroad in European competitions, about 8,000 travel together to support their team. Almost 15,000 fans were cheering for their team in 1996 when Feyenoord played in Germany against Borussia Mönchengladbach. About 40,000 fans visit a regular match at home, while top matches against Ajax, PSV and European cup opponents are sold out most of the time. About 250,000 fans showed up when Feyenoord's Dutch championship was celebrated in 1999 at the Coolsingel in the centre of the city. After Feyenoord beat Internazionale in the 2002 UEFA Cup semi-final, Inter midfielder Clarence Seedorf said: "I really enjoyed the atmosphere in the Kuip. As an ex-Ajax player, I was really given the bird, but that's all part of the emotions in football. It also illustrates the intense way in which the Feyenoord supporters experience their club's matches".

A number of the club's followers acknowledge a very close link with English side Sunderland. Over 100 Feyenoord supporters attended a function in Sunderland on the evening before their fixture with Newcastle in April 2015, and a similar number of Sunderland fans made the journey to watch the Dutch side in their ultimately delayed fixture against Vitesse.

Beyond the Netherlands, Feyenoord opened a fanshop in the centre of Tokyo, when Japanese player Shinji Ono was a key player at the club, and also in South Korea when Song Chong-Gug played for Feyenoord.

=== Supporters organisations ===
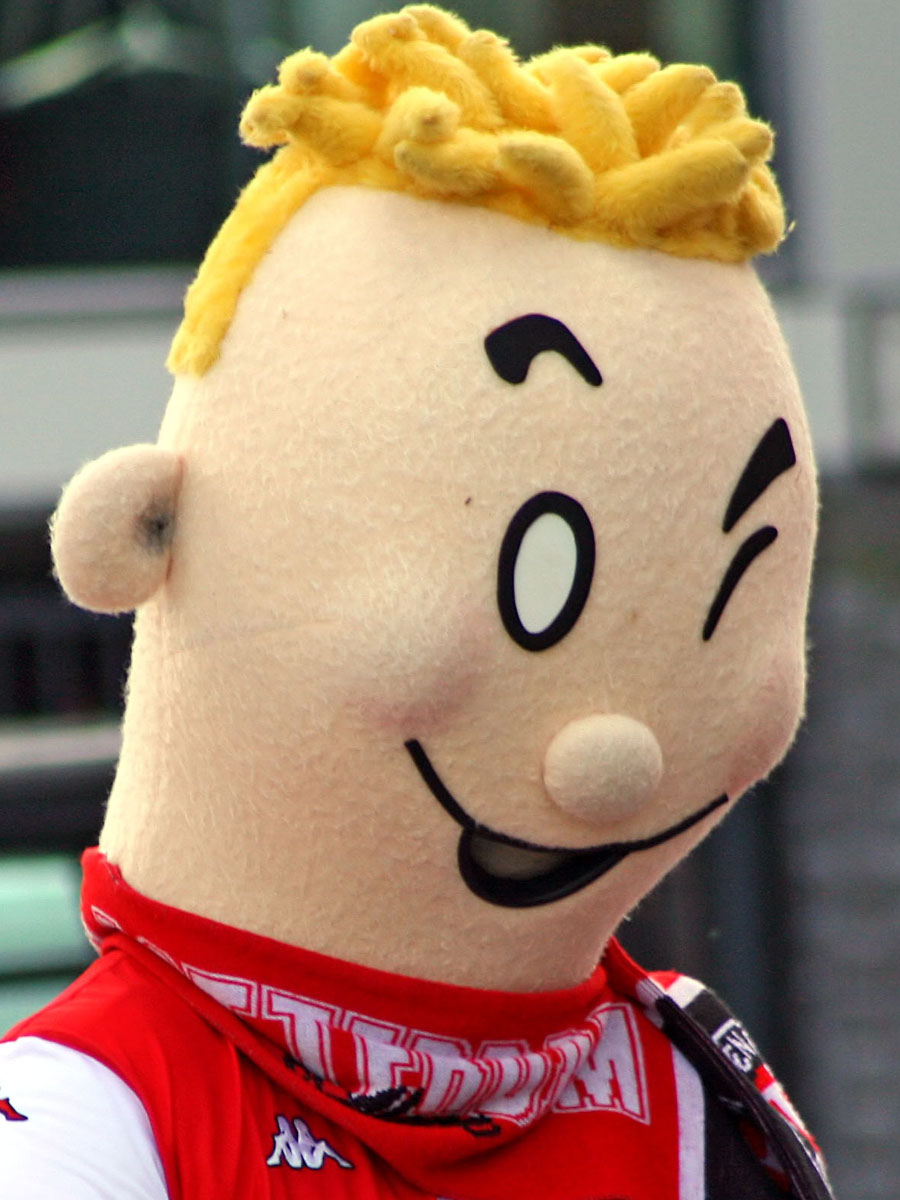
Coentje, the mascot of the Kameraadjes

Feyenoord have one official fan supporters club, the Feyenoord Supportersvereniging. Independent of the club, FSV has a membership of about 23,000, as of 2006. The FSV act as a liaison between club and fans, produce match programmes, arrange travel to away games and organise supporters' evenings, as well as being involved in the other supporters organisations. Children between 0 and 12 years old can join the Kameraadjes group (English: little comrades).

In 1998, the Feyenoord Supporters Vereniging were wondering about whether or not it would be possible to create more atmosphere inside the stadium mainly during important matches. As a result, a few huge flags were produced and brought into the stadium prior to matches played by Feyenoord. The flags were a success, but people started asking for more activities and a meeting between fans and officials were arranged. In 2000, Harry Veth was given permission to establish a group of five Feyenoord fans called TIFO team Feyenoord Rotterdam. Besides creating more flags and small pieces of paper released from the second platform, the team also started to organise bigger activities. The first big activity was held on 10 December 2000 when Feyenoord faced Ajax and 40 fog machines were activated when the players entered the pitch. In the following years, many different and various activities were held to improve the atmosphere inside the stadium. Feyenoord's TIFO team became famous abroad as well and the Italian TIFO foundation awarded Feyenoord the Best of TIFO Award 2000/01.

=== Jeugdproject ===
Feyenoord's Jeugdproject (Youth Project) concentrate on children between 6 and 12 years of age, playing football at schools and amateur teams. To show the kids the importance of sports and sportsmanship, Feyenoord invite the children to De Kuip to see what sport can do to people: happiness, disappointment, excitement, emotions, fear and cosines, it brings people together. In Feyenoord's Youth Project, visiting a match is the central point, but there is also an educative and cultural character included. Feyenoord provide schools and amateur clubs with small teaching books and expect these to be filled in by the visiting youth when they enter the stadium on a match day. The groups that support Feyenoord in the most original way and those who can predict the score correctly are awarded with prizes.

=== Opening day ===
A few weeks after the start of the pre-season, yet prior to the start of the competitive season, the club opens its doors for free for all Feyenoord fans and to present the squad for the upcoming season. De Kuip already opens in the morning when there are many activities around the stadium mainly for children and promotional activities for companies which have a partnership with Feyenoord. Fans can also take a stadium tour and walk on the pitch. The activities inside the stadium itself normally start around noon, when there are several performances by various artists. Every year, the new Feyenoord ambassador of the year is announced at opening day. A minute of silence is held for all former Feyenoord players who have died and for known fans who have died in the previous year.

Former Feyenoord players return to De Kuip every year to play versus a team of Dutch celebrities. The stadium activities end after the squad for the upcoming season is presented to the fans. This is a special event, mainly for the new signings of the team. They arrive into the ground via helicopter, with a full stadium of fans in attendance. Once they are there, the other players and club officials enter the pitch one by one. All players are available for autograph sessions afterwards. Feyenoord's open day attracts approximately 60,000 to 70,000 fans to Rotterdam, coming from all over the Netherlands, while there are only 51,117 seats available within the stadium. The opening day is known as a unique event in the Netherlands.

=== Notable supporters ===
Notable supporters of Feyenoord include Craig Bellamy, Wouter Bos, Gerard Cox, Robert Eenhoorn, DJ Paul Elstak, Arjan Erkel, Dennis van der Geest, Ernesto Hoost, Jan Marijnissen, Joost Klein, and Raemon Sluiter.

Raemon Sluiter, Lee Towers, Dennis van der Geest, Robert Eenhoorn and Renate Verbaan have all officially been Feyenoord ambassadors. Gerard Meijer is the current ambassador, also being appointed "ambassador for life" on 19 July 2008.

== Rivalries ==
=== De Klassieker ===
Ajax from Amsterdam are Feyenoord's archrivals. The two clubs share a long history together and matches between the two clubs are called De Klassieker (lit. 'The Classic'). The rivalry is not only between the two teams, but also a confrontation between the two largest cities of the country, Amsterdam and Rotterdam, two cities with extreme differences in attitude and culture. The meeting between the two teams is still considered to be the biggest match of the season. In the past, there have been many clashes between the supporters of both clubs, of which the Beverwijk clash in 1997 is the most infamous, with Ajax fan Carlo Picornie being killed and several others injured.

In 2004, Feyenoord player Jorge Acuña was taken to hospital with head, neck and rib injuries after Feyenoord players were attacked by Ajax hooligans during a match between the reserve teams of both clubs. Another Feyenoord player, Robin van Persie, had to be rescued by Ajax coach John van 't Schip and player Daniël de Ridder. In 2005, riots before and after the match occurred in Rotterdam and were considered to belong to the worst in the history of Dutch football.

=== Rotterdam derby ===
Rotterdam is the city with the most professional teams in the Netherlands. Besides Feyenoord there are Sparta Rotterdam and Excelsior. There is a rivalry between the teams, mostly between Feyenoord and Sparta as Excelsior used to be Feyenoord's feeder club, but it is not comparable to other local derbies. The rivalry between Sparta and Feyenoord is mostly seen on the Sparta side. The rivalry started in the 1910s and 20s, when Sparta was regarded as a club for the elite, while Feyenoord was regarded the club for the people, mostly workers. Some Sparta fans have refused to enter Feyenoord's De Kuip stadium, even when Sparta had reached the KNVB Cup final, which was played in De Kuip. In the 1950s, there was much more of a rivalry. One of the key factors for these feelings was footballer Tinus Bosselaar, who moved from Sparta to Feyenoord in 1954 before Sparta re-signed him, despite Feyenoord trying to prevent the deal in court.

Feyenoord also have a rivalry abroad against Tottenham Hotspur following several violent clashes between the club's supporters and Tottenham's "link" to Ajax.

== Honours ==
Type	Competition	Titles	Seasons
Domestic	Eredivisie	16	1923–24, 1927–28, 1935–36, 1937–38, 1939–40, 1960–61, 1961–62, 1964–65, 1968–69, 1970–71, 1973–74, 1983–84, 1992–93, 1998–99, 2016–17, 2022–23
Domestic	KNVB Cup	14	1929–30, 1934–35, 1964–65, 1968–69, 1979–80, 1983–84, 1990–91, 1991–92, 1993–94, 1994–95, 2007–08, 2015–16, 2017–18, 2023–24
Domestic	Johan Cruyff Shield	5	1991, 1999, 2017, 2018, 2024
Continental	European Cup	1	1969–70
Continental	UEFA Cup	2	1973–74, 2001–02
Worldwide	Intercontinental Cup	1	1970

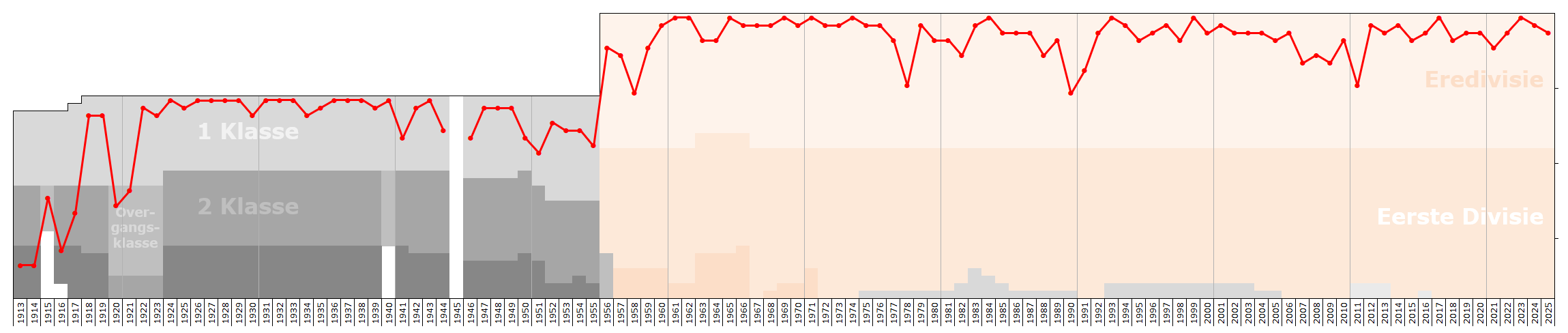
Historical chart of league performance

== European record ==
As of 3 November 2026

Competition	Pld	W	D	L	GF	GA	GD	Win%
European Cup/UEFA Champions League	113	43	25	45	185	169	+16	38.05
UEFA Cup/UEFA Europa League	159	63	38	58	243	205	+38	39.62
UEFA Europa Conference League	19	12	5	2	43	21	+22	63.16
European Cup Winners' Cup/UEFA Cup Winners' Cup	36	18	10	8	57	34	+23	50.00
UEFA Super Cup	1	0	0	1	1	3	−2	0.00
Inter-Cities Fairs Cup	2	1	0	1	2	4	−2	50.00
Total	330	137	78	115	531	436	+95	41.52

== UEFA club coefficient ranking ==
UEFA club coefficient: 71,000 (27th) (as per 19 March 2026)

Rank	Nation	Team	Points
24	England	Aston Villa	73,000
25	Italy	Juventus	72,250
26	Netherlands	PSV Eindhoven	71,250
27	Netherlands	Feyenoord	71,000
28	England	West Ham United	69,000
29	France	Lille	68,750
30	Italy	AC Milan	66,000

== Feyenoord coaches ==
Feyenoord have had coaches from all over Europe. In the early years, the club mainly had English managers, as football was already professional there. Feyenoord's first Dutch coach was Engel Geneugelijk (ad interim), while Richard Dombi is seen as the first successful coach. He led the team in three different periods. During the club's weakest period, Feyenoord was coached by two coaches at once, the Dutchman Pim Verbeek and the Swede Gunder Bengtsson. Bengtsson was the last foreign coach to lead Feyenoord. Feyenoord's international trophies were won by Ernst Happel, Wiel Coerver and Bert van Marwijk.

Season(s)	Name
1921–22	(England) Bill Julian
1924–25	(England) Harry Waites
1925–26	(Netherlands) Engel Geneugelijk (a.i.)
1926–29	(England) Jack Hall
1930 (Note: Lamb left after a couple of weeks, due to "homesickness".)	(England) Joseph Lamb
1930–31	(Netherlands) Jaap Kruys (a.i.)
1931–35	(England) Eddy Donaghy
1935–39	(Austria) Richard Dombi
1939–40	(England) Jack Hall
1940	(Netherlands) Karel Kaufman (a.i.)
1940–41	(Netherlands) Theo Huizenaar
1941–42	(Netherlands) Kees van Dijke
1942–46	(Netherlands) Kees Pijl
1946–50	(Netherlands) Adriaan Koonings
1950–51	(England) Harry Topping
1951–56	(Austria) Richard Dombi
1956	(Netherlands) Piet de Wolf (a.i.)
1956–58	(Netherlands) Jaap van der Leck
1958–59	(Netherlands) Piet de Wolf (a.i.)
1959–61	(Czechoslovakia) Jiří Sobotka
1961–63	(Austria) Franz Fuchs
1963–64	(Romania) Norberto Höfling
1964–67	(Austria) Willy Kment
1967–69	(Netherlands) Ben Peeters
1969–73	(Austria) Ernst Happel
1973	(Netherlands) Ad Zonderland (a.i.)
1973–75	(Netherlands) Wiel Coerver
1975–76	(Poland) Antoni Brzezanczyk
1976	(Netherlands) Ad Zonderland (a.i.)
1976–78	(Socialist Federal Republic of Yugoslavia) Vujadin Boškov
1978–82	(Czech Republic) Václav Ježek
1982	(Netherlands) Clemens Westerhof (a.i.)
1982–83	(Netherlands) Hans Kraay
1983	(Netherlands) Ab Fafié (a.i.)

Season(s)	Manager
1983–84	(Netherlands) Thijs Libregts
1984–86	(Netherlands) Ab Fafié
1986–88	(Netherlands) Rinus Israël
1988–89	(Netherlands) Rob Jacobs
1989	(Netherlands) Pim Verbeek
1989–91	(Sweden) Gunder Bengtsson
1991	(Netherlands) Wim Jansen (a.i.)
1991–92	(Netherlands) Hans Dorjee
1992	(Netherlands) Wim Jansen (a.i.)
1992–95	(Netherlands) Willem van Hanegem
1995	(Netherlands) Geert Meijer (a.i.)
1995–97	(Netherlands) Arie Haan
1997	(Netherlands) Geert Meijer (a.i.)
1997	(Netherlands) John Metgod (a.i.)
1997-00	(Netherlands) Leo Beenhakker
2000	(Netherlands) Henk van Stee (a.i.)
2000–04	(Netherlands) Bert van Marwijk
2004–05	(Netherlands) Ruud Gullit
2005–07	(Netherlands) Erwin Koeman
2007	(Netherlands) Leo Beenhakker (a.i.)
2007–08	(Netherlands) Bert van Marwijk
2008–09	(Netherlands) Gertjan Verbeek
2009	(Netherlands) Leon Vlemmings (a.i.)
2009–11	(Netherlands) Mario Been
2011	(Netherlands) Leon Vlemmings (a.i.)
2011–14	(Netherlands) Ronald Koeman
2014–15	(Netherlands) Fred Rutten
2015–19	(Netherlands) Giovanni van Bronckhorst
2019	(Netherlands) Jaap Stam
2019–21	(Netherlands) Dick Advocaat
2021–24	(Netherlands) Arne Slot
2024–25	(Denmark) Brian Priske
2025	(Netherlands) Pascal Bosschaart (a.i.)
2025–26	(Netherlands) Robin van Persie
2026–	(Netherlands) Giovanni van Bronckhorst

== Feyenoord chairmen ==
Although Feyenoord's coaches have come from all over Europe, the club's chairmen have been mostly Dutch, with Amandus Lundqvist from Sweden as the only exception. With 28 years, Cor Kieboom was the longest-reigning chairman in club history.

Season(s)	Chairmen
1908–11	(Netherlands) Gerardus Dirk van Leerdam
1911–18	(Netherlands) Leen van Zandvliet
1918–19	(Netherlands) Jan van Bennekom
1920–25	(Netherlands) Johan Weber
1925–39	(Netherlands) Leen van Zandvliet
1939–67	(Netherlands) Cor Kieboom
1967–73	(Netherlands) Guus Couwenberg
1973–79	(Netherlands) Leo van Zandvliet
1979–82	(Netherlands) Guus Couwenberg

Season(s)	Chairmen
1982–89	(Netherlands) Gerard Kerkum
1989–90	(Netherlands) Carlo de Swart
1990–92	(Sweden) Amandus Lundqvist
1992–06	(Netherlands) Jorien van den Herik
2006–07	(Netherlands) Gerard Kerkum
2007–15	(Netherlands) Dick van Well
2015–19	(Netherlands) Gerard Hoetmer
2019–	(Netherlands) Toon van Bodegom

== Media ==
Since 2000 Feyenoord has had its own television programme, shown weekly on SBS6. The show features interviews with players and other team members as well as documentaries about the team. As of the 2006–07 season Feyenoord launched its own Feyenoord TV project on their website with daily news and reports that tells everything about the club. In 1993, Feyenoord introduced their own newspaper, the Feyenoord Krant, the only Dutch club to do so. The newspaper is published fortnightly, with a print run of 25,000. Extra editions are published to coincide with European matches. Inside the newspaper, news, background information, interviews, reports and columns by Feyenoord related figures can be found.

Feyenoord were one of the latest Dutch teams to open their own official website on 21 May 2001. The site is available in Dutch and English, plus other languages depending upon the nationalities of the club's high-profile players. As of 2007, Japanese and Korean editions are available due to the popularity of Shinji Ono and Song Chong-Gug in their home countries. Since 2004, Feyenoord have shared a website 2 teams 1 goal with UNICEF as part of Feyenoord's children's welfare project in Ghana. To mark Feyenoord's centenary another site was launched in January 2007 to publicise events related to the occasion. Feyenoord also opened official Live.com and YouTube pages in 2006. Feyenoord also offer the option to follow the club with news and statistics on cell phones or email. For each and every home match a daily program magazine is created and children who are members of the Kameraadjes also receive a magazine. At the beginning of the season Feyenoord produce a new presentation magazine, while at the end of the season a Feyenoord yearbook is created.

In January 2024, Feyenoord launched its own streaming service named Feyenoord One. The streaming service provides exclusive documentaries, video series, replays of historical matches and livestreams of select youth academy matches.

== Current squad ==
As of 3 September 2026

Note: Flags indicate national team as defined under FIFA eligibility rules; some limited exceptions apply. Players may hold more than one non-FIFA nationality.

No.	Pos.	Nation	Player
1	GK	GER	Tjark Ernst
2	DF	NED	Bart Nieuwkoop
3	DF	NED	Thomas Beelen
4	DF	JPN	Tsuyoshi Watanabe
5	DF	NED	Gijs Smal
6	DF	NED	Jerry St. Juste
7	MF	POL	Jakub Moder
8	MF	NED	Gjivai Zechiël
10	MF	NED	Luciano Valente (captain)
11	FW	POR	Gonçalo Borges
14	MF	NED	Sem Steijn
15	DF	AUS	Jordan Bos
16	DF	ESP	Javi López (on loan from Real Sociedad)
17	FW	ENG	Reiss Nelson
19	FW	ESP	Nacho Ferri

No.	Pos.	Nation	Player
20	DF	NED	Mats Deijl
22	MF	NED	Tobias van den Elshout
23	FW	ALG	Anis Hadj Moussa
24	DF	NED	Thijs Kraaijeveld
26	DF	NED	Givairo Read
27	FW	MLI	Gaoussou Diarra
28	MF	MAR	Oussama Targhalline
32	DF	NED	Tijme Wessels
33	GK	GER	Florian Kastenmeier
34	MF	BEL	Charles Vanhoutte
35	DF	ESP	Mika Mármol
36	FW	NED	Jivayno Zinhagel
37	GK	SUR	Mannou Berger
39	GK	IRL	Liam Bossin
49	FW	NED	Shaqueel van Persie

=== Out on loan ===
Note: Flags indicate national team as defined under FIFA eligibility rules; some limited exceptions apply. Players may hold more than one non-FIFA nationality.

No.	Pos.	Nation	Player
—	FW	NED	Jaden Slory (at Willem II Tilburg until 30 June 2027)
—	DF	NED	Jan Plug (at Excelsior Rotterdam until 30 June 2027)

No.	Pos.	Nation	Player
—	MF	SUR	Shiloh 't Zand (at Fortuna Sittard until 30 June 2027)

=== Reserve squad ===
As of 18 September 2026

Note: Flags indicate national team as defined under FIFA eligibility rules; some limited exceptions apply. Players may hold more than one non-FIFA nationality.

No.	Pos.	Nation	Player
32	DF	NED	Tijme Wessels
36	FW	NED	Jivayno Zinhagel
50	FW	GRE	Theodoros Delianidis
57	FW	NED	Jerayno Schaken
65	DF	NED	Dani Slory
—	GK	NED	Tim Haksteeg
—	GK	NED	Dylan Tevreden
—	GK	NED	Stenn de Mol
—	DF	NED	Hakeem Agboluaje
—	DF	NED	Twan Schens
—	DF	NED	Dani Slory
—	DF	GHA	Kwame Tabiri
—	DF	NED	Marleyson Cruz
—	DF	NED	Jessy Basfielt
—	DF	CUW	Keyane El Ouansaidi

No.	Pos.	Nation	Player
—	MF	MAR	Nassim El Harmouz
—	MF	CAN	Kevin Khan
—	MF	NED	Zino Sneijer
—	MF	NED	Nick de Koning
—	MF	ITA	Matteo Malasoma
—	MF	NED	Resley Kessels
—	MF	NED	Pieter van Maarschalkerwaard
—	MF	NED	Arman Nahany
—	MF	DEN	Luca Dahl Tomasson
—	MF	MAR	Ilian Hadidi
—	FW	ENG	Emeka Peters
—	FW	NED	Sem Verdonk
—	FW	MEX	Stephano Carrillo
—	FW	NED	Kelvin Neijenhuis
—	FW	NED	Izu Onunta

=== Retired numbers ===
- 12 (Netherlands) Het Legioen (reserved)

== Personnel ==
=== Backroom staff ===
Position	
Head coach	(Netherlands) Giovanni van Bronckhorst
Assistant coach	(Netherlands) John de Wolf
Assistant coach	(Netherlands) Sipke Hulshoff
Assistant coach	(Netherlands) Said Bakkati
Assistant coach	(Netherlands) Davey van den Berg
Goalkeeper coach	(Republic of Ireland) Justin Merz
Set piece coach	(Netherlands) Rody Hoegee
Video analyst	(Netherlands) Yöri Bosschaart
Video analyst	(Netherlands) Rick Mennes
Cameraman Video Analyses	(Netherlands) Joey Klene
Team manager	(Netherlands) Frank Boer
Head of Medical & Performance	(Belgium) Stijn Vandenbroucke
Doctor	(Netherlands) Joost van der Hoek
Head of Performance	(Netherlands) Rick Rietveld
Head of Performance	(Netherlands) Jan Müller
Performance Coach	(Netherlands) Rodney Klooster
Physiotherapist	(Netherlands) Stefan van Meenen
Physiotherapist	(Netherlands) Jasper van Kempen
Physiotherapist	(Japan) Takahiro Nakada
Rehab Physiotherapist	(Netherlands) Ben de Visser
Data and Innovation Analyst	(Netherlands) Folkert Boer
Data and Innovation Analyst	(Portugal) José Fonseca
Kit Manager	(Netherlands) Jesse de Vente
Kit man	(Netherlands) Mitchell Lieshout

== Partnerships ==
=== SC Feyenoord ===
SC Feyenoord are Feyenoord's amateur and youth side, who have played at Varkenoord, directly behind De Kuip since 1949. Sportclub Feyenoord's annual youth trials attract a large number of hopefuls, with thousands of boys attempting to impress the coaches.

The Feyenoord squad typically contains a number of players who joined the club after playing for Sportclub Feyenoord, and several players from Sportclub Feyenoord have progressed to have successful careers at international level, including Puck van Heel, Wim Jansen and Giovanni van Bronckhorst. A number of high-profile managers also started their coaching careers at Varkenoord, including Clemens Westerhof and Leo Beenhakker.

=== Partnerships with other clubs ===
As of 2007, Feyenoord have three formal partnerships, a satellite club arrangement with nearby Excelsior, a partnership with Hungary's Újpest and the Feyenoord Academy in Ghana. The strongest of these partnerships is that with Excelsior, who since 1996 have loaned young Feyenoord players on the verge of the first team. The purpose of this is to allow them to experience regular first-team football, aiding their development while simultaneously strengthening Excelsior's squad. The highest profile players to have played at Excelsior as part of this arrangement are Thomas Buffel and Salomon Kalou, who were both subsequently involved in transfer deals worth several million euros. The partnership between Feyenoord and Excelsior was scaled back in 2006, though the clubs still work together.

Feyenoord's co-operation with Újpest started when Hungarian ex-footballer and former Feyenoord player József Kiprich joined the Hungarian team as an under-19 coach and started as a scout for Feyenoord.

The Feyenoord Ghana academy in arose form a visit by Feyenoord chairman Jorien van den Herik to Abidjan to sign the then unknown Bonaventure Kalou, when Van den Herik contacted with the education institute at Kalou's club. The academy was built in Fetteh, just outside Accra, after go-ahead for and was given by the Chief of Fetteh in 1998. At the academy, young talented African footballers can work on their football skills. In addition to helping their football potential, the students are provided with formal education which is funded by Feyenoord. The Feyenoord Academy currently play their matches in the OneTouch Premier League.

The club have also entered into several other partnerships which are now discontinued, most extensively in Brazil with América and J.J.'s football school in Rio de Janeiro. Other clubs who have previously entered partnerships with Feyenoord include Parramatta Power, Nagoya Grampus Eight, B.93, Helsingborg, Supersport United, Westerlo, Mechelen, Breiðablik, Lyn, SMS Łódź, Omiya Ardija and Jiangsu Shuntian.

The club also set ties with Indian Super League franchise Delhi Dynamos.

On 15 January 2019, Feyenoord announced a partnership with Eerste Divisie club Dordrecht which would see players which are not yet ready for the first team loaned out to Dordrecht.

== Women's team ==
On 31 March 2021, Feyenoord announced that the club would be joining the women's Eredivisie from the start of the 2021–22 season.

=== Backroom staff ===
Position	
Head coach	(Netherlands) Jessica Torny
Assistant coaches	(Netherlands) Ashley van den Dungen (Netherlands) Patty Damsma
Goalkeeping coach	(Netherlands) John Bos
Team manager	(Netherlands) Jonara Bernardina
Physiotherapist	(Netherlands) Marjolein Kusters

== Sponsorships ==
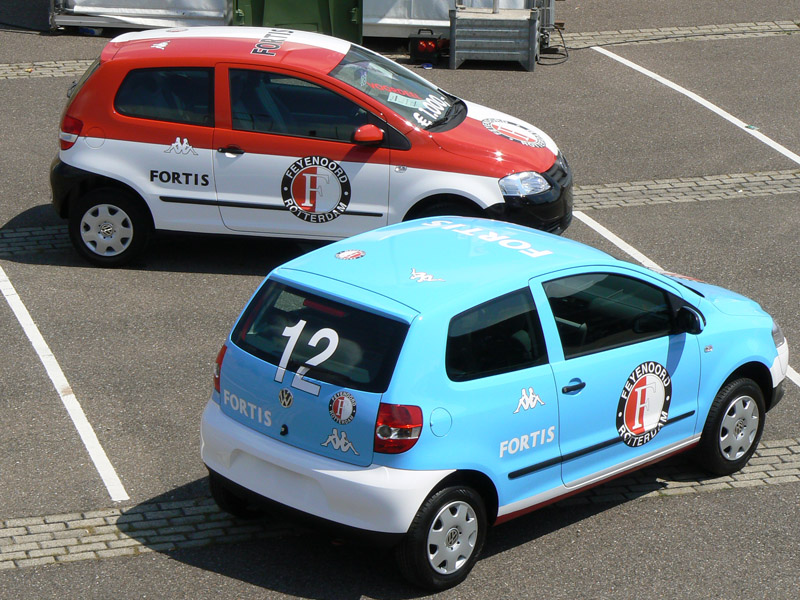
Fortis cars

As of the 1981–82 Eredivisie season, the KNVB allowed the teams participating in the league to use sponsor names on their shirts in exchange for money. At the time, Feyenoord's shirts were produced by Adidas and the first main sponsor was the Dutch Yellow Pages, Gouden Gids. In the second half of the 1982–83 season Adidas were replaced by Puma as the shirt supplier. As a result, the Gouden Gids name was enlarged and was more visible on the shirts. Gouden Gids sponsored the team until 1984, when Opel became the new sponsor. The deal between Feyenoord and Opel lasted until 1989; but, in 1987, Hummel International replaced Puma as the shirt manufacturer.

In 1989, Hummel produced the shirts sponsored by HCS. In 1990, Adidas began producing Feyenoord's kits, however HCS declared bankruptcy shortly thereafter and could no longer sponsor the club. Stad Rotterdam Verzekeringen then began sponsoring Feyenoord in what would turn out to be a long-term partnership: it remained Feyenoord's main sponsor until 2004, when it was taken-over by Fortis. In January 2007, the parties' sponsorship contract was extended until 2009, with the option of Fortis continuing its obligations for an additional three seasons. In 2000, Kappa began producing the club's kits (replacing Adidas) until after the 2008–09 season, when it was replaced by Puma.

When Fortis faced near bankruptcy, its assets were divided among several companies. The same insurance branch which previously sponsored Feyenoord became ASR. To help with their brand recognition, it decided to continue Fortis' sponsor obligations, but in 2011, it announced it would stop its sponsorship deal in the 2012–13 season. However, due to an economic recession, Feyenoord had trouble finding a new shirt sponsor. Feyenoord and ASR therefore reached a compromise: ASR would remain sponsor for one more season, giving Feyenoord the time it needed to find another sponsor. After negotiations with several corporations, Opel became the club's new sponsor, signing a contract until 2018.

== Kit suppliers and shirt sponsors ==
Period	Kit manufacturer	Kit sponsor
1981–82	Adidas	Gouden Gids
1982−84	Puma	Gouden Gids
1984–87	Puma	Opel
1987–89	Hummel	Opel
1989−90	Hummel	HCS
1990−91	Adidas	HCS
1991−2000	Adidas	Stad Rotterdam Verzekeringen
2000−04	Kappa	Stad Rotterdam Verzekeringen
2004−09	Kappa	Fortis
2009−13	Puma	ASR Nederland
2013	Puma	Diergaarde Blijdorp
2013–14	Puma	Opel
2014–17	Adidas	Opel
2017–19	Adidas	Greenchoice
2019	Adidas	Droomparken
2020–2021	Adidas	Droomparken (Eredivisie); EuroParcs (KNVB Cup and Europa League); Toto (Sleeve sponsor)
2021–2023	Adidas	EuroParcs; Toto (Sleeve sponsor)
2023–	Castore	MediaMarkt; Toto (Sleeve sponsor); Prijsvrij Vakanties (Backsponsor)

== See also ==
- Dutch football league teams
- List of world champion football clubs
