= Goole (disambiguation) =

Goole is a town located in the East Riding of Yorkshire, UK.

Goole may also refer to:

- Goole and Pocklington, constituency represented in the Parliament of the United Kingdom
- Brigg and Goole, defunct constituency
- Goole (UK Parliament constituency), defunct constituency
- Goole Rural District, defunct rural district in the West Riding of Yorkshire, UK
- Goole Fields, a civil parish in the East Riding of Yorkshire, UK
- Goole (rugby league), a club in the Yorkshire town
- "Goole" (Drifters), a 2014 television episode
- HMS Goole (1918), first world war minesweeper
- A character in J. B. Priestley's play An Inspector Calls

== See also ==
- Gool (disambiguation)
