= Goirle =

- Municipality
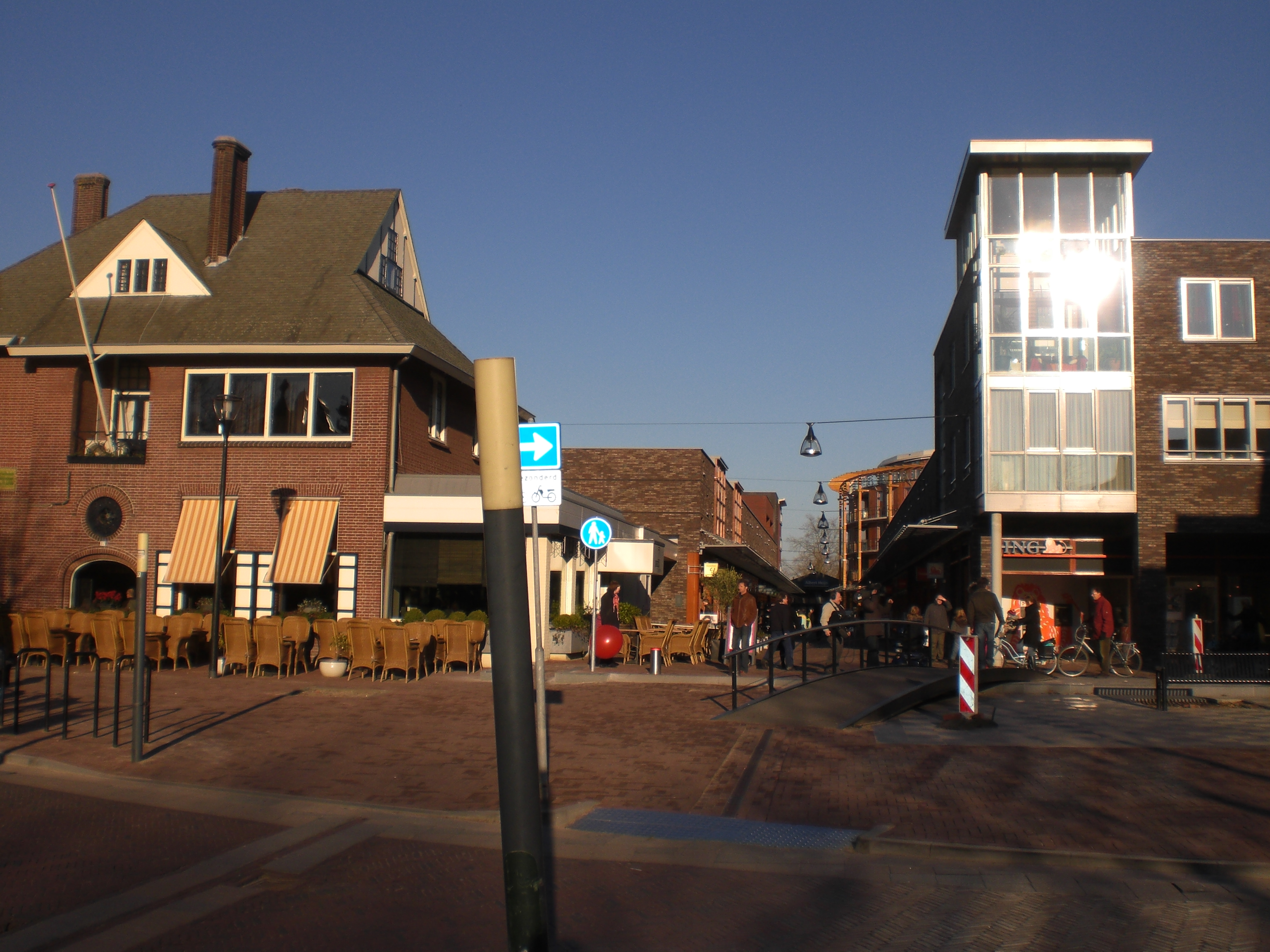
- Goirle town centre

- Flag Coat of arms

- Location in North Brabant
- Coordinates: 51°31′N 5°4′E
- Country: Netherlands
- Province: North Brabant

Government
  - Body: Municipal council
  - Mayor: Mark van Stappershoef (CDA)

Area
  - Total: 43.38 km^{2} (16.75 sq mi)
  - Land: 42.99 km^{2} (16.60 sq mi)
  - Water: 0.39 km^{2} (0.15 sq mi)
- Elevation: 16 m (52 ft)

Population (January 2021)
  - Total: 23,952
  - Density: 557/km^{2} (1,440/sq mi)
- Demonym: Goirlenaar
- Time zone: UTC+1 (CET)
  - Summer (DST): UTC+2 (CEST)
- Postcode: 5050–5053, 5133
- Area code: 013
- Website: www.goirle.nl

Goirle (pronounced [ˈɣoːrlə]) is a municipality and town in the southern Netherlands, in the province of North Brabant. Part of the suburban area of the city of Tilburg, it shares with it its phone area code and public transport system.

The municipality also includes the villages of Breehees and Riel.

== Topography ==
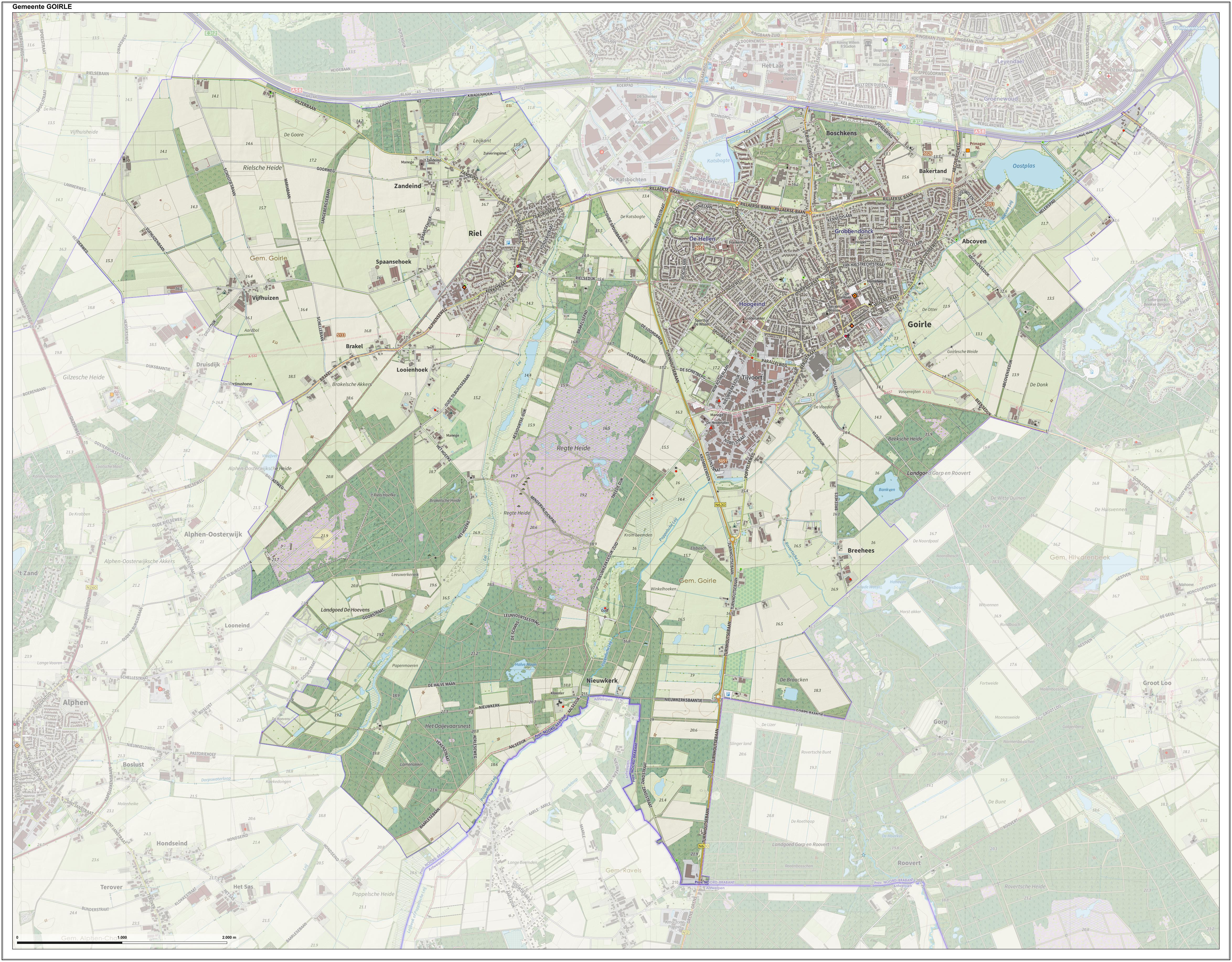

Dutch Topographic map of the municipality of Goirle, June 2015

== Notable people ==
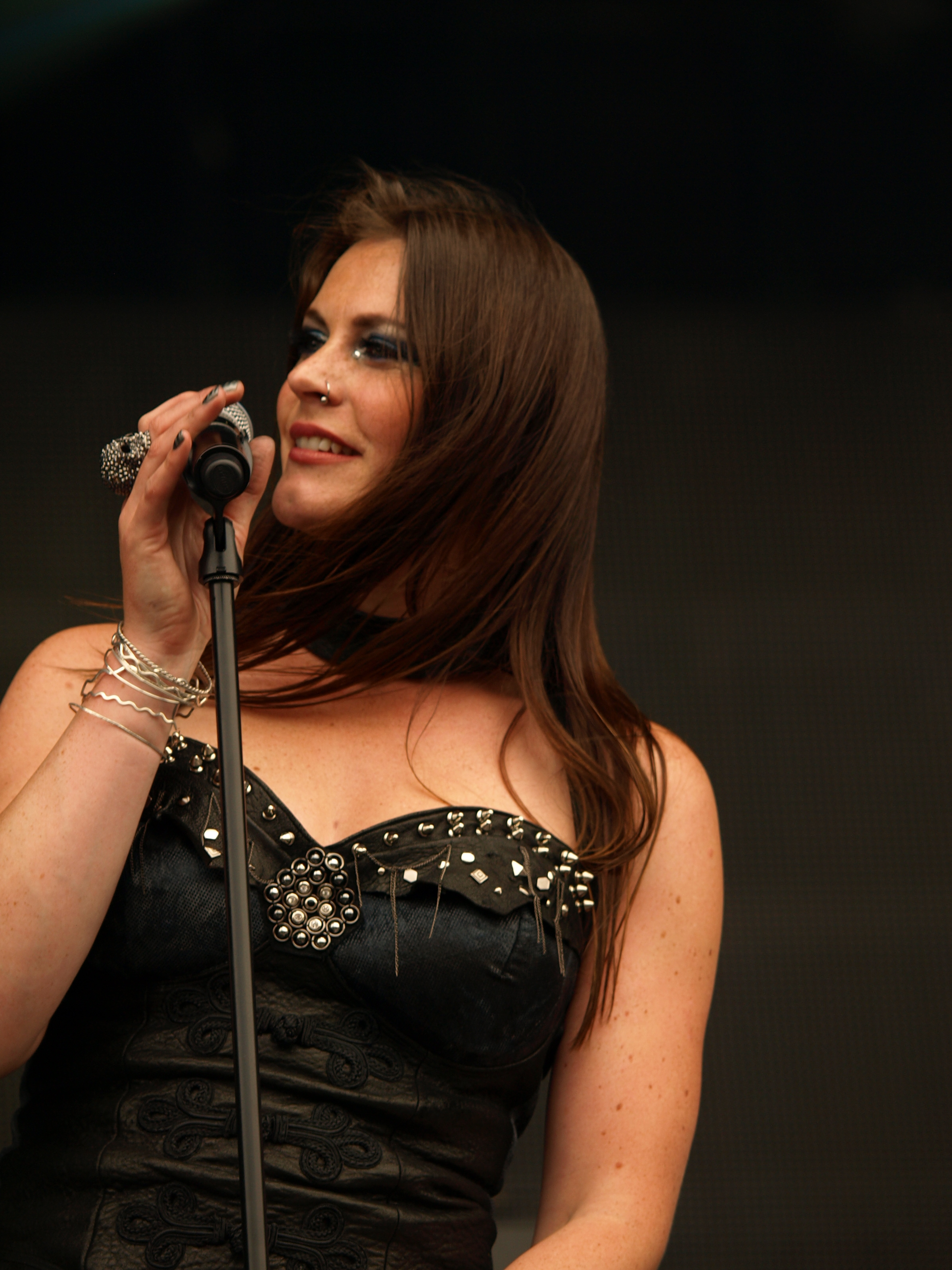
Floor Jansen, 2013

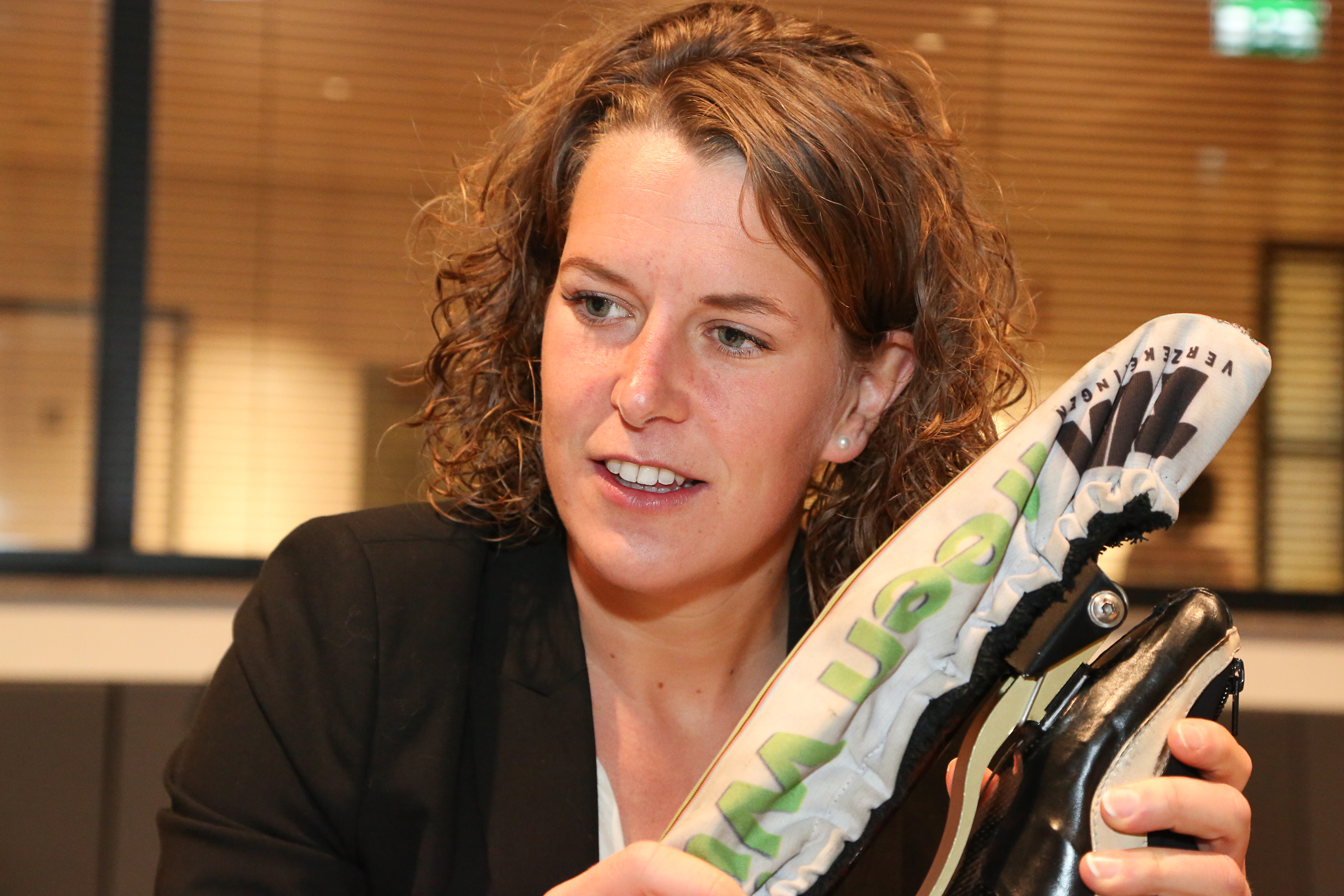
Ireen Wüst, 2013

- Max Steenberghe (1899–1972) a Dutch politician and Govt. minister
- John Boxtel (born 1930) a Dutch sculptor of woodcarvings and an art teacher
- Pepijn van Erp (born 1972) a Dutch mathematician, skeptical activist and chess player
- Jan Taminiau (born 1975) a Dutch clothes designer
- Floor Jansen (born 1981) a Dutch singer, songwriter and lead vocalist of Finnish symphonic metal band Nightwish

=== Sport ===
- Tiest van Gestel (1881–1969) an archer and team gold medallist at the 1920 Summer Olympics
- Huub Zilverberg (born 1939) a Dutch former professional road bicycle racer
- Martin van Geel (born 1960) a retired Dutch footballer with over 430 club caps
- Mathieu Hermans (born 1963) a former Dutch professional road bicycle racer
- Roy Hendriksen (born 1969) a Dutch professional football manager, coach and former player with 438 club caps
- Edwin Hermans (born 1974) a Dutch former footballer with over 360 club caps
- Amanda Hopmans (born 1976) a former professional tennis player
- Björn van der Doelen (born 1976) a retired football midfielder with 249 club caps and a singer/songwriter
- Marcel Meeuwis (born 1980) is a Dutch former footballer with 300 club caps
- Joris Mathijsen (born 1980) a Dutch former footballer with 409 club caps
- Ireen Wüst (born 1986) a Dutch long track allround speed skater, winner of eleven Olympic medals
- Eefje Muskens (born 1989) a Dutch badminton player, competed in the 2016 Summer Olympics
- Michael Kuiper (born 1989 in Riel) a Dutch mixed martial artist
- Virgil Misidjan (born 1993) a Dutch footballer

== Gallery ==
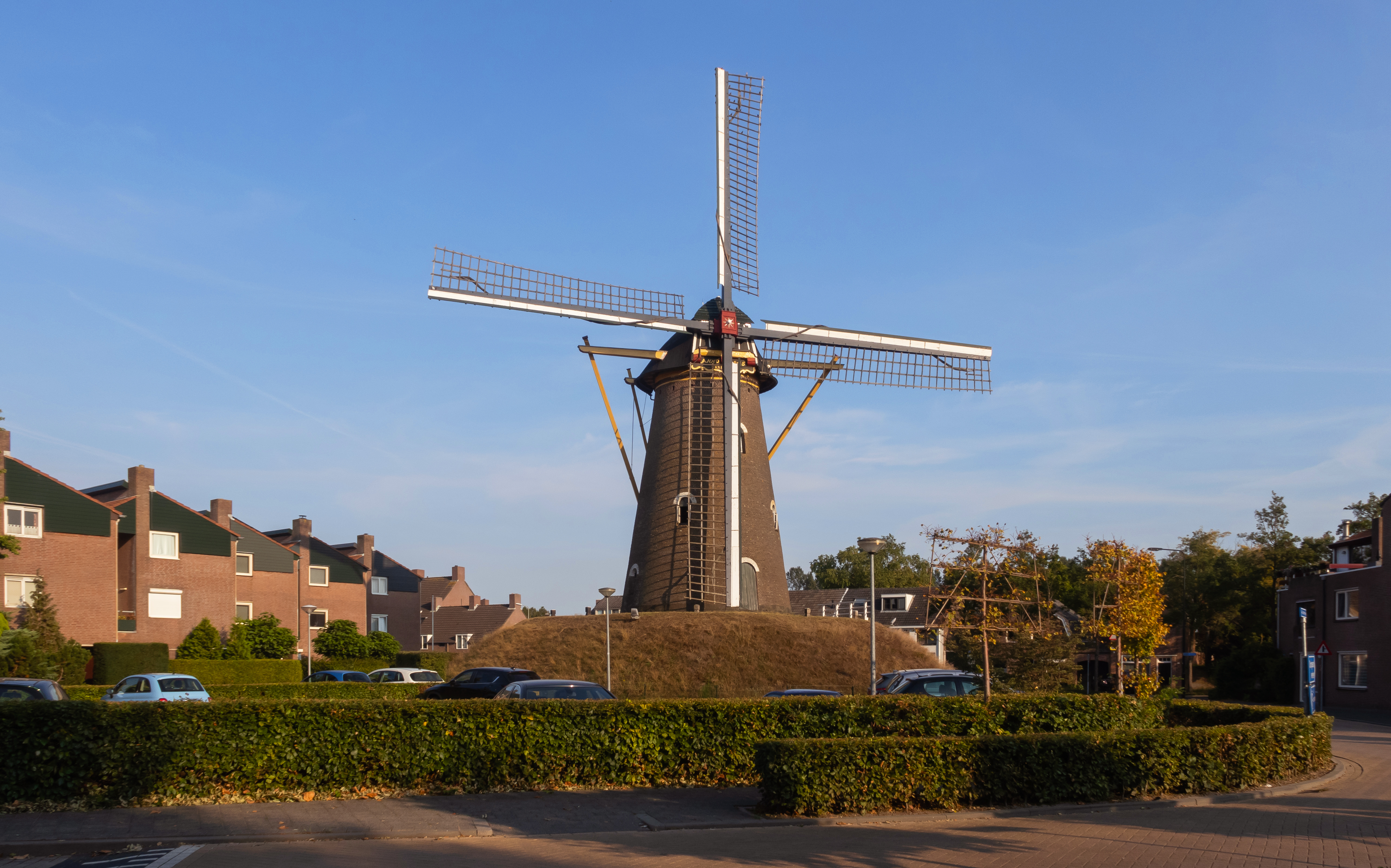
Windmill

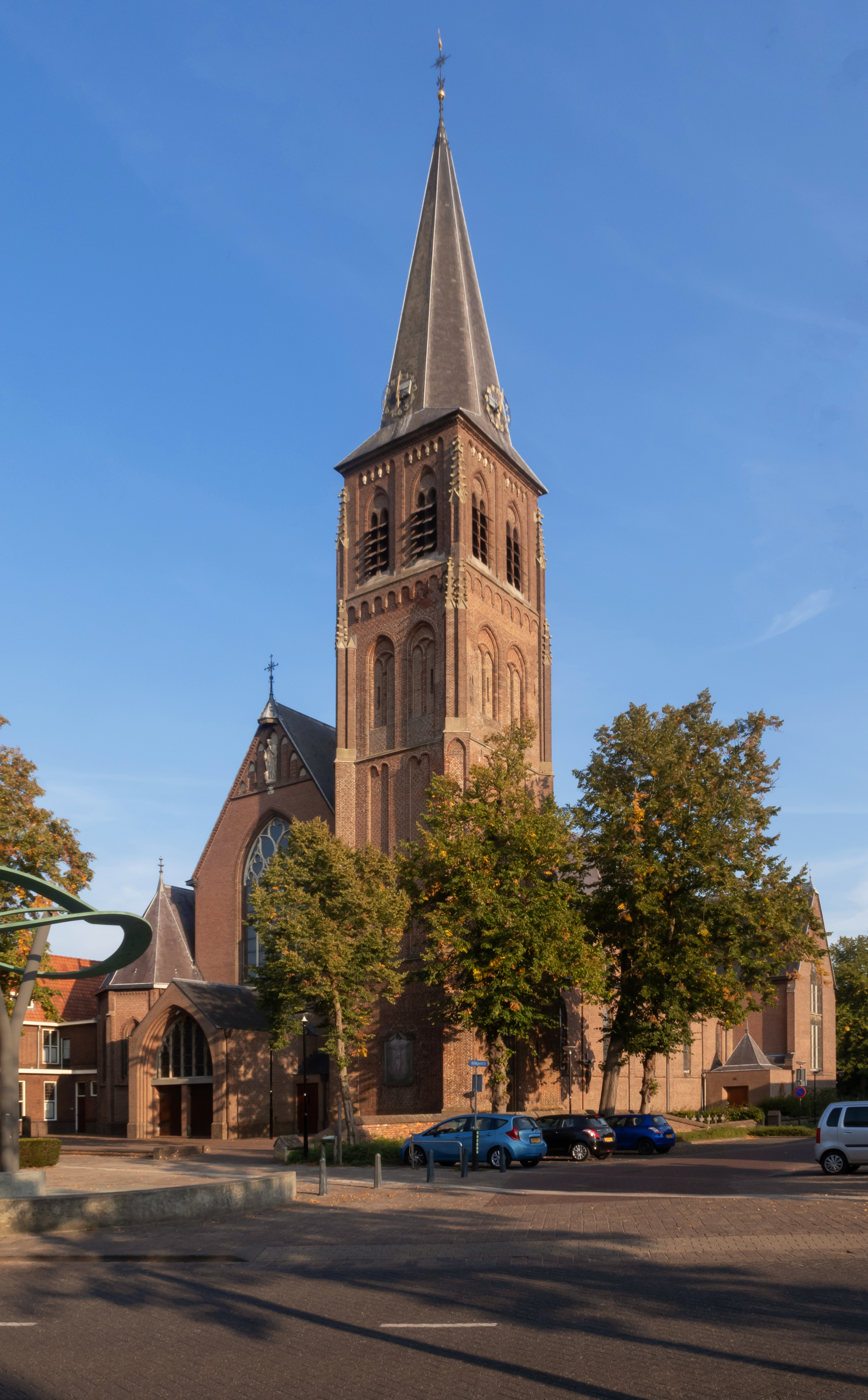
Church

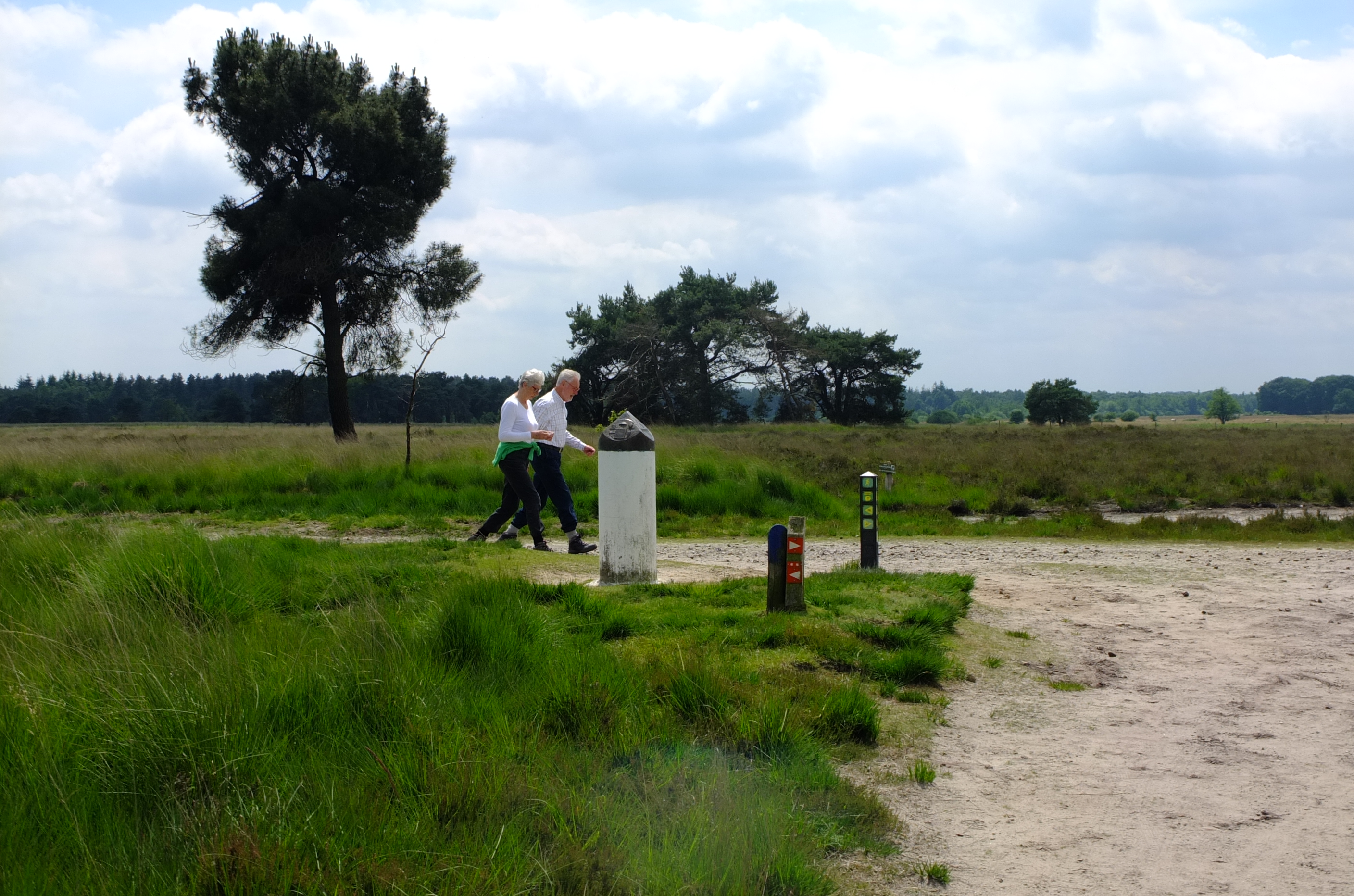
Regte Heide

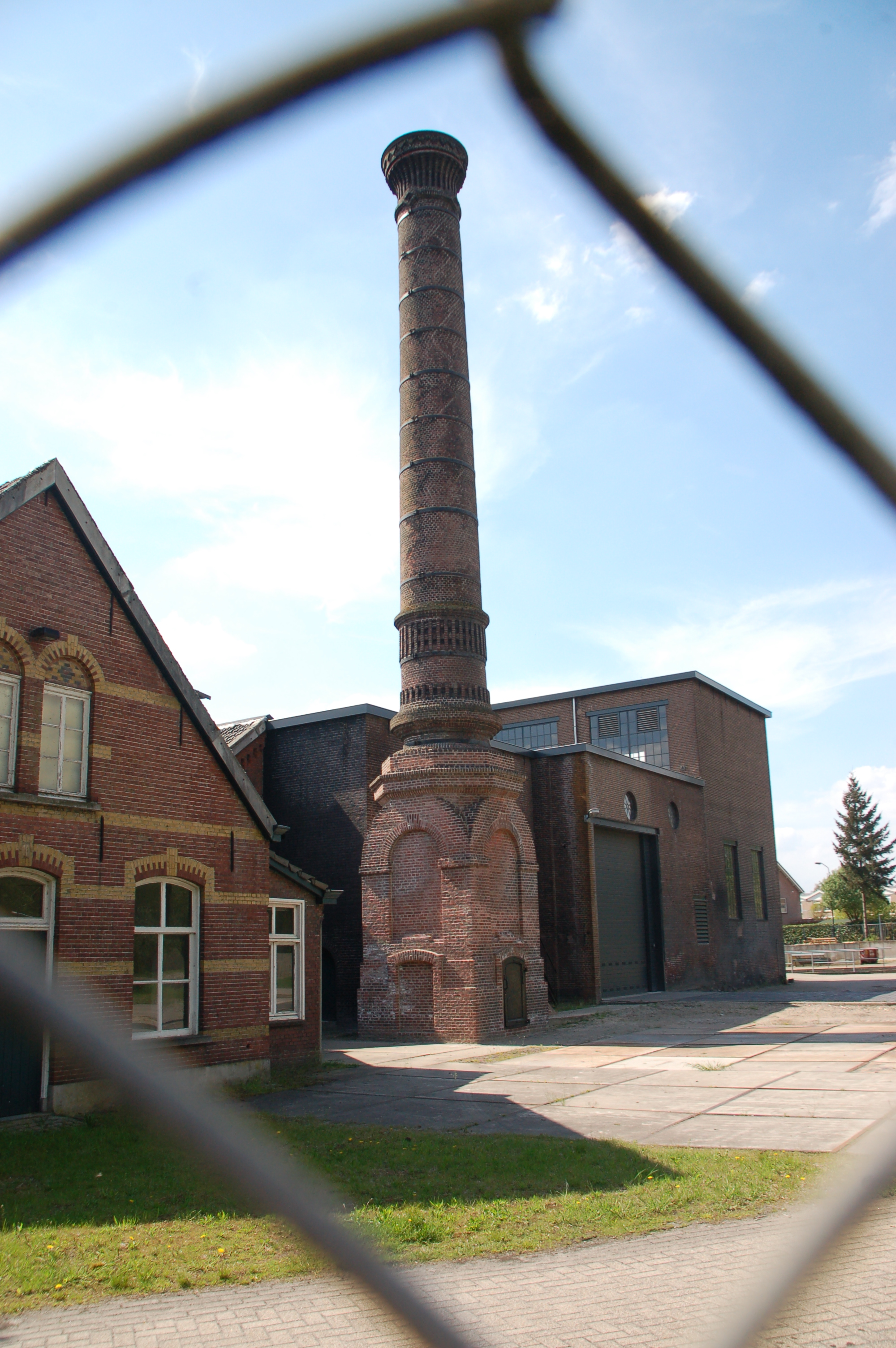
Schoorsteen HAVEP

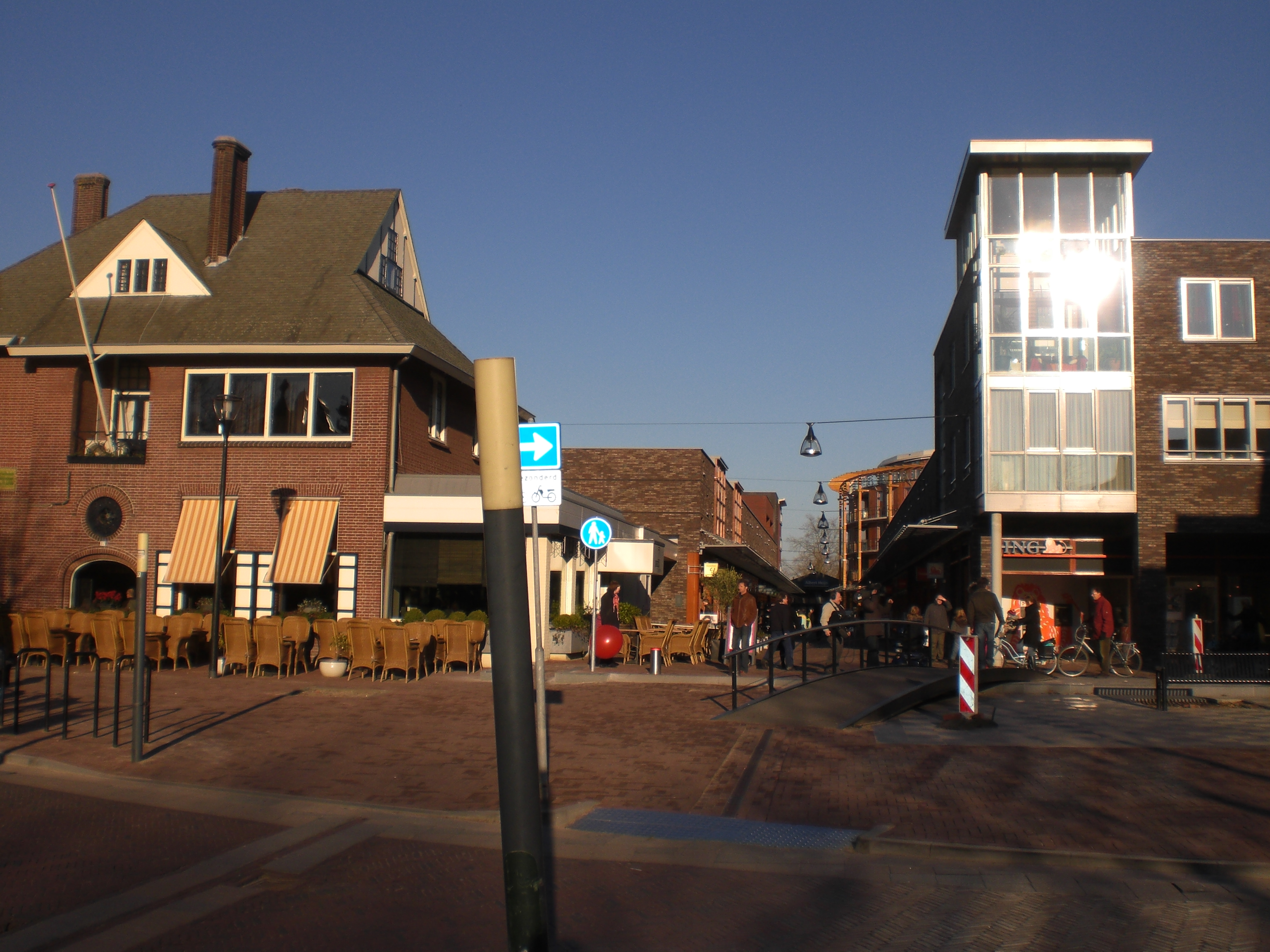
De Hovel

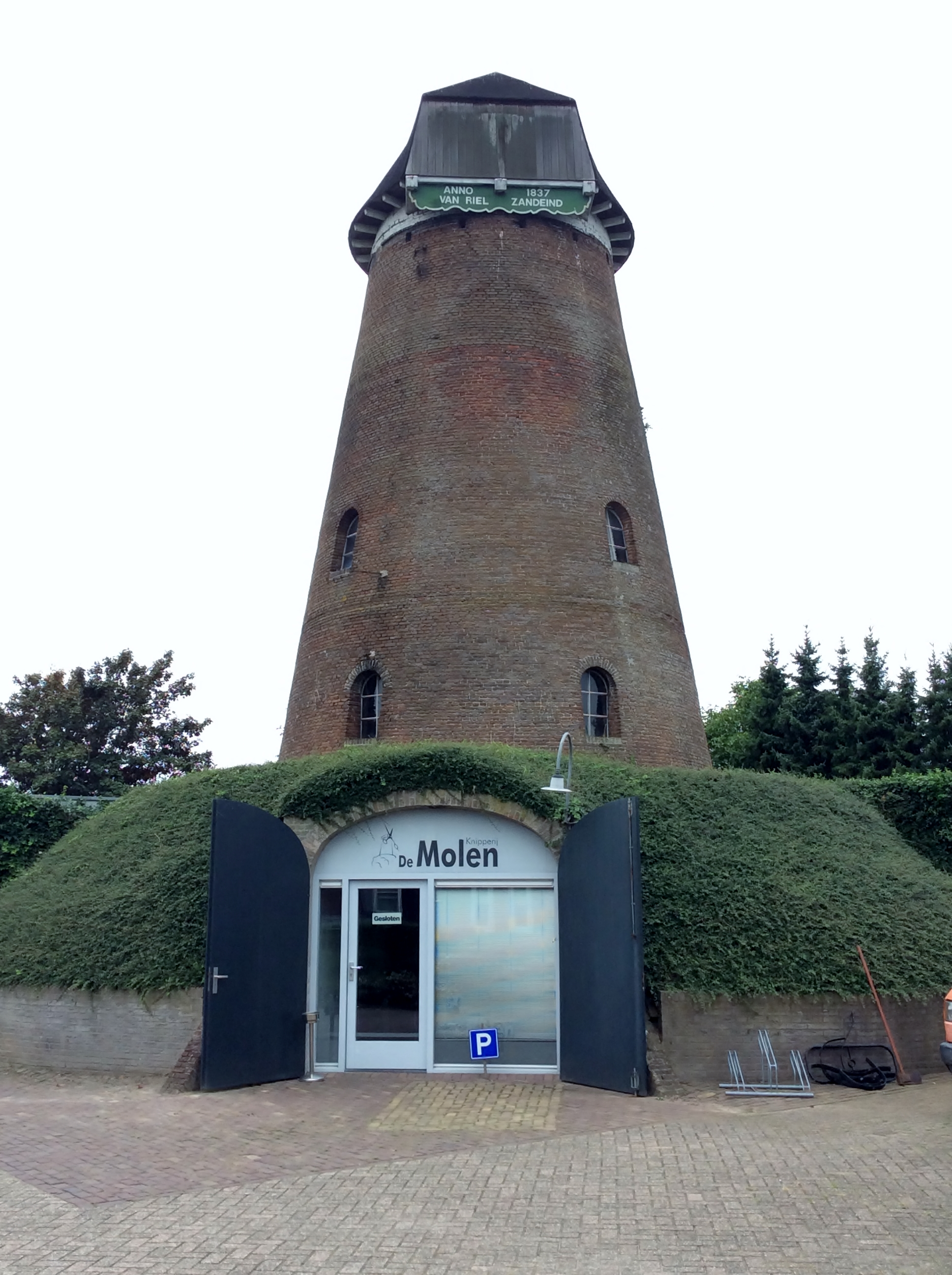
Molenromp Rielvoor

== See also ==
- Van Gool, a Dutch surname meaning "from Goirle".
