= Martin van Geel =

Dutch footballer

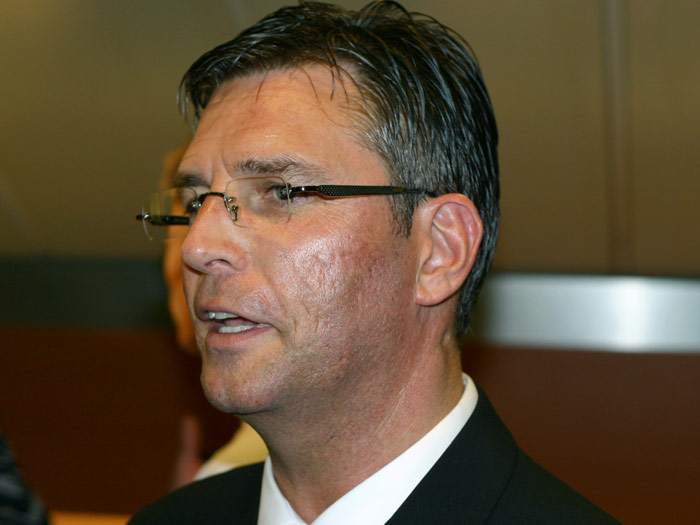

Personal information
- Full name: Martin van Geel
- Date of birth: 27 November 1960 (age 65)
- Place of birth: Goirle, Netherlands
- Position: Midfielder

Youth career
- VOAB Goirle

Senior career*
Years	Team	Apps	(Gls)
1977–1979	Willem II	31	(3)
1979–1981	Ajax	22	(9)
1981–1988	Roda JC	198	(53)
1988–1990	Feyenoord	50	(24)
1990–1995	Willem II	133	(41)
Total		434	(130)

International career^{‡}
1980	Netherlands U21	1	(0)

Managerial career
- 1995–2002: Willem II (technical director)
- 2002–2005: AZ (technical director)
- 2005–2007: Ajax (technical director)
- 2008–2011: Roda JC (technical director)
- 2011–2019: Feyenoord (technical director)
- 2019–2024: Willem II (managing director)
- * Club domestic league appearances and goals as of 8 June 2007 ‡ National team caps and goals as of 8 June 2007

Martin van Geel (born 27 November 1960 in Goirle) is a Dutch retired footballer who was active as a midfielder.

== Playing career ==
=== Club ===
Born in Goirle to a car mechanic and a cleaning lady, Van Geel started playing football at hometown club VOAB and made his professional debut on at 24 August 1977 Willem II, and also played for Ajax, Roda JC and Feyenoord.

=== International ===
Van Geel was capped once by the Netherlands national under-21 football team.

== TD career ==
After his playing career ended, Van Geel moved into the front offices of a number of Dutch football clubs, holding technical director positions at AZ, Ajax, Roda JC, Feyenoord, and most recently Willem II, which earned promotion back into the Eredivisie in 2024 under Van Geel's stewardship. It was announced on 16 May 2024 that, on 1 July, Van Geel would be stepping down from his position with Willem II and assuming the role of technical manager of the Eredivisie.

== Honours ==
Ajax

- Eredivisie: 1979–80
