= Jan Müller =

Jan Müller may refer to:

- Jan Müller (artist) (1922–1958), New York figurative expressionist of the 1950s
- Jan Harmensz. Muller (1571–1628), Flemish engraver and painter
- Jan Allan Müller (born 1969), Faroese football striker
- Jan Müller, trans music producer with X-Dream
- Jan Müller (executive) (1967), CEO of the National Film and Sound Archive of Australia

== See also ==
- Jan Müller-Wieland (born 1966), German composer and conductor of classical music
