= Van Gool =

Van Gool is a Dutch toponymic surname, meaning "from Goirle". Gool [ɣoːl] represents an approximation of the regional pronunciation of Goirle. Notable people with the surname include:

- Jacob van Gool (1596–1667), Dutch Orientalist and mathematician better known by his Latinized name Jacobus Golius
- Jan van Gool (1685–1763), Dutch painter and art historian
- Jean Van Gool (1931–1986), French footballer
- Jef Van Gool (born 1935), Belgian footballer
- Roger Van Gool (born 1950), Belgian footballer
- Wilma van Gool-van den Berg (born 1947), Dutch sprinter
