= Tom Manders (Dutch artist) =

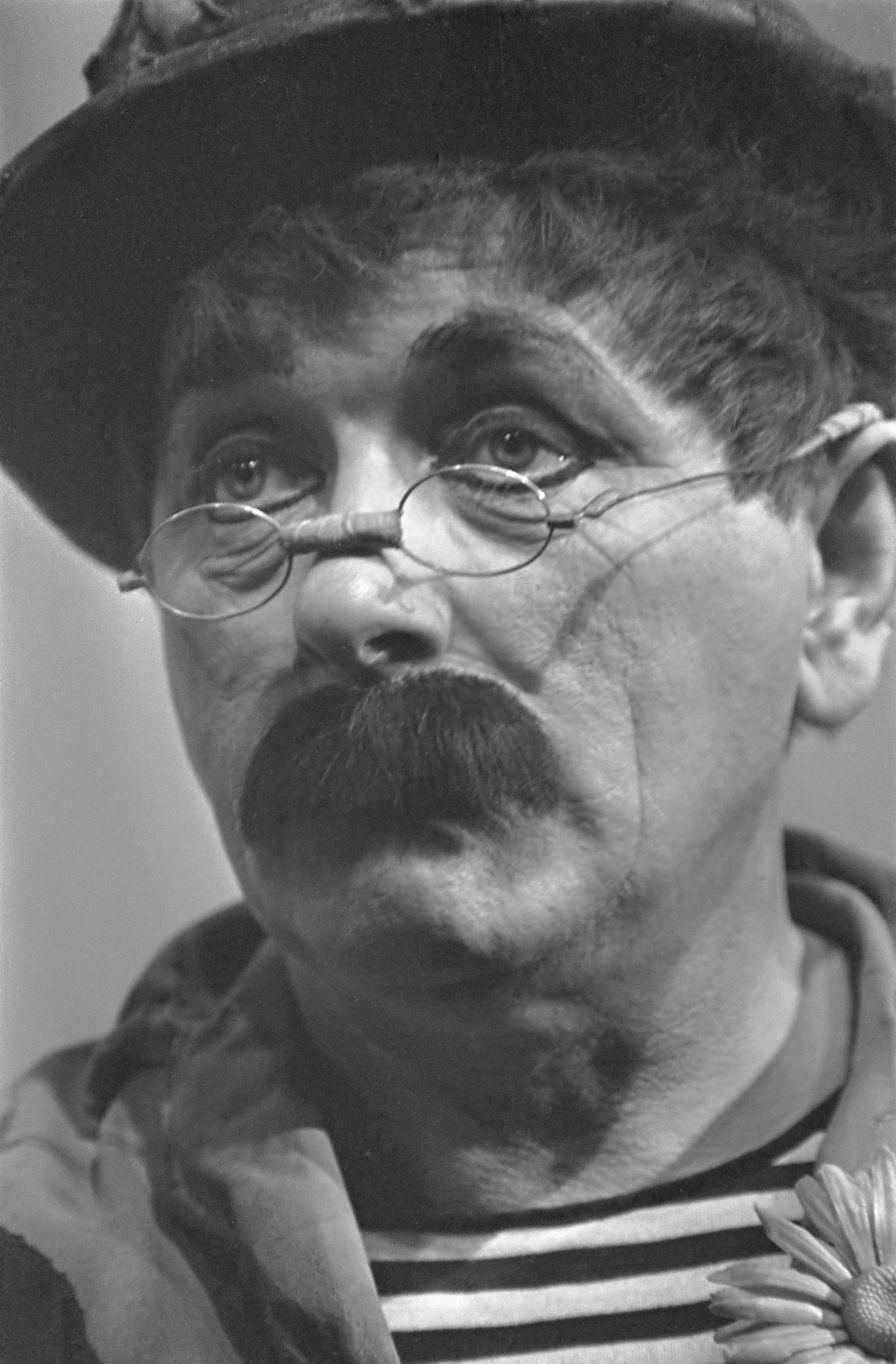
- Manders in 1968

Background information
- Also known as: Dorus
- Born: Antoon (Tom) Manders; 23 October 1921; The Hague, Netherlands
- Died: 26 February 1972 (aged 50) Utrecht, Netherlands
- Years active: 1953–1971

Antoon (Tom) Manders (23 October 1921 – 26 February 1972) was a Dutch artist, comedian and cabaret performer. In later role, he became better known as Dorus.

== Biography ==
Although his birth was officially recorded as having occurred on 24 October, he was actually born on the 23rd. His father had him registered one day later because he would not get a day off work for a child born on Sunday.

Already at a young age, his talent for drawing became apparent. He attended the Royal Academy of Art in The Hague, Netherlands for 3 years and was active, among other things, as an advertisement painter and designer of posters. Later he also designed decors for theatre and cabaret regularly for Lou Bandy, Wim Kan and theatre Carré in Amsterdam.

During World War II, Manders had to work in Germany but after half a year, he fled from his job as a painter. Because of Wim Kan, Manders got the idea to start doing cabaret himself, like his older brother Kees.

Starting in 1953, Manders was involved with the design of Carel Kamlag's cafe Saint-Germain-des-Prés (Amsterdam) at the Rembrandtplein in Amsterdam. Manders performed there himself as a vagabond, a role that would later become famous as Dorus. When VARA offered him an opportunity to perform on television, he had the cafe copied in the studio and started a successful show that would be broadcast for several years.

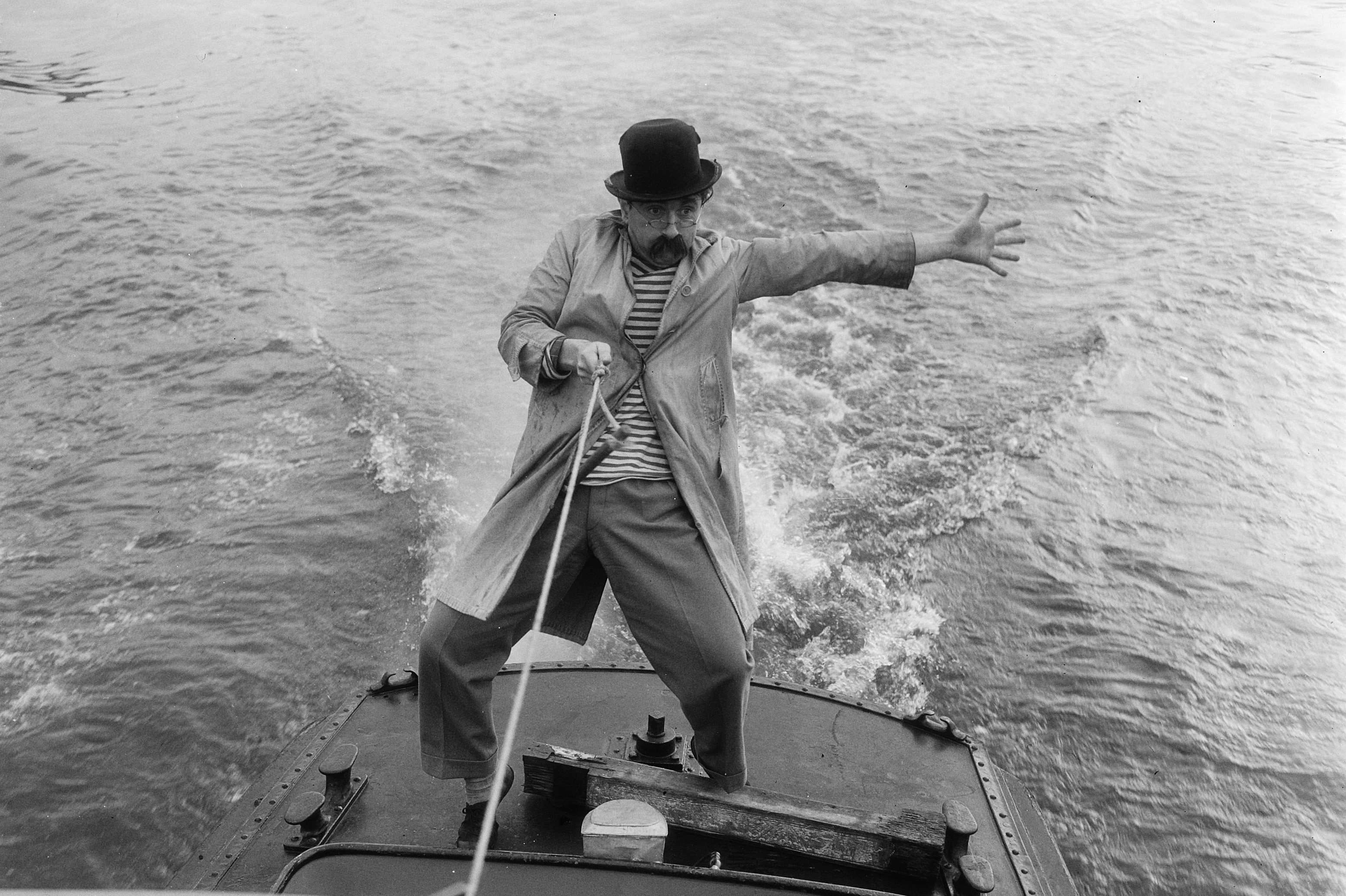
Clowning as a waterskier on the Amstel, in 1955

Between 1956 and 1962, Manders worked together with organist Cor Steyn for the program De Showboat. Together they created tracks like Twee motten (two moths), Als ik wist dat je zou komen (had I known you would come by) en Bij de marine (in the navy).

Manders got into financial trouble when he tried to produce Dorus movies. In 1967, he won the Zilveren Roos prize and started a new program, Bij Dorus op schoot (on Dorus' lap). In a particularly famous scene from 18 November, a young girl tries to sing the famous Dutch children song Poessie Mauw, of which she endlessly repeated only the title.

Also in 1967, the former chemical products business on the Mauritsstraat 65 in Rotterdam was converted to Cabaret Dorus. This only lasted until 1970 and with the closing of Cabaret Dorus, the show Bij Dorus op schoot also ended. Since 1985, there is a block of houses in the same location named the Tom Mandershof.

In 1971, Dorus made one more television appearance, in which he scared visitors of Madame Tussauds by pretending to be a wax statue. In the same year, he had another musical hit with In de hemel is geen bier (there is no beer in heaven).

In February 1972, Manders had a car accident. In the hospital, he was diagnosed with cancer. Three weeks later he died of a heart attack.

== Musical ==
In 2009/2010 Albert Verlinde produced a musical about the life of Tom Manders with the title Dorus, the musical. Karel de Rooij and Peter de Jong, better known as Mini & Maxi, played the main roles. The show was written by Lars Boom and Dick van den Heuvel and directed by Peter de Baan.
