= Ghoul (disambiguation) =

A ghoul is an evil spirit in Arabian folklore.

Ghoul may also refer to:

== In comics ==
- Ghoul (comics), a fictional character in the Marvel Universe
- Ra's al Ghul, a fictional character in the DC Universe
  - Nyssa al Ghul, a fictional character in the DC Universe and the second child of Ra's al Ghul
  - Talia al Ghul, a fictional character in the DC Universe and the third child of Ra's al Ghul
- Ghouls (Yu-Gi-Oh!), a group of fictional characters in the manga series, also known as the "Rare Hunters"
- Preta Ghoul, a fictional character in the manga series Black Cat
- Tokyo Ghoul, a manga series by Sui Ishida

== In literature ==
- Ghoul (novel), a 2007 novel by Brian Keene
- Ghoul, a 1987 novel by Michael Slade

== In music ==
- Ghoul (band), an American thrash metal band
- The Ghoul, a song by Pentagram from the 2002 album Turn to Stone
- Ghul, stage name of English guitarist Charles Hedger (born 1980)

== Onscreen ==
=== In film ===
- The Ghoul (1933 film), a British horror film
- The Ghoul (1975 film), a British horror film
- The Ghouls, a 2003 American independent horror film
- Ghoul (2015 film), a Czech horror film
- The Ghoul (2016 film), a British thriller film

=== In games ===
- Ghoul (Dungeons & Dragons), a creature in the Dungeons & Dragons roleplaying game
- Ghoul (Fallout), a fictional race in the video game series Fallout
- Ghouls (video game), a 1984 video game

=== In television ===
- Ghoul, a fictional character on the television show The Ghoul Show
- Ghoul, a fictional species in the anime television series Divergence Eve
- Ghoul (TV character), a fictional character in the television series Fallout
- Ghoul (miniseries), an Indian horror television miniseries
- "The Ghouls", an episode of the television series Fallout
