= Sima Bina =

Iranian musical artist

Sima Bina سیما بینا
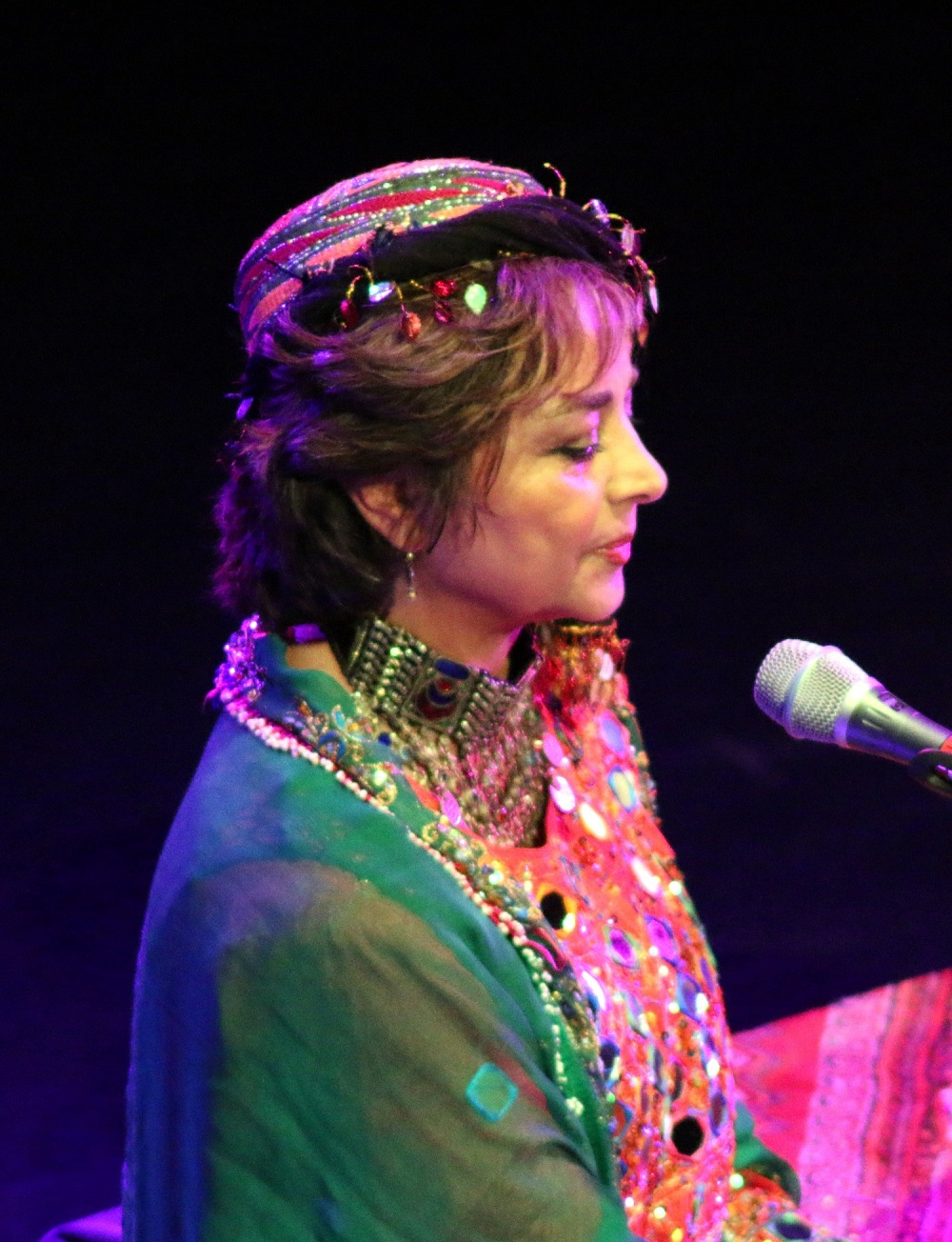
- Bina at Isala Theater, the Netherlands in 2014

Background information
- Born: Simā Binā; 4 January 1945 (age 81)
- Origin: Birjand, Iran
- Genre: Persian traditional music
- Occupations: Singer, composer, researcher
- Instruments: Voice, setar, dayereh
- Years active: 1960s–present
- Website: sima-bina.com

Sima Bina (Persian: سیما بینا, Simā Binā, born 4 January 1945) is an Iranian traditional musician, composer, researcher, painter and teacher, described by Radio WDR Germany as the "grand lady of Iranian folk music". Bina's performing arts career has spanned more than five decades. Bina has gathered and revived a collection of nearly forgotten Iranian folk songs and melodies. She has done extensive research on their origin, which included collecting, recording, writing and re-interpreting popular regional music. Her works cover the entire spectrum of Iranian folk music, including Mazandarani music, Kurdish music, Turkmen music, Baloch music, Lur music, Shirazi music, Bakhtiari music, and the music of North and South Khorasan.

== Early life and career ==
Born in Birjand, Khorasan, in the heart of the popular tradition, she started her career on Iranian radio at the age of nine, under the guidance of her father, Ahmad Bina – a master of Iranian classical music and poet who wrote many of her early songs. Bina studied the radif repertoire and avaz vocal technique with great masters such as Maaroufi and Zarrin Panjeh. She acquired her own solo program, Golhaye Sahraii (Flowers of the Desert), presenting a collection of folk songs and music from various regions of Iran.

After graduating from Tehran University in 1969, majoring in fine arts, Sima Bina continued her musical studies and perfected her knowledge of the radio under the direction of Master Davami. Since 1993, she has accepted invitations to perform her music worldwide in festivals and organized concerts featuring Persian classical music. She currently lives between Cologne, Germany and Tehran, Iran.

== Iranian Lullabies ==
While pursuing Iranian folksongs, Sima Bina often came across a variety of ethnic lullabies, which she added to her collected works. This collection finally led to the creation of a book, called Iranian Lullabies in 2009. In this book, Bina not only shares her findings, her perception, the scores and visual expression of the selected lullabies with mothers but also presents forty original Iranian lullabies in four volumes, where her vocals are sometimes blended in with the singing of the mothers, who had sung the lullabies to her in different parts of Iran.

== See also ==
- List of Iranian musicians
- Music of Iran
