= John Floore =

Dutch trumpeter (1945–2020)

John Floore (21 July 1945 – 5 December 2020) was a trumpeter from the Netherlands who played with the Rotterdam Philharmonic Orchestra, was a director of the Rotterdam Conservatory of Music and managed the Limburg Symphony Orchestra before becoming artistic director of the Bangkok Symphony Orchestra.

== Career ==
Born in Weesp, North Holland, Floore was educated at the Amsterdam School of the Arts between 1961 and 1966. He became principal trumpet with the Rotterdam Philharmonic Orchestra in 1966. He worked with guest conductors such as Eugene Ormandy, Antal Doráti, Lorin Maazel, Simon Rattle, Kurt Masur and André Previn. In 1983 he made the transition to music administration, taking the position of Director of the Rotterdam Conservatory of Music. At the Conservatory he was general manager of the Havo voor Muziek en Dans (Academy for Music and Dance). He was treasurer of the "International Double Reed Festival Rotterdam 1995" foundation.

After leaving the conservatory, Floore was general manager of the Limburgs Symfonie Orkest (LSO) from 1997 to 2009. He visited Thailand often and served as a consultant to the Bangkok Symphony Orchestra before replacing Hikotaro Yazaki as artistic director in March 2009.

Floore died on 5 December 2020 in Cuijk, North Brabant, aged 75.

== Discography ==
Selected recordings:

Year	Title	Label	Notes
1969	Reconstructie	Steim	with Louis Andriessen, Reinbert de Leeuw, Misha Mengelberg, Peter Schat, Jan van Vlijmen
1974	Novara	Composers Recordings Inc. (CRI)	on Music By Earle Brown (LP), Earle Brown
1997	De Volharding	Composers' Voice	CD, MiniAlbum, Louis Andriessen. Recorded live at the Carré Theatre, Amsterdam on 12 May 1972.
	Time Machine	BV Haast Records	Otto Ketting
