= Tableau vivant =

Static scene containing one or more actors or models

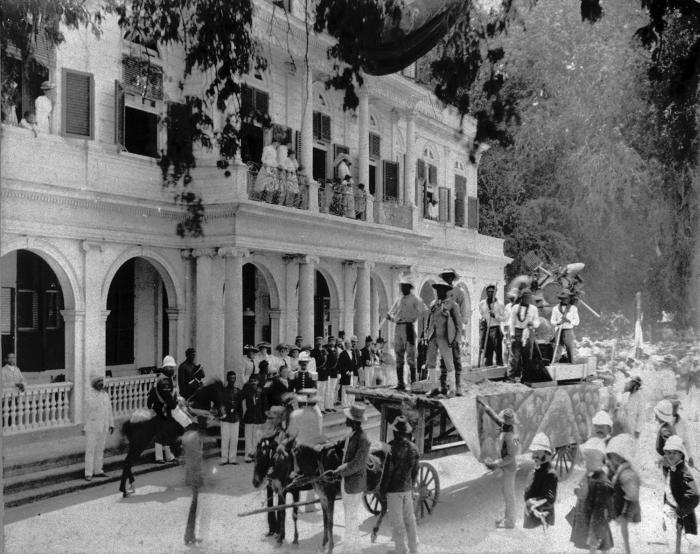
Outdoor tableau vivant about gold mining in Paramaribo, 1892, in front of what is now the Presidential Palace of Suriname, then the Dutch Governor's palace.

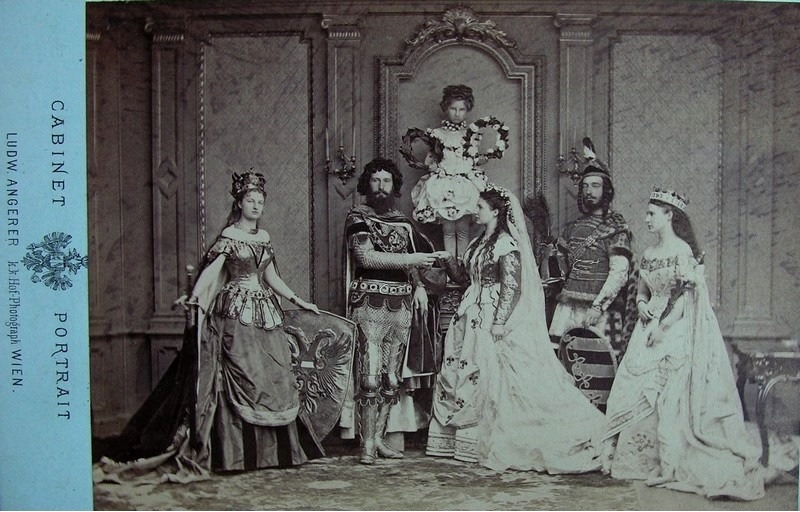
A group of European royalty pose in costumes in 1860s Vienna

A tableau vivant (French: [tablo vivɑ̃]; often shortened to tableau; pl. tableaux vivants; French for 'living picture') is a static scene containing one or more actors or models. They are stationary and silent, usually in costume, carefully posed, with props and/or scenery, and may be theatrically illuminated. It thus combines aspects of theatre and the visual arts.

They were a popular medieval form that revived considerably from the 19th century, probably as they were very suitable for recording by photography. The participants were now mostly amateurs, participating in a quick and easy form of amateur dramatics that could be brought together in an evening, and required little skill in acting or speaking. They were also popular for various sorts of community events and parades.

In the late 19th and early 20th centuries, there was also a type of tableau used in the professional theatre, taking advantage of the extra latitude the law allowed for the display of nudity so long as the actors did not move. Tableaux featured poses plastiques ('flexible poses') by virtually nude models, providing a form of erotic entertainment, both on stage and in print.

Tableaux continue to the present day in the form of living statues, street performers who busk by posing in costume. Another present day example of tableaux vivants is live nativity scenes. In film or live theatre, the performers sometimes briefly freeze in position for a tableau vivant effect.

== History ==
In the Middle Ages, occasionally a Mass was punctuated with short dramatic scenes and painting-like tableaux. They were a major feature of festivities for royal weddings, coronations and royal entries into cities. Often the actors imitated statues or paintings, much in the manner of modern street entertainers, but in larger groups, and mounted on elaborate temporary stands along the path of the main procession. Johan Huizinga, in The Autumn of the Middle Ages, describes the use and design of tableaux vivants in the Late Middle Ages. Many paintings and sculptures probably recreate tableaux vivants, by which art historians sometimes account for groups of rather static figures. Artists were often the designers of public pageantry of this sort.

The history of Western visual arts in general, until the modern era, has had a focus on symbolic, arranged presentation, and (aside from direct personal portraiture) was heavily dependent on stationary artists' models in costume – which can be regarded as small-scale tableaux vivants with the artist as temporary audience. The Realism movement, with more naturalistic depictions, did not begin until the mid-19th century, a direct reaction against Romanticism and its heavy dependence on stylized tableau format.

The invention of photography caused a revival in the form. Initially photography was expensive, and the form flourished in the English country house parties of the rich. Queen Victoria was an early adopter (only taking the part of the audience herself). In the mid-1850s the actors were her children, who performed tableaux for their parents 14th wedding anniversary in 1854. By the 1890s the settings had become very elaborate, as when her third son Prince Arthur, Duke of Connaught and Strathearn, his wife and their three children posed for a Japanese Scene, in 1891.

They became popular for community events and festivals, very often using children, who might parade before settling into a tableau for the audience and a camera.

== On stage ==
A tableau vivant on May 29, 1897, in the Girls High School (San Francisco) by Union Army veterans, at right, who sang "Tenting on the Old Camp Ground".

Before radio, film and television, tableaux vivants were popular forms of entertainment, even in American frontier towns. Before the age of colour reproduction of images, the tableau was sometimes used to recreate artworks on stage, based on an etching or sketch of a painting. This could be done as an amateur venture in a drawing room, or as a more professionally produced series of tableaux presented on a theatre stage, one following another, usually to tell a story without requiring all the usual trappings and production of a full theatre performance. They thus influenced the form taken by later Victorian and Edwardian era magic lantern shows, and perhaps also sequential narrative comic strips (which first appeared in modern form in the late 1890s).

Tableaux vivants were often performed as part of school Nativity plays in England during the Victorian period; the custom is still practised at Loughborough High School (believed to be one of England's oldest grammar schools for girls). Several tableaux are performed each year at the school carol service, including the depiction of an engraving en grisaille (in which the subjects are painted and dressed completely grey).

Tableaux were also performed for charity events. The February 1917 edition of the American magazine Harper's Bazar reported, with many photographs, on two events in London where society ladies posed, mostly as paintings. One event concentrated on paintings by James McNeill Whistler and John Singer Sargent, posed by ladies of American birth in London. The other included Violet Trefusis and Lady Diana Cooper.

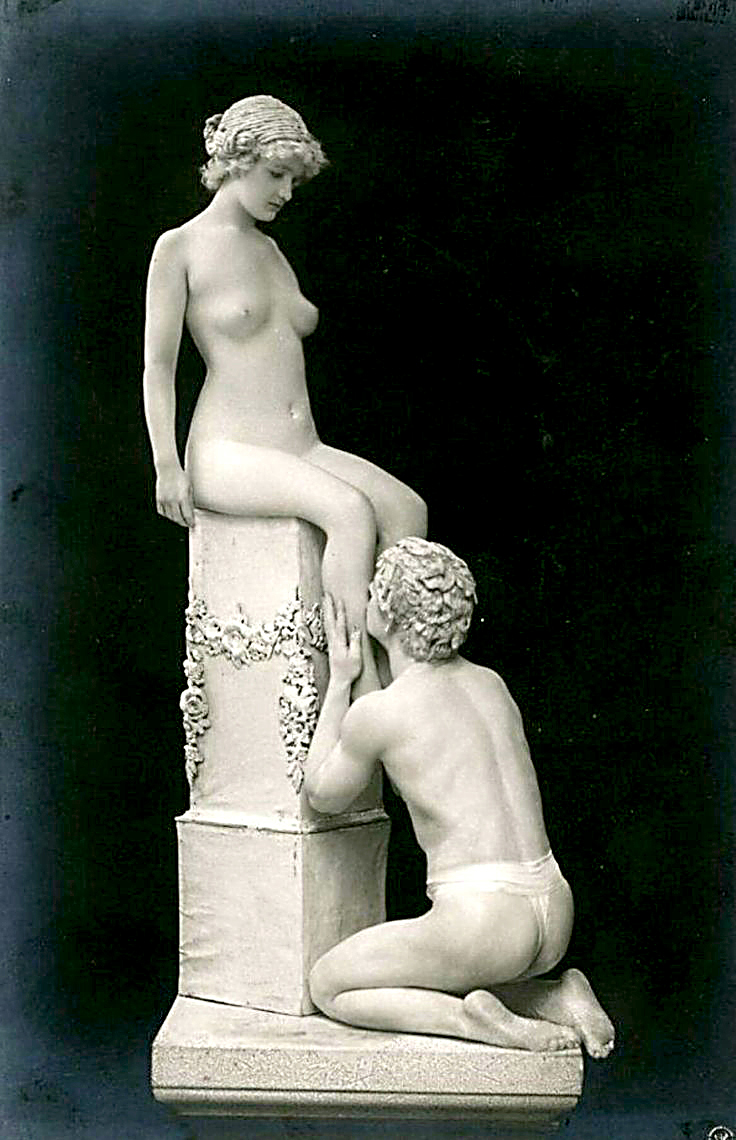
Tableau vivant featuring Olga Desmond and Adolf Salge, around 1908

By a quirk of English law, nudity on the stage was not permitted unless the performers remained motionless while the stage curtains were open; the situation in locations in the United States was often similar. In the early years of the 20th century, performers took advantage of this exception to stage "plastic representations", as they were sometimes called, centring on nudity. The most persistent performer in this line was the German dancer Olga Desmond, beginning in London, and who later put on Evenings of Beauty (Schönheitsabende) in Germany, in which she posed nude in imitation of actual or imagined classical works of art ("living pictures"). The English tradition in risqué entertainment continued until English law was changed in the 1960s.

In the nineteenth century, tableaux vivants took such titles as "Nymphs Bathing" and "Diana the Huntress" and were to be found at such places as the Hall of Rome in Great Windmill Street, London. Other venues were the Coal Hole in the Strand and the Cider Cellar in Maiden Lane. Nude and semi-nude poses plastiques were also a frequent feature of variety shows in the US: first on Broadway in New York City, then elsewhere in the country. The Ziegfeld Follies featured such tableaux from 1917. The Windmill Theatre in London (1932–1964) featured nude poses plastiques on stage; it was the first, and for many years the only, venue for them in 20th-century London.

Tableaux vivants were often included in fairground sideshows (as seen in the 1961 film A Taste of Honey). Such shows had largely died out by the 1970s, but continue in the Bridgewater Carnival in Somerset. Tableaux remain a major attraction at the annual Pageant of the Masters in Laguna Beach, California.

== tableaux in modern photographic theory ==
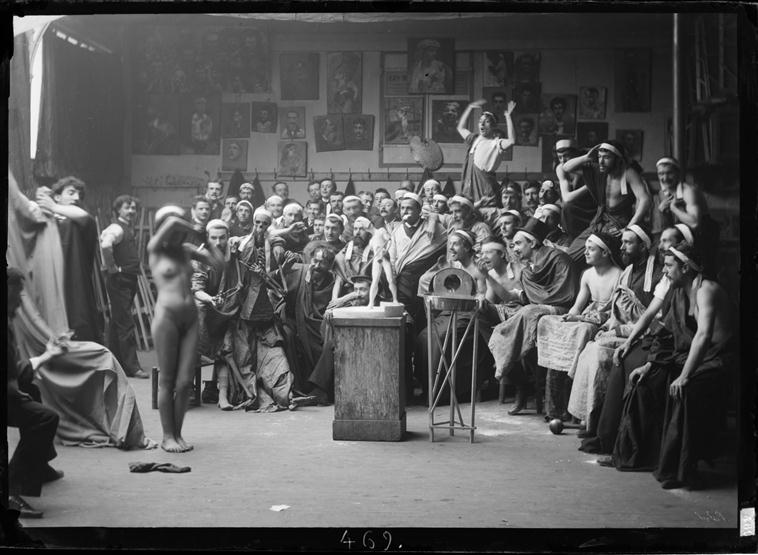
The students of the Paris art school Académie Julian recreate the famous painting Phryne before the Areopagus (1861) by Jean-Léon Gérôme, c. 1880

Jean-François Chevrier was the first to use the term tableau in relation to a form of art photography, which began in the 1970s and 1980s in an essay titled "The Adventures of the Picture Form in the History of Photography" in 1989. The initial translation of this text substitutes the English word picture for the French word tableau. However, Michael Fried retains the French term when referring to Chevrier's essay, because according to Fried (2008), there is no direct translation into English for tableau in this sense. While picture is similar, "... it lacks the connotations of constructedness, of being the product of an intellectual act that the French word carries." (p. 146) Other texts and Clement Greenberg's theory of medium specificity also cover this topic.

The key characteristics of the contemporary photographic tableau according to Chevrier are, firstly:

They are designed and produced for the wall. summoning a confrontational experience on the part of the spectator that sharply contrasts with the habitual processes of appropriation and projection whereby photographic images are normally received and "consumed" (p. 116)

By this, Chevrier notes that scale and size is obviously important if the pictures are to "hold the wall". But size has another function; it distances the viewer from the object, requiring one to stand back from the picture to take it all in. This "confrontational" experience, Fried notes, is actually quite a large break from the conventional reception of photography, which up to that point was often consumed in books or magazines.

The photographic tableau has its roots not in the theatrical tableau vivant, but in pictorialist photography, such as that of Alfred Stieglitz, a movement with its roots in Aestheticism, which already made heavy use of the tableau as a non-theatrical visual art style. Pictorialism, according to Jeff Wall could be seen as an attempt by photographers to imitate painting (perhaps unsuccessfully):

Pictorialist photography was dazzled by the spectacle of Western painting and attempted, to some extent, to imitate it in acts of pure composition. Lacking the means to make the surface of its pictures unpredictable and important, the first phase of Pictorialism, Stieglitz's phase, emulated the fine graphic arts, re-invented the beautiful look, set standards for gorgeousness of composition, and faded. (p. 75)

However photography did have the ability to become unpredictable and spontaneous. This was achieved by making photographs related to the inherent capabilities of the camera itself. And this, Wall argues, was a direct result of photojournalism, and the mass media and pop culture industries.

By divesting itself of the encumbrances and advantages inherited from older art forms, reportage, or the spontaneous fleeting aspect of the photographic image pushes toward a discovery of qualities apparently intrinsic to the medium, qualities that must necessarily distinguish the medium from others and through the self-examination of which it can emerge as a modernist art on a plane with others. (pp. 76–78)

The argument is that, unlike most other art forms, photography can profit from the capture of chance occurrences. Through this process—the snapshot, the "accidental" image—photography invents its own concept of the picture: a hybrid form of the "Western picture" (pictorialist photography) and the spontaneous snapshot. This is the stage whereby Wall argues that photography enters a "modernist dialectic". Wall states that unpredictability is key to modern aesthetics. This new concept of the picture, which Wall proposes, with the compositional aspects of the Western picture combined with the unpredictability that the camera affords through its shutter, can be seen in the work of many contemporary photographic artists, including Luc Delahaye, Andreas Gursky, Thomas Struth, Irene Caesar, and Philip-Lorca diCorcia.

The tableau as a form still dominates the art photography market. As Fried notes: "Arguably the most decisive development in the rise of the new art photography has been the emergence, starting in the late 1970s and gaining impetus in the 1980s and after, of what the French critic Jean-François Chevrier has called the "tableau form" (p. 143).

However, there appears to be only a handful of young, emerging artists working within the tableau form. Examples include Florian Maier Aichen, Matthew Porter and Peter Funch. More recently, Canadian artist Sylvia Grace Borda has worked since 2013 to continue to stage tableaux for the camera within the Google Street View engine. Her work creates 360° immersive tableau vivant images for the viewer to explore. Through her efforts to pioneer the tableaux vivant for online exploration, she and her collaborator, John M. Lynch, won the Lumen Prize 2016 for Web Arts.

== Film ==
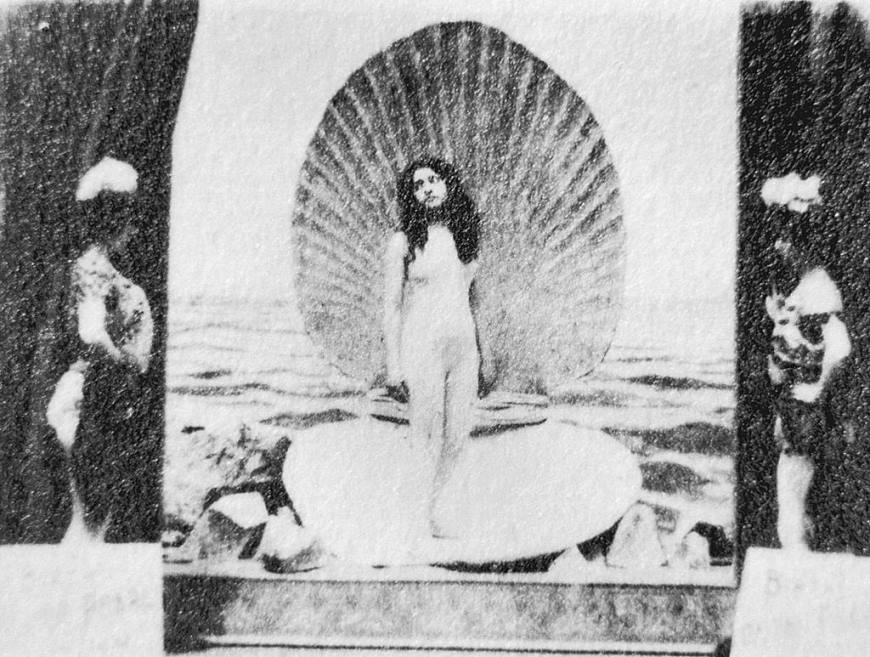
The 1901 film Birth of the Pearl by Frederick S. Armitage recreates a tableau vivant inspired in Botticelli's The Birth of Venus.

In Pier Paolo Pasolini's 1963 film La ricotta, a film maker tries to have actors depict two paintings, by Jacopo Pontormo and Rosso Fiorentino, of the Passion of Jesus.

The 1969 film The Color of Pomegranates, directed by Sergei Parajanov, presents a loose biography of the Armenian poet Sayat Nova in a series of tableaux vivants of Armenian costume, embroidery and religious rituals depicting scenes and verses from the poet's life.

Jean-Luc Godard's film Passion (1982) is about the making of an ambitious art film that uses re-creations of classical European paintings as tableaux vivants, set to classical European music. The paintings include Rembrandt's The Night Watch; Goya's The Parasol, Third of May 1808, La Maja Desnuda, Charles IV of Spain and His Family; Ingres' The Valpinçon Bather, The Turkish Bath; Delacroix's Entry of the Crusaders in Constantinople, Jacob wrestling with the Angel; El Greco's Assumption of the Virgin; Watteau's The Embarkation for Cythera.

Throughout Derek Jarman's film Caravaggio, many of Caravaggio's paintings are recreated in tableau vivant to explore their relationship to his life.

The 1991 film My Own Private Idaho presents its sex scenes using the effect.

In Edith Wharton's 1905 novel The House of Mirth and in the 2000 film by the same name, both set in the 1890s, protagonist socialite Lily Bart (Gillian Anderson) takes part in a tableau vivant.

The 2005 film Mrs Henderson Presents is based on a true story of the Windmill Theatre in London featuring tableaux vivants during the Second World War.

The 2013 film A Field in England makes use of the effect to add to the general occult look of the film.

There is a 2014 Estonian feature film produced entirely in tableau format titled In the Crosswind.

== See also ==
- Diorama
- Historical reenactment
- Living history
- Living statue
- Mannequin Challenge
- Oberammergau Passion Play. This passion play is played every ten years in Oberammergau, Germany. It includes several tableaux with scenes from the Old Testament.
