= Hermann Schieberth =

Austrian photographer

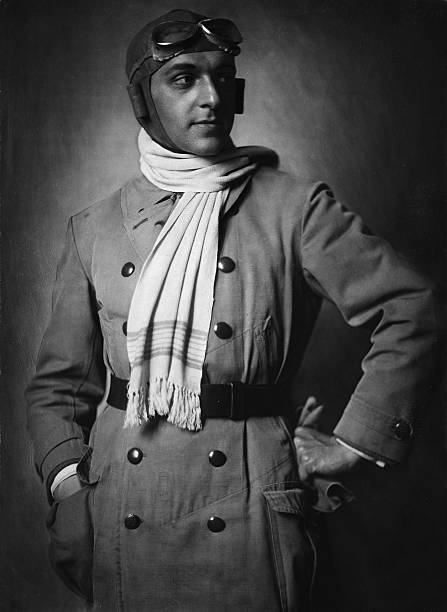
Karl Schenker in aviator outfit - 1919.

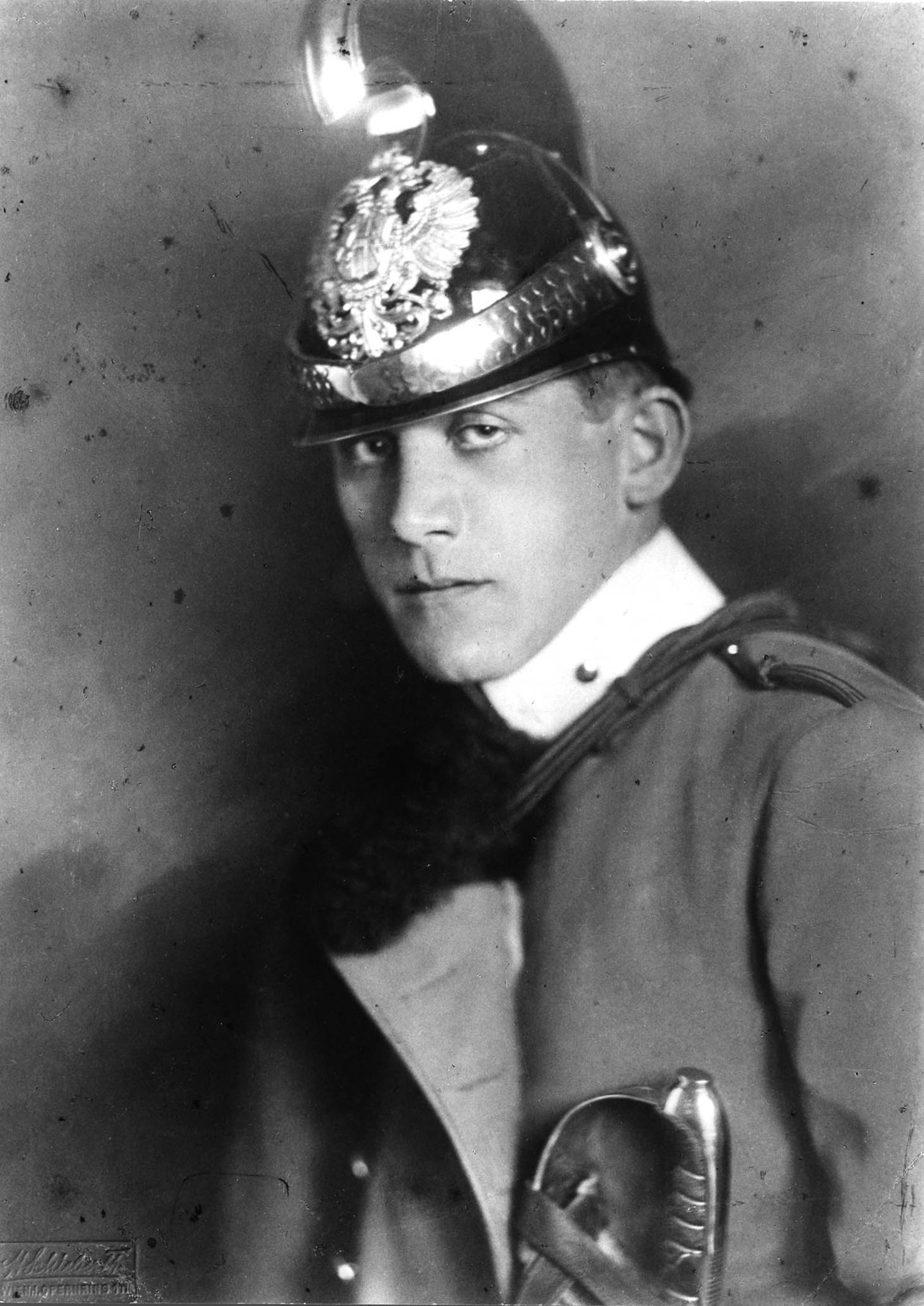
Oskar Kokoschka in Dragoon uniform

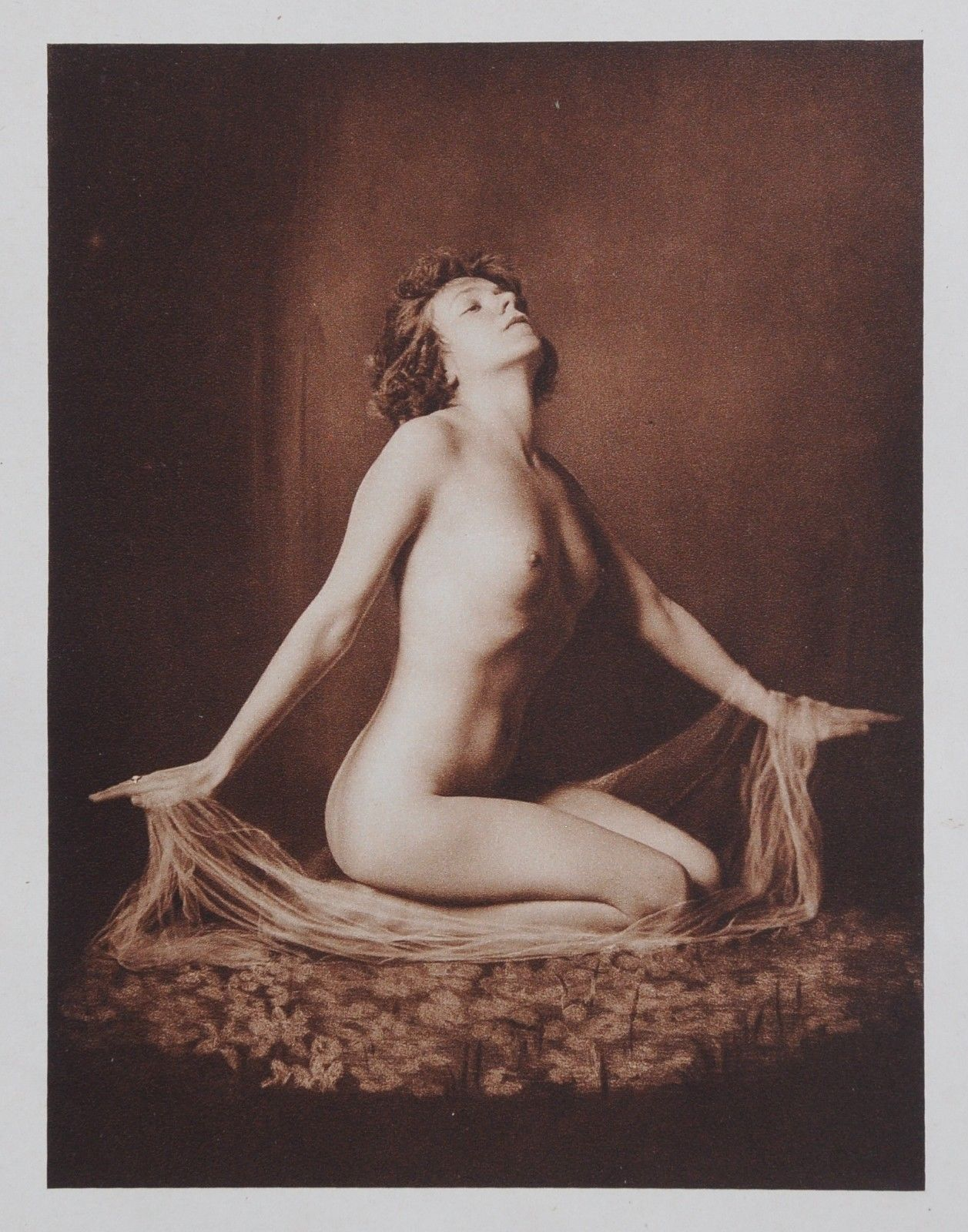
Akt

Hermann Schieberth was an Austrian photographer born on 12 February 1876 at Vama, Bukovina, Austria-Hungary (now in Romania) and died in Shanghai, China in 1948.

He had moved to Vienna in 1909 after having spent a period working in Zwittau (Svitavy).

== Career ==
He first attracted attention when he showed at the Kunstsalon Arnot in 1912.

He ran his studio was on the Opernring in Vienna from 1910 to 1937. In 1913, he opened a branch of his studio in Kaltenleutgeben, near Vienna. Trude Fleischmann worked as a photographer for Schieberth early in her career.

His works were primarily of other creatives (such as Oscar Kokoschka, Karl Kraus and Adolf Loos), politicians and aristocrats.

He also was known for his nudes which received wide circulation in portfolios, magazines and even as postcards.

In 1924, a pictorial report entitled Die Schönheit Dresdens (The Beauty of Dresden) was published by the Allgemeinen Photographischen Zeitung.

== Exile ==
With the arrival of the Nazi administration in Austria after the Anschluss, Schieberth, who was Jewish, emigrated to Shanghai where he is shown in the Shanghai telephone directory of 1947 as a professor, and located at 525 Hamilton House (one of the city's few skyscrapers at the time). In advertisements in the Shanghai Jewish Chronicle of the time he is shown as operating an art dealership at 267 Kiangse Road. He died in Shanghai in 1948.
