= Hedy Löffler =

Romanian photographer (1911–2007)

- Born: December 1911; Timișoara, Romania
- Died: December 2007 (aged 95–96); Israel
- Citizenship: Romanian
- Occupation: Photographer

Hedy Löffler (December 1911 – December 2007) was a Romanian photographer and founding member of the Association of Artist Photographers in Romania.

== Work and life ==
Löffler trained with Trude Fleischman. She produced photobooks depicting people and landscapes. To enable her work to be published, she had to include photographs of Nicolae Ceauşescu and his family and circle in some of her albums.

Löffler was a founding member of the Association of Artist Photographers in Romania (AAFR). She was on the steering committee and as head of exhibitions she decided which Romanian artist photographers were allowed to exhibit internationally.

== Awards and recognition ==
Löffler was awarded Honorary Fellowship of the International Federation of Photographic Art.
