= Olga Desmond =

Prussian-German dancer, actress, and art model (1890–1964)

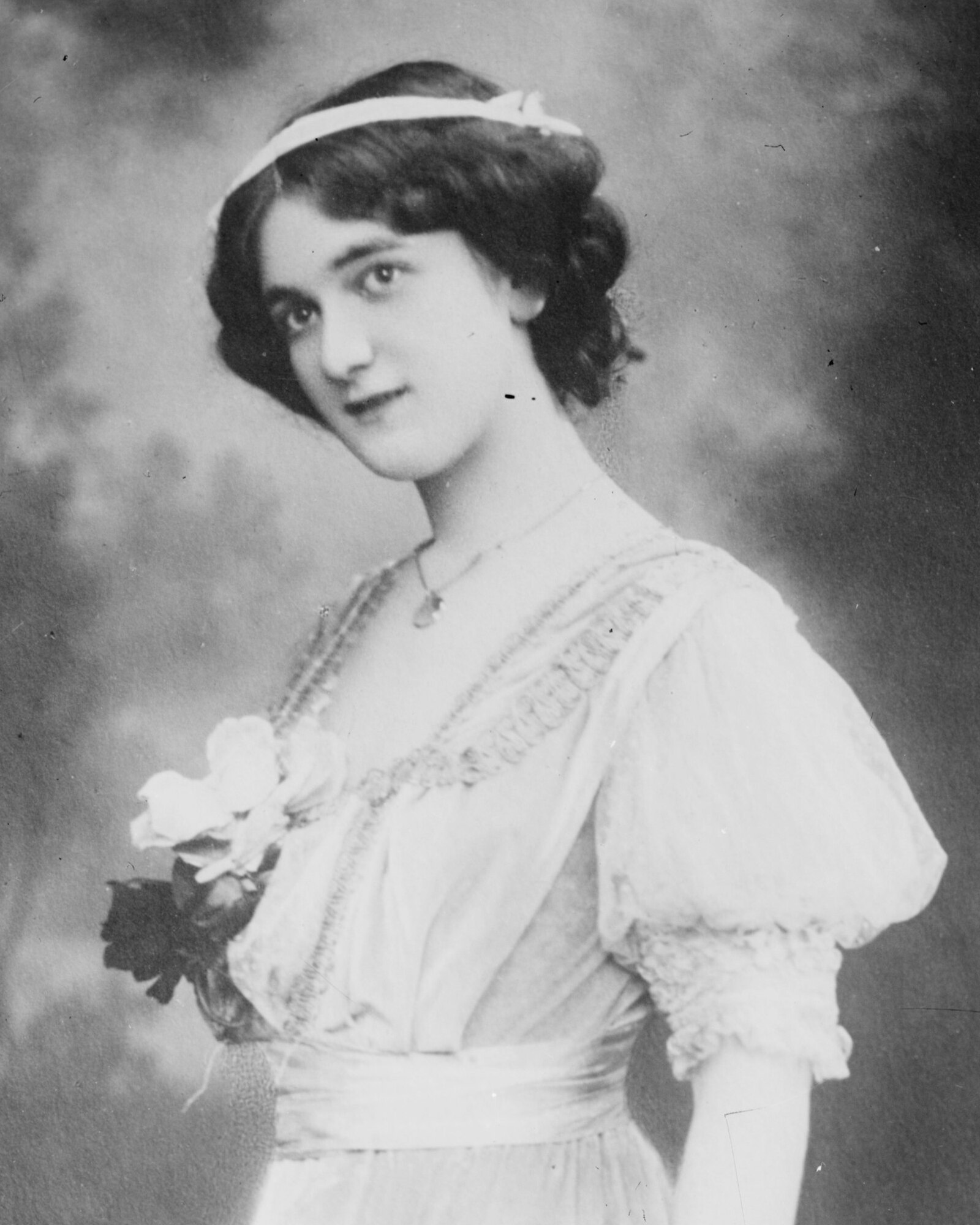
- Desmond c. 1900
- Born: Olga Antonie Sellin; 2 November 1890; Allenstein, East Prussia, German Empire
- Died: 2 August 1964 (aged 73); Berlin, East Germany
- Occupations: Dancer; actress; art model; living statue
- Years active: 1906–1922

Olga Desmond (born Olga Antonie Sellin; 2 November 1890 – 2 August 1964) was a German dancer, actress, art model and living statue.

== Biography ==
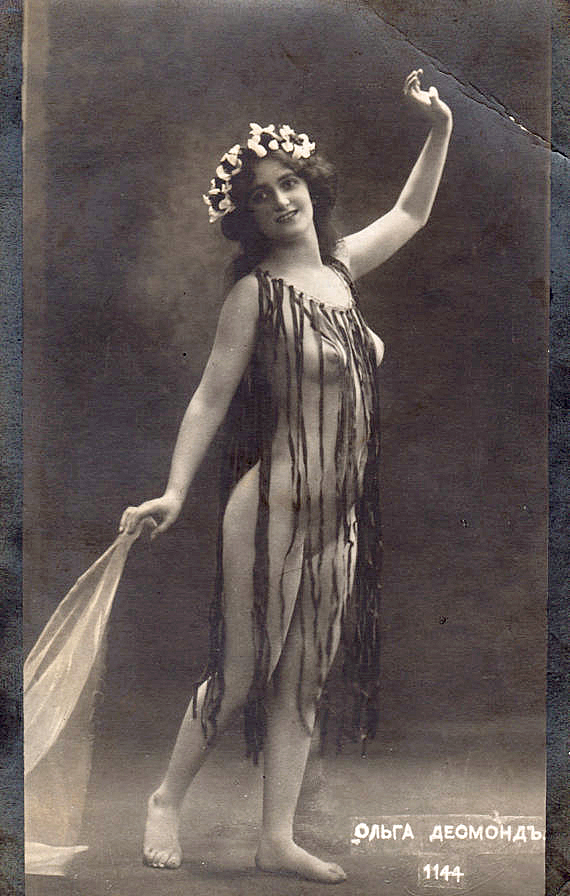
Olga Desmond c. 1910

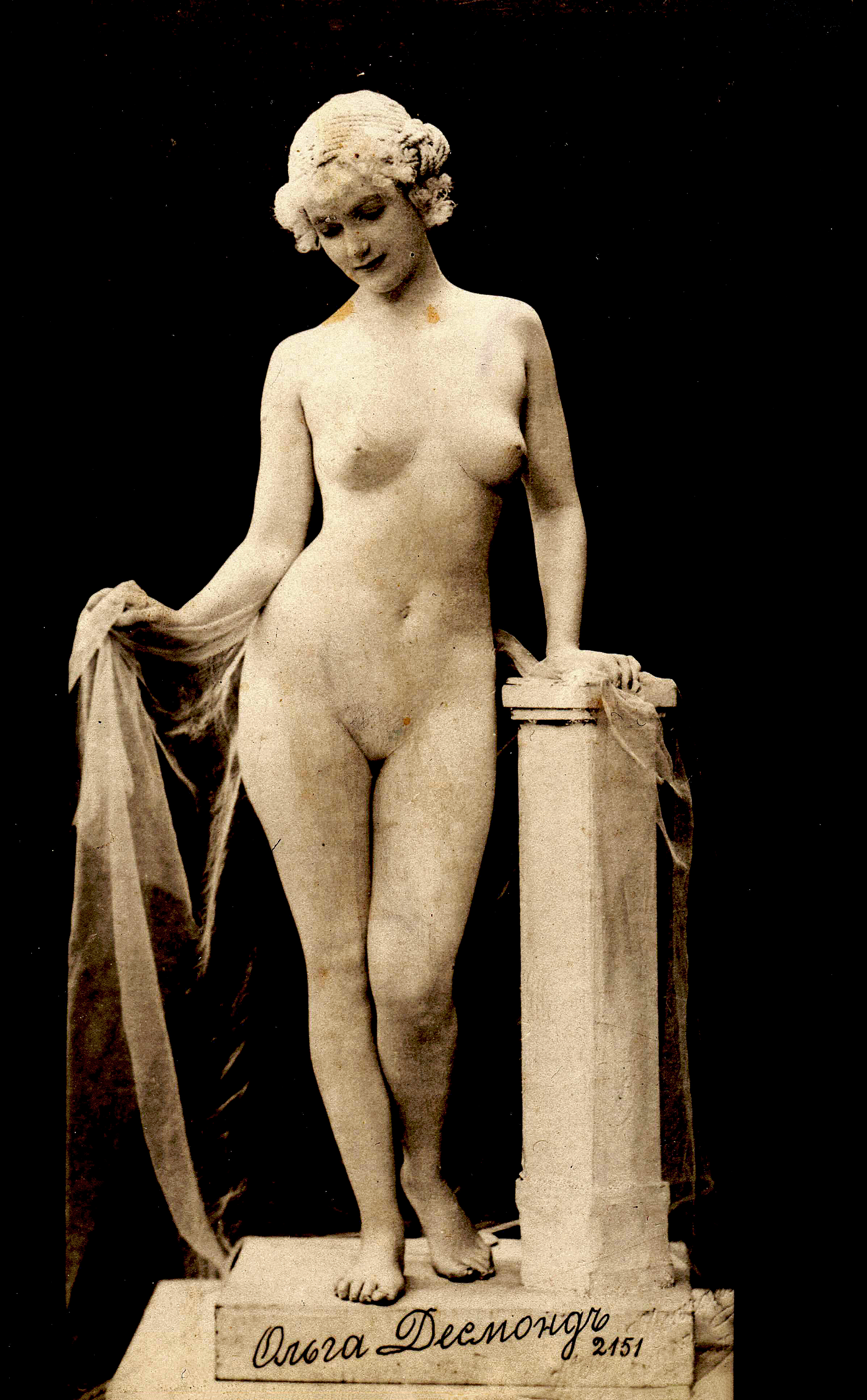
Olga Desmond on a contemporary Russian postcard

Olga Antonie Sellin was born on 2 November 1890 in Allenstein, East Prussia (now Olsztyn, Poland), and shared a home with thirteen brothers and sisters. At the age of fifteen, she left her family and joined a theatre act in London. In 1906, she attended the Marie Seebach School of the Königliches Schauspielhaus Berlin. In 1906/7, she joined a group of artists including Lovis Corinth and appeared as Venus during the group's nine-month tour at the London Pavilion where they put on "plastic representations." They were permitted to perform nearly nude provided they kept still, and used a curtain to hide them when they moved between scenes.

In Berlin, she co-founded the Association for Ideal Culture and gave shows called "living pictures" in which she posed after the manner of ancient classical works of art. Upon returning to Berlin, she changed her name to Olga Desmond, working with Adolf Salge. She began to create her own show, and would dance with a veil. Eventually she switched to a long mediaeval-style belt. The more she posed, the more she realized that she wanted to move on stage. She wanted to bring nudity to life. These so-called "Evenings of Beauty" (Schönheitsabende) were prohibited on more than one occasion starting from 1908, because the actors usually posed nude or wearing only bodypaint. She defended them by comparing them with the classical Greek ideal of nudity. Variety reported in 1909 that she had been ordered to cover up when performing at the Crystal Palace, Leipzig, where she was earning $200 per night, but the police in Frankfurt did not stop her performing there. She also introduced solo dances between the tableaux and a new performance piece, Der Schwertertanz [Sword Dance] performed between two upward pointed spearheads set on the stage floor. This led to invitations to appear around Germany and in St Petersburg.

=== Visit to Russia ===
The "heroine of living pictures", Olga Desmond became one of the first to promote nudity on the stage in St. Petersburg, Russia, when in the summer of 1908, the German dancer arrived there with her repertoire of performance. Olga Desmond's Evenings of Beauty quickly became the subject of a great debate in the Russian media. At least one of the representatives of official "justice" wanted to haul Desmond into court for "seduction".

Olga Desmond herself persistently defended her right to appear naked. She told the Russian press:

Call it daring or bold, or however you want to describe my appearance on the stage, but this requires art, and it (art) is my only deity, before whom I bow and for which I am prepared to make all possible sacrifices ... I decided to break the centuries-old heavy chains, created by people themselves. When I go out on stage completely naked, I am not ashamed, I am not embarrassed, because I come out before the public just as I am, loving all that is beautiful and graceful. There was never a case when my appearance before the public evoked any cynical observations or dirty ideas.

Like other dancers around the world seeking to raise the status of their art, Olga Desmond raised the prices of some of her shows so that only people who respected her kind of art would be seeing her shows. In addition to raising prices, many of her performances were only open to members of other dance societies so that people on the street could not see her performances.

Asked whether a stage costume would interfere with her, Olga Desmond answered: "To be completely graceful in a costume or even in a tricot is unthinkable. And I decided to throw off this needless yoke." Objecting to the claims that she excites "base instincts" of the public, the dancer said: "I purposely set a high admission charge for my shows so that the street would not get in, for it has little understanding of pure art, but so that people with broader demands for it would come, people who will look on me as a servitor of art."

The authorities in St. Petersburg paid little attention to the explanations offered by the dancer from Berlin, and her first appearance in the imperial Russian capital was also her last: further shows were forbidden by the mayor. Many artists in the capital took the side of the authorities. For example, Konstantin Makovsky sharply denounced what he called the "cult of the naked body", saying that "beauty, like much else in life, must have its hidden secrets, that we don't even have the right to expose."

=== Return to Berlin ===
Olga Desmond was no less the subject of controversy in her own country. In 1909, her appearance in the Berlin Wintergarten was the cause of such a scandal that it became a subject of discussion even in the Prussian State Assembly. But "scandalous" also meant well-known, and as a result of her renown, there were cosmetic products that carried her name. She traveled through Germany on numerous tours until 1914, when she married a Hungarian large landowner, and went off with him to his estate.

From 1916 through 1919, she appeared in various films including Seifenblasen (Soap Bubbles), Marias Sonntagsgewand (Maria's Sunday clothes) and Mut zur Sünde (Courage for sin). In the latter film, she played opposite the later well-known German actor Hans Albers. In 1917, she separated from her husband and returned to the stage. Her first appearance took place on 15 April 1917 at the Theatre of the Royal University (Theater der Königlichen Hochschule) in Berlin. In the same year, she appeared in a performance of Carmen in Cologne. She presented dance evenings and other things in Warsaw, Breslau (now Wrocław), and Kattowitz (now Katowice).

Desmond was an advocate for teaching as well. In 1919, she published a pamphlet, Rhythmograpik, which included a new method of writing down dances and transcribing the movements into special symbols. The pamphlet included images of her in see-through gowns and nude women dancing within floral patterning; Desmond understood the precision that went into dancing. Her pamphlet helped other female dancers in a new and interesting way. Thereafter, she made fewer public appearances and from 1922 devoted herself entirely to teaching. Among her best-known students was Hertha Feist, who later became a member of the dance group of Rudolf von Laban.

After the First World War, she married her second husband, Georg Piek, a Jewish businessman with a studio for stage equipment, decorations, and special fabrics. After 1933, Piek left Germany.

After World War II, Desmond lived in the eastern part of Berlin. In her later years, forgotten by the public, she worked as a cleaning woman. To make a living, she also sold vintage postcards and other memorabilia from her time as a renowned dancer.

On August 2, 1964, Olga Desmond died in Berlin, largely forgotten by the public. She was laid to rest at the I. St. Elisabeth Cemetery.

== Legacy ==
Desmond's work continues to be exhibited. For example, in 1993 a photo of her 1908 'Schönheitsabende' performance featured in Mike Kelley's The Uncanny. In 2009 she was the subject of Olga Desmond 1890–1964 Preußens Nackte Venus. She was included in Dance of Hands: Tilly Losch and Hedy Pfundmayr in Photographs 1920–1935 which ran at Museum des Moderne Salzburg in 2014 and at Das Verborgene Museum in 2015–2016. Otto Skowranek's series of photos of Desmond's sword dance is held at Deutsches Tanzarchiv Köln.

== Filmography ==
- 1915: Seifenblasen
- 1915: Nocturno
- 1917: Postkarten-Modell : Wanda
- 1917: Die Grille
- 1918: Leben um Leben : Aglaja
- 1918: Der Mut zur Sünde
- 1918: Der fliegende Holländer : Senta. Directed by Hans Neumann.
- 1919: Göttin, Dirne und Weib

== Publications ==
- Desmond, Olga. Rhythmographik. Tanznotenschrift als Grundlage zum Selbstudium des Tanzes. Edited by Fritz Böhme, Leipzig, 1919.

== See also ==
- Performance art

=== Performance artists in similar genre ===
- Carolee Schneemann
- Charlotte Moorman
- Gertrud Leistikow

=== Early photographers working with similar genre ===
- Trude Fleischmann
