= De Droomfabriek =

- Directed by: Netty van Hoorn
- Produced by: Netty van Hoorn
- Cinematography: Onno van der Wal
- Edited by: Hans Dunnewijk
- Production company: Netty van Hoorn Film/Video Produkties B.V.
- Release date: 2007
- Running time: 59 minutes
- Country: Netherlands

De Droomfabriek (The Dream Factory) is a 2007 Dutch documentary produced and directed by Netty van Hoorn about the students at the Havo voor Muziek en Dans (High School for Music and Dance) in Rotterdam, the Netherlands. It was broadcast by Nederlandse Programma Stichting on the TV program Het Uur van de Wolf (The Hour of the Wolf) on 3 June 2007.

== Plot ==
For forty years the Havo voor Muziek en Dans has given talented young people the opportunity to study music and dance in depth as well as following the normal high school curriculum, with the possibility of going on to the conservatory or dance academy. Each pupil dreams of becoming a professional dancer or musician. The children come from all over the country, and from all types of background. The film focuses on eight students: John, Lorenzo, Genelva, Paul, Misha, Alysh, Mickel and Rory.

The camera gives a view of the pupils' daily life in the school as the camera "dances" between classrooms and practice rooms. It shows the tension of the tough entrance exams and the demanding teachers. It shows the sacrifices the pupils have to make to realize their dreams, such as 12-year-old Alysh from distant Joure who has to live in lodgings while she studies at the school. The film also shows the adolescents coping with their parents and struggling with their ambitions, anxiety and love. The school is a factory where the dreams of ambitious and talented young people are nurtured.

== Production ==
To make the film, Netty van Hoorn and her cameraman Onno van der Wal repeatedly visited the school, which is located in the modern Codarts building in downtown Rotterdam, filming students in their daily lives over a ten-month period. The director said she invested a lot of time in getting the students used to her presence. If the cameraman was not present, she walked around with her own camera. She felt this helped ensure the camera was not disruptive, but gave a genuine view of life at the school. The film was edited by Annemiek van der Zanden.

== Reception ==
The film was screened at the 2007 Netherlands Film Festival in Utrecht. A reviewer said that the characters do not come to life, mainly because the camera does not follow any of them for long enough. He described the film as a missed opportunity.
