= Sylvia Grace Borda =

Canadian artist

- Born: Vancouver, British Columbia, Canada
- Education: University of British Columbia; Emily Carr University of Art and Design
- Known for: photography; video; stereography; drone capture; emergent technology; graphic user interface design; digital media; Google Street View; land art
- Awards: Mozilla Foundation: Rise 25 Award (2023), City of Vancouver Heritage Award (2023), Lumen Prize (2016), Creative Climate Commission, British Council (2021)
- Website: sylviagborda.com

Sylvia Grace Borda is a Canadian artist-urban geographer, working in photography, video, and emergent technologies. Borda has worked as a curator, lecturer, and multimedia framework architect, specializing in content arrangement (GUI) and production. Born and raised in Vancouver, Borda is based in Nanaimo, Canada and Scotland. Her work has been exhibited locally, nationally, and internationally.

== Artistic practice ==
Borda studied anthropology and fine art as an undergraduate at the University of British Columbia (1991–1996) and then a MFA in digital media at the same institution. She studied and graduated with a BFA in photography and video at the Emily Carr University of Art and Design (1993–95).

Borda achieved early recognition for her photographic practice. Her first exhibition was a national, juried photography exhibition entitled Photoperspectives '88, which ran during November 1988 at the Presentation House Gallery in West Vancouver. Elizabeth Godley praised Borda's work as "[leavening] an otherwise deadly serious exhibit with her cheerful view from Grandma's Window."

More recently, Borda has produced works as a part of Frontiers in Retreat that captures "intimate insights into Finland's agricultural resources and peoples". This is in line with her interests in "re-addressing public views about specific socio-cultural landscapes and how cultural symbols may be co-opted to form new media platforms", an interest which has generated an array of stereo-works and multi-dimensional tableaux produced in Google Streetview. The innovative Farm Tableaux won her the 2016 Lumen Prize, and was a product of the "first explorative artworks in Google Street View in partnership with Google Business StreetView photographer, John M Lynch". She has since gone onto pioneer further works in Google Street View creating tableaux featuring kissing couples in Nelson, BC, amateur athletes in 'What are you doing, Richmond?' (2019) to collaborating and producing the first interactive park system for the City of Dundee taken from the perspective of a small park mammal in "Internet of Nature' (2021) For presentation at the UN COP26 Climate Conference, she collaborated with youth and partners to create the world’s first earth community climate observation land artworks that are now supported by Earth Science and Remote Sensing (ESRS) group, ARES Division at Johnson Space Center NASA, and the International Space Station for global community agro-forestry learning and well-being. This project led to a special collaboration and invitation for an agro-forestry artwork to be planted at the National Botanic Gardens in Ethiopia using indigenous flora.

== Research and teaching ==
Borda has held teaching positions as Senior Photography Lecturer at University of Salford from January – September 2010, as MA Convenor in Photography and Imaging at Queen's University Belfast, Associate Professor in Digital Arts at Emily Carr University of the Art and Design and Associate Researcher in New Media at the University of British Columbia. From 2009–2016 Borda was an Honorary Research Fellow in Visual Arts at the University of Stirling, Scotland.

In her academic posts, Borda examined how "cognitive responses evolve over time in relation to a media stimuli" as part of her broader research interests in "examination of popular culture and in the emergence of convergent graphical user interface systems." At the same time, Borda conducted research on "accessibility standards, tools and the plausibility of their facilitation for projects supporting cultural collections". She has participated in research projects on PDA deployment and cultural/visual recognition, examined the Canadian Heritage Information Network's mobile technologies and new wireless (was) enabled catalogue, and was the architect behind EdWeb, an "educational on-line content generation tool, designed to meet England's National Curriculum needs for school children aged 8–13."

== Curatorial work ==
- Scripted Exhibition – curated by Borda, 2004
- Digital Visions – New media interviews 2004–05 – curated by Borda
- ESC – Electronic Social Culture, New Media artists in Canada – curated by Borda, Gu Xiong, Sadira Rodrugues, Centre A, Vancouver, BC, 2002

== Books and publications ==
- Borda, Sylvia Grace, Vancouver Fruit Tree Project & Coast Salish Plant Nursery. (2022). Vancouver Fruit Tree Histories and Communities. Vancouver Fruit Tree Project.
- Borda, Sylvia Grace., & Strom, Jordan. (Eds.) (2020). Sylvia Grace Borda: Shifting Perspectives. Heritage House Press.
- Borda, Sylvia Grace (2018) "LOCATING THE CAMERA IN A DIGITAL TIME," photographies, 11:2-3, 177-192, DOI: 10.1080/17540763.2018.1445014
- Borda, Sylvia Grace (January 1, 2009). "[20 Modernist Structures in NI I Love]". Building Material (19): 82–85. JSTOR 29792383.
- Borda, Sylvia Grace (2006) EK modernism: celebrating Scotland's first New Town

== Solo exhibitions ==
- Artist in residence Program exhibition Darts Hill Gardens, British Columbia, Canada. Programme curated by Susan Murray (November 1–22, 2021)
- What are you doing, Richmond? Permanent arts installation for Centre for Active Living, Richmond, BC, Canada Curated by Biliana Velkova, Elisa Yon; City of Richmond Public Art programme
- Through the Lens , Arbutus Gallery, Kwantlen Polytechnic University, Canada Curated by Professor Maria Anna Parolin (January 15 – February 11, 2019)
- Kissing Project, Oxygen Arts Centre, British Columbia, Canada (June 6 – July 8, 2017).
- Murals, Serde Arts Centre, Aizpute, Latvia (2017)
- The Lumsden Biscuit, Scottish Sculpture Workshop, Scotland (2016) Curated by Nuno Sacramento.
- Revisiting a Holiday in Glenrothes, The Lighthouse, Scotland's Centre for Architecture and Design. (March 28 – May 8, 2015) Produced by the Scottish Civic Trust.
- Camera Histories, Street Level Photoworks, Glasgow, Scotland. (November 22, 2013 – February 2, 2014) Curated by Malcolm Dickson.
- Aerial Fields, Surrey Urban Screen, British Columbia. (September 8, 2013 – January 6, 2014) Curated by Liane Davison and Alison Rajah.
- Beyond Sight: Interrogations of a Camera, A&D Gallery, London, UK. (2009–2010) Curated by Karen Downey
- Cameras and Watercolour sunsets, CSA Space, Vancouver, Canada. Curated by Christopher Brayshaw and Steven Tong.
- A Holiday in Glenrothes, Royal Institute of Architect's Scotland Gallery, Edinburgh, Scotland (2008).
- Traveling to Glenrothes, Rothes Hall Galleries, Fife, Scotland (2008) Curated by Andy Neil.
- EK Modernism, CSA Space, Vancouver, Canada. (2007) Curated by Adam Harrison.
- EK Modernism: New Town Passages, EKAC Galleries, East Kilbride, Scotland. (2006)
- New works, East Kilbride Arts Centre, Scotland (2005) Curated by J.Keith Donnelly.
- Minimalist Portraits, Net Art Launch, SAW Art Gallery, Ottawa, Ontario (2004) Curated by Jason St Laurent.
- Every Bus Stop in Surrey, BC, Surrey Art Gallery, Surrey, British Columbia. (2002) Curated by Liane Davison.
- Capital Cities, Centre A, Vancouver, British Columbia. (2002) Curated by Alice Ming Wai Jim.
- In Transit, Pocket Gallery, Vancouver, British Columbia (1999) Curated by Jeremy Turner.
- Of Myth and Muse, Richmond Art Gallery, Richmond, British Columbia, (1996) Curated by Paige Hope-Smith.

== Group exhibitions ==
- Nauru Climate National Pavilion, 61st Venice Biennale, Italy. Curated by Khaled Ramadan (May 6 - November 22, 2026)
- Making Space: Photographs of Architecture National Gallery of Scotland, Edinburgh, UK. Curated by Louise Pearson (October 7, 2023 – March 3, 2024)
- Crisis Gaia, C3 Complexity Science Center, Circuito Centro Cultural, Cd. Universitaria, Coyoacán, Mexico City, Mexico. Curated by Manolo Cocho (December 2023 – February 2024)
- Earth Photo: People, Place, Nature, Changing Forests in a Time of Climate Change – Shortlisted Winners Curated by Royal Geographical Society, Forestry England, Harris Parker. Venues: Royal Geographical Society Headquarters and Exhibition Hall, London, UK (June 17 – August 26, 2022); The Great Exhibition Road Festival, Royal Geographical Society Pavilion, London, UK (June 18–19, 2022); Fineshade Wood, Top Lodge, Fineshade, Northamptonshire, UK (November 1, 2022 – March 27, 2023)
- Select contributor to Jennifer and Kevin McCoy’s NFT project, Feral File, CHAIN REACTION Ethereum Platform, New York, USA Curated by Christiane Paul (March 8, 2023)
- Terra in Transformazione, Magazzino 26, Porto Vecchio, Trieste, Italy, Curated by Maria Campitelli and Manolo Cocho, (September 2–24, 2022)
- Tree Circle: Performing for Flora, Trees for Life presentation at PERA+FLORA+FAUNA Pavilion, Venice Biennale, Curated and organized by Khaled Ramadan (April 21, 2022)
- Tree Circle: permanent outdoor earth observation artwork, Gullele National Botanic Gardens of Ethiopia , Curated by Nura Beshir, Women4Climate and Guelle National Botanic Gardens, Addis, Ethiopia (November 2022)
- Lumen Prize Exhibition: Shortlisted Projects, Barbican Arts Centre, London, UK, Curator Futures Prize: Christiane Paul and Lumen Prize Committee, (October 19, 2022)
- Trees for Life Project, COP26 Creative Climate Commission exhibitions, Curated by Rosanna Lewis for COP26, Blue Zone, British Council Pavilion, UN Meetings (October 30 – November 7); Curated by Rosanna Lewis, Celia Barron, British Council & City of London Corporation for Climate London. Venues: Paternoster Square, St Paul’s Cathedral, London (November 1–11, 2021); Aldgate Square, Aldgate High St, London (November 12–29, 2021); Guildhall Yard, Gresham Street (November 30 – December, 2021)
- Earth observation climate artworks, Kofele, West Arsi District, Oromia, Ethiopia. Permanent public artworks launched at Gofingira Gurmicho (October 26, 2021), Usula Moke (December 30). Curated by Hussein Watta, Rural Organization for the Betterment of Agropastoralists, Ethiopia
- Where we have been, 45th Anniversary Exhibition, Surrey Art Gallery , Surrey Art Gallery, BC, Canada. Curated by Rhys Edwards (September 19 – December 13, 2020)
- Contributor to John Max’s “Open Passport” folio as experimental audio composition: To Discard All Images, 32 min. Commissioned by ArrayMusic, Canada. Performed at Array Space, Toronto (February 8, 2019).
- The Enduring Town Art of Glenrothes , Rothes Halls, St Andrew’s University, Scotland. Curated by Andrew Demetrius (October 20 – November 22, 2018)
- 10 from the North | 10 bho Tuath: Patricia Macdonald, Sophie Gerrard, Karen Vaughan, Margaret Mitchell, Sylvia Grace Borda, Miriam Chefrad, Kotryna Ula Kiliulyte. Sigga Ella, Andrea Gjestvang, Iiu Susiraja An Lanntair Exhibition Centre, Outer Hebrides, Scotland, Curated by Katherine Parhar, Alex Boyd (2018)
- Home/Shelter/Belonging: Sylvia Grace Borda, Jim Breukelman, Germaine Koh, Hani Al Moulia, Annie Pootoogook, Itee Pootoogook, Gu Xiong, Exhibition curated by Robin Laurence and Darrin Morrison, West Vancouver Museum: Art, Design + Architecture, BC (July 19 – September 9, 2017)
- Edge Effects II, Frontiers in Retreat (Lumsden Biscuit presentation), Centre for Contemporary Art, Glasgow, Scotland, Guest Curated by Yvonne Billmore, SSW (July 28–31, 2017)
- Sites of Assembly, the Morris and Helen Belkin Art Gallery, Vancouver, British Columbia. (June 23 – August 13, 2017)
- Napier University, Edinburgh, Scotland (2017)
- Glasgow Women's Library Group exhibition, Scotland (2017)
- Summer Exhibition, Mustarinda, Finland (June 16- August 8, 2017)
- Lumen Prize Digital Arts Tour 2017: Canary Wharf Winter Festival, London, England; FQ Projects, Shanghai, China; Leeds Digital Art Festival, UK; New York City's Creative Tech week, USA
- Lumen Prize, Digital Arts Tour 2016: Hackney House, London, England; Cardiff Technology Centre, United Kingdom; Berlin Electronic Visualisation Conference, Germany; Caerphilly Castle, Wales (2016)
- Man-Made Art, A+D Gallery, London, England (Jan 11 – February 22, 2016)
- Summer show, Photographs and prints. A&D Gallery, London, United Kingdom. Guest curated by Maika (July 16 – August 30, 2015)
- Mantta Summer Exhibition: a new present || uusi nykyisyys. (June 13 – August 31, 2015) Curated by Kalle Hamm & Dzamil Kamanger.
- A Sense of Place, Oulu Art Museum, Finland (January 23 – March 15, 2015) Curated by Helka Ketonen.
- Cultural Productions, SERDE Residency, Latvia (September 2015)
- Views from the Southbank: Information, Objects, Mapping, Surrey Art Gallery, British Columbia (September 19 – December 13, 2015) Curator: Jordan Strom.
- Residency: Frontiers in Retreat workshop, Helsinki International Artist Programme, Finland (2014). Curated by Jenni Nurmenniemi & Nuno Sacramento.
- Digital Cultures, Museum of Finnish Photography, Helsinki, Finland (2014)
- "Figuring Ground: Sylvia Grace Borda and Jeremy Herndl," Surrey Art Gallery, British Columbia (September 21 – December 15, 2013) Curated by Jordan Strom.
- NORTHERN IRELAND: 30 Years of Photography, Belfast Exposed Gallery and the MAC, (May 10 – July 7, 2013) Curated by Karen Downey, Catalog by Colin Graham.
- Blueprint, Street Level Photoworks, Glasgow, Scotland. (February 2 – March 31, 2013)
- Beyond Vague Terrain: The City and The Serial Image, Surrey Art Gallery, Canada. Curated by Jordan Strom (2012)
- Zoo Art Sculptural Biennale, Cueno, Italy (2012)
- Seeing and Being in the Landscape, Blue Wall Gallery, Ireland Curated by Joe Keenan (2011)
- Scoping Worlds, Leitrim Sculpture Centre, Ireland. (2010) Curated by Sean O'Reilly.
- Glocal, Cultural Capital of Canada Artist Project, Tech Lab, Surrey Art Gallery (2009–2010)
- '(Not) A Photograph' Exhibition Obalne Galerije, Piran, Slovenia. (2008) Curated by Vasja Nagy.
- re-COLLECT-ing, Naughton Gallery, Belfast, Northern Ireland (2008)
- Subversive Cartography, National web launch – Virtual Net Art, Gallery TPW, Toronto, Ontario. (2007) Curated by Michael Alstad and Daniel Young.
- Proun series, HZ Net Gallery. (2007) Curated by Sachiko Hayashi.
- Two Chicken Noodle, Barcode Series, Digital Fringe, Melbourne (2007)
- National web launch – Virtual Net Art, Gallery TPW, Toronto, Ontario. (2007) Curated by Michael Alstad and Daniel Young
- Node.London'06, Media Arts Festival and exhibition (2007)
- Pixelware, Travelling exhibition: Dazibao Gallery, Montreal and Photographer's Gallery, Toronto (2005) Pixelware, a sublime forgery is a collaborative project curated by Dazibao, France Choinière and Marisa Portolese, and Gallery 44, Sara Angelucci and Elaine Whittaker.
- Ruins and Civilization: Stan Douglas, Antonia Hirsch, Sylvia Grace Borda, International art exhibition, Eslite Vision Art Space, Taipei, Taiwan. (August 7–29, 2004) Curated by Amy Cheng.

== Permanent collections ==
- Morris and Helen Belkin Art Gallery, University of British Columbia, Vancouver, Canada
- National Galleries Scotland
- St Andrews University, Scotland
- Surrey Art Gallery
- Ulster Museum, Belfast, Northern Ireland
- Vancouver Art Gallery

== Public art ==
Borda has delivered several public art projects in the last decade from digital to land artworks. In a collaboration (2020–2022) with partners, she developed a series of climate earth observation artworks in Ethiopia for presentation at COP26. This project was featured as a BBC Earth Instagram story, May 22, 2022 The project also garnered support from Johnston Space Centre, Earth Science and Remote Sensing team.

As part of Borda's interests in climate change she was co-commissioned by the City of Dundee to co-produce 'Internet of Nature (2021),' a portal of every civic park, seen from the perspective of urban park animals.

Portraying flora and fauna has also led to civic commissions to aid in economic regeneration and support for rural towns including the development of the, Lumsden Biscuit (2017) in Aberdeenshire, Scotland and a mural park system (2016–17) for Aizpute, Latvia.

In 2011, Borda created Working River, a landscape photomural which was installed at Number 4 Pump Station on the corner of No.4 Road and Bridgeport street. This work was commissioned by the City of Richmond Public Art Program. It was also part of a submission that won an Award of Excellence Project of the Year from BC Public Works Association.

== Residencies ==
- Darts Hill Gardens, Canada, April – October 2021.
- Inaugural Artist in Residence, Public Art Program, Minoru Centre for Active Living, City of Richmond, BC, Canada May 2018 – May 2019.
- Kwantlen Polytechnic University, Surrey, BC, Canada January 6, 2018 – January 29, 2019.
- Mustarinda Art Centre, Finland, April 5 – May 1, 2016.
- Helsinki International Artists Program, March 28, 2016 – April 3, 2016.
- Scottish Sculpture Workshop, February 20 – March 15, 2016.
- Helsinki International Artists Program, January 1, 2014 – December 31, 2015.
- Peace III, Cavan Arts, County Cavan, Ireland, May 2009 – February 2011.
- Taipei Artist Village, Taiwan, August 5–30, 2004.

== Public grants and awards ==
- City of Vancouver, Heritage Award in Education and Awareness (2023)
- Futures Prize Award Finalist, Lumen Prize (2022)
- Creative Climate Commission, British Council (2021)
- Frontiers in Retreat, EU Visual Arts and Innovation (2014–17)
- Lumen Prize Web Based Award (2016)
- BC Innovation and Media Grant (2011–12)
- Creative Communities Grant, Province of British Columbia, Canada.
- Surrey Art Gallery Urban Screen Production Grant.
- City of Richmond Public Art Commission: No.4 Pump Station (2010–11).
- Cultural Capital of Canada Artist status award in combination with Cultural Olympiad project status for the Vancouver Winter Olympics (2008–10)
- Innovation Award, The Lighthouse Gallery Glasgow (2006)
- Urban Culture Award (through the Millennium Commission, Cities of Culture Liverpool) for 2005–07.

== Further listening ==
- "National Galleries Scotland, Making Space: Scottish New Town Design and Climate Change – Sylvia Grace Borda," October 5, 2023. Edinburgh, Scotland, 2023.
- "Street Level Photoworks, Close-up: Sylvia Grace Borda in conversation with Christiane Monarchi," March 5, 2021. Glasgow, Scotland, 2021.
- "Recasting Modernism – Scotland and Venice Architecture Biennale Roundtable," Glasgow, Scotland, March 17, 2015.
- "Sylvia Grace Borda talking about the development of the 'Kissing Project'," with Kootenay Co-op Radio, Nelson, BC, 2017.
- "Sylvia Grace Borda talking about the creation of Farm Tableaux in Canada and Finland," Helsinki, Finland, 2015.
- "Recasting Modernism – Scotland and Venice Architecture Biennale Roundtable," Glasgow, Scotland, March 17, 2015.
- "Sylvia Grace Borda talking about the photography activity ' Take a Holiday In Your Own Back Yard'," 2014, with the Scottish Civic Trust.
- "Q+A between Christiane Monarchi of PhotoMonitor Magazine and Sylvia Grace Borda," November 24, 2013 at Street Level Photoworks, Glasgow, Scotland.
- "Agency of Light: A history of the photogram – an artist discussion," April 5, 2013, at Street Level Photoworks, Glasgow, Scotland.
- "Seeing across boundaries and borders – artist discussion about her residency work in Ireland," May 2010, with CavanArts.
