= Gertrud Leistikow =

German dancer and choreographer

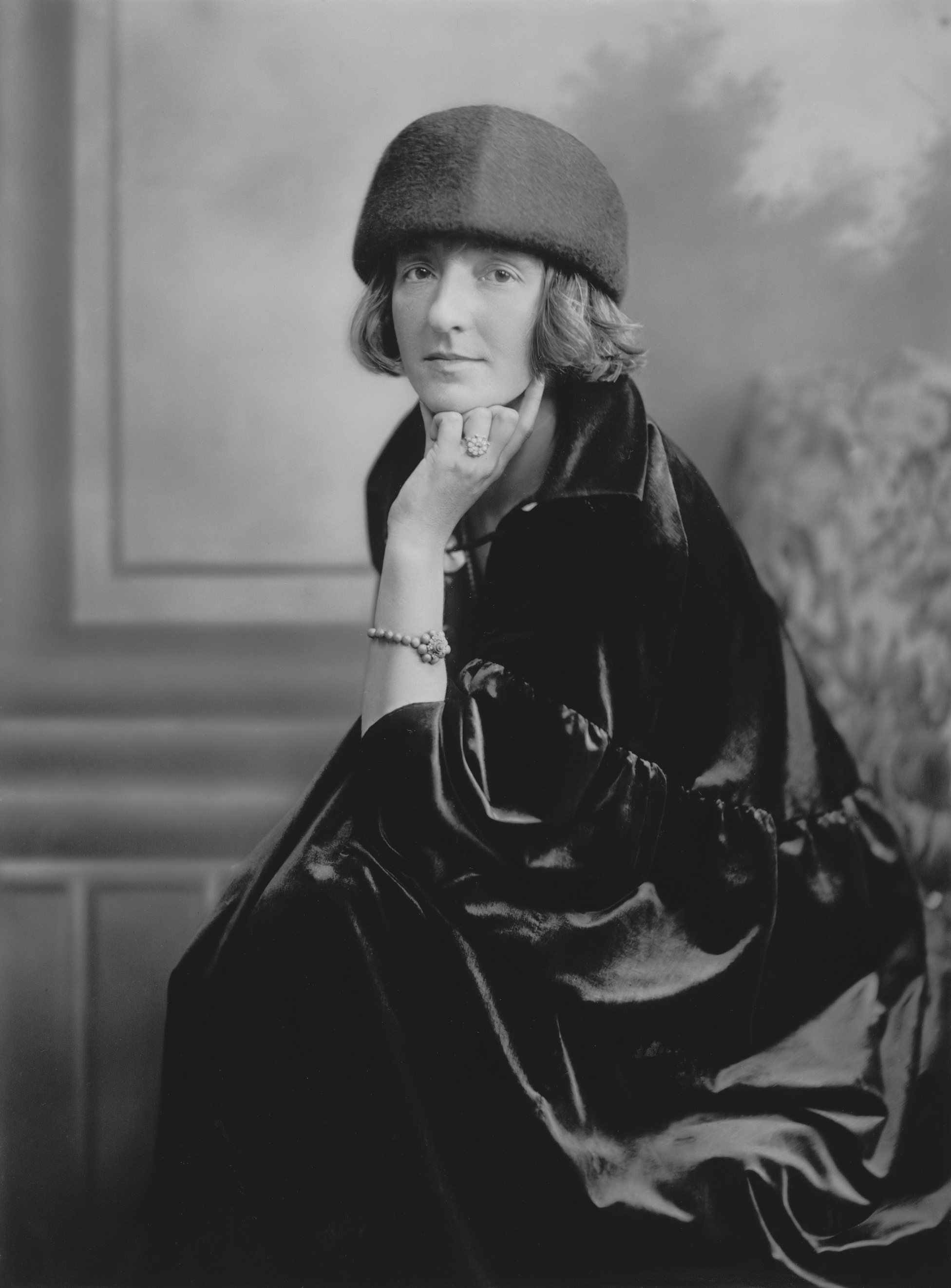
- Born: 21 September 1885; Bückeburg
- Died: 23 November 1948 (aged 63)
- Occupation: Dancer, costume designer

Gertrud Leistikow (21 September 1885 – 9 November 1948) was a German dancer and choreographer. She is primarily associated with nude and Grotesque dance.

== Life and work ==
Gertrud Leistikow was born on 21 September 1885 in Bückeburg, Lower Saxony. She attended girls' schools in Metz and Spa, and studied graphic design and painting in the class of Max Frey at the Academy of Applied Arts in Dresden, where in 1904 she experienced a performance of Émile Jaques-Dalcroze. She learned the basics of the Delsarte system from Hedwig Kallmeyer in Berlin. Leistikow began to dance between 1906 and 1910. She was rarely photographed but drawings by Dora Brandenburg-Polster in 1911 show her as a nude dancer. In 1914 Leistikow's solo performances already drew considerable crowds in St. Petersburg, Moscow, Lausanne, Utrecht and Sarajevo. In the summer of 1914 Leistikow joined Rudolf von Laban's troupe in Ascona, where in addition to Mary Wigman she had a major role in Laban's dance drama "triumph of the victim" by Hans Brandenburg. In 1916 she starred in a tour through Germany and the Netherlands.

Gertrud Leistikow performing in a meadow near Ascona, 1914

After her marriage to a Dutch flower dealer, she rarely left Holland. Leistikow directed three dance schools in Amsterdam, The Hague and Rotterdam. A trip to the Dutch East India caused them to open three more schools in 1924. In 1931 she set up the Rotterdam School of Dance with the Dutch dancer and teacher Corrie Hartong, who was 21 years younger. The two disagreed over objectives, and after three years Leistikow left. She gave farewell tours through the Netherlands in the years 1929, 1930 and 1937. Nevertheless, she again toured from 1938 to 1939 in the Dutch East Indies. At the outbreak of the Second World War, Leistikow returned to the Netherlands and opened another dance school. She distanced herself from the Nazi-friendly Dutch dance culture of the time.

Gertrud Leistikow kept her face expressionless, and often hid it behind scarves, veils and masks to draw the attention of the viewer to the rest of her body. Drawings and rare photographs often show Leistikow naked, but with her face covered. A dance photo of Leistikow on gelatin silver chloride made in 1912 by the photographer Hugo Erfurth has been exhibited since 1982 at the Folkwang Museum. Leistikow died on 23 November 1948.

== See also ==
- Olga Desmond
- Trude Fleischmann
