= Corrie Hartong =

Dutch dancer, dance teacher and choreographer

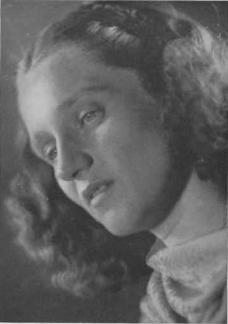
- Born: Hendrina Cornelia Hartong; 23 February 1906; Rotterdam
- Died: August 9, 1991 (aged 85); Rotterdam
- Occupation: Choreographer

Hendrina Cornelia (Corrie) Hartong (23 February 1906 – 9 August 1991) was a dancer, dance teacher and choreographer in the Netherlands.

== Biography ==
Hendrina Cornelia Hartong was born in Rotterdam on 23 February 1906. She studied modern dance with Mary Wigman in Dresden. Mary Wigman's Ausdruckstanz expressionist modern dance style inspired Corrie Hartong and others to start their own dance schools and to develop performances themselves. Between 1928 and 1931 she taught in Chemnitz and Magdeburg. She then returned to Rotterdam to teach.

In 1931 Hartong set up the Rotterdam School of Dance (Note: Rotterdamse Dansschool, renamed the Rotterdamse Dansacademie (Rotterdam Dance Academy) from 1954. In 1986 it became part of the Hogeschool voor Muziek en Theater Rotterdam (Rotterdam School of Music and Theatre).) along with the German dancer and teacher Gertrud Leistikow, who was 21 years older. The two disagreed over objectives, and after three years Leistikow left. In 1935 the dance school became part of the Rotterdam Conservatory under Willem Pijper, with Hartong as director. She was to remain in this position until 1967. She initiated creation of the dance library to the Amsterdam Theater Instituut Nederland.

World War II broke out in 1939 and the Netherlands were invaded in May 1940. On 14 May 1940 the buildings of the dance school and the main building of the conservatory were destroyed by bombs, and it was decided to merge the two conservatories in one building on the Mathenesserlaan, where the music school had a branch. Soon they moved again to a big old house that had somehow been spared, totally surrounded by rubble, and managed to continue day classes and early evening classes before curfew throughout the remainder of the war. After the war ended in 1945 she held several administrative positions. In 1946 she was co-founder of the Dutch Association of Dance Artists, and for seven years was chairman.

Corrie Hartong died in Rotterdam on 9 August 1991 at the age of 86.

== Legacy ==
The Corrie Hartong Fonds is named in her memory. The fund awards an annual scholarship to exceptionally talented students at Codarts. Two former students of the Havo voor Muziek en Dans, a secondary school co-located with Codarts with a special focus on music and dance, received a Corrie Hartong scholarship for the 2011-2012 academic year. Joris Bergmans was funded for an internship at Introdans in Arnhem and Christopher Renfurm for a stint at Alvin Ailey American Dance Theater in New York City.

== Bibliography ==
- Corrie Hartong (1982). Over dans gesproken. Donker. p. 112. ISBN 9061002044.
- Corrie Hartong; Dorle Hoffmann (1984). Danse Sacrée, Danse Profane: Muziek: Claude Debussy. Choreografie: Corrie Hartong. Kinetografie: Dorle Hoffmann, Met Medewerking Van M. Leentvaar, T. Adams. p. 76.
- Corrie Hartong (1985). Danskunst: inleiding tot het wezen en de practijk van de dans. Nederlands Instituut voor de Dans. p. 182.
