= Hertha Feist =

German expressionist dancer (1896–1990)

Hertha Feist Laban Schule in 1923 in the Berlin Stadium

Hertha Feist (1896–1990) was a German expressionist dancer and choreographer. She established her own school in Berlin, combining gymnastics with nudism and dance. In the 1930s, her ambitions were seriously curtailed by the Nazis.

== Biography ==
Born in Berlin, Feist first studied with Émile Jaques-Dalcroze in Hellerau, Dresden, in 1914 before moving back to Berlin in 1917 to study under Olga Desmond. Thereafter she joined Rudolf von Laban, following him to various locations in the north of Germany and participating in his majestic Tanzbühne productions.

In 1923, she established her own school in Berlin and also taught at Carl Diem's sports academy, successfully combining gymnastics with nudism and dance. She continued to dance in Laban's productions, starring as Donna Elvira in his Don Juan (1926). Her school's freestyle movements were pictured at the Berlin Stadium. In 1927 she appeared in the only film made by the American Stella Simon. The avant-garde film entitled Hands: The Life and Love of a Gentle Sex had its own score by Marc Blitzstein and it tells of an eternal triangle story using just the hands and forearms of the dancers.

In 1928, Feist toured with the Novembergruppe, presenting her Der Berufung in Germany, Poland, Switzerland and England. Her last major production was Gluck's Iphigénie en Aulide performed on the steps of the Pergamon Museum in May 1933. Her ambitions were then curtailed by the Nazis who closed her school and forced her to move into smaller quarters although she continued to attract many students.

After the war, she taught at the Volkshochschule Hannover from 1952 to 1965. Her last dance was performed for the inauguration of the Golden Rosenkreuz Temple at Bad Münder in 1965 where she lived at the time. From 1983, she returned to live in Hannover where she died on 9 July 1990.

== See also ==
- Women in dance
- Olga Desmond

== Literature ==
- Peter, Frank-Manuel: Hertha Feist. Vornehme Eleganz und melancholische Wölkchen. Nachruf auf die Berliner Labanpädagogin. In: Tanzdrama. No. 13, 4th quarter 1990, pp. 34–37.
- Toepfer, Karl Eric (1997). Empire of Ecstasy: Nudity and Movement in German Body Culture, 1910-1935. University of California Press. ISBN 978-0-520-91827-6.
