= Codarts =

Codarts University for the Arts
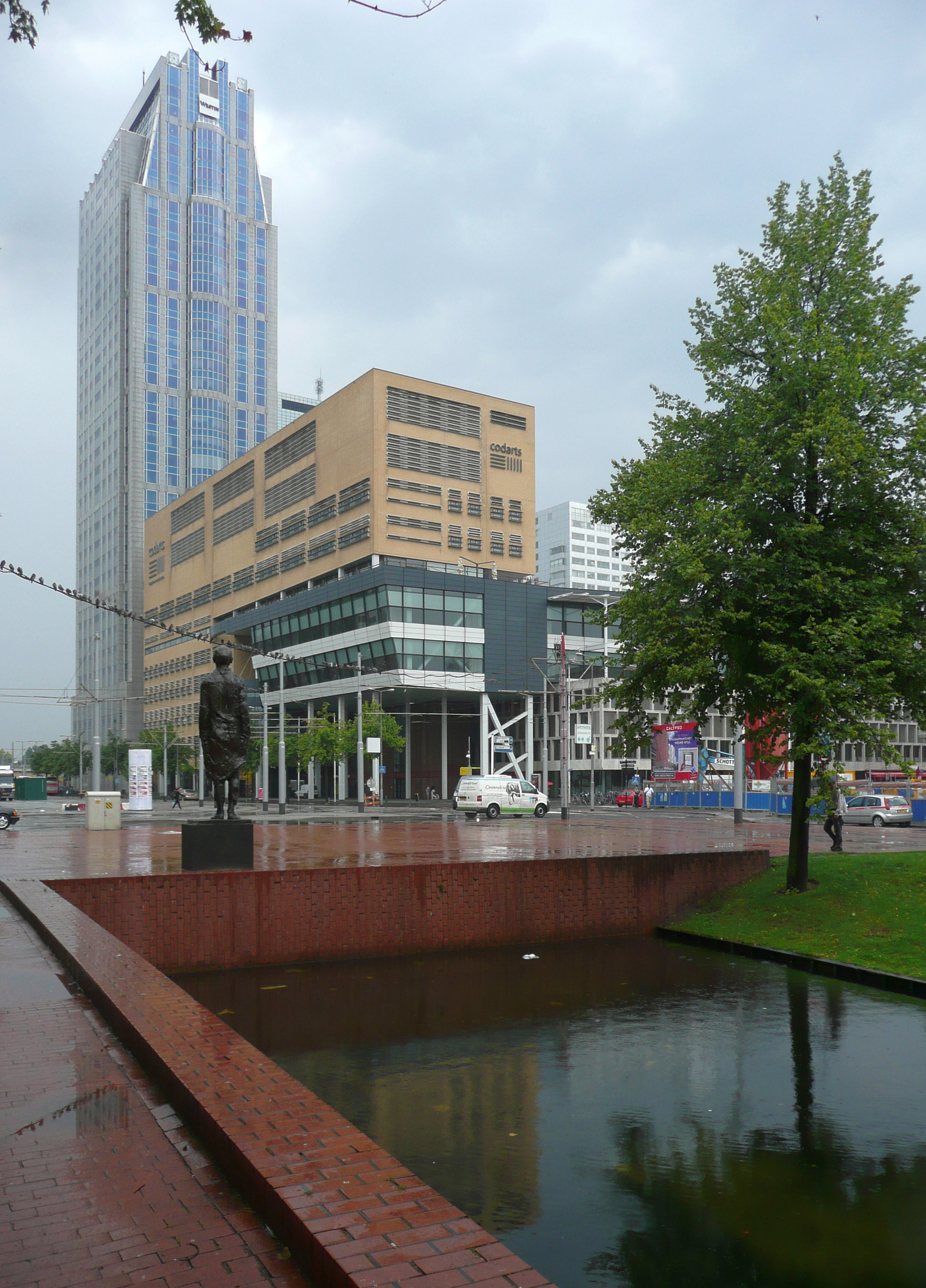
- Codarts building, Millenium Tower in the background. The Doelen conference center extends under part of the building.

Location
- Rotterdam; Netherlands
- Coordinates: 51.922125°N 4.471733°E

Information
- Website: www.codarts.nl/EN/

Codarts University for the Arts (Dutch: Codarts hogeschool voor de kunsten) is a Dutch vocational university in Rotterdam that teaches music, dance and circus. It was established in its present location in 2000.

== History ==
Codarts can trace its origins to the Rotterdams Conservatorium voor Muziek (Rotterdam Conservatory of Music), popularly known as the Conservatorium Holthaus after its director, Jos Holthaus (1879–1943). In 1886 the German violinist Willy Hess took up a professorship in the Rotterdams Conservatorium voor Muziek which he held for two years.

In 1930, the alternative Rotterdamsch Toonkunst Conservatorium (Rotterdam Musical Arts Conservatory) was founded with the composer Willem Pijper as director. The Rotterdamse Dansschool (Rotterdam Dance School) was established in 1931 by Corrie Hartong as director and the German dancer Gertrud Leistikow as a teacher. At first the dance school was part of the Conservatorium Holthaus. In 1935 the dance school transferred to Pijper's conservatory. Hartong remained as director. She was to stay in this position until 1961, and continued to teach until 1967.

World War II broke out in 1939 and the Netherlands were invaded in May 1940. On 14 May 1940 the buildings of the dance school and the main building of Pijper's conservatory were destroyed by bombs. It was decided to merge Pijper's and Holthaus's conservatories into one building on Mathenesserlaan, where Holthaus had a branch. Soon they moved again to a big old house that had somehow been spared, totally surrounded by rubble, and managed to continue day classes and early evening classes before curfew throughout the remainder of the war. Until Holthaus died in 1943 the combined conservatory had two directors.

The Rotterdamse Dansschool was renamed the Rotterdamse Dansacademie (Rotterdam Dance Academy) in 1954. In 1986 the Conservatory and Dance Academy became the Hogeschool voor Muziek en Theater Rotterdam (Rotterdam University of Music and Theatre). The school moved into its present modern building next to the Doelen concert hall in 2000 under the name Codarts – hogeschool voor de kunsten (Codarts – University of the Arts). The Circus arts program was launched in September 2006.

== Schools ==
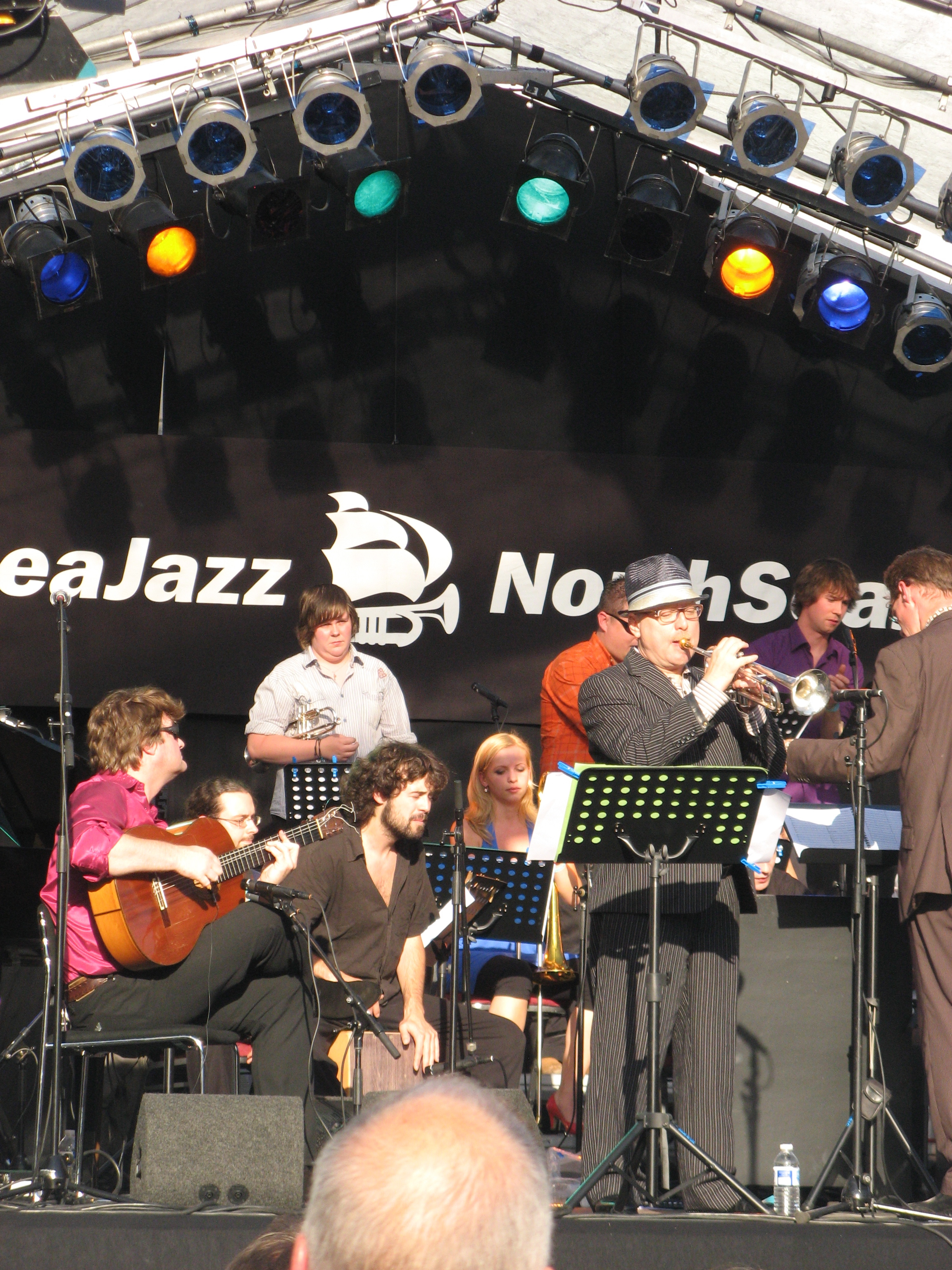
Codarts Big Band, conducted by Ilja Reijngoud, at the North Sea Jazz Festival, July 2008

Codarts has three divisions: the Rotterdam Conservatory, Rotterdam Dance Academy, and Rotterdam Circus Arts.

The Rotterdam Conservatory is one of the largest conservatories in the Netherlands, with over 900 pupils. It offers courses through which students may obtain a bachelor's degree in any of several disciplines: Music Theater, Pop, Jazz, Composition/arranging, Music Production, Argentinean tango, Indian music, Flamenco, Latin/Latin jazz/Brazilian, Turkish music, Classical music, and Music in Education. The school puts on public performances, at times using the adjacent De Doelen concert hall. Thus in April 2011 guest conductor Arie van Beek led the Codarts Orchestra and Codarts Chamber Choir in a performance in the Jurriaanse Hall. In September 2011 the Codarts Ensemble performed a program that explored the boundary between classical music and jazz, with works by Stravinsky, Gershwin, Shostakovich, Antheil and Harvey. The Codarts Ensemble played again at De Doelen in March 2012 with the Codarts Chamber Choir, performing a major work by Arthur Honegger. They were conducted by Wiecher Mandemaker.

The Dance Academy teaches dancers and arranges for students to appear in performances and tours. Codarts helps students gain practical experience with internships with noted dance companies, and participates in student exchange programs with other European and American dance schools. In May 2011 the Rotterdam Dance Academy performed at the Venice Biennale with a show called Talent on the Move. The program included works by established choreographers such as Jiří Kylián, Nacho Duato and Mauro Bigonzetti and by younger artists including graduates of the academy.

The Circus Arts school began offering a bachelor's course in September 2006, training students for careers in contemporary and traditional circus, in variety shows and in local or street theater. Circus students learn dance and drama as well as a wide range of circus techniques to prepare for a professional career.

The Havo voor Muziek en Dans (High School for Music and Dance) provides a secondary school education in which music and dance are part of the daily curriculum. It is co-located in the Codarts building and Codarts teachers teach the music and dance classes. The school prepares students for higher music education, but graduates must still pass entrance examinations to continue at Codarts. The high school was the subject of the 2007 documentary De Droomfabriek (The Dream Factory) directed by Netty van Hoorn.

== Building ==
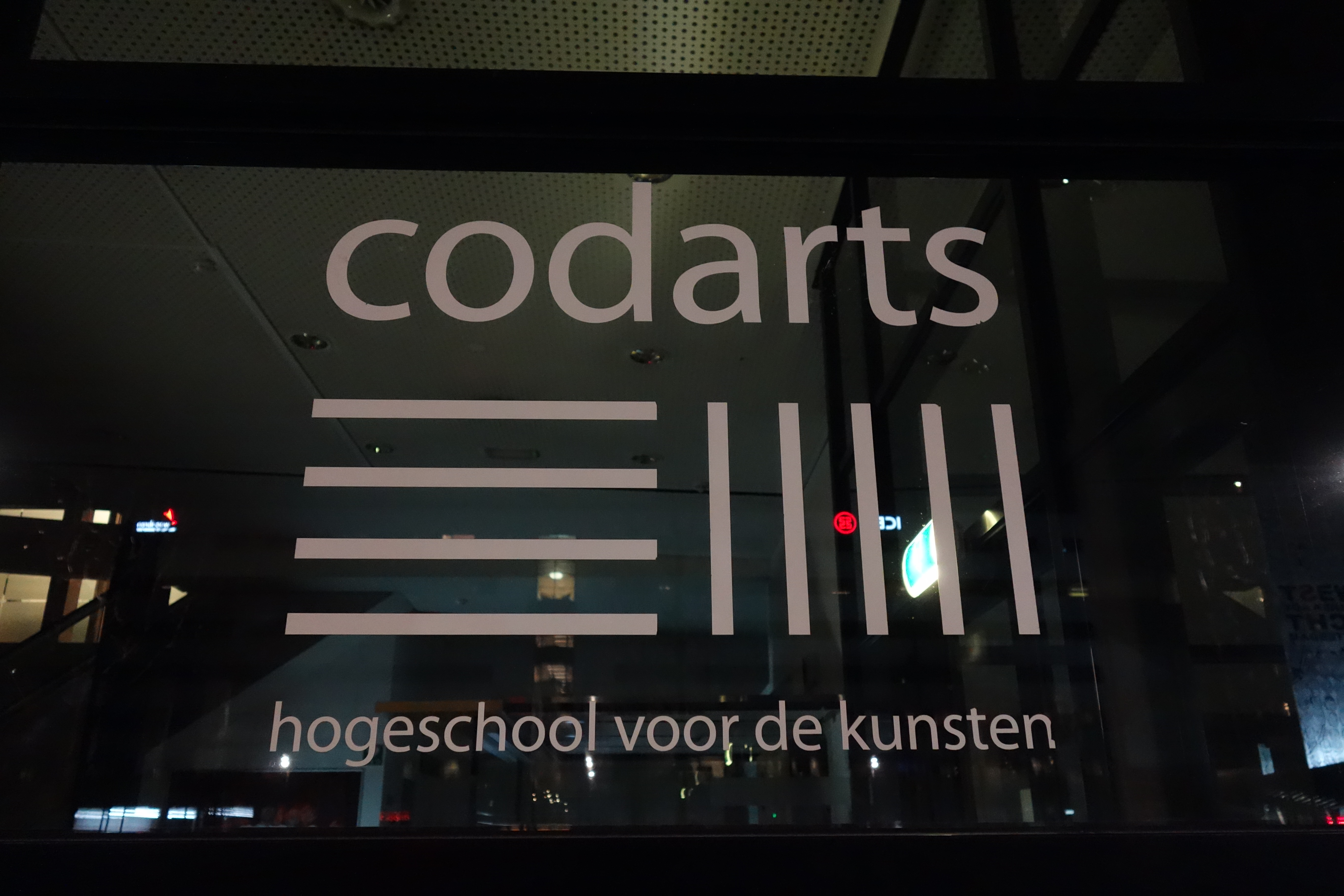
Codarts Rotterdam

The building abuts the 1966 De Doelen concert and conference building, home of the Rotterdam Philharmonic Orchestra. It was built as part of an overall plan for an extension to De Doelen defined in 1993 by Jan Hoogstad. A new building site beside the Kruisplein was created by reducing the size of Karel Doormanstraat, and this was used for the Doelen extension and the Codarts building. The building was developed by the architectural firm of Ector Hoogstad, and was completed in 2000. The plinth is mainly used for commercial purposes. The building is relatively high to accommodate all the demands of the school, and has a total floor space of 10,500 square metres (113,000 sq ft). Visually, the Codarts building appears to reach over the end of the conference center.

The building's steel skeleton supports a "box in box" design for the interior spaces, including several tall spaces with variable lighting. A long escalator connects the entrance lobby to the fifth floor. This is the main floor for Codarts, holding the restaurant, library and several performance rooms, and opening onto a terrace on the roof of the Doelen extension. Codarts occupies classrooms and offices below this floor. The conservatory is above it and the large dance studios are at the top of the building. The building is clad in brick to give an appearance consistent with nearby apartment buildings.

== Notable alumni ==
- San Holo, Dutch record producer and DJ
- Ralph Kaminski, Polish singer and songwriter
- Ike Moriz, German-South African singer, composer and actor.
- Vivian Panka, Dutch theatre actress and musical performer
- Froukje Veenstra, Dutch singer and songwriter
- Willemijn Verkaik, Dutch theatre actress, best known for playing Elphaba from the musical Wicked in the Netherlands, Germany, New York and London.
- Henk van der Vliet, Dutch composer and flautist
- Annie van 't Zelfde, Dutch jazz musician
