= Trude Fleischmann =

American photographer

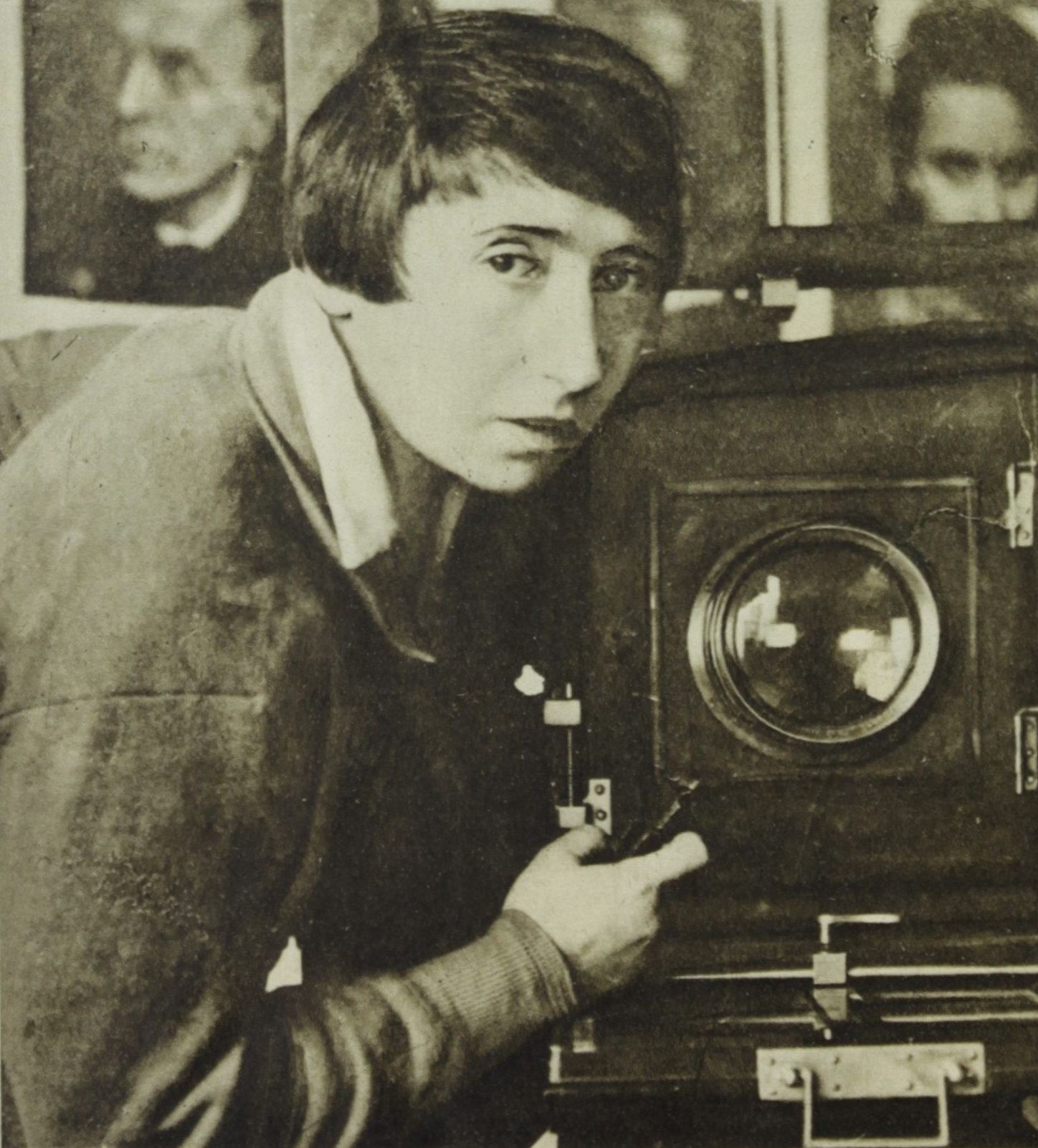
- Born: 22 December 1895; Vienna
- Died: 21 January 1990; Brewster
- Occupation: Photographer

Gertrude (Trude) Fleischmann (22 December 1895 – 20 January 1990) was an Austrian-born American photographer. After becoming a notable society photographer in Vienna in the 1920s, she re-established her business in New York in 1940.

== Early life ==
Born in Vienna in December 1895, Fleischmann was the second of three children in a well-to-do Jewish family. After matriculating from high school, she spent a semester studying art history in Paris followed by three years of photography at the Lehr- und Versuchsanstalt für Photographie und Reproduktionsverfahren in Vienna. She then worked for a short period as an apprentice in Dora Kallmus' fashionable Atelier d'Ora and for a longer period for photographer Hermann Schieberth. In 1919, she joined the Photographische Gesellschaft in Wien (Vienna Photographic Society).

== Career ==
In 1920, at the age of 25, Fleischmann opened her own studio close to Vienna's city hall. Her glass plates benefitted from her careful use of diffuse artificial light. Photographing music and theatre celebrities, her work was published in journals such as Die Bühne, Moderne Welt, 'Welt und Mode and Uhu. She was represented by Schostal Photo Agency (Agentur Schostal). In addition to portraits of Karl Kraus and Adolf Loos, in 1925 she took a nude series of the dancer Claire Bauroff which the police confiscated when the images were displayed at a Berlin theatre, bringing her international fame. Fleischmann also did much to encourage other women to become professional photographers. In 1929, Romanian photographer Hedy Löffler trained in Fleishmann's atelier.

With the Anschluss in 1938, Fleischmann was forced to leave the country. She moved first to Paris, then to London and finally, together with her former student and companion Helen Post, in April 1939 to New York. In 1940, she opened a studio on West 56th Street next to Carnegie Hall which she ran with Frank Elmer who had also emigrated from Vienna. In addition to scenes of New York City, she photographed celebrities and notable immigrants including Albert Einstein, Eleanor Roosevelt, Oskar Kokoschka, Lotte Lehmann, Otto von Habsburg, Count Richard von Coudenhove-Kalergi and Arturo Toscanini. She also worked as a fashion photographer, contributing to magazines such as Vogue. She established a close friendship with the photographer Lisette Model.

== Later life ==
On retirement in 1969, Fleischmann went to Lugano, Switzerland. After a serious fall in 1987, she returned to the United States where she lived with her nephew, the pianist Stefan Carell, in Brewster. She died there on 21 January 1990.

== Exhibitions ==
Trude Fleischmann's work was presented at the Vienna Museum, Vienna, January to May 2011, in an exhibition titled "Trude Fleischmann: Der sebstbewusste Blick".

== See also ==
- Olga Desmond
- Gertrud Leistikow

== Literature ==
- Fleischmann, Trude; Holzer, Anton; Kreutler, Frauke (2011). Self-assured eye. Distributed Art Pub Incorporated. ISBN 978-3-7757-2780-8.
