= Henk van der Vliet =

Dutch flautist and composer

Henk van der Vliet (born 1928) is a Dutch flautist and composer of contemporary classical music. Born in Rotterdam, Van der Vliet began musical studies on the accordion when attending the Rotterdam Toonkunstmuziekschool. He chose the flute as his instrument and commenced studies at the Rotterdam Conservatory of Music in 1945 and graduated in 1950. He studied under Jan van Dijk and Johan Feltkamp. After graduation, he taught the flute and played with the Rotterdam Kamerorkest (Rotterdam Chamber Orchestra). Starting in 1965, he began to compose music—without having had any previous studies in composition, he is a self-taught composer.

In 2023, aged 95, he was named the oldest composer in the Netherlands by BN DeStem.
