= Havo voor Muziek en Dans =

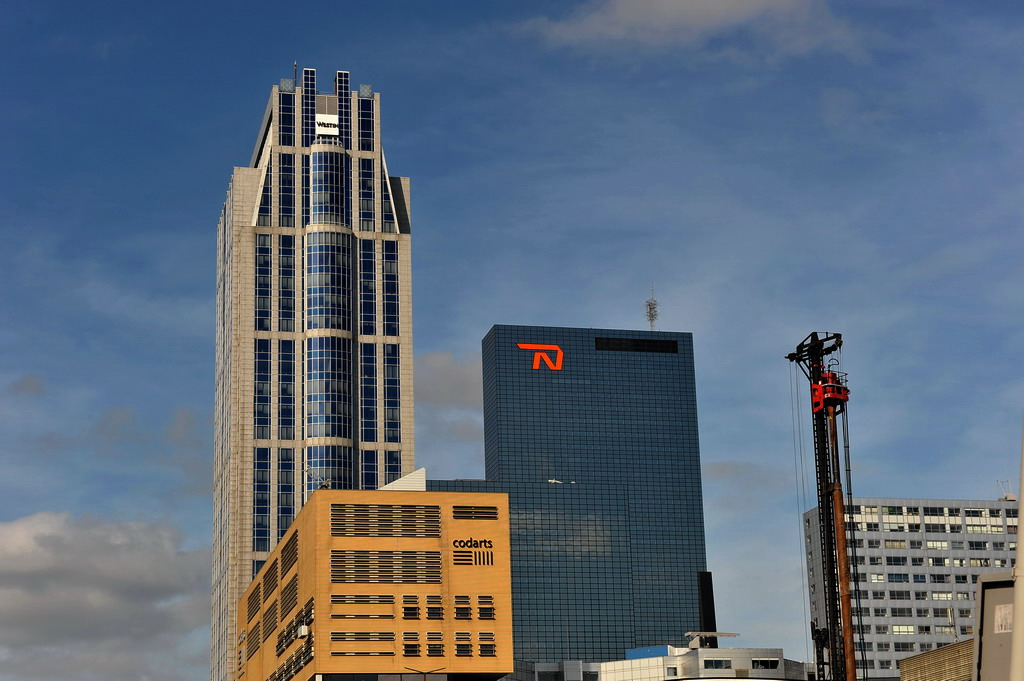
- Codarts building (orange) in central Rotterdam, in front of the Millennium Tower

Location
- Rotterdam; Netherlands
- Coordinates: 51.922125°N 4.471733°E

Information
- Enrolment: 200 (2012)
- Website: www.hmd.nl

Havo voor Muziek en Dans (School for Music and Dance) formerly Hogeschool voor Muziek en Dans is a secondary school (havo) in Rotterdam, Netherlands that specializes in music and dance. It has about 200 pupils from all parts of the country.

The Havo voor Muziek en Dans shares a building and music and dance teachers with Codarts, the Conservatory of Music and Dance Academy.

== Program ==
The Havo voor Muziek en Dans provides a secondary school education in which music and dance are part of the daily curriculum. Students receive about seven hours of music lessons each week or fifteen hours of dance. It is a small school with an enrollment of about 200 students from across the country. The course prepares them for study at a conservatory or dance academy, but graduates must still pass entrance examinations to continue at the conservatory. Standard classroom subjects are taught using a fairly conservative or traditional approach, but exam results are above the national average. The school has two bridging classes - music and dance - and a bridging year.

The school organizes regular performances and shows so the students gain stage experience. For example, for two days in June 2010 the students put on the show Talent On The Move 2010 at the Isala Theater, featuring choreography by Sara Erens, Jiří Kylián, Adriaan Luteijn, Hans van Manen and Stuart Thom as well as original solos by the fifth year students.

== Facilities and staff ==
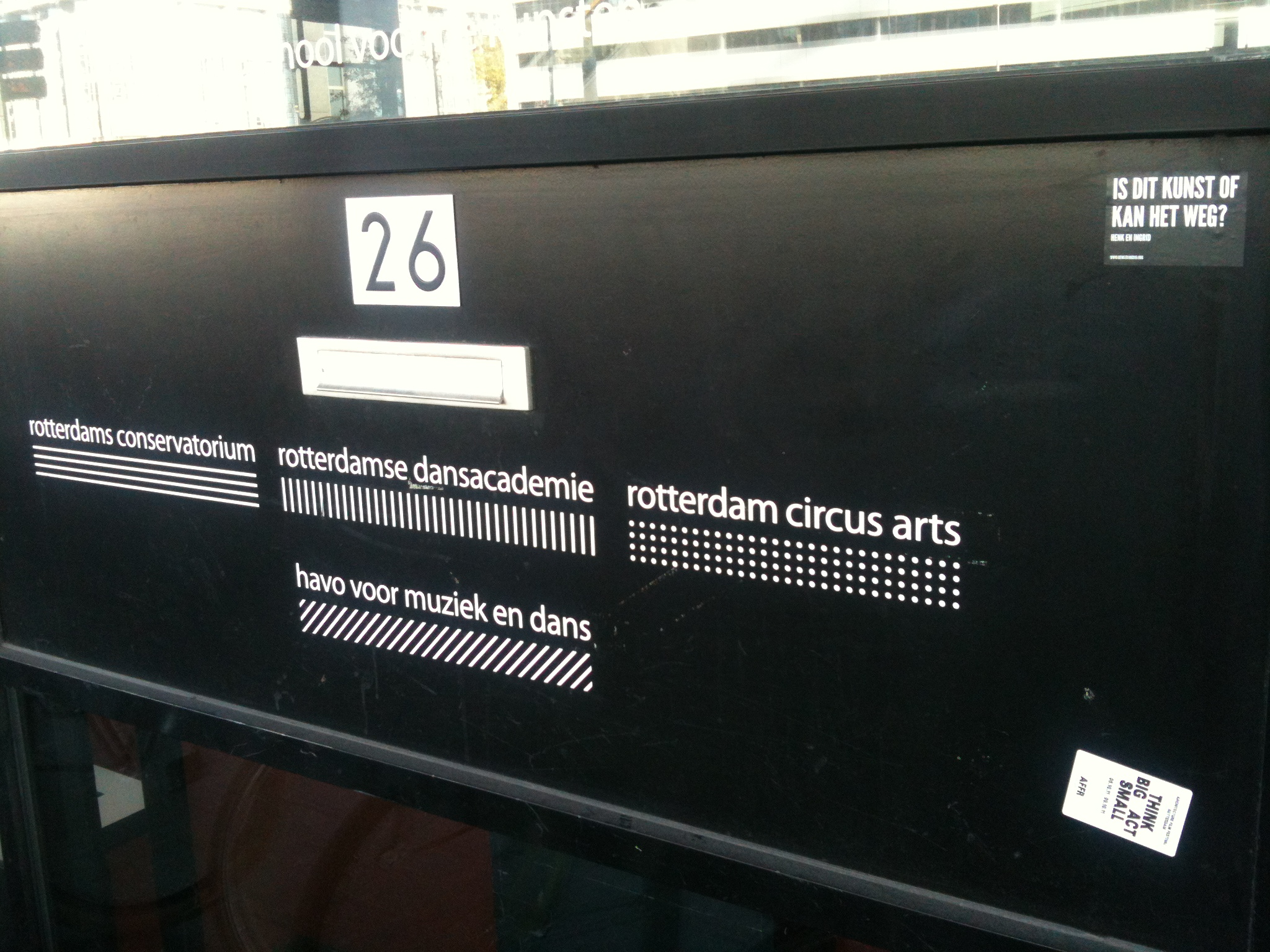
The Codarts schools: Havo voor Muziek en Dans below the conservatory, dance academy and circus arts

The Havo voor Muziek en Dans is co-located in the same modern building as Codarts, the Conservatory of Music and Dance Academy, and music and dance are taught by Codarts teachers. There are about 25 regular teachers and a large number of teachers from the Conservatory. The school is operated by the LMC Secondary Education Foundation, which operates several independent schools in the Rotterdam area. The school is unique in the Netherlands, with no competitors.

A formal review of the school in October 2005 found that the building had excellent facilities for dance and music training. The regular classrooms are rather cramped, but generally the school's accommodation is very good. The staff are cheerful and have considerable autonomy. Students are motivated and parents are involved. On a less positive note, the lack of competition is not conducive to improvements in quality. The relatively small, stable team of teachers is a positive factor, but gives little incentive for innovation, and the complex management structure involving LMC and Codarts sometimes causes delays in decision making.

== People ==
The trumpeter John Floore served as director of the school between 1983 and 1997. Two former students received a Corrie Hartong scholarship for the 2011-2012 academic year, Joris Bergmans for an internship at Introdans in Arnhem and Christopher Renfurm at Alvin Ailey American Dance Theater in New York City. In the documentary De Droomfabriek (the Dream Factory, 2006) Netty van Hoorn depicts the passion of the students and the teachers, as well as their daily lives. To make the documentary, van Hoorn and her cameraman Onno van der Wal visited the Academy intermittently over ten months and filmed pupils from a wide range of backgrounds.
