= Isala Theater =

- Location within Netherlands
- Address: Capelle aan den IJssel; Netherlands
- Coordinates: 51.931557°N 4.588203°E
- Capacity: 512 seats (main hall)
- Current use: Theatre, Cinema

Construction
- Opened: 1999
- Architect: Martien van Goor

Website
- www.isalatheater.nl

The Isala Theater is a modern theater opened in 1999 in Capelle aan den IJssel near Rotterdam, the Netherlands.

The theater offers a comprehensive program including music, comedy, drama, musicals, dance and youth programs. It also screens films. The theatre is the main venue where the DPFC dance school puts on semi-professional theater productions, which usually attract full houses. For two days in June 2010 the theatre staged a show by the students of the Havo voor Muziek en Dans (Academy for Music and Dance) called Talent On The Move 2010, featuring choreography by Sara Erens, Jiří Kylián, Adriaan Luteijn, Hans van Manen and Stuart Thom as well as original solos of the fifth graders.
