= Jim Breukelman =

Canadian artist and photographer

Jim Breukelman (born 1941) is a Canadian artist and photographer.

== Life ==
Breukelman was born in Pointe-à-Pierre, Trinidad and Tobago on September 19, 1941. After receiving a Bachelor of Fine Arts degree from the Rhode Island School of Design in 1966, he went on to found the Fine Art Photography program at the Vancouver School of Art (now Emily Carr University of Art and Design) in 1967. Breukelman taught at the school from 1967 until his retirement in 2000.

== Work ==
Breukelman is known for his photographic landscapes of urban scenes. His 1980s series Hot properties documented small houses in Vancouver, Canada that were at risk of demolition due to the real estate market. In 2013, Canada Post released a postage stamp depicting his photograph Hot Properties #1.

== Awards ==
In 2012, Breukelman received the Vancouver Mayor's Arts award in the visual arts category.

== Collections ==
Breukelman's work is included in the collection of the National Gallery of Canada.

== Public art ==
Breukelman's work Fish Ladder: Salmon in the Capilano is permanently installed in the Vancouver City Centre station of Vancouver's Canada Line metro system.
