= Maaroufi =

Maaroufi is a surname. Notable people with the surname include:

- Abdallah El Maaroufi (1944–2011), Moroccan diplomat
- Ibrahim Maaroufi (born 1989), Moroccan footballer
- Mohamed Maaroufi (1949–2025), Moroccan footballer
- Tarek Maaroufi, Tunisian terrorist
