= Netty van Hoorn =

Dutch film director and producer (born 1951)

- Born: 14 June 1951 (age 74); Amsterdam, Netherlands
- Occupation: Film Director
- Known for: Zelfmoord van een vluchteling

Netty van Hoorn (born 14 June 1951) is a Dutch film director and producer who has won several awards for her work.

== Biography ==
Van Hoorn was born in Amsterdam on 14 June 1951. She graduated in 1983 at the Dutch Film and Television Academy. She has directed many documentaries, commercials and theater plays.

In the documentary De Droomfabriek (the Dream Factory, 2006) Netty van Hoorn depicts the passion of the students and the teachers at the Havo voor Muziek en Dans (Academy for Music and Dance) in Rotterdam and the large and small dramas of their lives in a school that is unique in the Netherlands.

== Prizes ==
In 1989 Van Hoorn was nominated for a Golden Calf for the film Sweet & Hot Music. In 1992 she won the Loe de Jong prize for the documentary De watersnoodramp (The flood). In 1995 she was again nominated for a Golden Calf for the documentary The International Singing Star Leo Fuld. In 2002 she won the Dutch Academy Award for the documentary Zelfmoord van een vluchteling (Suicide of a refugee) and was twice nominated for a Golden Calf.

== Filmography ==
- De zevende etage (1981)
- Ellen Muriël (1983)
- De straat (1985)
- In de war (1986)
- Rok en Rol (1986)
- Sweet & Hot Music (1989)
- Gelati (1990)
- Achter de dijk (1991)
- De watersnoodramp (1992)
- Variété, Artiest voor 't leven (1992)
- Minder beter (1994)
- Na de oorlog (1994)
- De winkelwagentjesbrigade (1994)
- Het verhaal achter het kleine gruwelijke krantenbericht (1994)
- Te koop (1994)
- The international Singing Star Leo Fuld (1995)
- Je gelooft 't niet (1995)
- Verhuis (1995)
- Curaçao, van Watamula tot Punt Kanon (1996) 26 delen
- Curaçao - Tamki Wambu zonder nummer (1997)
- Curaçao - Mooi van binnen en van buiten (1997)
- Curaçao - Mooie meisjes, mooie bloemen (1997)
- Frank McCourt (1998)
- Willem Breuker "Time is an Empty Bottle of Wine" (2000)
- Zelfmoord van een vluchteling (2002)
- Circus en Variété - Het bloed kruipt.......... (2004)
- Macbeth aan de Maas (2005)
- De Droomfabriek (2006/2007)
- Een noodlottige ontmoeting (2007)
