= List of Dutch musicians =

A list of Dutch bands and artists of contemporary music. The bands and artists are either Dutch, of Dutch origin or contain Dutch members.

== A ==
- Thomas Acda (b. 1967): Dutch actor and singer
- Sharon den Adel (b. 1974): Dutch singer and composer
- Afrojack
- Rob Agerbeek (b. 1937): Indonesian-born Dutch boogie-woogie and jazz pianist
- Jan Akkerman (b. 1946): Dutch guitarist
- Alain Clark
- Willeke Alberti (b. 1945): Dutch singer and actress
- Willy Alberti (1926–1985): Dutch singer, actor, and radio and TV personality
- Ali B
- Alice Deejay
- Amber
- Louis Andriessen
- Angel-Eye
- Anneke van Giersbergen
- Anouk (b. 1975): Dutch singer
- Armin van Buuren
- André Rieu

Back to top

== B ==
- Ali B (b. 1981): Dutch rapper and comedian of Moroccan descent.
- Baas B
- George Baker
- Cor Bakker
- Jim Bakkum (b. 1987): Dutch singer and actor
- Lou Bandy (1890–1959): Dutch singer and conferencier
- Olav Basoski
- Bassjackers
- Blasterjaxx
- Frans Bauer (b. 1973): Dutch singer of "het levenslied"
- Han Bennink
- Thomas Berge
- Marco Blaauw
- Blaudzun
- Karin Bloemen
- Scott Bloemendaal (1912–1964): Dutch composer, music critic and essayist
- Frank Boeijen (b. 1957): Dutch singer
- Ferdi Bolland
- Rob Bolland
- Bonky (Onno Borgen)
- Boris (b. 1980): Dutch singer, winner of Idols
- Marco Borsato (b. 1966): Dutch singer
- Stef Bos (b. 1961): Dutch singer, also sings in Afrikaans
- Patty Brard (b. 1955): Indo (Dutch-Indonesian) entertainer as a TV personality and singer
- Arjan Breukhoven (b. 1962): organist and choir conductor
- Ria Brieffies
- Willem Breuker
- Corry Brokken (1932–2016): Dutch singer
- Sera de Bruin (born 1994): Dutch pop singer
- Herman Brood (1946–2001): Dutch musician, painter and media personality
- Brutus
- Xander de Buisonjé
- Marga Bult
- Armin van Buuren (b. 1976): Dutch trance music producer and DJ

Back to top

== C ==
- Juultje Cambré (1914–1990)
- Humphrey Campbell
- Rudi Carrell (1934–2006): Dutch television entertainer and host of The Rudi Carrell Show
- The Cats
- Eddy Christiani
- Alain Clark
- Robbert van de Corput (otherwise known as Hardwell) DJ and producer
- Ferry Corsten (b. 1973): Dutch trance music producer, DJ, and remixer
- Jules de Corte (1924–1996): Blind singer-songwriter from the Netherlands
- Gerard Cox
- Ben Cramer

Back to top

== D ==
- Ellen ten Damme (b. 1967): Dutch actress and singer
- Louis Davids
- Def Rhymz (b. 1970): Dutch rapper
- Esmée Denters
- Bill van Dijk (b. 1947): Dutch singer and musical performer
- Louis van Dijk (1941–2020): Dutch pianist
- Sander Van Doorn (b. 1979): Dutch electro house DJ and record producer
- Hans Dorrestijn (b. 1940): Dutch comedian
- Wieteke van Dort (b. 1943): Dutch actress, comedian, singer, writer and artist
- Tim Douwsma
- Dorus
- André van Duin (b. 1947): Dutch actor (in comedy and theatre), singer, writer and program creator
- Candy Dulfer (b. 1969): Dutch smooth jazz alto saxophonist
- Hans Dulfer (b. 1940): Dutch jazz musician who plays tenor saxophone
- Willem Duyn
- Dotan Dutch Singer-Songwriter

Back to top

== E ==
- Polle Eduard
- Eva Simons
- EliZe (b. 1982): Dutch singer-songwriter
- Les Esprits Animaux, Netherlands-based baroque orchestra

Back to top

== F ==
- Bobby Farrell (1949–2010): Dutch performer in the 1970s pop and disco group Boney M.
- Fedde Le Grand
- Firebeatz
- René Froger (b. 1960): Dutch singer
- Leo Fuld (1912–1997): Dutch singer who specialised in Yiddish songs
- Laura Fygi (b. 1955): Dutch singer

Back to top

== G ==
- Tess Gaerthé (b. 1991): Dutch singer
- Martijn Garritsen (AKA Martin Garrix), DJ known for his hit single "Animals"
- Eelco Gelling
- Glennis Grace (b. 1978): Dutch singer
- Anneke Grönloh
- Boudewijn de Groot (b. 1944): Dutch singer-songwriter
- Angela Groothuizen

Back to top

== H ==
- Bernard Haitink
- Willem van Hanegem Jr.: a member of the EDM duo W&W
- Tol Hansse
- Wardt van der Harst: a member of the EDM duo W&W
- Esther Hart (b. 1970): Dutch singer
- Barry Hay (b. 1948): Dutch vocalist with the group Golden Earring
- André Hazes (1951–2004): Dutch singer of "het levenslied"
- Heintje
- Ruben Hein (born 1982), Dutch singer, pianist and composer
- Misja Helsloot
- Toon Hermans (1916–2000): Dutch comedian, singer and writer
- Mathijs Heyligers (b. 1957): violinist and violin maker
- Antonie Kamerling (1966–2010): Dutch television and film actor
- Hind (b. 1984): Dutch singer
- José Hoebee (b. 1954): Dutch pop female singer
- Rob Hoeke
- Barry Hughes
- Henny Huisman (b. 1951): Dutch television presenter
- Ilse Huizinga (b. 1966): Dutch jazz singer
- De Hûnekop: Frisian rockband

Back to top

== I ==
- Imran Khan

Back to top

== J ==
- Pim Jacobs (1934–1996): Dutch jazz pianist and television presenter
- Ruth Jacott
- Marike Jager (b. 1979): Dutch singer, guitarist and composer
- Floor Jansen
- Steven Jansen (b. 1993): a member of the EDM duo Lucas & Steve
- Ernst Jansz
- Candee Jay
- DJ Jean (b. 1968): Dutch disc jockey
- Gerard Joling (b. 1960): Dutch singer and television presenter
- Michael De Jong (1945-2018): Dutch blues musician
- Freek de Jonge (b. 1944): Dutch cabaret performer
- Johnny Jordaan (1924–1989): Dutch folk singer
- Tjibbe Joustra (b. 1951): Dutch artist of paintings, videoart, graphic design, soundscapes
- Julian Jordan
- Joost Klein: represented the Netherlands at Eurovision 2024.

Back to top

== K ==
- Jerney Kaagman
- Pierre Kartner (b. 1935): Dutch musician also known as Father Abraham
- Greetje Kauffeld (b. 1939): Dutch jazz singer and Schlager musician
- Simon Keizer Nick & Simon
- Kensington
- Sharon Kips (b. 1983): Dutch singer
- René Klijn
- Tim Kliphuis (b. 1974): Dutch violinist
- Peter Koelewijn (b. 1940): Dutch producer and songwriter, founding father of Dutch language rock and roll
- Jean Koning
- Lenny Kuhr (b. 1950): Dutch singer-songwriter
- Wolter Kroes

Back to top

== L ==
- Natalie La Rose: singer, model
- Wilma Landkroon (b. 1957): Dutch pop singer
- Yuri Landman (b. 1973): Dutch experimental luthier and musicologist
- Ilse De Lange
- Lange Frans
- Thé Lau
- Duncan Laurence (b. 1994): Dutch singer-songwriter
- Thijs van Leer (b. 1948): Dutch keyboardist, singer, composer, member of Focus
- Paul de Leeuw (b. 1962): Dutch television comedian, singer and actor
- Robbie van Leeuwen
- Legowelt ( – ): Dutch electro musician
- Heddy Lester (b. 1950): Dutch singer and actress
- Liesbeth List (1941–2020): Dutch singer and chansonnier
- Jamai Loman (b. 1986): Dutch singer, reality show winner
- Robert Long (1943–2006): Dutch singer and television presenter
- Huub van der Lubbe
- Suzanna Lubrano (b. 1975): Cape Verdean Zouk singer based in Rotterdam
- Arjen Anthony Lucassen (b. 1960): Dutch composer and musician
- Erik van der Luijt (b. 1970): Dutch jazz pianist / keyboard player, arranger, composer, producer and band leader

Back to top

== M ==
- Maan (b. 1997): Dutch singer and actress
- Maggie MacNeal (b. 1950)
- Tom Manders
- André Manuel (b. 1966): Dutch singer and performer
- Maribelle
- Marlayne (b. 1971): Dutch singer and television presenter
- Martin Garrix
- Maud (b. 1981): Dutch singer, reality show finalist
- Guus Meeuwis (b. 1972): Dutch singer and songwriter
- Meau (b. 2000): Dutch singer-songwriter
- Miners of Muzo
- Misha Mengelberg
- Willem Mengelberg
- Michelle (b. 1981): Dutch singer
- CB Milton (b. 1968): Dutch Euro-house vocalist
- Michael Moore
- Irene Moors
- Danny de Munk (b. 1970): Dutch actor, singer, musical actor and former child star
- Harry Muskee

Back to top

== N ==
Nielson (b. 1989): Dutch singer-songwriter

- Noisia (b. 2002): Dutch Drum and Bass and Breaks
- Normaal (b. 1974): Dutch rockband

Back to top

== O ==
- Jacob Obrecht
- Trijntje Oosterhuis (b. 1973): Dutch pop and jazz singer
- Wijnand Ott
- Oliver Heldens

Back to top

== P ==
- Patricia Paay (b. 1949): Dutch model, singer, and commercial actress
- Jan Pijnenburg (1955–2026) — Dutch drummer and session musician
- Poldervokaal — Dutch vocal ensemble, formed in 1986

Back to top

== R ==
- Sandra Reemer
- Carlo Resoort
- Rita Reys (1924–2013): Dutch jazz singer
- André Rieu (b. 1949 ): Dutch violinist, conductor, and composer
- Edsilia Rombley (b. 1978): Dutch singer
- Maarten van Roozendaal
- Stochelo Rosenberg
- Jan Rot
- Nicky Romero
- R3hab

Back to top

== S ==
- S10 (b. 2000): Dutch singer, rapper and songwriter
- Harry Sacksioni (b. 1950): Dutch composer and guitar virtuoso
- Daniël Sahuleka
- Mathilde Santing
- Peter Schaap
- Marga Scheide (b. 1954): Dutch former model and singer
- Nick Schilder Nick & Simon
- Teddy Scholten (1926–2010): Dutch singer
- Birgit Schuurman (b. 1977): Dutch rock singer and actress
- Katja Schuurman (b. 1975): Dutch television and film actress, VJ, singer, and television personality
- Milly Scott (b. 1933): Dutch singer and actress
- Ramses Shaffy (1933–2009): Dutch singer, chansonnier, and actor
- René Shuman (b. 1967): Dutch singer
- Eva Simons
- Sita
- Jan Smit
- Monique Smit
- Wibi Soerjadi (b. 1970): Dutch internationally recognized concert pianist
- Solex
- Wim Sonneveld (1917–1974): Dutch cabaret artist and singer
- Spinvis (Erik de Jong) (b. 1961): Dutch pop singer and musician
- San Holo
- Bonnie St. Claire
- Ede Staal
- De Staat
- Thérèse Steinmetz
- Robert Jan Stips
- Melle Stomp (b. 1999): Dutch EDM producer and DJ, better known as Mesto
- Suzanna Lubrano
- Jan Pieterszoon Sweelinck

Back to top

== T ==
- Mieke Telkamp
- Julian Thomas
- Tiësto (b. 1969): trance DJ and electronic dance music producer
- Mirjam Timmer (b. 1982): Dutch singer-songwriter
- Ronnie Tober (b. 1945): Dutch-born singer
- Lee Towers (b. 1946): Dutch singer

Back to top

== V ==
- Valensia (b. 1971): Dutch singer, composer, producer and multi-instrumentalist
- Ria Valk
- Conny Vandenbos (1937–2002): Dutch singer
- Vast Countenance
- Herman van Veen (b. 1945): Dutch stage performer, actor, musician and singer/songwriter and author
- Cees Veerman
- Piet Veerman
- Vengaboys
- Venus Flytrap: Dutch indie rock band
- Danny Vera (b. 1977): Dutch singer-songwriter and musician
- Mariska Veres (1947–2006): Dutch lead singer of the rock group Shocking Blue
- Vicetone
- Ad Visser
- Eefje de Visser
- Hans Vonk
- Cornelis Vreeswijk (1937–1987): Dutch singer-songwriter, poet, and actor
- Henny Vrienten (b. 1948): Dutch composer of TV- and film-scores
- Clara de Vries (1915–1942), jazz trumpeter
- Erwin de Vries
- Louis de Vries (1905–1935), jazz trumpeter

Back to top

== W ==
- Toni Willé (b. 1953): Dutch singer, songwriter
- Edo de Waart
- Linda Wagenmakers (b. 1975): Dutch singer
- Nick van de Wall (AKA Afrojack) DJ and music producer
- Lucas de Wert (b. 1990): a member of the EDM duo Lucas & Steve
- Albert West
- Henk Westbroek (b. 1952): Dutch radio host, singer, songwriter and café owner
- Thijs Westbroek (b. 1995): Dutch EDM producer and DJ, better known as Brooks
- Danny Wolfers
- Piter Wilkens (b. 1959): Dutch singer, guitarist, composer, lyricist, and producer
- Mike Willemsen (b. 1996): Dutch EDM producer and DJ, better known as Mike Williams
- Henk Wijngaard (b. 1946): Dutch country singer

Back to top

== Y ==
- Yes-R

Back to top

== Z ==
- Zangeres zonder Naam
- Annie van 't Zelfde

Back to top

== See also ==
- List of bands from the Netherlands
- List of Afrikaans singers
- List of Dutch hip hop musicians
- List of Dutch singers
- List of Dutch composers
