= Heyliger =

Heyliger is a surname. Notable people with the surname include:

- Dillon Heyliger (born 1989), Canadian cricketer
- Frederick Heyliger (1916–2001), United States Army officer
- George Heyliger (1919–1942), United States Marine
- Grisha Heyliger-Marten (born 1976), Sint Maarten politician
- Hugh Heyliger (born 1945), Saint Kitts politician
- Vic Heyliger (1912–2006), American ice hockey player and coach

== See also ==
- USS Heyliger (DE-510), a United States Navy John C. Butler-class destroyer escort
- Mathijs Heyligers (born 1957), Dutch violin maker
