= Out of a Dream =

Out of a Dream may refer to:

- Out of a Dream (Ilse Huizinga album), 1997
- Out of a Dream (Reba McEntire album), 1979
