= Erik van der Luijt =

Dutch jazz keyboardist, arranger and composer (born 1970)

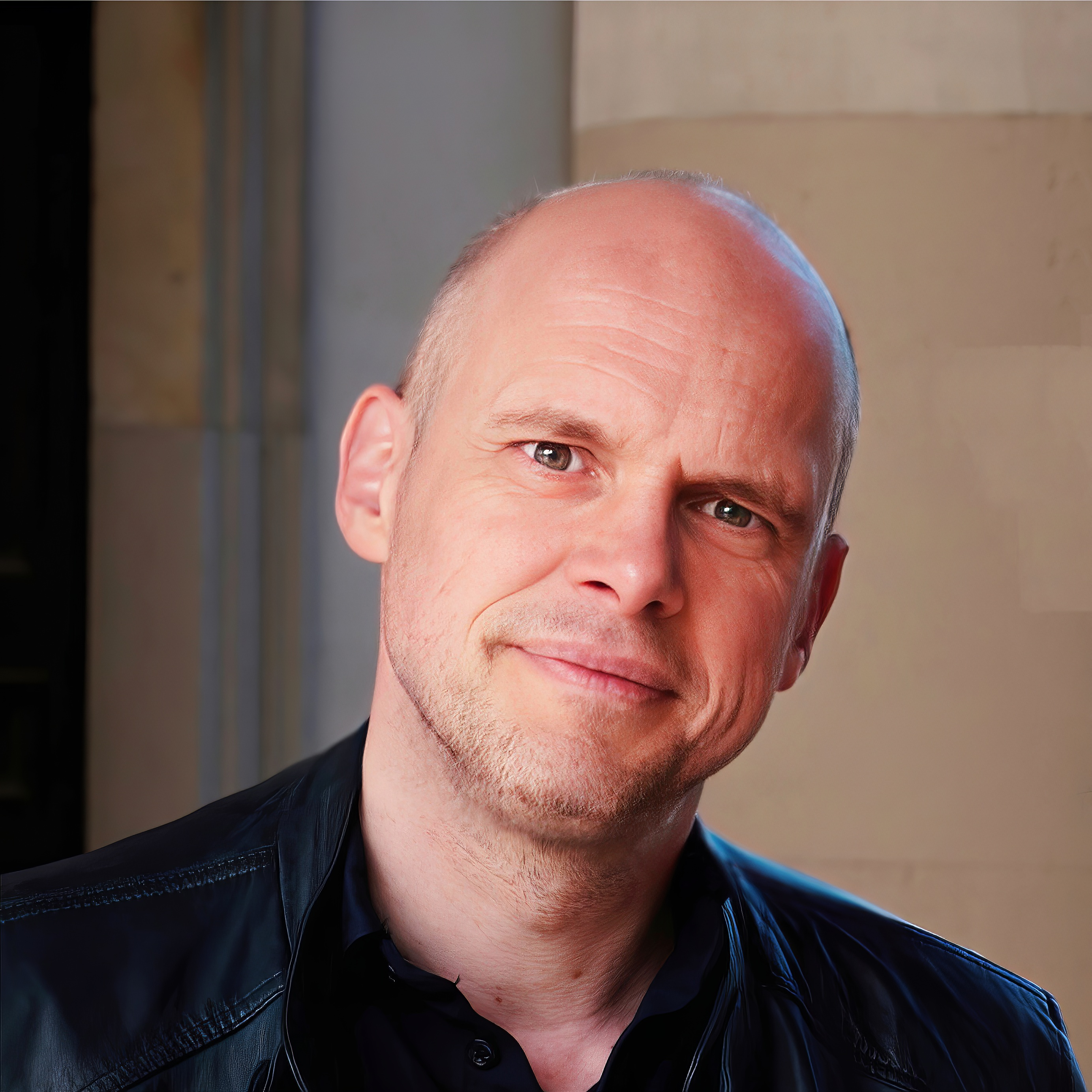
- van der Luijt in 2022

Background information
- Born: 22 August 1970 (age 55); The Hague, Netherlands
- Genres: Jazz
- Occupations: Musician, arranger, composer, record producer
- Instruments: Piano, keyboards

Erik van der Luijt (born 22 August 1970 in The Hague) is a Dutch jazz pianist and keyboard player and composer.

== History ==
Erik van der Luijt started playing the piano at the age of four. He studied jazz piano with Rob van Kreeveld and Rob van Bavel at the Royal Conservatory of The Hague, where he participated in master classes with Michel Petrucciani and Barry Harris.

== Style ==
Critics have praised Erik van der Luijt's talent for melody and the classical influences on his work. His style is likened with the subtle cohesion of legendary Bill Evans with his trio of the late 1950s, also in its fresh chord voicings and harmonic phrasing.

Van Der Luijt reflects a bit of a Keith Jarrett influence, particularly when he reaches for some wide gospel chord voicings. Essentially, however, he's his own man, with a muscular, surging swing and a powerful left hand. Van Der Luijt doesn't quite sound like anyone else out there, which is certainly an asset. He's also an engaging, witty composer. - Allaboutjazz.com

== Collaborations with other artists ==
Erik has contributed as a pianist, arranger and producer to six albums by his wife, the jazz singer Ilse Huizinga. He regularly accompanies and supports singers from various musical disciplines such as Rita Reys, Madeline Bell, Joke Bruijs, Joke de Kruijf, Pia Beck, Denise Jannah, Greetje Kauffeld, Heddy Lester, Gerrie van der Klei, Marjol Flore and Edwin Rutten. As a pianist, arranger and producer Erik has contributed to numerous projects, including the Metropole Orchestra, the Jazz Orchestra of the Royal Concertgebouw Orchestra, Ferdinand Povel, Piet Noordijk, Ruud Jacobs, Frits Landesbergen, Bernard Berkhout's Swingmates, the Royal Military Band, the Dutch Swing College Band, musical and cabaret productions and CDs by leading Dutch jazz musicians.

== Discography ==
- Keytown Swings - Volume 3 (NVGCD 01091, 1991)
- Good Enough To Keep, Bernard Berkhout's New Thundering Swingmates (Polygram / Jazz Behind The Dikes, 1996)
- Out of a Dream, Ilse Huizinga (Own production, 1997)
- Voices Within, Ilse Huizinga (Own production, 1999)
- Erik van der Luijt - En Blanc Et Noir 2, Erik van der Luijt (Challenge / Daybreak, 1999)
- The Sweetest Sounds - Ilse Huizinga Sings the Songs of Richard Rodgers, Ilse Huizinga, (Challenge / Daybreak, 2001)
- Erik van der Luijt - En Blanc Et Noir 7, Erik van der Luijt (Challenge / Daybreak, 2002)
- Rainshine, Onno Voorhoeve (Own production, 2003)
- Easy to Idolize, Ilse Huizinga (Challenge / Daybreak, 2003)
- Express Yourself, Erik van der Luijt (Own production, 2004)
- Beyond Broadway, Ilse Huizinga (Maxanter Records, 2005)
- The Intimate Sessions - Volume 1, Ilse Huizinga, (Own production, 2006)
- 2015 - Here's to Maya Angelou, Ilse Huizinga (Challenge/Daybreak)
- 2022 - Do it again - The music of George Gershwin, Ilse Huizinga (Eigen beheer)
- 2022 - Air, Erik van der Luijt
- 2023 - Play, Erik van der Luijt
- 2024 - Happy-go-lucky, Erik van der Luijt

== Samples ==
Audio compilatie Erik van der Luijt op akoestische piano rond het jaar 2000

Django, trio, live - 2017

All blues, trio, live - 2017

Lament, trio, live - 2017

Saint James Infirmary - trio, live - 2017

Love walked in, Ilse Huizinga, live - 2022

A caged bird sings (lyrics: Maya Angelou - music: Erik van der Luijt), Ilse Huizinga
