= Robert Long (singer) =

Dutch musical artist (1943–2006)

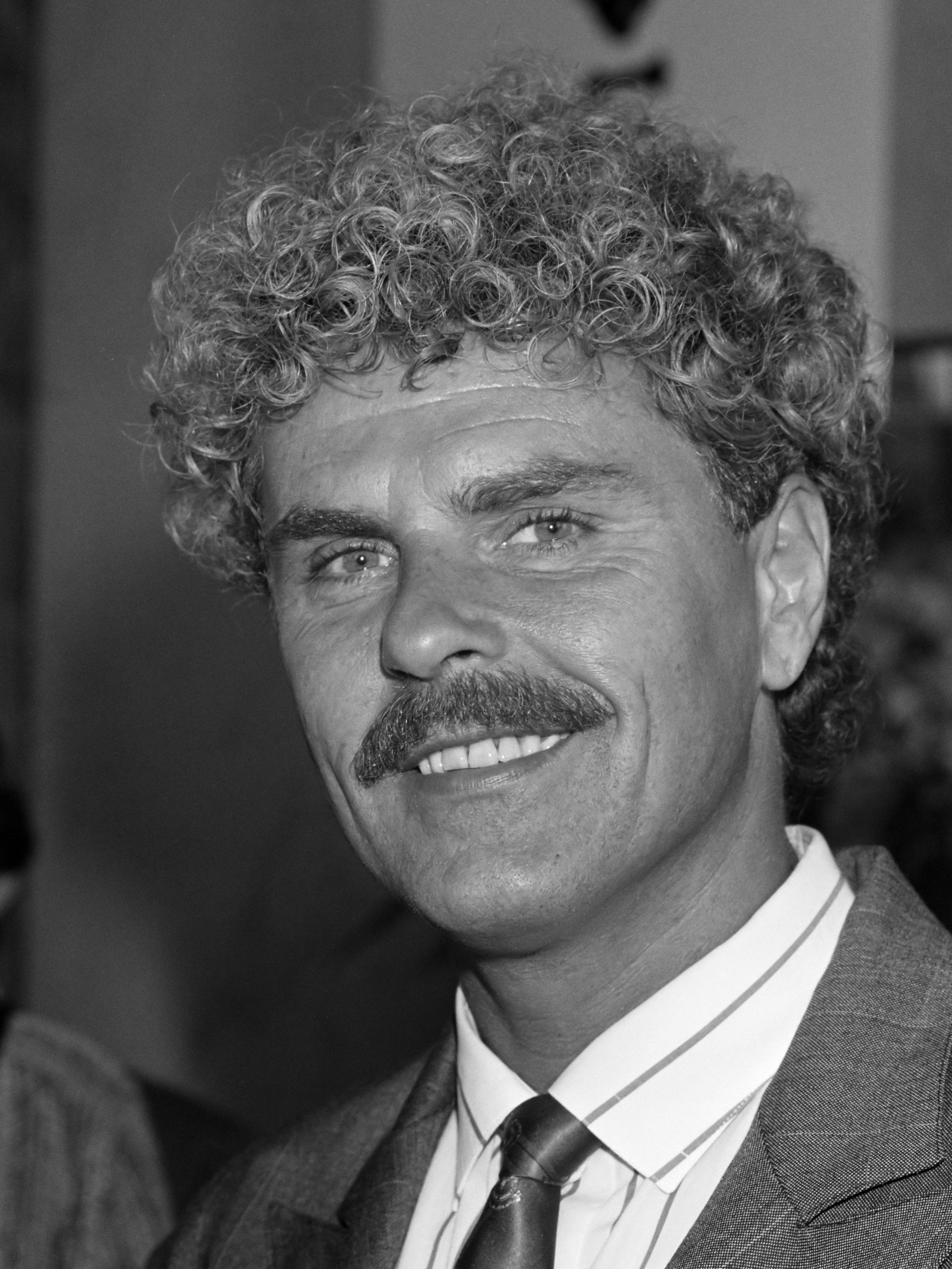
- Robert Long (1988)

Background information
- Also known as: Bob Revvel
- Born: Jan Gerrit Bob Arend Leverman; 22 October 1943; Utrecht, The Netherlands
- Died: 13 December 2006 (aged 63) Antwerp, Belgium
- Occupations: Singer, presenter, actor author/columnist
- Years active: 1957–2006
- Formerly of: The Yelping Jackals, Unit Gloria

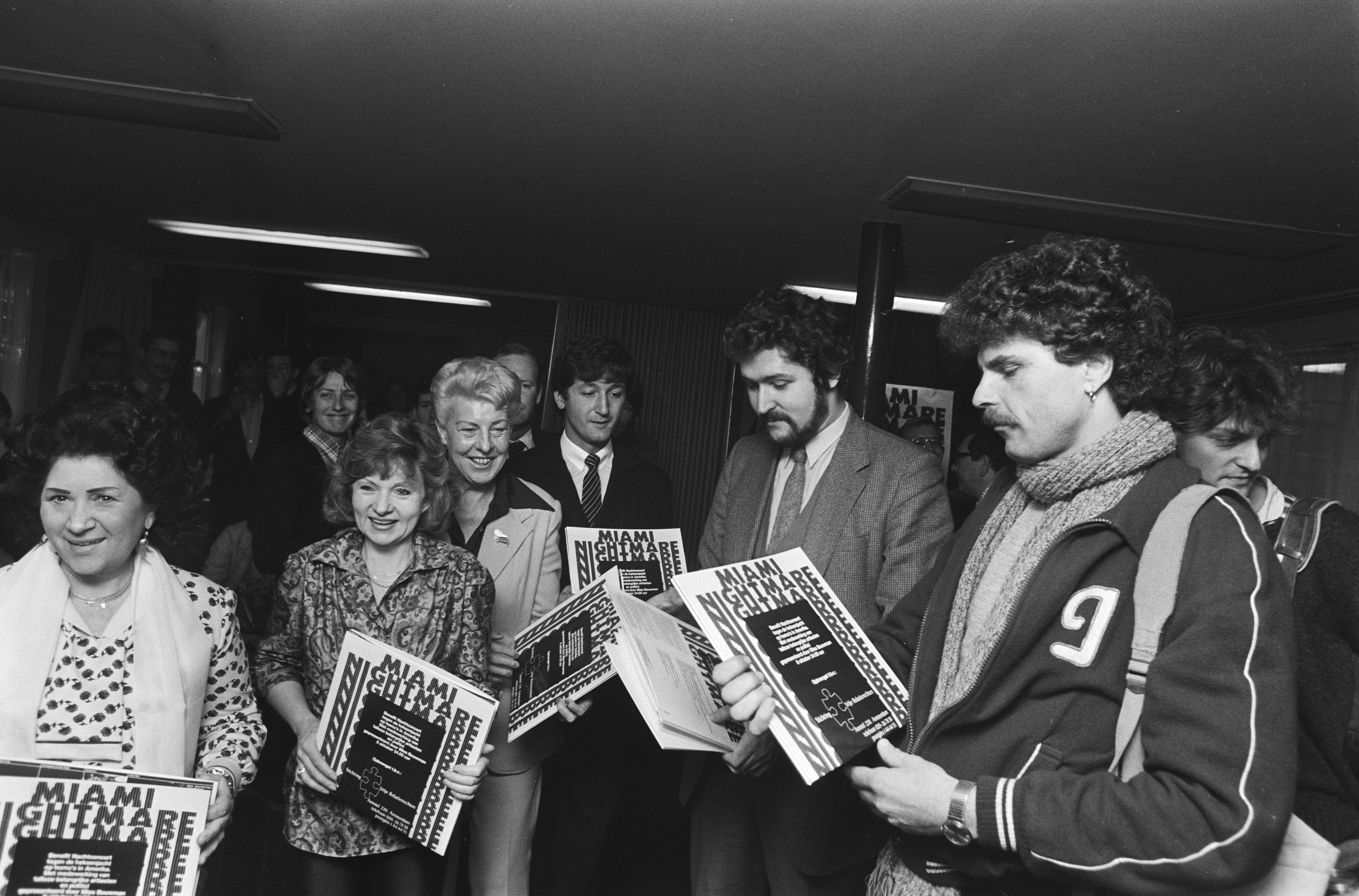
Presentation of the album Miami Nightmare (anti-Anita Bryant). F.l.t.r. Zangeres Zonder Naam, Sylvia de Leur, Pia Beck, Manfred Langer, Henk Krol & Robert Long (1980)

Robert Long (22 October 1943 in Utrecht as Jan Gerrit Bob Arend (Bob) Leverman – 13 December 2006 in Antwerp) was a Dutch singer and television presenter.

== Biography ==
Under the stage name "Bob Revel" he founded the band The Yelping Jackals in 1963. In 1967 he moved to another band, called Unit Gloria (at that time using the name Gloria). In 1971 he began to sing solo, under the name "Robert Long", a reference to his height. Only a year later he left Unit Gloria to concentrate on his solo career. He started singing in English, but soon after he also began to sing self-written songs in Dutch. His Dutch songs were critical of Dutch society and of American politics. Of his first Dutch album in 1974, Vroeger of Later (Sooner or Later) more than half a million records were sold and continued to be a best seller for 118 consecutive weeks. During this period the album reached the top of the charts three times. Also his second album Levenslang (Lifelong) scored well with sales of more than 300,000. In 1977 he was awarded the first of a total of six Edison Music Awards. During the 80s he scored a top 10 hit in the Netherlands with his song "Iedereen doet 't" (Everybody does it). Subsequent albums were also sold well.

In the late 80s Long appeared on television presenting a show called Mijn geheim (My secret). Despite this new career he received some negative reactions, although the show itself was successful. Soon afterwards he switched to another television network, presenting Tien voor taal (An A for spelling).

In 1986 Long began writing columns for the Dutch newspaper Algemeen Dagblad. A selection of these columns was released in a book in 1990 using the title Vandaag geen nieuws (No news today). During this period he presented the television show Fantastico. Together with Dimitri Frenkel Frank Long composed the Dutch musical Chekhov (based upon the life of the Russian writer Anton Chekhov), which was a big success in the Netherlands, but the German version in which Long also participated, was less popular.

In 1988 Long published his debut novel Wat wil je nou.

In 1998 a revealing book containing letters was released. Letters about life, death, love, sex, work and colleagues were made public by him and Cees van der Pluijm using the title Beste Robert, Waarde Cees.

On 8 September 2005 Long suffered a myocardial infarction and was treated with angioplasty. Later that year, on 6 December 2005 Long married his Belgian boyfriend and manager Kristof Rutsaert, 28 years his junior. The marriage ceremony was performed by fellow singer and actor Gerard Cox, a close friend of Long. On 4 December 2006 it was announced he was suffering from a terminal illness as he was admitted to hospital with cancer. Robert Long died on 13 December 2006 at 11 pm in a hospital in Antwerp at the age of 63.

== Discography ==
=== Albums ===
- 1974 Vroeger of later – NED: 2× Platinum
- 1975–1976 Scherts, satire, songs & ander snoepgoed (play from a theatre show with Robert Long, Jenny Arean, Jerôme Reehuis and Dimitri Frenkel Frank)
- 1977 Levenslang – NED: Platinum
- 1980 Homo Sapiens – NED: Gold
- 1984 Dag kleine jongen – NED: Platinum
- 1984 Liefste, mijn liefste
- 1986 Achter de horizon – NED: Platinum
- 1988 Hartstocht – NED: Gold
- 1988 Goud op zilver – NED: Gold
- 1989 Liedjes uit de krullentijd
- 1990 Het onherroepelijke FANTASTICO album
- 1992 Voor mijn vrienden – NED: Gold
- 1993 Het allerbeste van (subtitle: 50 jaar goed ter been en nog geen lintje) – NED: Gold
- 1994 In die dagen
- 1994 Uit liefde en respect – NED: Gold
- 1996 Nu
- 1997 Uit liefde en respect voor Gershwin
- 1999 Lang genoeg jong
- 2000 Vanavond tussen 8 en 11 LIVE
- 2002 Brand!
- 2006 'n Duivels Genoegen

=== Singles ===
- 1973 Let us try
- 1973 I believe in love
- 1984 Heeft een kind een toekomst
- 1986 Iedereen doet 't
- 1987 Geef ons vrede
- 1988 Ai lof joe so
- 1988 Vanmorgen vloog ze nog

== Theater ==
- 1974 – Robert Long (met Cobi Schreijer)
- 1975 – Scherts, satire, songs en ander snoepgoed (met Jenny Arean, Dimitri Frenkel Frank en Jérôme Reehuis)
- 1976 – En dat is twee (met Nelleke Burg)
- 1977 – Levenslang (met Ansje van Brandenberg)
- 1978 – Wat ieder meisje weten moet (met Dimitri Frenkel Frank)
- 1980 – Duidelijk zo!? (met Leen Jongewaard)
- 1982 – Tot hiertoe (heeft de Heere ons geholpen) (met Leen Jongewaard)
- 1983 – En het bleef nog lang onrustig in de stad (met Leen Jongewaard)
- 1978 – Swingpop (musical)
- 1995 – Nu (solo)
- 1999 – Lang genoeg jong
- 2000 – Cole Porter's songbook
- 2002 – Brand (solo)
- 2004 – Kerstconcert

== TV ==
- 1989–???? Disney's Adventures of the Gummi Bears – Singer Dutch language title song
