= Easy to Idolize =

Studio album by Ilse Huizinga
- Released: April 5, 2004
- Genre: Jazz
- Label: Challenge / Daybreak
- Producer: Erik van der Luijt

Ilse Huizinga chronology
The Sweetest Sounds (2001)	Easy to Idolize (2004)	Beyond Broadway (2005)

Easy to Idolize is a studio album by Ilse Huizinga.

== Track listing ==
1. "That's All" (Alan Brandt, Bob Haymes) – 3:08
2. "The Sound of Music" (Richard Rodgers, Oscar Hammerstein II) – 2:08
3. "I Only Have Eyes for Eyes" – 3:00
4. "Willow Weep for Me" (Ann Ronell) – 5:04
5. "The Thrill Is Gone" (Rick Darnell, Roy Hawkins) – 2:51
6. "Skylark" (Hoagy Carmichael, Johnny Mercer) – 2:48
7. "Easy to Love" (Cole Porter) – 3:48
8. "Some Day My Prince Will Come" (Frank Churchill, Larry Morey) – 2:37
9. "Time After Time" (Sammy Cahn, Jule Styne) – 3:59
10. "Isn't It Romantic?" (Rodgers, Lorenz Hart) – 2:21
11. "The Nearness of You" (Carmichael, Ned Washington) – 4:11
12. "I'm a Fool to Want You" (Joel Herron, Frank Sinatra, Jack Wolf) – 2:20
13. "When You Wish upon a Star" (Washington, Leigh Harline) – 2:58
14. "All the Things You Are" (Jerome Kern, Hammerstein) – 3:16
15. "Over the Rainbow" (Harold Arlen, Yip Harburg) – 3:20
16. "A Child Is Born" (Thad Jones, Alec Wilder) – 3:38
17. "I Love You" (Porter) – 1:54
18. "The Man I Love" (George Gershwin, Ira Gershwin) – 3:06
19. "What'll I Do" (Irving Berlin) – 1:33

== Personnel ==
- Ilse Huizinga - vocals
- Erik van der Luijt - grand piano, arranger
- Frans van der Hoeven - double bass
- Ben Schröder - drums
- Martijn van Iterson - guitar
