= The Intimate Sessions =

Studio album by Ilse Huizinga
- Released: 2006
- Recorded: 2006
- Genre: Jazz
- Label: Foreign Media
- Producer: Erik van der Luijt

Ilse Huizinga chronology
Beyond Broadway (2005)	The Intimate Sessions (2006)

The Intimate Sessions is an album by Ilse Huizinga with pianist Erik van der Luijt.

== Track listing ==
1. "Angel Eyes" (Earl Brent, Matt Dennis) – 2:45
2. "They Can't Take That Away from Me" (George Gershwin, Ira Gershwin) – 3:42
3. "Don't Explain" (Arthur Herzog, Jr.) – 3:11
4. "It Had to Be You" (Isham Jones, Gus Kahn) – 2:11
5. "That Old Devil Called Love" (Allan Roberts, Doris Fisher) – 2:23
6. "What a Difference a Day Made" (María Méndez Grever, Stanley Adams) – 3:53
7. "Cry Me a River" (Arthur Hamilton) – 3:51
8. "I Can't Give You Anything but Love, Baby" (Dorothy Fields, Jimmy McHugh) – 2:38
9. "Georgia on My Mind" (Hoagy Carmichael, Stuart Gorrell) – 3:42
10. "Fly Me to the Moon" (Bart Howard) – 2:39
11. "I've Got a Crush on You" (G. Gershwin, I. Gershwin) – 2:11
12. "Body and Soul" (Edward Heyman, Robert Sour, Frank Eyton, Johnny Green) – 2:00
13. "Our Love Is Here to Stay" (G. Gershwin, I. Gershwin) – 2:34
14. "Misty" (Erroll Garner) – 3:30
15. "Lover Man (Oh Where Can You Be?)" (Ram Ramirez, Jimmy Davis, James Sherman) – 3:02
16. "My Romance" (Richard Rodgers, Lorenz Hart) – 3:05
17. "Teach Me Tonight" (Gene De Paul, Sammy Cahn) – 3:11
18. "You Don't Know What Love Is" (De Paul, Don Raye) – 2:56
19. "Lullaby of Birdland" (George Shearing, B.Y. Foster) – 2:30
20. "The Man I Love" (G. Gershwin, I. Gershwin) – 4:21
21. "Can't We Be Friends?" (Paul James, Kay Swift) – 3:29
22. "I've Grown Accustomed to His Face" (Frederick Loewe, Alan Jay Lerner) – 2:59
23. "Embraceable You" (G. Gershwin, I. Gershwin) – 2:03

== Personnel ==
- Ilse Huizinga - vocals
- Erik van der Luijt - grand piano, arranger
