= Zangeres Zonder Naam =

Dutch singer

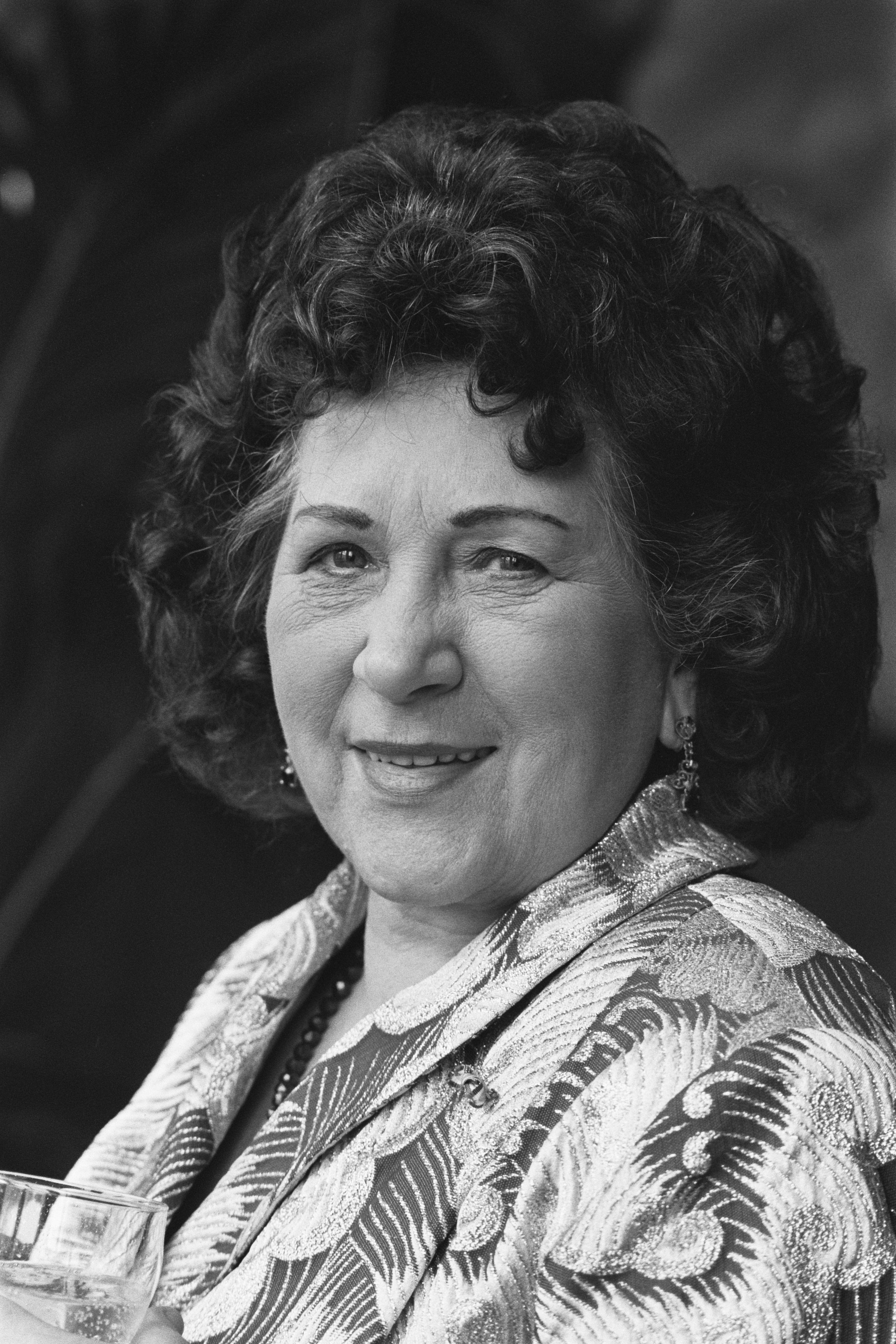
- Zangeres Zonder Naam in 1987

Background information
- Born: Maria Beij; 5 August 1919; Leiden, Netherlands
- Died: 23 October 1998 (aged 79) Horn, Netherlands
- Genres: Levenslied
- Occupation: Singer
- Instrument: Vocals
- Years active: 1957–1987

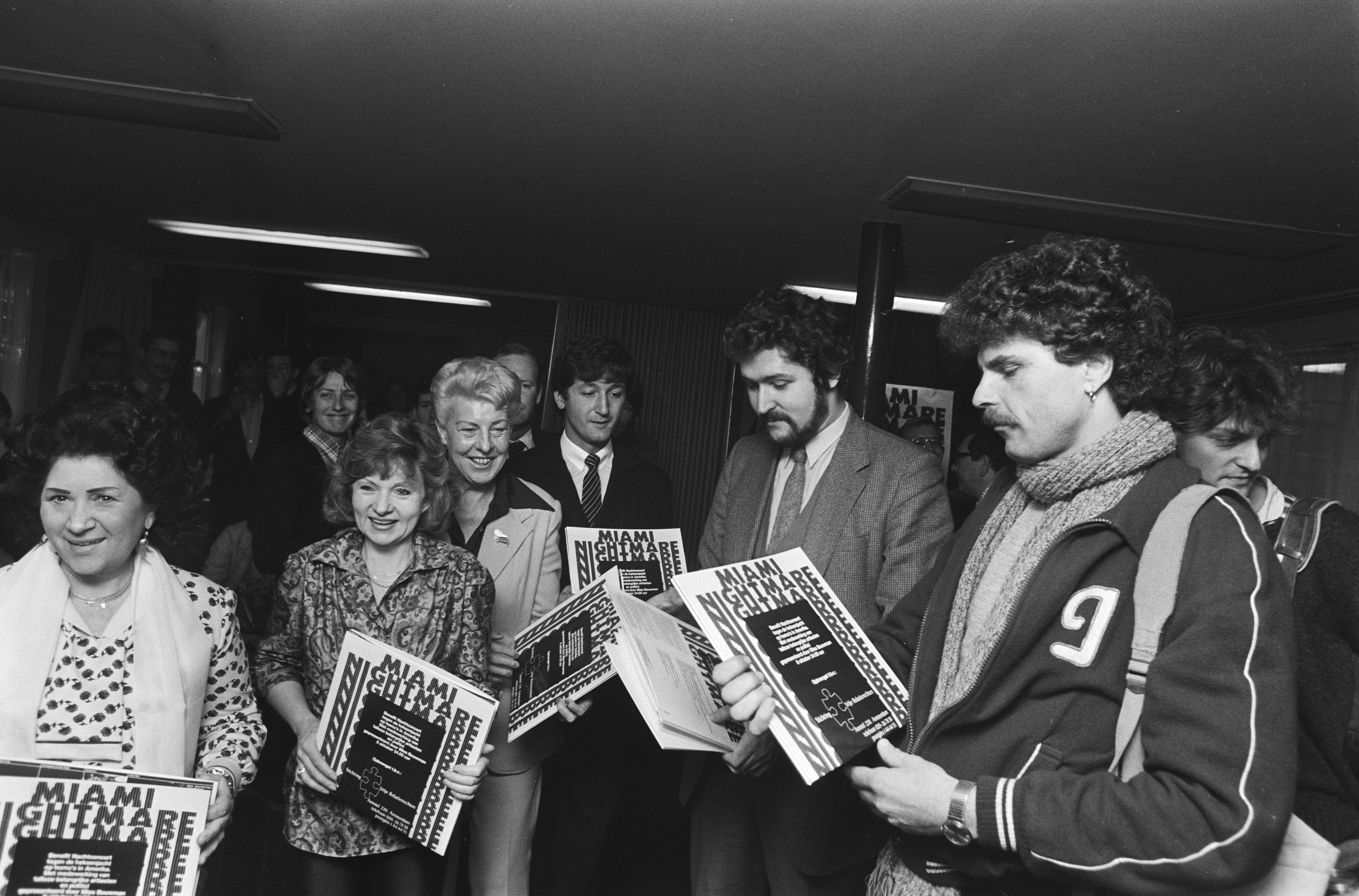
Presentation of the album Miami Nightmare. Left to right: Zangeres Zonder Naam, Sylvia de Leur, Pia Beck, Manfred Langer, Henk Krol & Robert Long (1980)

Maria "Mary" Servaes-Beij (Dutch pronunciation: [maˈrijaː sɛrˌvaːzˈbɛi]; née Beij; 5 August 1919 – 23 October 1998), performing under the stage name Zangeres Zonder Naam (Dutch for 'Singer Without a Name', pronounced [ˈzɑŋərə(s) ˈsɔndər ˈnaːm]), was a Dutch levenslied singer. She recorded almost 600 songs over the course of her career.

Servaes-Beij cared about the poor and disadvantaged, and often performed in prisons and hospitals. She was regularly in direct contact with her public, and received many emotional letters. Zangeres Zonder Naam was one of the artists who performed at the Dutch Miami Nightmare concert (Amsterdam, 8 October 1977), organized against Anita Bryant and her anti-gay movement; Zangeres Zonder Naam performed her own song "Luister Anita" ("Anita, Listen to Me"), in which she compared Bryant with Hitler.
