= Voices Within =

Studio album by Ilse Huizinga
- Released: February 1, 1999
- Recorded: November 12–17, 1998
- Genre: Jazz
- Length: 40:28
- Label: Own production
- Producer: Erik van der Luijt

Ilse Huizinga chronology
Out Of A Dream (1997)	Voices Within (1999)	The Sweetest Sounds (2001)

Professional ratings
Review scores
Source	Rating
Jazz Radio Berlin	5/5 stars
Cosmopolitan	5/5 stars
AVRO Radio	5/5 stars

Voices Within is a 1999 album by Dutch jazz singer Ilse Huizinga.

== Track listing ==
1. "Foolin' Myself" (Jack Lawrence, Peter Tinturin) – 3:21
2. "Some Other Time" (Leonard Bernstein, Betty Comden, Adolph Green) – 2:10
3. "I Should Care" (Sammy Cahn, Axel Stordahl, Paul Weston) – 6:10
4. "Better Than Anything" (David "Buck" Wheat, Bill Loughborough) – 3:41
5. "But Beautiful" (Jimmy Van Heusen, Johnny Burke) – 3:07
6. "Day by Day" (Cahn, Stordahl, Weston) – 4:10
7. "Only Trust Your Heart" (Benny Carter, Cahn) – 1:34
8. "Waltz for Debby" (Bill Evans) – 4:58
9. "Social Call" (Gigi Gryce, Jon Hendricks) – 3:18
10. "Quiet Now" (Denny Zeitlin) – 2:22
11. "Almost Like Being in Love" (Frederick Loewe, Alan Jay Lerner) – 5:35

== Personnel ==
- Ilse Huizinga – vocals
- Erik van der Luijt – piano, arranger
- Ruud Jacobs – double bass
- Frits Landesbergen – drums, vibes
- Ed Verhoeff – guitar
- Enno Spaanderman – soprano saxophone
