= Babe Egan =

American jazz musician (1897–1966)

- Born: Mary Florence Cecilia Egan; May 1, 1897; Seattle, Washington, United States
- Died: February 7, 1966 (aged 68) Glendale, California, United States
- Genres: Jazz
- Occupation: Bandleader
- Instrument: Violin
- Formerly of: Babe Egan and The Hollywood Redheads

Mary Florence Cecilia Egan (May 1, 1897 – February 7, 1966), who performed as Babe Egan, was an American jazz musician. She was a ragtime violinist and the band leader of the all-female vaudeville ensemble Babe Egan and The Hollywood Redheads.

== Biography ==
Egan was born on May 1, 1897, in Seattle, Washington, the youngest of seven children. She was the granddaughter of Irish immigrants to America.

In 1919, Egan moved to Hollywood, Los Angeles, California, with her widowed mother and a brother. She began her career in movie theater pit orchestras for silent films during the 1920s.

In 1924, Egan formed the all-female vaudeville ensemble Babe Egan and The Hollywood Redheads. Members of the ensemble were to be unmarried redheads as well as "collegiate, glamourous, and a little sexy, but "proper enough for family entertainment in America's heartland." They included Californian drummer, xylophonist and tap dancer Estelle Mae Dilthey, banjoist and guitarist Billie Farley and clarinettist Juanita Klein. Babe Egan and The Hollywood Redheads gave their first performance at Sacramento Fair and their first booking outside of Los Angeles was for three months in Honolulu, Hawaii. The ensemble were reviewed as "a whirlwind of mirth and rhythm."

Babe Egan and The Hollywood Redheads toured the vaudeville theater circuit across the United States and Canada from 1926, which included a performance with Ginger Rogers, meeting President Calvin Coolidge, and an encounter with a Ku Klux Klan rally, before performing in Europe in 1929 and 1930. They also performed on Broadway with Thelma White, the leader of another all-woman band, and on the RadioKeith-Orpheum (RKO) Pictures circuit. In 1929, Egan earned $50,000.

In 1933, Egan and her ensemble toured Europe again for a year, accompanied by a 16 piece band which included pianist Dorothy Sauter (known as Dot) and saxophonist Geraldine Stanley. A performance by Babe Egan and The Hollywood Redheads in Rotterdam, The Netherlands, inspired Dutch pianist Annie van 't Zelfde to take saxophone lessons and pursue a career performing jazz. Another performance was held at the Moulin Rouge cabaret in Paris, France.

Egan was bisexual and had a relationship with an actress who she met touring Europe.

Egan retired from professional life in the 1940s, but later reformed her band and toured in Australia for eight years, visiting Geelong, Adelaide, Mount Gambier, Warrnambool, Horsham, and Melbourne.

Egan lived her final years in the Rockhaven Sanitarium in Glendale, California, where she died of a stroke on February 7, 1966, aged 68. She was buried at Resurrection Cemetery in South San Gabriel, California.

Egan is the subject of the 2022 book Babe Egan and the Hollywood Redheads by Jeannie G. Pool.
