= Express Yourself (album) =

Studio album by Erik van der Luijt
- Released: May 2004
- Recorded: January 24–25, 2004
- Genre: Jazz
- Length: 55:17
- Label: Own production
- Producer: Erik van der Luijt

Erik van der Luijt chronology
Easy to Idolize (2003)	Express Yourself (2004)	Beyond Broadway (2005)

Professional ratings
Review scores
Source	Rating
Jazzreview.com	4/5 stars
Allaboutjazz.com	5/5 stars
Jazznow.com	5/5 stars

Express Yourself is a 2004 (see 2004 in music) album featuring a jazz trio, led by the Dutch jazz pianist and composer Erik van der Luijt.

== History ==
In April 2003 Erik van der Luijt decided to record a new album and within a month he had picked 15 jazz standards, most of them from the repertoire he had been playing with his trio for the past seven years. However, three days before the original recording date he changed his mind.

Van der Luijt quotes the fact that two members of the trio had recently married and all three had recently become a father as the drive behind the album. An increased sense of responsibility made them search more than ever for a distinctive style in order to draw more attention to themselves. Three days before the original recording date he decided that recording standards was not the best way to do this and began writing his own compositions.

The trio recorded them without rehearsal, but decided to wait until the new material had grown on them. In the following months Van der Luijt wrote forty compositions. These were all recorded (at Donk Studios in the Netherlands) to be able to analyse them in the best possible way.

At that point drummer Philip ten Bosch had to drop out. He had taken a full-time job to be able to support his family. This was a major setback to the project because his original style of drumming had become an important part of the trio's sound. He was replaced by Victor de Boo, who had briefly worked with Van der Luijt years earlier.

The album Express Yourself was hailed as "a masterpiece" in the press. "Erik van der Luijt knows his Oscar Peterson, Tommy Flanagan and Bill Evans and used their influences to create an exquisite mixture in which coquetry and adventure go hand-in-hand. At times he even comes close to Flanagan's masterpiece Jazz Poet. Those who know this monument from the piano discography, appreciate that there is hardly a bigger compliment." - Jeroen de Valk, Het Utrechts Nieuwsblad

== Track listing ==
1. "Corleone" – 5:21
2. "Keep On Walking" – 4:34
3. "Havana Blue" – 3:25
4. "Minor Changes" – 7:30
5. "Mucho Macho" – 5:46
6. "Nostalgia" – 4:51
7. "Me And My Guitar" – 4:10
8. "Ilse & Ellen" – 4:41
9. "Land of the Triplets" – 4:52
10. "Skyscape" – 4:24
11. "No Guts No Glory" – 5:41

All music composed by Erik van der Luijt

== Personnel ==
- Erik van der Luijt - piano
- Branko Teuwen - bass
- Victor de Boo - drums
