= Beyond Broadway =

Studio album by Ilse Huizinga
- Released: 2005
- Recorded: February 17–18, 2005
- Genre: Jazz
- Label: Maxanter Records / STS Digital
- Producer: Erik van der Luijt

Ilse Huizinga chronology
Easy to Idolize (2004)	Beyond Broadway (2005)	The Intimate Sessions - Volume 1 (2006)

Professional ratings
Review scores
Source	Rating
Marie Claire	link
Jazzflits	link

Beyond Broadway is a 2005 (see 2005 in music) album by Ilse Huizinga.

== Track listing ==
1. "I Loves You Porgy" (George Gershwin, Ira Gershwin, DuBose Heyward) – 3:59
2. "Wouldn't It Be Loverly" (Alan Jay Lerner, Frederick Loewe) – 3:31
3. "Someone To Watch Over Me" (G. Gershwin, I. Gershwin) – 3:21
4. "I Got Plenty of Nuttin'" (G. Gershwin, I. Gershwin) – 4:33
5. "Goodbye" (Gordon Jenkins) – 2:51
6. "Mad About the Boy" (Noël Coward) – 4:19
7. "On The Street Where You Live" (Lerner, Loewe) – 3:32
8. "I Could Have Danced All Night" (Lerner, Loewe) – 3:50
9. "I'll Close My Eyes" (Buddy Kaye, Billy Reid) – 3:01
10. "You and the Night and the Music" (Arthur Schwartz, Howard Dietz) – 3:58
11. "Ev'ry Time We Say Goodbye" (Cole Porter) – 3:27
12. "Manhattan" (Richard Rodgers, Lorenz Hart) – 3:59

== Credits ==
- Ilse Huizinga - vocals
- Erik van der Luijt - grand piano, arranger
- Branko Teuwen - double bass
- Victor de Boo - drums
- Enno Spaanderman - saxophone
