= Out of a Dream (Ilse Huizinga album) =

Studio album by Ilse Huizinga
- Released: 1997
- Recorded: January 14–15, 1997
- Genre: Jazz
- Label: Own Production
- Producer: Erik van der Luijt

Ilse Huizinga chronology
Out of a Dream (1997)	Voices Within (1999)

Professional ratings
Review scores
Source	Rating
Het Parool	5/5 stars
Algemeen Dagblad	5/5 stars
Trouw	5/5 stars

Out of a Dream is a 1997 album by Ilse Huizinga.

== Track listing ==
1. "The Old Country" (Reginald Lewis, Nat Adderley) – 6:35
2. "Up Jumped Springtime" (Freddie Hubbard, Abbey Lincoln) – 4:02
3. "You Stepped Out of a Dream" (Nacio Herb Brown, Gus Kahn) – 4:44
4. "My Heart Stood Still" (Richard Rodgers, Lorenz Hart) – 5:39
5. "I Hear Music" (Burton Lane, Frank Loesser) – 3:40
6. "I Got Lost In His Arms" (Irving Berlin) – 6:01
7. "I Didn't Know What Time It Was" (Rodgers, Hart) – 2:41
8. "Yesterdays" (Otto Harbach, Jerome Kern) – 3:58
9. "A Time For Love" (Johnny Mandel, Paul Francis Webster) – 4:14

== Personnel ==
Recorded at Studio 44, Monster, Netherlands.

- Ilse Huizinga - vocals
- Erik van der Luijt - grand piano, arranger
- Sven Schuster - double bass
- Steve Altenberg - drums, percussion
- Simon Rigter - tenor saxophone
- Jan van Duikeren - trumpet
