= Annie van 't Zelfde =

Dutch jazz musician (1913–2002)

- Born: 26 May 1913; Rotterdam, South Holland, The Netherlands
- Died: 18 June 2002 (aged 89) Rotterdam, South Holland, The Netherlands
- Genres: Jazz
- Instruments: Piano; Saxophone
- Formerly of: The Rosian Ladies; The Blue Jazz Ladies; The Swing Stars

Janna Johanna van 't Zelfde (26 May 1913 – 18 June 2002), better known as Annie van 't Zelfde, was a Dutch singer, pianist and saxophonist.

== Biography ==
Janna Johanna van 't Zelfde was born on Hendrik de Keyzerstraat in Rotterdam, South Holland, The Netherlands. Her father Adriaan Johannes van ’t Zelfde was an amateur accordionist.

Van ’t Zelfde studied at the Rotterdam Conservatory and worked as a packer at the French Bazaar as well as performing in cafes at the weekends to pay for her studies.

After hearing the music played by American jazz women's orchestra Babe Egan's Hollywood Redheads in 1929 in Rotterdam, van ’t Zelfde was inspired to take saxophone lessons with Jan Leeneman. From 1938, van ’t Zelfde performed with an all women jazz band The Rosian Ladies, led by jazz trumpeter Clara de Vries. She also performed with the Rosian Orchestra, conducted by Eddy Walis and The Blue Jazz Ladies, led by Russian orchestra leader Leo Selinsky. With The Blue Jazz Ladies she performed at Rotterdam's dance hall Pschorr.

On 26 January 1938, van 't Zelfde married drummer Jacob Kooijman. She continued to perform during her pregnancy, hiding her stomach behind her music stand. Their son, Jacobus Adrianus Johannes, was her only child and van 't Zelfde and Kooijman divorced in 1957.

During the German occupation of The Netherlands in World War II, van 't Zelfde continued playing as a member of the Nazi-sponsored art society Nederlandsche Kultuurkamer. She briefly had her own band, The Swing Stars, in 1939, but later faded into obscurity.

In June 1989, van 't Zelfde was interviewed on the television programme Sweet & Hot Music with Netty van Hoorn (about Dutch women's orchestras in the Interbellum) alongside trumpeter and singer Juultje Cambré. After the programme aired, van 't Zelfde was booked as the star player with conservatory students at the Hilton Hotel in Rotterdam and on the television show Sonja op Zondag with television personality Sonja Barend. In 1991, she was awarded a Golden Nutcracker by the Dutch Association of Musicians.

Van ’t Zelfde died on 18 June 2002 in Rotterdam, aged 89.
