= Louis de Vries =

Levie "Louis" de Vries
- Born: Levie de Vries; January 6, 1905; Groningen, Netherlands.
- Died: September 5, 1935 (aged 30) Zwolle, Netherlands.
- Genres: Jazz; swing
- Occupations: Jazz Musician; Trumpeter
- Instrument: Trumpet
- Years active: until 1935

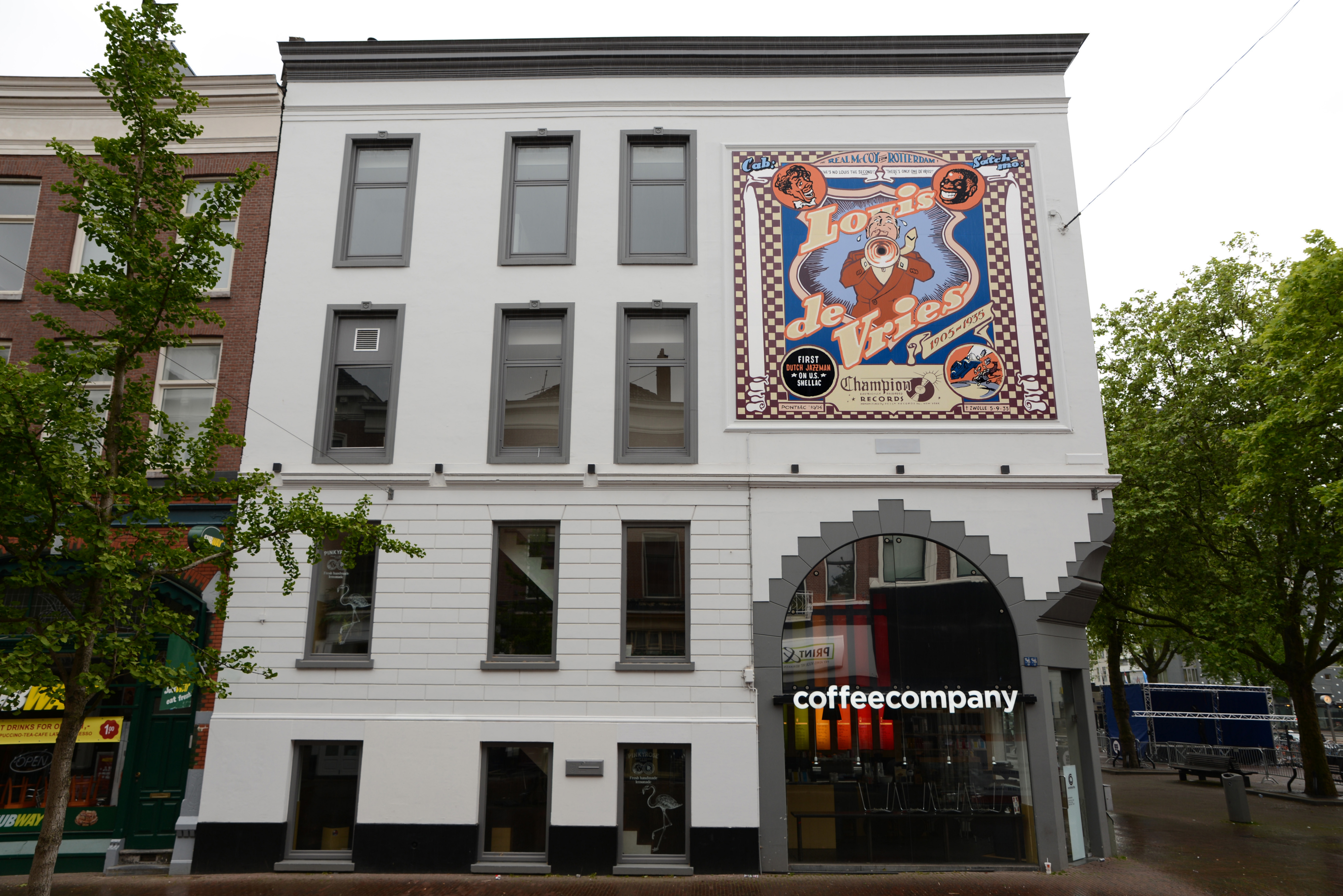
Wall painting by Leo Mineur, after a drawing by Peter Pontiac.

Levie "Louis" de Vries (January 5, 1905, Groningen – September 5, 1935, Zwolle) was a Dutch jazz trumpeter.

Louis de Vries was the eldest son of amateur trumpeter Arend de Vries. Just like his brothers Jacob (1906–1976) and Izaac and his sister Clara Johanna Suzanna, Louis was taught to play the trumpet by his father. He played as a teenager with the Tuschinski Theatre Orchestra. This was an orchestra which played music during silent films shown in the famous Tuschinski movie theater in Amsterdam until the Nazi occupation 1940–1945. Owner and managing director was Abraham Tuschinski.

In the second half of the 1920s Louis de Vries worked with the Excellos Five, Marek Weber and The Ramblers together with his brother Jacob. In 1930 he played with Ben Berlin and in 1931–1932 with Juan Llossas. From 1933 onwards he worked with his brother once more, almost up until his death. In 1935 he played with Valaida Snow in England. On his way to a concert in Groningen on 31 August 1935, he got involved in a car accident as a result of which he died on 5 September 1935.

His sister Clara Johanna Suzanna de Vries (Schoonhoven, 31 December 1915 – Auschwitz, 22 October 1942) was a well-known Dutch jazz trumpeter and from 1938 onwards until her death in 1942 the bandleader of an all-women jazz band, The Rosian Ladies.

After a visit to the Netherlands, Louis Armstrong remarked: "That Louis de Vries, he had a sister Clara with a ladies-band. Oh boy, she could play that horn".
