= Ilse Huizinga =

Dutch jazz singer (born 1966)

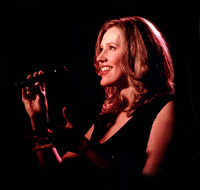
- Photo: Patricia Steur

Background information
- Born: 15 October 1966 (age 59); Beverwijk, Netherlands
- Genres: Jazz
- Occupation: Vocalist
- Website: www.ilsehuizinga.com

Ilse Huizinga (born 15 October 1966) is a Dutch jazz singer. She performs throughout Europe.

== Education ==
She lived in Australia for a year and attended the University of Amsterdam, where she received a degree in public administration. From 1993 to 1996 she studied music at the Conservatorium van Amsterdam and took master classes with Dianne Reeves and Margriet Eshuis.

== Career ==
Her informal debut was at Ronnie Scott's, and she has performed at Concertgebouw and Amsterdam's Bijlmerbajes prison. She has toured in Spain, Turkey, Switzerland and France, and regularly performs in the United Kingdom. A winner of the Schiedam Jazz Award, she has represented the Netherlands at the international jazz festival in Vienne, France. In 2011 Huizinga formed Vocal Jazz Trip, a tour operator based in Amsterdam that hosts vocal jazz master classes and jazz themed city breaks in Paris, Berlin, Rome, New York City, Prague, and London. She was invited to several concerts in China and performed with the Orchestra de Jazz do Algarve in Portugal.

KLM selected Huizinga's debut album Out of a Dream for its in-flight entertainment program. In 2001 Huizinga recorded an album devoted to the songs of Richard Rodgers entitled The Sweetest Sounds, which was voted Album of the Week on Dutch radio and is played on specialist jazz radio stations across Europe. Her album Here's to Maya Angelou is a celebration of the poetry of Maya Angelou, set to music by her husband Erik van der Luijt and received rave reviews from the international press.

Huizinga's most frequent collaboration is with her husband, the pianist, composer, and arranger Erik van der Luijt. Other collaborations include double bass player Sven Schuster, percussionist Frits Landesbergen, double bass player Ruud Jacobs, and guitarist Ed Verhoeff.

She teaches online courses through the Jazz Singers Academy.

== Discography ==
- Out of a Dream (1997)
- The Sweetest Sounds (Daybreak, 2001)
- Voices Within (2002)
- Easy to Idolize (Daybreak, 2003)
- Beyond Broadway (Maxanter, 2005)
- Here's to Maya Angelou (Daybreak, 2006)
- The Intimate Sessions with Erik van der Luijt (Foreign Media Group, 2006)
- Do It Again (Sena, 2022)
