= Poldervokaal =

Dutch vocal ensemble

Poldervokaal is a vocal ensemble that takes its name after the (Beemster) polder in North Holland, Netherlands. Poldervokaal was created in 1986, and has been led by Maria Rondèl, an international vocal teacher, who brought together a group of her pupils.

All 14 members of the ensemble are highly trained singers, and the group strives to perform at a semi-professional level. All performance are done by heart, and without a director. The ensemble performs in all possible combinations, from solo to solo quartets to full SSAATTBB settings. The repertoire consists of all vocal music through the ages, from Renaissance madrigals and motets to present-day close harmony compositions.

In 1997, some highlights of the repertoire were recorded in a first CD, followed in 2003 by the CD Momenten with a collection of Christmas songs, which was very well received and has sold out.

Poldervokaal has received recognition from well-known Dutch publications, such as the national newspaper De Volkskrant, June 4, 2005: "The Domine Deus Agnus Dei drifted serenely out of the door over the meadows", and numerous local newspapers: "Poldervokaal sings wonderfully beautifully" (Noordhollands Dagblad, December 17, 2005), "Moved to tears by performance of Poldervokaal" (Het Witte Weekblad, edition 56, 2005).
