= Miners of Muzo =

Dutch rock band

- Origin: Tilburg, Netherlands
- Genres: Rock
- Years active: 1983–present
- Members: Léon Lemmen; Marc Lemmen; Hans Vroom; Stefan Sterrenberg
- Website: Official Website

Miners of Muzo are a Dutch-based rock band that started out in 1983, founded in the city of Tilburg by singer and songwriter Leon Lemmen.

== History ==
The band name was picked out of a short list of names without further meaning (It was also the name of a BBC documentary on the outlaw emerald miners of the Colombian city Muzo). Pretty much bored of what was going on musically back then, they chose to seek the gut feeling of rock music again. Anti- shoe gazing rock music with lots of electric guitar and organ. On the first album The Birthday Party influences are still evident, but as from the second album APOGEE, the style becomes more melodic and very 60's influenced. In 10 years time 7 albums and 5 singles were released and numerous gigs and tours through the Netherlands, Belgium, Germany, Switzerland and especially France had followed. They were also the first Dutch rock band to play at SXSW in Austin Texas in 1990.

At the end of the 90s the Miners paused. Feeling it was time for a break. Keyboard player Dan was no longer in the band and lives in Amsterdam. Marc had been playing with American singer Pat Mears but returned to the band in 95. For a while they called themselves Funrazor to see if it was possible to start with a clean slate without any legacy. But then after 2 years they returned to the original name again and started to build a recording studio in their own rehearsal garage. When the studio became better equipped new songs were recorded and the songs from those years are captured in a double CD "Love & Life part II" which is only available as a download on their website.

Hans left the country shortly after that and has a new life as a farmer in France. Since 2010 The Miners started playing live again occasionally and they were joined by guitarist Wannes Rombouts and drummer Kasper Dam. The long-awaited new album: "Really...is that a fact" has been self-released as a promo in January 2013.

Early December 2013 original drummer GJ suffered a fatal heart attack and died sadly. Due to lack of time and other obligations, Wannes Rombouts is no longer active with the Miners. At the same time Miners of Muzo is playing again as HOLY JOE & the ALCOHOLITES, an alter ego band about Joe the Rock'n Roll Bishop. A band which only plays 60s garage songs, mainly covers (something they always have been doing alongside the Miners material). Lead guitar is played by 19 year old Frankie Lamberts aka Frankie Fuzz.

In 2017 Hans Vroom returned to pick up the guitar again. In the summer of 2017 The Miners of Muzo (reunited with Hans on guitar) played a few concerts in the South of France. In 2018 The Miners played at The Go Wild festival and at the Down at the Nightclub festival.

In 2017 the Miners of Muzo resumed recording new material. In 2017 The Miners of Muzo appeared on the compilation album Down at the Nightclub vol.1 and released two CDs, Really is that a Fact and Love & Life Part II. In 2018 The Miners appeared on Down at the Nightclub vol.2 where they provided the vinyl only bonus title track "Down at the Nightclub".

In 2022 guitarist Hans appeared as a participant of the Dutch RTL 4 show "B&B vol Liefde" where he, as a single guy with a B&B abroad, has to look for and find a new love, a new partner (Similar to Farmer Wants a Wife, or the French L’Amour est dans le pré, but then only with single B&B owners).

The Miners of Muzo made an appearance in episode 18 and played live on the village square of Dégangac, where Hans lives and has his B&B and his equestrian center Du Passe Temps. Hence Miners of Muzo played more shows in 2022 both in the Netherlands and France and released a new 7” single on vinyl together with Parisian friends, the band #Whodunit. This was a split single with Jaques Dutronc covers by both bands. Miners of Muzo played "On nous cache tout, on nous dit rien" and Whodunit "Les Playboys".

In the fall of 2023, Kasper announced that he would be leaving the Miners, so he could focus more on other things and making a different kind of music. A quick replacement was found in drummer Stefan Sterrenberg, a Tilburg locallooking for a new challenge, a rock band . He is also a good vocalist as well.

In 2024 Miners of Muzo are working an rehearsing brand new material for their the 10th official album and a new single.

In March 2025 a new song was released on a compilation album of Closer records, called Eyes on You 3. The song is called "Don't Let Go" a cover version of the R&B song from all girl, US vocal band: En Vogue.

== Current members ==
- Leon Lemmen – vocals/guitars
- Marc Lemmen – Bass guitar
- Hans Vroom – Guitar
- Stefan Sterrenberg – Drums

== Discography ==
- In Surf of Fish — Eksakt Records [Mini LP] 1983
- Apogee — Eksakt Records –LP 1984
- Hey Gypsy Woman — Eksakt Records [7"] 1984
- Beauty is Pain — Eksakt Records, G.M.G France, Music Box Greece [LP] 1986
- Dig Deep For... — Eksakt Records, Ediesta UK [LP] 1987
- Make My Day — Eksakt Records, Music Maniac Germany [LP] 1988
- Sandman — Eksakt Records [7"] 1988
- Make My Day (has 6 bonus tracks from "Beauty is Pain") Music Maniac Germany [CD] 1989
- Hey Gypsy Woman — Spliff France [7"] 1989
- Are You There — Silenz/Columbus [Mini CD/MC] 1990
- Love & Live Storybook — Silenz [LP/MC/CD] 1990
- No One — Silenz [7"] 1990
- Robin & Mary Ann — Silenz [CD single] 1990
- Beauty Queen of Beach Rock City — Silenz [CD single]1990
- About Time — (Anthology) Music Maniac Germany [CD] 1993
- Love & Life part II (diggin' the Future) 1997-2007 — Double album, only available as a download from minersofmuzo.com [MP3] 2011
- Really... is that a Fact? — MoM Productions self-release promo [CD] 2012-2013
- Love & Life part II official release; Down at the Nightclub Records [2CD] 2017
- Really... is that a Fact? official release; Down at the Nightclub Records [CD] 2017
- Down at the Nightclub vol.1 - 2 songs Down at the Nightclub Records [12" Vinyl] 2017
- Down at the Nightclub vol.2 Down at the Nightclub vol.2 - vinyl bonus track "Down at the Nightclub" Down at the Nightclub Records [12" Vinyl] 2018
- On Nous Cache Tout, On Nous Dit Rien - Down at the Nightclub Records [7" vinyl] 2022

== Line-ups ==
The first line up in the early beginning

- Leon Lemmen— Lead vocals and bass guitar
- Hans Vroom— Lead guitar and vocals
- Daan Appels— Saxophone, percussion, keyboards and vocals
- Ruud Diederiks— Drums
- Monique van Dusseldorp— Keyboards

Second line up (first album In Surf of Fish )

- Leon Lemmen— Lead vocals, bass guitar, guitar
- Hans Vroom— Lead guitar and vocals
- Daan Appels— Keyboards, Saxophone, percussion, and vocals
- Marc Van Gennip— Drums

Third line up (second album APOGEE)

- Leon Lemmen— Lead vocals, bass guitar, guitar
- Hans Vroom— Lead guitar and vocals
- Daan Appels— Keyboards, Saxophone, percussion, and vocals
- Gert Jan Smits— Drums

Fourth line up (since 3rd album Beauty is Pain)

- Leon Lemmen— Lead vocals, guitar
- Hans Vroom— Lead guitar and vocals
- Daan Appels— Keyboards, and vocals
- Gert Jan Smits— Drums
- Marc Lemmen— Bass guitar

Fifth line up

- Leon Lemmen— Lead vocals, guitar
- Wannes Rombouts— Lead guitar and vocals
- Gert Jan Smits— Drums
- Marc Lemmen— Bass guitar

Sixth line up

- Leon Lemmen— Lead vocals, guitar
- Wannes Rombouts— Lead guitar and vocals
- Kasper Dam— Drums
- Marc Lemmen— Bass guitar

Seventh line up

- Leon Lemmen— Lead vocals, guitar
- Hans Vrooms— Lead guitar and vocals
- Kasper Dam— Drums
- Marc Lemmen— Bass guitar

Eight line up

- Leon Lemmen— Lead vocals, guitar
- Hans Vrooms— Lead guitar and vocals
- Stefan Sterrenberg— Drums
- Marc Lemmen— Bass guitar
