= Juultje Cambré =

Dutch trumpeter and singer (1914–1990)

- Born: 21 October 1914; Amsterdam, The Netherlands
- Died: 19 April 1990 (aged 75) Rotterdam, The Netherlands
- Genres: Jazz
- Instrument: Trumpet
- Formerly of: Rosian Orchestra; Clara de Vries and the Jazz Ladies
- Spouse: Johan Jurjen van Laere (m. 1942, div. 1943)

Juliana Cambré (21 October 1914 – 19 April 1990), better known as Juultje Cambré, was a Dutch singer, jazz trumpeter and women's orchestra leader.

== Biography ==
Cambré's parents, shoemaker Augustinus Juus Cambré and Maria Coleta Cambré (née van Noten), fled from Herentals near Antwerp in Belgium to Amsterdam in The Netherlands after the German Imperial Army invaded Belgium in August 1914. She was born at Amsterdam's Wilhelmina Gasthuis [nl] on 21 October 1914.

Cambré learned to play the trumpet from her grandfather. In 1935, Cambré played at the Brussels International Exposition. In February 1936 Cambré performed at Hotel de Lindeboom in Tilburg, then for a month at Heck's Lunchroom on Rembrandtplein in Amsterdam. In 1939, she was performing with the Rosian Orchestra. A clip of Cambré and Clara de Vries performing on Omroepvereniging VARA radio station in 1938 survives.

During the German occupation of The Netherlands in World War II, Cambré continued playing as a member of the Nazi-sponsored art society Nederlandsche Kultuurkamer, as performing was her only source of income, but refused to give the Hitler salute on stage. Cambré formed her own women's ensemble in 1941 and was engaged to perform at Heck's in Amsterdam with radio singer Elly Rexon [nl].

On 10 September 1942, Cambré married Johan Jurjen van Laere in Amsterdam, but the marriage ended in divorce on 15 May 1943.

Cambré retired from performing in 1955.

In June 1989, Cambré was interviewed on the television programme Sweet & Hot Music with Netty van Hoorn (about Dutch women's orchestras in the Interbellum) alongside pianist and saxophonist Annie van 't Zelfde.

Cambré died on 19 April 1990 in Rotterdam, The Netherlands, aged 75.
