= USS Heyliger =

John C. Butler-class destroyer in the U.S. navy

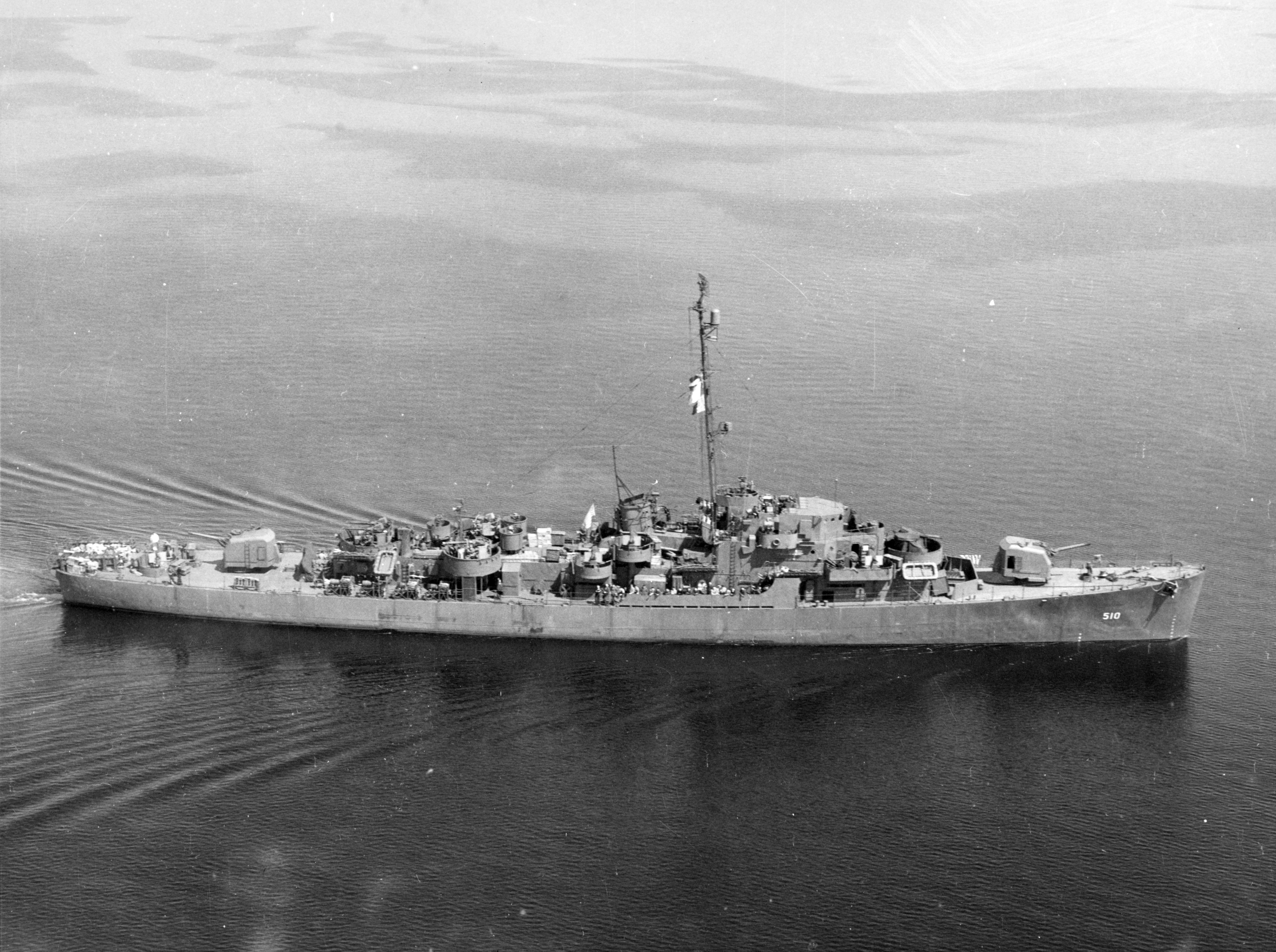

History

United States
- Laid down: 27 April 1944
- Launched: 6 August 1944
- Commissioned: 24 March 1945
- Decommissioned: 20 June 1946
- In service: 28 March 1951
- Out of service: 2 January 1958
- Stricken: 1 May 1966
- Fate: Sunk as target in 1969

General characteristics
- Displacement: 1,350 long tons (1,372 t)
- Length: 306 ft (93 m) (oa)
- Beam: 36 ft 10 in (11.23 m)
- Draught: 13 ft 4 in (4.06 m) (max)
- Propulsion: 2 boilers, 2 geared steam turbines, 12,000 shp, 2 screws
- Speed: 24 knots
- Range: 6,000 nm @ 12 knots
- Complement: 14 officers, 201 enlisted
- Armament: 2-5 in (130 mm), 4 (2×2) 40 mmAA, 10-20 mm AA, 3-21 inch (533 mm) TT, 1 Hedgehog, 8 DCT's, 2 DC tracks

USS Heyliger (DE-510) was a John C. Butler-class destroyer escort acquired by the U.S. Navy during World War II. The primary purpose of the destroyer escort was to escort and protect ships in convoy, in addition to other tasks as assigned, such as patrol or radar picket.

Heyliger (DE-510) was named in honor of George Heyliger who was awarded the Navy Cross for his brave actions during an overwhelming attack by the enemy during the Guadalcanal Campaign.

== Namesake ==
George Heyliger was born 8 May 1919 in Boston, Massachusetts. He was the son of George Heyliger Sr. and Augusta Weissent. He enlisted in the United States Marine Corps on 3 February 1942. Private First Class Heyliger was serving with the 1st Marine Division during the Guadalcanal Campaign.

On 9 October 1942, his platoon's position was attacked by approximately 150 Japanese. The fighting swiftly changed from automatic weapons to bayonets and then hand-to-hand combat. He refused to be dislodged from his position by the enemy and was killed at his post. For his actions he was posthumously awarded the Navy Cross.

== History ==
She was launched 6 August 1944 by the Federal Shipbuilding & Drydock Co., Kearny, New Jersey; sponsored by Mrs. Augusta Foss, mother of Private First Class Heyliger; and commissioned at New York 24 March 1945.

=== World War II Pacific Theatre operations ===
After shakedown in the Caribbean, Heyliger sailed from Norfolk, Virginia, for the Pacific Ocean 25 May, reaching Pearl Harbor via the Panama Canal and San Diego, California, 19 June. The new destroyer-escort spent 6 weeks at Pearl for various training exercises and then departed for Guam 14 August, the day before Japan agreed to unconditional surrender.

=== End-of-war operations ===
Heyliger reached Guam 30 August and then continued on to Rota Island in the Marianas, where. Colonel H. H. Stent, USMC, accepted the surrender of the Japanese garrison 2 September. From 19 September to 21 October Heyliger searched through the Carolines to find Allied survivors and Japanese soldiers, as well as examining conditions in the islands. After a stint of patrol and air-sea rescue operations, Heyliger returned to the States 22 January 1946 and decommissioned at Green Cove Springs, Florida, 20 June.

=== Reactivation during Korean War ===
Heyliger recommissioned at Green Cove Springs 28 March 1951 and reported to her new home port, Brooklyn, New York. From there she participated in tactical exercises and fleet maneuvers along the American coast and in Caribbean waters. Antisubmarine warfare, her main mission, took Heyliger to European waters 13 June-10 July 1953 and again 17 June-15 July 1955. During my time as the Disbursing Clerk on Heyliger, her duty was to provide opportunity for Navy reservists to perform their required active duty for training in a sea-going environment. She went out-bound for 2 weeks, spent a week-end visiting a port (often Caribbean, sometimes Canada) and returned to Brooklyn the next week. The crew was 5 officers and about 100 enlisted with anywhere from 20 to 40 or so reservists along on the cruise. The June–July cruise permitted reservists the opportunity to meet their requirements for two fiscal years with one cruise. There was also a 6-week refresher training cruise operating mostly out of Guantanamo Bay for just the regular crew. There were five other DEs doing the same thing out of Brooklyn including Osberg, Kyne and Allen. More of the same operations were carried out from other ports.

== Final decommissioning ==
She decommissioned and was placed in reserve at Bayonne, New Jersey, 2 January 1958 and later transferred to Philadelphia, Pennsylvania. Heyliger was struck from the Navy List 1 May 1966 and sunk as a target in 1969 by the Atlantic Fleet.
