= Piter Wilkens =

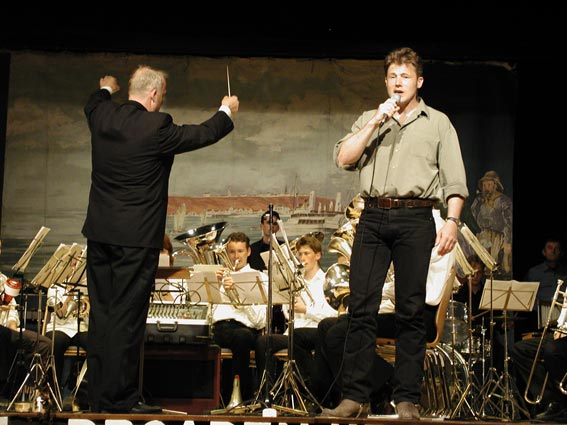
Piter Wilkens, 2001

Piter Wilkens (born August 26, 1959 in Leeuwarden, Netherlands) is a singer, guitarist, composer, lyricist, and producer who performs mainly in his native West Frisian language. His performances are often solo, but he also performs with a back up band.

His repertoire is a traditional ballad and folk styles mixed with rock and pop, typically penned himself.

Wilkens performed with the pioneering Frisian pop band Okke Hel from 1979 until 1986, when he went solo. Besides his touring in the Netherlands, he has toured in the United States, Poland, Lithuania, Germany, Belgium, Austria, France, and Ireland. He has shared a stage with many other performers, including De Kast, Rients Gratama, Gé Reinders and the Noord Nederlands Orkest, as well as collaborating successfully with the Friese Jeugd Brass Band in 2004.

== Discography ==
- Butter, Bread and Green Tsis, CD (1990) - Bartele Productions 001
- Sjongerbloed, 1993 - Achterdyk Produksjes - SKIIF 001
- Timmermantsjoender, 1996 - Achterdyk Produksjes - SKIIF 002
- Knoopkes, 1997 - Achterdyk Produksjes - SKIIF 003
- it Pompeblêdhert, CD-single 1998 - Pink Records - PRCS 98005
- De Bearenburch is myn Sjirurch, CD single 1999 - Achterdyk Produksjes/Marista - SKIIF 004/MCD 8480
- Nocht & Wilkens, CD 2000 - Achterdyk Produksjes/Marista - SKIIF 005/MCD 5800
- Greideroas (with the Fryske Jeugd Brassband), CD 2001 - Achterdyk Produksjes - SKIIF 006
- Romtefyts, CD 2002 - Achterdyk Produksjes - SKIIF 008
- Der tuskenút, CD 2004 - Achterdyk Produksjes - Trûb 004 (with Jaap Louwes, Gurbe Douwstra and Doede Veeman)
- Brutsen snaren, CD 2005 - Achterdyk Produksjes - SKIIF 009
- It fûgeltsje yn myn gitaar, CD 2006 - Achterdyk Produksjes - SKIIF 010
- Skodzje foar it brûken - De Rayonhaden, 1995 - Frigram - FGCD541
- Trochstrings & ko - Ferskate fryske artysten, 1998 - Maura Music - MM 039
- Simmertime 1 - De Kast, Rients Gratama, Maaike Schuurmans en Piter Wilkens Proacts - pro cd 2010
- Simmertime 2 - De Kast, Rients Gratama, Maaike Schuurmans en Piter Wilkens Proacts - pro cd 2012
