= Vast Countenance =

Dutch folk-rock band

- Origin: Volendam, Netherlands
- Genres: Folk rock
- Years active: 1999–present
- Labels: CD Baby - Portland, Oregon
- Website: vastcountenance.nl

Vast Countenance is a folk rock band from Volendam, the Netherlands, founded in 1999. Vast Countenance toured the Netherlands and the United States. Its albums have been released in several countries.

== Biography ==
=== Start off ===
Vast Countenance was formed in 1999 to bring forth its music. Almost all members originate from the cover band Sister Ray (founded on 31 December 1996) – Cor Bond and Simon Tol didn't come along. Members continue playing in Sister Ray as well, though sometimes during the same appearance.

The name of the band was invented by the first lead singer, Mario Reurs. For the group members, it is an English translation without an additional meaning. They don't link it to Kabbalah, of which they initially had never heard (i.e., in Kabbalah, 'Vast Countenance' is the first sephira). The song Sister Ray by Velvet Underground has been the inspiration for the name of their other band.

Still quite at the beginning, Johan Molenaar replaced Reurs as the lead singer of the band. In 2004, Vast Countenance released its first album, a demo version that carries the name of the band and contains nine of its compositions. The CD was well received, and the genre was at that time described by the newspaper Noord Hollands Dagblad as "Beatle-style pop with a whiff of rock 'n' roll.

=== Influences and music style ===
Vast Countenance's music genre has changed slightly over time. It has been qualified by some as part-sung alternative rock and Britpop, as well as a mixture between indie rock and folk by others. Meanwhile, it has developed into rock 'n' folk. It combines influences from the 1960s with a contemporary sound, and finds inspiration in the music of The Beatles, Bob Dylan, Crosby, Stills, Nash & Young, and Velvet Underground, as well as from songwriters like Tim Buckley and Neil Young.

The band only produces self-written music. Most songs originate from a guitar chord composition by Molenaar, based on which the group writes its songs together. The part-sung choirs of the first two albums have been arranged by Nico Tol (Stein). During studio sessions afterward, the songs are shaped into their final settings.

=== Reception ===
In 2006, the music group released its album As We Please in the Netherlands, the United States, and Japan. The album contained seven newly written songs and three makeovers of the first album, which were described by the Dutch music magazine LiveXS as "a fresh sounding melody machine." The song Clay was released as a single, too. Guest appearances on the album were from Peter Bien (trumpet) and Jozef Veerman (keyboards).

OOR Magazine reviewed the band in 2007 as follows: "From the region of Waterland, surprisingly Dutch talent comes sailing along ... 'We're all jugglers juggling with the endless possibilities of life' is just one of the simple, but pretty formed sentences on the album. The pliant, sunny melodies and beautiful part-sung choirs link up seamlessly with the texts. Extra little points deserve the strong choruses, unexpected transitions, and the special singing. Pop as pop is meant to be." OOR was critical of the recording quality of the demo version.

=== Seattle and San Francisco ===
In 2008, As We Please received attention from the American music promoter Michael Sudden. He introduced the band to some radio stations around Seattle, which resulted in airplay and reviews in magazines. In November of the same year, the band traveled along the West Coast for two weeks, where it performed in two clubs in Seattle, and finished its tour with street performances in San Francisco. It received positive reviews, such as "Dutch group Vast Countenance gives '60s rock a breathtaking makeover."

=== 2010s ===
In 2011, the music group released its album Elephant Child. As a result of the joining of violinist Anne Veerman to the band, the genre can be defined as rock 'n' folk. In its review, the Noord Hollands Dagblad regards the song Not A Bad Moment as world-class, with further comments like "One by one strong songs ... inimitable melody lines ... really brilliant."

Ten songs of Vast Countenance reached the Volendammer Top 1000, an all-time list that was compiled in 2013 by the listeners of 17 regional radio and television stations.

Cor Schilder (Pan), drummer and one of the singers in the band, was killed on 17 July 2014, when Malaysia Airlines Flight 17 was shot down above Ukraine.

== Members ==
The following lists show permanent members. The group invites guest musicians regularly as well.

Current members

- Johan Molenaar – bass guitar, vocals
- Anne Veerman – violin
- Jack Tuyp (Kip) – guitar
- Pascal Voorn – guitar, vocals
- Christiaan Veerman – keyboards, piano

Past members

- Mario Reurs – vocals 1999
- Nico Tol (Stein) – guitar, vocals 1999–2007
- Cor Schilder (Pan) – drums, vocals (1999–2014; died 2014)

== Discography ==
=== Albums ===
- 2004: Vast Countenance (demo)
- 2006: As We Please
- 2011: Elephant Child
- 2015: With Muffled Drum

=== Dvd ===
- 2009: Love Acoustic
