= Clara de Vries =

Dutch jazz trumpeter (1915–1942)

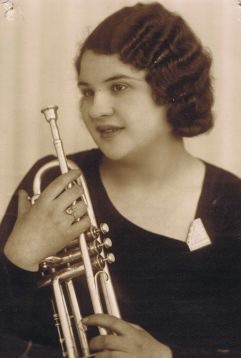

Background information
- Born: 31 December 1915; Schoonhoven, South Holland, Kingdom of the Netherlands
- Died: 22 October 1942 (aged 26) Auschwitz Birkenau, German Nazi Concentration and Extermination Camp, German-occupied Poland
- Genres: Jazz
- Occupations: Musician and bandleader
- Instrument: Trumpet
- Formerly of: Blue Jazz Ladies; Schirmann Jazz Girls; Clara de Vries and the Jazz Ladies; The Rosian Ladies; The Swinging Rascals; Plus Fours
- Spouse: Willy Schobben (m. 1936)

Clara Johanna Suzanna de Vries (31 December 1915 – 22 October 1942) was a Dutch jazz trumpeter and bandleader. She was murdered by Nazis at Auschwitz Birkenau during World War II.

== Family ==
De Vries was born on 31 December 1915 in Schoonhoven, South Holland, Kingdom of the Netherlands, into a Jewish family. Her parents were Arend de Vries (1882–1942) and Betje de Vries (née Bollegraaf, 1878–1942). Her father was a textile dealer and amateur trumpeter, who gave her trumpet lessons.

Two of her four siblings were the trumpeter Louis de Vries (1905–1935) and trombonist Jack de Vries (1906–1976) [nl], who both played in jazz orchestras. After a visit to the Netherlands, American jazz trumpeter and singer Louis Armstrong remarked: "that Louis de Vries, he had a sister Clara with a ladies-band. Oh boy, she could play that horn."

== Career ==
De Vries was one of the first professional female Dutch trumpet players. In 1929, de Vries won a major national soloist competition in Zandvoort. When she was aged 16, de Vries was engaged by Russian orchestra leader Leo Selinsky to travel through Europe with his women's orchestra the Blue Jazz Ladies.

After touring with Selinsky, she joined the Schirmann Jazz Girls, led by Alexander Schirmann, which debuted in Rotterdam on 1 May 1933 and later performed in Spain, Switzerland and Germany. The Jazz World magazine reviewed Schirmann's orchestra in February 1934, writing that de Vries: "gives us a hot solo, from which we are all amazed. Completely pure and virtuoso in improvisation, this girl gives an example of her skills in a way that commands admiration from all of us." While touring with the Schirmann Jazz Girls, de Vries became friends with saxaphonist Annie van't Zelfde.

By 1935, de Vries was bandleader for her own orchestra, Clara de Vries and the Jazz Ladies. Members of the orchestra included her friend Annie van't Zelfde, Elly Marel and Tilly Busch. Clara de Vries and the Jazz Ladies debuted in The Hague on 1 August 1935.

De Vries married fellow trumpeter Willy Schobben [nl], from Limburg, on 20 May 1936. They had no children.

Clara de Vries and Juultje Cambré performing on Omroepvereniging VARA radio station in 1938

In July 1937, de Vries played in the "Negropalace Mephisto." She also played for the Rosian Orchestra led by Eddy Walis. From 1938 until her death in 1942, de Vries was the bandleader of an all women jazz band called The Rosian Ladies, performing alongside Annie van 't Zelfde and Juultje Cambré, and with The Swinging Rascals. A clip of de Vries and Cambré performing on Omroepvereniging VARA radio station in 1938 survives.

After the outbreak of World War II, it became difficult for de Vries to play, as a Jewish musician, but she performed with the Plus Fours in Groningen. On 9 February 1941, de Vries played at the café-cabaret Alcazar on the Thorbeckeplein, outside the Jewish Quarter in Amsterdam, despite new rules in Nazi occupied Holland that barred Jewish people from performing. Members of the Dutch Nazi movement and political party Nationaal-Socialistische Beweging in Nederland (NSB) heard that Jewish jazz musicians were performing and raided the venue to beat up the customers, assisted by German soldiers, with 23 people wounded. A riot followed in the area two nights later and Dutch collaborator Hendrik Koot died. In response, the Jewish area was sealed off by the German authorities, which effectively began the Amsterdam ghetto, and a Judenrat was put into place.

== Death ==
De Vries did not want to go into hiding and played in the Amstel Cabaret in Amsterdam's Jewish quarter in August 1942. De Vries was transported with her parents to Westerbork transit camp on 16 October 1942, then was transported from Westerbork to Auschwitz Birkenau concentration camp on 19 October 1942. She was murdered in Auschwitz on 22 October 1942, aged 26.

== Legacy ==
In 1989, de Vries was one of the musicians in the Dutch TV documentary Sweet and hot music – Nederlandse damesorkesten uit de jaren ‘30, made by Dutch filmmaker Netty van Hoorn.

In 2013, de Vries was one of the women featured in the compilation of 1001 biographies about Dutch women, 1001 Vrouwen uit de Nederlandse geschiedenis.

A street in Rotterdam is named after de Vries.
