= De Hûnekop =

Dutch band

- Origin: Friesland
- Genres: Rock, pop, Country, Punk
- Years active: 2009–present
- Members: Emiel Stoffers; Bart Scheffers; Rik Alsma; Jeroen Seinstra
- Website: De Hûnekop

De Hûnekop is a four-piece band from the Dutch province Friesland. The band performs in the West Frisian language and is very popular regionally. The band is active since the year 2009, when the band was formed in Ljouwert. It has won the Fryslân Pop Talent Award in the year 2010.

== Discography ==
- 2010: It raast oan de protters
- 2011: Wanklanken fan 'e wurkflier
- 2012: Psalms foar de rûchhouwer
- 2014: Fiif jier smoar
- 2016: Klompetreen
- 2019: Monsterachtich
