= Mathijs Heyligers =

Mathijs Adriaan Heyligers (born 1957 in Naarden, the Netherlands) is a violin maker living in Cremona, Italy since 1975. He studied at the International School of Violin Making of Cremona and at the Violin Making School of Parma under the guidance of Renato Scrollavezza.

Having trained from a very young age also as a violinist (he studied with the granddaughter of Finnish composer Jean Sibelius) and continuing to play in public today, Mr. Heyligers has a profound understanding of musicians’ needs in terms of sound quality and playability. His instruments, made in the classic Cremona tradition, can be found worldwide and are especially appreciated in the U.S.A. and Japan.

Mathijs Heyligers has won awards in violin making at the international competitions of Salt Lake City, U.S.A. and Kassel, Germany and is founding member of the A. Stradivari Consortium of Violin and Bow Makers of Cremona, where he served as vice-president. Mr. Heyligers has also taught violin making at the International Violin Making School of Cremona.
