= Pia Beck =

Dutch jazz pianist and singer

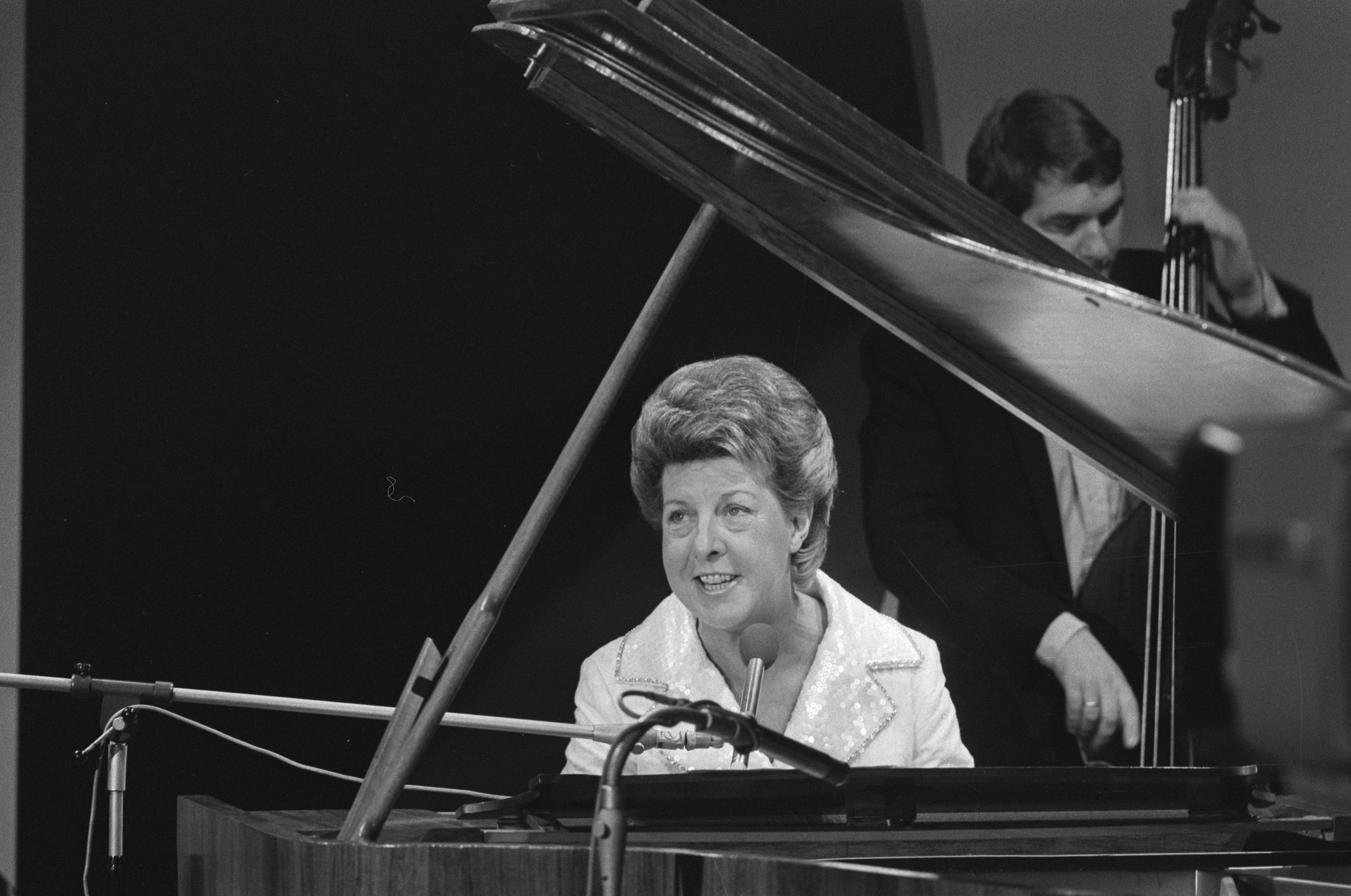
- Pia Beck in 1975

Background information
- Born: Pieternella Beck; 18 September 1925; The Hague, Netherlands
- Died: 26 November 2009 (aged 84) Málaga, Spain
- Genres: Jazz, boogie-woogie
- Occupations: Jazz pianist, singer
- Years active: c. 1940–2003
- Partner: Marga Samsonowski
- Website: piabeck.com

Pia Beck (born Pieternella Beck; 18 September 1925 – 26 November 2009) was a Dutch jazz pianist and singer. She was one of the most popular entertainers in the Netherlands during the 1950s and achieved international success in Europe and the United States.

== Early life ==
Pieternella Beck was born into a middle-class family in The Hague. She was the daughter of Floor Beck, a merchant and procuration holder, and Johanna Westerbaan. From an early age she displayed musical talent and later claimed that she could play several instruments as a child. Beck eventually focused on the piano. Attempts at formal musical training were unsuccessful; according to Beck, her teacher, the later conductor Bernard Haitink, dismissed her because of her 'unique gypsy talent' and advised her to pursue her music elsewhere.

== Musical career ==
During the German occupation of the Netherlands (1940–1945), Beck performed with the female vocal group the Samoa Girls. After the Second World War, she joined the Miller Sextet as a pianist and singer. With this ensemble she toured Europe, performed for American soldiers in Germany, and spent six months entertaining Dutch troops in the former Dutch East Indies (Indonesia).

In 1949 Beck left the Miller Sextet and formed her own trio. Throughout the 1950s she performed across the Netherlands, particularly at the venue De Vliegende Hollander in Scheveningen. Her repertoire consisted mainly of boogie-woogie and jazz standards, alongside German and French songs. Her first major hit was Pia's Boogie. From 1952 she also performed regularly in the United States where she appeared in major jazz clubs and gained international attention. In 1956 Beck was featured in Time magazine, which referred to her as "The Flying Dutchess". Despite appearances in Las Vegas in the early 1960s, she never permanently established herself in the American music scene, which she attributed partly to homesickness for the Netherlands.

== Later life and comeback ==
From the mid-1960s Beck's popularity declined as boogie-woogie fell out of fashion. Around 1965 she moved to Torremolinos in southern Spain, where she lived with her partner Marga Samsonowski and helped raise Samsonowski's children. Beck largely withdrew from public performance and ran various businesses, including a pianobar and a radio programme. Following that she worked in real estate and wrote travel books about the Costa del Sol.

In the mid-1970s she made a successful comeback in the Netherlands, attracting an older, nostalgic audience. In 1977 Beck drew public attention by participating in protests against American anti-gay activist Anita Bryant. She continued performing until 2003, when she retired at the age of 78. Beck remained in Churriana near Torremolinos, where she died on 26 November 2009, aged 84, several months after the death of Samsonowski. According to a friend the cause of death was heart failure.

== Reputation ==
Beck was widely regarded as a flamboyant and charismatic performer, noted for her distinctive piano style, stage presence, and ability to connect with audiences. The Canadian jazz pianist Oscar Peterson once described her as "the best jazz pianist in the world". Although she achieved international recognition, her later success was largely nostalgic. Beck was open about her long-term relationship with a woman but did not consider herself a spokesperson for the gay rights movement, consistently emphasizing that her artistic career rather than her sexuality defined her public identity.

== Discography (selection) ==
=== Albums ===
Year	Title	Format	Notes
1977	Play Beck	LP	Boogie-woogie.
1979	Call Me Beck	LP	Jazz and popular songs recorded during Beck's peak popularity.
1982	Pia's Party – P.S. I Love You	LP	Studio recordings aimed at a broad popular audience.

=== Compilation albums ===
Year	Title	Format	Notes
1976	Beck to the Fifties	LP	Compilation of Beck's 1950s repertoire.
1980	The Pia Beck Story	LP	Retrospective compilation of recordings from the 1940s and 1950s.
2009	Dutch Jazz Legend 1925–2009	2×CD	Posthumous overview of Beck's recordings.
2010	50 Years	2×CD, 1 DVD	Career-spanning retrospective marking her long career.
2021	Dutch Treats: Hot Boogie, Cool Bop and More 1946–1960	CD	International anthology of early jazz and boogie-woogie recordings.

=== EP's ===
Year	Title	Notes
1955	Flip Flop and Fly	Jazz and popular repertoire in multiple languages.
1956	Get Up Them Stairs	Early trio recordings.
1956	Lullaby of Birdland	Covers of American jazz standards.
1957	Get Happy	Vocal and piano performances.
1958	C’est Mon Gigolo	Includes French-language repertoire.

== Bibliography ==
- De Pia Beck story, 1982, Tiebosch – Amsterdam, ISBN 90-6278-782-7
- The touch of my life: Elise over Pia, 2000, Best Publishing Group – Best, ISBN 90-802019-4-4
